= Marksa =

Village in Estonia

- village
- Location in Estonia
- Coordinates: 58°17′51″N 24°16′19″E
- Country: Estonia
- County: Pärnu County
- Municipality: Pärnu

Population (01.01.2011)
  - Total: 93

Marksa is a village in Pärnu municipality, Pärnu County, in southwestern Estonia, on the coast of Pärnu Bay (part of the Gulf of Riga). It has a population of 93 (as of 1 January 2011). Prior to the 2017 administrative reform of local governments, it was located in Audru Parish.

Lindi Nature Reserve with Lindi bog is located just northwest of Marksa, in Kõpu.

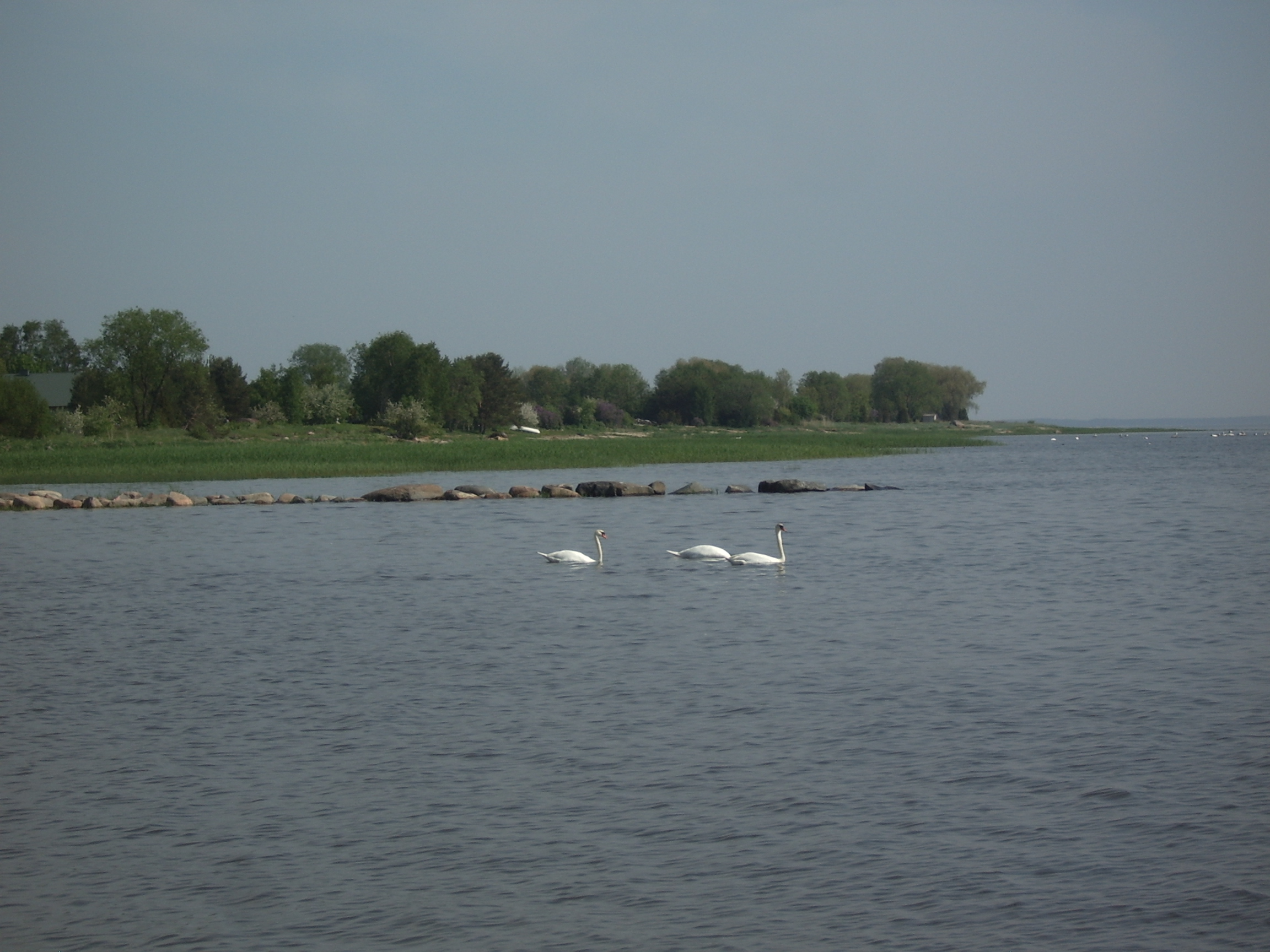
View at the sea in Marksa.
