= Põldeotsa =

Village in Estonia

- village
- Location in Estonia
- Coordinates: 58°24′07″N 24°18′00″E
- Country: Estonia
- County: Pärnu County
- Municipality: Pärnu

Population (01.01.2011)
  - Total: 178

Põldeotsa is a village in Pärnu municipality, Pärnu County, in southwestern Estonia. It is located just southwest of Audru, on the coast of Pärnu Bay (part of the Gulf of Riga). The city of Pärnu is located 12 km east. Põldeotsa has a population of 178 (as of 1 January 2011). Prior to the 2017 administrative reform of local governments, it was located in Audru Parish.
