= Audru Parish =

Former municipality of Estonia (2013-2017)

Audru Parish Audru vald
- Former municipality
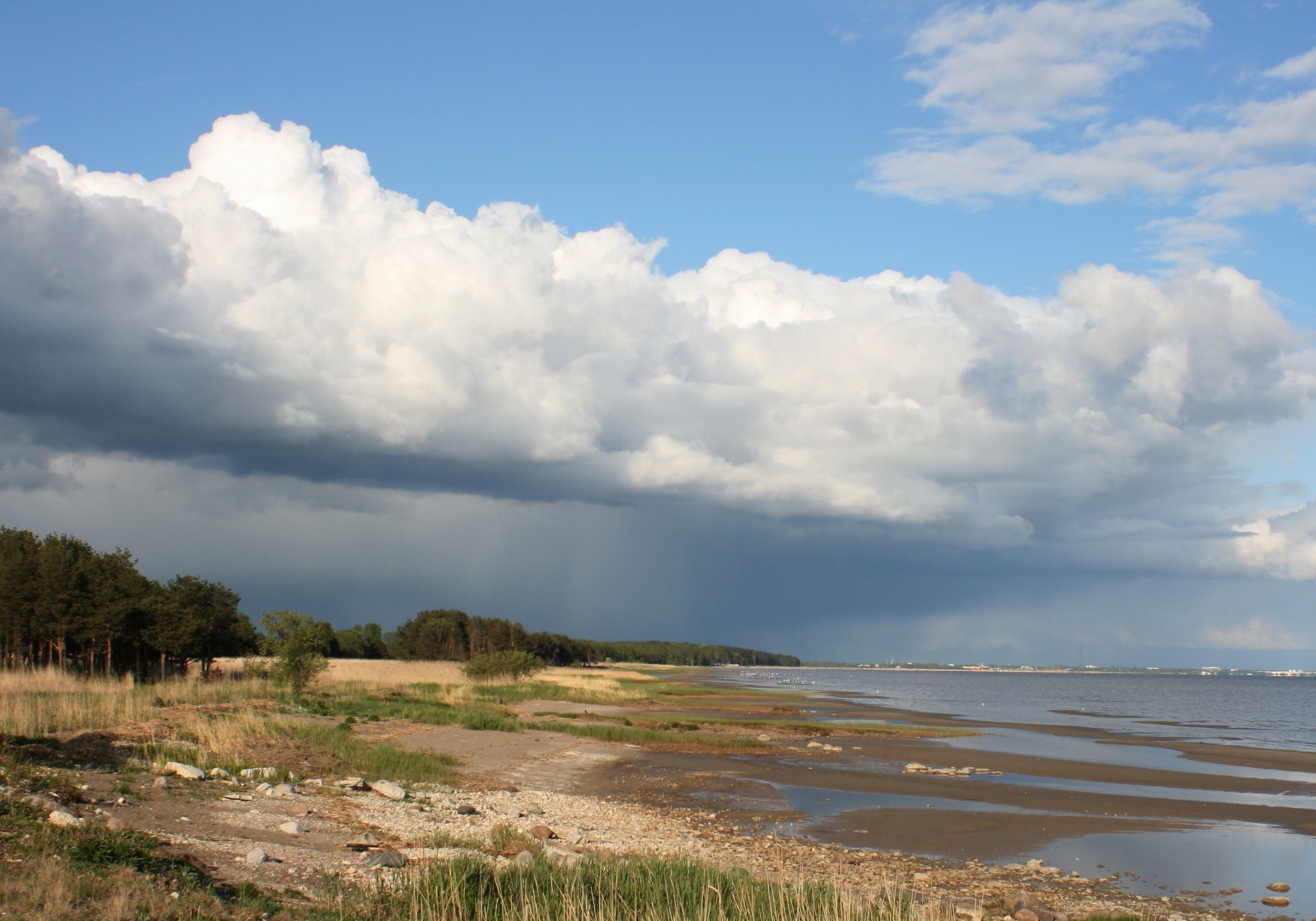
- View of Valgarand

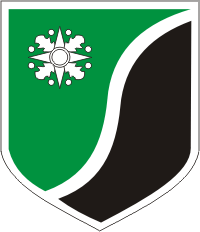
- Flag Coat of arms

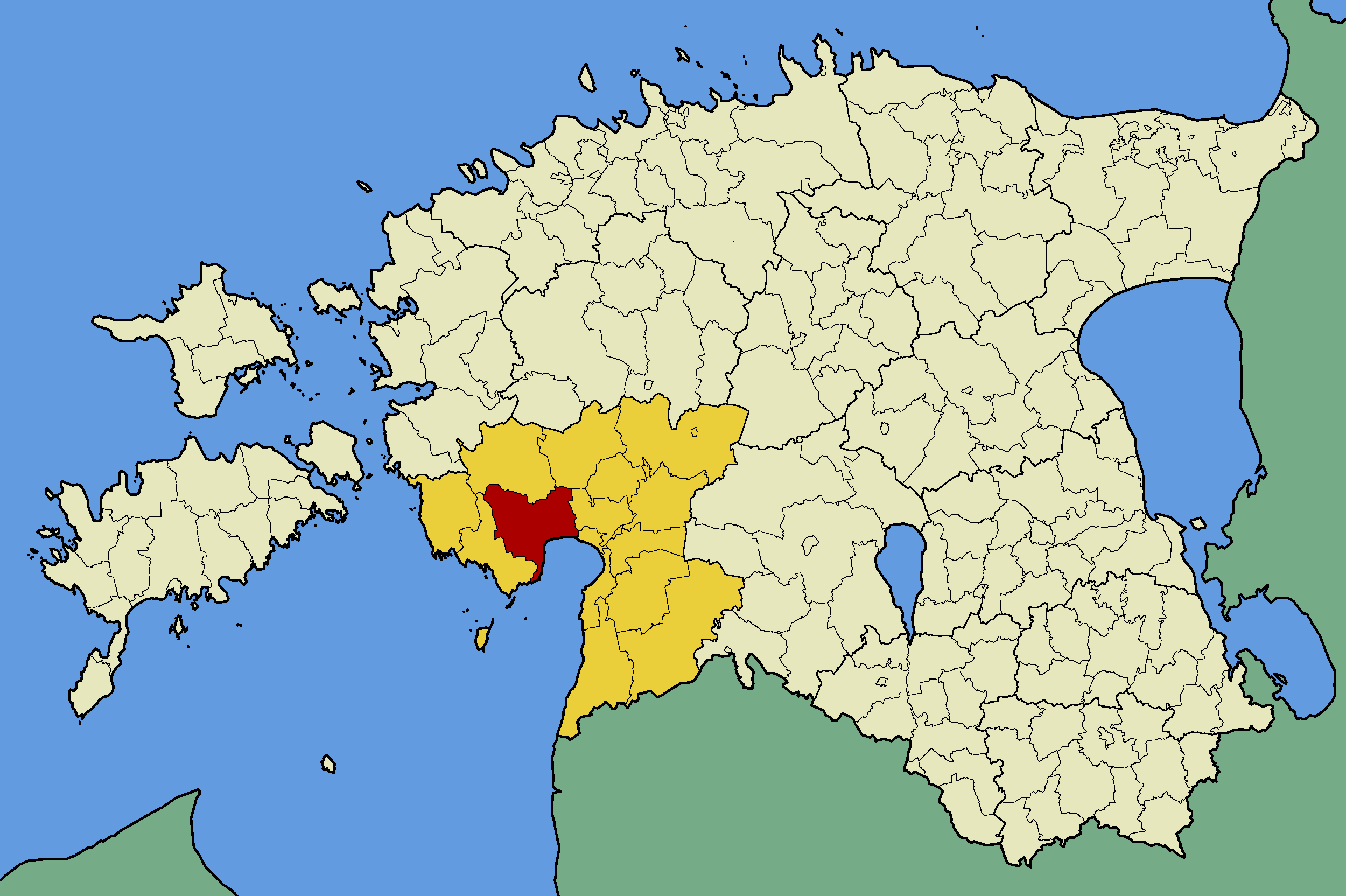
- Audru Parish within Pärnu County.
- Country: Estonia
- County: Pärnu County
- Administrative centre: Audru

Area
  - Total: 379 km^{2} (146 sq mi)

Population (01.01.2009)
  - Total: 5,497
  - Density: 14.5/km^{2} (37.6/sq mi)
- Website: www.audru.ee

Audru was a municipality located in Pärnu County, one of the 15 counties of Estonia.

== Settlements ==
Borough

Lavassaare

Small borough

Audru

Villages

Ahaste, Aruvälja, Eassalu, Jõõpre, Kabriste, Kärbu, Kihlepa, Kõima, Lemmetsa, Liiva, Lindi, Liu, Malda, Marksa, Oara, Papsaare, Põhara, Põldeotsa, Ridalepa, Saari, Saulepa, Soeva, Soomra, Tuuraste, Valgeranna.

== See also ==
- Audru Ring
- Lake Lavassaare
