= Pohara =

Pohara may refer to

- Põhara, a village in Estonia
- Pohara, a settlement in New Zealand
- Pōhara Marae, a meeting ground in Arapuni, New Zealand
