= Lemmetsa =

Village in Estonia

- village
- Location in Estonia
- Coordinates: 58°25′57″N 24°23′01″E
- Country: Estonia
- County: Pärnu County
- Municipality: Pärnu

Population (01.01.2011)
  - Total: 251

Lemmetsa is a village in Pärnu municipality, Pärnu County, in southwestern Estonia. It is located just northeast of Audru, the administrative centre of the municipality, the city of Pärnu is located 8 km southeast. Lemmetsa has a population of 251 (as of 1 January 2011). Prior to the 2017 administrative reform of local governments, it was located in Audru Parish.
