= Malda, Estonia =

Village in Estonia

Malda
- village
- Location in Estonia
- Coordinates: 58°26′30″N 24°18′24″E
- Country: Estonia
- County: Pärnu County
- Municipality: Pärnu

Population (01.01.2011)
  - Total: 117

Malda is a village in Pärnu municipality, Pärnu County, in southwestern Estonia. It is located just northwest of Audru small borough, the city of Pärnu is located 12 km southeast. Malda has a population of 117 (as of 1 January 2011). Prior to the 2017 administrative reform of local governments, it was located in Audru Parish.
