= Eassalu =

Village in Estonia

- village
- Location in Estonia
- Coordinates: 58°23′31″N 24°10′35″E
- Country: Estonia
- County: Pärnu County
- Municipality: Pärnu

Population (01.01.2011)
  - Total: 32

Eassalu is a village in Pärnu municipality, Pärnu County, in southwestern Estonia. It has a population of 32 (as of 1 January 2011). Prior to the 2017 administrative reform of local governments, it was located in Audru Parish.

Eassalu is bordered by the Nätsi-Võlla Nature Reserve on its northern, western and northwestern sides.
