= Valgeranna =

Village in Estonia

- village
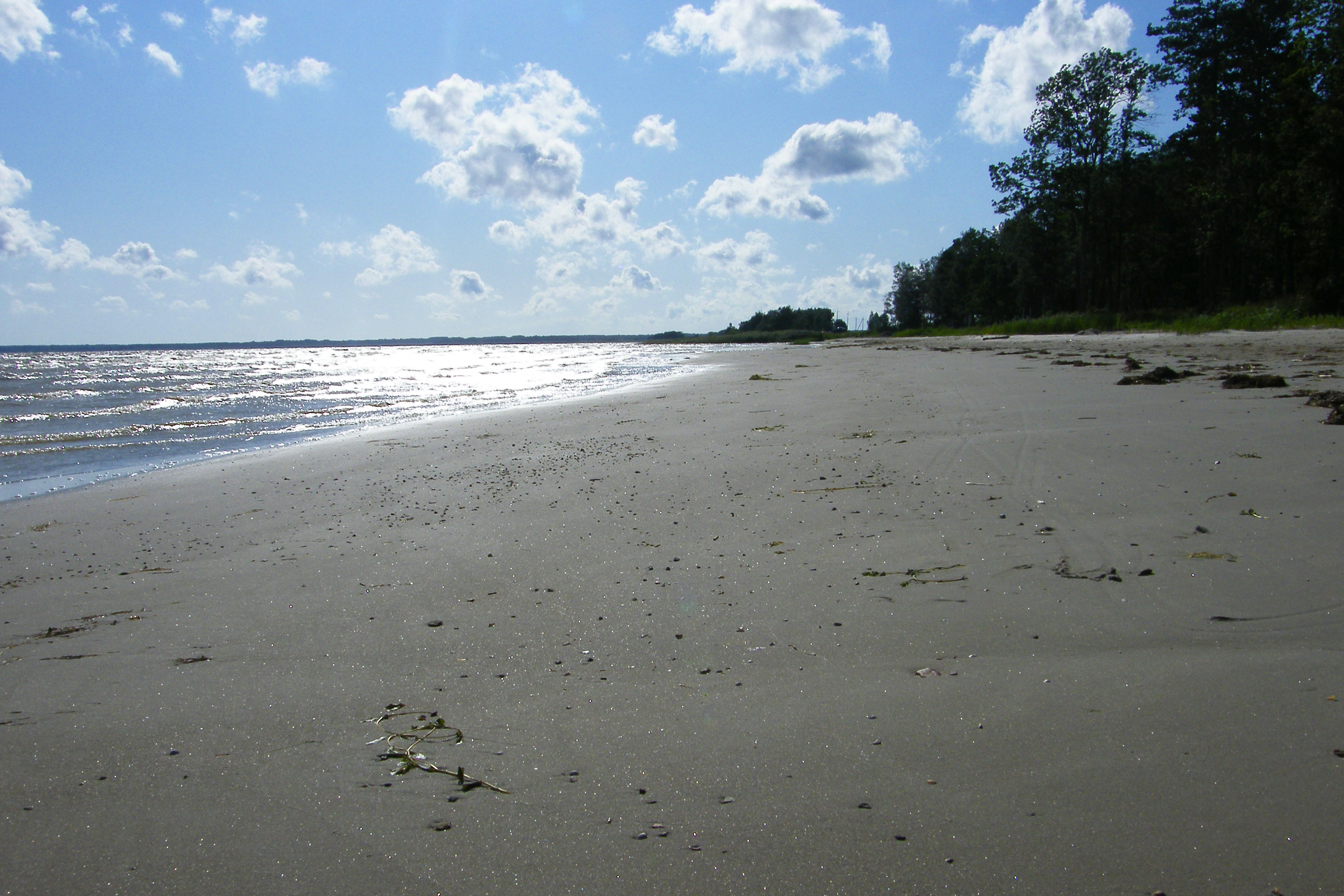
- Beach in Valgeranna.

- Location in Estonia
- Coordinates: 58°23′16″N 24°23′35″E
- Country: Estonia
- County: Pärnu County
- Municipality: Pärnu

Population (01.01.2011)
  - Total: 19

Valgeranna is a village in Pärnu municipality, Pärnu County, in southwestern Estonia. It is located just south of Audru, on the coast of Pärnu Bay (part of the Gulf of Riga). The city of Pärnu is located 7 km east. Valgeranna has a population of 19 (as of 1 January 2011). Prior to the 2017 administrative reform of local governments, it was located in Audru Parish.
