= Kärbu =

Village in Estonia

- village
- Location in Estonia
- Coordinates: 58°25′45″N 24°14′08″E
- Country: Estonia
- County: Pärnu County
- Municipality: Pärnu

Population (01.01.2011)
  - Total: 65

Kärbu is a village in Pärnu municipality, Pärnu County, in southwestern Estonia. It has a population of 65 (as of 1 January 2011). Prior to the 2017 administrative reform of local governments, it was located in Audru Parish.

Kärbu is bordered by the Nätsi-Võlla Nature Reserve on its western side.
