= Soeva =

Village in Estonia

- village
- Location in Estonia
- Coordinates: 58°29′03″N 24°08′14″E
- Country: Estonia
- County: Pärnu County
- Municipality: Pärnu

Population (01.01.2011)
  - Total: 77

Soeva is a village in Pärnu municipality, Pärnu County, in southwestern Estonia. It has a population of 77 (as of 1 January 2011). Prior to the 2017 administrative reform of local governments, it was located in Audru Parish.

Most of the village's territory is occupied by the Nätsi-Võlla Nature Reserve. The settlement itself is located by the Pärnu–Lihula road (nr. 60).
