= Pärnu (urban municipality) =

Municipality of Estonia (2017)

Pärnu Estonian: Pärnu linn
- Municipality of Estonia
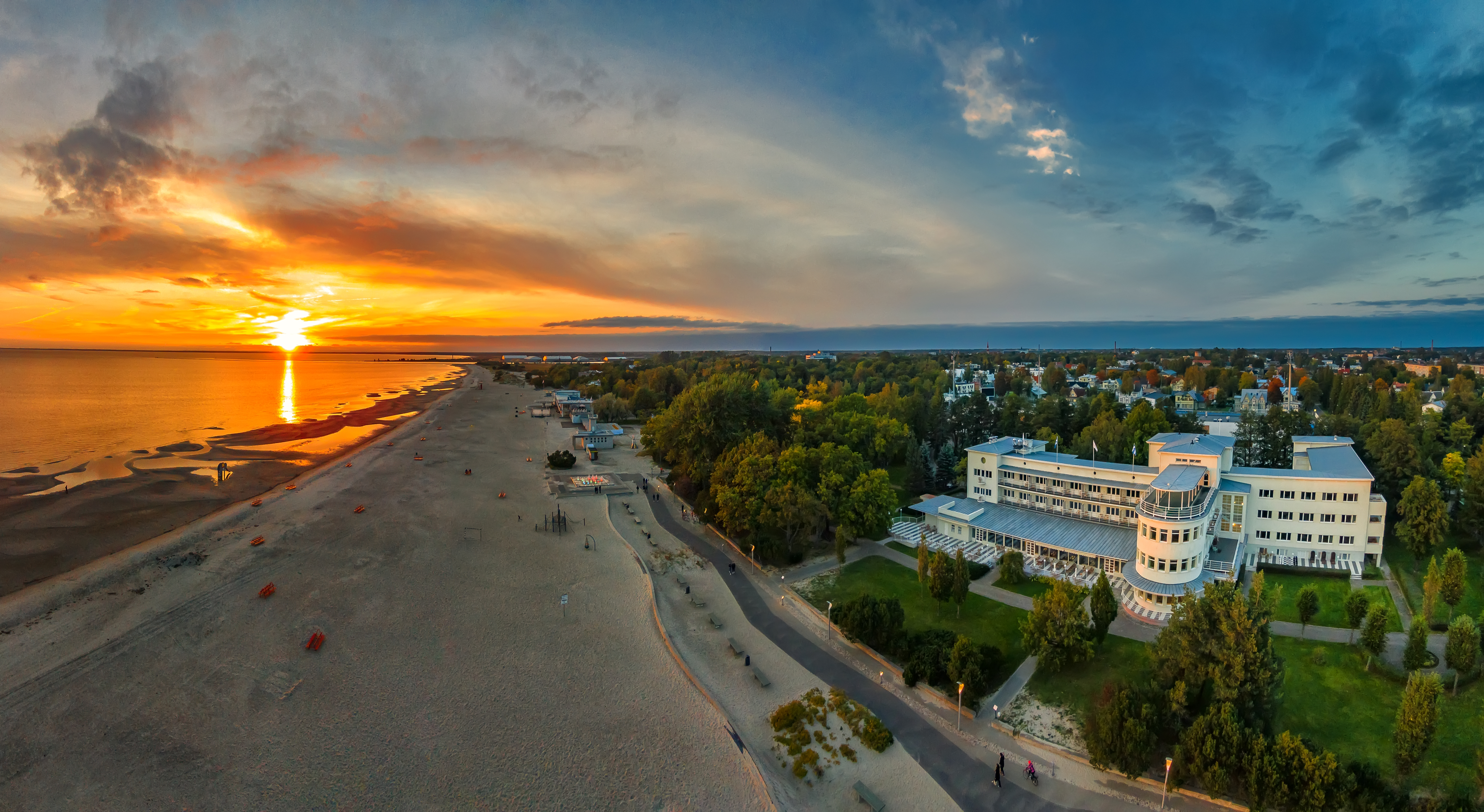

- Flag Coat of arms

- Location of Pärnu in Estonia
- Country: Estonia
- County: Pärnu County
- Administrative centre: Pärnu

Government
  - Mayor: Romek Kosenkranius

Area
  - Total: 858 km^{2} (331 sq mi)

Population (1.01.2021)
  - Total: 50,639
  - Density: 59.0/km^{2} (153/sq mi)
- ISO 3166 code: EE-624
- Website: Official website

Pärnu (Estonian: Pärnu linn) is an urban municipality of Estonia, in Pärnu County. It comprises the town of Pärnu and settlements of former parishes of Audru, Paikuse and Tõstamaa.

== Settlements ==
town

- Pärnu

boroughs

- Audru, Tõstamaa, Paikuse and Lavassaare

villages

Ahaste, Alu, Aruvälja, Eassalu, Ermistu, Jõõpre, Kabriste, Kastna, Kavaru, Kihlepa, Kiraste, Kõima, Kõpu, Kärbu, Lao, Lemmetsa, Liiva, Lindi, Liu, Lõuka, Malda, Manija, Marksa, Männikuste, Oara, Papsaare, Peerni, Pootsi, Põhara, Põldeotsa, Põlendmaa, Päraküla, Rammuka, Ranniku, Ridalepa, Saari, Saulepa, Seliste, Seljametsa, Silla, Soeva, Soomra, Tammuru, Tuuraste, Tõhela, Tõlli, Valgeranna, Vaskrääma, Värati.

== Administration ==
Local administration consists of the city council and the city government. City council elections take place every four years. The number of councillors depends on the population. The current number of councillors are 39.

== Twin towns – sister cities ==
Pärnu is twinned with:

- Gran, Norway
- Helsingborg, Sweden
- Jelgava, Latvia
- Ocean City, Maryland, United States
- Oskarshamn, Sweden
- Portsmouth, United States
- Šiauliai, Lithuania
- Siófok, Hungary
- Södertälje, Sweden
- Vaasa, Finland

== Citizens of honour ==
- 1886 Konstantin Possiet
- 1901 Friedrich Fromhold Martens
- 1934 Konstantin Päts
- 2007 Neeme Järvi
- 2008 Valter Ojakäär
- 2009 Jüri Jaanson
