= Jõõpre =

Village in Estonia

- village
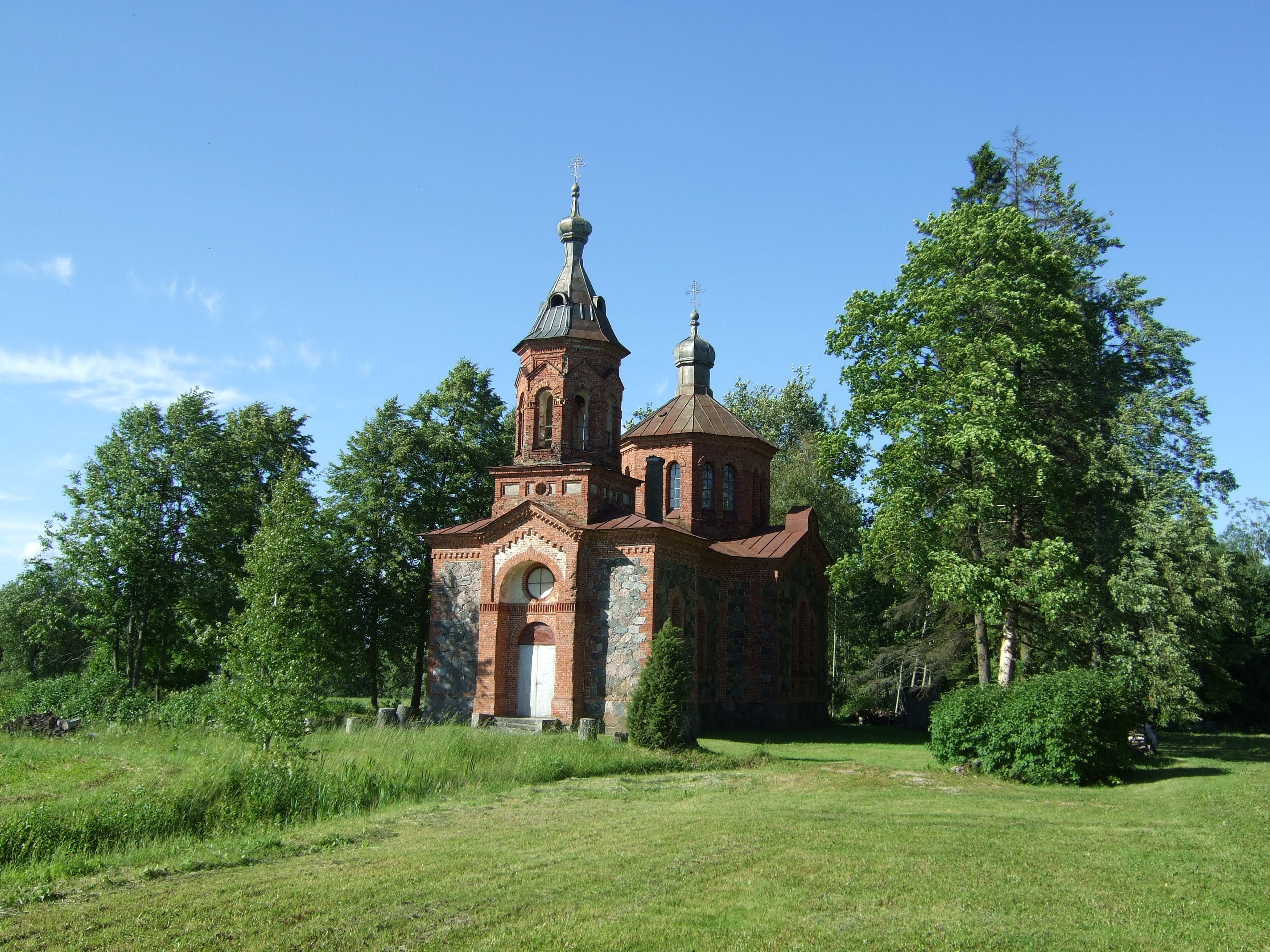
- Orthodox Church of Jõõpre

- Location in Estonia
- Coordinates: 58°28′29″N 24°19′12″E
- Country: Estonia
- County: Pärnu County
- Municipality: Pärnu
- First mentioned: 1571

Population (01.01.2011)
  - Total: 464

Jõõpre (German: Jäper) is a village in Pärnu municipality, Pärnu County, in southwestern Estonia. It is located just southwest of the borough of Lavassaare. Jõõpre has a population of 464 (as of 1 January 2011). Prior to the 2017 administrative reform of local governments, it was located in Audru Parish.

Jõõpre was first mentioned in 1571 as Jeckepere. Jõõpre (Jaepern) state manor was established in the 17th century. 1935 a new schoolhouse was built on the former site of the manor.

Jõõpre Orthodox church was built in 1878.
