= Papsaare =

Village in Estonia

- village
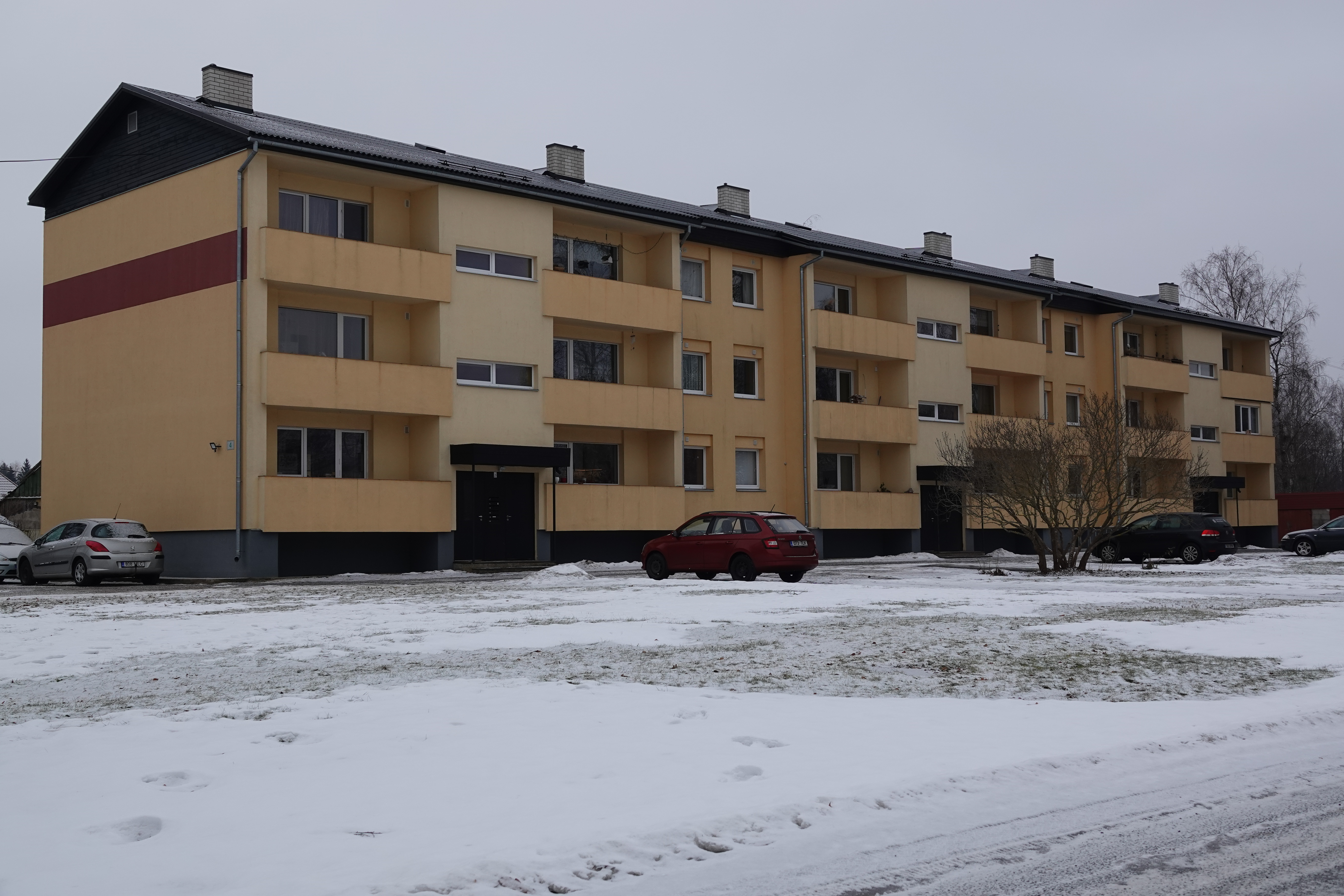
- Housing in Papsaare

- Location in Estonia
- Coordinates: 58°24′10″N 24°24′58″E
- Country: Estonia
- County: Pärnu County
- Municipality: Pärnu

Population (01.01.2011)
  - Total: 889

Papsaare is a village in Pärnu municipality, Pärnu County, in southwestern Estonia. It is located just northwest of the city of Pärnu and east of Audru. The centre of Pärnu is 5 km away. Papsaare has a population of 889 (as of 1 January 2011). Prior to the 2017 administrative reform of local governments, it was located in Audru Parish.

Motor racing circuit Audru Ring is located on the Pärnu side of the village, beside the Sauga River.
