= Saulepa =

Village in Estonia

- village
- Location in Estonia
- Coordinates: 58°21′47″N 24°17′13″E
- Country: Estonia
- County: Pärnu County
- Municipality: Pärnu

Population (01.01.2011)
  - Total: 63

Saulepa is a village in Pärnu municipality, Pärnu County, in southwestern Estonia, on the coast of Pärnu Bay (part of the Gulf of Riga). It has a population of 63 (as of 1 January 2011). Prior to the 2017 administrative reform of local governments, it was located in Audru Parish.
