= Aruvälja, Pärnu County =

Village in Estonia

Aruvälja
- village
- Location in Estonia
- Coordinates: 58°27′37″N 24°10′57″E
- Country: Estonia
- County: Pärnu County
- Municipality: Pärnu

Population (01.01.2011)
  - Total: 50

Aruvälja is a village in Pärnu municipality, Pärnu County, in southwestern Estonia. It has a population of 50 (as of 1 January 2011). Prior to the 2017 administrative reform of local governments, it was located in Audru Parish.

Most of the village territory are occupied by bogs, which are part of the Nätsi-Võlla Nature Reserve. The settlement is located in the northeastern part of the territory, by the Pärnu–Lihula road (nr. 60).
