= Lindi, Estonia =

Village in Estonia

Lindi
- village
- Location in Estonia
- Coordinates: 58°19′42″N 24°15′20″E
- Country: Estonia
- County: Pärnu County
- Municipality: Pärnu

Population (01.01.2011)
  - Total: 307

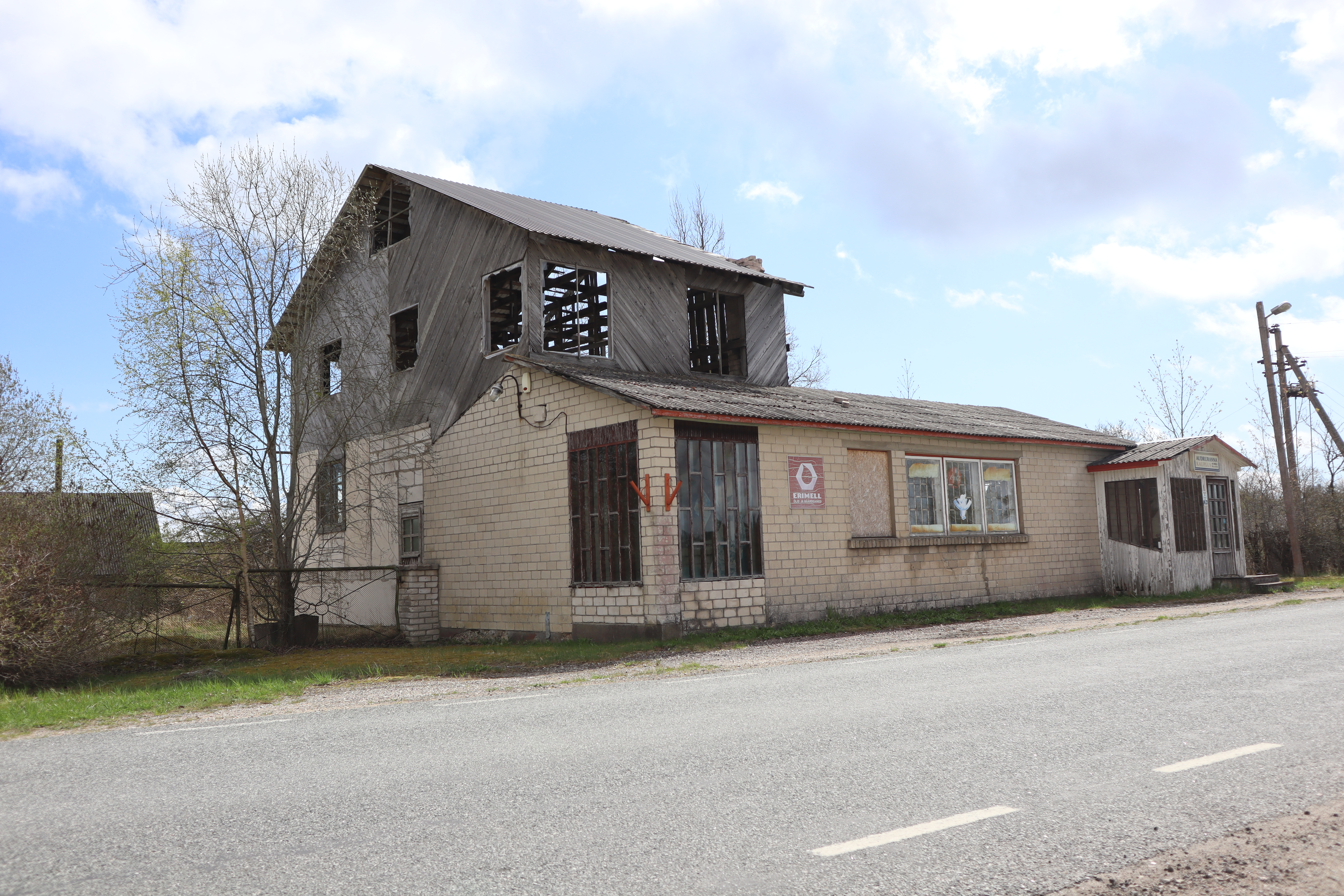
Ruins of Auduranna's shop, Lindi village, April 2023

Lindi (German: Woldenhof) is a village in Pärnu municipality, Pärnu County, in southwestern Estonia, on the coast of Pärnu Bay (part of the Gulf of Riga). It has a population of 307 (as of 1 January 2011). Prior to the 2017 administrative reform of local governments, it was located in Audru Parish.

Lindi Nature Reserve with Lindi bog is located just southwest of Lindi, on the territory of Kõpu village.
