= Soomra, Estonia =

Village in Estonia

Soomra
- village
- Location in Estonia
- Coordinates: 58°22′37″N 24°07′58″E
- Country: Estonia
- County: Pärnu County
- Municipality: Pärnu

Population (01.01.2011)
  - Total: 470

Soomra is a village in Pärnu municipality, Pärnu County, in southwestern Estonia. It has a population of 470 (as of 1 January 2011). Prior to the 2017 administrative reform of local governments, it was located in Audru Parish.

Soomra is bordered by the Nätsi-Võlla Nature Reserve on its northeastern side.
