= Päraküla =

Päraküla may refer to several places in Estonia:

- Päraküla, Pärnu County, village in Tõstamaa Parish, Pärnu County
- Päraküla, Viljandi County, village in Suure-Jaani Parish, Viljandi County
