= Lindi (disambiguation) =

Lindi can mean:

- Lindi Region in Tanzania
- Lindi, the capital of Lindi Region
- The Lindi River in the Democratic Republic of the Congo
- Lindi, Estonia
- Lingti, a town in Tibet, also spelled Lindi
- Lindi St Clair, prostitute and author
- Albert Lindegger, artist and satirist, also known as Lindi
