= Kastna, Pärnu County =

Village in Estonia

Kastna
- village
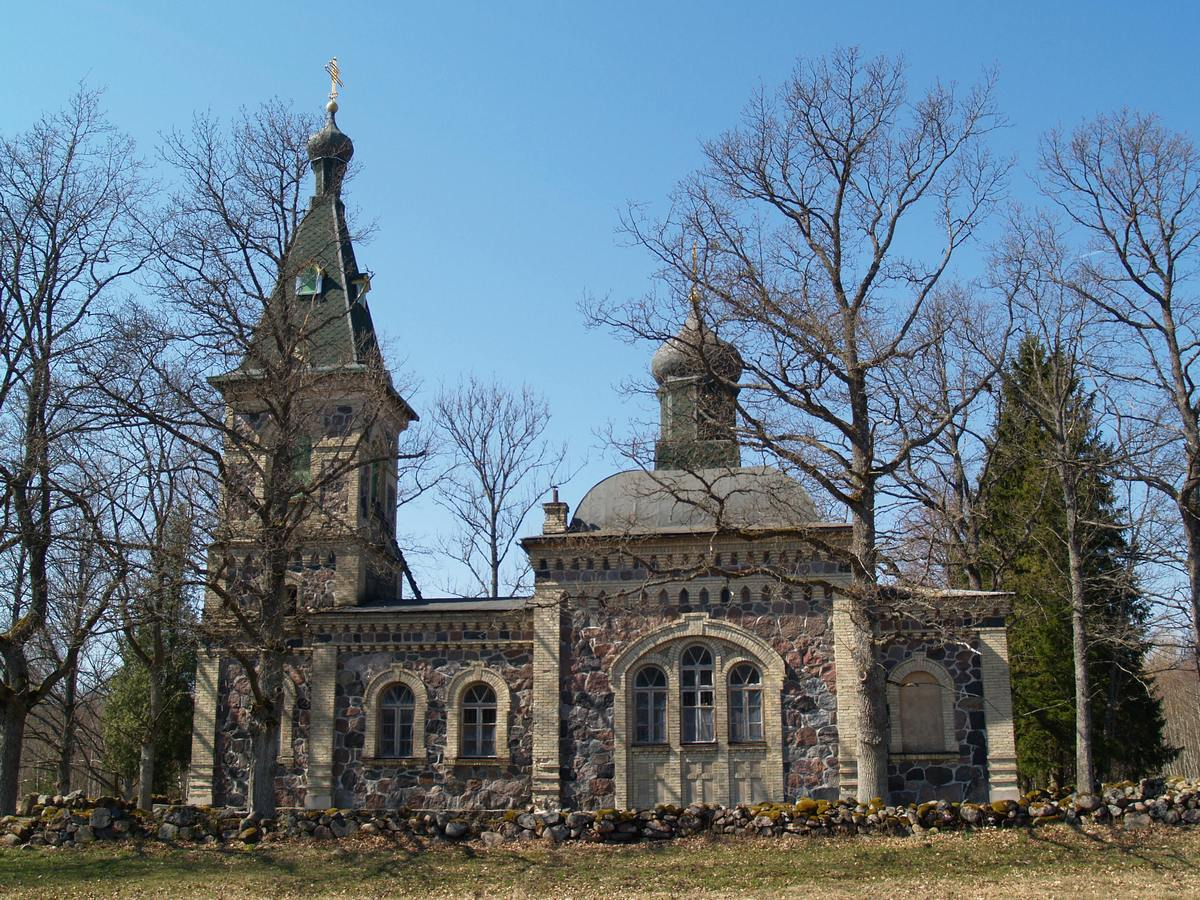
- St. Arsenius church in Kastna.

- Location in Estonia
- Coordinates: 58°20′05″N 23°53′35″E
- Country: Estonia
- County: Pärnu County
- Municipality: Pärnu urban municipality
- First mentioned: 1228

Population (01.01.2011)
  - Total: 51
- Website: www.kastnaselts.ee

Kastna is a village in Pärnu urban municipality, Pärnu County, in southwestern Estonia, on the coast of Gulf of Riga. It has a population of 51 (as of 1 January 2011).

Kastna Manor was first mentioned in 1228.

Kastna St. Arsenius Orthodox church was built in 1904.

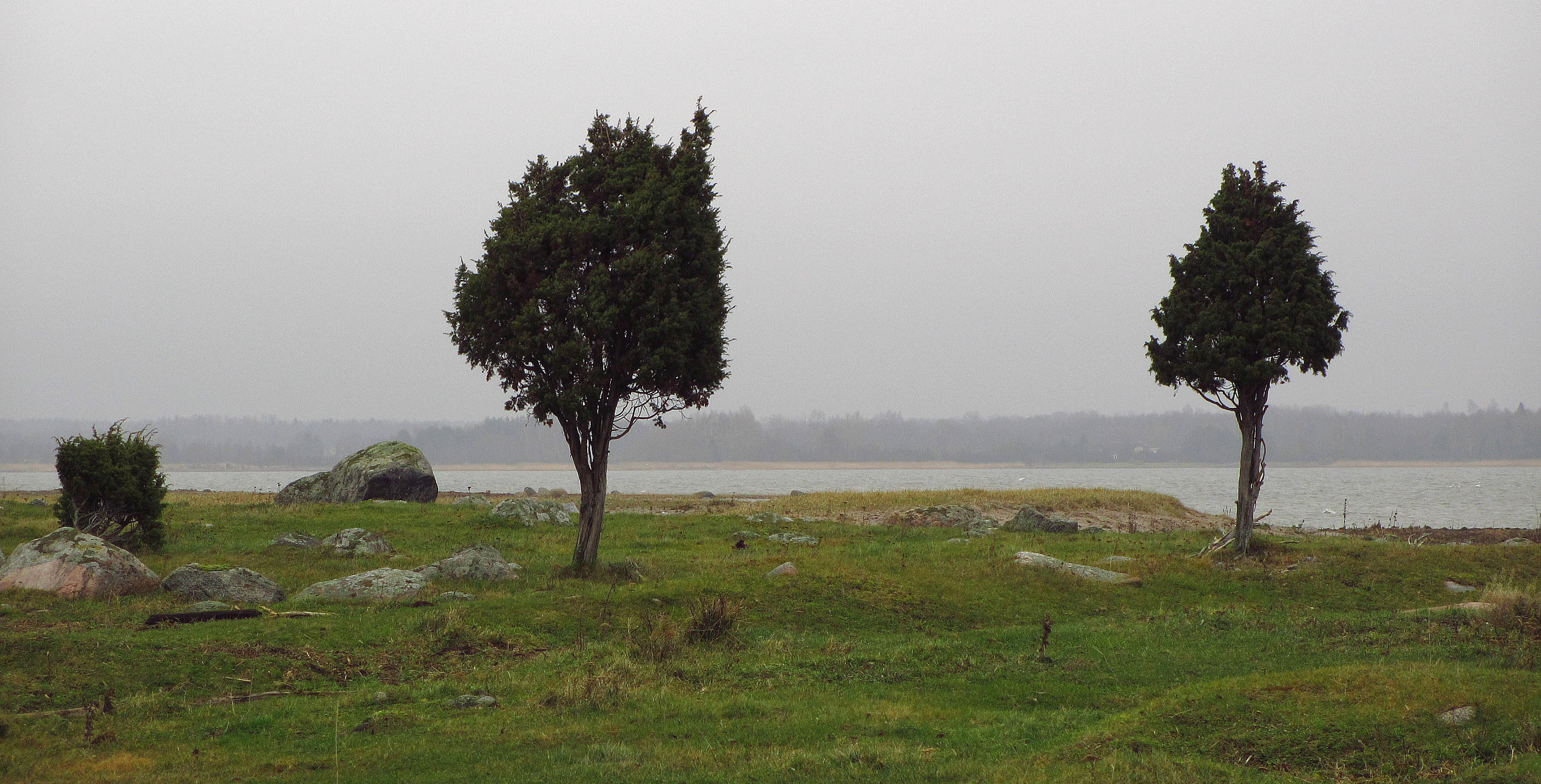
Coastal meadow in Kastna.
