= Oldbac Kalana =

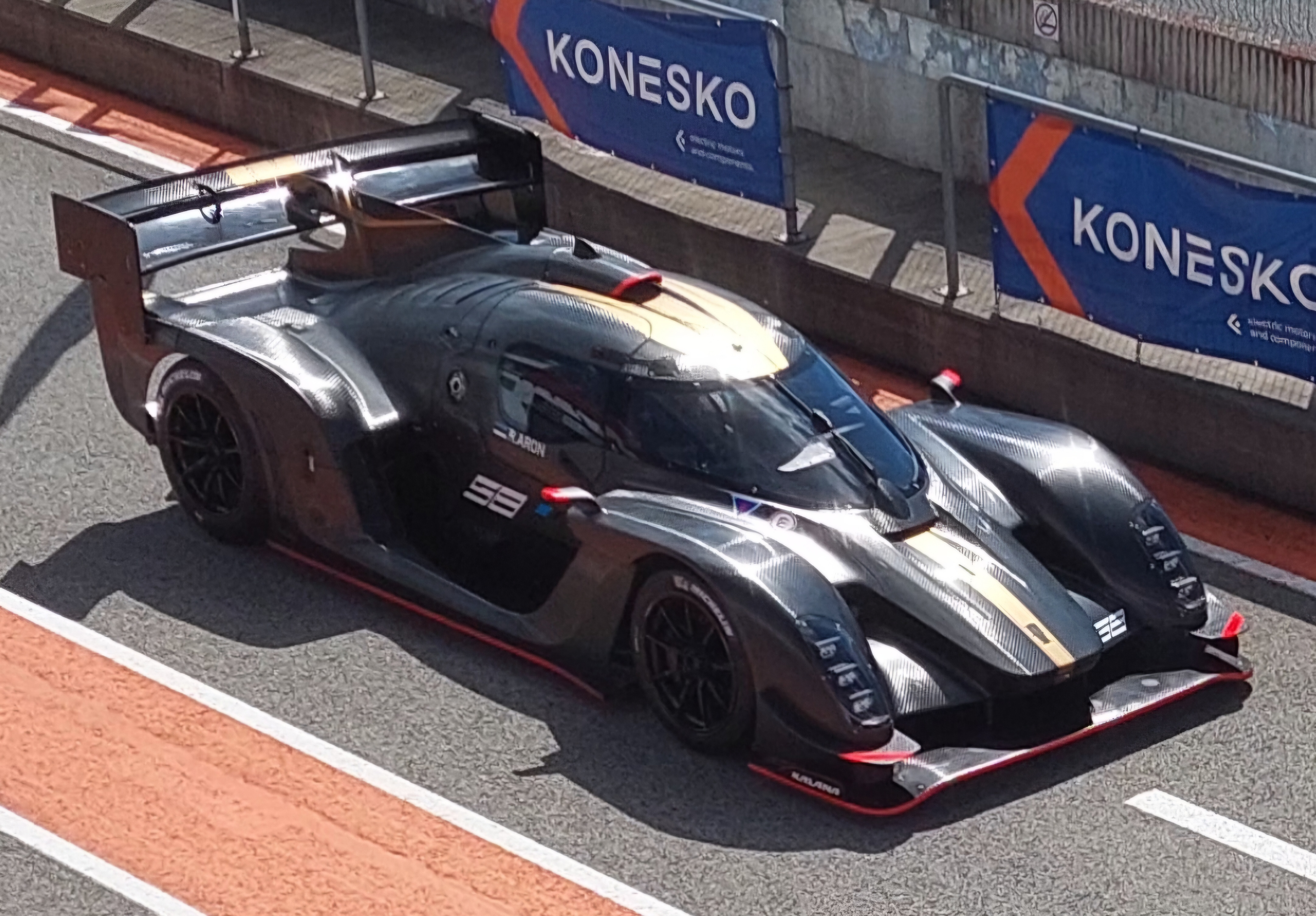
- Oldbac Kalana driven by Ralf Aron in 2026

Overview
- Manufacturer: Oldbac
- Production: 2023–present
- Assembly: Estonia

Body and chassis
- Class: Track day car
- Body style: 2-door coupé
- Layout: Rear mid-engine, rear-wheel drive

Powertrain
- Engine: 3.4 L Judd DB naturally aspirated V8
- Power output: 610 hp (450 kW; 620 PS)
- Transmission: 6-speed Sadev SLR 90-20 semi-automatic transmission

Dimensions
- Wheelbase: 2,700 mm (106.3 in)
- Length: 4,513 mm (177.7 in)
- Width: 2,009 mm (79.1 in)
- Height: 1,171 mm (46.1 in)
- Curb weight: 920 kg (2,028.3 lb)

The Oldbac Kalana is a track-only sports car developed by Estonian car manufacturer Oldbac, and built in partnership with Italian coachbuilder Manifattura Automobili Torino. The car was created with the intention of setting a lap time of under 1:00 at the Porsche Ring, where it currently holds the outright record.

== Overview ==
The Kalana's bodywork is built entirely out of carbon fiber and is adjustable for different aerodynamic settings. The car makes use of a carbon fiber monocoque equipped with a FIA-approved roll cage and FIA homologated fuel cell typically used in GT race cars. The front and rear suspension setups are double wishbone with push-rods and adjustable dampers by Öhlins. The car is powered by a 3.4-liter naturally aspirated V8 developed by Judd with an output of 610 hp (450 kW; 620 PS), mated to a 6-speed semi-automatic transmission manufactured by Sadev. The Kalana uses Michelin tires.

For purposes of real-world preparation, Oldbac worked with American simulation company International Endurance Racing Simulations to develop an officially licensed mod of the Kalana to use in the Assetto Corsa video game as a driver training tool.

== Lap records ==
Track	Lap time	Driver
Biķernieki Complex Sports Base	1:12.725	Tõnis Vanaselja
Porsche Ring	1:05.775	Ralf Aron
