= Kihlepa =

Village in Estonia

- village
- Location in Estonia
- Coordinates: 58°23′43″N 24°14′39″E
- Country: Estonia
- County: Pärnu County
- Municipality: Pärnu

Population (01.01.2011)
  - Total: 159

Kihlepa is a village in Pärnu municipality, Pärnu County, in southwestern Estonia. It has a population of 159 (as of 1 January 2011). Prior to the 2017 administrative reform of local governments, it was located in Audru Parish.

Kihlepa is the location of a pig farm that accommodates 2,800 pigs. It is owned by OÜ Lõpe Agro and produces pigs for Rakvere Lihakombinaat.

== Gallery ==
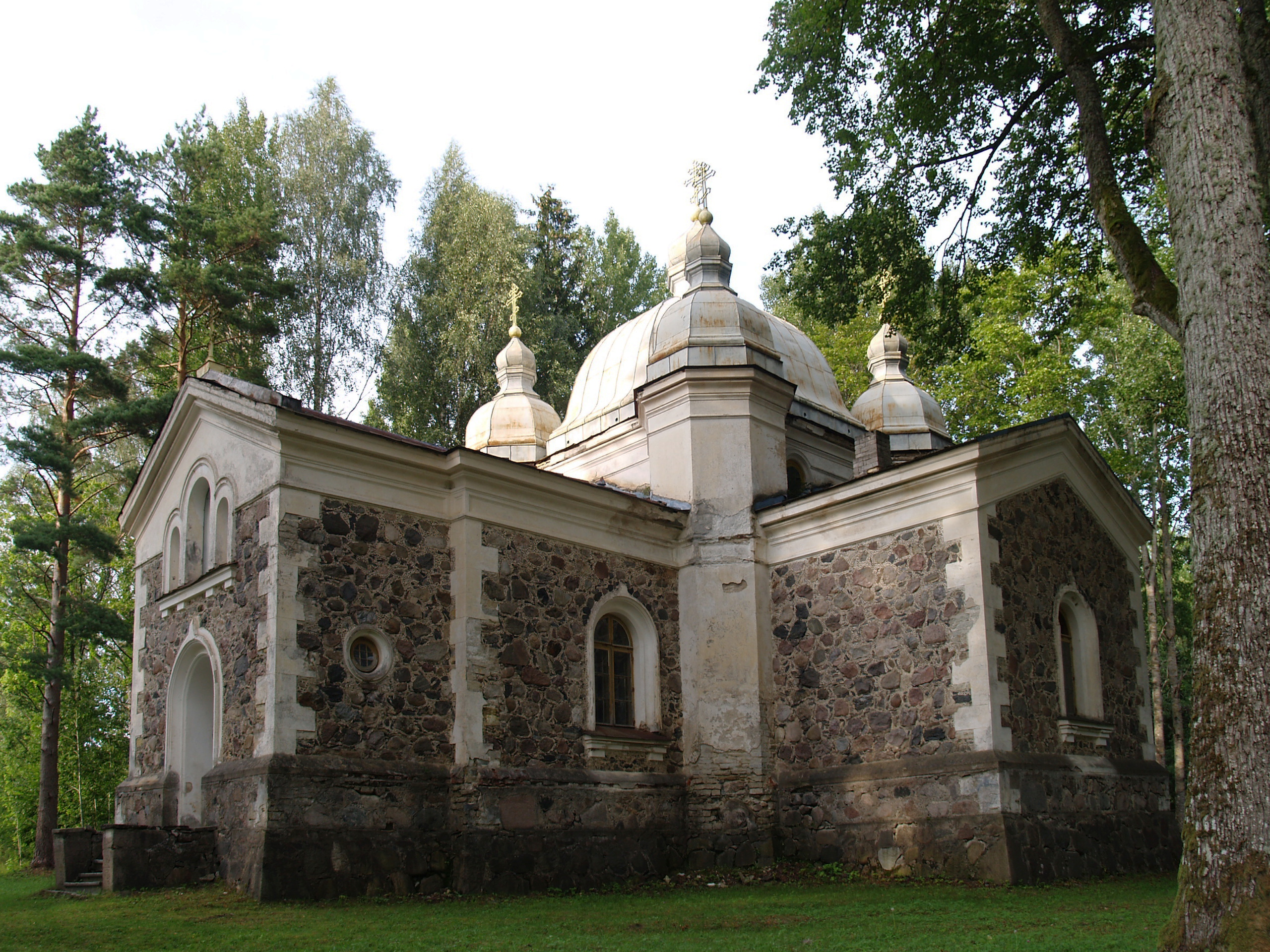

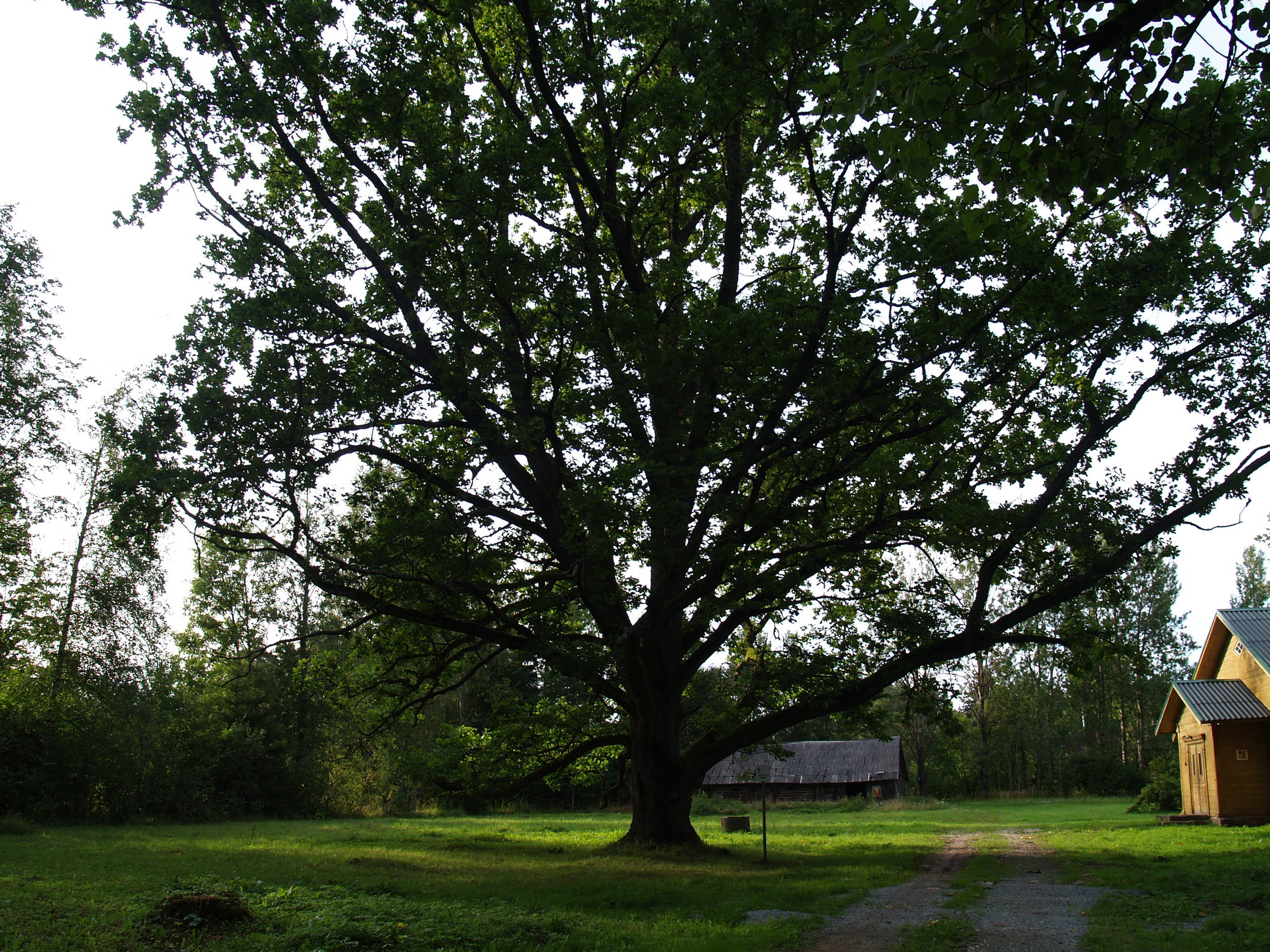
