= Tammuru =

Village in Estonia

Coordinates: 58°21′N 24°43′E

- Village
- Interactive map of Tammuru
- Country: Estonia
- County: Pärnu County
- Parish: Pärnu municipality
- Time zone: UTC+2 (EET)
  - Summer (DST): UTC+3 (EEST)

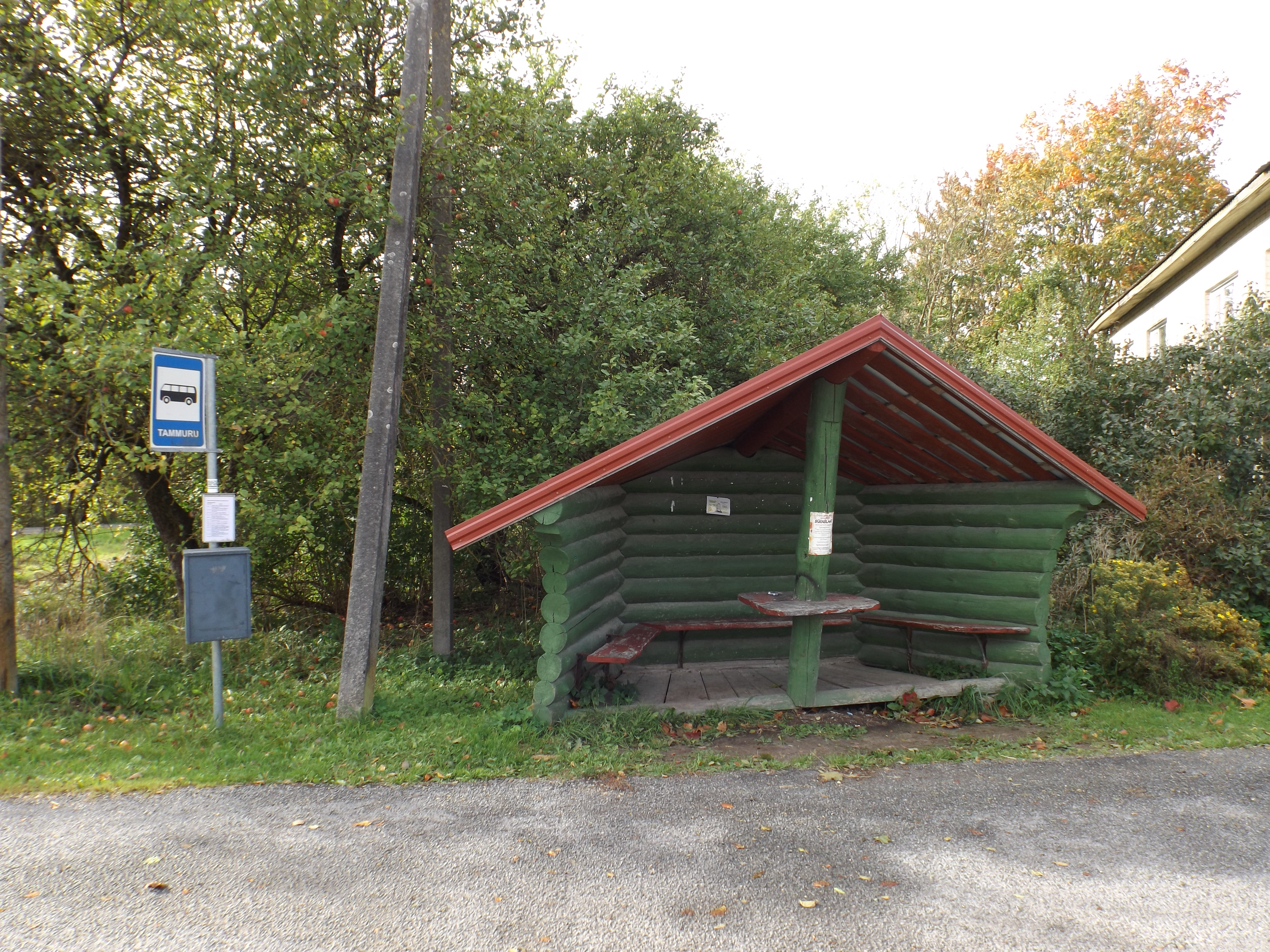
Bus stop in Tammuru

Tammuru is a village in Pärnu municipality, Pärnu County in southwestern Estonia.

The village has about 130–150 people. It is in a quiet rural area, surrounded by fields and meadows, with groundwater that is relatively clean and protected from pollution.
