= Alu, Pärnu County =

Village in Estonia

Alu
- village
- Location in Estonia
- Coordinates: 58°25′26″N 24°02′29″E
- Country: Estonia
- County: Pärnu County
- Municipality: Pärnu urban municipality

Population (01.01.2011)
  - Total: 18
- Website: www.tohela.ee

Alu is a village in Pärnu urban municipality, Pärnu County, in southwestern Estonia. It has a population of 18 (as of 1 January 2011).
