= Kõima, Pärnu =

Village in Estonia

Kõima
- village
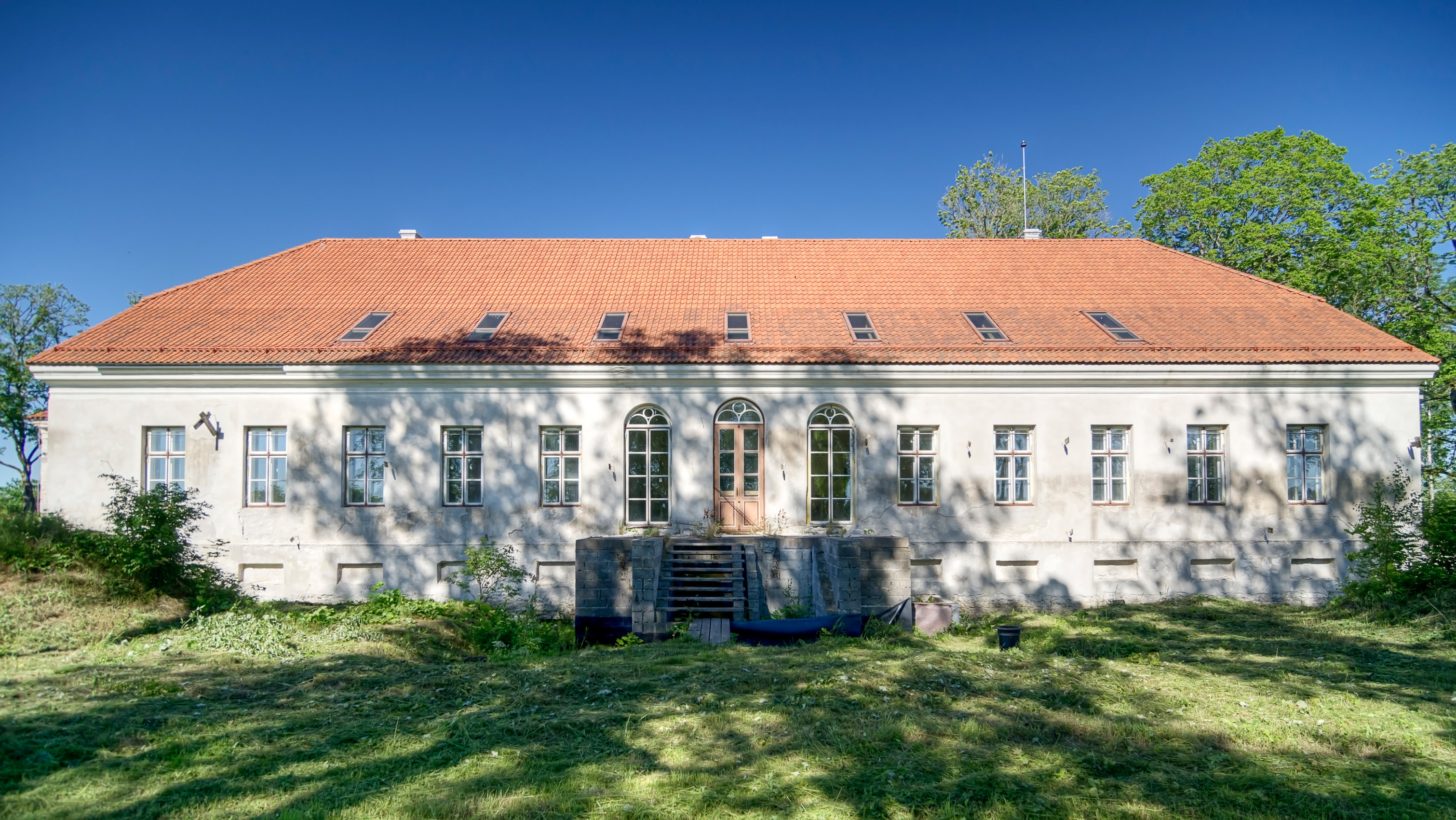
- Kõima manor

- Location in Estonia
- Coordinates: 58°21′43″N 24°15′11″E
- Country: Estonia
- County: Pärnu County
- Municipality: Pärnu

Population (01.01.2011)
  - Total: 213

Kõima is a village in Pärnu municipality, Pärnu County, in southwestern Estonia. It had a population of 213 on 1 January 2011. Before the 2017 administrative reform of local governments, it was located in Audru Parish.
