= Põlendmaa =

Village in Estonia

Coordinates: 58°23′N 24°50′E

- Village
- Interactive map of Põlendmaa
- Country: Estonia
- County: Pärnu County
- Parish: Pärnu urban municipality
- Time zone: UTC+2 (EET)
  - Summer (DST): UTC+3 (EEST)

Põlendmaa is a village in Pärnu urban municipality, Pärnu County in southwestern Estonia.
