= Silla, Pärnu County =

Village in Estonia

Coordinates: 58°20′31″N 24°37′46″E

Silla
- Village
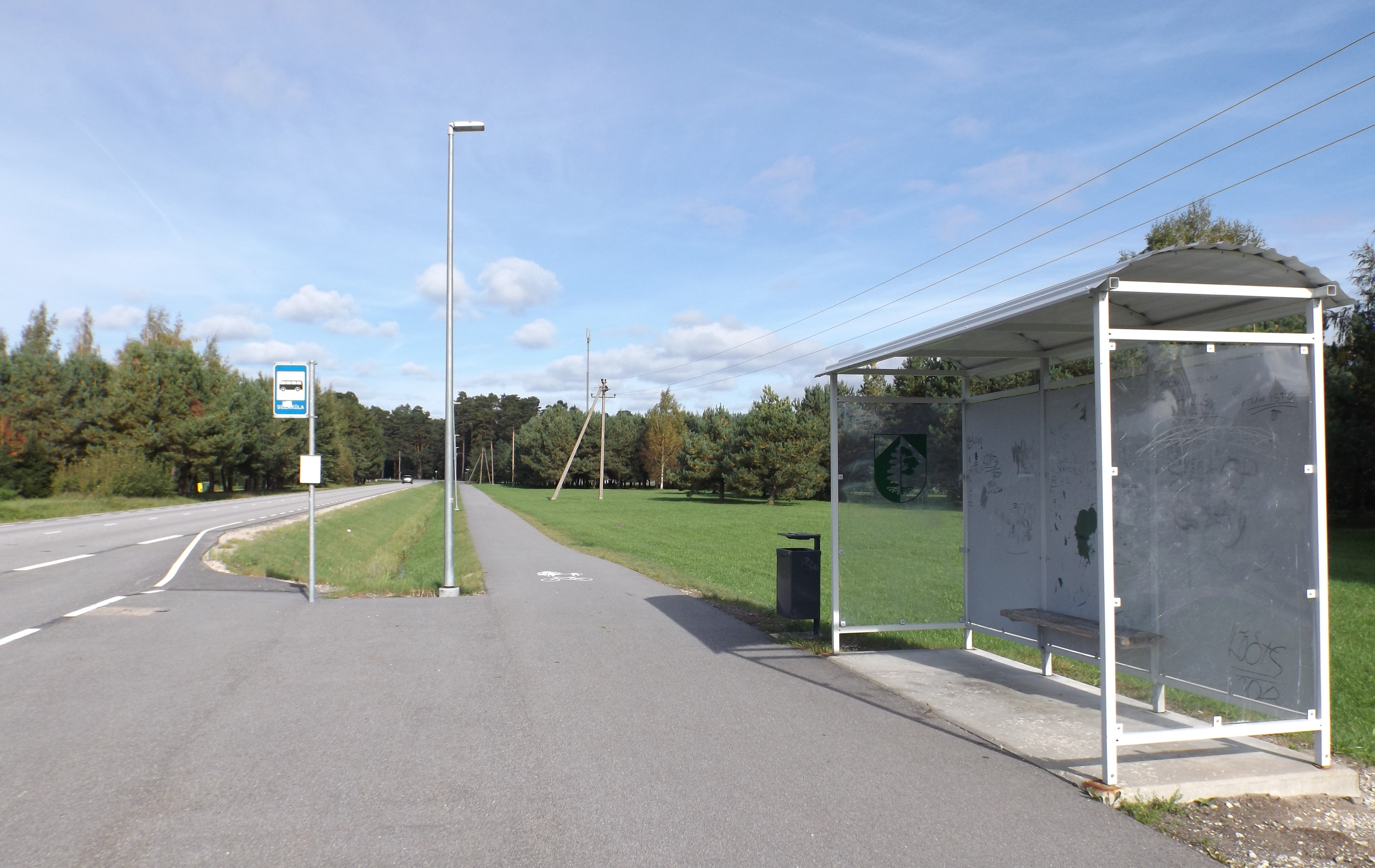
- Interactive map of Silla
- Country: Estonia
- County: Pärnu County
- Parish: Pärnu municipality
- Time zone: UTC+2 (EET)
  - Summer (DST): UTC+3 (EEST)

Silla is a village in Pärnu municipality, Pärnu County in southwestern Estonia.
