= Oara =

Village in Estonia

- village
- Location in Estonia
- Coordinates: 58°27′54″N 24°18′44″E
- Country: Estonia
- County: Pärnu County
- Municipality: Pärnu

Population (01.01.2011)
  - Total: 114

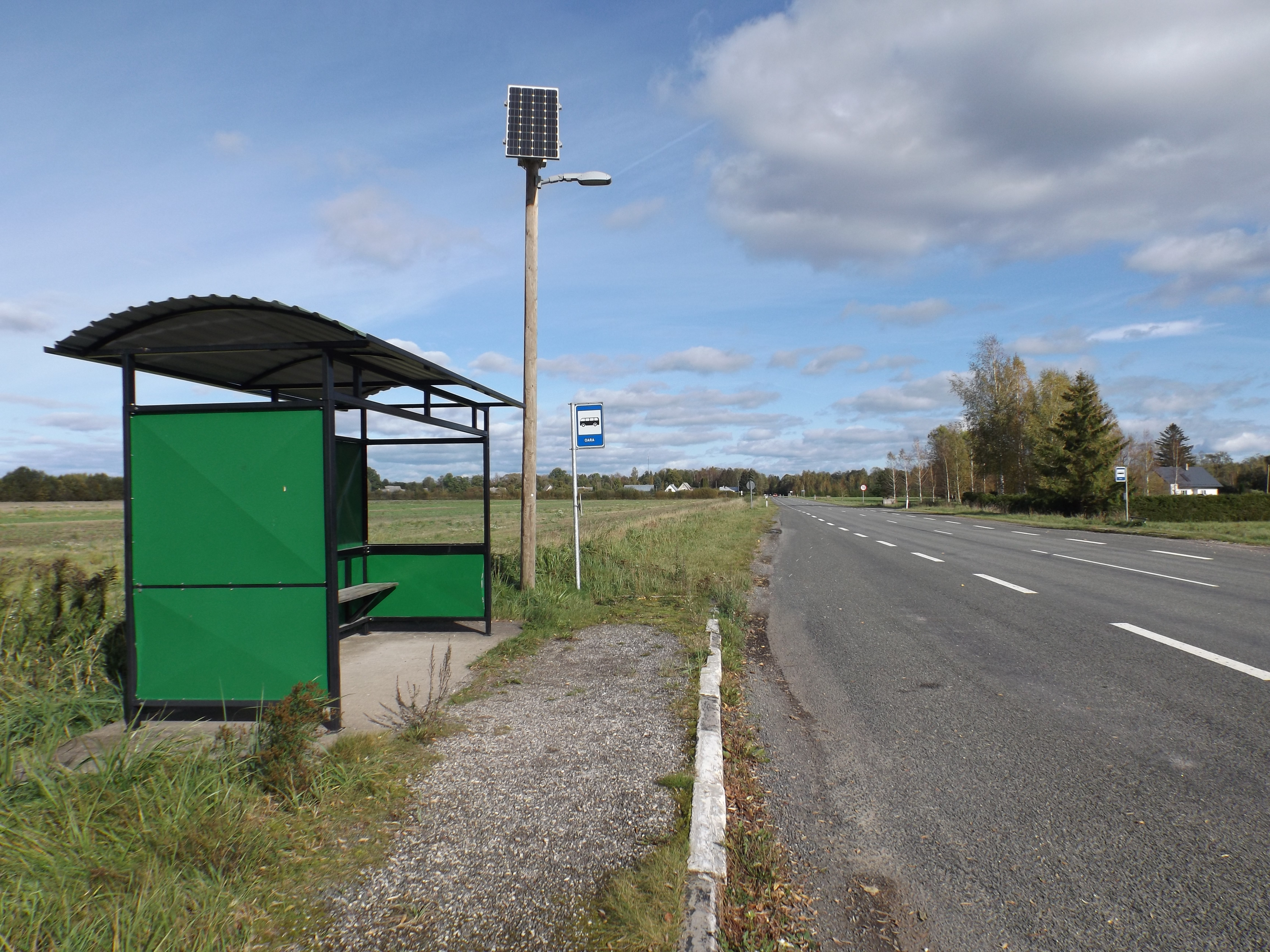
A bus stop in Oara village

Oara is a village in Pärnu municipality, Pärnu County, in southwestern Estonia. It has a population of 114 (as of 1 January 2011). Prior to the 2017 administrative reform of local governments, it was located in Audru Parish.
