= Liiva, Pärnu County =

Village in Estonia

Liiva
- village
- Location in Estonia
- Coordinates: 58°25′55″N 24°16′27″E
- Country: Estonia
- County: Pärnu County
- Municipality: Pärnu

Population (1 January 2011)
  - Total: 52

Liiva is a village in Pärnu municipality, Pärnu County, in southwestern Estonia. It has a population of 52 (as of 1 January 2011). Prior to the 2017 administrative reform of local governments, it was located in Audru Parish.
