= Saari, Estonia =

Village in Estonia

Saari
- village
- Location in Estonia
- Coordinates: 58°29′10″N 24°23′36″E
- Country: Estonia
- County: Pärnu County
- Municipality: Pärnu

Population (01.01.2011)
  - Total: 28

Saari is a village in Pärnu municipality, Pärnu County, in southwestern Estonia. It has a population of 28 (as of 1 January 2011). Prior to the 2017 administrative reform of local governments, it was located in Audru Parish.
