= Ahaste =

Village in Estonia

- village
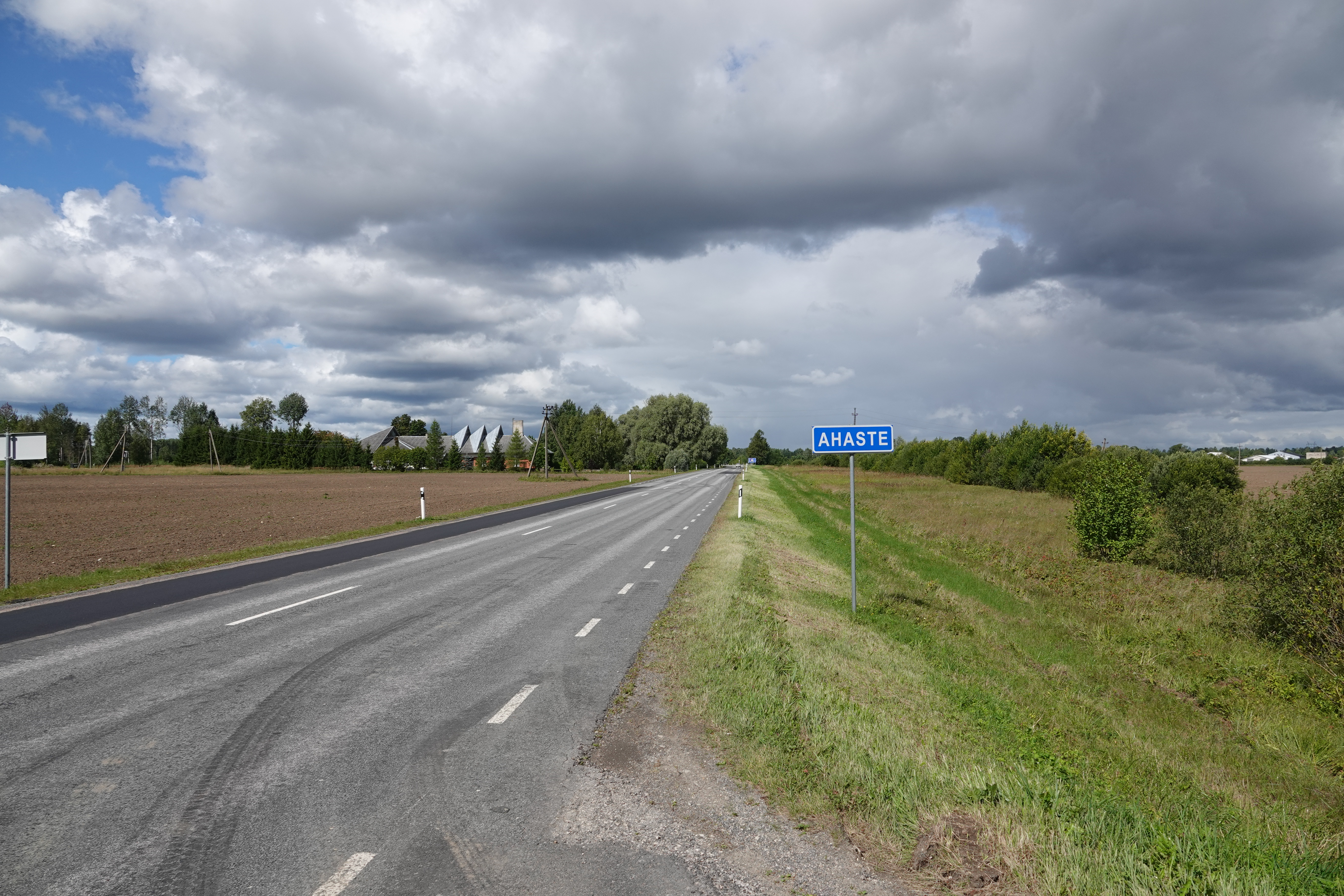
- Village sign for Ahaste on Estonia Route 60

- Location in Estonia
- Coordinates: 58°28′35″N 24°11′37″E
- Country: Estonia
- County: Pärnu County
- Municipality: Pärnu

Population (01.01.2011)
  - Total: 248

Ahaste (German: Friedenthal) is a village in Pärnu municipality, Pärnu County, in southwestern Estonia. It has a population of 248 (as of 1 January 2011).

Prior to the 2017 administrative reform of local governments, it was located in Audru Parish.
