= Kiraste =

Village in Estonia

- village
- Location in Estonia
- Coordinates: 58°27′47″N 23°59′04″E
- Country: Estonia
- County: Pärnu County
- Municipality: Pärnu urban municipality

Population (01.01.2011)
  - Total: 19
- Website: www.tohela.ee

Kiraste is a village in Pärnu urban municipality, Pärnu County, in southwestern Estonia. It has a population of 19 (as of 1 January 2011).
