= Kavaru, Estonia =

Village in Estonia

Kavaru
- village
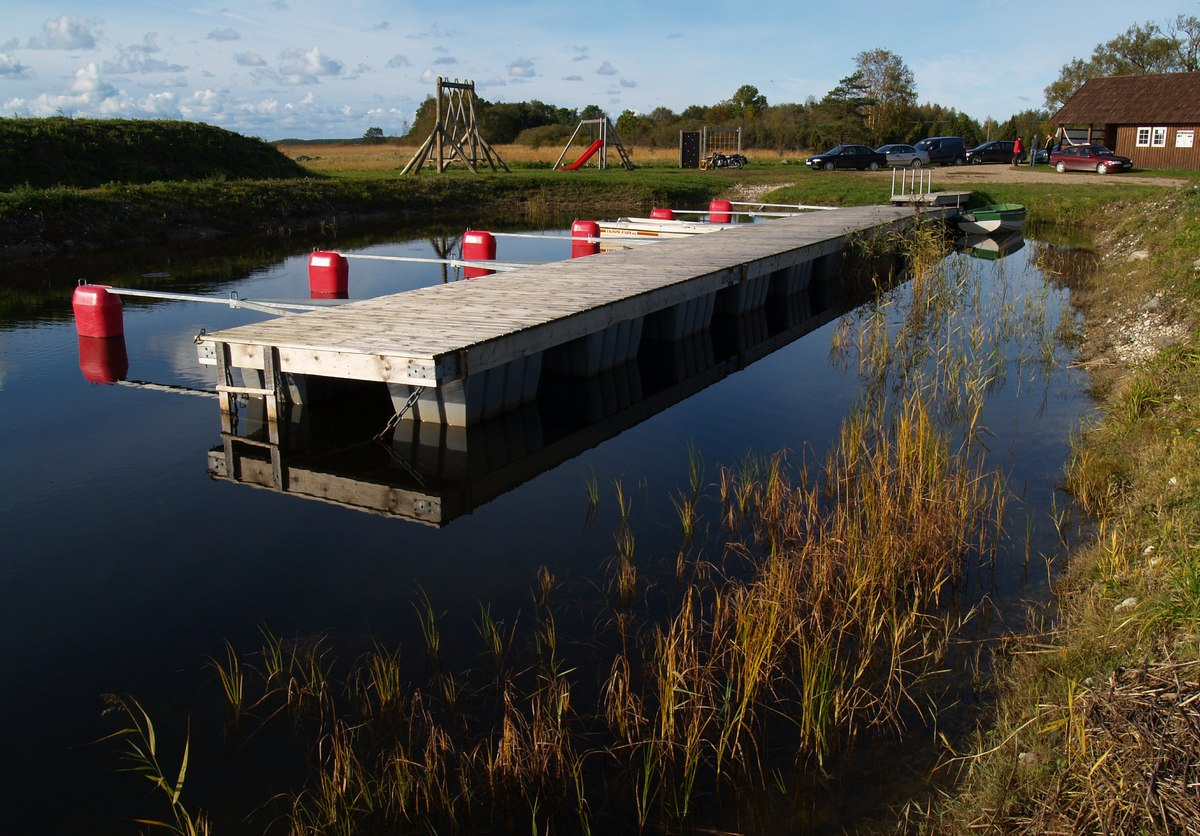
- Harbour in Kavaru.

- Location in Estonia
- Coordinates: 58°16′14″N 24°11′17″E
- Country: Estonia
- County: Pärnu County
- Municipality: Pärnu urban municipality
- First mentioned: 1624

Population (01.01.2011)
  - Total: 48

Kavaru is a village in Pärnu urban municipality, Pärnu County, in southwestern Estonia, on the coast of the Gulf of Riga. It has a population of 48 (as of 1 January 2011).

Kavaru was first mentioned in 1624 as Kawer.
