= Päraküla, Pärnu County =

Village in Estonia

Päraküla
- village
- Location in Estonia
- Coordinates: 58°19′41″N 24°04′52″E
- Country: Estonia
- County: Pärnu County
- Municipality: Pärnu urban municipality

Population (01.01.2011)
  - Total: 11

Päraküla is a village in Pärnu urban municipality, Pärnu County, in southwestern Estonia. It has a population of 11 (as of 1 January 2011).
