= Põhara =

Village in Estonia

- village
- Location in Estonia
- Coordinates: 58°27′36″N 24°13′38″E
- Country: Estonia
- County: Pärnu County
- Municipality: Pärnu urban municipality

Population (01.01.2011)
  - Total: 98

Põhara is a village in Pärnu urban municipality, Pärnu County, in southwestern Estonia. It has a population of 98 (as of 1 January 2011). Prior to the 2017 administrative reform of local governments, it was located in Audru Parish.
