= Lavassaare =

Borough in Estonia

- Borough
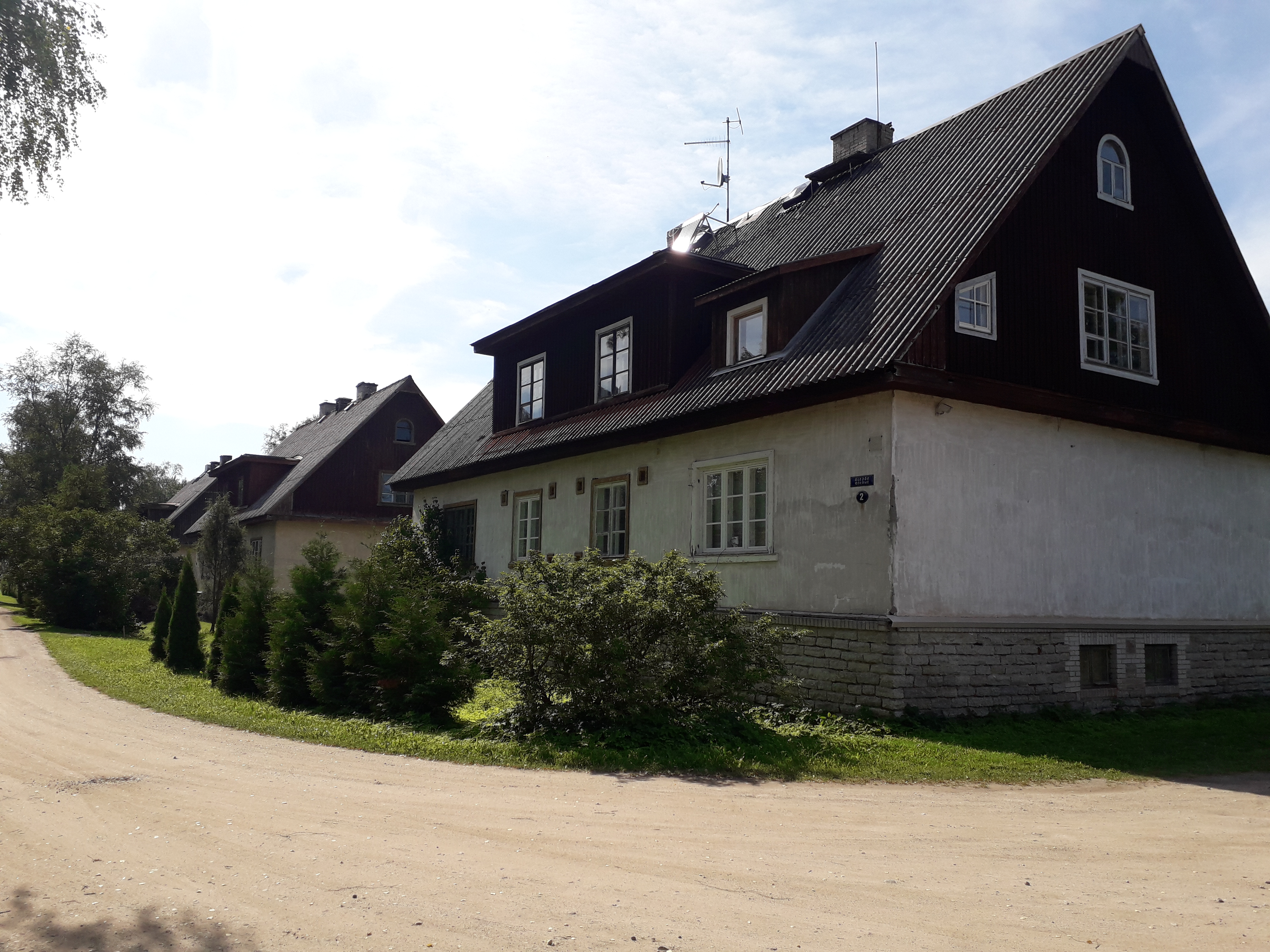

- Location in Estonia
- Coordinates: 58°30′48″N 24°22′20″E
- Country: Estonia
- County: Pärnu County
- Municipality: Pärnu

Area
  - Total: 8.00 km^{2} (3.09 sq mi)

Population (1 January 2009)
  - Total: 539
  - Density: 67.4/km^{2} (175/sq mi)

Lavassaare is a borough (Estonian: alev) in Pärnu municipality, Pärnu County, in southwestern Estonia. It had a population of 539 on 1 January 2009 and an area of 8.00 km^{2} (3.09 sq mi).

Lavassaare is home to the Estonian Railway Museum at Lavassaare, a museum dedicated to the history of the narrow-track railway in Estonia.

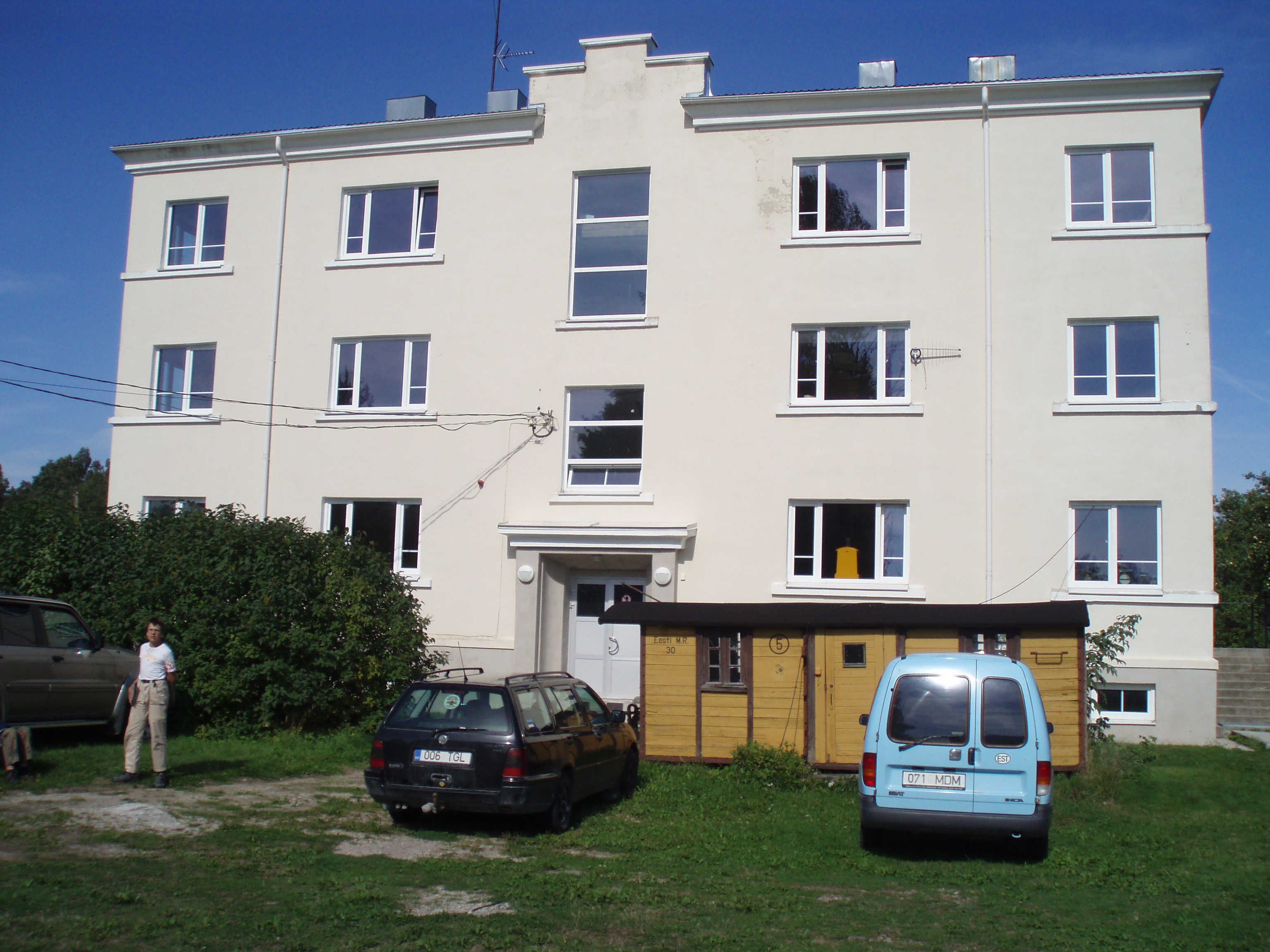
Railway Museum

== See also ==
- Lake Lavassaare
