= Kõpu, Pärnu County =

Village in Estonia

Kõpu
- village
- Location in Estonia
- Coordinates: 58°17′57″N 24°09′45″E
- Country: Estonia
- County: Pärnu County
- Municipality: Pärnu urban municipality

Population (01.01.2011)
  - Total: 11

Kõpu is a village in Pärnu urban municipality, Pärnu County, in southwestern Estonia. It has a population of 11 (as of 1 January 2011).

In 1873 the Pootsi-Kõpu Holy Trinity Apostolic Orthodox church was built.

The eastern half of the village is covered by Lindi Nature Reserve with Lindi bog.

== Pootsi-Kõpu church ==
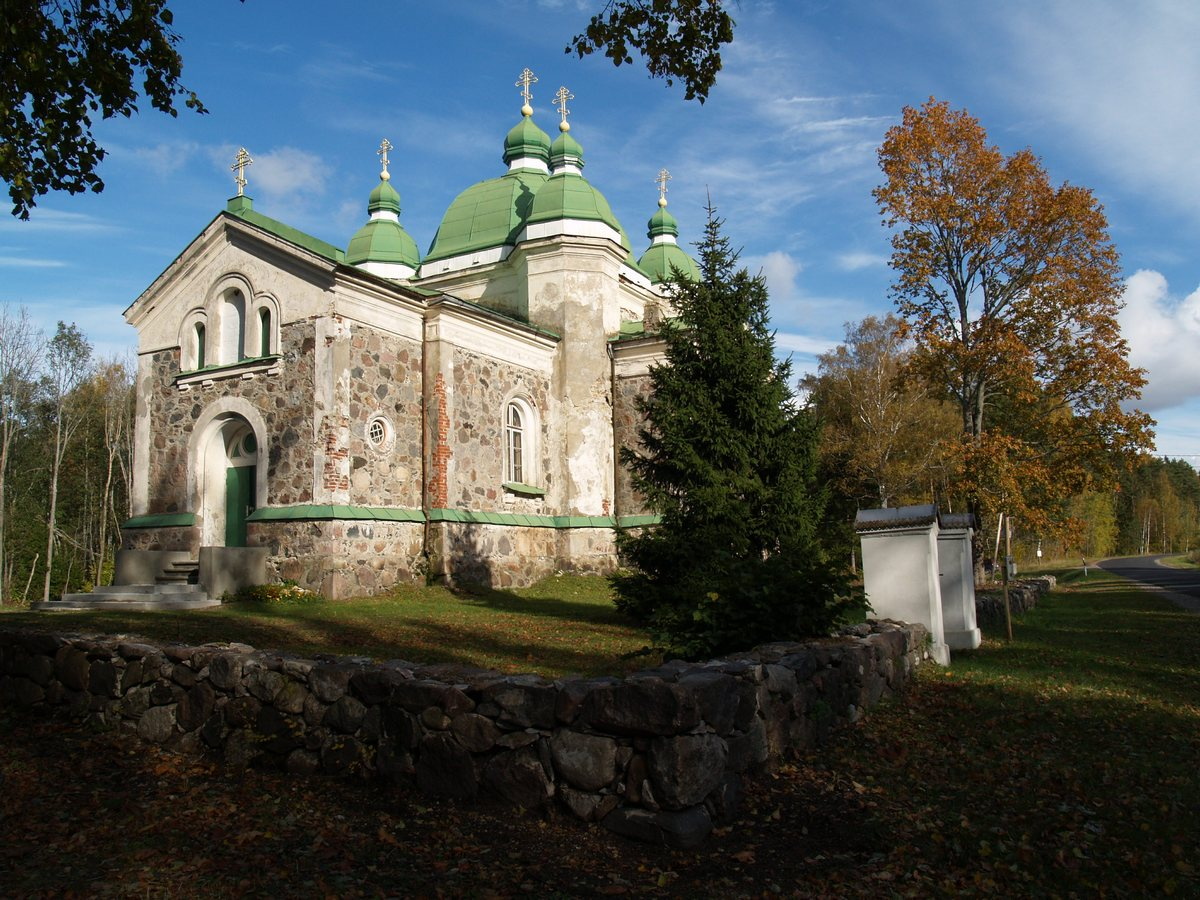
Pootsi-Kõpu church

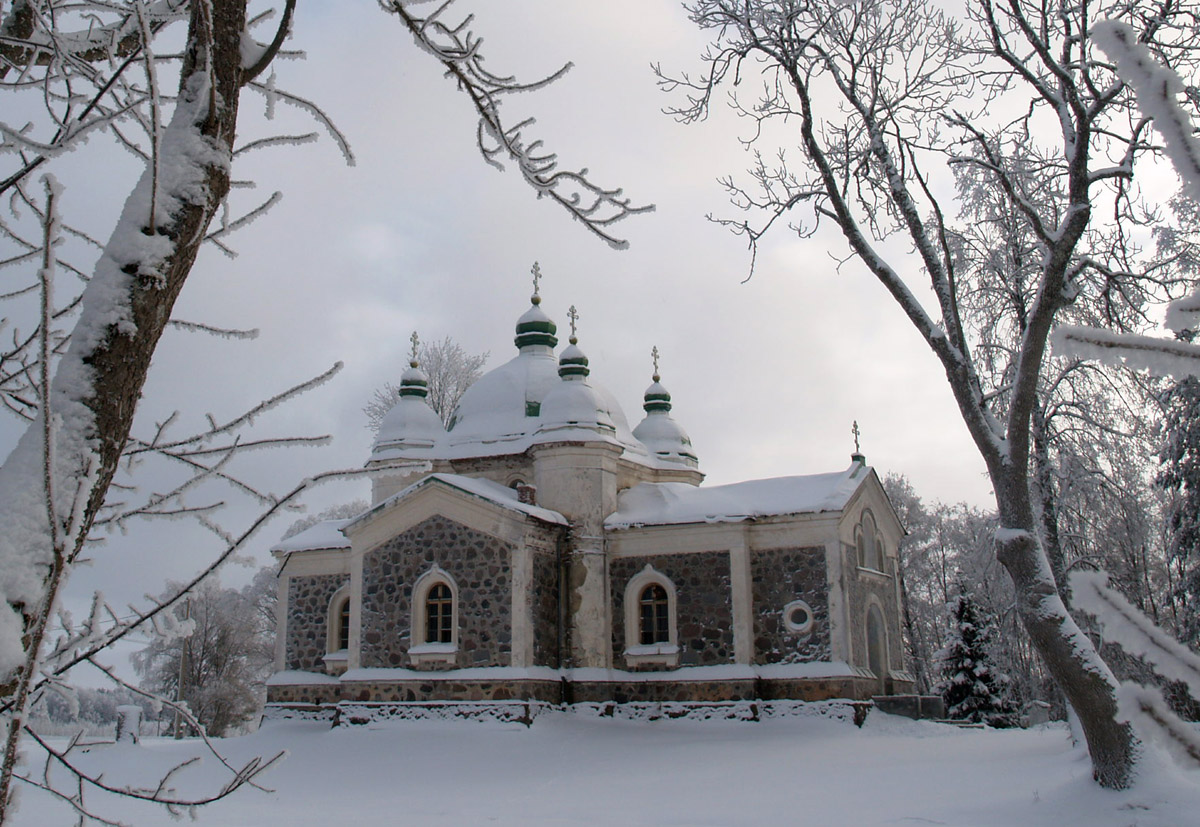
Pootsi-Kõpu church

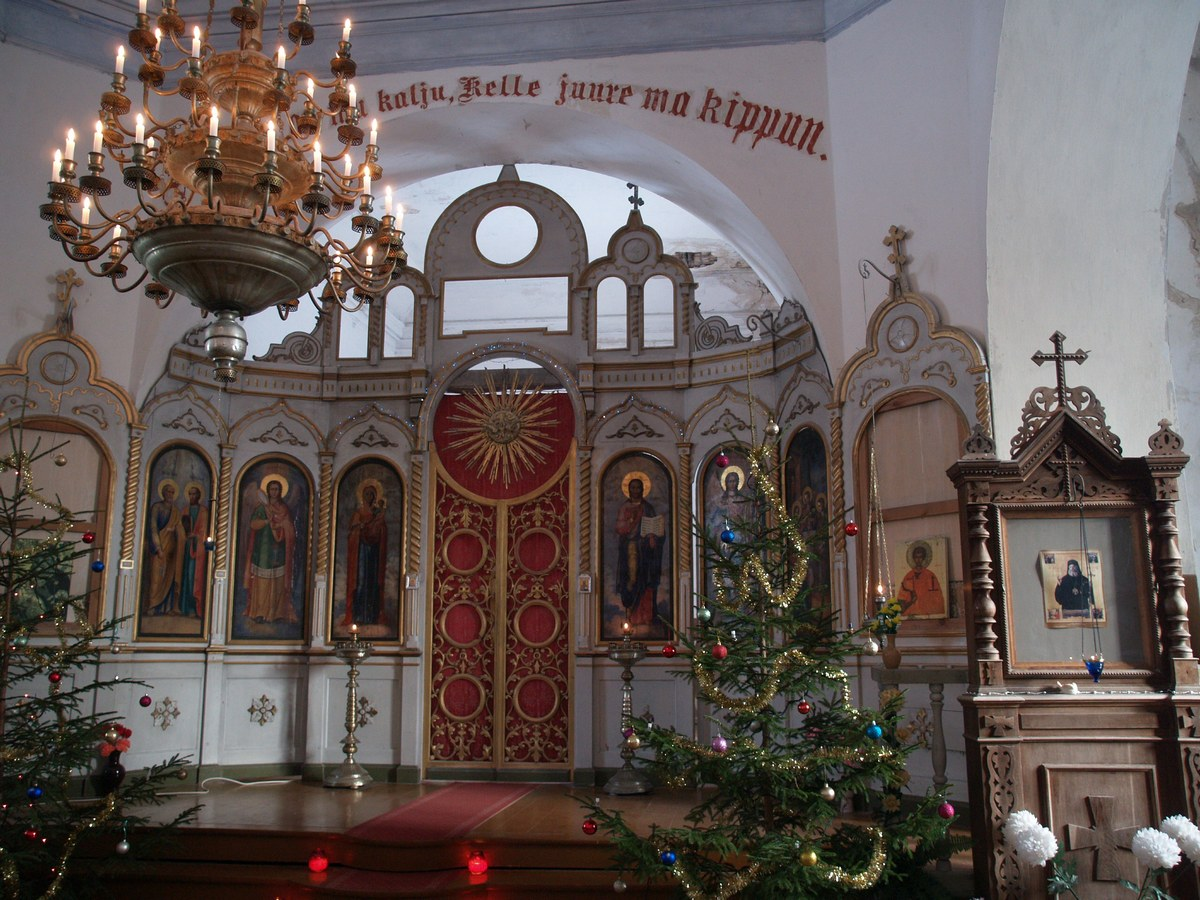
Church interior

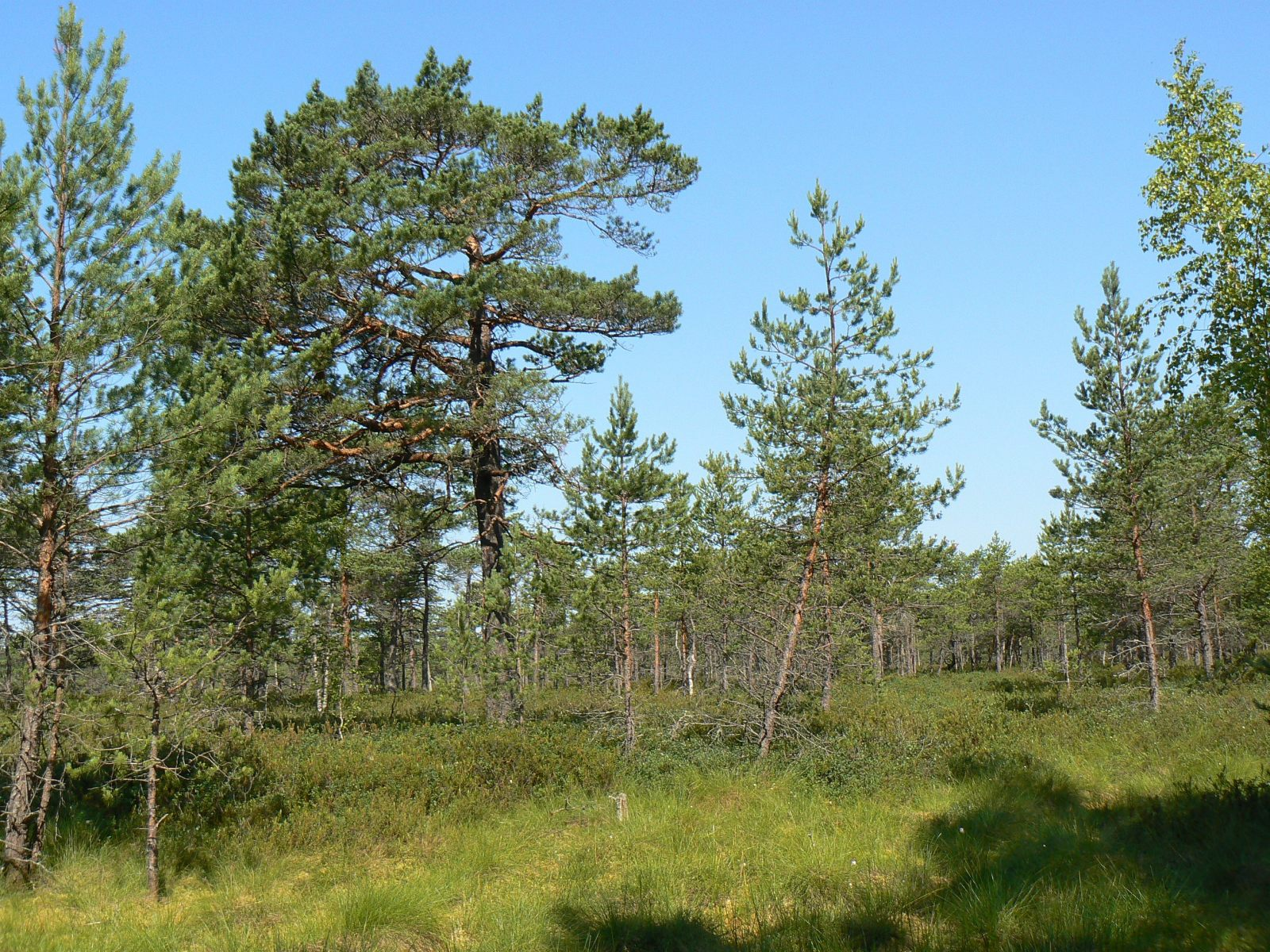
Lindi bog
