= Lake Lavassaare =

Lake in Estonia

- Lavassaare järv (Estonian)
- Location within Estonia
- Location: Pärnu County, Estonia
- Coordinates: 58°33.5′N 24°19′E
- Basin countries: Estonia
- Max. length: 2,760 meters (9,060 ft)
- Max. width: 900 meters (3,000 ft)
- Surface area: 194.5 hectares (481 acres)
- Average depth: 0.8 meters (2 ft 7 in)
- Max. depth: 1.0 meter (3 ft 3 in)
- Water volume: 1,575,000 cubic meters (55,600,000 cu ft)
- Shore length^{1}: 8,290 meters (27,200 ft)
- Surface elevation: 15.5 meters (51 ft)
- Islands: 5
- ^{1} Shore length is not a well-defined measure.

Lake Lavassaare (Estonian: Lavassaare järv) is a lake in Estonia. It is located in the village of Õepa in Lääneranna Parish, Pärnu County.

== Physical description ==
The lake has an area of 194.5 hectares (481 acres), and it has five islands with a combined area of 0.5 hectares (1.2 acres). The lake has an average depth of 0.8 meters (2 ft 7 in) and a maximum depth of 1.0 meter (3 ft 3 in). It is 2,760 meters (9,060 ft) long, and its shoreline measures 8,290 meters (27,200 ft). It has a volume of 1,575,000 cubic meters (55,600,000 cu ft).

== See also ==
- List of lakes of Estonia
