= Porsche Ring =

Motorsport racing track in Estonia

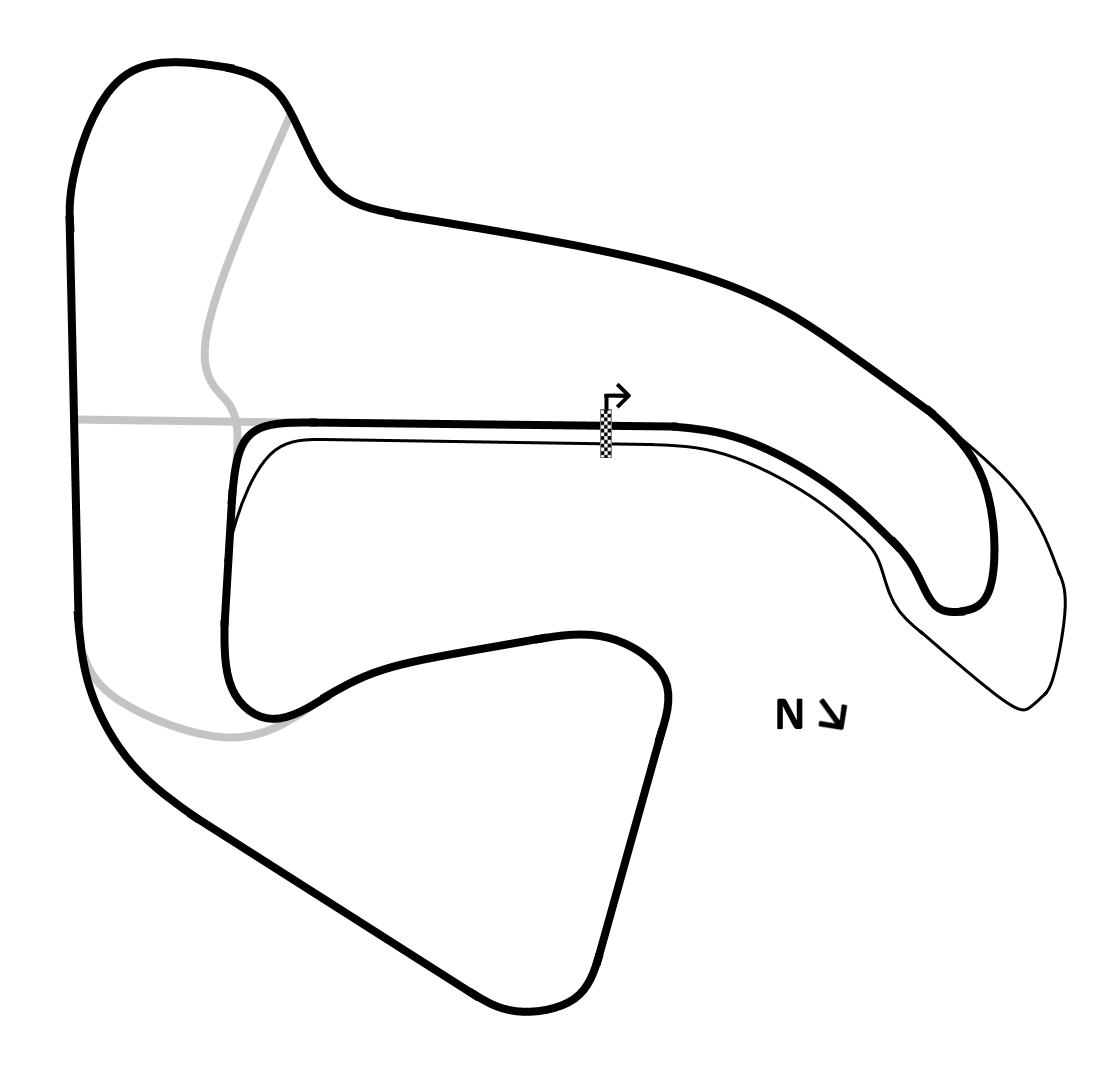
- Location: Papsaare, Pärnu, Estonia
- Coordinates: 58°24′16″N 24°27′00″E
- Opened: 1936
- Former names: Auto24ring (2013–2021); Audru Ring; Pärnu-Ring; Sauga Kolmnurk (1936–1960s)
- Major events: Current: BaTCC (2002–present); Former: SMP F4 Championship (2015, 2017)
- Website: audruring.ee

Full Circuit (2012–present)
- Length: 3.172 km (1.971 mi)
- Turns: 15
- Race lap record: 1:05.775 ( (Estonia) Ralf Aron, Oldbac Kalana, 2026, Sports car racing)

Full Circuit (2001–2011)
- Length: 2.173 km (1.350 mi)
- Turns: 9
- Race lap record: 0:49.766 ( (Russia) Viktor Shaytar, Dallara F304, 2008, F3)

Full Circuit (1989–2000)
- Length: 3.668 km (2.279 mi)
- Turns: 13

Original Circuit (1936–1988)
- Length: 6.100 km (3.790 mi)
- Turns: 10

Porsche Ring (also known as Audru ringrada, auto24ring, Audru Ring, Pärnu Ring, Sauga Ring and EST-Ring) is a motor racing circuit in Papsaare, near Pärnu, Estonia. It is operated by A2 Racing MTÜ and is the only permanent road circuit in Estonia. The circuit hosts rounds of Baltic Touring Car Championship and other Estonian, Finnish, Baltic and North European Zone events. It is also possible to rent track cars and enjoy different driving experiences or drive your own vehicle (car, motorcycle).

== History ==
The first competitions at the location of the circuit were held in the 1930s. The original layout, called Sauga Kolmnurk (Sauga Triangle), was a 6.100 km (3.790 mi) long circuit utilising three public roads: Nurme tee, Sulu-Papsaare tee and Haapsalu maantee. Racing activities at the Kolmnurk ceased in the late 1960s.

A new circuit, designed by Enn Teppand was built in 1989–90. This 3.668 km (2.279 mi) long layout included one of the corners of the original Kolmnurk as well as two, shortened, straights on Nurme tee and Haapsalu maantee. There was also a new section introduced consisting another public road and a short purpose build section.

In 2000, construction of the current circuit begun. The current circuit, opened in 2001, is designed to minimize the use of public roads. The 2.173 km (1.350 mi) long layout uses the sections added in 1990 plus a new straight and a chicane. A 350 m (1,150 ft) long straight on Nurme tee is all that remains of the original 30's circuit.

In 2012 a new section was completed, thus making a total length of 3.200 km (1.988 mi). The entire track went through the upgrade in order to meet FIA Grade 3 and FIM Grade B standards.

From August 2021, the circuit is named as Porsche Ring for 5 years.

== Gallery ==
The 2001–2011 track layout.

== Lap records ==
As of May 2024, the fastest official race lap records at the Porsche Ring are listed as:

Category	Time	Driver	Vehicle	Event
Full Circuit (2012–present): 3.200 km (1.988 mi)
Sports car racing	1:09.111	Tõnis Vanaselja	Oldbac Kalana	2023 Pärnu GT Open round
Formula Renault 2.0	1:11.579	Martin Rump	Tatuus FR2000	2013 1st Pärnu Formula Scandic round
GT3	1:11.792	Jonas Karklys	Audi R8 LMS GT3 Evo II	2023 2nd Pärnu BATCC round
Formula 4	1:11.890	Nikita Troitskiy	Tatuus F4-T014	2015 2nd Pärnu SMP F4 round
Superbike	1:12.384	Hannes Soomer	BMW M1000R	2025 Feltcar Estonian Grand Prix
Porsche Carrera Cup	1:13.645	Leo Messenger	Porsche 911 (992) GT3 Cup	2024 1st Pärnu BATCC round
GT1 (GTS)	1:14.236	Pertti Kuismanen	Chrysler Viper GTS-R	2016 Pärnu BATCC round
Supersport	1:14.898	Hannes Soomer	Yamaha YZF-R6	2016 Pärnu Estonian Supersport round
Formula Renault 1.6	1:16.011	Martin Rump	Signatech FR 1.6	2013 Pärnu Formula Renault 1.6 Nordic round
Formula Ford	1:17.549	Aleksanteri Huovinen	Van Diemen LA10	2014 Pärnu Finnish Formula Ford round
Supersport 300	1:25.661	Niko Lehtiranta	KTM RC 390	2019 Pärnu Estonian Supersport 300 round
Renault Clio Cup	1:26.638	Robert Helling	Renault Clio IV RS	2014 Pärnu Renault Clio Cup JTCC round
Full Circuit (2001–2011): 1.475 km (0.917 mi)
Formula Three	0:49.766	Viktor Shaytar	Dallara F304	2008 Pärnu Finnish F3 round
Formula Renault 2.0	0:50.054	Jesse Krohn	Tatuus FR2000	2008 Pärnu Formula Renault 2.0 NEZ round
