= Audru =

Borough in Estonia

- Small borough
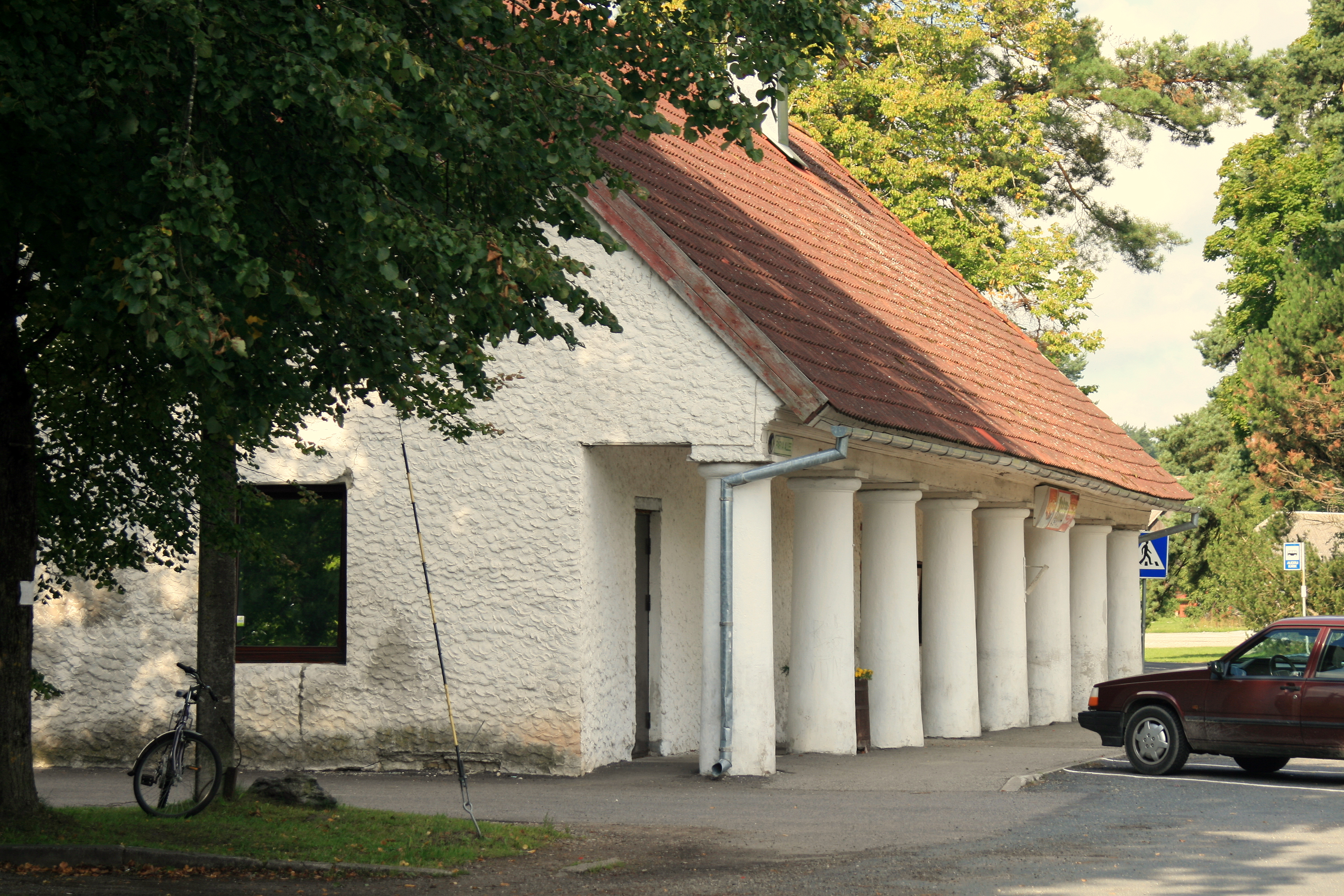

- Location in Estonia
- Coordinates: 58°24′44″N 24°21′19″E
- Country: Estonia
- County: Pärnu County
- Municipality: Pärnu

Population (2011 Census)
  - Total: 1,492

Audru (German: Audern) is a small borough (Estonian: alevik) in Pärnu municipality, Pärnu County, southwestern Estonia. Before the administrative reform in 2017, Audru was the administrative centre of Audru Parish. At the 2011 Census, the settlement's population was 1,492.

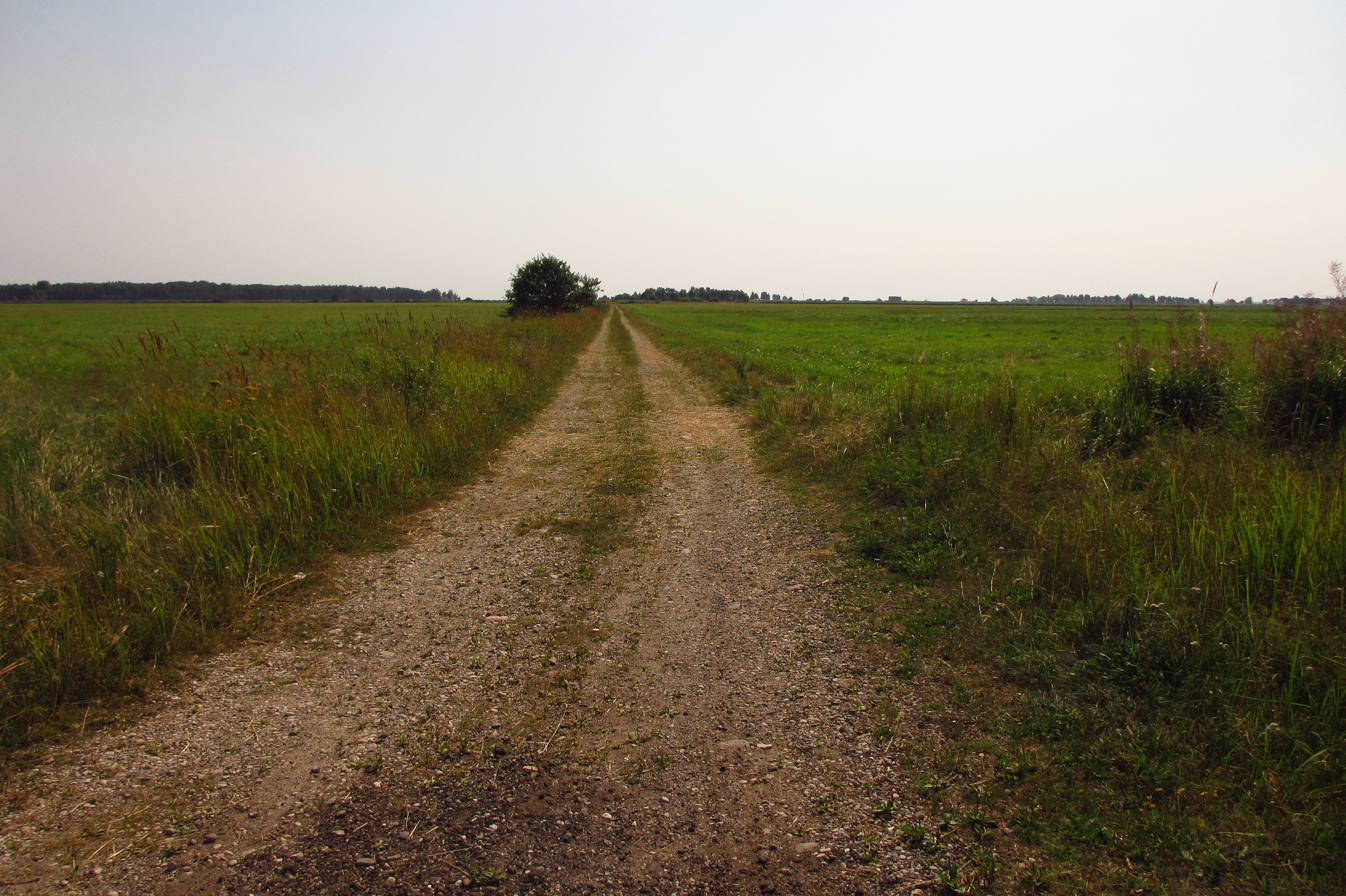
Audru polder near Audru

== Notable residents ==
- Aleksander Kunileid (1845–1875), Estonian composer, was born in Audru.
- Adolf Pilar von Pilchau (1851–1925), Baltic German politician, regent of the United Baltic Duchy, was the owner of Audru Manor.

== See also ==
- Audru Ring
