= Pärnu Bay =

Bay in Estonia

- Pärnu laht (Estonian)
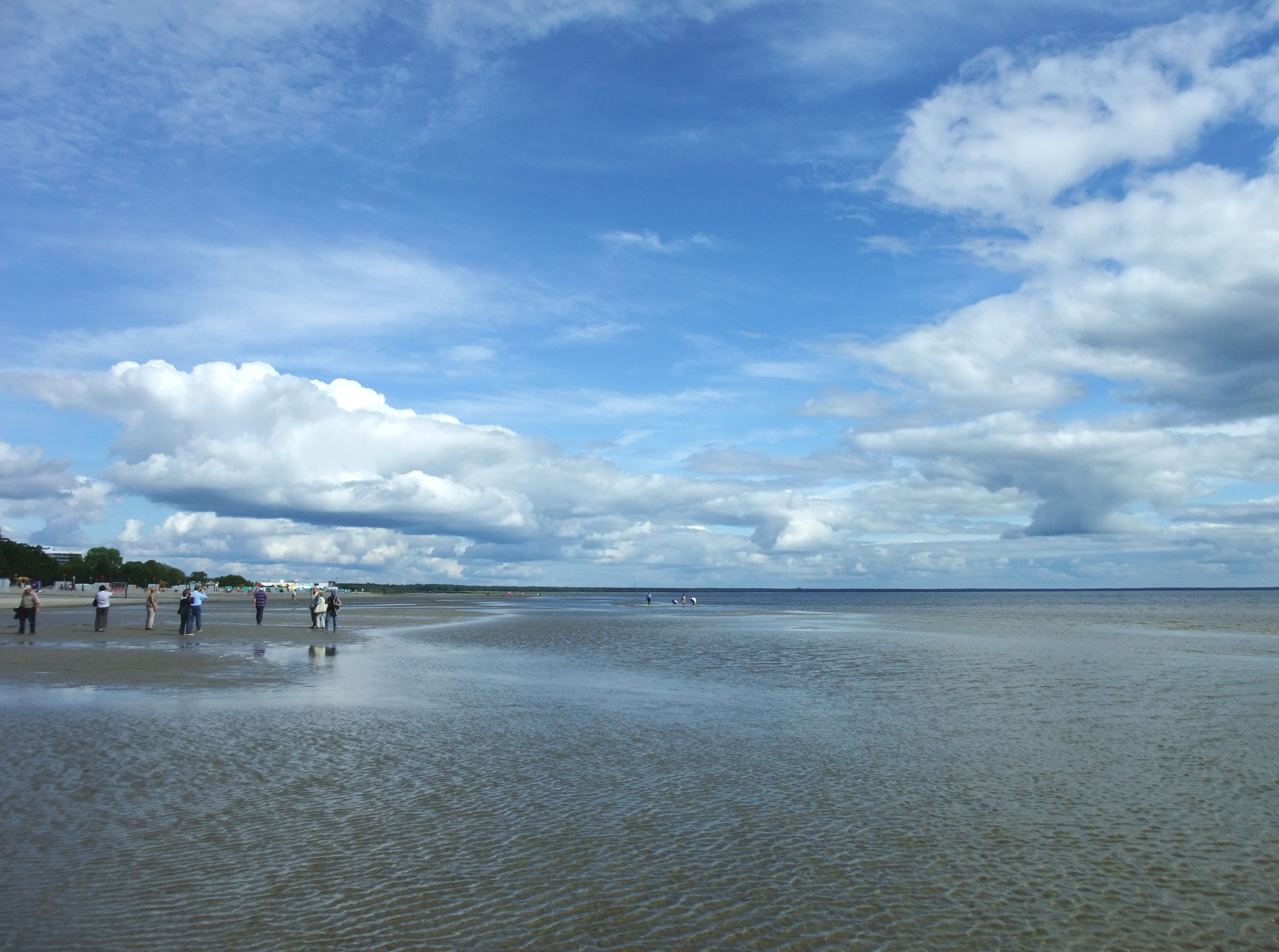
- View of the bay in Pärnu.

- Location within Estonia
- Coordinates: 58°18′00″N 24°24′00″E
- River sources: Pärnu
- Ocean/sea sources: Gulf of Riga, Baltic Sea
- Surface area: 400 km^{2} (150 sq mi)
- Max. depth: 12 m (39 ft)
- Salinity: 5.5 ppm
- Shore length^{1}: 140 km (87 mi)
- Settlements: Pärnu
- ^{1} Shore length is not a well-defined measure.

Pärnu Bay (Estonian: Pärnu laht) is a bay in the northeastern part of the Gulf of Livonia (Gulf of Riga), in southern Estonia.

== Geography ==
It has an area of 411 km^{2}. The maximum depth in the mouth of the bay is 12 m. The banks are low-lying, sandy in some places. The salinity of the water in the bay is 0-0,8 ppm in the spring and up to 5.5 ppm in autumn.

There are several rivers flowing into the gulf, the largest is the Pärnu River.

The bay is also Estonia's most important coastal fishing area.
