= Nätsi-Võlla Nature Reserve =

Protected area in Estonia

- Location within Estonia
- Location: Estonia
- Nearest city: Pärnu
- Coordinates: 58°27′33″N 24°06′34″E

Nätsi-Võlla Nature Reserve is a nature reserve situated in western Estonia, in Pärnu County, made up of several bogs that together form the largest bog area in Pärnu County.

It is an internationally important bird area, with species such as golden eagle, merlin and ruff. The bogs are rich in cloudberries and cranberries. The bogs of Nätsi-Võlla host numerous migratory species, such as the tundra swan (Cygnus columbianus). It also sees an annual congregation of numerous wader species. The bogs are also home to a significant percentage of the total national breeding population of such species as common crane (Grus grus) and black-tailed godwit (Limosa limosa). Other birds found here are whooper swan (Cygnus cygnus), Montagu's harrier (Circus pygargus), Eurasian golden plover (Pluvialis apricaria) and Eurasian eagle-owl (Bubo bubo)

== Vegetation ==
The reserve comprises broadleaf deciduous woodland, mixed woodland, and native coniferous forests. There are also extensive wetlands system consisting of fens, transition mires and springs, raised bogs and standing freshwater.
