= Tõstamaa Parish =

Former municipality of Estonia

Coordinates: 58.333°N 23.999°E

Tõstamaa Parish Tõstamaa vald
- Former municipality of Estonia
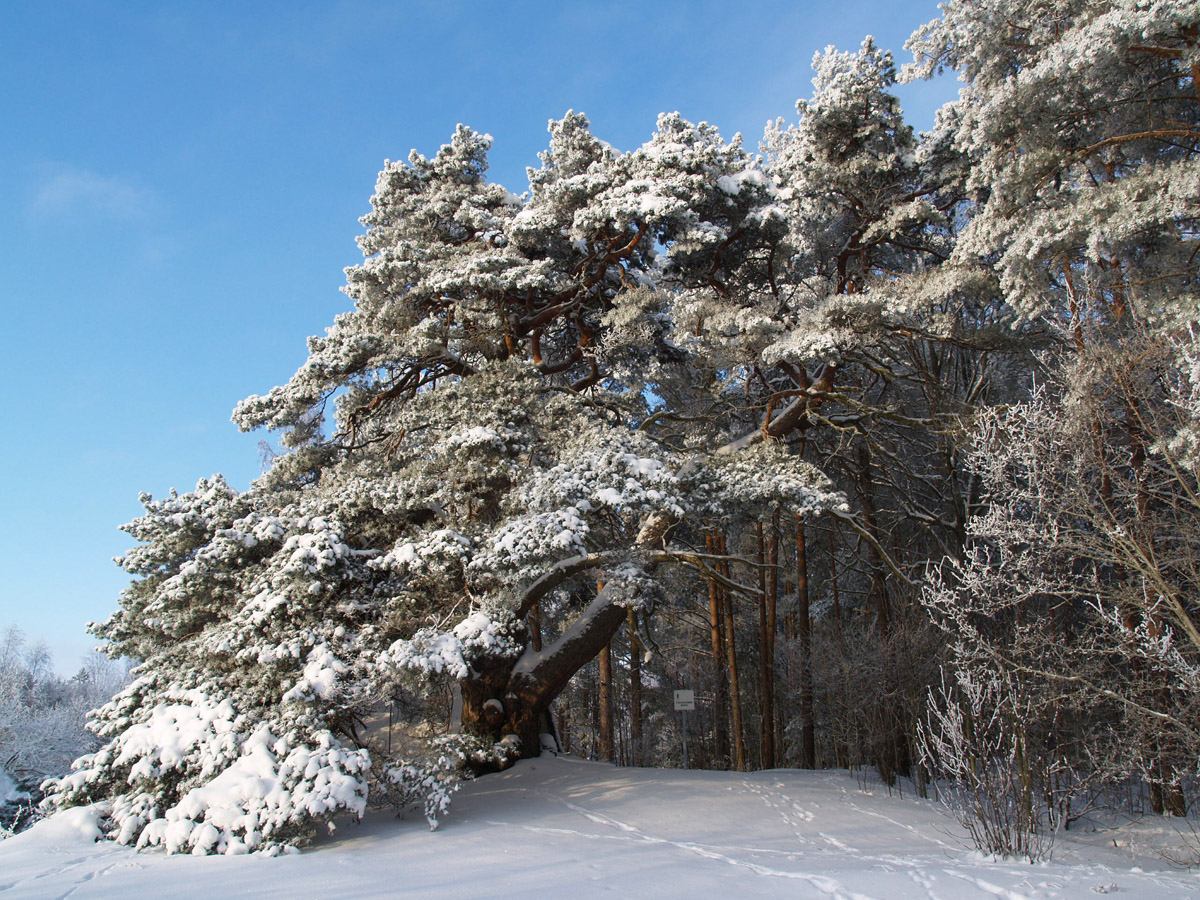
- Tõrvanõmme pine

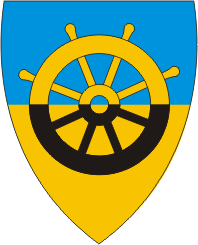
- Flag Coat of arms

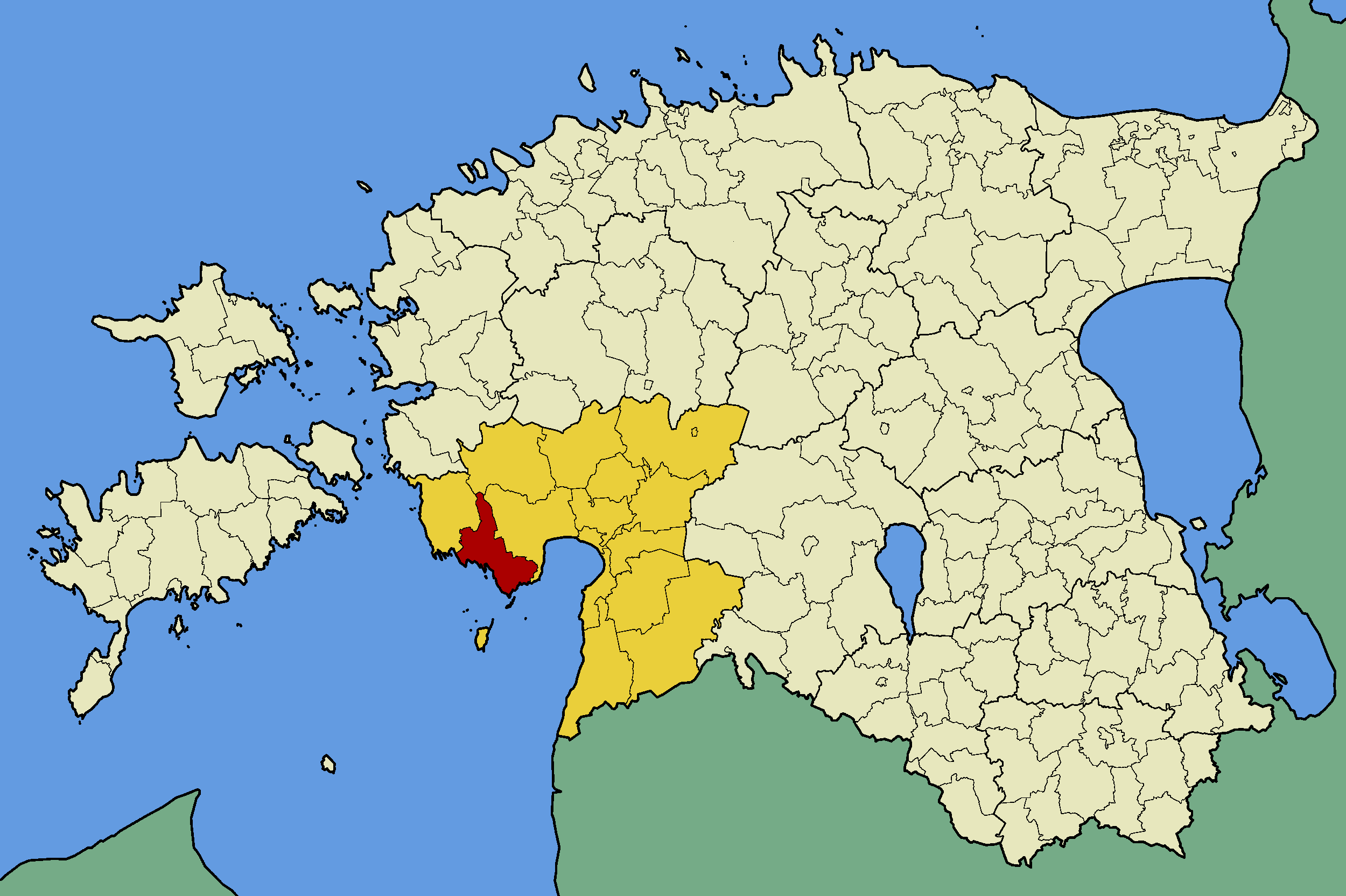
- Tõstamaa Parish within Pärnu County.
- Country: Estonia
- County: Pärnu County
- Administrative centre: Tõstamaa

Area
  - Total: 261.01 km^{2} (100.78 sq mi)

Population (01.01.2006)
  - Total: 1,572
  - Density: 6.023/km^{2} (15.60/sq mi)
- Website: www.tostamaa.ee

Tõstamaa Parish (Estonian: Tõstamaa vald) was a rural municipality in southwestern Estonia. It was a part of Pärnu County. The municipality had a population of 1,572 (as of 1 January 2009) and covered an area of 261.01 km^{2}.

Tõstamaa Parish covered part of the flat seashore of western Pärnu County, a low, swampy coastal area bordered by an elevated chain of sand dunes. Behind the dunes spreads a slightly wavy drumlin, where higher places have been reclaimed, but lower ones have remained swampy or meadowland and covered with scattered foliage. And, although Tõstamaa should mean "high land", its populace have long lived not off the land, but off the sea.

Several islands and islets in the Gulf of Riga, including Sorgu and Manilaid, belong to Tõstamaa Parish.

Tõstamaa is home to the historic Tõstamaa Keskkool.

== Settlements ==
Small borough

Tõstamaa

Villages

Alu - Ermistu - Kastna - Kavaru - Kiraste - Kõpu - Lao - Lõuka - Manija - Männikuste - Päraküla - Peerni - Pootsi - Rammuka - Ranniku - Seliste - Tõhela - Tõlli - Värati

== Gallery ==
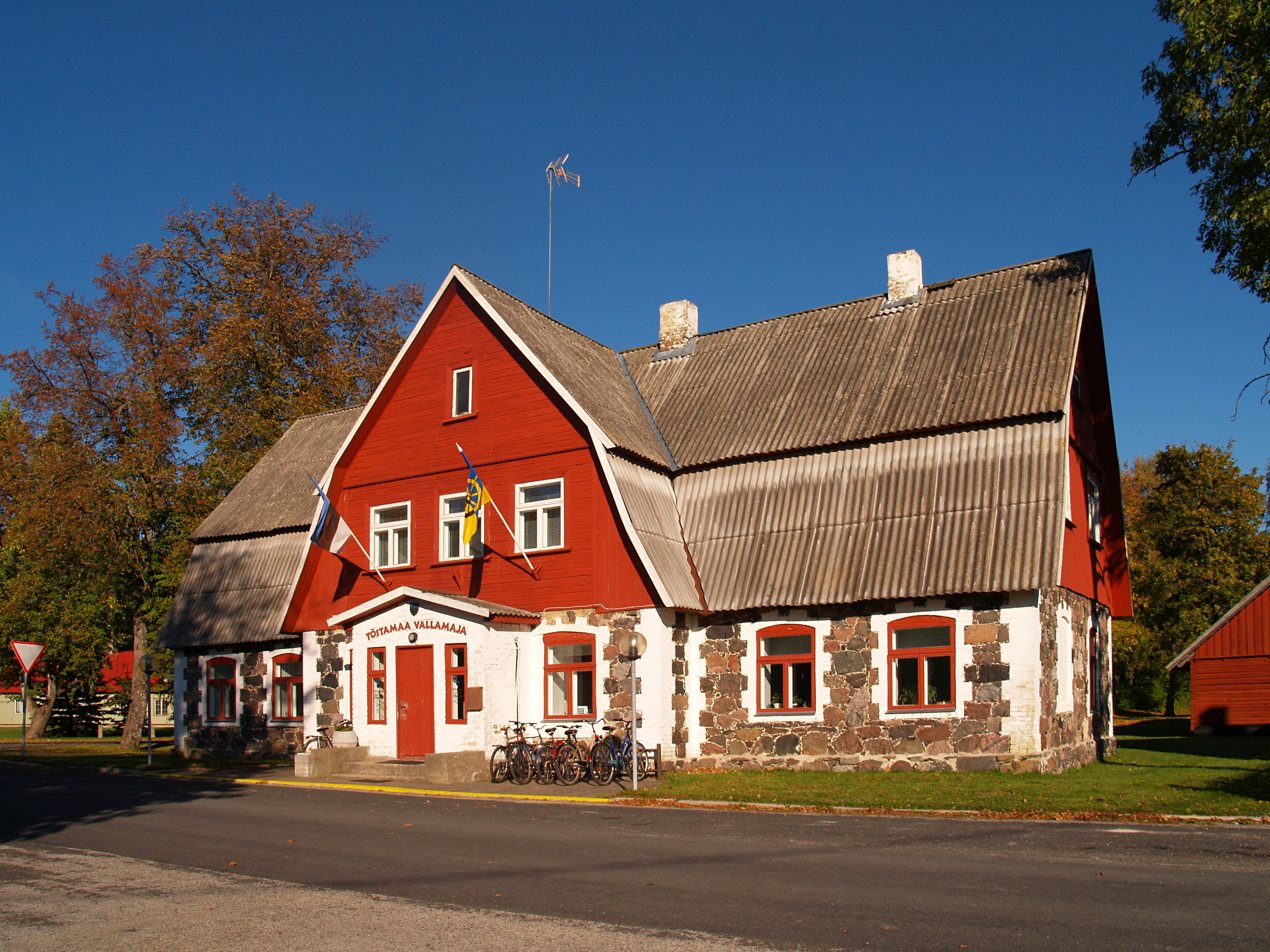
Tõstamaa community house

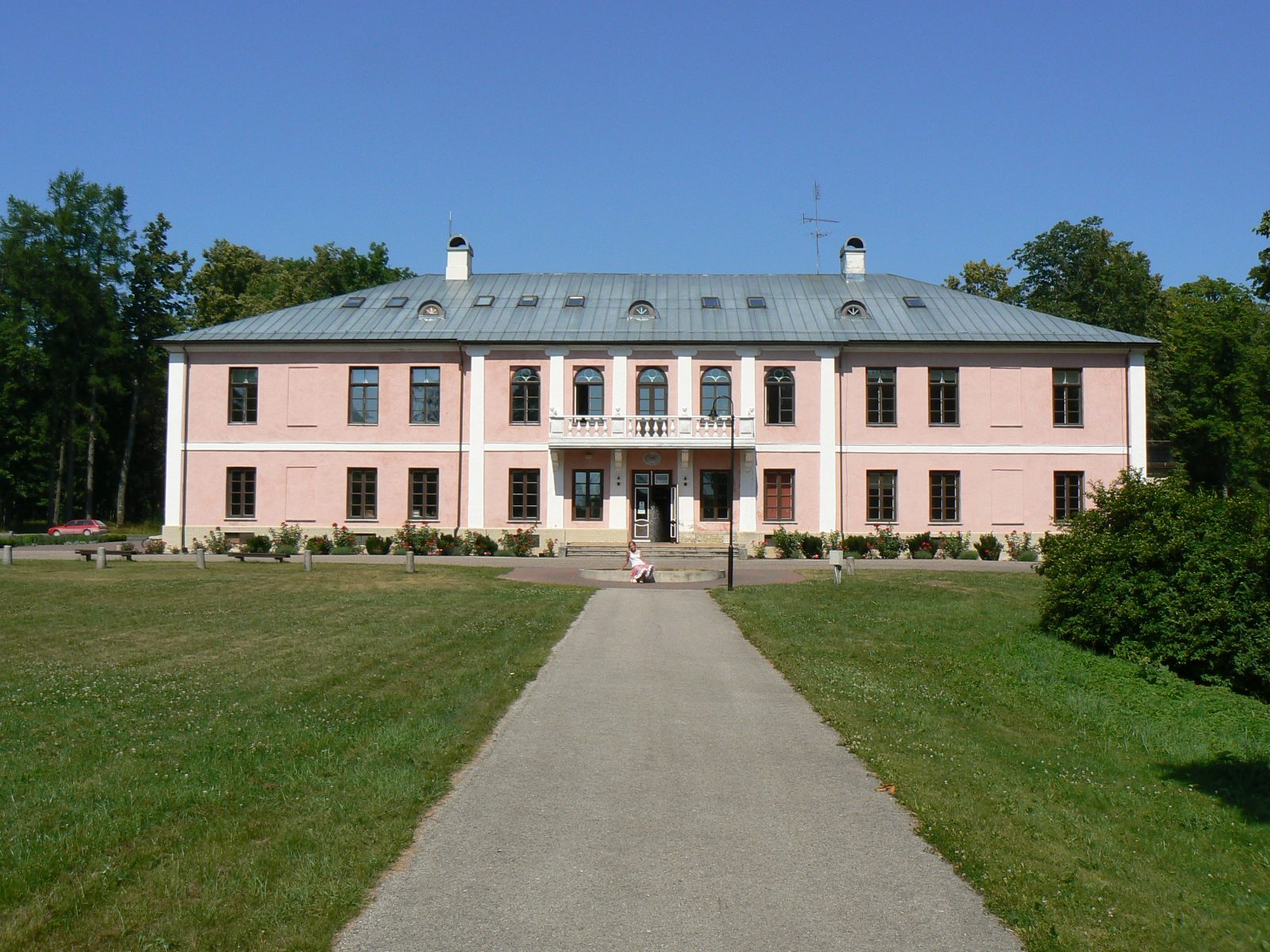
Tõstamaa manor house

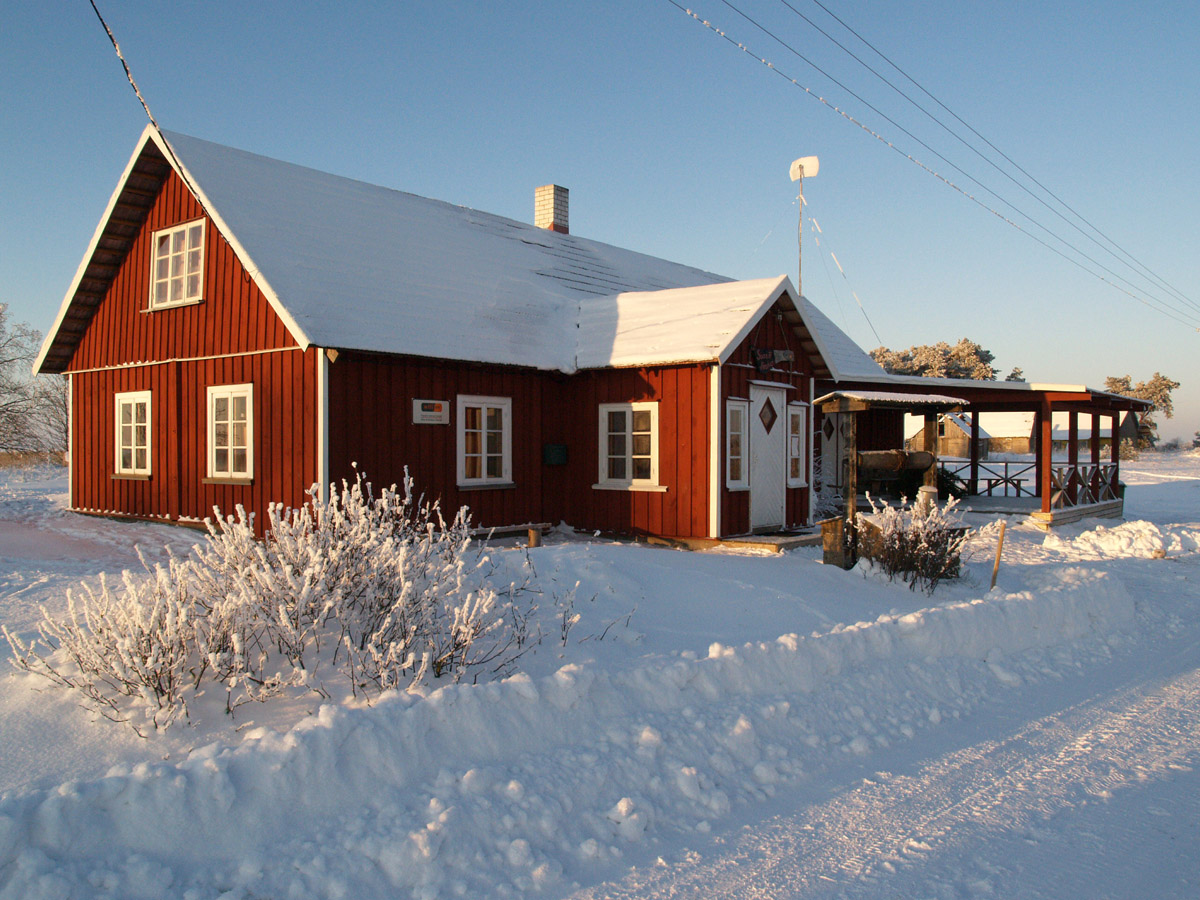
Manija village centre on Manilaid island

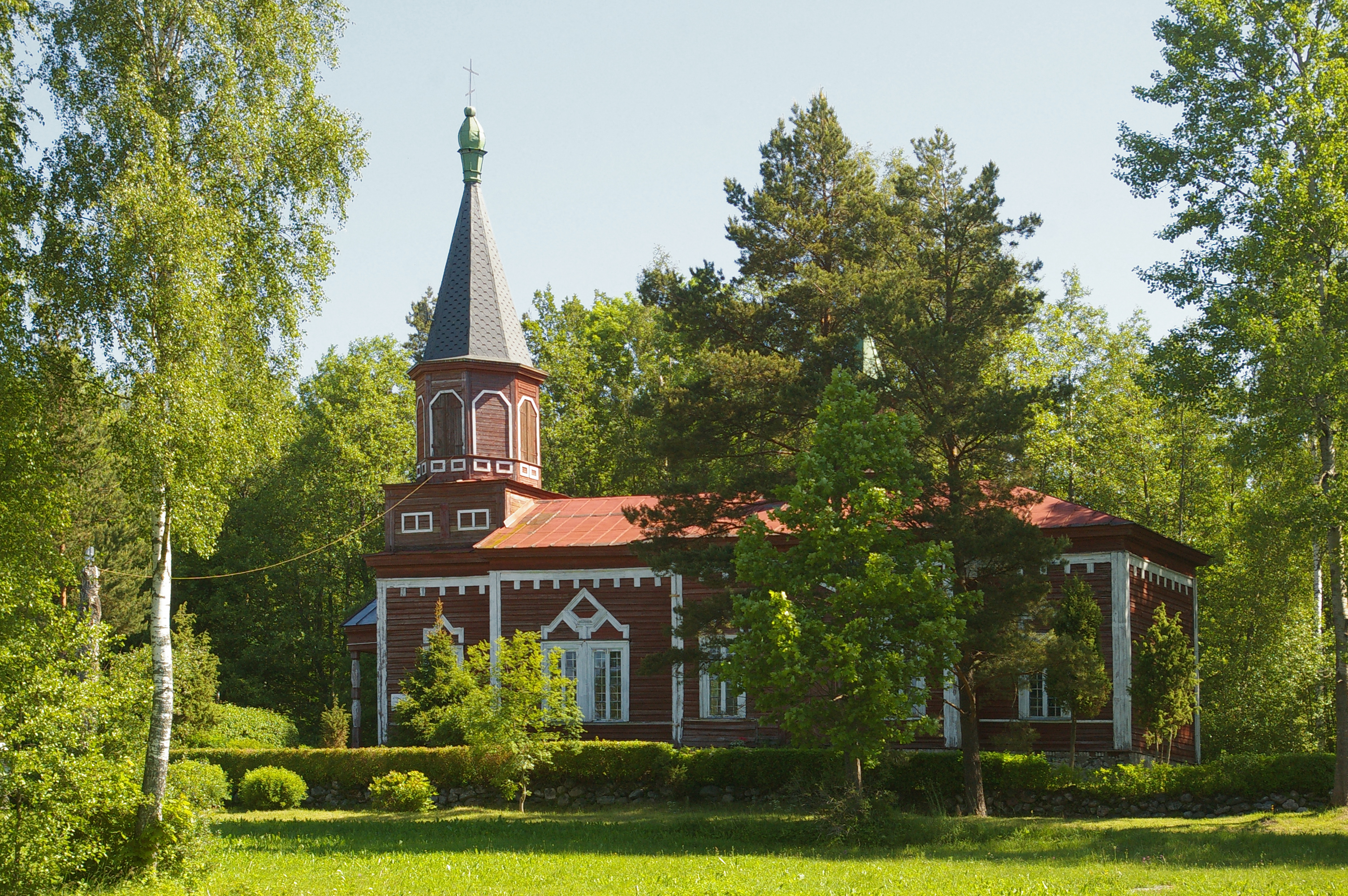
Seliste church

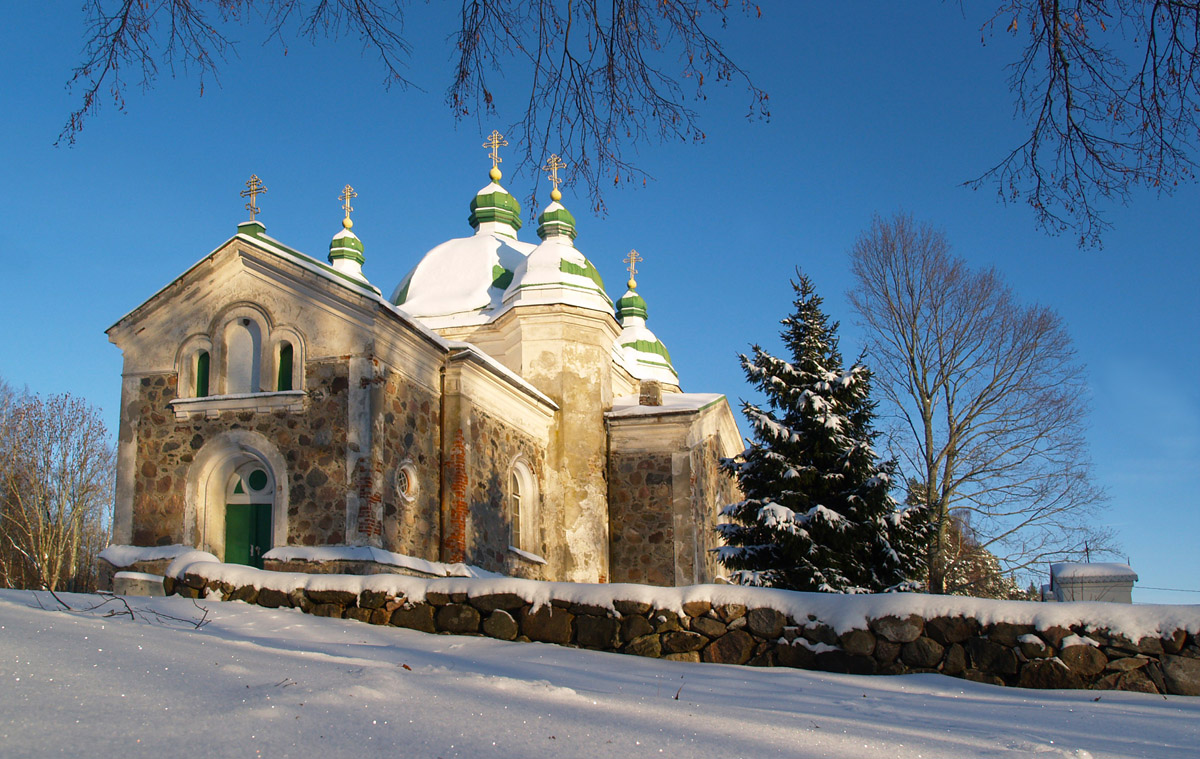
Pootsi-Kõpu church

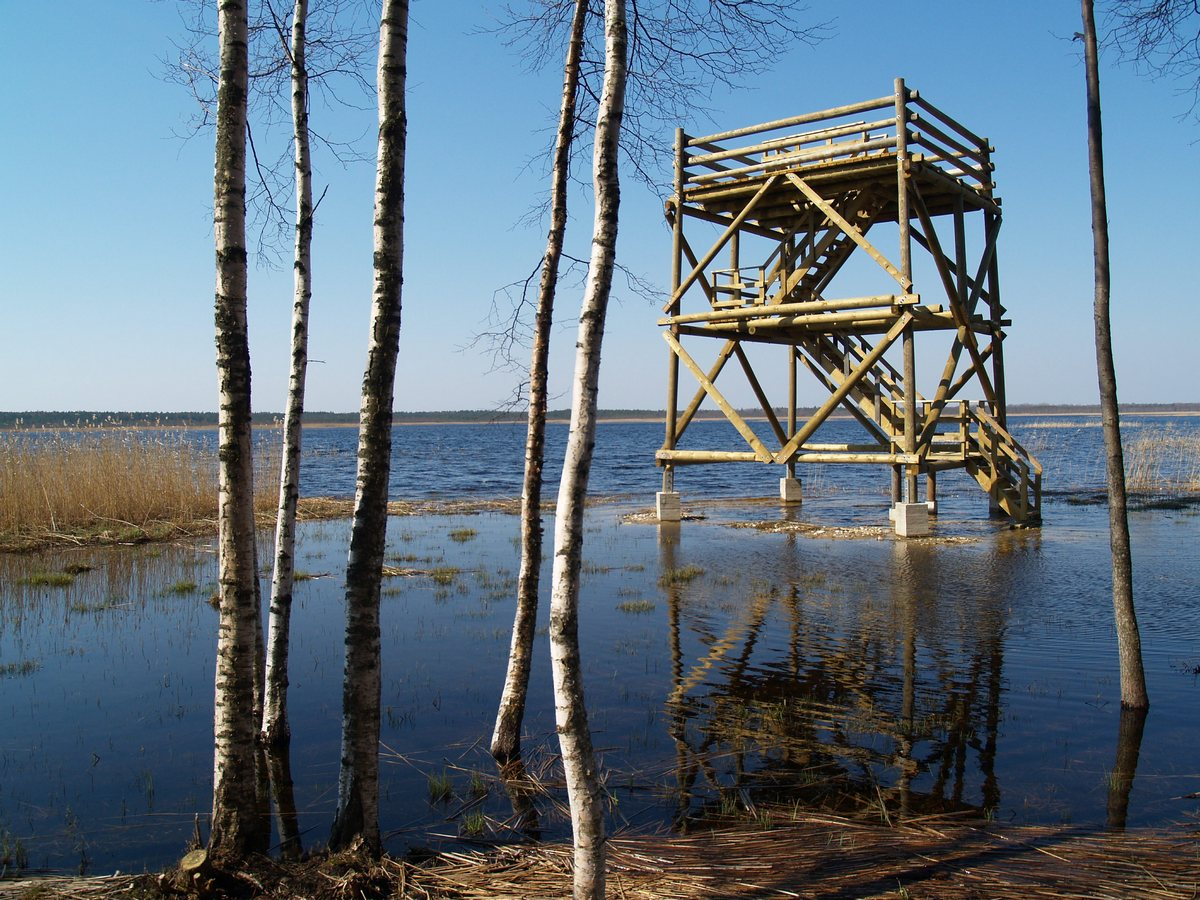
Lake Ermistu

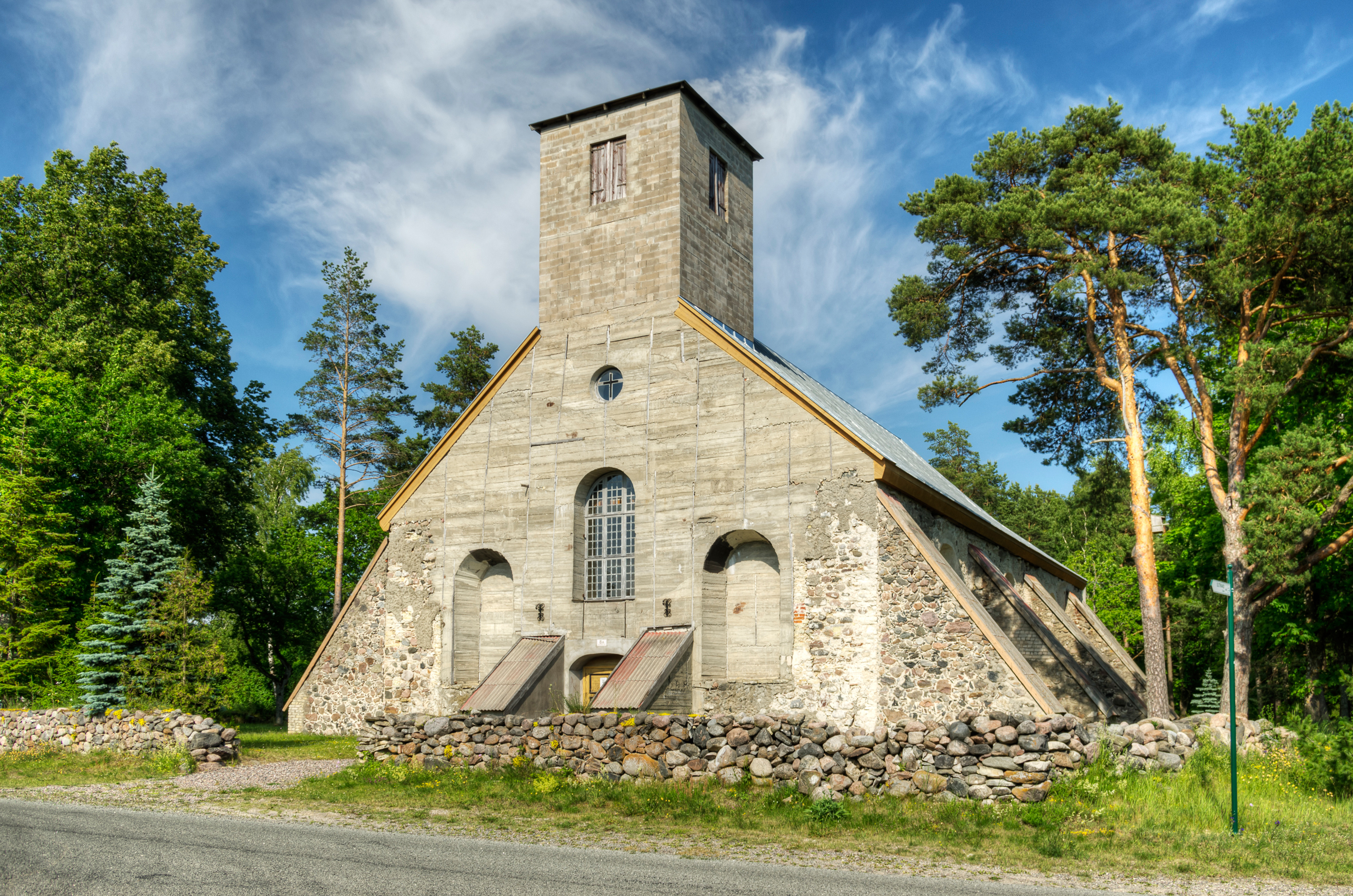
Tõstamaa church

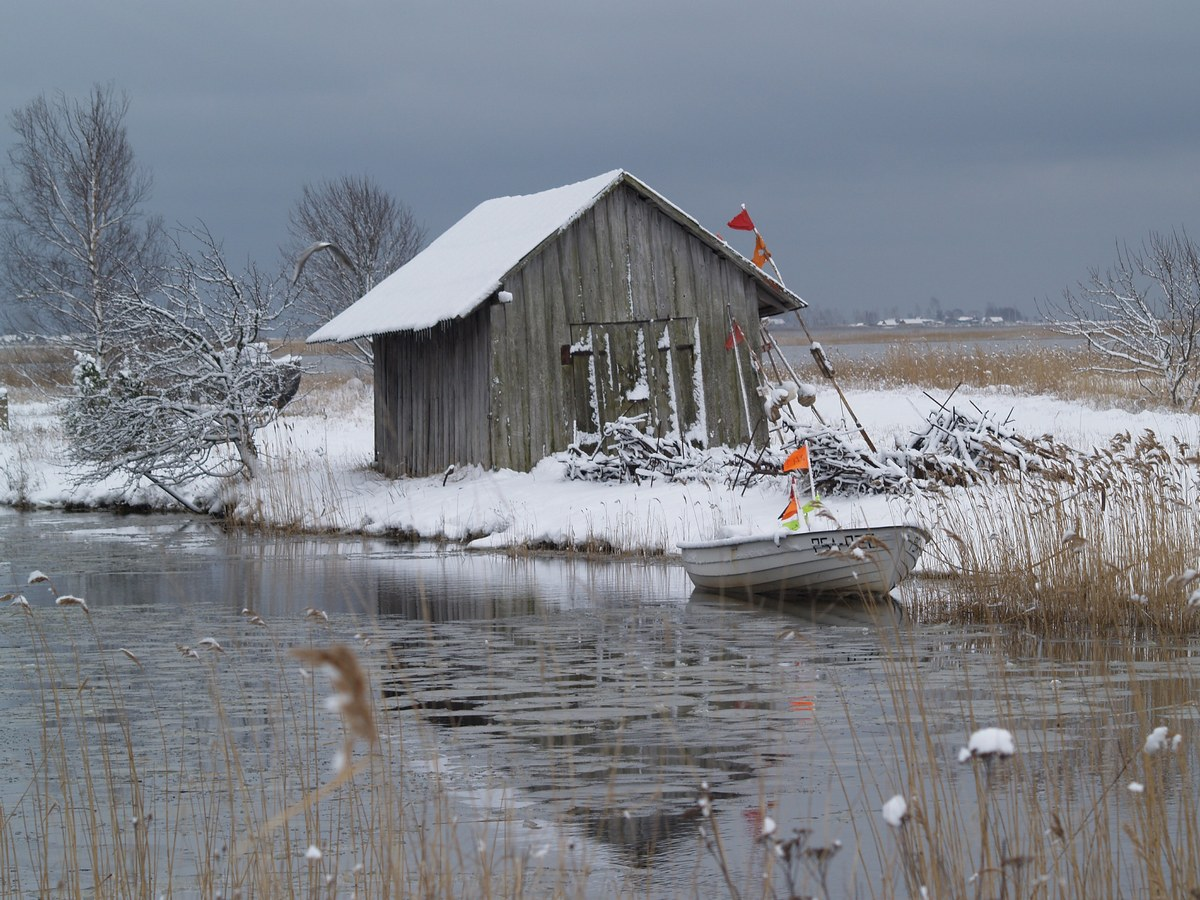
Peerni harbor
