= Värati =

Village in Estonia

- village
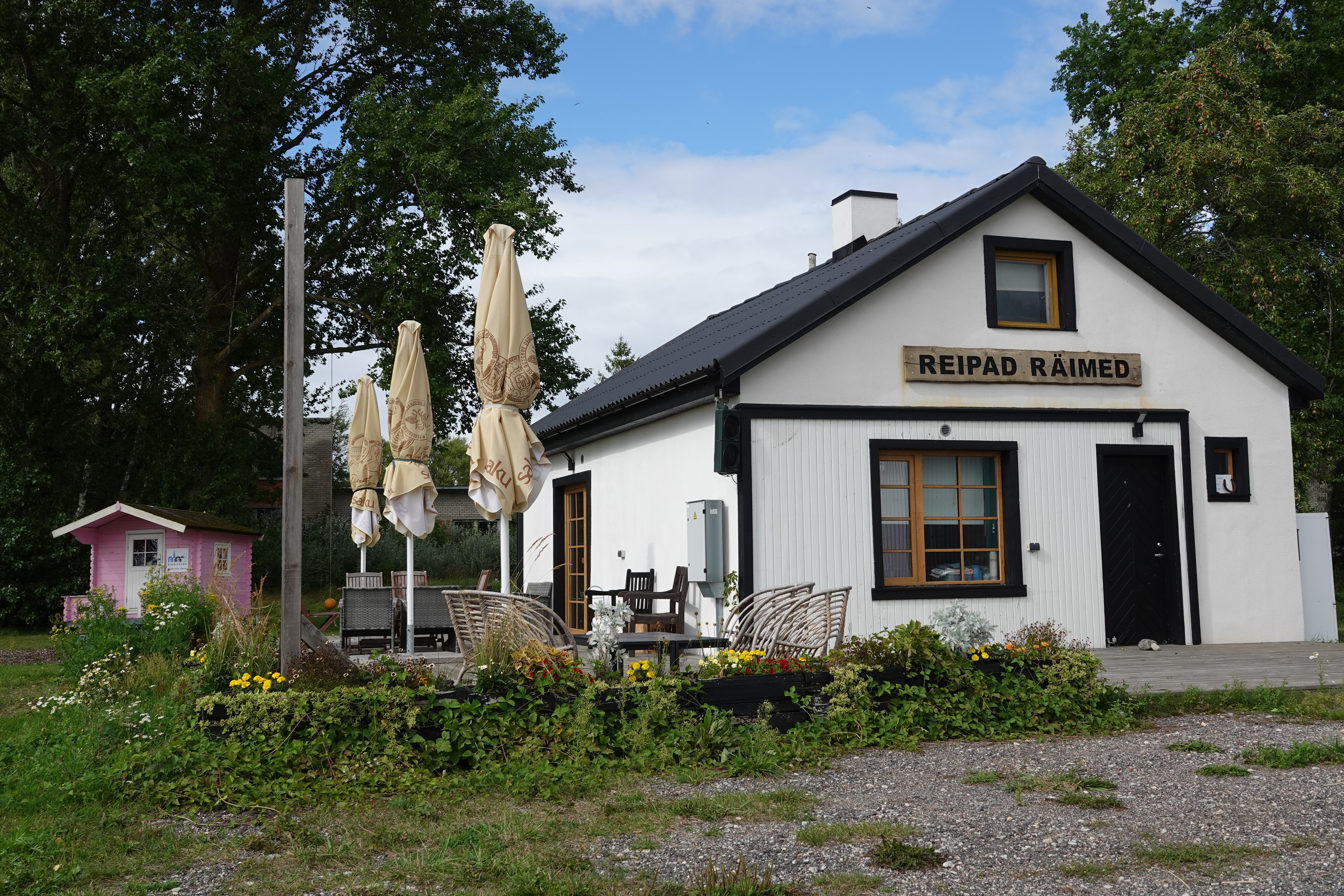
- Café at Värati Harbour

- Location in Estonia
- Coordinates: 58°18′40″N 23°59′32″E
- Country: Estonia
- County: Pärnu County
- Municipality: Pärnu municipality

Population (01.01.2011)
  - Total: 41

Värati is a village in Pärnu municipality, Pärnu County, in southwestern Estonia. It is located just south of Tõstamaa, the administrative centre of the municipality. Värati has a population of 41 (as of 1 January 2011).
