= Tõlli =

Tõlli may refer to several places in Estonia:

- Tõlli, Pärnu County, village in Pärnu municipality, Pärnu County
- Tõlli, Saare County, village in Saaremaa Parish, Saare County

== See also ==
- Tolli, village in Märjamaa Parish, Rapla County
