= Rammuka =

Rammuka may refer to several places in Estonia:

- Rammuka, Pärnu County, village in Tõstamaa Parish, Pärnu County
- Rammuka, Võru County, village in Misso Parish, Võru County
