= Artur Uritamm =

Estonian composer (1901–1982)

- Born: 9 September 1901; Tõstamaa, Estonia
- Died: 8 July 1982 (aged 80); Pärnu, then part of Estonian SSR, Soviet Union
- Occupations: Composer and organist

Artur Uritamm (9 September 1901 in Tõstamaa – 8 July 1982 in Pärnu) was an Estonian classical composer, organist, and pedagogue.

Uritamm was a student of Artur Kapp at the Estonian Academy of Music and Theatre, graduating in 1937. He was on the faculty of the same school from 1940 until 1941, during which time he received a number of awards for his compositions. Tiring of the academic atmosphere and unable to find a position at the conservatories in Leningrad or Moscow, he resigned to work in a mill in Koluvere, managed by his brother. He was asked by Artur Kapp, then director of the conservatory, to reconsider his decision, and he returned to his alma mater in 1945, staying until 1946 and teaching music theory. During the latter period he also served as the director of the Estonian Music Foundation and as the music editor of the newspaper Sirp ja Vasar (Hammer and Sickle). He was ousted from his positions by the Soviets in 1946; he was also expelled from the Composers' Union for refusing to write music in the approved manner. From 1946 to 1947 he served as the organist at the Estonian Evangelical Lutheran Church of St. John in Kullamaa, following in the footsteps of Johannes Tobias, whose son Rudolf, considered the founder of Estonian classical music, also spent much time at the church. From 1950 to 1955 Uritamm taught music at a high school in Märjamaa, and from 1955 until 1961 he taught children at a school in Pärnu.

Uritamm married his wife, Ellen, in 1943. He was a vegetarian. Among his friends was Neeme Järvi, who encouraged him to preserve his music.

During the Soviet occupation, much of Uritamm's work remained unheard for a long time due to political reasons. Since Estonia regained its independence in 1991, however, his work has begun to appear on concert programs. His music has been described as ironic and deriving some of its sonic character from folk music. Little of his work has been recorded, but the piano trio Three Faces of the Homo Sovieticus, written in 1948 (premiered in 2012) was released on compact disc in 2014, and two of his songs were recorded by the baritone Tiit Kuusik in 1976.
