= Lõuka =

Village in Estonia

- village
- Location in Estonia
- Coordinates: 58°20′45″N 24°02′22″E
- Country: Estonia
- County: Pärnu County
- Municipality: Pärnu urban municipality

Population (01.01.2011)
  - Total: 50

Lõuka is a village in Pärnu urban municipality, Pärnu County, in southwestern Estonia. It is located just east of Tõstamaa, the administrative centre of the municipality. Lõuka has a population of 50 (as of 1 January 2011).
