= Ranniku =

Village in Estonia

- village
- Location in Estonia
- Coordinates: 58°20′18″N 23°55′34″E
- Country: Estonia
- County: Pärnu County
- Municipality: Pärnu urban municipality

Population (01.01.2011)
  - Total: 28
- Website: www.kastnaselts.ee

Ranniku is a village in Pärnu urban municipality, Pärnu County, in southwestern Estonia. It is located just west of Tõstamaa, the administrative centre of the municipality, on the coast of Gulf of Riga. It has a population of 28 (as of 1 January 2011).
