= Alexander von Staël-Holstein =

German-Baltic orientalist

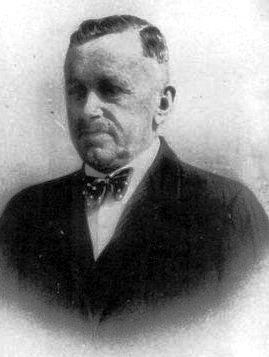
Alexander Stael von Holstein

Alexander Wilhelm Freiherr Staël von Holstein (Chinese: 鋼和泰, 20 December 1876 in Testama manor, Livonia, Russian Empire – 16 March 1937 in Beiping, China) was a Baltic German aristocrat, Russian and Estonian orientalist, sinologist, and Sanskritologist specializing in Buddhist texts.

== Life ==

Related to Germaine de Staël's husband, the future baron was born in the Governorate of Livonia of the Russian Empire (present-day Estonia), in an aristocratic family (with widespread relations in other German Baltic provinces of the Russian Empire, Sweden and Northern Germany) on New Year's Day. He was educated at home during his childhood. When he reached 15, he was sent to a Gymnasium in the town of Pernau (now Pärnu). He pursued his higher education at the Dorpat University (Tartu), where some of his families had studied, majoring in comparative philology. After his graduation, he left for Germany, studying oriental languages in the Berlin University.

Prussian public records of 1898 show that the young Baron was involved in a duel in Berlin, which he apparently survived. In his second year in Berlin, as the only male heir he inherited the family estate in Testama (now Tõstamaa) and the baronage. In 1900, he gained his doctorate with his dissertation Der Karmapradīpa, II. Prapāthaka from the University of Halle-Wittenberg. The first Prapāṭhaka of the Karmapradīpa had been translated in 1889 by Friedrich Schrader, also as a dissertation in Halle. The supervisor of both dissertations was Professor Richard Pischel, at that time the world's leading expert on Prakrit, the ancient form of Sanskrit, and long-time head of the "Deutsche Morgenländische Gesellschaft", the German Orientalist Society.

During the following years, Baron de Stael traveled widely and studied with the best oriental scholars in Germany, England and India.

He started his academic career in 1909 when he was appointed assistant professor of Sanskrit in the University of St. Petersburg and the member of the Russian Committee for the Exploration of Central and Eastern Asia. In 1912, he visited the US and lived in Harvard for some time to study Sanskrit.

He was in the Republic of China when the October Revolution broke out. The government of the new Estonian Republic, established in 1918 after the Treaty of Versailles, left him only a small part of his inherited estate. He then accepted an Estonian citizenship but remained in Beijing. With the recommendation of his friend Charles Eliot, the then principal of the University of Hong Kong, he was invited by Hu Shih to teach Sanskrit, Tibetan, and the History of Indian Religion at Peking University as lecturer from 1918 to 1921 and as professor from 1922 to 1929. He helped set up the Sino-Indian Institute in Beijing in 1927. In 1928 he was a visiting scholar at Harvard University, helping the Harvard-Yenching Institute to collect books. In 1932, he was selected an Honorary Fellow of the Institute of History and Philology (歷史語言研究所), Academia Sinica.

Besides his works on Indian and Tibetan religions, he also contributed to the field of historical Chinese phonology. His influential "The Phonetic Transcription of Sanskrit Works and Ancient Chinese Pronunciation" was translated by Hu Shih into Chinese and was published in Guoxue Jikan (Chinese: 國學季刊) in 1923.

== Descendants ==
Wilhelm Freiherr Staël von Holstein

== Selected works ==
- The Kāçyapaparivarta: a Mahāyānasūtra of the Ratnakūṭa class, edited in the original Sanskrit, in Tibetan and in Chinese, Shanghai: Shangwu Yinshuguan, 1926
- On a Tibetan text translated into Sanskrit under Ch'ien Lung (XIII cent.) and into Chinese under Tao Kuang (XIX cent.), Bulletin of the National Library of Peiping, 1932
- On two Tibetan pictures representing some of the spiritual ancestors of the Dalai Lama and of the Panchen Lama, Bulletin of the National Library of Peiping, 1932
- A commentary to the Kāçcyapaparivarta, edited in Tibetan and in Chinese, Peking: published jointly by the National Library and the National Tsinghau University, 1933
- On a Peking edition of the Tibetan kanjur which seems to be unknown in the West, Peking: Lazarist Press, 1934
- On two recent reconstructions of a Sanskrit hymn transliterated with Chinese characters in the X century A.D, Peking: Lazarist Press, 1934
- Two Lamaistic pantheons, edited with introduction and indexes by Walter Eugene Clark from materials collected by the late Baron A. von Staël-Holstein, Harvard-Yenching Institute monograph series 3 and 4, Cambridge, Mass.: Harvard University Press, 1937

== See also ==
- List of Baltic German scientists

== Sources ==
- Elisseeff, Serge (1938). "Staël-Holstein's Contribution to Asiatic Studies". Harvard Journal of Asiatic Studies. 3 (1): 1–8. doi:10.2307/2717970. JSTOR 2717970.
