= Tõhela =

Village in Estonia

- village
- Location in Estonia
- Coordinates: 58°26′51″N 24°00′07″E
- Country: Estonia
- County: Pärnu County
- Municipality: Pärnu municipality
- First mentioned: 1518

Population (01.01.2011)
  - Total: 51
- Website: www.tohela.ee

Tõhela is a village in Pärnu municipality, Pärnu County, in southwestern Estonia. It has a population of 51 (as of 1 January 2011).

Tõhela was first mentioned in 1518 as Toegel and Toigel. But the place itself has been inhabited earlier before, as prove the gravesites from the beginning of the 2nd millennium.

Tõhela St. John the Baptist Church, Tõhela Library and Lake Tõhela are all located south, in the neighbouring Männikuste village.
