= Tõlli, Pärnu County =

Village in Estonia

Tõlli
- village
- Location in Estonia
- Coordinates: 58°18′34″N 24°01′24″E
- Country: Estonia
- County: Pärnu County
- Municipality: Pärnu municipality

Population (01.01.2011)
  - Total: 44

Tõlli is a village in Pärnu municipality, Pärnu County, in southwestern Estonia. It is located just southeast of Tõstamaa, the administrative centre of the municipality, on the coast of the Gulf of Riga. Tõlli has a population of 44 (as of 1 January 2011).

Tõrvanõmme pine, one of the fattest trees in Estonia, is located in Tõlli village.

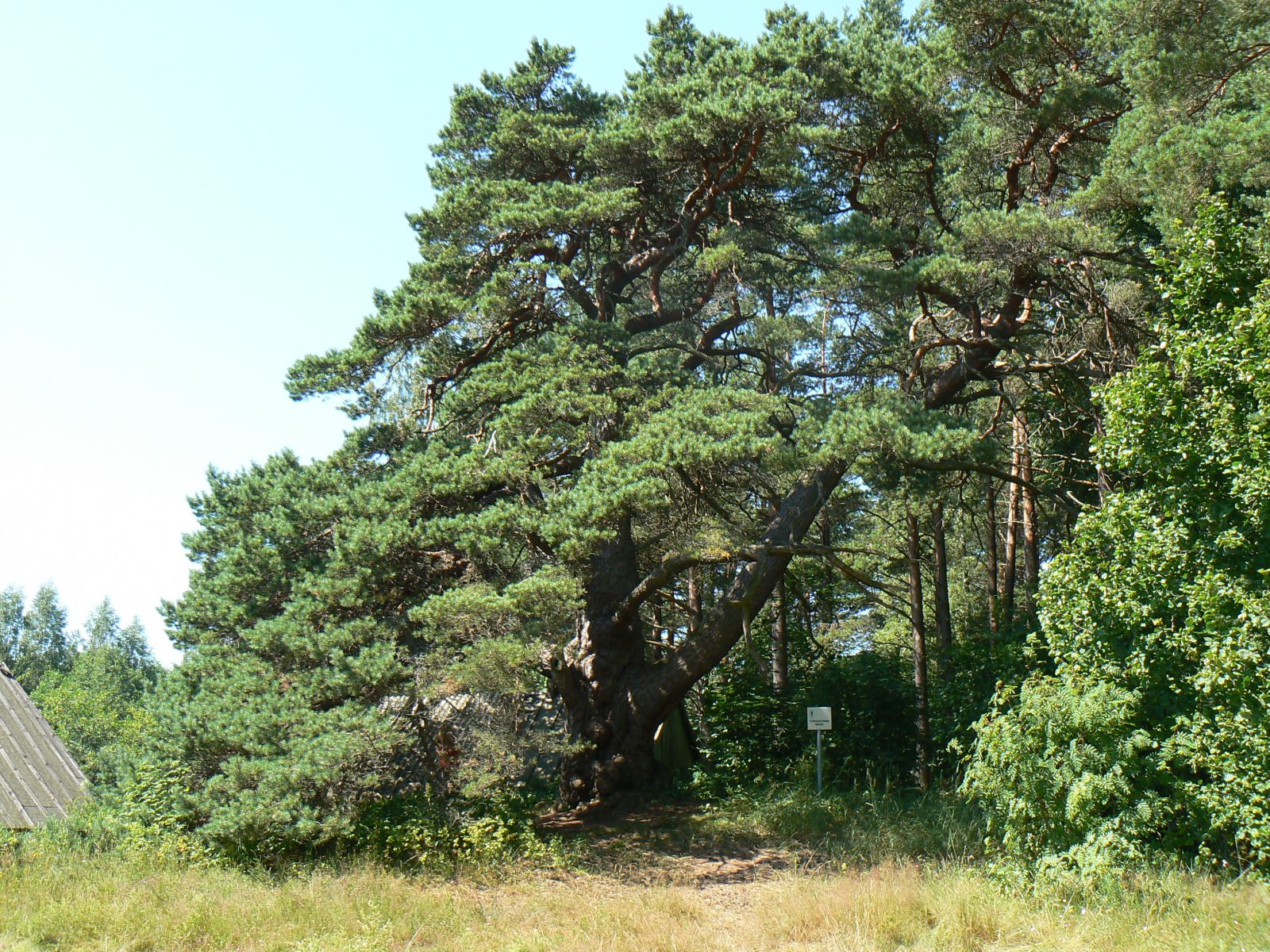
Tõrvanõmme pine

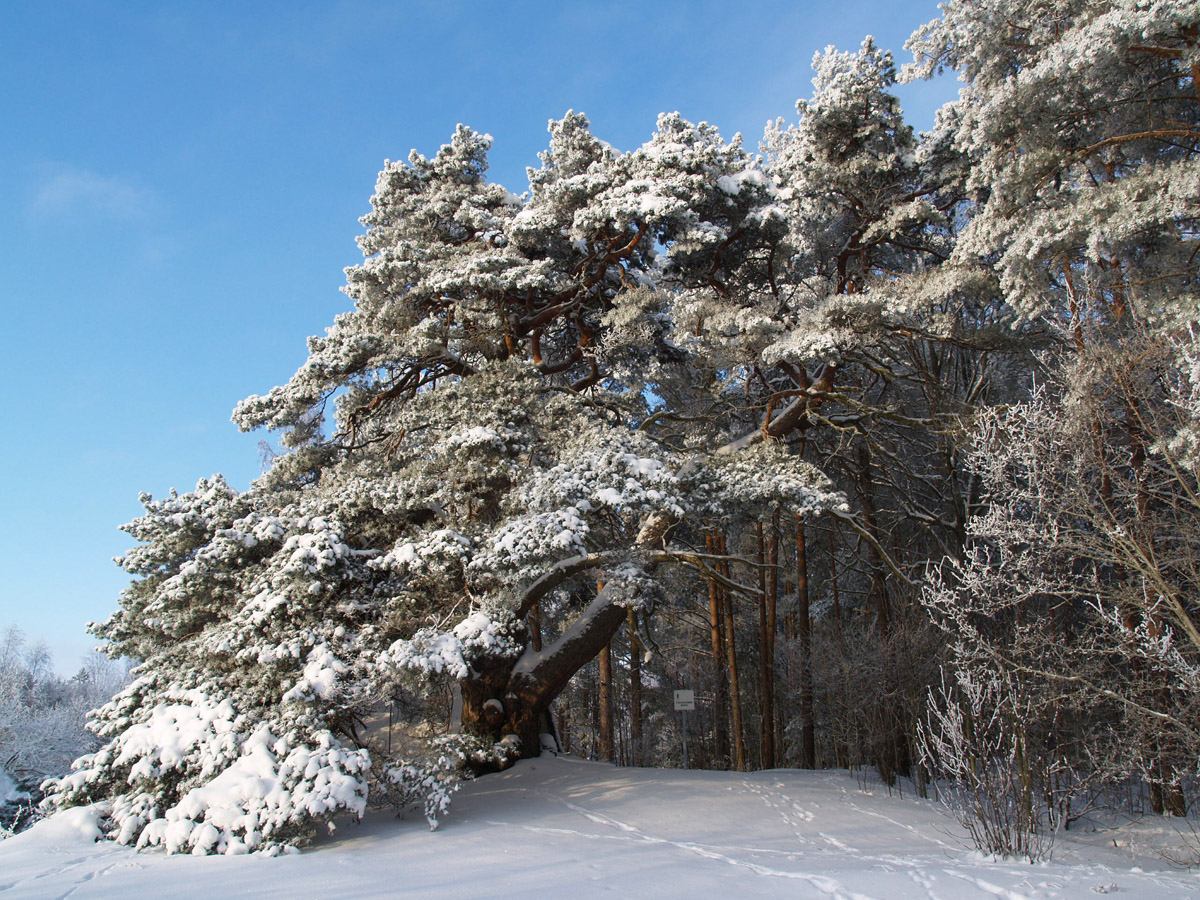
Tõrvanõmme pine in winter
