= Lake Ermistu =

Lake in Estonia

- Ermistu järv (Estonian)
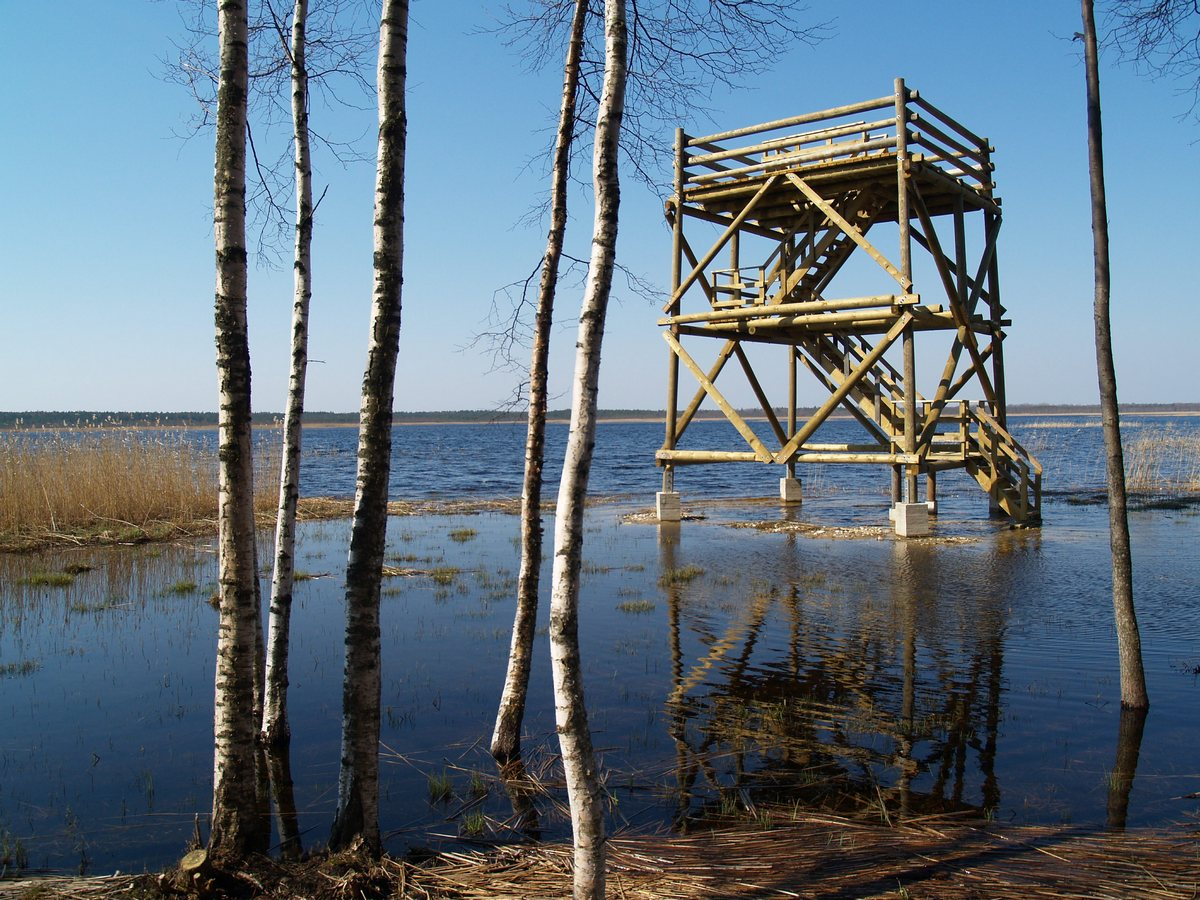
- A watch tower on the shore of Lake Ermistu

- Location within Estonia
- Location: Ermistu, Pärnu, Pärnu County, Estonia
- Coordinates: 58°22′N 23°58.5′E
- Lake type: Eutrophic
- Primary outflows: Tõstamaa River
- Catchment area: 32.3 km^{2} (12.5 sq mi; 8,000 acres)
- Basin countries: Estonia
- Max. length: 4,100 meters (13,500 ft)
- Max. width: 1,750 meters (5,740 ft)
- Surface area: 452.4 hectares (1,118 acres)
- Average depth: 1.9 meters (6 ft 3 in)
- Max. depth: 3.0 meters (9.8 ft)
- Water volume: 8,929,000 cubic meters (315,300,000 cu ft)
- Shore length^{1}: 22,340 meters (73,290 ft)
- Surface elevation: 17.9 meters (59 ft)
- Islands: 12
- ^{1} Shore length is not a well-defined measure.

Lake Ermistu (Estonian: Ermistu järv; also known as Mõisajärv, Ärmistu järv, Härmesi järv, Tõstamaa järv, or Mõisa järv) is a lake in southwestern Estonia. It is mostly located in the village of Ermistu in the municipality of Pärnu, Pärnu County, with part of a small bay extending into neighboring Ranniku and Rammuka.

== Physical description ==
The lake has an area of 452.4 hectares (1,118 acres), and it has 12 islands with a combined area of 4.3 hectares (11 acres). The lake has an average depth of 1.9 meters (6 ft 3 in) and a maximum depth of 3.0 meters (9.8 ft). It is 4,100 meters (13,500 ft) long, and its shoreline measures 22,340 meters (73,290 ft). It has a volume of 8,929,000 cubic meters (315,300,000 cu ft).

== See also ==
- List of lakes of Estonia
- Lake Tõhela, another lake nearby
