= Seliste =

Village in Estonia

- village
- Location in Estonia
- Coordinates: 58°16′35″N 24°05′05″E
- Country: Estonia
- County: Pärnu County
- Municipality: Pärnu municipality
- First mentioned: 1560

Population (01.01.2011)
  - Total: 157
- Website: selisteselts.onepagefree.com

Seliste (German: Sellie) is a village in Pärnu municipality, Pärnu County, in southwestern Estonia. It's located on the southwestern side of Tõstamaa Peninsula on the coast of Gulf of Riga. Seliste has a population of 157 (as of 1 January 2011).

Seliste was first mentioned in 1560 as Sellingel.

== Gallery ==
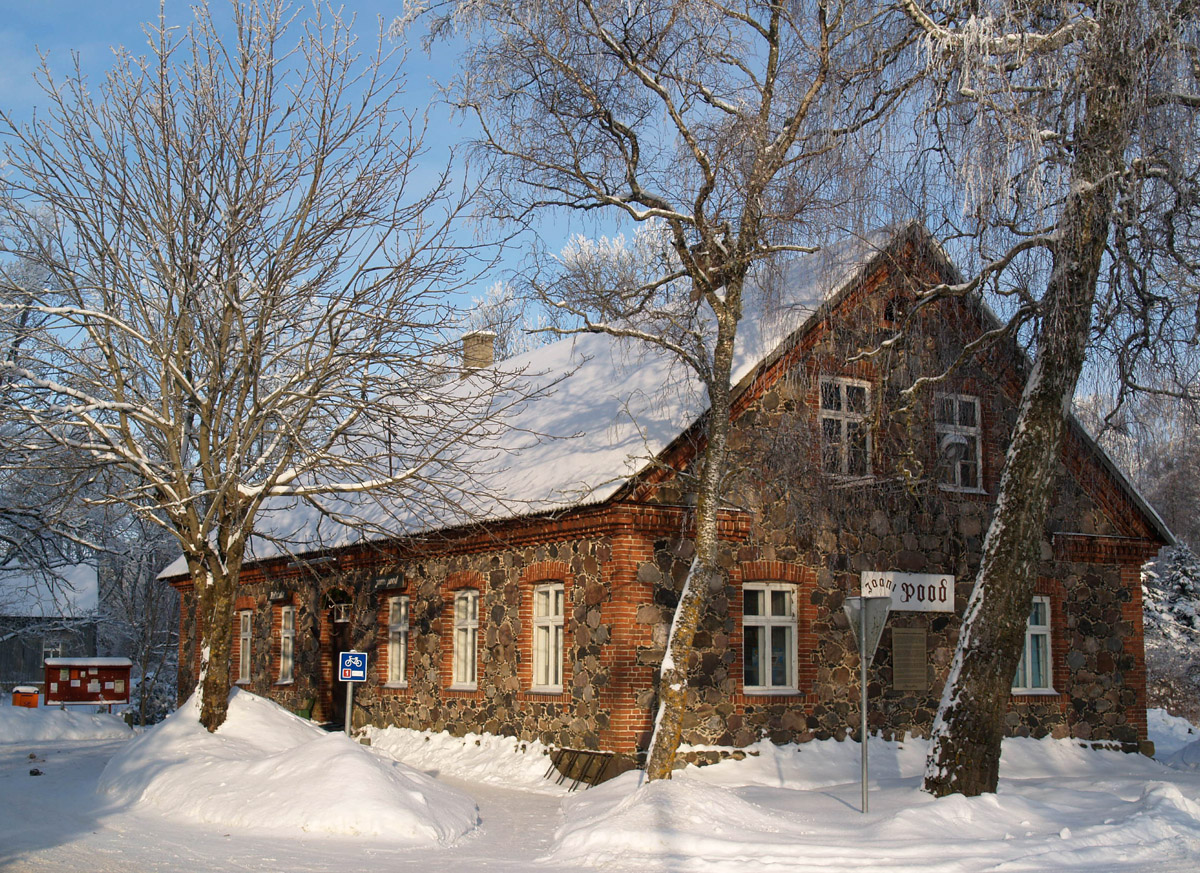
Seliste store

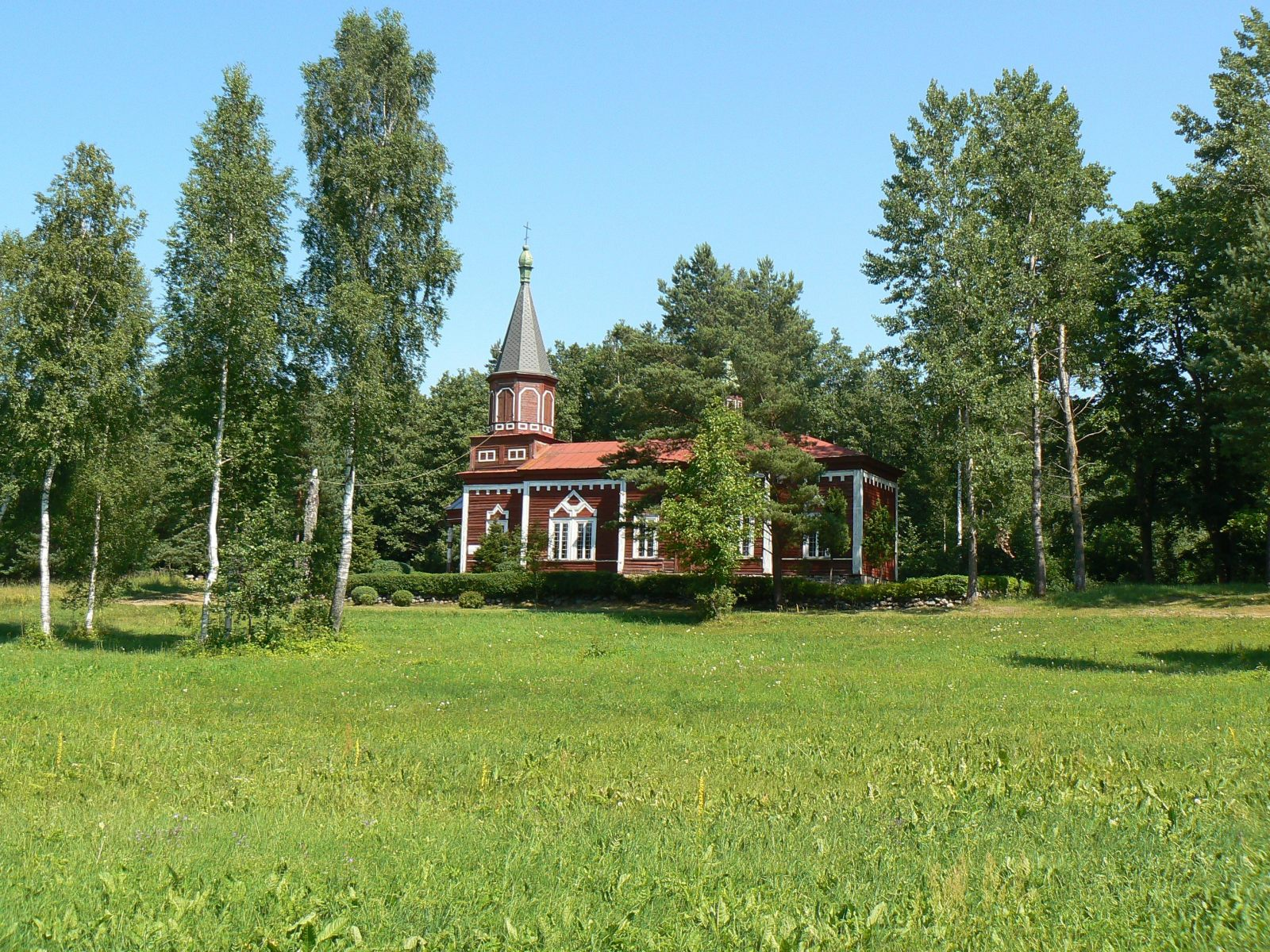
Seliste St. Basil's Orthodox church

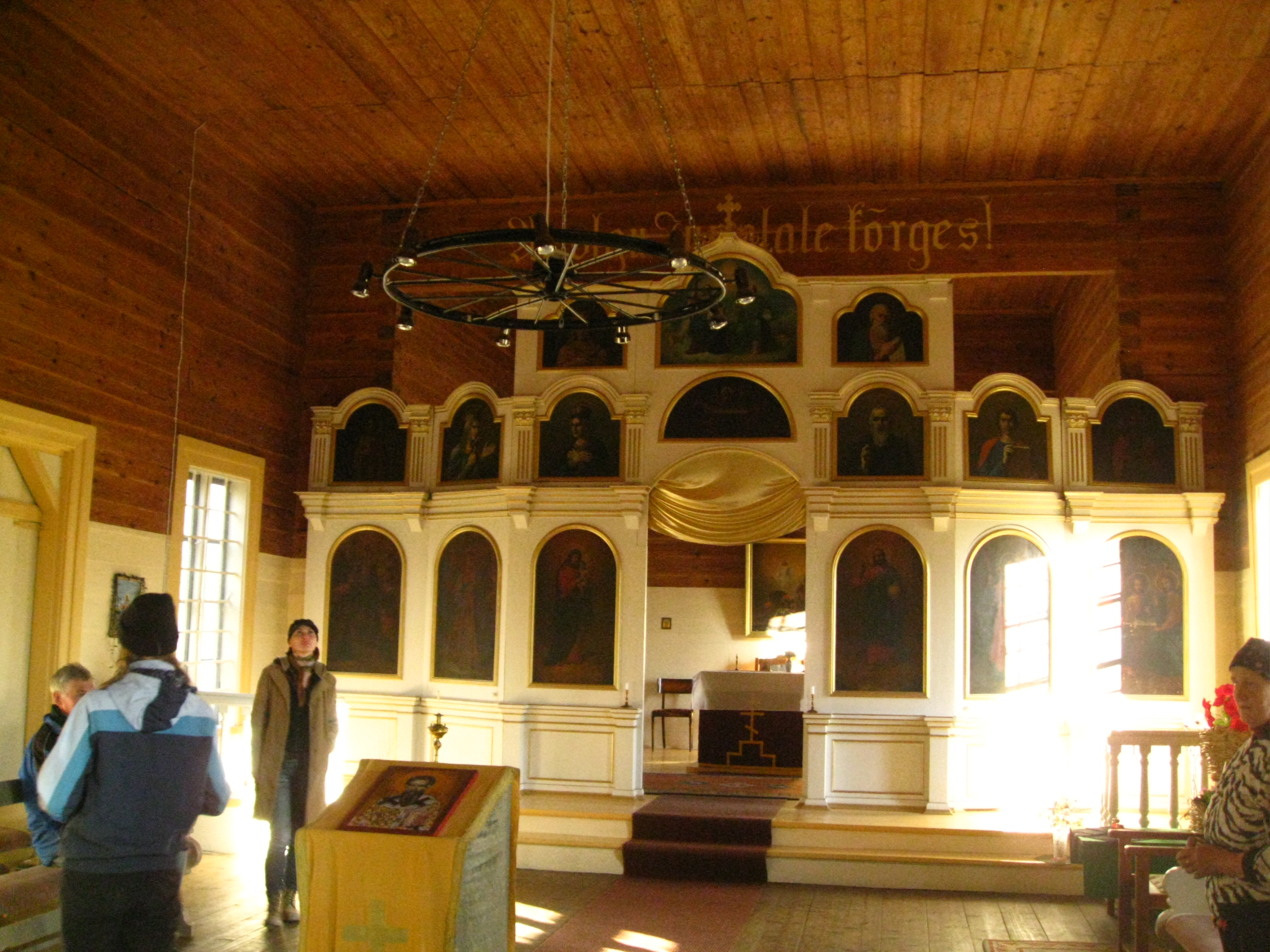
Church interior
