= Tõstamaa Secondary School =

School in Estonia

Coordinates: 58.3381541°N 23.9947414°E

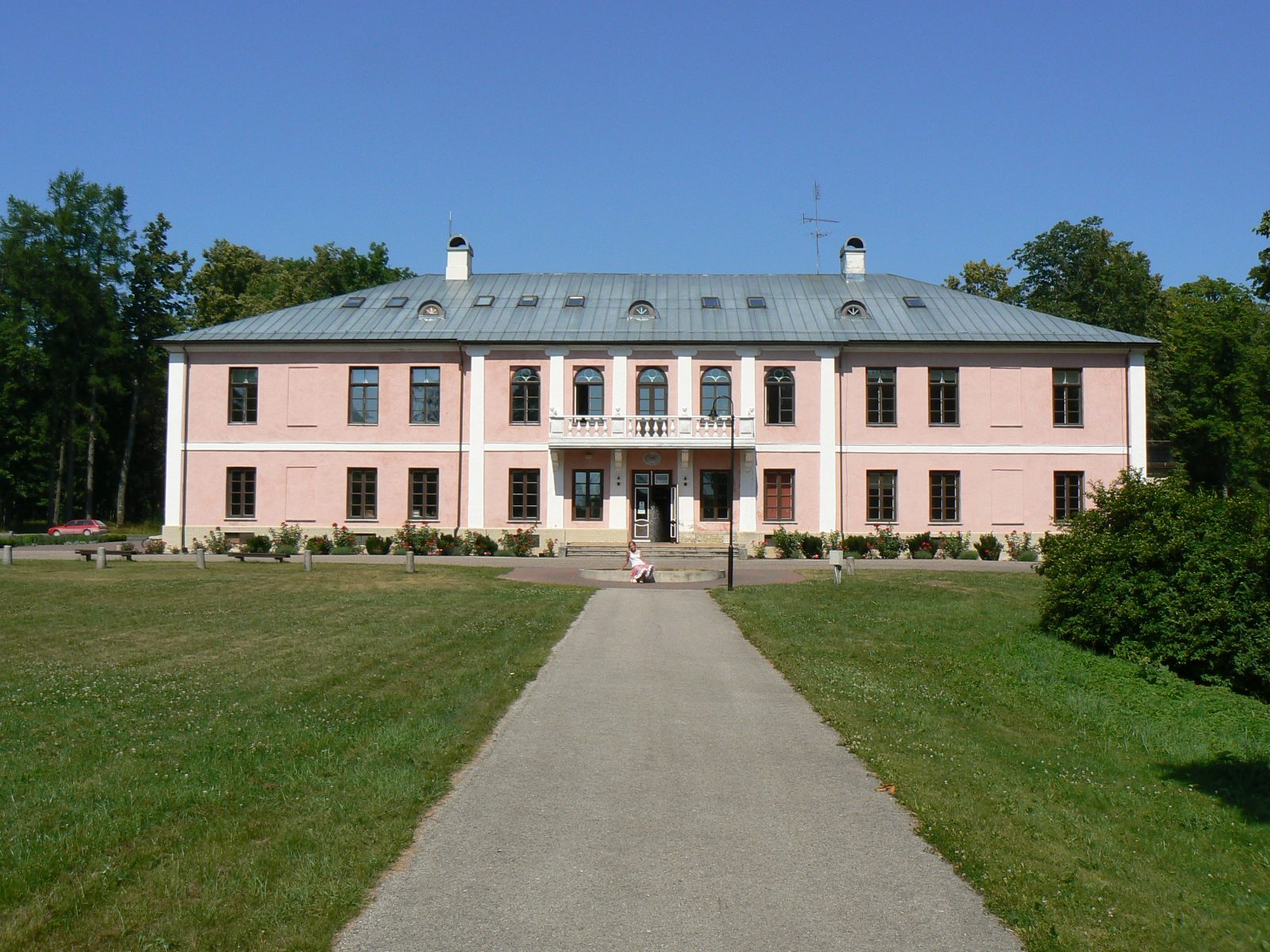

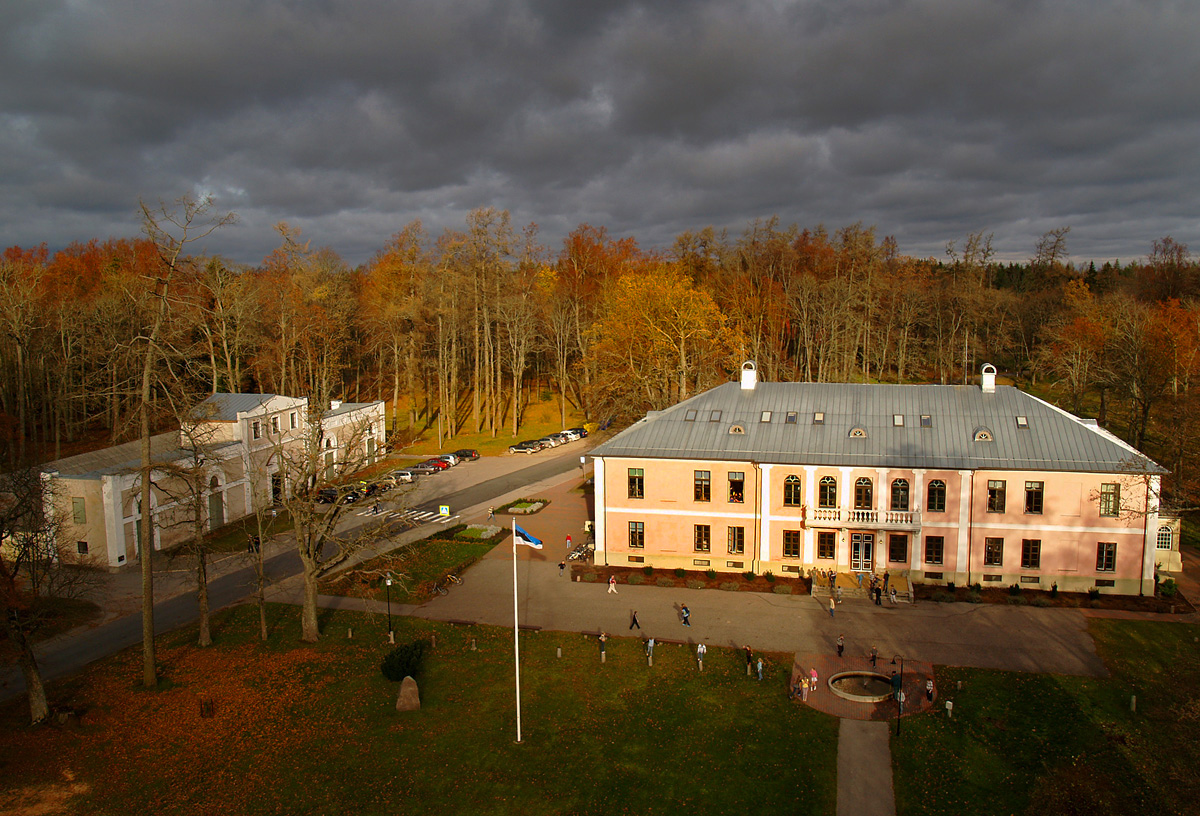

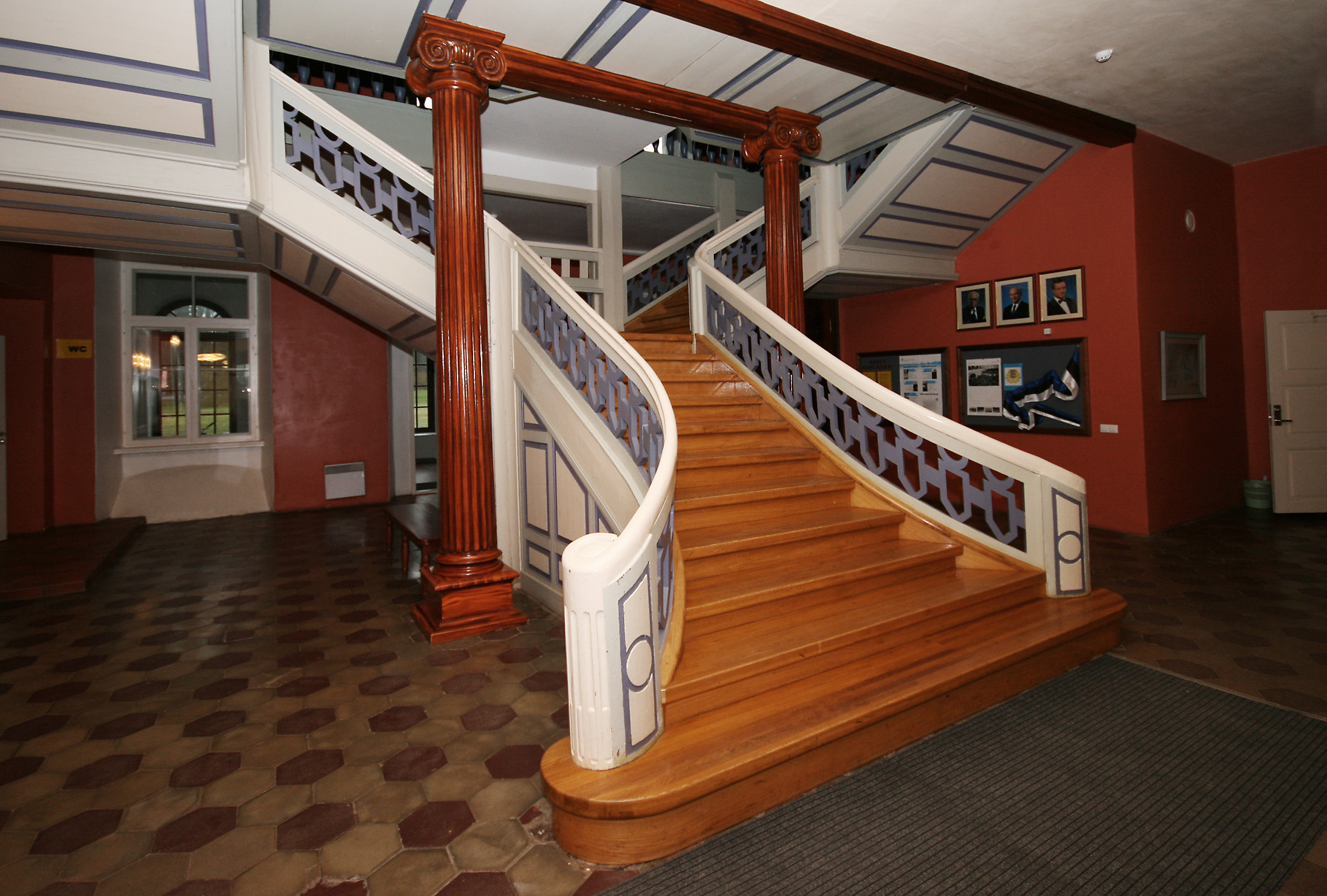

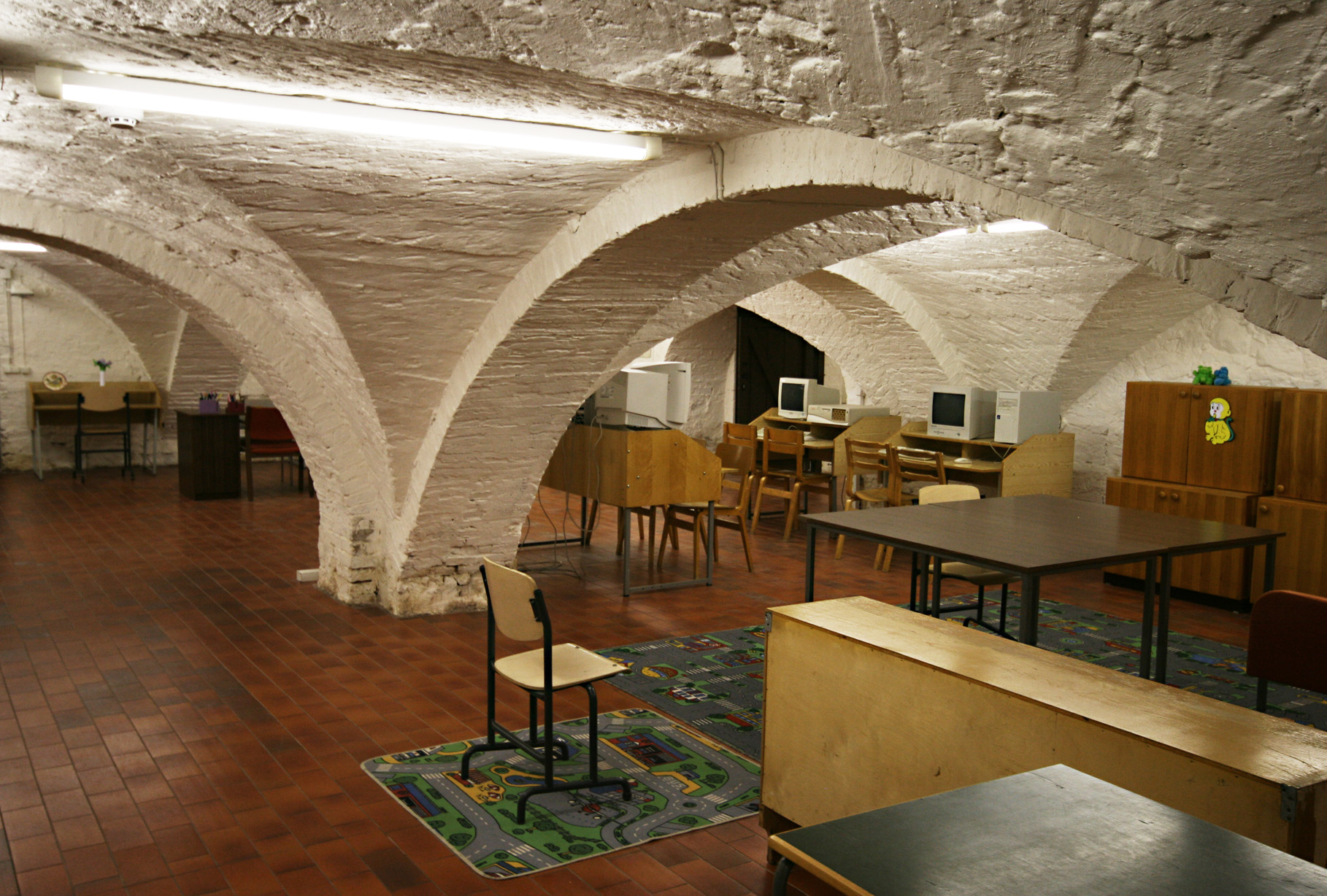

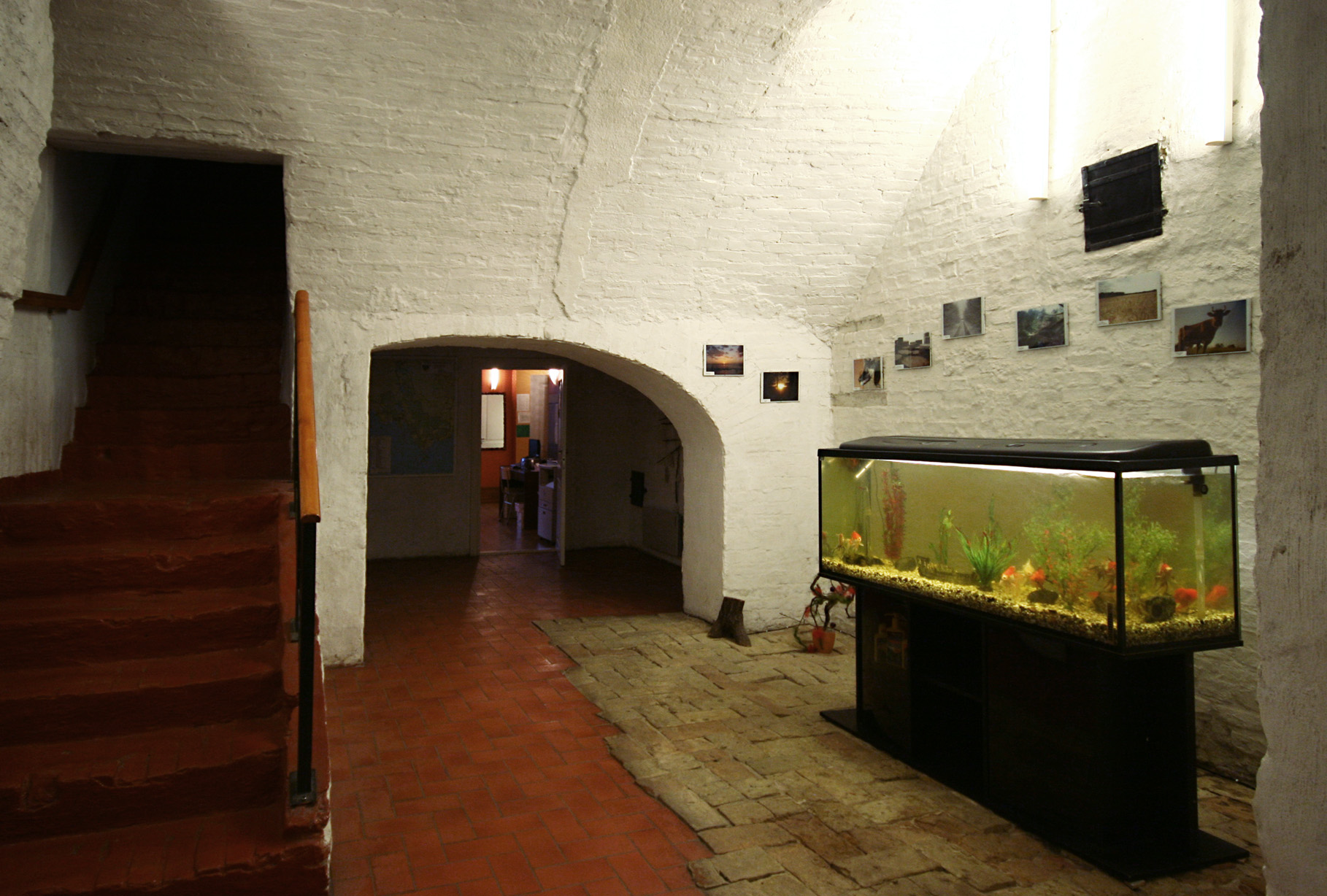

Tõstamaa Secondary School (Estonian: Tõstamaa Keskkool) is a secondary school in Tõstamaa, Estonia. It is located in a manor house since the 1921–22 academic year. The children of Tõstamaa have been schooled for more than three centuries.

Today, the school has a faculty of about twenty-five, who teach about 260 students in the primary and secondary classrooms.
