= Tiit Kuusik =

Estonian opera singer and pedagogue (1911–1990)

- Born: Dietrich Kuusik; 24 September 1911; Pärnu, Governorate of Livonia, Russian Empire
- Died: 15 August 1990 (aged 78); Tallinn, Estonian SSR, Soviet Union
- Other name: Dietrich Kuusik
- Occupations: Opera singer; voice teacher
- Years active: 1938–1988
- Employer: Tallinn Conservatory
- Organizations: Vienna Volksoper; Staatstheater Kassel; Estonia Theatre
- Awards: Honored Artist of the Estonian SSR (1945); Two Stalin Prizes (1950, 1952); People's Artist of the USSR (1954); Order of Lenin (1956); Order of the Badge of Honour (1965); Order of the Red Banner of Labour (1971); Order of Friendship of Peoples (1981); Order of the October Revolution (1986)

Tiit Kuusik (born Dietrich Kuusik; 24 September 1911 – 15 August 1990) was an Estonian operatic baritone and vocal pedagogue. Regarded as one of the preeminent dramatic baritones in Estonian vocal history, he was the principal soloist at the Estonia Theatre for more than four decades and taught as a professor at the Tallinn State Conservatory.

== Early life and education ==
Kuusik was born in Pärnu, then part of the Governorate of Livonia in the Russian Empire. His father was a joiner. While attending the Pärnu Boys' Gymnasium, he performed as a violinist, cellist, and percussionist in the student dance orchestra, while singing tenor and later bass in the school choir under Heinrich Meri.

Following his gymnasium graduation in 1930, he took private vocal instruction from Elene Rebas. He entered the Tallinn Conservatory, studying under Aleksander Arder, and graduated in 1938. His graduation performance was the role of Silvio in Ruggero Leoncavallo's Pagliacci.

== Career ==
In June 1938, Kuusik won first prize at the International Singing Competition in Vienna, performing Figaro's cavatina "Largo al factotum" from Rossini's The Barber of Seville, which subsequently became his signature concert piece. The competition win secured him a contract as a soloist at the Vienna Volksoper for the 1938–1939 season.

Kuusik returned to Estonia in 1940 to join the ensemble of the Estonia Theatre. During the German occupation, he performed with the Staatstheater Kassel in Germany between 1942 and 1943. In 1944, he resumed his post at the Estonia Theatre, where he remained the principal baritone until his retirement from the stage in 1988. He also appeared frequently as a soloist with the Estonian State Academic Male Choir (RAM).

Known for his dramatic volume, resonant lower register, and vocal stamina, Kuusik maintained an active performance schedule into his seventies, appearing in guest engagements at the Bolshoi Theatre in Moscow, the Royal Swedish Opera in Stockholm, and concert halls throughout Eastern Europe.

In addition to his stage career, Kuusik began teaching voice at the Tallinn State Conservatory in 1940. Appointed professor in 1947, he trained a generation of prominent Estonian singers, including Georg Ots, Aino Külvand, Teo Maiste, and Raimond Alango.

== Repertoire ==
Kuusik performed 46 opera roles and one operetta role during his career, encompassing Italian verismo, French grand opera, Russian romanticism, and 20th-century Estonian national works.

=== Opera roles ===
- Silvio and Tonio (Leoncavallo, Pagliacci)
- Escamillo (Bizet, Carmen)
- Figaro (Rossini, The Barber of Seville)
- Title role (Verdi, Rigoletto)
- Renato (Verdi, Un ballo in maschera)
- Giorgio Germont (Verdi, La traviata)
- Amonasro (Verdi, Aida)
- Iago (Verdi, Otello)
- Baron Scarpia (Puccini, Tosca)
- Sharpless (Puccini, Madama Butterfly)
- Title role (Tchaikovsky, Eugene Onegin)
- Prince Igor (Borodin, Prince Igor)
- Title role (Mussorgsky, Boris Godunov)
- Title role (Rubinstein, The Demon)
- Ruslan (Glinka, Ruslan and Lyudmila)
- Wotan (Wagner, Die Walküre)
- The Dutchman (Wagner, The Flying Dutchman)
- Count Ungru (Ernesaks, Tormide rand)
- Title role (V. Kapp, Lembitu)

=== Concert and oratorio ===
Kuusik was also an active recitalist and lieder interpreter, frequently collaborating with accompanists Valdur Roots and Peep Lassmann. His recital repertoire included Franz Schubert's song cycle Winterreise as well as works by Robert Schumann, Edvard Grieg, and Mart Saar. He was a featured soloist in major cantatas and oratorios, including Beethoven's Symphony No. 9, Haydn's The Creation, Orff's Carmina Burana, and Eino Tamberg's Moonlight Oratorio.

== Filmography and recordings ==
- Kui saabub õhtu (1955, Tallinnfilm) – featured appearance
- Tiit Kuusik vene ooperis (1970, Eesti Telefilm)
- Laulab Tiit Kuusik (1973, Tallinnfilm; directed by Virve Aruoja)
- Maestro Tiit Kuusik "Estonia" teatris (1979, Eesti Telefilm; directed by Arne Mikk)
- Puritaanlased (1984, Eesti Telefilm)

Kuusik's audio recordings were released primarily by the Soviet state label Melodiya, comprising complete opera sets, solo operatic recitals, and collections of Estonian vocal music.

== Awards and honors ==
- Honored Artist of the Estonian SSR (1945)
- Soviet Estonian Prize (1949, 1959, 1967)
- Two Stalin Prizes (2nd class, 1950 and 1952)
- People's Artist of the Estonian SSR (1952)
- People's Artist of the USSR (1954)
- Order of Lenin (1956)
- Order of the Badge of Honour (1965)
- Order of the Red Banner of Labour (1971)
- Order of Friendship of Peoples (1981)
- Order of the October Revolution (1986)

== Legacy ==
In 1994, the Estonia Society established the Tiit Kuusik International Lied Competition (Estonian: Tiit Kuusiku nimeline lauluvõistlus), dedicated to classical art song and works by Estonian composers. In 2006, the Estonian National Culture Foundation set up the Tiit Kuusik Scholarship within the Estonia Society Sub-fund to support emerging opera singers. In 1995, his son Kaido Kuusik donated the singer's personal archives, diaries, scores, and correspondence to the National Library of Estonia.
