= Rammuka, Pärnu County =

Village in Estonia

Rammuka
- village
- Location in Estonia
- Coordinates: 58°22′18″N 23°53′08″E
- Country: Estonia
- County: Pärnu County
- Municipality: Pärnu urban municipality

Population (01.01.2011)
  - Total: 29
- Website: www.kastnaselts.ee

Rammuka is a village in Pärnu urban municipality, Pärnu County, in southwestern Estonia. It has a population of 29 (as of 1 January 2011).

Rammuka is bordered by Lake Ermistu to the east and Lake Tõhela to the northeast, Tõhela bog is located between the lakes.
