= Lake Tõhela =

Lake in Estonia

- Tõhela järv (Estonian)
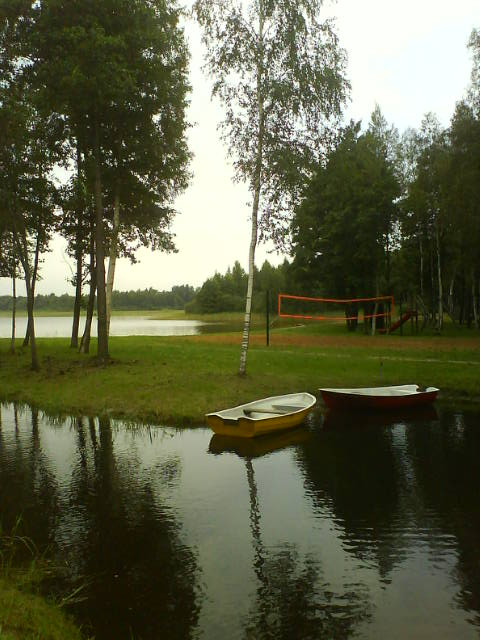

- Location within Estonia
- Location: Tõhela, Pärnu, Pärnu County, Estonia
- Coordinates: 58°25′N 23°59.5′E
- Type: Eutrophic
- Primary outflows: Paadrema River
- Catchment area: 21.7 km^{2} (8.4 sq mi; 5,400 acres)
- Basin countries: Estonia
- Max. length: 2,760 meters (9,060 ft)
- Max. width: 1,850 meters (6,070 ft)
- Surface area: 320.4 hectares (792 acres)
- Average depth: 1.0 meter (3 ft 3 in)
- Max. depth: 1.9 meters (6 ft 3 in)
- Water volume: 3,114,000 cubic meters (110,000,000 cu ft)
- Shore length^{1}: 14,690 meters (48,200 ft)
- Surface elevation: 16.9 meters (55 ft)
- Islands: 5
- ^{1} Shore length is not a well-defined measure.

Lake Tõhela (Estonian: Tõhela järv) is a lake in southwestern Estonia. It is located in the village of Männikuste in the urban municipality of Pärnu, Pärnu County.

== Physical description ==
The lake has an area of 320.4 hectares (792 acres), and it has five islands with a combined area of 2.4 hectares (5.9 acres). The lake has an average depth of 1.0 meter (3 ft 3 in) and a maximum depth of 1.9 meters (6 ft 3 in). It is 2,760 meters (9,060 ft) long, and its shoreline measures 14,690 meters (48,200 ft). It has a volume of 3,114,000 cubic meters (110,000,000 cu ft).

== See also ==
- List of lakes of Estonia
- Lake Ermistu, another lake nearby
