= Peerni =

Village in Estonia

- village
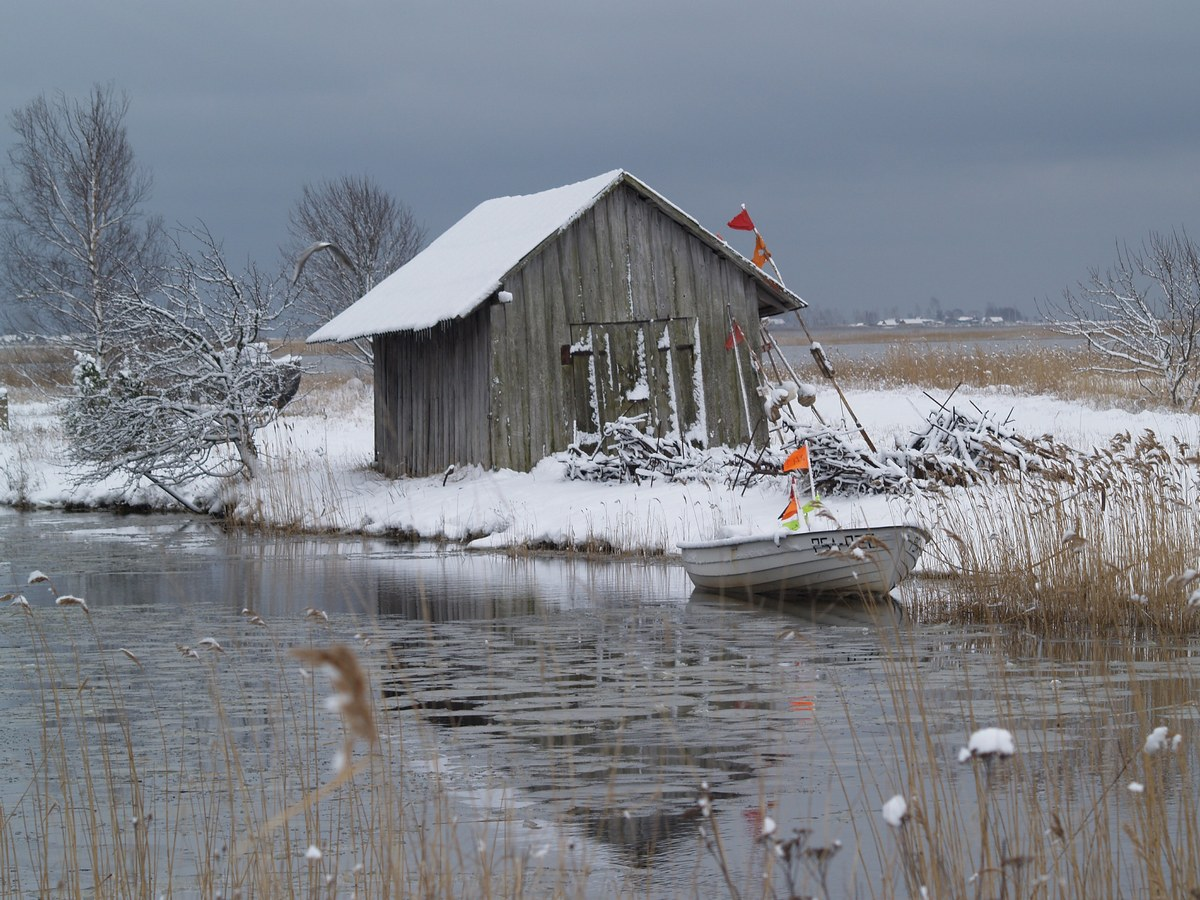
- Peerni harbour

- Location in Estonia
- Coordinates: 58°15′16″N 24°07′56″E
- Country: Estonia
- County: Pärnu County
- Municipality: Pärnu urban municipality

Population (01.01.2011)
  - Total: 22

Peerni is a village in Pärnu urban municipality, Pärnu County, in southwestern Estonia, on the coast of the Gulf of Riga. It has a population of 22 (as of 1 January 2011).

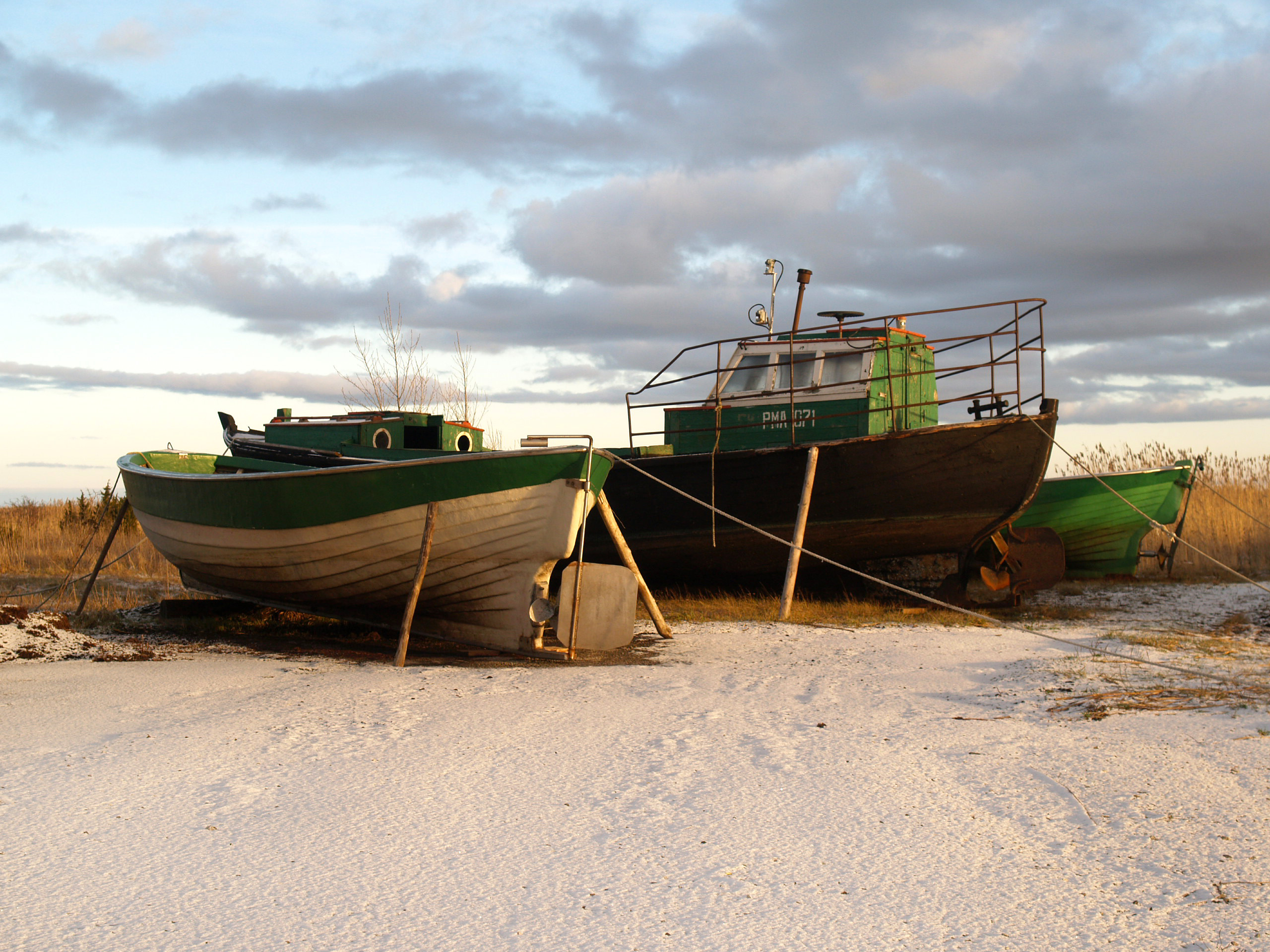
Boats in Peerni harbour
