= Ermistu =

Village in Estonia

- village
- Location in Estonia
- Coordinates: 58°22′18″N 24°01′00″E
- Country: Estonia
- County: Pärnu County
- Municipality: Pärnu urban municipality

Population (01.01.2011)
  - Total: 55

Ermistu is a village in Pärnu urban municipality, Pärnu County, in southwestern Estonia. It has a population of 55 (as of 1 January 2011).

Lake Ermistu is located on the western side of the village.

== Gallery ==
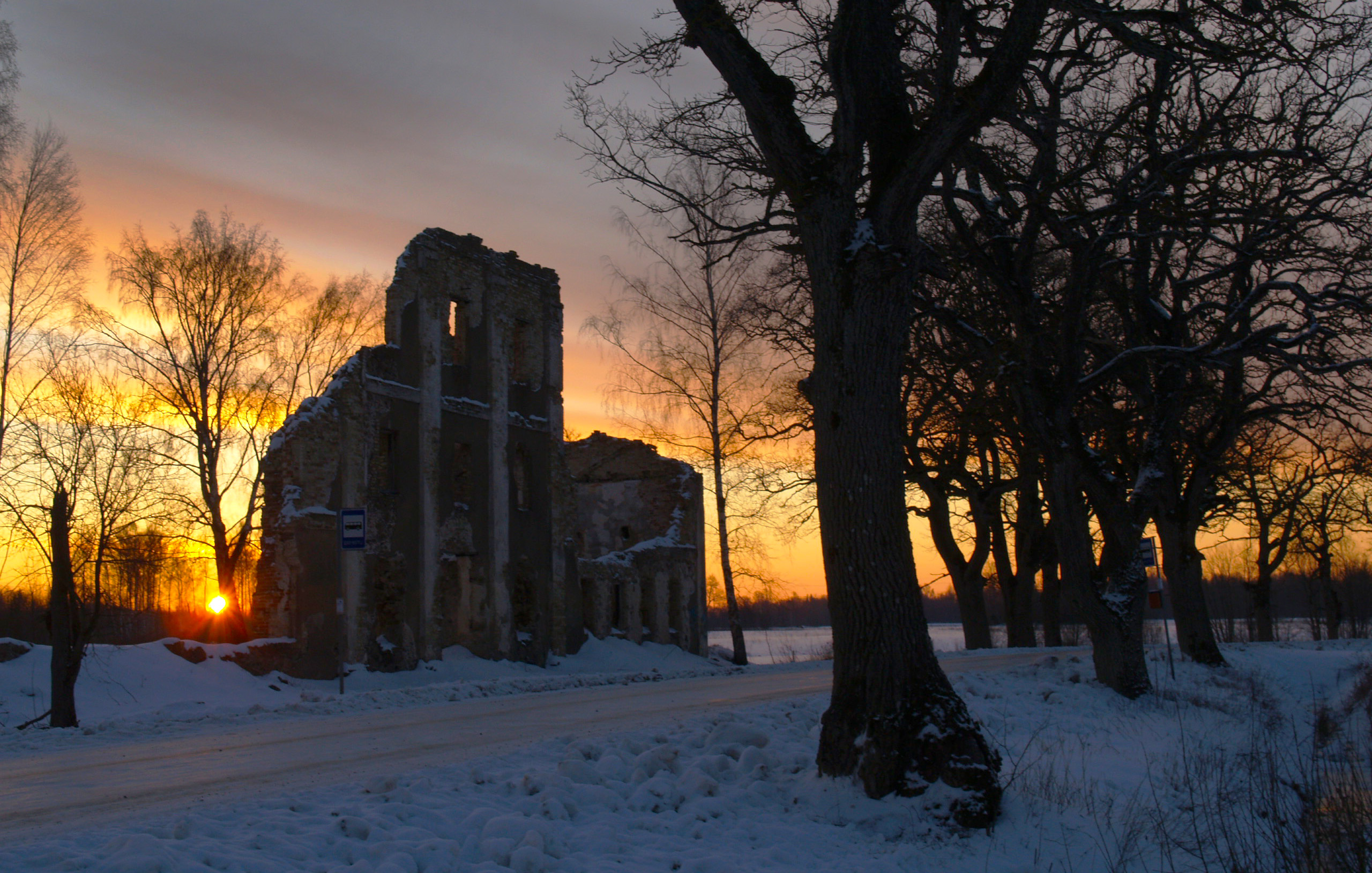

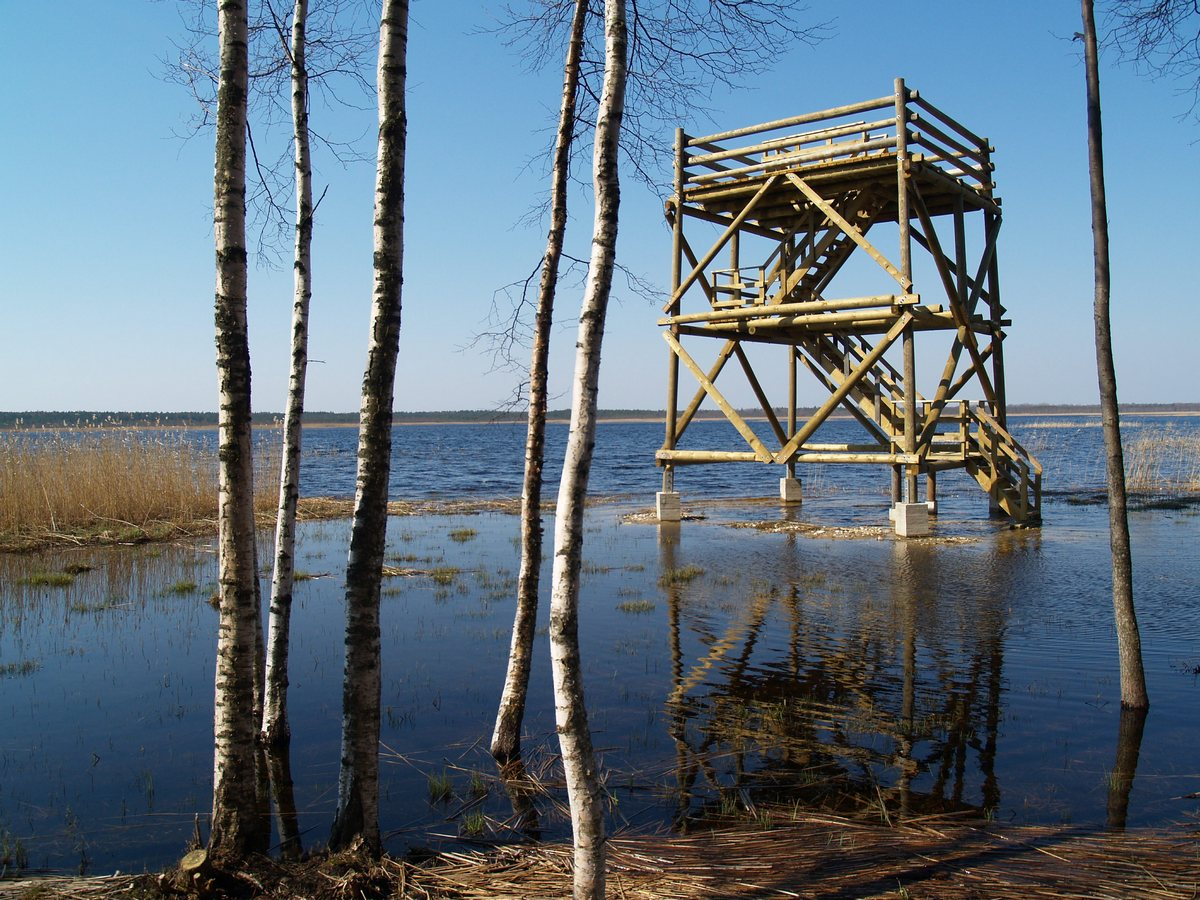
Lake Ermistu
