= Männikuste =

Village in Estonia

- village
- Location in Estonia
- Coordinates: 58°26′06″N 24°00′23″E
- Country: Estonia
- County: Pärnu County
- Municipality: Pärnu urban municipality

Population (01.01.2011)
  - Total: 103
- Website: www.tohela.ee

Männikuste is a village in Pärnu urban municipality, Pärnu County, in southwestern Estonia. It has a population of 103 (as of 1 January 2011).

Lake Tõhela is located on the western side of the village.
