= Tõstamaa =

Borough in Estonia

- Small borough
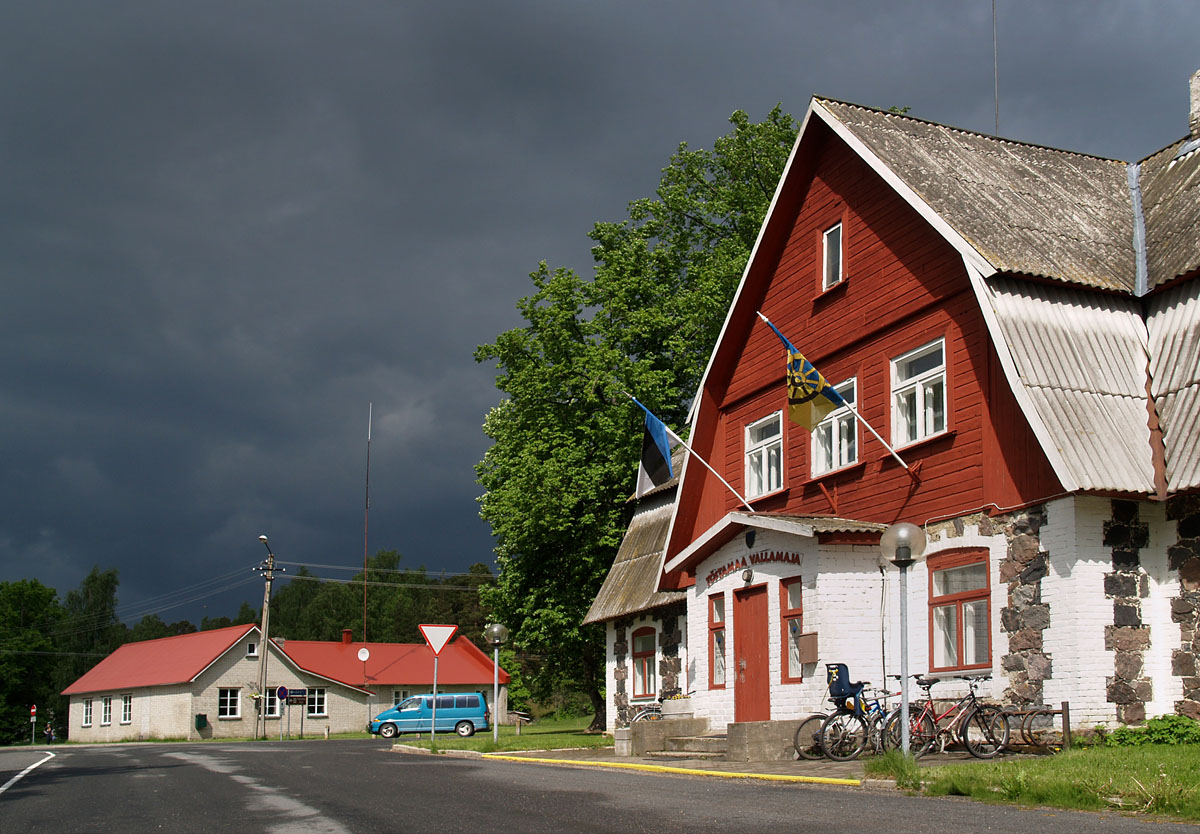
- Local government of Tõstamaa Parish

- Location in Estonia
- Coordinates: 58°20′8″N 23°59′32″E
- Country: Estonia
- County: Pärnu County
- Municipality: Pärnu
- First mentioned: 1553

Population (1.01.2020)
  - Total: 466

Tõstamaa is a small borough (Estonian: alevik) in Pärnu municipality, Pärnu County, southwestern Estonia. Tõstamaa has a population of 466 (as of 1 January 2020).

St. Mary's Lutheran Church in Tõstamaa was built in 1763–1768.

== Tõstamaa Manor ==
Tõstamaa Manor (German: Testama) was first mentioned in 1553 as Testama, when it belonged to the Bishop of Ösel–Wiek. Later the owners have been the Kursells, Helmersens and Staël von Holsteins. The Early-Classical two-storey main building was built in 1804. During a renovation in 1997, several original painted ceilings were uncovered. The manor was dispossessed in 1919 and since 1921 a local school (Tõstamaa Keskkool) is operating in the main building. The best-known resident of the manor is the orientalist Alexander von Staël-Holstein, who grew up and spent his childhood at the manor.

== Notable people ==
- Ellinor Aiki (1893–1969), painter, born in Tõstamaa
- Urmas Eero Liiv (born 1966), film director, born in Tõstamaa
- Alexander von Staël-Holstein (1877–1937), orientalist, born in Tõstamaa
- Artur Uritamm (1901–1982), composer, born in Tõstamaa

== Gallery ==
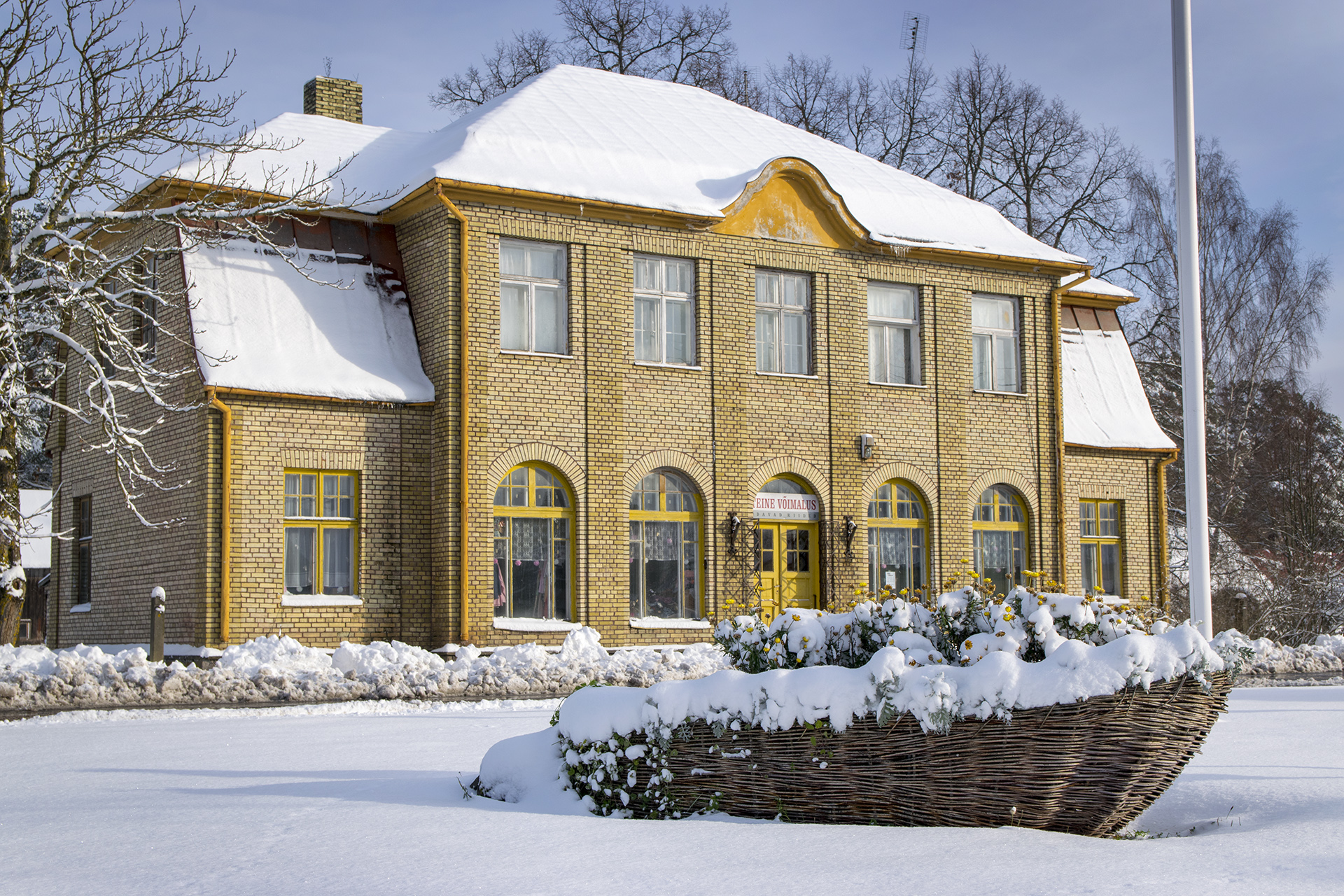
Central square in Tõstamaa

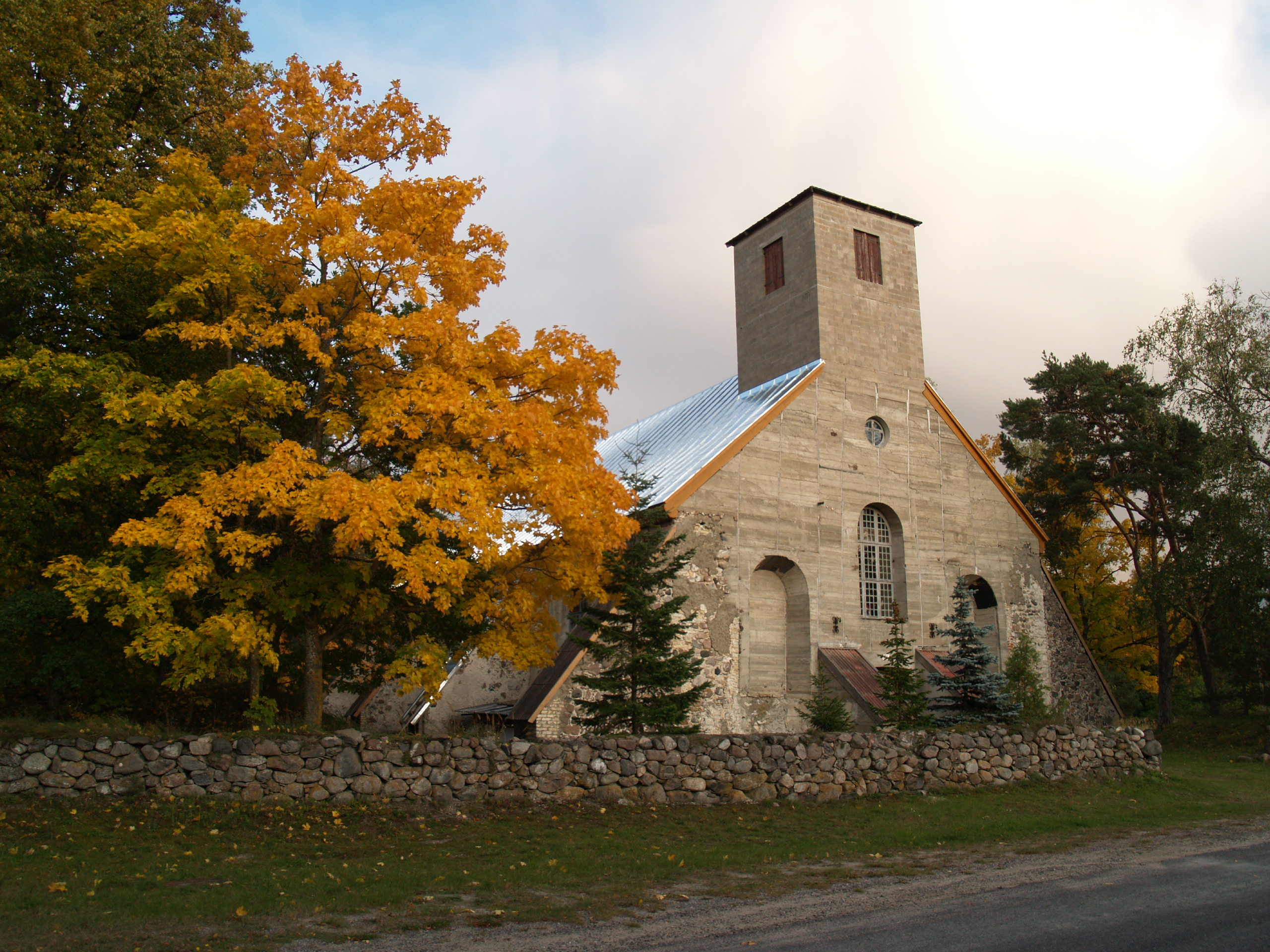
St. Mary's Lutheran Church in Tõstamaa

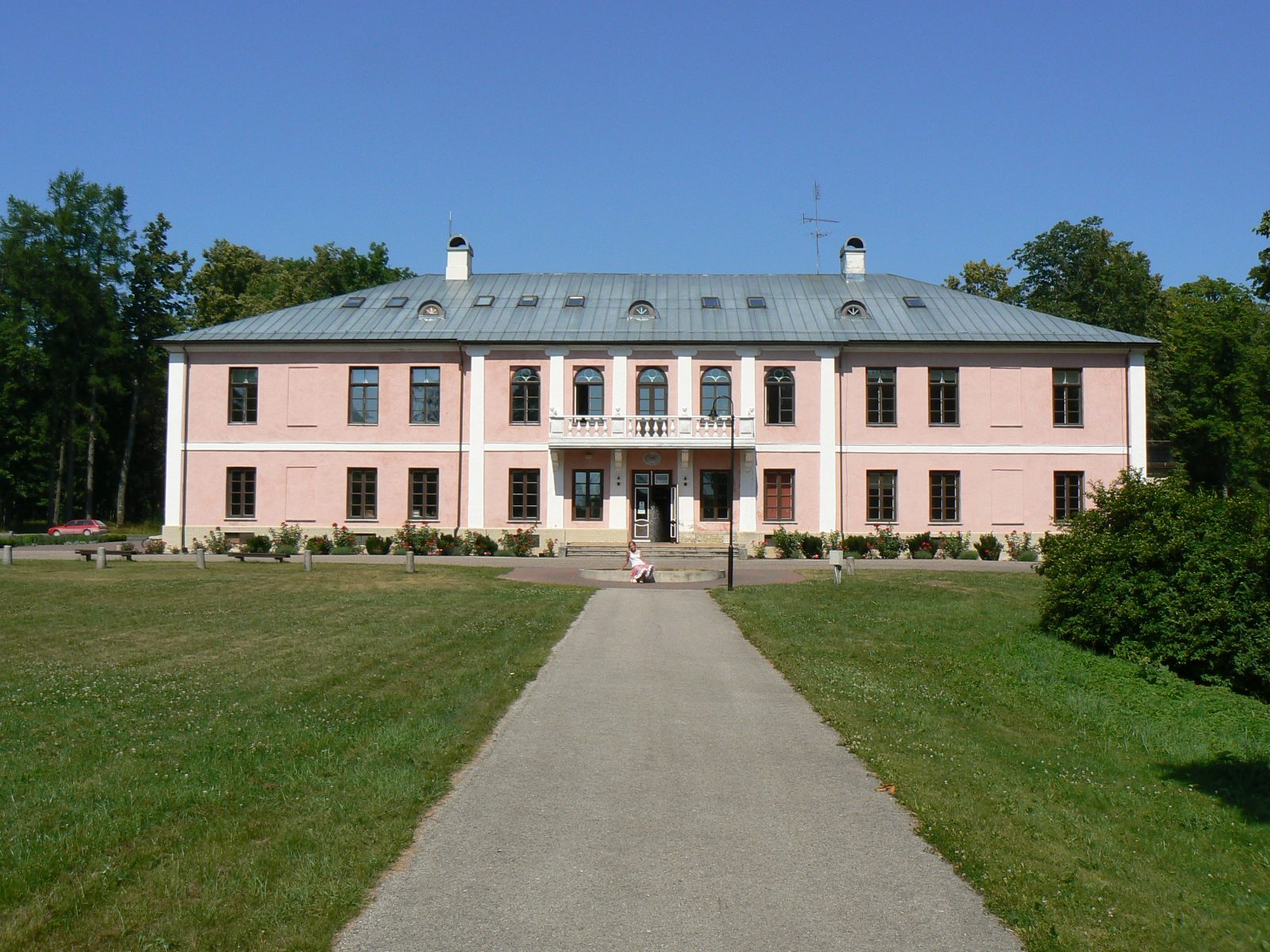
Tõstamaa Manor

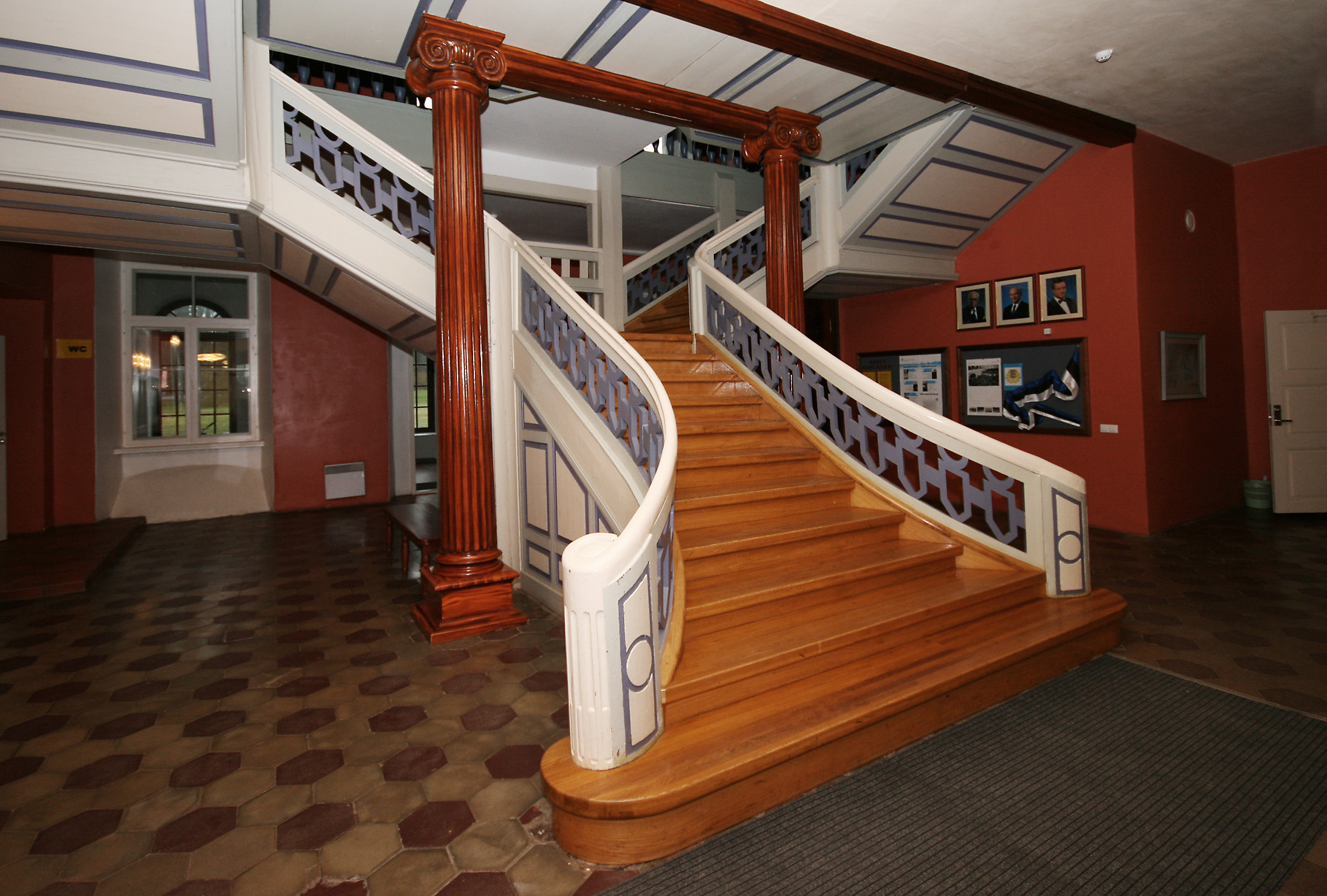
Manor lobby

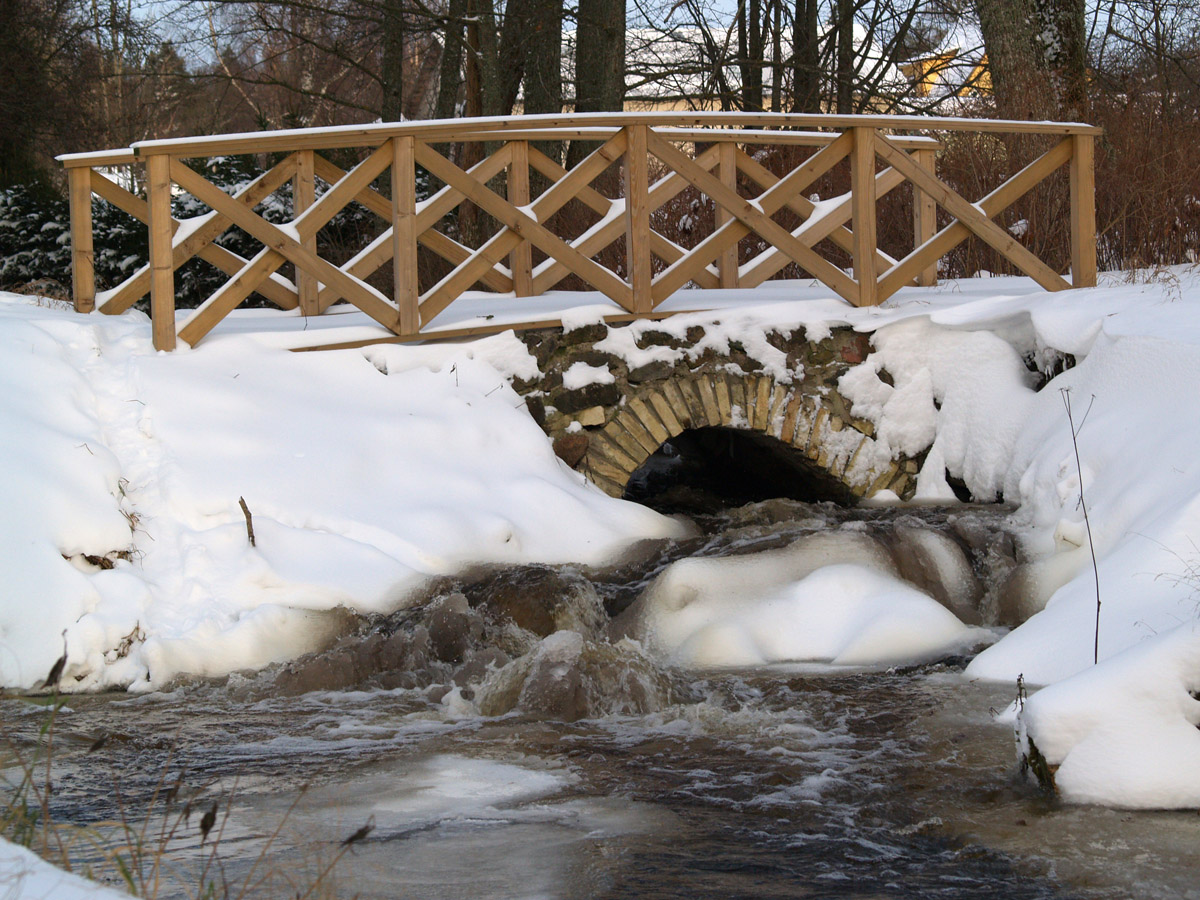
Tõstamaa River in winter
