= Baltic Touring Car Championship =

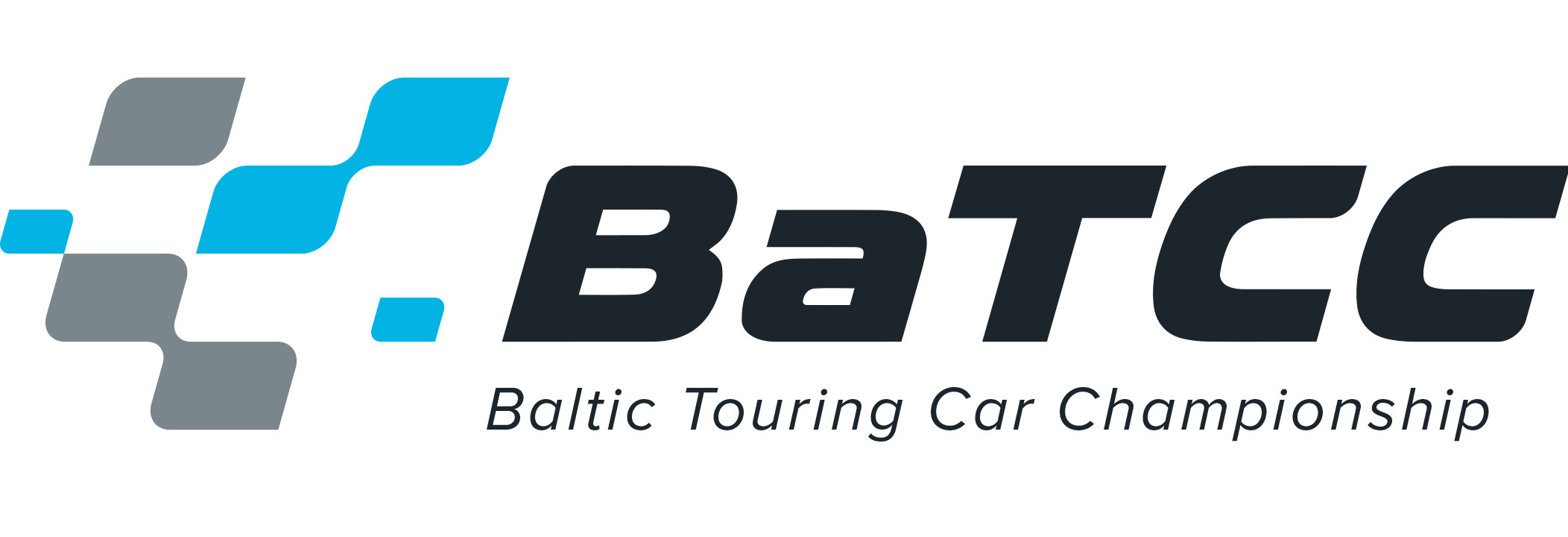
- Category: Touring cars
- Country: Baltic States
- Inaugural season: 2000
- Tyre suppliers: Hankook
- Drivers' champion: (Latvia) BGT PRO Arturs Batraks (Latvia) BMW 325 Matiss Malinovskis (Lithuania) BTC2 Agnius Narbutas (Estonia) BTC3 Sven Karuse (Lithuania) BGT AM+ Audrius Piktys (Lithuania) BGT AM Paulius Urbonavicius (Latvia) V1600 Mareks Matvejevs
- Teams' champion: (Latvia) Smart Cooling by Flash Racing LV
- Official website: http://www.batcc.eu

The Baltic Touring Car Championship or BaTCC is a touring car racing series held each year in the Baltic states. The championship is regulated by a board containing two representatives each from the automobile associations of Estonia, Latvia and Lithuania. Eligible cars for the championship have often changed over recent years. In 2025 there are class entries for GT classes, Touring car classes(up to 1600ccm, up to 2000ccm, up to 3000ccm and up to 4000ccm), V1600 and mono classes BMW 325 CUP and BMW Turbo Cup. Teams and driversparticipate in sprint races 15-20 min long or in 2h Endurance race.

Races are held in race tracks in Baltic States and Finland. Audru ring in Estonia, Bikernieki in Latvia, Nemuno Ziedas in Lithuania, Tor Poznan in Poland and Botniaring in Finland.

The race day format features two races per round, with standing starts BMW 325 CUP and Touring cars and rolling start for GT cars.

For 2021 season for the first time The Nations Cup and the Team standings were introduced. Lithuania won in 2024, followed by Latvia and Estonia.

== Racing classes ==
The following shows the key specifications issues for each class. Baltic Touring Cars category have two 15-20 min races per event. While Nankang 2h Endurance Academy Championship has one 2 hour race per event.

=== BTC ===
BTC1 cars with engine capacity from up to 1600cm3.

BTC2 cars with engine capacity up to 2000cm3.

BTC3 cars with engine capacity up to 3000cm3.

BTC4 cars with engine capacity up to 4000cm3. Class BTC4 maximum engine capacity is allowed 4000cm3 which includes all the ratios of the Technical Regulations. (Example: 2000cm3 bi-turbo engine has a ratio 1,7 which means actual engine capacity would equal 3400 cm3).

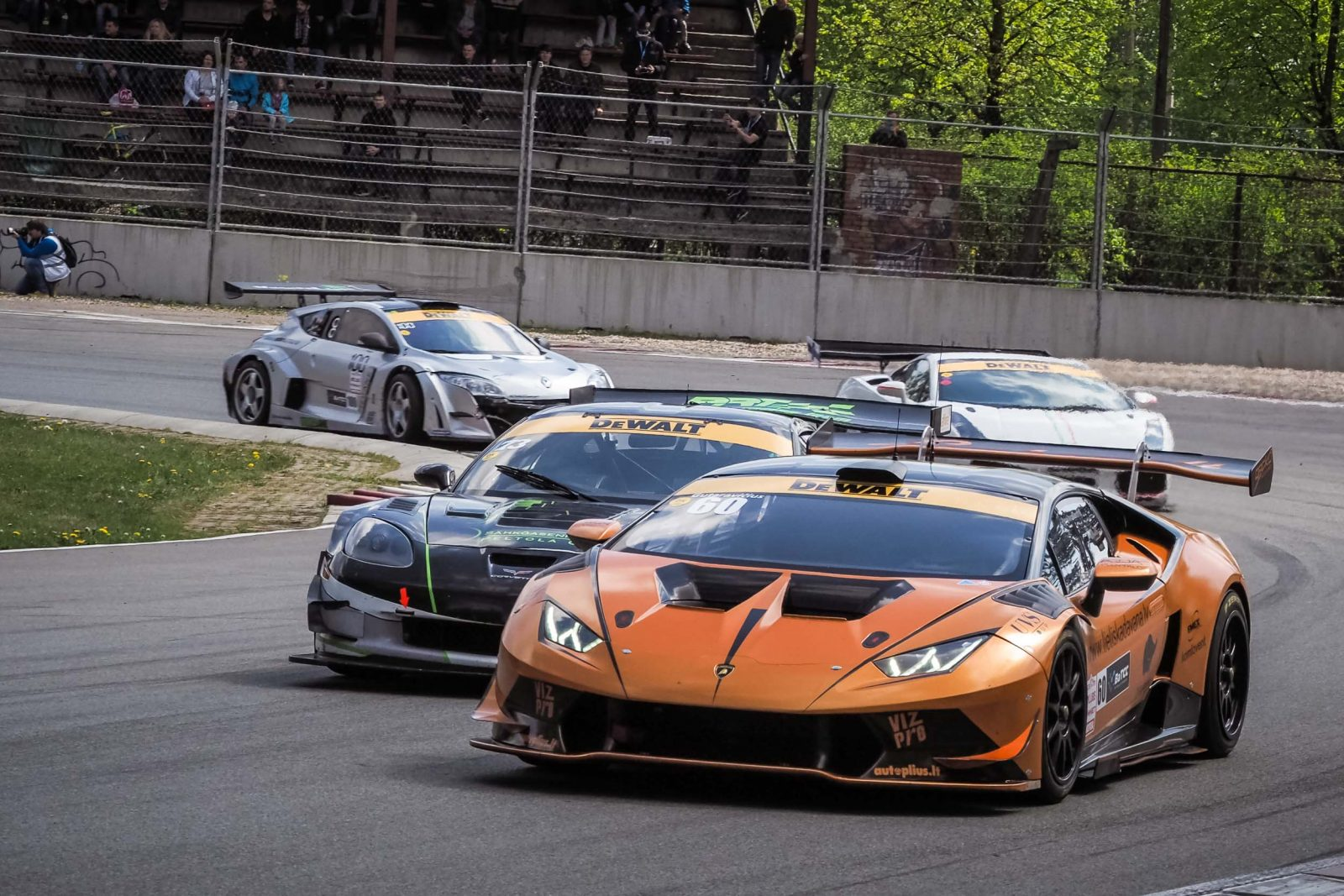
BTC cars in action

BGT AM or Baltic GT AM class is meant for series production cars with front mounted engines and SRO GT4 cars. Air restrictor for turbo cars.

BGT PRO or Baltic GT PRO class is series production cars and non series production cars (with tubular frame bodywork, or semi-tubular bodywork, or monocoque bodywork), LM GTE, GT3 cars.

== Calendar 2026 ==
1. (Latvia) Biķernieki Complex Sports Base, Washcar Summer Race, April 30 - May 3
2. (Latvia) Biķernieki Complex Sports Base, STATETA BRO | PRO BRO Grand Prix, June 5-6
3. (Lithuania) Nemuno Žiedas, STATETA BRO | PRO BRO Grand Prix Kaunas, July 3-4
4. (Estonia) Porschering, Parnu Summer Race, August 27-30
5. (Poland) Tor Poznań, Season Finale, September 18-20

== Champions ==
Season	Baltic GT Champion	TCR Champion	BTC 2 Champion	BTC 1 Champion	Super 1600 Champion	National Class Champion	BEC Champion
1999	(Estonia) Indrek Sepp (S2000)						
2000	(Estonia) Indrek Sepp (B2000)				(Estonia) Martin Merisaar		
2001	(Latvia) Arnis Jursevskis (B2000)				(Estonia) Martin Merisaar		
2002	(Estonia) Aivis Ohtla (B2000)				(Latvia) Jānis Vorobjovs		
2003	(Latvia) Girts Krüzmanis (B2000)				(Lithuania) Robertas Kupčikas		
2004	(Latvia) Girts Krüzmanis (B2000)				(Lithuania) Marius Milevskis		
2005	(Estonia) Indrek Sepp (S2000)				(Estonia) Madis Kasemets	(Latvia) Jānis Kārkliņš	
2006	(Finland) Antti-Veikko Pakalen (S2000)				(Lithuania) Mindaugas Neliubsys	(Latvia) Normunds Šubeckis	
2007	(Latvia) Egons Lapins (B2000)				(Latvia) Lauris Vidžis	(Latvia) Agris Petrovskis	
2008	(Latvia) Egons Lapins (Superproduction)				(Lithuania) Karolis Doleba	(Latvia) Uldis Timaks	
2009	(Latvia) Marcis Birkens (Superproduction)				(Estonia) Roland Feodorov	(Latvia) Vitālijs Kalmi	
2010	(Latvia) Marcis Birkens (Superproduction)				(Estonia) Andres Hall	(Latvia) Kristaps Mietulis	
2011	(Latvia) Uldis Timaks (Superproduction)				(Estonia) Raul Karu	(Latvia) Didzis Pope	
2012	(Latvia) Vitālijs Kalmi (GT Open)				(Lithuania) Mantas Neverdauskas	(Latvia) Igors Zubkovs	
2013	(Latvia) Artjoms Kočlamazašvili (GT Open)				(Russia) Nikolay Zhuravlev	(Latvia) Lauris Vīgants	
2014	(Lithuania) Eidmantas Nekrošius (GT Open)				(Latvia) Jānis Ciekals	(Latvia) Viktors Vasiļjevs	
2015	(Lithuania) Dainius Matijošaitis (GT Open)		(Lithuania) Andrius Jasonauskas	(Lithuania) Edvinas Mardosas	(Latvia) Kristaps Mietulis	(Latvia) Garijs Rožkalns	(Lithuania) Rotoma Racing (BMW M3)
2016	(Lithuania) Saulius Beržis (GT Open)		(Lithuania) Alvydas Malakauskas	(Lithuania) Julius Skirmantas	(Latvia) Mārtiņš Sesks	(Latvia) Jānis Vanks	(Lithuania) RIMO Racing (BMW 330D)
2017	(Latvia) Pavel Shchapov (GT Open)		(Lithuania) Ernesta Globyte	(Russia) Andrey Yushin	(Estonia) Steven Puust	(Latvia) Jānis Vanks	(Lithuania) Skuba Dream (Porsche GT3)
2018	(Finland) Marko Rantanen (GT Open)		(Lithuania) Ernesta Globyte	(Estonia) Peeter Peek	(Russia) Dmitry Savateev	(Latvia) Jānis Vanks	(Lithuania) GSR Motorsport (VW Golf GTI TCR)
2019	(Estonia) Raivo Tamm (GT Open)	(Lithuania) Dziugas Tovilavicius	(Finland) Jyrki Jonkkari	(Lithuania) Marius Miskunas	(Lithuania) Richardas Martinkevičius	No class	(Lithuania) Circle K milesPLUS Racing Team (Porsche GT3 CUP)

Season	GT PRO Champion	GT AM Champion	TCR Champion	BMW 325 CUP Champion	V1600 Champion	Endurance Champion	BEC Champion
2020	(Latvia) Vilnis Batraks	(Lithuania) Edvinas Einikis	Cancelled	(Latvia) Matiss Mezaks	Not held	Cancelled	Cancelled
2021	(Lithuania) Sim Racer	(Lithuania) Laurynas Kriksciunas	(Latvia) Valters Zviedris	(Lithuania) Karolis Jovaisa	(Latvia) Karlis Ozolins	(Lithuania) Noker Racing Team	(Lithuania) RD Signs
2022	(Estonia) Thomas Kangro	(Lithuania) Kastytis Volbekas	(Latvia) Ivars Vallers	(Latvia) Valters Zviedris	(Finland) Matias Nuoramo	(Finland) Black Rose Racing	(Lithuania) Porsche Baltic GT3
2023	(Lithuania) Ignas Jomantas	(United Kingdom) Drew Holland	(Lithuania) Darius Zitlinskas	(France) Leo Messenger	(Latvia) Raivis Meilands	(Latvia) Jurmala - Optibet Racing	(Lithuania) Hmobile by AMG Customer Racing

Season	GT PRO Champion	GT AM Champion	GT AM+	BMW 325 CUP Champion	V1600 Champion	BMW Turbo Cup Champion	Hankook Endurance Champion
2024	(Lithuania) Karolis Stasiukynas	(Finland) Jyrki Jonkkari	Not held	(Latvia) Ricards Subeckis	(Estonia) Ragnar Simuland	Not held	
2025	(Lithuania) Gediminas Baksys	(Lithuania) Rokas Kvedaras	(Lithuania) Egidijus Gelunas	(Estonia) Ragnar Simuland	(Latvia) Mareks Matvejevs	(Latvia) Artjoms Koclamazasvili	(Lithuania) Baltic Karting Academy
2026	(Latvia) Arturs Batraks	(Lithuania) Paulius Urbonavicius	(Lithuania) Audrius Piktys	(Latvia) Matiss Malinovskis	(Latvia) Mareks Matvejevs	(Lithuania) Aurimas Mistautas	(Latvia) Smart Cooling by Flash Racing

== Circuits used ==
- (Estonia) Audru Ring
- (Latvia) Biķernieki Complex Sports Base
- (Finland) Botniaring Racing Circuit
- (Lithuania) Nemuno Žiedas
- (Poland) Tor_Poznań
