= 2019 Baltic Endurance Championship =

International touring car racing series

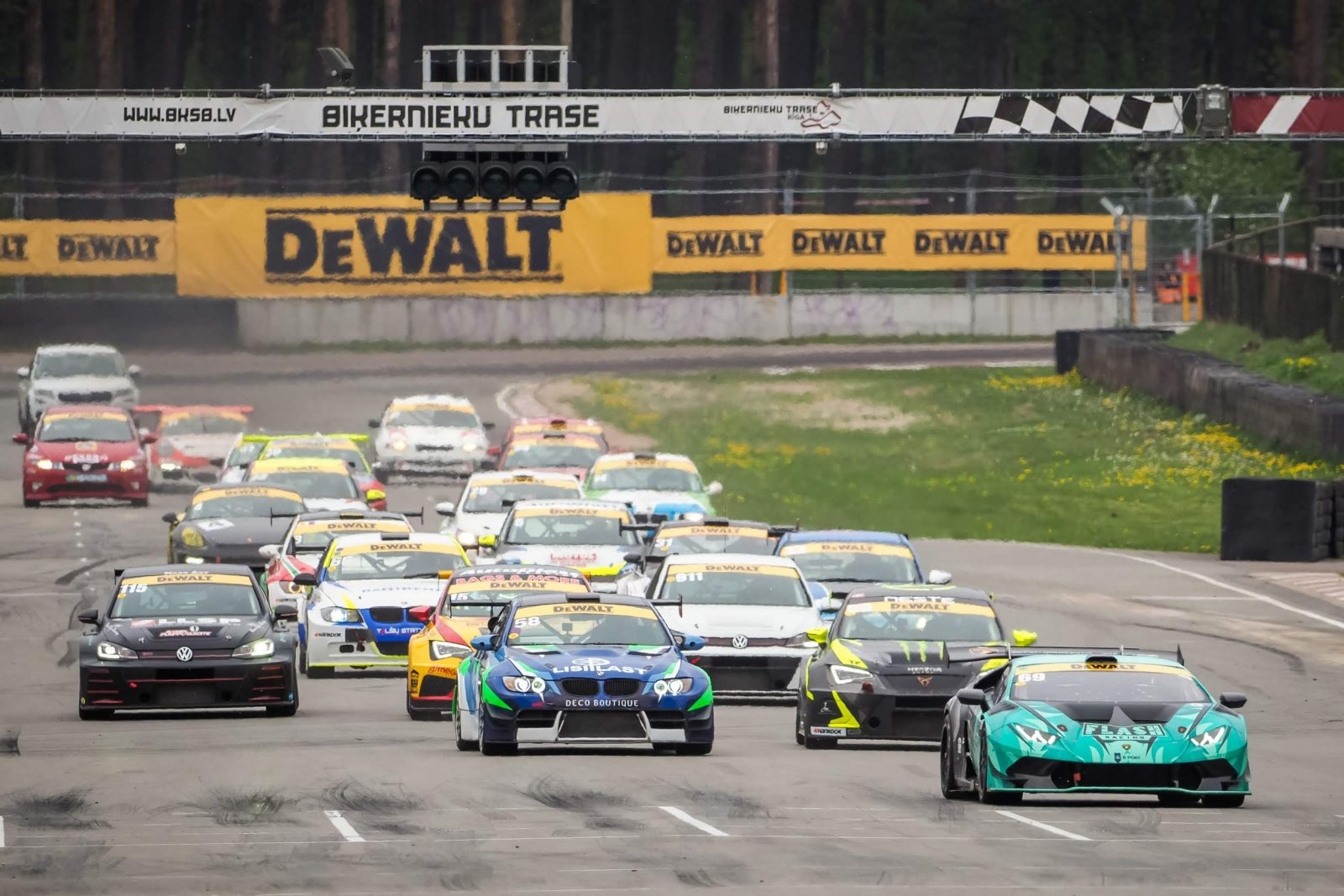
Start of the race at DeWALT GP in Riga, May 2019

The 2019 Baltic Endurance Championship was the fifth Baltic Endurance Championship season. It began at Biķernieki Complex Sports Base on 10 May and ended at Auto24ring on 21 September.

== Calendar ==
Rnd.	Circuit	Length	Date
1	(Latvia) Biķernieki Complex Sports Base, Riga	6 Hours	10–12 May
2	(Finland) Botniaring Racing Circuit, Jurva	6 Hours	14–16 June
3	(Latvia) Biķernieki Complex Sports Base, Riga	6 Hours	16–18 August
4	(Estonia) Auto24ring, Pärnu	6 Hours	20–21 September

== Teams ==
Team	Car	No.	Class	Rounds
(Lithuania) Porsche Baltic	Porsche Cayman GT4 Clubsport MR	4	GTA	All
(Lithuania) GSR Motorsport	Volkswagen Golf GTI TCR	5	TCR	All
(Lithuania) Akademija Motorsportas	Honda Civic Type R	7	A2	1
(Lithuania) Topratai.lt	Honda Civic Type R	7	A2	3−4
(Lithuania) Techninis Projektas-Viada	BMW M3 E92	8	GTA	1, 3−4
(Lithuania) IGORIOLANKAI	CUPRA León TCR	9	TCR	3−4
(Lithuania) RM Klubas	Honda Civic Type R	10	A2	3−4
(Lithuania) Anteja.LT Racing Team	BMW 135d	11	DC	3−4
(Russia) TB Racing	BMW M3 E92	13	GTA	4
(Lithuania) AutoGlass Service	BMW M3 E92	14	GTA	1
(Lithuania) DHL Racing Team	CUPRA León TCR	15	TCR	All
(Lithuania) 4race	BMW 123d	17	DC	2, 4
(Lithuania) Mažeikių Auto Sporto Klubas	Peugeot 308 Racing Cup	20	A3	All
(Latvia) Bruno Racing Team	BMW 330	30	A3	1, 3−4
(Lithuania) ITCC Racing	BMW M3 E46	31	A3+	1
(Lithuania) Mv Sport	Hyundai i30 N TCR	33	TCR	1
(Finland) Meretek racing by Special Stage	BMW M3 E90D	46	DC	2, 4
(Finland) Team R2M Performance	BMW 330d	51	DC	1−3
(Lithuania) Rotoma Racing	BMW M3 E92	58	GTA	1, 3−4
(Lithuania) Redus LT	Volkswagen Golf	59	DC	1, 3−4
(Lithuania) Telšių Statyba	BMW M3 E92	66	A3+	1, 3
Flash Racing Latvia	Lamborghini Huracán Super Trofeo	69	GTP	All
(Lithuania) Circle K MilesPLUS Racing Team	Porsche 991 GT3 Cup II	71	GTP	All
(Lithuania) Kautra Subaru Racing Team	Subaru BRZ	77	A3	4
(Estonia) ACAP Racing	Toyota Corolla	81	A2	All
(Finland) KSB Racing	Ford Mustang	85	GTP	4
(Lithuania) Helios Sport	BMW M3 E46	88	A3	1, 3−4
(Lithuania) MM 911 Racing	Porsche 991 GT3 Cup II	91	GTP	3
(Lithuania) Energizer Racing	Volkswagen Golf GTI TCR	95	TCR	All
(Lithuania) RDsigns racing	BMW Z4	96	A3+	2−4
(Lithuania) Neste Dream 2 Drive PRO	Volkswagen Golf GTI TCR	99	TCR	All
(Finland) Black Rose Racing	Volkswagen Golf GTI TCR	115	TCR	1−3
(Lithuania) Noker Racing Team	Volkswagen Golf GTI TCR	911	TCR	All
(Lithuania) SKUBA Racing Team	Volkswagen Golf GTI TCR	912	TCR	All

Icon	Class
GTP	GT PRO
GTA	GT AM
TCR	TCR Endurance
A3+	A3000+ Class
A3	A3000 Class
A2	A2000 Class
DC	Diesel Class

== Calendar and results ==
Rnd.	Circuit	GT PRO Winner	GT AM Winner	TCR Winner	A3000+ Winner	A3000 Winner	A2000 Winner	Diesel Winner
1	(Latvia) Biķernieki Complex Sports Base	(Lithuania) No. 71 Circle K MilesPLUS Racing Team	(Lithuania) No. 8 Techninis Projektas-Viada	(Lithuania) No. 99 Dream 2 Drive PRO	(Lithuania) No. 66 Telšių Statyba	(Lithuania) No. 20 Mažeikių Auto Sporto Klubas	(Estonia) No. 81 ACAP Racing	(Lithuania) No. 59 Redus LT
2	(Finland) Botniaring Racing Circuit	(Lithuania) No. 71 Circle K MilesPLUS Racing Team	(Lithuania) No. 4 Porsche Baltic	(Lithuania) No. 911 Noker Racing Team	(Lithuania) No. 96 RDsigns racing	(Lithuania) No. 20 Mažeikių Auto Sporto Klubas	(Estonia) No. 81 ACAP Racing	(Finland) No. 46 Meretek Racing by Special Stage
3	(Latvia) Biķernieki Complex Sports Base	No. 69 Flash Racing Latvia	(Lithuania) No. 58 Rotoma Racing	(Lithuania) No. 912 Skuba Racing Team	(Lithuania) No. 66 Telšių Statyba	(Lithuania) No. 20 Mažeikių Auto Sporto Klubas	(Estonia) No. 81 ACAP Racing	(Lithuania) No. 11 Anteja.LT Racing Team
4	(Estonia) Auto24ring	(Lithuania) No. 71 Circle K MilesPLUS Racing Team	(Lithuania) No. 58 Rotoma Racing	(Lithuania) No. 15 DHL Racing Team	(Lithuania) No. 96 RDsigns racing	(Lithuania) No. 20 Mažeikių Auto Sporto Klubas	(Lithuania) No. 10 RM Klubas	(Lithuania) No. 17 4race

Scoring system

Position	**1st**	**2nd**	**3rd**	**4th**	**5th**	**6th**	**7th**	**8th**	**9th**	**10th**	**11th**	**12th**	**13th**	**14th**	**15th**	**16th**	**17th**	**18th**	**19th**	**20th**	**21st**	**22nd**	**23rd**	**24th**	**25th**
Race	60	50	42	36	32	28	24	22	20	18	16	14	13	12	11	10	9	8	7	6	5	4	3	2	1

=== Championship standings ===
==== Overall ====
Pos.	Team	Class	(Latvia) BIK	(Finland) BOT	(Latvia) BIK	(Estonia) PÄR	Pts.
1	(Lithuania) No. 71 Circle K MilesPLUS Racing Team	GTP	1	1	12	1	194
2	No. 69 Flash Racing Latvia	GTP	**Ret**	**2**	**1**	**5**	142
3	(Lithuania) No. 15 DHL Racing Team	TCR	5	7	3	3	140
4	(Lithuania) No. 912 Skuba Racing Team	TCR	7	4	2	12	124
5	(Lithuania) No. 99 Dream 2 Drive PRO	TCR	2	15	9	4	117
6	(Lithuania) No. 95 Energizer Racing	TCR	6	5	6	8	112
7	(Lithuania) No. 911 Noker Racing Team	TCR	4	3	19	13	98
8	(Lithuania) No. 58 Rotoma Racing	GTA	Ret		4	2	86
9	(Lithuania) No. 4 Porsche Baltic	GTA	11	8	7	11	78
10	(Lithuania) No. 20 Mažeikių Auto Sporto Klubas	A3	12	9	10	10	70
11	(Lithuania) No. 8 Techninis Projektas-Viada	GTA	9		8	7	64
12	(Lithuania) No. 9 IGORIOLANKAI	TCR			5	6	60
13	(Finland) No. 115 Black Rose Racing	TCR	10	6	22		50
14	(Lithuania) No. 33 Mv Sport	TCR	3				42
15	(Estonia) No. 81 ACAP Racing	A2	15	12	17	20	40
16	(Lithuania) No. 88 Helios Sport	A3	13		13	17	35
17	(Lithuania) No. 5 GSR Motorsport	TCR	Ret	13	Ret	9	33
18	(Lithuania) No. 66 Telšių Statyba	A3+	8		15		33
19	(Latvia) No. 30 Bruno Racing Team	A3	19		20	15	24
20	(Latvia) No. 17 4race	DC		11		19	23
21	(Finland) No. 46 Meretek Racing by Special Stage	DC		10		21	23
22	(Lithuania) No. 96 RDsigns racing	A3+		16	Ret	14	22
23	(Lithuania) No. 7 Akademija Motorsportas / Topratai.lt	A2	16		18	22	22
24	(Lithuania) No. 59 Redus LT	DC	14		21	23	20
25	(Lithuania) No. 10 RM Klubas	A2			16	18	18
26	(Lithuania) No. 91 MM 911 Racing	GTP			11		16
27	(Lithuania) No. 11 Anteja.LT Racing Team	DC			14	Ret	12
28	(Finland) No. 51 Team R2M Performance	DC	Ret	14	Ret		12
29	(Russia) No. 13 TB Racing	GTA				16	10
30	(Lithuania) No. 14 AutoGlass Service	GTA	17				9
31	(Lithuania) No. 31 ITCC Racing	A3+	18				8
32	(Lithuania) No. 77 Kautra Subaru Racing Team	A3				Ret	0
33	(Finland) No. 85 KSB Racing	GTP				Ret	0
Pos.	Team	Class	(Latvia) BIK	(Finland) BOT	(Latvia) BIK	(Estonia) PÄR	Pts.

Colour	Result
Gold	Winner
Silver	Second place
Bronze	Third place
Green	Points classification
Blue	Non-points classification
Blue	Non-classified finish (NC)
Purple	Retired, not classified (Ret)
Red	Did not qualify (DNQ)
Red	Did not pre-qualify (DNPQ)
Black	Disqualified (DSQ)
White	Did not start (DNS)
White	Withdrew (WD)
White	Race cancelled (C)
Blank	Did not practice (DNP)
Blank	Did not arrive (DNA)
Blank	Excluded (EX)

**Bold** – Pole
Italics – Fastest Lap
