= 2014 Formula Renault 1.6 Nordic season =

The 2014 Formula Renault 1.6 Nordic season was the second season of the Formula Renault 1.6 Nordic, a series running 1600cc Formula Renault machinery in similar fashion to the French F4 Championship. The series began on 3 May at Karlskoga Motorstadion and ended on 20 September at Mantorp Park, after seventeen races held in seven venues. Most of these rounds were held in support of the 2014 Scandinavian Touring Car Championship season, joint organiser of the series along with the FIA Northern European Zone Organisation.

The series uses all-carbon Signatech chassis, 1.6-litre 140bhp Renault K4MRS engines, and Dunlop tyres.

== Drivers and teams ==
Team	No.	Drivers	Rounds
Sundahl Racing	1	(Sweden) Lukas Sundahl	All
Aabol Racing	6	(Norway) Kevin Aabol	All
FinnDrive	7	(Finland) Joonas Lappalainen	All
FinnDrive	8	(Finland) Ilmari Korpivaara	All
Scuderia Nordica	9	(Sweden) Oliver Söderström	1–2, 4, 6–7
Scuderia Nordica	89	(Estonia) Ralf Aron	1–2, 4–7
Trackstar Racing	11	(Sweden) Pontus Fredricsson	All
Trackstar Racing	12	(New Zealand) (Sweden) Paul Blomqvist	All
Trackstar Racing	81	(Sweden) David Nordgren	1, 7
Trackstar Racing	99	(Sweden) Karl Ero	All
BR Motorsport	14	(Sweden) Robin Hansson	1
Magic Racing	23	(Sweden) Otto Tjäder	1, 3
Lyran Engineering	44	(Sweden) Rasmus Eriksson	1, 3–5, 7
Svensson Racing	47	(Sweden) Robert Svensson	All
Fredriksson Racing	67	(Sweden) Robin Fredriksson	All

== Race calendar and results ==
Most rounds took place in Sweden, with the second round held in Finland and the fourth round held in Estonia. With the exception of the season-opening venue, all Swedish rounds were held in support of the STCC championship.

Rounds denoted with a blue background were a part of the Formula Renault 1.6 NEZ Championship.

Round		Circuit	Date	Pole position	Fastest lap	Winning driver
1	R1	Karlskoga Motorstadion, Karlskoga	3 May	(Finland) Joonas Lappalainen	(Finland) Joonas Lappalainen	(Sweden) Robin Hansson
1	R2	Karlskoga Motorstadion, Karlskoga	3 May	(Finland) Joonas Lappalainen	(Finland) Joonas Lappalainen	(Finland) Joonas Lappalainen
2	R1	Botniaring Racing Circuit, Kurikka	17 May	(Finland) Joonas Lappalainen	(Finland) Joonas Lappalainen	(Finland) Joonas Lappalainen
2	R2	Botniaring Racing Circuit, Kurikka	18 May	(Finland) Joonas Lappalainen	(Finland) Joonas Lappalainen	(Finland) Joonas Lappalainen
2	R3	Botniaring Racing Circuit, Kurikka	18 May	(Finland) Joonas Lappalainen	(Sweden) Lukas Sundahl	(Estonia) Ralf Aron
3	R1	Falkenbergs Motorbana, Bergagård	12 July	(Sweden) Lukas Sundahl	(Sweden) Lukas Sundahl	(Sweden) Lukas Sundahl
3	R2	Falkenbergs Motorbana, Bergagård	12 July	(Sweden) Lukas Sundahl	(Sweden) Robert Svensson	(Sweden) Lukas Sundahl
3	R3	Falkenbergs Motorbana, Bergagård	13 July	(Sweden) Pontus Fredricsson	(Sweden) Robert Svensson	(Sweden) Pontus Fredricsson
3	R4	Falkenbergs Motorbana, Bergagård	13 July	Race cancelled due to heavy rain		
4	R1	Audru Ring, Audru	9 August	(Norway) Kevin Aabol	(Estonia) Ralf Aron	(Sweden) Oliver Söderström
4	R2	Audru Ring, Audru	9 August	(Estonia) Ralf Aron	(New Zealand) Paul Blomqvist	(Sweden) Robert Svensson
5	R1	Ring Knutstorp, Kågeröd	23 August	(Finland) Joonas Lappalainen	(Norway) Kevin Aabol	(Finland) Joonas Lappalainen
5	R2	Ring Knutstorp, Kågeröd	23 August	(Norway) Kevin Aabol	(Finland) Joonas Lappalainen	(Norway) Kevin Aabol
6	R1	Solvalla, Stockholm	6 September	(Finland) Joonas Lappalainen	(Estonia) Ralf Aron	(Estonia) Ralf Aron
6	R2	Solvalla, Stockholm	6 September	(Estonia) Ralf Aron	(Estonia) Ralf Aron	(Estonia) Ralf Aron
7	R1	Mantorp Park, Mantorp	20 September	(Estonia) Ralf Aron	(Estonia) Ralf Aron	(Estonia) Ralf Aron
7	R2	Mantorp Park, Mantorp	20 September	(Estonia) Ralf Aron	(Estonia) Ralf Aron	(Estonia) Ralf Aron

== Championship standings ==
Points system

Points were awarded to the top 10 classified finishers. No points were awarded for pole or fastest lap.

Position	**1st**	**2nd**	**3rd**	**4th**	**5th**	**6th**	**7th**	**8th**	**9th**	**10th**
Points	25	18	15	12	10	8	6	4	2	1

Parallel to the main championship, two other championships were held: the Formula Renault 1.6 Junior Svenskt Mästerskap (JSM) for drivers under 26 years old holding a Swedish driver license, and the Formula Renault 1.6 Northern European Zone (NEZ) championship at selected rounds. Points to these championships were awarded using the same system.

=== Formula Renault 1.6 Nordic Championship ===
Pos	Driver	KAR		BOT			FAL				AUD		KNU		SOL		MAN		Pts
1	(Finland) Joonas Lappalainen	**2**	**1**	**1**	**1**	**2**	Ret	6	2	C	5	2	**1**	3	**8**	8	4	5	235
2	(Norway) Kevin Aabol	6	7	3	4	4	2	3	Ret	C	**4**	3	2	**1**	2	3	8	4	205
3	(Sweden) Lukas Sundahl	5	6	2	2	5	**1**	**1**	6	C	7	8	4	2	6	10	3	12	186
4	(Sweden) Pontus Fredricsson	12	5	4	3	3	5	2	**1**	C	2	Ret	Ret	5	4	2	9	3	180
5	(Sweden) Robert Svensson	7	8	5	7	8	3	4	9	C	6	1	3	4	3	4	5	6	164
6	(Estonia) Ralf Aron	10	13	6	9	1					8	**6**	Ret	Ret	1	**1**	**1**	**1**	146
7	(Finland) Ilmari Korpivaara	8	9	8	5	7	4	9	4	C	3	Ret	5	6	5	5	7	2	129
8	(Sweden) Oliver Söderström	4	4	6	10	11					1	4			7	6	2	7	108
9	(New Zealand) (Sweden) Paul Blomqvist	3	3	9	6	6	9	Ret	3	C	10	5	Ret	Ret	9	7	6	8	96
10	(Sweden) Robin Fredriksson	11	11	10	8	8	8	Ret	7	C	9	7	6	7	10	9	12	9	44
11	(Sweden) Robin Hansson	1	2																43
12	(Sweden) Rasmus Eriksson	9	10				7	5	8	C	Ret	Ret	7	Ret			11	10	30
13	(Sweden) Otto Tjäder	DNS	DNS				6	7	5	C									24
14	(Sweden) Karl Ero	Ret	12	11	Ret	10	Ret	8	Ret	C	11	9	8	8	Ret	11	10	Ret	16
15	(Sweden) David Nordgren	13	Ret														13	11	0
Pos	Driver	KAR		BOT			FAL				AUD		KNU		SOL		MAN		Pts

Colour	Result
Gold	Winner
Silver	Second place
Bronze	Third place
Green	Points classification
Blue	Non-points classification
Blue	Non-classified finish (NC)
Purple	Retired, not classified (Ret)
Red	Did not qualify (DNQ)
Red	Did not pre-qualify (DNPQ)
Black	Disqualified (DSQ)
White	Did not start (DNS)
White	Withdrew (WD)
White	Race cancelled (C)
Blank	Did not practice (DNP)
Blank	Did not arrive (DNA)
Blank	Excluded (EX)

**Bold** – Pole
Italics – Fastest Lap

=== Formula Renault 1.6 JSM Championship ===
Pos	Driver	KAR		BOT			FAL				AUD		KNU		SOL		MAN		Pts
1	(Sweden) Lukas Sundahl	5	6	2	2	5	1	1	6	C	7	8	4	2	6	10	3	12	262
2	(Sweden) Robert Svensson	7	8	5	7	8	3	4	9	C	6	1	3	4	3	4	5	6	255
3	(Sweden) Pontus Fredricsson	12	5	4	3	3	5	2	1	C	2	Ret	Ret	5	4	2	9	3	246
4	(New Zealand) (Sweden) Paul Blomqvist	3	3	9	6	6	9	Ret	3	C	10	5	Ret	Ret	9	7	6	8	169
5	(Sweden) Oliver Söderström	4	4	6	10	11					1	4			7	6	2	7	166
6	(Sweden) Robin Fredriksson	11	11	10	8	8	8	Ret	7	C	9	7	6	7	10	9	12	9	137
7	(Sweden) Karl Ero	Ret	12	11	Ret	10	Ret	8	Ret	C	11	9	8	8	Ret	11	10	Ret	82
8	(Sweden) Rasmus Eriksson	9	10				7	5	8	C	Ret	Ret	7	Ret			11	10	70
9	(Sweden) Robin Hansson	1	2																50
10	(Sweden) Otto Tjäder	DNS	DNS				6	7	5	C									37
11	(Sweden) David Nordgren	13	Ret														13	11	10
Pos	Driver	KAR		BOT			FAL				AUD		KNU		SOL		MAN		Pts

=== Formula Renault 1.6 NEZ Championship ===
Pos	Driver	BOT			AUD		MAN		Pts
1	(Finland) Joonas Lappalainen	**1**	**1**	**2**	5	2	4	5	118
2	(Estonia) Ralf Aron	6	9	1	8	**6**	**1**	**1**	95
3	(Norway) Kevin Aabol	3	4	4	**4**	3	8	4	82
4	(Sweden) Pontus Fredricsson	4	3	3	2	Ret	9	3	77
5	(Sweden) Robert Svensson	5	7	8	6	1	5	6	71
6	(Sweden) Lukas Sundahl	2	2	5	7	8	3	12	71
7	(Sweden) Oliver Söderström	6	10	11	1	4	2	7	70
8	(Finland) Ilmari Korpivaara	8	5	7	3	Ret	7	2	60
9	(New Zealand) (Sweden) Paul Blomqvist	9	6	6	10	5	6	8	41
10	(Sweden) Robin Fredriksson	10	8	8	9	7	12	9	17
11	(Sweden) Karl Ero	11	Ret	10	11	9	10	Ret	4
12	(Sweden) Rasmus Eriksson				Ret	Ret	11	10	1
13	(Sweden) David Nordgren						13	11	0
Pos	Driver	BOT			AUD		MAN		Pts
