= 2019 Baltic Touring Car Championship =

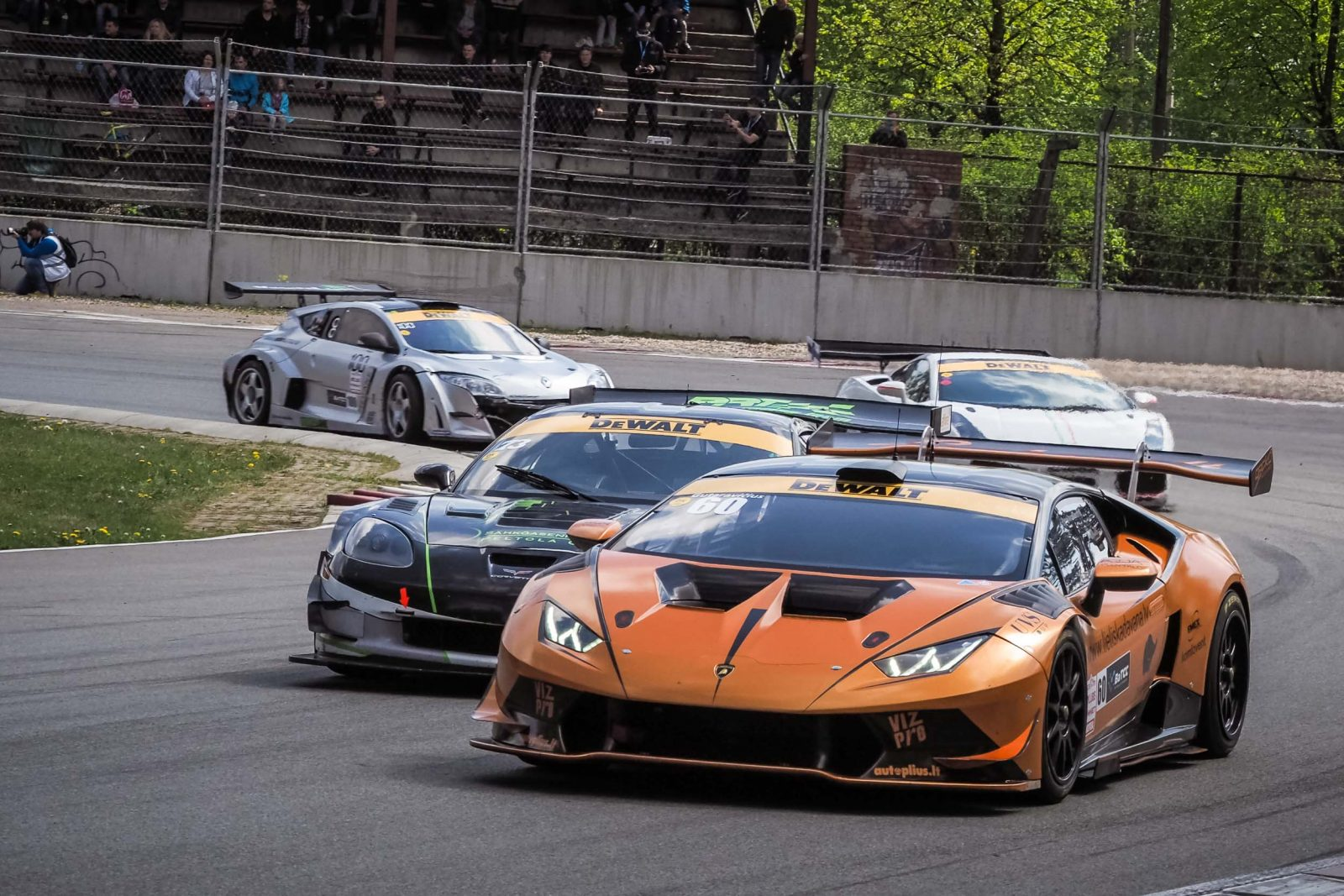
BTC cars in action

The 2019 Baltic Touring Car Championship was the twenty-first Baltic Touring Car Championship season. It began at Biķernieki Complex Sports Base on 10 May and ended at Auto24ring on 22 September.

== Calendar ==
Rnd.		Circuit	Date
1	1	(Latvia) Biķernieki Complex Sports Base, Riga	10–12 May
1	2	(Latvia) Biķernieki Complex Sports Base, Riga	10–12 May
2	3	(Finland) Botniaring Racing Circuit, Jurva	14–16 June
2	4	(Finland) Botniaring Racing Circuit, Jurva	14–16 June
3	5	(Estonia) Auto24ring, Pärnu	28–30 June
3	6	(Estonia) Auto24ring, Pärnu	28–30 June
4	7	(Latvia) Biķernieki Complex Sports Base, Riga	16–18 August
4	8	(Latvia) Biķernieki Complex Sports Base, Riga	16–18 August
5	9	(Estonia) Auto24ring, Pärnu	20–22 September
5	10	(Estonia) Auto24ring, Pärnu	20–22 September

== Teams and drivers ==
=== Baltic GT PRO ===
Team	Car	No.	Drivers	Rounds
(Poland) Maciej Kepka	Porsche 991 GT3 Cup II	2	(Poland) Maciej Kepka	4
(Finland) Jarkko Tähtinen	Ford Mustang	7	(Finland) Jarkko Tähtinen	1
(Finland) Mika Makinen	Mercedes C63 AMG	16	(Finland) Mika Makinen	1
(Finland) Raimo Kesseli	Chevrolet Corvette	22	(Finland) Raimo Kesseli	3
(Finland) Mika Niemelä	BMW M3 E36	41	(Finland) Mika Niemelä	2
(Estonia) EST 1 Racing	Porsche 991 GT3 Cup II	45	(Estonia) Raivo Tamm	1, 3, 5
(Estonia) EST 1 Racing	Porsche 991 GT3 Cup II	46	(Estonia) Oliver Tiirmaa	3, 5
(Finland) Fast Fox Racing	Lamborghini Gallardo	50	(Finland) Marko Rantanen	1
(Finland) Antti Punkari	Chevrolet Camaro	55	(Finland) Antti Punkari	1
(Lithuania) Egidijus Gutaravicius	Lamborghini Huracán Super Trofeo	60	(Lithuania) Egidijus Gutaravicius	1−3, 5
(Latvia) Flash Racing	Lamborghini Huracán Super Trofeo	69	(Latvia) Artūrs Batraks	1, 4−5
(Finland) Jyrki Peltola	Chevrolet Corvette C6	73	(Finland) Jyrki Peltola	1
(Estonia) Rain Pilve	Renault Mégane Trophy I	78	(Estonia) Rain Pilve	3
(Finland) Mika Virtanen	Renault Mégane Trophy II	100	(Finland) Mika Virtanen	1
(Denmark) Frederik Holm	Renault Mégane Trophy II	160	(Denmark) Frederik Holm	3, 5

=== Baltic GT AM ===
Team	Car	No.	Drivers	Rounds
(Lithuania) Porsche Baltic	Porsche Cayman GT4 Clubsport MR	4	(Lithuania) Robertas Kupčikas	1
(Latvia) Jānis Hāns	Subaru Impreza	21	(Latvia) Jānis Hāns	1, 4−5
(Lithuania) Marius Bartkus	Porsche 991 GT3 Cup II	32	(Lithuania) Marius Bartkus	4
(Latvia) Edgars Bundzis	Audi A4	96	(Latvia) Edgars Bundzis	4
(Latvia) Roberts Rode	Nissan 200SX	212	(Latvia) Roberts Rode	1, 3−5
(Lithuania) Urvinis Racing	BMW 316	316	(Lithuania) Marius Dijokas	1−3, 5

=== TCR Sprint ===
Team	Car	No.	Drivers	Rounds
(Finland) Emil Westman	CUPRA León TCR	4	(Finland) Emil Westman	2
(Lithuania) GSR Motorsport	Volkswagen Golf GTI TCR	5	(Lithuania) Ernesta Globytė	1
(Lithuania) GSR Motorsport	Volkswagen Golf GTI TCR	99	(Lithuania) Julius Adomavičius	2−3, 5
(Lithuania) Neste Dream 2 Drive PRO	CUPRA León TCR	99	(Lithuania) Julius Adomavičius	1, 4
(Lithuania) DHL Racing Team	CUPRA León TCR	12	(Lithuania) Jurgis Adomavicius	3
(Lithuania) DHL Racing Team	CUPRA León TCR	15	(Lithuania) Ramūnas Čapkauskas	1−2, 4−5
(Lithuania) DHL Racing Team	Hyundai i30 N TCR	15	(Lithuania) Ramūnas Čapkauskas	3
(Estonia) ALM Motorsport	Honda Civic Type R TCR (FK8)	23	(Estonia) Mattias Vahtel	1−2
(Estonia) ALM Motorsport	Honda Civic Type R TCR (FK8)	44	(Estonia) Robin Vaks	1−2
(Estonia) ALM Motorsport	Honda Civic Type R TCR (FK2)	34	(Estonia) Peeter Peek	1, 3−5
(Lithuania) Mv Sport	Hyundai i30 N TCR	33	(Lithuania) Egidijus Valeisa	1
(Russia) Andrey Yushin	CUPRA León TCR	38	(Russia) Andrey Yushin	All
(Russia) Carville Racing	Volkswagen Golf GTI TCR	91	(Russia) Grigoriy Burlutskiy	5
(Lithuania) Energizer Racing	Volkswagen Golf GTI TCR	95	(Lithuania) Rokas Kvedaras	1
(Lithuania) Noker Racing Team	Volkswagen Golf GTI TCR	911	(Lithuania) Kestutis Stasionis	1−3, 5
(Lithuania) SKUBA Racing Team	Volkswagen Golf GTI TCR	912	(Lithuania) Dziugas Tovilavicius	All

=== BTC1 ===
Team	Car	No.	Drivers	Rounds
(Lithuania) Andrius Keblys	Honda Civic Type R	11	(Lithuania) Andrius Keblys	1–2, 4
(Latvia) Jānis Vanks	Opel Astra	15	(Latvia) Jānis Vanks	1
(Lithuania) Gediminas Vilkas	BMW 123d	17	(Lithuania) Gediminas Vilkas	5
(Lithuania) Julius Skirmantas	Honda Civic Type R	24	(Lithuania) Julius Skirmantas	2, 5
(Lithuania) Paul August	Scion FR-S	25	(Lithuania) Paul August	4
(Lithuania) Marius Miskunas	Honda Civic Type R	88	(Lithuania) Marius Miskunas	1–2, 4
(Lithuania) Tautvydas Andziulevicius	Honda Integra	104	(Lithuania) Tautvydas Andziulevicius	5
(Lithuania) Tadas Petukauskas	Honda Civic Type R	690	(Lithuania) Tadas Petukauskas	4

=== BTC2 ===
Team	Car	No.	Drivers	Rounds
(Lithuania) Vitalijus Parchomenko	SEAT Ibiza	3	(Lithuania) Vitalijus Parchomenko	1, 3–4
(Russia) Casper Racing	SEAT León Supercopa	10	(Russia) Vitalii Chudakov	1
(Russia) Casper Racing	SEAT León Supercopa	35	(Russia) Denis Perlov	1–4
(Russia) Casper Racing	SEAT León Supercopa	51	(Russia) Andrei Ermolov	4–5
(Russia) Casper Racing	SEAT León Supercopa	52	(Russia) Juriy Vikhrov	2, 4–5
(Lithuania) DHL Racing Team	BMW M3	12	(Lithuania) Jurgis Adomavicius	1–2, 4–5
(Lithuania) DHL Racing Team	SEAT Cupra	12	(Lithuania) Jurgis Adomavicius	3
(Poland) Malgorzata Rdest	SEAT León	31	(Poland) Malgorzata Rdest	4
(Finland) Jyrki Jönkkäri	BMW M3	47	(Finland) Jyrki Jönkkäri	All
(Lithuania) Aivaras Remeika	Audi S3	61	(Lithuania) Aivaras Remeika	1, 3
(Poland) Anna Bigos	BMW 330	150	(Poland) Anna Bigos	4

== Calendar and results ==
Rnd.		Circuit	Date	BGT PRO Winner	BGT AM Winner	TCR Winner	BTC1 Winner	BTC2 Winner
1	1	(Latvia) Biķernieki Complex Sports Base, Riga	10–12 May	(Estonia) Raivo Tamm	(Lithuania) Robertas Kupčikas	(Lithuania) Ramūnas Čapkauskas	(Lithuania) Marius Miskunas	(Finland) Jyrki Jonkkari
1	2	(Latvia) Biķernieki Complex Sports Base, Riga	10–12 May	(Latvia) Artūrs Batraks	(Latvia) Roberts Rode	(Lithuania) Ramūnas Čapkauskas	(Lithuania) Marius Miskunas	(Russia) Denis Perlov
2	3	(Finland) Botniaring Racing Circuit, Jurva	14–16 June	(Lithuania) Egidijus Gutaravicius	(Lithuania) Marius Dijokas	(Lithuania) Dziugas Tovilavicius	(Lithuania) Julius Skirmantas	(Russia) Juriy Vikhrov
2	4	(Finland) Botniaring Racing Circuit, Jurva	14–16 June	(Lithuania) Egidijus Gutaravicius	(Lithuania) Marius Dijokas	(Lithuania) Julius Adomavicius	(Lithuania) Julius Skirmantas	(Finland) Jyrki Jonkkari
3	5	(Estonia) Auto24ring, Pärnu	28–30 June	(Estonia) Raivo Tamm	(Latvia) Roberts Rode	(Lithuania) Julius Adomavicius	Not entered	(Finland) Jyrki Jonkkari
3	6	(Estonia) Auto24ring, Pärnu	28–30 June	(Estonia) Raivo Tamm	(Latvia) Roberts Rode	(Lithuania) Dziugas Tovilavicius	Not entered	(Finland) Jyrki Jonkkari
4	7	(Latvia) Biķernieki Complex Sports Base, Riga	16–18 August	(Latvia) Artūrs Batraks	(Latvia) Roberts Rode	(Lithuania) Dziugas Tovilavicius	(Lithuania) Marius Miskunas	(Poland) Malgorzata Rdest
4	8	(Latvia) Biķernieki Complex Sports Base, Riga	16–18 August	(Latvia) Artūrs Batraks	(Latvia) Roberts Rode	(Lithuania) Dziugas Tovilavicius	(Lithuania) Marius Miskunas	(Poland) Malgorzata Rdest
5	9	(Estonia) Auto24ring, Pärnu	20–22 September	(Latvia) Artūrs Batraks	(Latvia) Roberts Rode	(Lithuania) Dziugas Tovilavicius	(Lithuania) Gediminas Vilkas	(Russia) Juriy Vikhrov
5	10	(Estonia) Auto24ring, Pärnu	20–22 September	(Estonia) Raivo Tamm	(Latvia) Roberts Rode	(Lithuania) Dziugas Tovilavicius	(Lithuania) Julius Skirmantas	(Finland) Jyrki Jonkkari

Scoring system

Position	**1st**	**2nd**	**3rd**	**4th**	**5th**	**6th**	**7th**	**8th**	**9th**	**10th**
Race	25	18	15	12	10	8	6	4	2	1

=== Championship standings ===
==== Baltic GT PRO ====
Pos.	Driver	(Latvia) BIK		(Finland) BOT		(Estonia) PÄR		(Latvia) BIK		(Estonia) PÄR		Pts.
1	(Estonia) Raivo Tamm	1	2			1	1			3	1	133
2	(Latvia) Artūrs Batraks	2	1					1	1	1	4	130
3	(Lithuania) Egidijus Gutaravicus	5	3	1	1	3	6			4	3	125
4	(Estonia) Oliver Tiirmaa					2	2			2	2	72
5	(Denmark) Frederik Holm					4	4			5	5	44
6	(Finland) Raimo Kesseli					6	3					23
7	(Estonia) Rain Pilve					5	5					20
8	(Poland) Maciej Kepka							2	Ret			18
9	(Estonia) Jyrki Peltola	3	Ret									15
10	(Finland) Marko Rantanen	4	Ret									12
11	(Finland) Mika Virtanen	Ret	4									12
12	(Finland) Mika Makinen	6	Ret									8
13	(Finland) Antti Punkari	Ret	Ret									0
14	(Finland) Mika Niemelä			Ret	Ret							0
15	(Finland) Jarkko Tähtinen	Ret	DNS									0
Pos.	Driver	(Latvia) BIK		(Finland) BOT		(Estonia) PÄR		(Latvia) BIK		(Estonia) PÄR		Pts.

Colour	Result
Gold	Winner
Silver	Second place
Bronze	Third place
Green	Points classification
Blue	Non-points classification
Blue	Non-classified finish (NC)
Purple	Retired, not classified (Ret)
Red	Did not qualify (DNQ)
Red	Did not pre-qualify (DNPQ)
Black	Disqualified (DSQ)
White	Did not start (DNS)
White	Withdrew (WD)
White	Race cancelled (C)
Blank	Did not practice (DNP)
Blank	Did not arrive (DNA)
Blank	Excluded (EX)

**Bold** – Pole
Italics – Fastest Lap

==== Baltic GT AM ====
Pos.	Driver	(Latvia) BIK		(Finland) BOT		(Estonia) PÄR		(Latvia) BIK		(Estonia) PÄR		Pts.
1	(Latvia) Roberts Rode	2	1			1	1	1	1	1	Ret	168
2	(Lithuania) Marius Dijokas	Ret	Ret	1	1	Ret	2			2	1	111
3	(Latvia) Jānis Hāns	Ret	Ret					2	2	3	2	69
4	(Lithuania) Robertas Kupčikas	1	2									43
5	(Lithuania) Marius Bartkus							3	3			30
6	(Latvia) Marius Bartkus							Ret	4			12
Pos.	Driver	(Latvia) BIK		(Finland) BOT		(Estonia) PÄR		(Latvia) BIK		(Estonia) PÄR		Pts.

==== TCR Sprint ====
Pos.	Driver	(Latvia) BIK		(Finland) BOT		(Estonia) PÄR		(Latvia) BIK		(Estonia) PÄR		Pts.
1	(Lithuania) Dziugas Tovilavicius	4	5	**1**	2	2	1	1	1	3	3	188
2	(Lithuania) Julius Adomavičius	3	2	8	1	**1**	7	2	3	**1**	1	176
3	(Lithuania) Ramunas Capkauskas	1	1	6	6	3	2	4	2	Ret	Ret	129
4	(Russia) Andrey Yushin	7	Ret	7	7	5	4	3	4	5	5	87
5	(Lithuania) Kestutis Stasionis	Ret	7	5	5	7	3			4	4	71
6	(Estonia) Mattias Vahtel	**2**	3	4	4							57
7	(Estonia) Peeter Peek	6	6			4	5	5	5	6	Ret	56
8	(Russia) Grigoriy Burlutskiy									2	2	36
9	(Estonia) Robin Vaks	Ret	DNS	2	3							33
10	(Lithuania) Egidijus Valeisa	5	4									22
11	(Lithuania) Jurgis Adomavicius					6	6					16
12	(Finland) Emil Westman			3	8							15
13	(Lithuania) Rokas Kvedaras	Ret	8									4
14	(Lithuania) Ernesta Globyte	Ret	DNS									0
Pos.	Driver	(Latvia) BIK		(Finland) BOT		(Estonia) PÄR		(Latvia) BIK		(Estonia) PÄR		Pts.

==== BTC1 ====
Pos.	Driver	(Latvia) BIK		(Finland) BOT		(Latvia) BIK		(Estonia) PÄR		Pts.
1	(Lithuania) Marius Miskunas	1	1	2	2	1	1			136
2	(Lithuania) Andrius Keblys	2	2	3	Ret	2	3			84
3	(Lithuania) Julius Skirmantas			1	1			Ret	1	75
4	(Lithuania) Gediminas Vilkas							1	2	43
5	(Lithuania) Tadas Petukauskas					3	2			33
6	(Latvia) Jānis Vanks	3	3							30
7	(Lithuania) Paul August					4	4			24
8	(Lithuania) Tautvydas Andziulevicius							Ret	Ret	0
Pos.	Driver	(Latvia) BIK		(Finland) BOT		(Latvia) BIK		(Estonia) PÄR		Pts.

==== BTC2 ====
Pos.	Driver	(Latvia) BIK		(Finland) BOT		(Estonia) PÄR		(Latvia) BIK		(Estonia) PÄR		Pts.
1	(Finland) Jyrki Jonkkari	1	2	2	1	1	1	2	2	2	1	215
2	(Russia) Denis Perlov	2	1	3	2	2	3	4	3			136
3	(Lithuania) Jurgis Adomavicius	4	Ret	4	4	Ret	2	5	5	4	4	98
4	(Russia) Juriy Vikhrov			1	3			Ret	Ret	1	3	80
5	(Russia) Andrei Ermolov							3	4	3	2	60
6	(Poland) Malgorzata Rdest							1	1			50
7	(Lithuania) Aivaras Remeika	5	Ret			4	4					34
8	(Lithuania) Vitalijus Parchomenko	3	Ret			3	Ret	Ret	Ret			30
9	(Poland) Anna Bigos							6	6			16
10	(Russia) Vitalii Chudakov	Ret	Ret									0
Pos.	Driver	(Latvia) BIK		(Finland) BOT		(Estonia) PÄR		(Latvia) BIK		(Estonia) PÄR		Pts.
