= Ralf Aron =

Estonian racing driver

- Aron at Silverstone Circuit in 2026
- Nationality: (Estonia) Estonian
- Born: 21 March 1998 (age 28) Tallinn, Estonia
- Relatives: Paul Aron (brother)

GT World Challenge Asia career
- Debut season: 2024
- Current team: Climax Racing
- Categorisation: FIA Gold
- Car number: 2
- Starts: 16
- Wins: 1
- Podiums: 3
- Poles: 2
- Fastest laps: 0
- Best finish: 14th in 2024 (Pro-Am)

Previous series
- 2023–24 2016–18 2015 2015 2014 2014 2014 2014: GT World Challenge Europe; FIA F3 European Championship; Italian F4 Championship; ADAC Formula 4 Italian F4 Winter Trophy; Formula Renault 1.6 NEZ; Formula Renault 1.6 Nordic; Formula Renault 1.6 NEC

Championship titles
- 2015 2014: Italian F4 Championship; Italian F4 Winter Trophy

Ralf Aron (born 21 March 1998) is an Estonian racing driver, who currently competes in the GT World Challenge Asia driving for Climax Racing. He is also a Mercedes-AMG factory driver.

== Career ==
Aron competed in the Italian F4 Championship, ADAC Formula 4 and European Formula 3 championships for Prema Powerteam and Hitech GP.

After the conclusion of the 2018 FIA Formula 3 European Championship, Aron retired from racing and moved into a team manager role at Prema. He continued to race sporadically, winning the Palanga 1000 GT race three times and also racing in the Porsche Sprint Challenge NEZ.

=== Sports car racing ===
In 2023, Aron returned to full-time racing for the first time since 2018. Aron pivoted to GT3 racing, signing with Mercedes-AMG to become part of their factory Junior driver lineup. In line with his factory duties, he competed with customer teams Theeba Motorsport and Haupt Racing Team in the GT World Challenge Europe and ADAC GT Masters respectively.

At the ninth hour of the 2026 Bathurst 12 Hour, Aron suffered a high-speed collision with Tsunami RT driver Johannes Zelger. Approaching Turn 17, a typically blind corner at Mount Panorama Circuit, Aron drove at nearly full speed into Zelger, unaware that he was stationary following an earlier incident with Volante Rosso Motorsport driver Damien Hamilton, with the lack of yellow flags present also contributing to the incident. Aron struck Zelger's front end at an impact g-force of 27 g (260 m/s^{2}; 870 ft/s^{2}), resulting in two fractures in his back. He was later transported to Orange Health Service, where he confirmed he was in stable condition and expressed a desire to speak with race officials to help prevent similar accidents in the future. Prior to the crash, Aron had been leading the race for Craft-Bamboo Racing in a Mercedes-AMG GT3 Evo.

== Personal life ==
Aron's younger brother Paul is also a racing driver, who currently serves as a reserve driver for Alpine in Formula One.

== Karting record ==
=== Karting career summary ===
Season	Series	Team	Position
2010	Estonian championship - Raket		1st
2011	Estonian championship - Rotax Junior		6th
2011	Rotax Max Euro Challenge	Aix Racing Team	60th
2012	Estonian Championship - Rotax Junior		1st
2012	Rotax Max Challenge Grand Finals - Junior	Aix Racing Team	51st
2012	Rotax International Open - Junior		30th
2012	Rotax Max Euro Challenge - Junior	Aix Racing	14th
2012	Rotax Max Wintercup - Rotax Max Junior	Aix Racing Team	18th
2013	Rotax Max International Open - Junior		4th
2013	Estonian Championship - Rotax Junior		2nd
2013	CIK-FIA Karting Academy Trophy		9th
2013	CIK-FIA European Championship - KF		41st
2013	Rotax Max Challenge Grand Finals - Junior	AIX Racing	4th
2014	Rotax Max Wintercup - Rotax Max Senior		9th

== Racing record ==
=== Racing career summary ===
Season	Series	Team	Races	Wins	Poles	F/Laps	Podiums	Points	Position
2014	Formula Renault 1.6 NEC	Scuderia Nordica	15	2	0	3	7	263	**2nd**
2014	Formula Renault 1.6 Nordic	Scuderia Nordica	13	5	3	5	5	146	6th
2014	Formula Renault 1.6 NEZ	Scuderia Nordica	7	3	2	3	3	95	**2nd**
2014	Italian F4 Winter Trophy	Prema Powerteam	2	1	2	1	2	N/A	**1st**
2015	Italian F4 Championship	Prema Powerteam	21	9	7	6	13	331	**1st**
2015	ADAC Formula 4 Championship	Prema Powerteam	12	1	0	2	4	120	9th
2016	FIA Formula 3 European Championship	Prema Powerteam	29	1	0	0	2	166	7th
2016–17	MRF Challenge Formula 2000	MRF Racing	12	1	0	3	8	168	5th
2017	FIA Formula 3 European Championship	Hitech GP	30	0	1	1	2	123	9th
2017	Macau Grand Prix	Van Amersfoort Racing	1	0	0	0	1	N/A	**3rd**
2018	FIA Formula 3 European Championship	Prema Theodore Racing	30	4	0	2	8	254.5	6th
2018	Macau Grand Prix	SJM Theodore Racing by Prema	1	0	0	0	0	N/A	6th
2018	Aurum 1006 km - GT	Circle K milesPLUS Racing Team	1	0	0	1	1	N/A	**2nd**
2019	Aurum 1006 km - GT	Circle K milesPLUS Racing Team	1	1	0	0	1	N/A	**1st**
2020	Aurum 1006 km - GT Open	Circle K milesPLUS Racing Team	1	1	1	1	1	N/A	**1st**
2021	Aurum 1006 km - GT Open	Circle K milesPLUS Racing Team	1	1	1	1	1	N/A	**1st**
2022	Aurum 1006 km - GT3	Circle K milesPLUS Racing Team	1	0	1	0	1	N/A	**2nd**
2023	ADAC GT Masters	Haupt Racing Team	12	1	1	2	4	170	**2nd**
2023	GT World Challenge Europe Endurance Cup	Theeba Motorsport	5	0	0	0	0	0	NC
2023	GT World Challenge Europe Endurance Cup - Bronze Cup	Theeba Motorsport	5	0	0	0	0	6	30th
2024	GT World Challenge Asia	Climax Racing	10	0	1	?	1	34	20th
2024	Nürburgring Langstrecken-Serie - SP9	Team ADVAN x HRT	3	3	3	3	3	22*	3rd*
2024	Nürburgring Langstrecken-Serie - SP9	Mercedes-AMG Team Landgraf						22*	3rd*
2024	24 Hours of Nürburgring - SP9 Pro-Am	Team ADVAN x HRT	1	0	0	0	0	N/A	5th
2024	Intercontinental GT Challenge	Team ADVAN x HRT	1	0	0	0	0	0	NC
2024	Intercontinental GT Challenge	Mercedes-AMG Team GruppeM Racing	1	0	0	0	0	0	NC
2024	GT World Challenge Europe Endurance Cup	Mercedes-AMG Team GruppeM Racing	1	0	0	0	0	0	NC
2024	GT World Challenge Europe Endurance Cup	Boutsen VDS	1	0	0	0	0	0	NC
2024	FIA GT World Cup	TORO Racing	1	0	0	0	0	N/A	12th
2024–25	Asian Le Mans Series - GT	Climax Racing	6	0	1	0	0	26	14th
2025	IMSA SportsCar Championship - GTD	Lone Star Racing	1	0	0	0	0	193	79th
2025	GT World Challenge Asia	Climax Racing	8	0	1	0	2	33	18th
2025	Nürburgring Langstrecken-Serie - SP9	Mercedes-AMG Team GetSpeed							
2025	24 Hours of Nürburgring - SP9 Pro	Mercedes-AMG Team GetSpeed	1	0	0	0	0	N/A	6th
2025	International GT Open	GetSpeed	14	0	0	1	0	19	15th
2026	IMSA SportsCar Championship - GTD	Lone Star Racing	1	0	0	0	0	273	63rd
2026	Intercontinental GT Challenge	Mercedes-AMG Team Craft-Bamboo Racing	1	0	0	0	0	0	NC
2026	Nürburgring Langstrecken-Serie - SP9	Mercedes-AMG Team Ravenol	1	1	1	0	1	10	NC†
2026	European Le Mans Series - LMGT3	Team Qatar by Iron Lynx	2	1	2	0	1	31	12th
2026	GT World Challenge Europe Endurance Cup	Mercedes-AMG Team GetSpeed	1	1	0	0	1	0	NC†
2026	Shanghai 8 Hours	Tarmac by Climax Racing	1	0	1	0	1	N/A	**3rd**

^{*} Season still in progress.

=== Complete Formula Renault 1.6 NEC results ===
(key) (Races in bold indicate pole position) (Races in italics indicate fastest lap)

Year	Team	1	2	3	4	5	6	7	8	9	10	11	12	13	14	15	DC	Points
2014	Scuderia Nordica	ZAN1; 1; 8	ZAN1; 2; 5	SPA1; 1; 8	SPA1; 2; 7	NÜR; 1; 7	NÜR; 2; 8	ASS; 1; 2	ASS; 2; 1	ZOL; 1; 3	ZOL; 2; 2	SPA2; 1; 2	SPA2; 2; 1	ZAN2; 1; 5	ZAN2; 2; 6	ZAN2; 3; 2	2nd	263

=== Complete Formula Renault 1.6 Nordic results ===
(key) (Races in bold indicate pole position) (Races in italics indicate fastest lap)

Year	Team	1	2	3	4	5	6	7	8	9	10	11	12	13	14	15	16	17	DC	Points
2014	Scuderia Nordica	KAR; 1; 10	KAR; 2; 13	BOT; 1; 6	BOT; 2; 9	BOT; 3; 1	FAL; 1	FAL; 2	FAL; 3	FAL; 4	AUD; 1; 8	**AUD**; **2**; 6	KNU; 1 Ret	KNU; 2 Ret	SOL; 1; 1	**SOL**; **2**; 1	**MAN**; **1**; 1	**MAN**; **2**; 1	6th	146

=== Complete Italian F4 Championship results ===
(key) (Races in bold indicate pole position) (Races in italics indicate fastest lap)

Year	Team	1	2	3	4	5	6	7	8	9	10	11	12	13	14	15	16	17	18	19	20	21	DC	Points
2015	Prema Powerteam	**VLL**; **1**; 1	VLL; 2; 11	VLL; 3; 1	MNZ; 1; 3	MNZ; 2; 6	MNZ; 3; 2	**IMO1**; **1**; 1	IMO1; 2; 15	**IMO1**; **3**; 1	**MUG**; **1**; 1	MUG; 2; 11	**MUG**; **3**; 1	ADR; 1; 3	ADR; 2; 6	ADR; 3; 2	**IMO2**; **1**; 1	IMO2; 2; 4	**IMO2**; **3**; 1	MIS; 1; 1	MIS; 2 Ret	MIS; 3; 20	1st	331

=== Complete ADAC Formula 4 Championship results ===
(key) (Races in bold indicate pole position) (Races in italics indicate fastest lap)

Year	Team	1	2	3	4	5	6	7	8	9	10	11	12	13	14	15	16	17	18	19	20	21	22	23	24	DC	Points
2015	Prema Powerteam	OSC; 1; 2	OSC; 2; 3	OSC; 3; 4	RBR; 1; 2	RBR; 2 Ret	RBR; 3 Ret	SPA; 1; 6	SPA; 2; 4	SPA; 3 Ret	LAU; 1	LAU; 2	LAU; 3	NÜR; 1; 7	NÜR; 2; 7	NÜR; 3; 1	SAC; 1	SAC; 2	SAC; 3	OSC; 1	OSC; 2	OSC; 3	HOC; 1	HOC; 2	HOC; 3	9th	120

=== Complete FIA Formula 3 European Championship results ===
(key) (Races in bold indicate pole position) (Races in italics indicate fastest lap)

Year	Entrant	Engine	1	2	3	4	5	6	7	8	9	10	11	12	13	14	15	16	17	18	19	20	21	22	23	24	25	26	27	28	29	30	DC	Points
2016	Prema Powerteam	Mercedes	LEC; 1; 7	LEC; 2 Ret	LEC; 3; 7	HUN; 1; 1	HUN; 2; 2	HUN; 3 DNS	PAU; 1; 13	PAU; 2; 6	PAU; 3; 15	RBR; 1; 9	RBR; 2; 12	RBR; 3; 9	NOR; 1; 4	NOR; 2; 10	NOR; 3; 9	ZAN; 1; 14	ZAN; 2; 6	ZAN; 3; 8	SPA; 1; 8	SPA; 2; 14	SPA; 3; 13	NÜR; 1; 6	NÜR; 2; 4	NÜR; 3; 14	IMO; 1; 7	IMO; 2; 4	IMO; 3; 4	HOC; 1; 4	HOC; 2; 5	HOC; 3; 8	7th	166
2017	Hitech GP	Mercedes	SIL; 1 Ret	SIL; 2; 16	SIL; 3; 10	MNZ; 2; 8	MNZ; 2; 9	MNZ; 3; 8	PAU; 1; 5	PAU; 2; 5	PAU; 3; 3	HUN; 1 Ret	HUN; 2; 12	HUN; 3; 13	NOR; 1; 9	**NOR**; **2**; 5	NOR; 3; 4	SPA; 1; 11	SPA; 2; 8	SPA; 3; 7	ZAN; 1 Ret	ZAN; 2; 10	ZAN; 3; 8	NÜR; 1; 14	NÜR; 2; 5	NÜR; 3; 3	RBR; 1; 12	RBR; 2; 6	RBR; 3; 18†	HOC; 1; 8	HOC; 2; 10	HOC; 3; 19	9th	123
2018	Prema Theodore Racing	Mercedes	PAU; 1; 2	PAU; 2; 8	PAU; 3; 1‡	HUN; 1; 5	HUN; 2; 12	HUN; 3; 7	NOR; 1; 2	NOR; 2; 13	NOR; 3; 6	ZAN; 1; 1	ZAN; 2; 1	ZAN; 3; 14	SPA; 1; 3	SPA; 2 Ret	SPA; 3; 14	SIL; 1 Ret	SIL; 2; 10	SIL; 3 Ret	MIS; 1; 7	MIS; 2; 5	MIS; 3; 1	NÜR; 1; 5	NÜR; 2; 5	NÜR; 3; 8	RBR; 1; 23	RBR; 2; 5	RBR; 3; 9	HOC; 1; 6	HOC; 2; 3	HOC; 3; 15	6th	242.5

^{†} Driver did not finish the race, but was classified as he completed over 90% of the race distance.
^{‡} Half points awarded as less than 75% of race distance was completed.

=== Complete Macau Grand Prix results ===
Year	Team	Car	Qualifying	Quali Race	Main race
2017	(Netherlands) Van Amersfoort Racing	Dallara F317	17th	13th	**3rd**
2018	(Italy) SJM Theodore Racing by Prema	Dallara F317	10th	9th	6th

=== Complete GT World Challenge Europe Endurance Cup results ===
(Races in bold indicate pole position) (Races in italics indicate fastest lap)

Year	Team	Car	Class	1	2	3	4	5	6	7	Pos.	Points
2023	Theeba Motorsport	Mercedes-AMG GT3 Evo	Bronze	MNZ; 38	LEC; 43†	SPA; 6H; 52	SPA; 12H; 60†	SPA; 24H; Ret	NÜR; 29	CAT; 36	30th	6
2024	Mercedes-AMG Team GruppeM Racing	Mercedes-AMG GT3 Evo	Pro	LEC	SPA; 6H; 12	SPA; 12H; 36	SPA; 24H; Ret	NÜR	MNZ		NC	0
2024	Boutsen VDS	Mercedes-AMG GT3 Evo	Pro							JED; 12	NC	0
2026	Mercedes-AMG Team GetSpeed	Mercedes-AMG GT3 Evo	Pro	LEC	MNZ	SPA; 6H	SPA; 12H	SPA; 24H	NÜR	ALG; 1	NC‡	0‡

=== Complete ADAC GT Masters results ===
(key) (Races in bold indicate pole position) (Races in italics indicate fastest lap)

Year	Team	Car	1	2	3	4	5	6	7	8	9	10	11	12	DC	Points
2023	Haupt Racing Team	Mercedes-AMG GT3 Evo	HOC; 1; 7	HOC; 2; 9	NOR; 1; 4	NOR; 2; 5	NÜR; 1; 2	NÜR; 2; 10	SAC; 1; 4	SAC; 2; 3^{3}	RBR; 1; 4^{2}	RBR; 2; 7	HOC; 1; 2^{2}	**HOC**; **2**; 1^{1}	2nd	170

=== Complete IMSA SportsCar Championship results ===
(key) (Races in bold indicate pole position; results in italics indicate fastest lap)

Year	Team	Class	Make	Engine	1	2	3	4	5	6	7	8	9	10	Pos.	Points
2025	Lone Star Racing	GTD	Mercedes-AMG GT3 Evo	Mercedes-AMG M159 6.2 L V8	DAY; 13	SEB	LBH	LGA	WGL	MOS	ELK	VIR	IMS	PET	79th	193
2026	Lone Star Racing	GTD	Mercedes-AMG GT3 Evo	Mercedes-AMG M159 6.2 L V8	DAY; 6	SEB	LBH	LGA	WGL	MOS	ELK	VIR	IMS	PET	63rd	273

=== Complete European Le Mans Series results ===
(key) (Races in bold indicate pole position; results in italics indicate fastest lap)

Year	Entrant	Class	Chassis	Engine	1	2	3	4	5	6	Rank	Points
2026	Team Qatar by Iron Lynx	LMGT3	Mercedes-AMG GT3 Evo	Mercedes-AMG M159 6.2 L V8	CAT	LEC	IMO	SPA	**SIL**; 1	**ALG**; 8	12th	31

Sporting positions
Preceded by Lance Stroll	Italian Formula 4 Championship; Champion; 2015	Succeeded by Marcos Siebert
