= Isomäki (disambiguation) =

Isomäki is a Finnish surname.

Isomäki may also refer to:

- Isomäki Areena, an ice hockey arena in Pori, Finland
- Isomäki (Pori), a district of Pori, Finland
