= Legends Road Course World Finals =

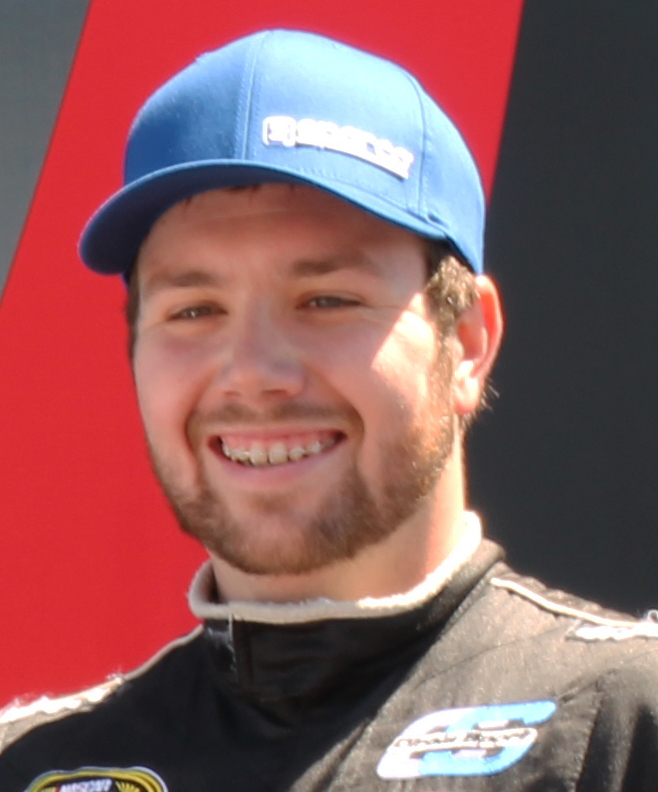
2009 winner Alex Kennedy (pictured in 2015)

INEX Legends Road Course World Finals is an annual automobile race for Legends cars.

Drivers are divided into four divisions; Pro, Semi-Pro, Masters and Young Lions. This INEX event brings in a diverse group of drivers from across the world. Countries that have participated in these events have come from countries like South Africa, Italy, Finland, Australia and the UK.

== Champions ==
Year	Venue	Champion							
Year	Venue	Pro	Semi-Pro	Masters	Young Lions	Thunder Roadster	Bandolero	Bandits	Outlaw
1997	?	Ryan Hampton	?	?	Not held				
1998	?	Ryan Hampton	?	Stuart Forbes-Robinson	Not held				
1999	?	Tick Steward	?	(Oklahoma) Mike Samis	Not held				
2000	(California) Sonoma	Jimmy Adams	Dustin Bly	Mike Dillard	Not held				
2001	?	(United Kingdom) John Mickel	?	Bruce Perry	Not held				
2002	(California) Sonoma	(Oklahoma) Mike Samis	Craig Lewis	(New Mexico) Robert Gayton	Not held				
2003	(California) Sonoma	(United Kingdom) John "Jon" Higgins	(United Kingdom) Derek Pierce	(New Mexico) Robert Gayton	Not held				
2004	(California) Sonoma	(Nevada) Scott Sheldon	(Nevada) Dustin Ash	(Oklahoma) Bob Christensen	Not held				
2005	(California) Sonoma	(Oklahoma) Corey Christensen	(North Carolina) Robert Hall	(New Mexico) Robert Gayton	Not held	(California) Randy Raduechel			
2006	(California) Sonoma	(Virginia) Michael Bryant	(Spain) Carlos Sedano	(United Kingdom) Peter Morton	Not held				
2007	(California) Sonoma	(Finland) Rory Penttinen	(United Kingdom) Glenn Burtenshaw	(Finland) Jussi Rasku	Not held	Steve Cantrell			
2008	(Nevada) Las Vegas	(Nevada) Jeremiah Wagner	(Texas) Bryce Walker	(New Mexico) Robert Gayton	Not held	Dustin Ash	Amanda Gubler		
2009	(Nevada) Las Vegas	(New Mexico) Alex Kennedy	(Virginia) Jake Morris	(California) Gary Scheuerell	(New Mexico) Justin Irwin	(California) Randy Raduechel			
2010	(California) Sonoma	(North Carolina) Steven Cantrell	(Nevada) Spencer Gallagher	(Washington (state)) Kirk Hall	(New Mexico) Isaac Sherman				
2011	(California) Sonoma	(California) Frankie Marks	(North Carolina) Zack Skolnick	(Finland) Marko Mankonen	(Arizona) Kyle Niquette	(California) Robert Raduechel			
2012	(Nevada) Las Vegas	(New Mexico) Jason Irwin	(California) Jonathan St. Ours	(Nevada) George Sheldon Sr.	(New York (state)) Aidan Landauer	Shaun Polack	(Nevada) Caden Carlin		
2013	(Nevada) Las Vegas	(Kentucky) Tyler Green	(California) Jonathan St Ours	(New Mexico) Robert Gayton	(Nevada) Payton Saxton	Shaun Polack	(Nevada) Caden Carlin		
2014	(Virginia) Alton	(South Africa) Devin Robertson	(Pennsylvania) Matt Kurzejewski	(Washington (state)) Randy Schaaf	(North Carolina) Carson Ferguson			Kade Lambert	(North Carolina) Ashton Higgins
2015	(New Hampshire) Loudon	(Sweden) Emil Persson	(Connecticut) Devin O'Connell	(United Kingdom) John Mickel	(New York (state)) Edward Fatscher IV		Casey Call		
2016	(Virginia) Dominion	(Sweden) Emil Persson	(Finland) Mathias Hertén	(Sweden) Christer Lindholm	(New York (state)) Edward Fatscher IV			Jake Waltman	Mason Magee
2017	(Finland) Botniaring	(Sweden) Emil Persson	(Finland) Philip Miemois	(Finland) Pekka Lehtola					
2018	(Nevada) Las Vegas	Ramus Ericsson	(North Carolina) Connor Mosack	(New Mexico) Robert Gayton	(California) Jesse Love				
2019	(Georgia (U.S. state)) Dawsonville	(Georgia (U.S. state)) Sean Rayhall	(Italy) Kevin Liguori	(New Hampshire) Shaun Buffington	(North Carolina) Cameron Bolin				
