= Kačerginė =

- Town
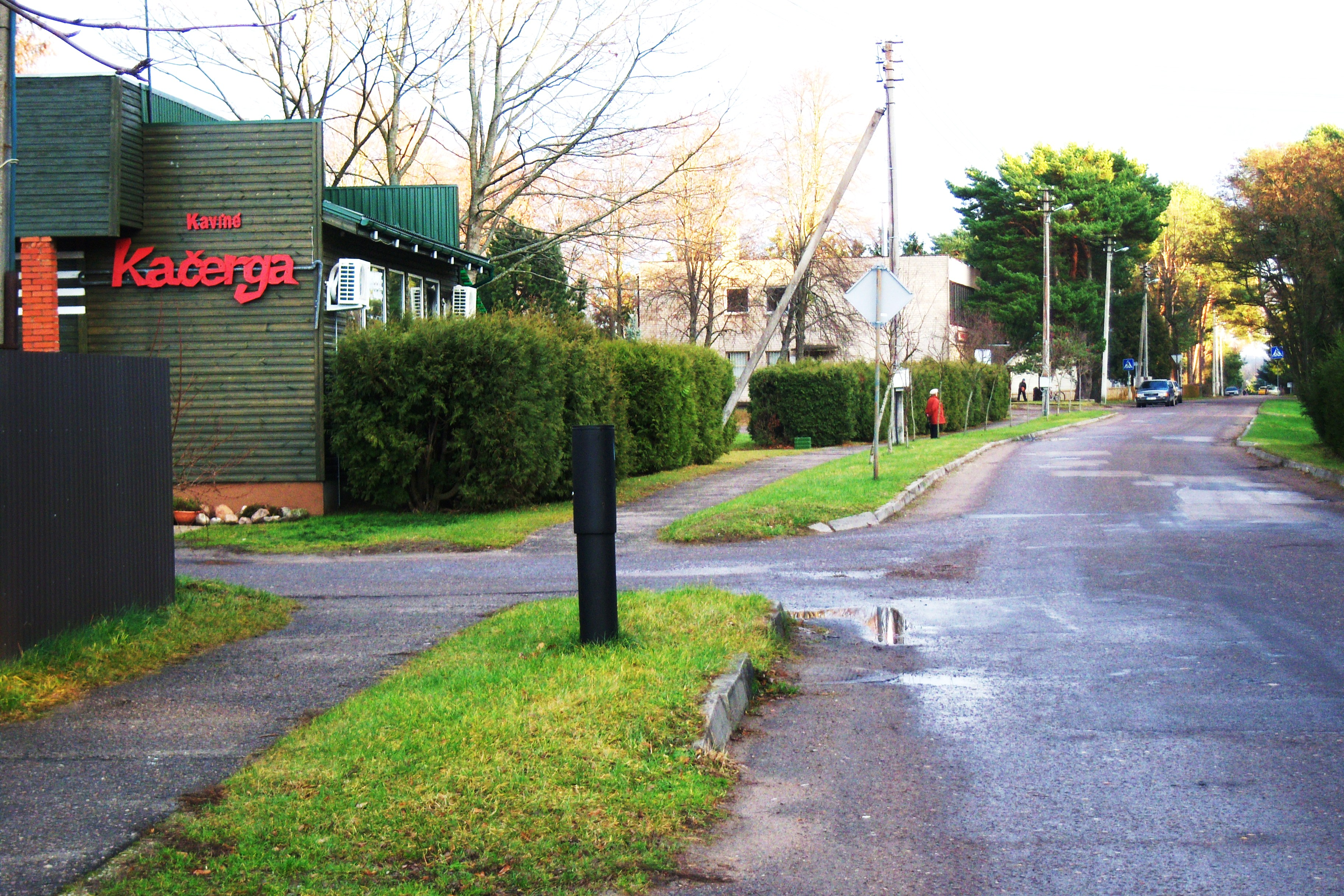
- Main street

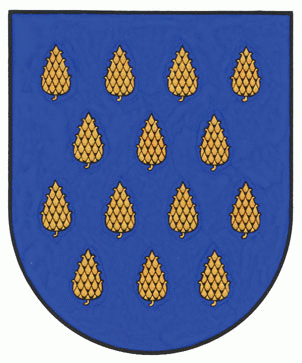
- Coat of arms

- Location in Lithuania
- Coordinates: 54°56′0″N 23°43′10″E
- Country: Lithuania
- Ethnographic region: Aukštaitija
- County: Kaunas County

Population (2015)
  - Total: 790
- Time zone: UTC+2 (EET)
  - Summer (DST): UTC+3 (EEST)

Kačerginė is a small town 16 km (9.9 mi) west of Kaunas. The town of Kačerginė is located in Kaunas County, central Lithuania. Kačerginė was officially proclaimed a health resort in 1933. Nemuno Žiedas, the only motor racing circuit in Lithuania, was opened in 1960. As of 2024, it had a population of 900
