= Nemuno Žiedas =

Motorsport circuit in Lithuania

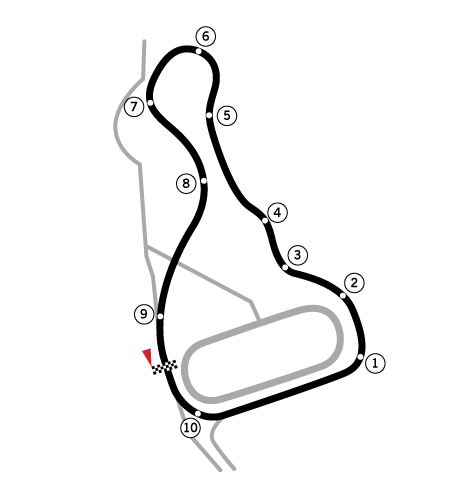
- Location: Kačerginė, Lithuania
- Coordinates: 54°54′58″N 23°42′30″E
- Opened: 1960
- Major events: BaTCC
- Length: 3.301 km (2.051 miles)
- Turns: 10
- Race lap record: 1:06:337 (Gediminas Bakšys, Nissan 180SX, 2025, BGT PRO)

Nemuno Žiedas is a motor racing circuit in Kačerginė, a small town near Kaunas, Lithuania opened in 1960. Lithuanian and Baltic Touring Car Championship rounds are held in Nemuno Žiedas, as well as many professional and amateur events.

The revamp of the track in 2003 was made with consultancy of Marcel Martin, one of the most respected circuit specialists from the FIA. Two years later he confirmed many positive changes in attempt to ensure the safety of the competitors and spectators.

The circuit is still considered as a low category venue, with many corners being unsafe due to the lack of gravel traps, armco and poor surface. The frequent accidents of cars and especially motorbikes that led to serious injuries further hurt the reputation of the Lithuanian race track.

On 20th of September 2020, Arūnas Gečiauskas beat touring car record of the track by making it in 1:09:943

On 2nd of August 2025, driver Gediminas Bakšys set a new lap record at Nemuno žiedas with a time of 1:06.337, breaking the previous benchmark.
