= Legends car racing =

Motor racing series based on 1930s and 1940s American automobiles

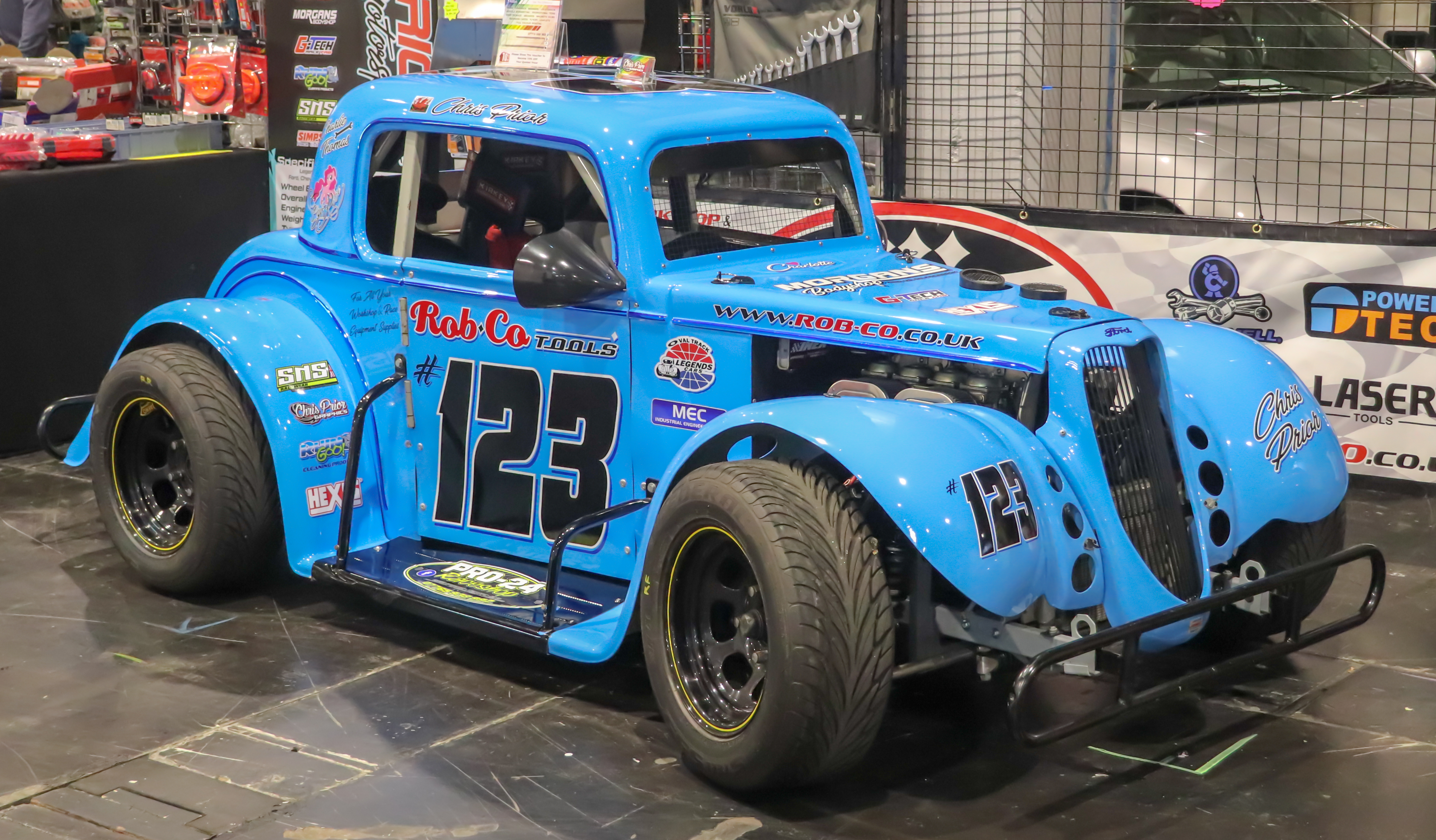
Legends car based on Ford coupé 1934

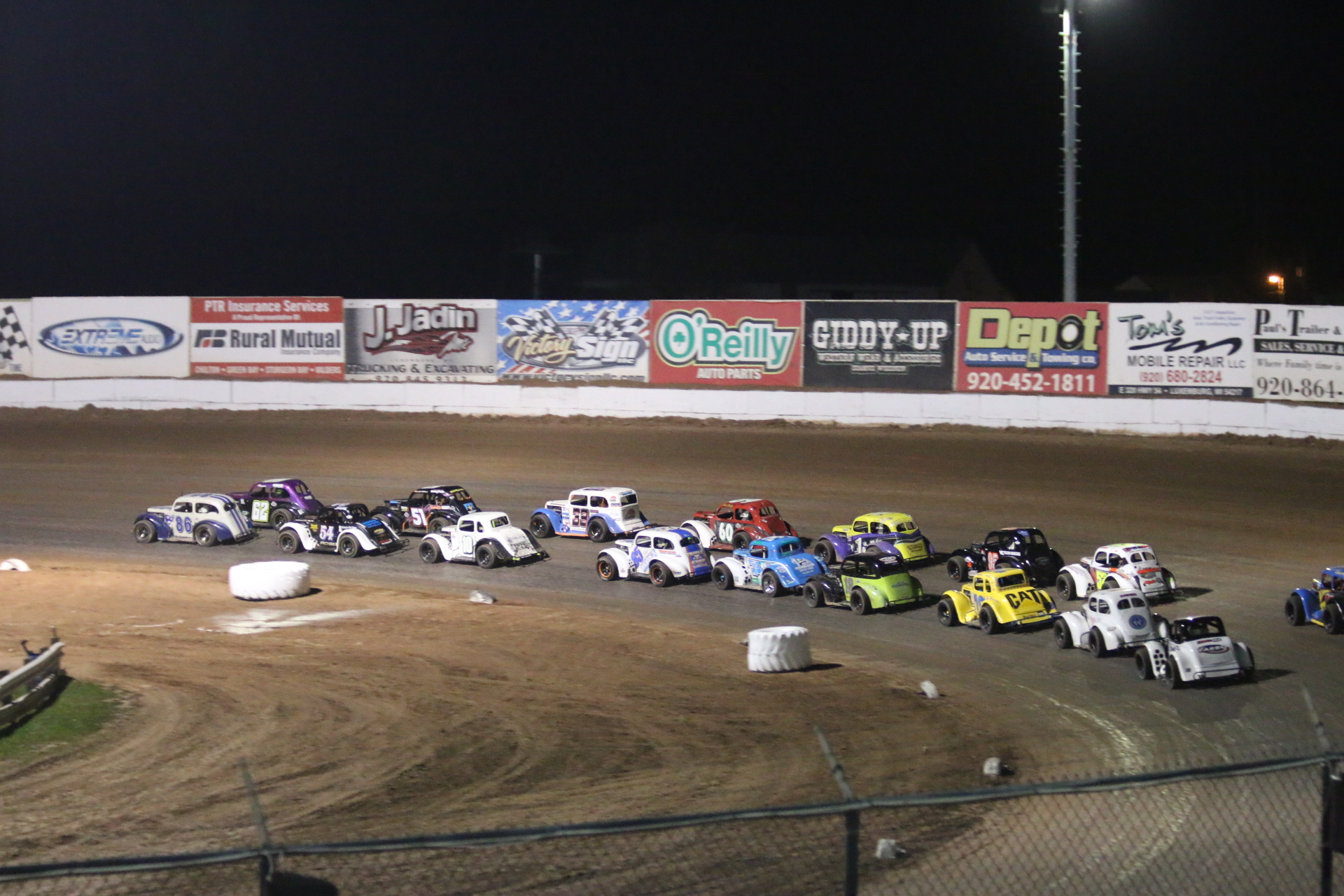
U.S. Legends 2016 Dirt Nationals at 141 Speedway

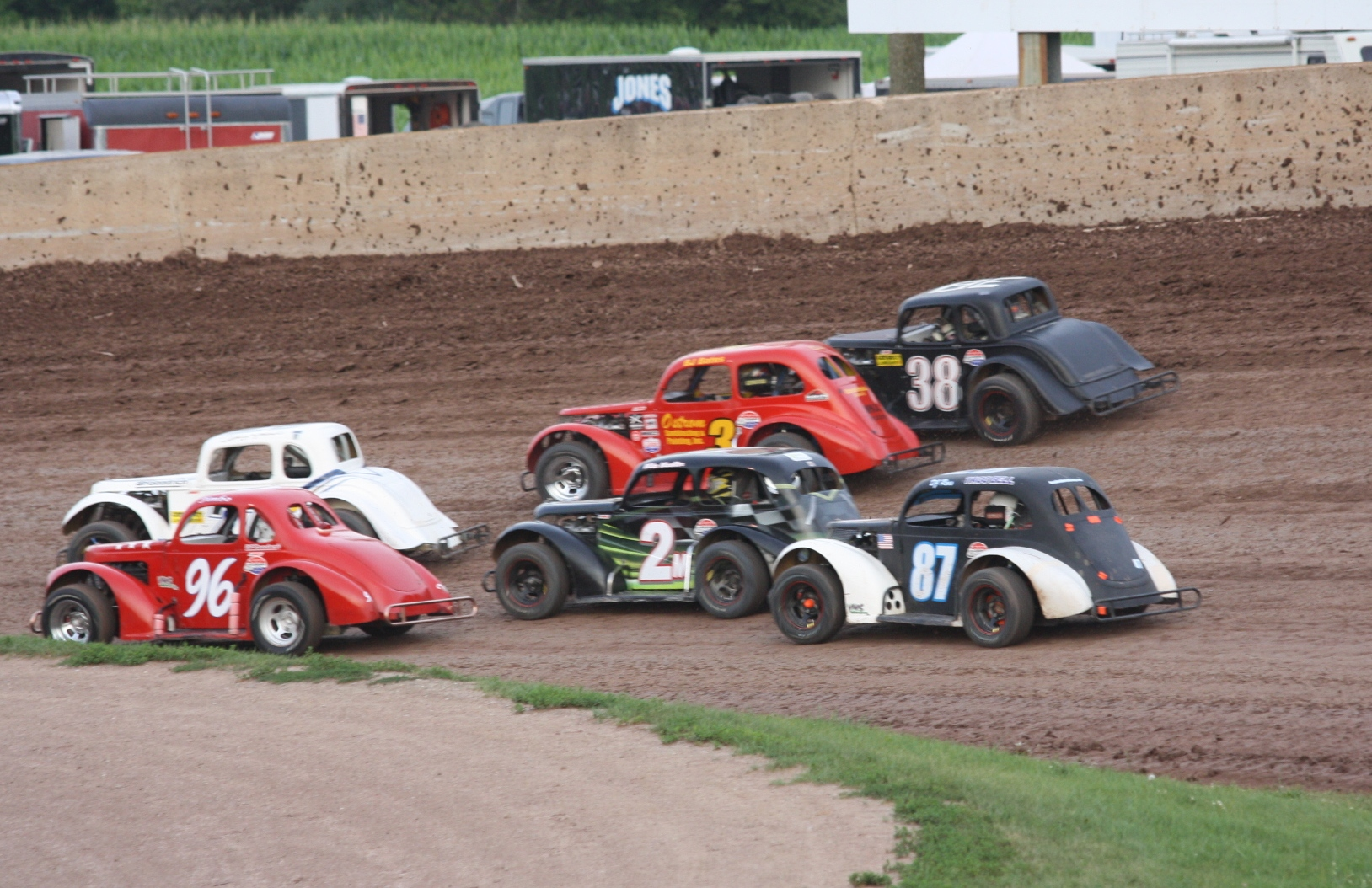
Racing on Beaver Dam Raceway dirt track

Legends car racing is a style of auto racing designed primarily to promote exciting racing and to keep costs down (as of 2022, a brand-new Legends car could be purchased in the USA for $17,500 USD). The race car bodyshells are 5/8-scale replicas of American automobiles from the 1930s and 1940s, powered by Yamaha XJ1250, FJ1200 (both air-cooled) or, starting in 2018, FZ-09 (water-cooled) engines. The worldwide sanctioning body for legends car racing is INEX.

Legends cars are a "spec" series, meaning all cars are mechanically identical, with the exception of three styles of car (standard coupe, '34 coupe, and sedan) available with 10 types of body styles. New cars are currently offered with seven body styles, however many used cars exist with the "older" styles.

They are raced on dirt tracks, oval tracks, and road circuits.

== History ==
In 1992, Charlotte Motor Speedway officials noticed a need for lower cost racing cars with little maintenance time and cost. They found such a car existed, in the guise of the motorcycle-engined dwarf car, a 5/8-scale, steel-bodied and fenderless 1935 Ford coupé, which was being manufactured by the Dwarf Car Company in Phoenix, Arizona. As the coupé concept was not exactly in line in what they were looking for, and deeming steel replacement bodywork too costly, they adapted the dwarf car concept to fit their needs, creating cars resembling those of the 1930s and 1940s which competed in the early NASCAR modified tour races. To this day, the primary difference between the two cars is the legends have fenders over the tires, whereas the dwarfs have no fenders. The first legends car was unveiled in April 1992 by track president and general manager Humpy Wheeler and road racer Elliott Forbes-Robinson. Legends cars are produced by US Legend Cars in Harrisburg, North Carolina. They are the largest mass-producer of race cars in the world.

== Legends car racing around the world ==
Although the cars originated from the US, other countries including Canada and many European countries also host championships. Each November, the world finals are held in the US, with the exception of 2017, when the finals were held in Finland, at the Botniaring Racing Circuit.

=== United States ===
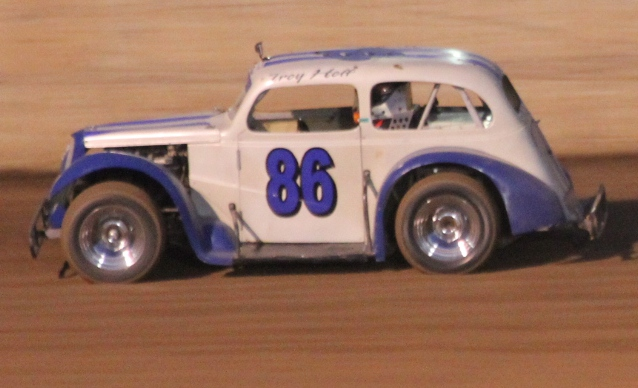
2013 US Dirt Nationals Young Lions champion Troy Hoff

Drivers can be classified into four different divisions. The Pro Division is for the experienced drivers. The Masters Division features drivers 40 years and older. The Semi-Pro Division is for drivers with less than two years of experience in a legends, featuring the drivers that are new to the INEX legends car or have been inactive in other forms of racing for a while. There is also the Young Lions Division, which is designated for drivers between the ages of 12 and 16. There are separate nationals for dirt and asphalt cars.

Legends car drivers who have raced in NASCAR include Brennan Poole, Chris Buescher, Ryan Blaney, Reed Sorenson, David Ragan, Joey Logano, Zane Smith, Bubba Wallace, Kyle Busch, and Kurt Busch.

=== United Kingdom ===
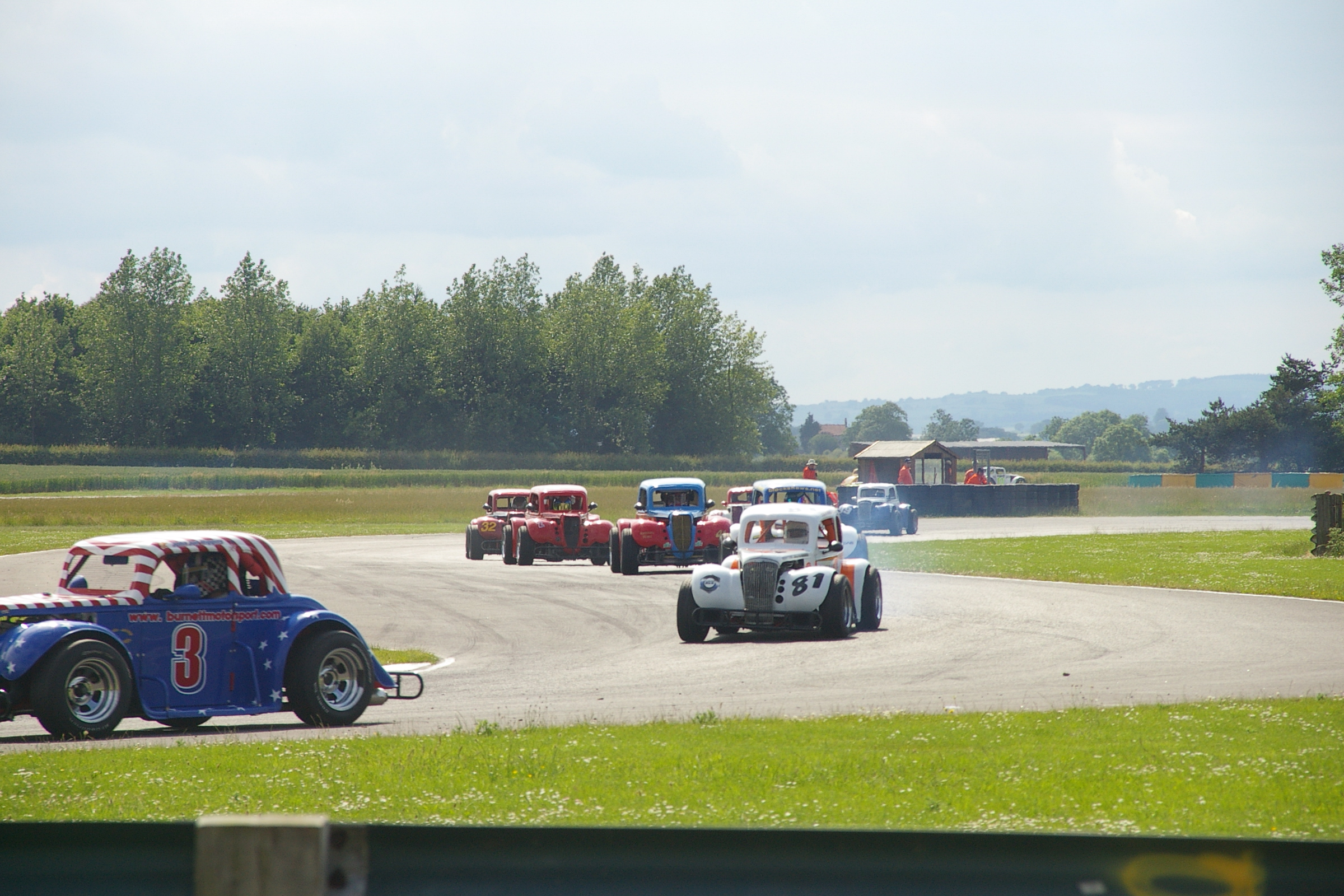
Legends Racing UK at Croft Circuit

Running since 1996, Legends Racing UK visits tracks all over the country, and ran a 15-round championship, all brought to the UK by music promoter Phil Cooper.

Three races are held – two heats and a final – at a round of the championship, with the heats lasting between 7 and 12 laps depending on the circuit, with the final a few laps longer. The grid for race one is drawn by lots, with the reverse for heat two, and in the final the grid is formed by the reverse of the drivers points in the previous two races – meaning the most successful driver starts near the back. In each race however, all rookies start at the back of the grid.

In 2018, Team 247, a race team set up by engineering firm 24hr Solutions, with rookie driver Phil Turner (Hertfordshire), entered the competition in support of Help for Heroes. With racing and event dates across the country, the Team 247 brand was built on the legends racing platform.

Historically, legends racers from the UK have performed well at the world finals, winning Semi-pro (Glenn Burtenshaw), Pro (John Jon Higgins) and Masters divisions (Peter Morton).

==== Scotland ====
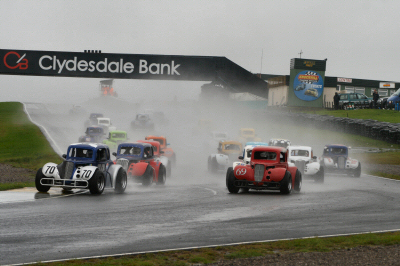
Scottish legends championship race start at Knockhill

Brought to Scotland by Aly Hunter, and with only six cars taking to the grid in April 2000 at Knockhill, it is now the norm to find around 20 cars taking part, with 25 competing in the support races at the 2007 BTCC meeting. All the races in 2007 took place at Knockhill, but the series has organised "away" rounds at Croft, Oulton Park, Donington Park, Cadwell Park and Anglesey in recent years. The series observes the same race format rules as the UK legends, however the races are 8 and 10 laps long for the heats and finals respectively.

Legends are available for race or track hire at Knockhill.

=== Northern Europe ===
Legends have been racing in Finland since 1999 and the Legends Trophy series have existed since 2000. The first cars came to Finland from defunct Swedish series. Since then, over 60 cars have been imported to Finland. Legends is currently the most popular racing class in Finland with over 40 cars in the grid regularly. In 2010 Seinäjoen Vauhtiajot street racing event saw the record breaking 54 legends cars in the entry list.

The most successful racer in Finland is Pasi Matintupa, who won the trophy three times, in 2005–2007. In 2007 Rory Penttinen won the legends car world finals at Infineon Raceway in the pro class.

There is also an ice racing series for legends cars in Finland. Earlier legends have been raced in rallycross and rally sprinting.

Legends Cars Baltic racing run a FIA Northern European Zone championship consisting of racers from Finland, Sweden, Russia and Baltics. In 2016, the series was won by Marko Kilpiä. More than 50 racers participated in three events. Series will continue in 2017 with round in Riga, Parnu and Ahvenisto.

=== Western Europe ===
Legends have been raced in France since 2004. and have supported the French Grand Prix at Magny Cours; also in Belgium and Spain.

In Italy more than 80 legends cars have been sold, and the official Italian championship counts up to 30 drivers per event. The Italian team regularly takes part in the world finals, winning the Semi-pro Legends Road Course World Final in 2019 with the driver Kevin Liguori.

The Italian former World Cup Alpine ski racer Kristian Ghedina took part in the 2021 Legend Cars Italian Championship.

Since 2020, there has been a Legends Car Ice Challenge which is held in various Italian famous ski resorts during the winter season

=== Mexico ===
A legends racing series has been announced in Mexico for 2009, consolidating a true ladder system for the NASCAR Corona Series. The series is open for drivers 12 years and older, and is marketed as being the step before the NASCAR Mexico T4 Series.

=== Georgia ===
In 2012, a legends national championship started in the Republic of Georgia at the rebuilt Rustavi International Motorpark, 10 km from the country's capital of Tbilisi. The 2012 season consisted of eight races for the championship of Georgia and one international race where 18 drivers from Georgia, Russia, Belarus and Germany took part. For the 2015 season, seven races are scheduled from April until November.

=== Australia ===
For a number of years legends raced on Australian oval tracks, surviving as a minor category, as the popularity of oval track racing "down under" is not what it is in the United States. Legends cars have been popular as a speedway category racing on dirt and clay ovals running on midget and sprint car meets, but also briefly became a tarmac category, racing as a support category with the Australian NASCAR series, mainly racing on the Calder Park Thunderdome superspeedway (something that the Legends Cars do not race, as they typically are on smaller ovals and road courses).

Phil Ward, a former touring car racer, recognized the potential for this type of economical racer, and developed the Aussie racing car, with a focus on road racing. The Aussie racing cars retain the same Yamaha motorcycle engines. The classic legends style bodyshape of old Fords and early Holdens have been gradually supplanted by imitations of modern road cars for commercial purposes. The category has visited many of the major Supercars Championship races across Australia. While high grid numbers have long been a feature of the class, calendars have fluctuated wildly as category management has clashed with event promoters. Another very similar category Future Racers also emerged during the 2000s technically very similar although the bodywork was more sportscar in nature.

In recent years, the international Legends category has re-emerged as a grassroots tarmac racing category on road courses, sanctioned by the Australian Auto Sport Alliance rather than the FIA-affiliated Motorsport Australia.

== Legends Big Money 100 at Charlotte ==
On January 22, 2010, it was announced that US Legend Cars International would host a million dollar purse race at Charlotte Motor Speedway, from July 15–17, 2010. Three hundred one legends cars were on hand for the inaugural "Legends Million" event. The event was televised live on Speed Channel with Daniel Hemric of Kannapolis, North Carolina, taking the top prize of $250,000.

The event was hosted again at Charlotte Motor Speedway under the name of the "Legends Big Money 100" from 1–2 August 2011. The winner was Kyle Plott of Marietta, Georgia. He held off NASCAR driver David Ragan, a past legends car and bandolero champion, to win the 100-lap race at Charlotte.

The third annual Big Money 100 was once again hosted at Charlotte Motor Speedway on 4 July 2012. Tyler Green won the 100-lap feature.

Car specifications

- Wheelbase: 73.00 in (1,854 mm)
- Overall width: 60.00 in (1,524 mm)
- Overall length: 10 ft 6 in (3,200 mm)
- Height: 46 in (1,168 mm)
- Engine: Yamaha 1,250cc (sealed) or 1,200cc (open)
- Horsepower: 140 hp (100 kW)
- Weight: 1,300 lb (590 kg). with driver
- Tyres: 205/60R13 Federal SS595 (pavement)
  American Racer 13 inch (dirt)
- Wheels: width: 7 in / diameter: 13 in
- Suspension: coil over with Bilstein shocks
- Frame: full tubeframe with integral rollcage
- Harness: FIA-approved five-point

The cars have very tight specifications to ensure cars are quite similar to each other. All cars utilise the same parts, engine and tyres. The only adjustable areas on the cars are: camber angle, caster angle, ride height, tyre pressure, spring rates, wheelbase, and gearing. All of these adjustments are also strictly regulated in the INEX rule book. The overall similarity in the cars ensures good racing, at a low cost. It also puts the race in the hands of the driver and the setup of the race car, instead of being about who can spend the most money.

== Available body styles ==
Legends car racing
Legends racing on dirt oval Beaver Dam Raceway — 1.9 MB

- 1934 Chevrolet coupé
- 1934 Ford sedan
- 1934 Ford coupé
- 1937 Chevrolet sedan
- 1937 Dodge coupé
- 1937 Ford sedan
- 1937 Ford coupé (no longer available on new cars)
- 1937 Chevrolet coupé (no longer available on new cars)
- 1937 Dodge sedan
- 1940 Ford coupé (no longer available on new cars)
