= Isomäki =

Isomäki is a Finnish surname. Notable people with the surname include:

- Joni Isomäki (born 1985), Finnish ice hockey player
- Risto Isomäki (born 1961), Finnish writer
