= Kurikka =

- Town and municipality
- Kurikan kaupunki Kurikka stad
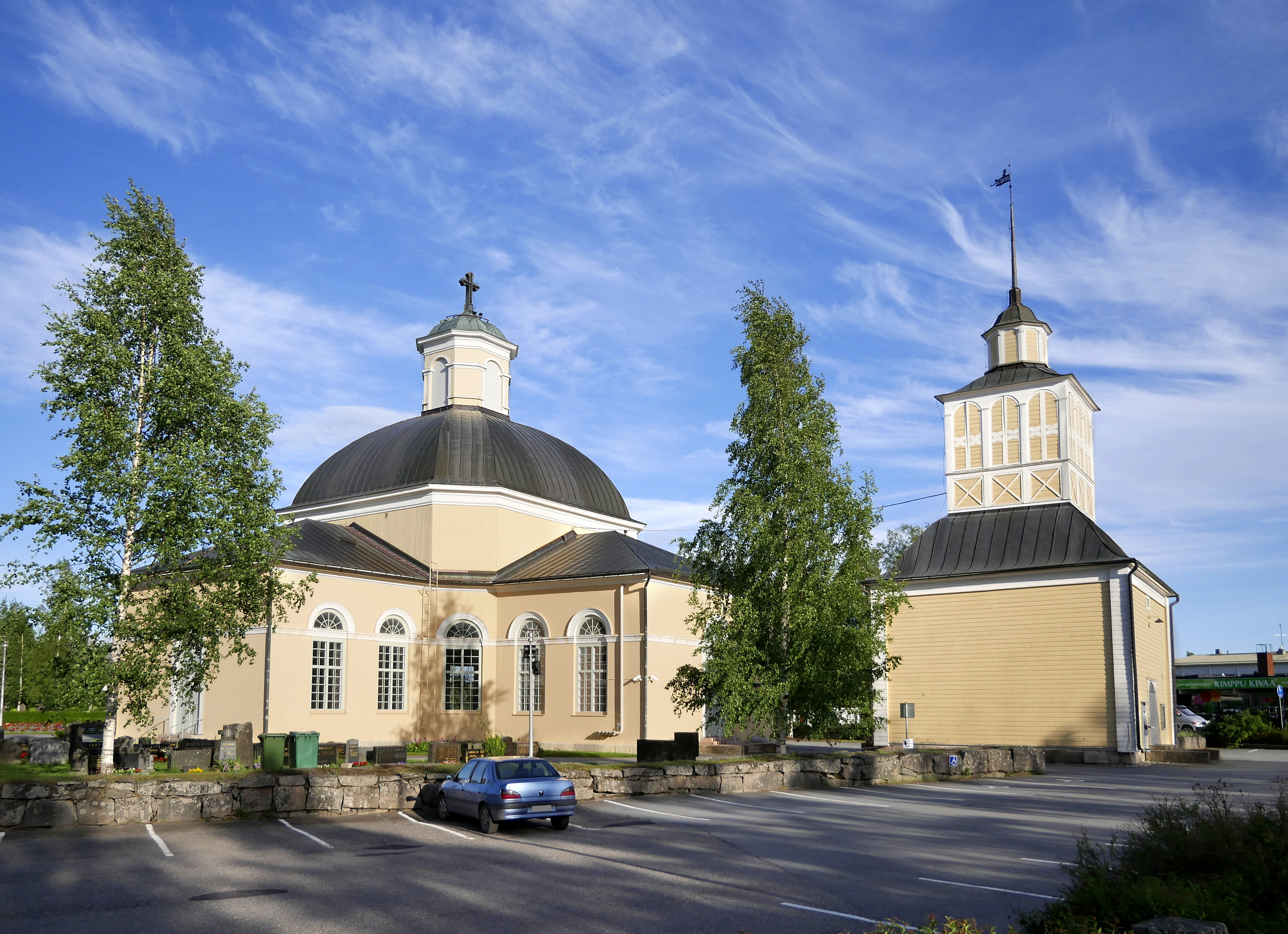
- Church in Kurikka.

- Coat of arms

- Location of Kurikka in Finland
- Interactive map of Kurikka
- Coordinates: 62°37′N 022°24′E
- Country: Finland
- Region: South Ostrobothnia
- Sub-region: Seinäjoki
- Founded: 1868
- Market town: 1966
- City rights: 1977

Government
  - Town manager: Anna-Kaisa Pusa

Area (2018-01-01)
  - Total: 1,743.86 km^{2} (673.31 sq mi)
  - Land: 1,724.62 km^{2} (665.88 sq mi)
  - Water: 7.79 km^{2} (3.01 sq mi)
  - Rank: 36th largest in Finland

Population (2025-12-31)
  - Total: 19,441
  - Rank: 59th largest in Finland
  - Density: 11.27/km^{2} (29.2/sq mi)
  - Demonym: Kurikkalainen (Finnish); From Kurikka (English) Kurikkalaanen (Local dialect)

Population by native language
  - Finnish: 96% (official)
  - Swedish: 0.4%
  - Others: 3.6%

Population by age
  - 0 to 14: 14.7%
  - 15 to 64: 54.7%
  - 65 or older: 30.6%
- Time zone: UTC+02:00 (EET)
  - Summer (DST): UTC+03:00 (EEST)
- Website: kurikka.fi

Kurikka (Finnish: [ˈkurikːɑ]) is a town and municipality in Finland. It is located in the South Ostrobothnia region. The population of Kurikka is 19,441 (31 December 2025) and the municipality covers an area of 1,724.62 km^{2} (665.88 sq mi) of which 7.79 km^{2} (3.01 sq mi) is inland water (1 January 2018). The population density is 11.27/km^{2} (29.2/sq mi). The municipality is unilingually Finnish.

Kurikka is one of the largest shareholders in the Finnish energy giant Fortum as well as in Neste Oil, one of Northern Europe's biggest oil companies. The political scene of the town is dominated by the Finnish Centre because of the agricultural roots and past of the town.

The municipality of Jurva was consolidated to Kurikka on 1 January 2009 and the municipality of Jalasjärvi on 1 January 2016.

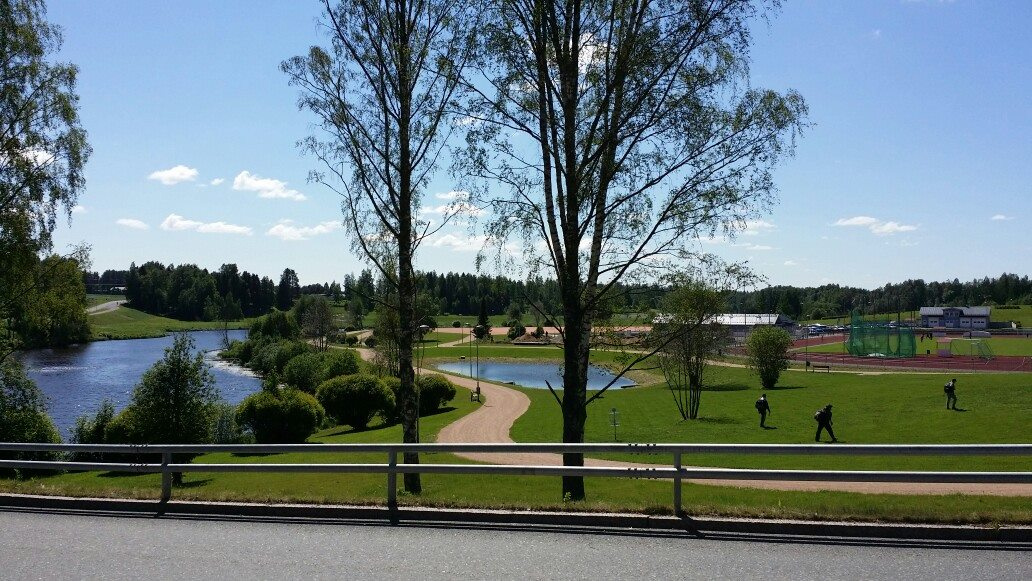
Kurikka central sports park with river scene.

== History ==
There is written evidence of the settlement of Kurikka since the 1540s. As conditions developed in Finland, industrialization began in Kurikka at the beginning of the 20th century, with the metal and wood industries. Kurikka initially belonged to the Isokyrö parish. Kurikka chapel was founded in 1672. The municipality gained independence from Ilmajoki in 1868; it received kauppala rights in 1966 and became a town in 1977.

== Transport ==
Finnish national roads 67, 3 (European Highway E12) and 19 run through Kurikka.

The Suupohja railway from Seinäjoki to Kaskinen runs through Kurikka. Passenger transport on the railway stopped in 1968 and the old railway station now serves as a lunch restaurant. The nearest passenger railway stations are in Seinäjoki and Parkano.

The nearest airport is Seinäjoki Airport.

The private coach company OnniBus route Helsinki—Seinäjoki—Vaasa has a stop at Jalasjärvi.

== Sights ==
- Botniaring, a racing circuit in Jurva
- Jurva church
- Jurva museum
- Kurikka church
- Kurikka museum
- Kusikivi, a rock, behind which Swedish king Adolf Frederick supposedly relieved himself during his tour of Finland after his coronation.
- Pitkämö beach

== Notable people ==
- Arsi Harju (born 1974), shot putter, olympic gold medalist 2000
- Joni Isomäki (born 1985), former ice hockey player
- Juha Mieto (born 1949), former cross country skier
- Jorma Ollila (born 1950), Nokia and Royal Dutch Shell chairman of the board
- Veikko Uusimäki (1921–2008), actor and theater councilor
- Samuli Paulaharju (1875–1944), teacher, ethnographer and writer

== International relations ==
=== Twin towns — Sister cities ===
Kurikka is twinned with:

- Ockelbo Municipality, Sweden
- Melhus Municipality, Norway
- Holmegaard, Denmark
