= Joni Isomäki =

Finnish ice hockey player

Joni Isomaki
- Born: May 24, 1985 (age 39); Kurikka, Finland
- Height: 6 ft 3 in (191 cm)
- Weight: 205 lb (93 kg; 14 st 9 lb)
- Position: Right wing
- Shot: Left
- Played for: Lahti Pelicans; Heinolan Peliitat
- NHL draft: Undrafted
- Playing career: 2006–2014

Joni Isomäki (born May 24, 1985) is a Finnish former ice hockey player. He retired in 2014

Isomaki made his SM-liiga debut playing with Lahti Pelicans during the 2011–12 SM-liiga season.

He now plays rinkball for Flexolahti.

== Career statistics ==
| | | | Regular season | | | | | Playoffs |
| Season | Team | League | GP | G | A | Pts | PIM | GP | G | A | Pts | PIM |
|---|---|---|---|---|---|---|---|---|---|---|---|---|
| 2002–03 | APV U18 | U18 I-divisioona | 14 | 23 | 15 | 38 | 4 | — | — | — | — | — |
| 2003–04 | JYP Jyväskylä U20 | U20 SM-liiga | 23 | 1 | 4 | 5 | 6 | — | — | — | — | — |
| 2004–05 | JYP Jyväskylä U20 | U20 SM-liiga | 25 | 6 | 4 | 10 | 16 | 9 | 2 | 1 | 3 | 2 |
| 2005–06 | JYP Jyväskylä U20 | U20 SM-liiga | 32 | 9 | 11 | 20 | 8 | — | — | — | — | — |
| 2006–07 | HeKi | Mestis | 35 | 6 | 7 | 13 | 28 | 3 | 0 | 1 | 1 | 2 |
| 2007–08 | HeKi | Mestis | 38 | 4 | 7 | 11 | 10 | — | — | — | — | — |
| 2008–09 | HeKi | Mestis | 45 | 5 | 8 | 13 | 10 | — | — | — | — | — |
| 2009–10 | HeKi | Mestis | 45 | 5 | 10 | 15 | 20 | 6 | 2 | 1 | 3 | 0 |
| 2010–11 | HeKi | Mestis | 37 | 10 | 7 | 17 | 10 | — | — | — | — | — |
| 2011–12 | Lahti Pelicans | SM-liiga | 13 | 0 | 3 | 3 | 4 | — | — | — | — | — |
| 2011–12 | Peliitat Heinola | Mestis | 26 | 4 | 5 | 9 | 8 | — | — | — | — | — |
| 2012–13 | Lahti Pelicans | SM-liiga | 19 | 0 | 0 | 0 | 4 | — | — | — | — | — |
| 2012–13 | Peliitat Heinola | Mestis | 3 | 0 | 1 | 1 | 0 | — | — | — | — | — |
| 2013–14 | Peliitat Heinola | Mestis | 55 | 10 | 16 | 26 | 18 | — | — | — | — | — |
| SM-liiga totals | | | 32 | 0 | 3 | 3 | 8 | — | — | — | — | — |
| Mestis totals | | | 284 | 44 | 61 | 105 | 104 | 9 | 2 | 2 | 4 | 2 |
