= Kārlis Ozoliņš =

Kārlis Ozoliņš may refer to:

- Kārlis Ozoliņš (ice hockey)
- Kārlis Ozoliņš (tennis)
- Kārlis Ozoliņš (politician)
