= Jurva =

Former municipality in South Ostrobothnia, Finland

Coordinates: 62°41′10″N 21°58′55″E

Location of Jurva in Finland

The former coat of arms of Jurva

Jurva is a former municipality of Finland. It was consolidated to Kurikka on 1 January 2009.

It is located in the province of Western Finland and is part of the South Ostrobothnia region. The municipality had a population of 4,611 (2003) and covered an area of 447.18 km² of which 3.11 km² is water. The population density was 10.3 inhabitants per km².

The municipality was unilingually Finnish.
