= Botniaring Racing Circuit =

Race track in Finland

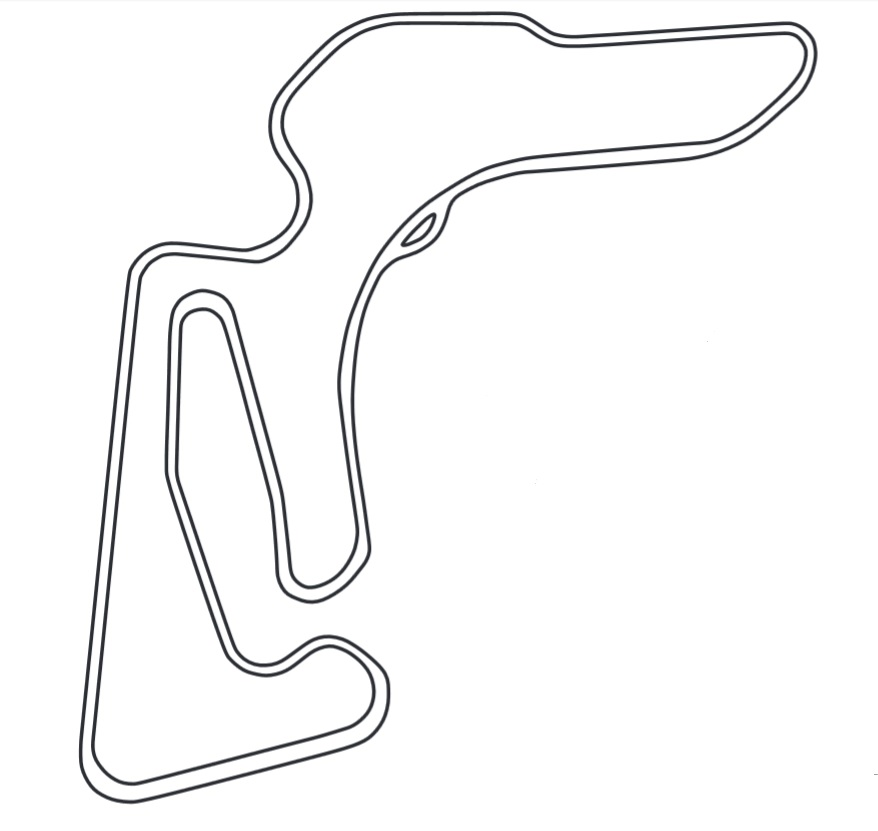
- Long Circuit (2013–present)

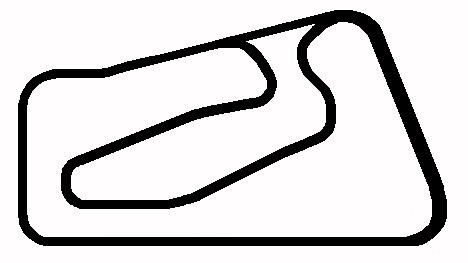
- Original Circuit (1989–present)
- Location: Jurva, Finland
- Coordinates: 62°37′37″N 22°00′58″E
- Opened: 1989
- Major events: Former: Legends Road Course World Finals (2017)

Long Circuit (2013–present)
- Length: 4,014 km (2,494 mi)
- Turns: 16
- Race lap record: 1:30.171 ( (Finland) Jussi Kuivakangas, Dallara F309, 2022, F3)

Original Circuit (1989–present)
- Surface: 9
- Length: 2.618 km (1.627 mi)
- Race lap record: 1:04.227 ( (Finland) Teemu Tanninen, Dallara F394, 2003, F3)

The Botniaring is a racing circuit situated in Southern Ostrobothnia, Jurva, Finland. The track is mostly used for national races but in the last years there have been also arranged NEZ (North European Zone) races.

The circuit hosted the Legends World Course Road Finals in 2017.

== Lap records ==
As of June 2022, the fastest official race lap records at the Botniaring Racing Circuit are listed as:

Category	Time	Driver	Vehicle	Date
Long Circuit (2013–present): 4.014 km (2.494 mi)
Formula Three	1:30.171	Jussi Kuivakangas	Dallara F309	11 June 2022
Superbike	1:36.242	Vesa Kallio	KTM 990 Super Duke	21 July 2013
Porsche Carrera Cup	1:36.668	Mantas Janavicius	Porsche 911 (992) GT3 Cup	11 June 2022
Supersport	1:37.419	Niki Tuuli	Yamaha YZF-R6	24 May 2016
Formula Ford	1:37.587	Joonas Lappalainen	Mygale SJ08A	21 July 2013
Formula Renault 1.6	1:39.900	Joonas Lappalainen	Signatech FR1.6	18 May 2014
Moto3	1:41.597	Niklas Ajo	KTM RC250GP	20 July 2013
TCR Touring Car	1:42.200	Julius Adomavicius	CUPRA León TCR DSG	16 June 2019
Supersport 300	1:49.923	Arttu Matikainen	Kawasaki Ninja 400	15 August 2021
Original Circuit (1989–present): 2.618 km (1.627 mi)
Formula Three	1:04.227	Teemu Tanninen	Dallara F394	29 June 2003
Formula Renault 2.0	1:04.629	Valtteri Bottas	Tatuus FR2000	12 May 2007
Superbike	1:05.680	Erno Kostamo	BMW S1000RR	26 May 2018
250cc	1:09.016	Vesa Kallio	Honda NSR250	12 August 2001
Supersport	1:09.330	Erkka Korpiaho	Suzuki GSX-R600	6 July 2003
Formula Ford	1:09.764	Antti Buri	Mygale SJ08A	13 August 2010
125cc	1:11.377	Mika Kallio	Honda RS125R	12 August 2001
Porsche Carrera Cup	1:12.175	Raimo Niemi	Porsche 911 (997 I) GT3 Cup	1 July 2012
