= List of companies of Estonia =

Location of Estonia

Estonia is a country in the Baltic region of Northern Europe. It is a developed country with an advanced, high-income economy that as of 2011 is among the fastest growing in the EU. Its Human Development Index ranks very highly, and it performs favourably in measurements of economic freedom, civil liberties and press freedom (3rd in the world in 2012 and 2007). The 2015 PISA test places Estonian high school students 3rd in the world, behind Singapore and Japan. Citizens of Estonia are provided with universal health care, free education and the longest paid maternity leave in the OECD. Since independence the country has rapidly developed its IT sector, becoming one of the world's most digitally advanced societies. In 2005 Estonia became the first nation to hold elections over the Internet, and in 2014 the first nation to provide E-residency.

For further information on the types of business entities in this country and their abbreviations, see "Business entities in Estonia".

== Notable firms ==
This list includes notable companies with primary headquarters located in the country. The industry and sector follow the Industry Classification Benchmark taxonomy. Organizations which have ceased operations are included and noted as defunct.

Notable companies Status: P=Private, S=State; A=Active, D=Defunct
| Name | Industry | Sector | Headquarters | Founded | Notes | Status | |
|---|---|---|---|---|---|---|---|
| A. Le Coq | Consumer goods | Brewers | Tartu | 1807 | Brewery | P | A |
| Airest | Consumer services | Airlines | Tallinn | 2002 | Airline | P | A |
| Alexela | Oil & gas | Exploration & production | Tallinn | 1990 | Oil & gas | P | A |
| Aqris | Technology | Software | Tallinn | 1999 | Software development | P | A |
| AS Starman | Telecommunications | Fixed line telecommunications | Tallinn | 1992 | Cable, ISP | P | A |
| Avies | Consumer services | Airlines | Tallinn | 1991 | Airline, defunct 2016 | P | D |
| Baltika Group | Consumer services | Apparel retailers | Tallinn | 1928 | Apparel | P | A |
| BLRT Grupp | Industrials | Commercial vehicles & trucks | Tallinn | 1912 | Shipbuilding | P | A |
| Bolt | Technology | Transportation | Tallinn | 2013 | Ride-hailing, food delivery, micromobility | P | A |
| Copterline | Consumer services | Airlines | Tallinn | 2010 | Helicopter airline, defunct 2016 | P | D |
| Eesti Energia | Utilities | Conventional electricity | Tallinn | 1939 | Energy company | P | A |
| Eesti Gaas | Utilities | Gas distribution | Tallinn | 1990 | Natural gas company | P | A |
| Eesti Raudtee | Industrials | Railroads | Tallinn | 1992 | National railway company | S | A |
| Elering | Utilities | Conventional electricity | Tallinn | 1998 | Electrical distribution | S | A |
| Elron | Consumer services | Travel & tourism | Tallinn | 1998 | Passenger rail operator | S | A |
| Enefit Kaevandused | Basic materials | General mining | Jõhvi | 1945 | Mining | S | A |
| Enefit Solutions | Industrials | Business support services | Jõhvi | 1959 | Engineering support | P | A |
| Enimex | Consumer services | Airlines | Tallinn | 1994 | Airline, defunct 2008 | P | D |
| EstDomains | Technology | Internet | Tartu | ? | Domain provider, defunct 2008 | P | D |
| Estonia Piano Factory | Consumer goods | Recreational products | Tallinn | 1950 | Pianos | P | A |
| Estonian Record Productions | Consumer services | Broadcasting & entertainment | Tallinn | 2001 | Recording studio | P | A |
| Fortumo | Financials | Financial services | Tartu | 2007 | Payments | P | A |
| GoRail | Consumer services | Travel & tourism | Tallinn | 1998 | Passenger rail operator | P | A |
| Kalev | Consumer goods | Food products | Lehmja | 1806 | Confectionery producer | P | A |
| Liviko | Consumer goods | Distillers & vintners | Tallinn | 1898 | Distillery | P | A |
| Moonwalk Records | Consumer services | Broadcasting & entertainment | Tallinn | 2005 | Recording studio | P | A |
| Narva Oil Plant | Oil & gas | Exploration & production | Auvere | 1980 | Shale oil producer | P | A |
| Nortal | Technology | Software | Tallinn | 2000 | Software development | P | A |
| Olerex | Consumer services | Specialty retailers | Tartu | 1994 | Gas station chain | P | A |
| Omniva | Logistics | Delivery services | Tallinn | 1638 | Postal service | P | A |
| Publishing House ERSEN | Consumer services | Publishing | Tallinn | ? | Book publisher | P | A |
| Quattromed | Health care | Biotechnology | Tartu | 1999 | Medical diagnostics | P | A |
| Rakvere Lihakombinaat | Consumer goods | Food products | Roodevälja | 1890 | Meat | P | A |
| Saaremaa Shipping Company | Industrials | Marine transportation | Kuressaare | 1992 | Ferry traffic | P | A |
| Saku Brewery | Consumer goods | Brewers | Saku | 1820 | Brewery | P | A |
| SEB Pank | Financials | Banks | Tallinn | 2008 | Bank | P | A |
| Selver | Consumer services | Food retailers & wholesalers | Tallinn | 1995 | Supermarkets, owned by Tallinna Kaubamaja Grupp | P | A |
| Sky Media Group | Consumer services | Broadcasting & entertainment | Tallinn | 1995 | Broadcaster | P | A |
| SmartPost | Industrials | Delivery services | Tallinn | 2006 | Logistics | P | A |
| Tallink | Industrials | Marine transportation | Tallinn | 1989 | Ferry traffic | P | A |
| Tänapäev | Consumer services | Publishing | Tallinn | 1999 | Publisher | P | A |
| Tartu Mill | Consumer goods | Food products | Tartu | 2000 | Grain | P | A |
| Telia Eesti | Telecommunications | Fixed line telecommunications | Tallinn | 1993 | Telecommunications services | P | A |
| Tondi Elektroonika | Industrials | Electronic equipment | Tallinn | 1959 | Electronic components | P | A |
| TopTen | Consumer services | Broadcasting & entertainment | Tallinn | ? | Recording studio | P | A |
| Ülemiste Keskus | Consumer services | Broadline retailers | Tallinn | ? | Shopping center | P | A |
| Varrak | Consumer services | Publishing | Tallinn | 1991 | Book publisher | P | A |
| Viru Keemia Grupp | Oil & gas | Exploration & production | Kohtla-Järve | 1924 | Shale extractor | P | A |
| VKG Elektrivõrgud | Utilities | Conventional electricity | Narva | 1993 | Electrical distribution | P | A |
| ZeroTurnaround | Technology | Software | Tartu | 2007 | Software development | P | A |

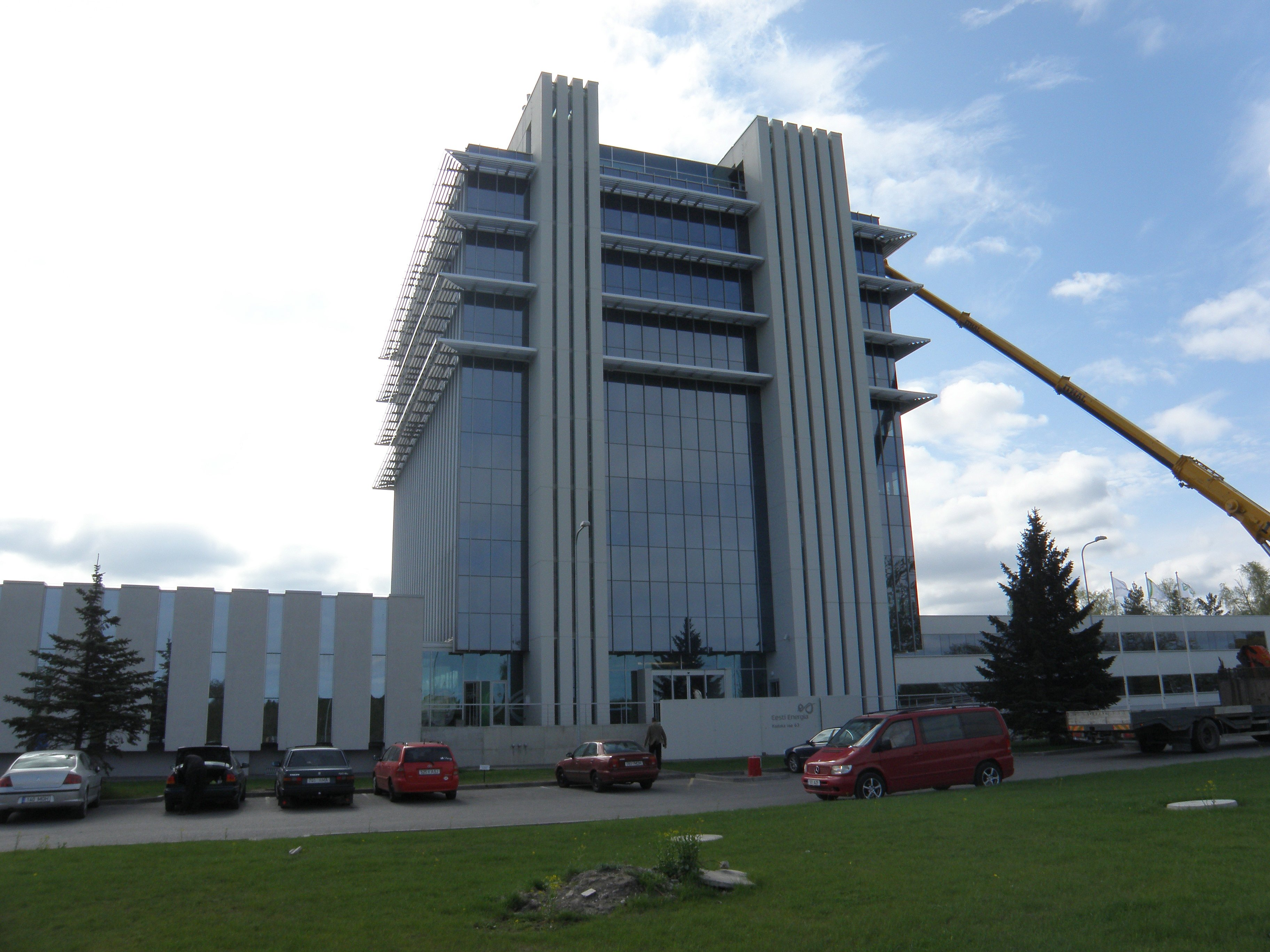
Headquarters of Eesti Energia in Tallinn.

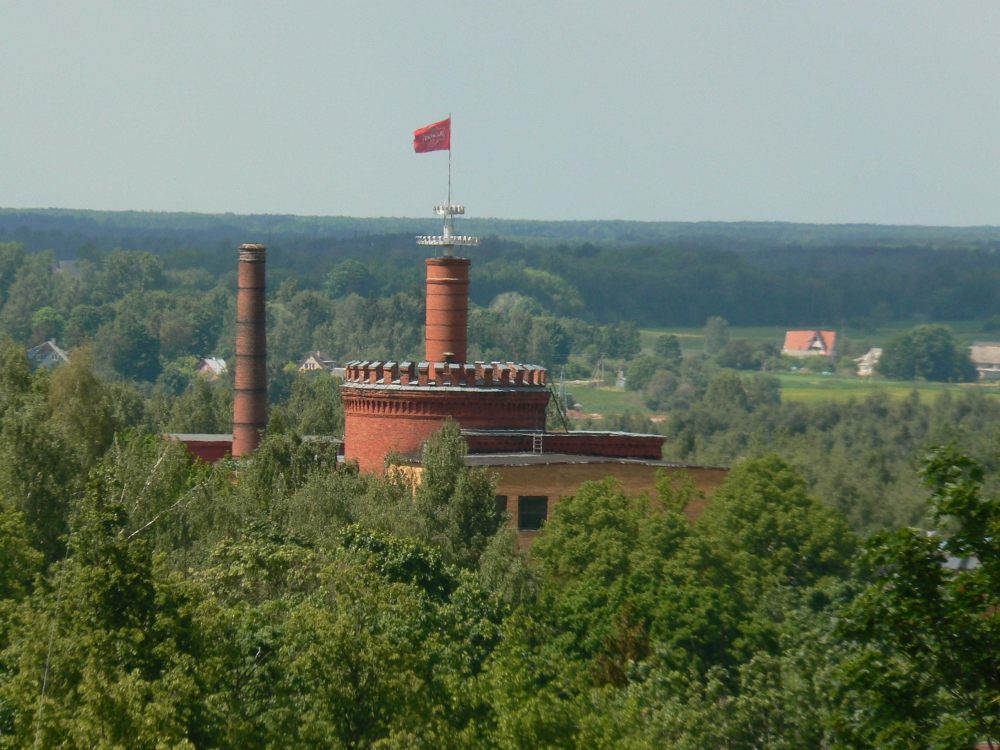
A. Le Coq brewery in Tartu.

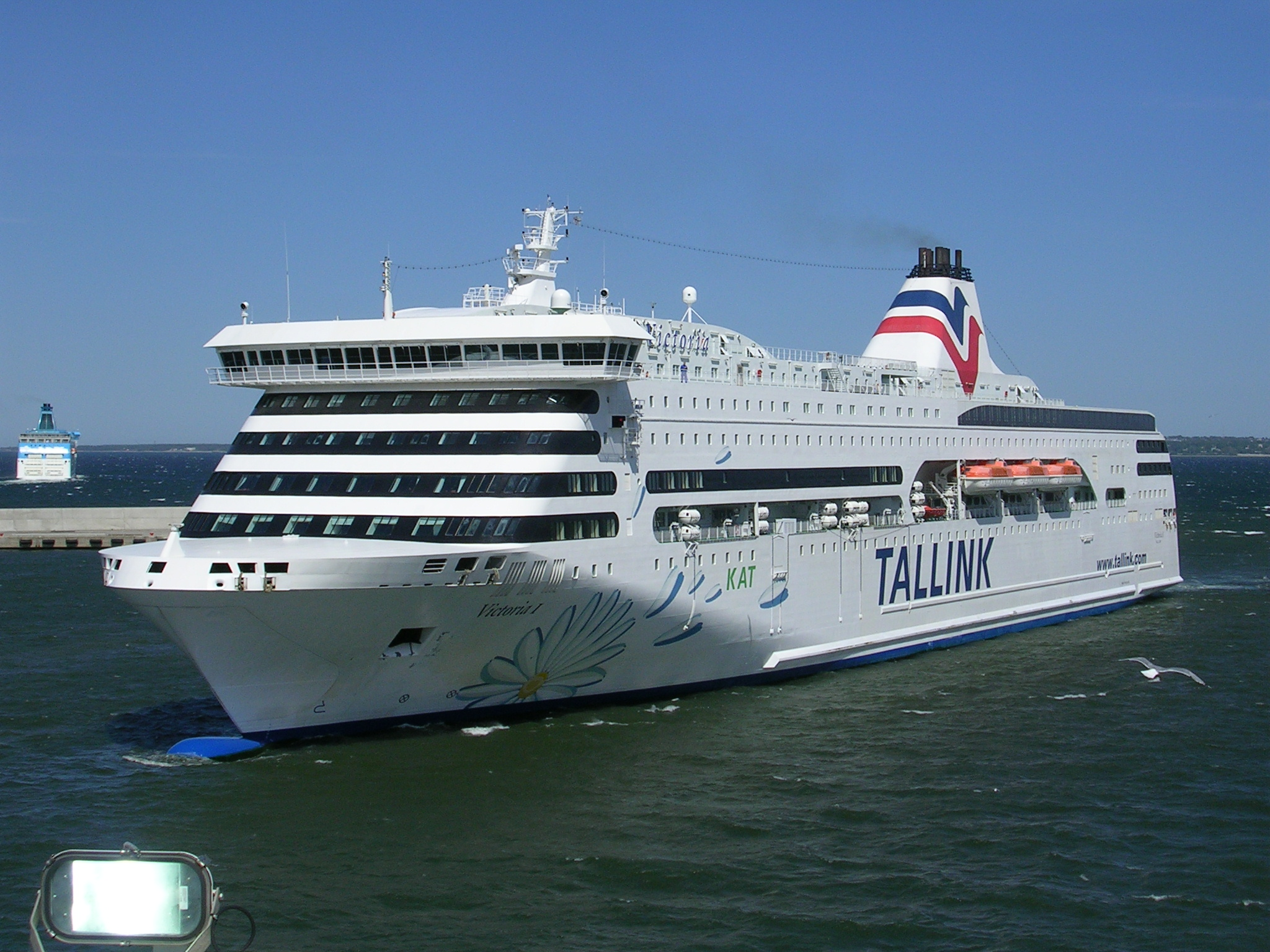
Tallink ferry Victoria I.

== Notable former firms ==
- Esto-Muusika (music supply business in Estonia, existed 1921–1940)
- Radio Factory RET

== See also ==
- Economy of Estonia
- List of airlines of Estonia
- List of banks in Estonia
