= Annus (surname) =

Estonian family name

Origin
- Language: Estonian
- Meaning: "dose", "batch"
- Region of origin: Estonia

Annus is an Estonian word meaning "dose", or "batch".

As of 1 January 2021, 219 men and 251 women in Estonia have the surname Annus. Annus is ranked the 251st most common surname for men in Estonia and 237th for women. The surname Annus is most common in Lääne-Viru County, where 6.81 per 10,000 inhabitants of the county bear the surname.

Notable people bearing the surname Annus include:

- Epp Annus (born 1969), writer and literary scholar
- Endel Annus (1915–2011), bibliographer
- Lembit Annus (1941–2018), communist politician
- Maria Annus (born 1979), actress
- Olev Annus (born 1951), bodybuilder
- Rednar Annus (born 1970), actor and director
- Ruth Annus (born 1973), civil servant and translator
- Toivo Annus (1972–2020), engineer and investor
- Toomas Annus (born 1960), entrepreneur
- Uku Annus (1947–2019), orienteer

== See also ==
- Adrián Annus (born 1973), Hungarian hammer thrower
- Allan Vainola (birth name Allan Annus; born 1965), Estonian musician and composer
