= Vaskjõgi Nature Reserve =

Protected area in Estonia

- Location within Estonia
- Location: Estonia
- Coordinates: 58°20′N 24°41′E
- Area: 291 ha (720 acres)
- Established: 2007

Vaskjõgi Nature Reserve (Estonian: Vaskjõe looduskaitseala) is a nature reserve which is located in Pärnu County, Estonia.

The area of the nature reserve is 291 ha.

The protected area was founded in 2007 to protect valuable habitat types and threatened species in Seljametsa and Vaskrääma village (both in former Paikuse Parish).
