= FITkit (disambiguation) =

The word "FITkit" may apply to several different topics:

In immunology:

- FITkit, an immunological test for measuring natural rubber latex (NRL) allergens from a variety of rubber products, such as gloves

In computer science:

- FITkit (hardware), educational hardware platform on Brno University of Technology
