= Colonization =

Establishment and development of settlements by people or animals

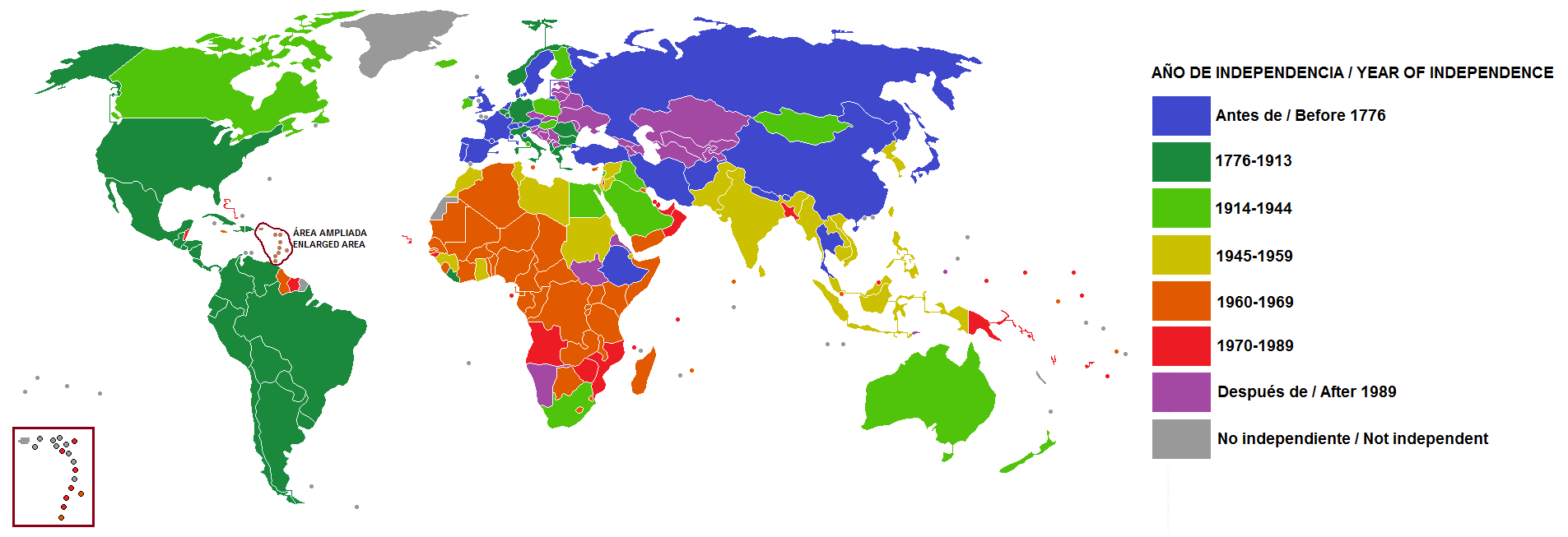
Map of the year each country or territory achieved independence.

Colonization or colonisation is defined as "the act or process of sending people to live in and govern another country". The term "colonization" is sometimes used synonymously with the word "settlement".

Settler colonialism is a type of colonization structured and enforced by the settlers directly, while their or their ancestors' metropolitan country (metropole) maintains a connection or control through the settler's activities. In settler colonization, a minority group rules either through the assimilation or oppression of the existing inhabitants, or by establishing itself as the demographic majority through driving away, displacing or outright killing the existing people, as well as through immigration and births of metropolitan as well as other settlers. Karl T. Muth notes in The Oxford Handbook of Global Policy and Transnational Administration that "Under the colonial framework, the administrative functions of government are partitioned according to the political convenience (and, often, economic interest) of the parent state rather than at the behest of the colony's residents."

The European colonization of Australia, New Zealand, and other places in Oceania was fueled by explorers, and colonists often regarding the encountered landmasses as terra nullius ("empty land", or literally "nobody's land" in Latin). This resulted in laws and ideas such as Mexico's 1824 General Colonization Law and the United States' manifest destiny doctrine which furthered colonization.

== Etymology ==
The term colonization is derived from the Latin words colere ("to cultivate, to till"), colonia ("a landed estate", "a farm") and colonus ("a tiller of the soil", "a farmer"), then by extension "to inhabit". Someone who engages in colonization, i.e. the agent noun, is referred to as a colonizer, while the person who gets colonized, i.e. the object of the agent noun or absolutive, is referred to as a colonizee, colonisee or the colonised. Colonization is a process of establishing, maintaining and immigrating to settlements.

== Pre-modern colonization ==
=== Classical period ===
In ancient times, maritime nations such as the city-states of Greece and Phoenicia established colonies in other parts of the Mediterranean.

Another period of colonization in ancient times was during the Roman Empire. The Roman Empire conquered large parts of Western Europe, North Africa, and West Asia. In North Africa and West Asia, the Romans often conquered what they regarded as 'civilized' peoples. As they moved north into Europe, they mostly encountered rural peoples/tribes with very little in the way of cities. In these areas, waves of Roman colonization often followed the conquest of the areas. Many of the current cities throughout Europe began as Roman colonies, such as Cologne, Germany, originally called Colonia Claudia Ara Agrippinensium by the Romans, and the British capital city of London, which the Romans founded as Londinium.

=== Middle Ages ===
The decline and collapse of the Roman Empire saw (and was partly caused by) the large-scale movement of people in Eastern Europe and Asia. This is largely seen as beginning with nomadic horsemen from Asia (specifically the Huns) moving into the richer pasture land to the west, thus forcing the local people there to move further west and so on until eventually the Goths were forced to cross into the Roman Empire, resulting in continuous war with Rome which played a major role in the fall of the Roman Empire. During this period there were large-scale movements of people establishing new colonies all over western Europe. The events of this time saw the development of many of the modern-day nations of Europe like the Franks in France and Germany and the Anglo-Saxons in England.

In West Asia, during the reign of the Sassanid Empire, some Persians established colonies in Yemen and Oman. The Arabs also established colonies in Northern Africa, Mesopotamia, and the Levant.

The Vikings of Scandinavia also carried out a large-scale colonization. The Vikings are best known as raiders, setting out from their original homelands in Denmark, southern Norway, and southern Sweden, to pillage the coastlines of northern Europe. In time, the Vikings began trading and established colonies. The Vikings first came across Iceland and established colonies there before moving onto Greenland, where they built settlements that endured until the 15th century. The Vikings launched an unsuccessful attempt at colonizing an area they called Vinland, which is probably at a site now known as L'Anse aux Meadows, Newfoundland and Labrador, on the eastern coastline of Canada.

== Colonial era ==
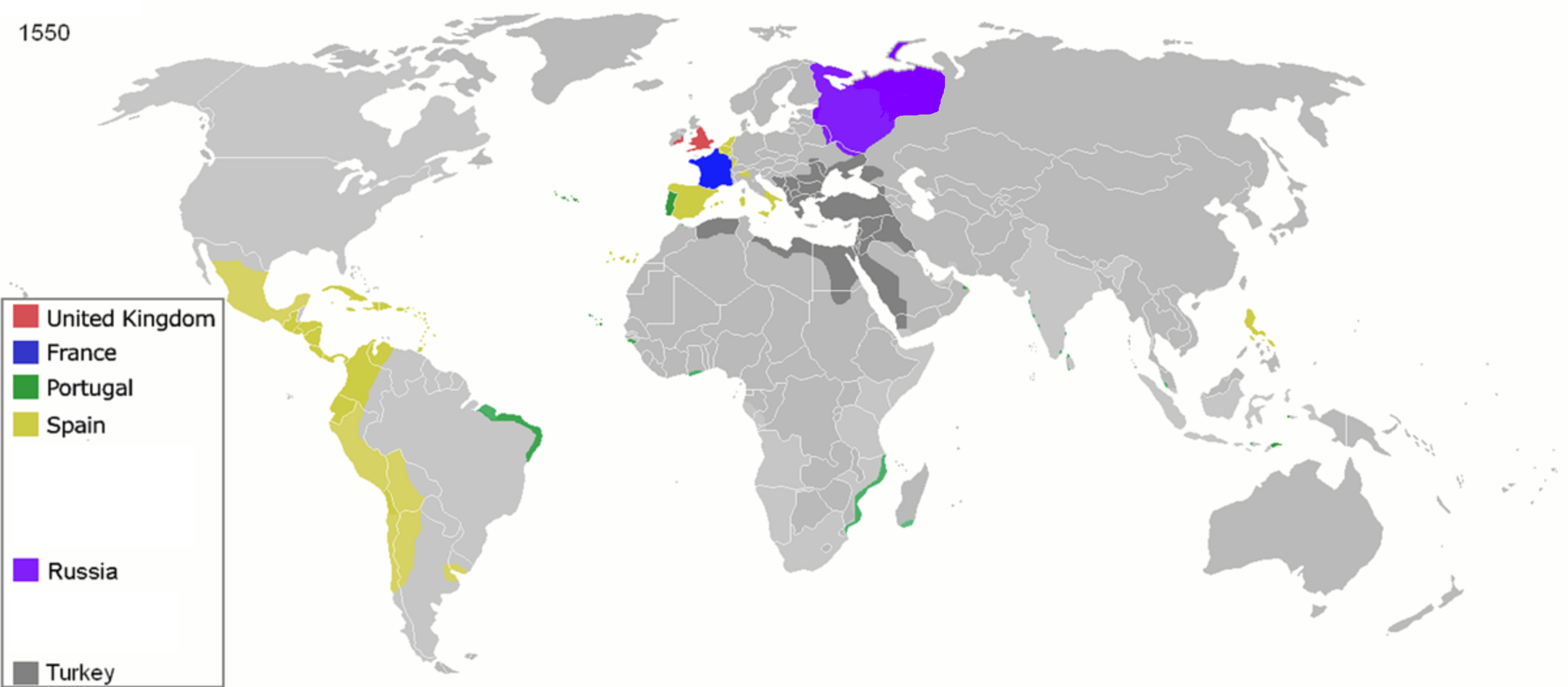
World empires and colonies in 1550

World empires and colonies in 1800 (Christian only)

In the colonial era, colonialism in this context refers mostly to Western European countries' colonization of lands mainly in the Americas, Africa, Asia, and Oceania. The main European countries active in this form of colonization included Spain, Portugal, France, the Tsardom of Russia (later Russian Empire), the Kingdom of England (later Great Britain), the Netherlands, the Kingdom of Italy, the Kingdom of Prussia (now mostly Germany), Belgium, Denmark, and Sweden-Norway, and, beginning in the 18th century, the United States. Most of these countries had a period of almost complete power in world trade at some stage in the period from roughly 1500 to 1900. Beginning in the late 19th century, the Empire of Japan also engaged in settler colonization, most notably in Hokkaido and Korea.

While some European colonization focused on shorter-term exploitation of economic opportunities (Newfoundland, for example, or Siberia) or addressed specific goals such as settlers seeking religious freedom (Massachusetts), at other times long-term social and economic planning was involved for both parties, but more on the colonizing countries themselves, based on elaborate theory-building (note James Oglethorpe's Colony of Georgia in the 1730s and Edward Gibbon Wakefield's New Zealand Company in the 1840s).

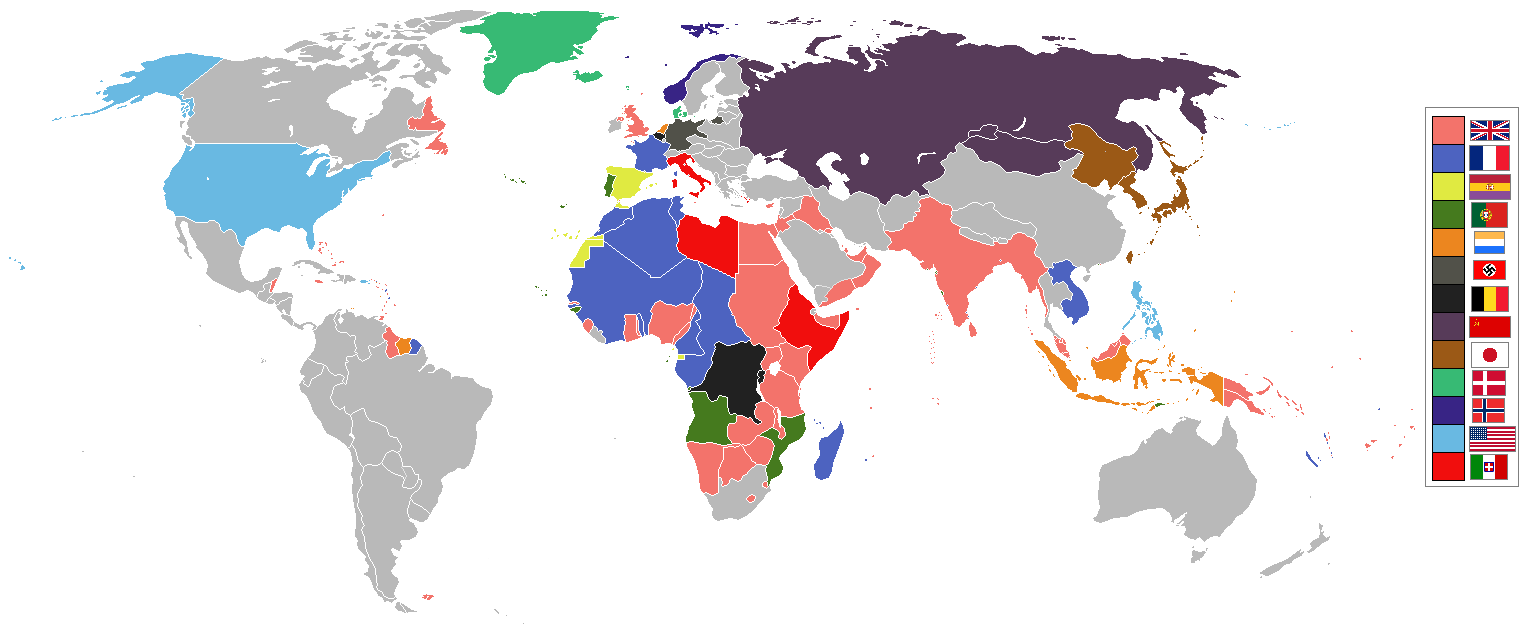
World empires and colonies in 1936

Colonization may be used as a method of absorbing and assimilating foreign people into the culture of the imperial country. One instrument to this end is linguistic imperialism, or the use of non-indigenous colonial languages to the exclusion of any indigenous languages from administrative (and often, any public) use.

== 20th–21st century on Earth ==
=== Soviet Union ===
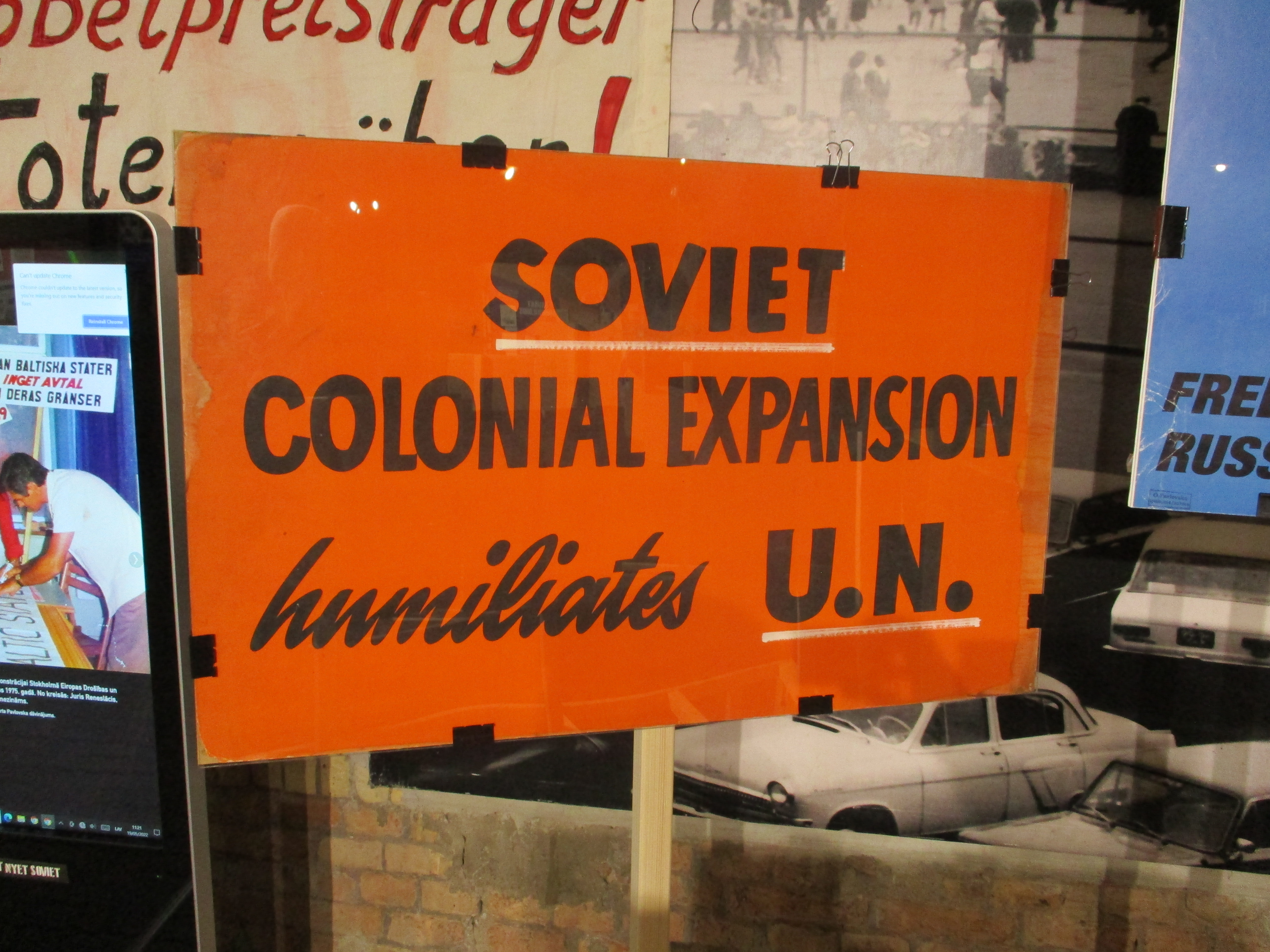
A protest sign from the second half of the 20th century criticizing UN reaction to Soviet colonial expansion

In the 1920s, the Soviet regime implemented the so-called korenizatsiia policy in an attempt to win the trust of non-Russians by promoting their ethnic cultures and establishing for them many of the characteristic institutional forms of the nation-state. The early Soviet regime was hostile to even voluntary assimilation, and tried to de-Russify assimilated non-Russians. Parents and students not interested in the promotion of their national languages were labeled as displaying "abnormal attitudes". The authorities concluded that minorities unaware of their ethnicities had to be subjected to Belarusization, Polonization, etc.

By the early 1930s, the Soviet government introduced limited Russification; allowing voluntary assimilation, which was often a popular demand. The list of nationalities was reduced from 172 in 1927 to 98 in 1939, by revoking support for small nations in order to merge them into bigger ones. Russians were now presented as the most advanced and least chauvinist people of the Soviet Union.

The Soviet control of Königsberg area of East Prussia (modern Kaliningrad Oblast), given to the Soviet Union at the 1945 Potsdam Conference, meant a forcible expulsion of the remaining German population and mostly involuntary resettlement of the area with Soviet civilians.

==== Baltic states ====
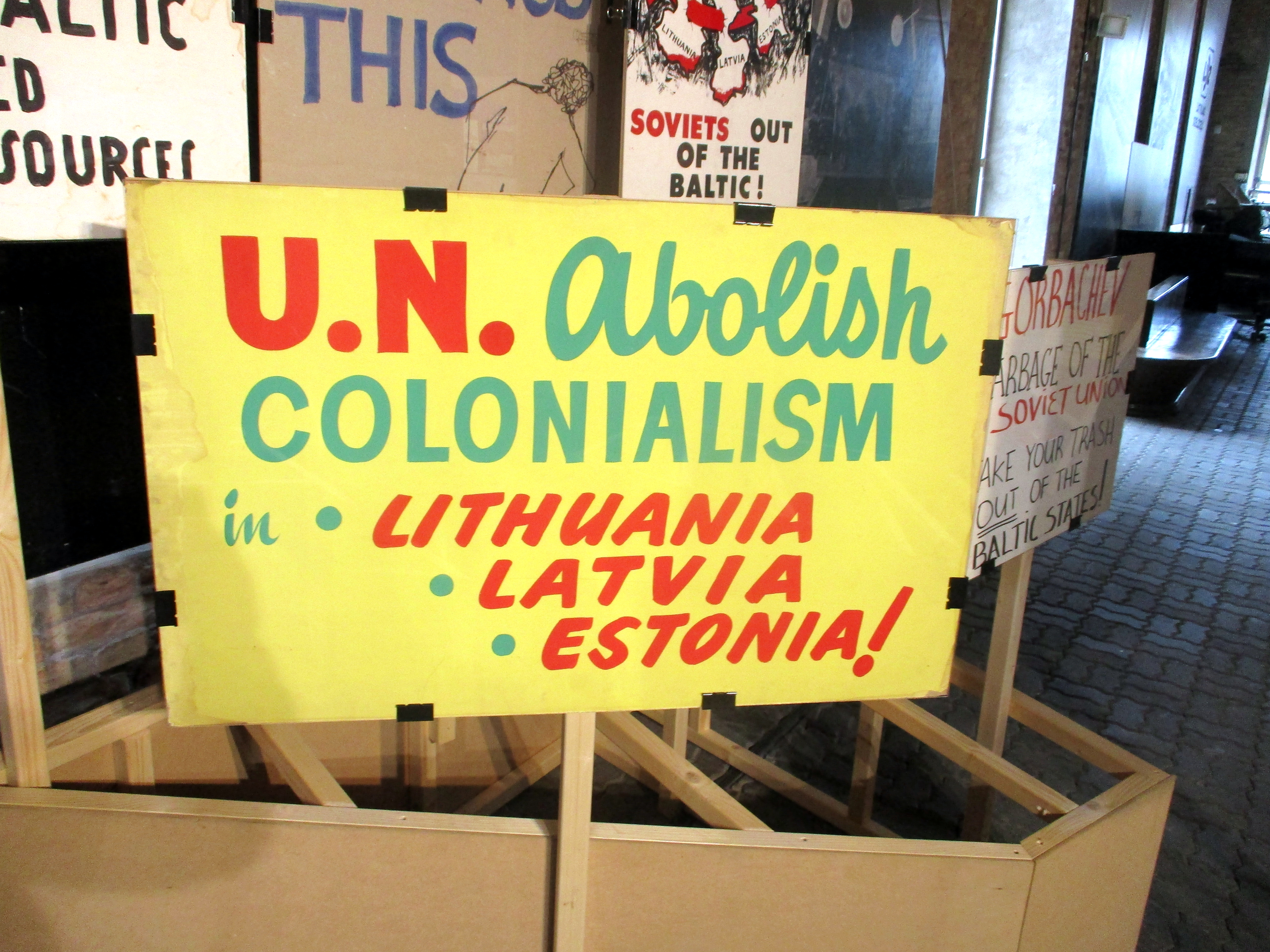
A protest sign from the 1980s calling on the UN to abolish Soviet colonialism in the Baltic states

Large numbers of ethnic Russians and other Russian speakers were settled in the three Baltic countries – Lithuania, Latvia, and Estonia – after their reoccupation in 1944, while local languages, religion and customs were suppressed. David Chioni Moore classified it as a "reverse-cultural colonization", where the colonized perceived the colonizers as culturally inferior. Colonization of the three Baltic countries was closely tied to mass executions, deportations and repression of the native population. During both Soviet occupations (1940–1941; 1944–1991) a combined 605,000 inhabitants of the three countries were either killed or deported (135,000 Estonians, 170,000 Latvians and 320,000 Lithuanians), while their properties and personal belongings, along with ones who fled the country, were confiscated and given to the arriving colonists – Soviet military and NKVD personnel, as well as functionaries of the Communist Party and economic migrants from kolkhozes.

The most dramatic case was Latvia, where the amount of ethnic Russians swelled from 168,300 (8.8%) in 1935 to 905,500 (34%) in 1989, whereas the proportion of ethnic Latvians fell from 77% in 1935 to 52% in 1989. Baltic states also faced intense economic exploitation, with Latvian SSR, for example, transferring 15.961 billion rubles (or 18.8% percent of its total revenue of 85 billion rubles) more to the USSR budget from 1946 to 1990 than it received back. And of the money transferred back, a disproportionate amount was spent on the region's militarization and funding of repressive institutions, especially in the early years of the occupation. It has been calculated by a Latvian state-funded commission that the Soviet occupation cost the economy of Latvia a total of 185 billion euros.

Conversely, Marxian economist and world-systems analyst Samir Amin asserts that, in contrast to colonialism, capital transfer in the USSR was used to develop poorer regions in the South and East with the wealthiest regions like Western Russia, Ukraine, and the Baltic Republics being the main source of capital. Estonian researcher Epp Annus acknowledges that the Soviet rule in the Baltic states did not possess every single characteristic of traditional colonialism since the Baltic states were already modern industrial European nation states with an established sense of national identity and cultural self-confidence prior to their Soviet invasion in 1940 and proposed that the initial Soviet occupation developed into a colonial rule gradually, as the local resistance turned into a hybrid coexistence with the Soviet power. The Soviet colonial rule never managed to fully establish itself and began rapidly disintegrating during perestroika, but after the restoration of independence, the Baltic states similarly had to deal with problems of a characteristically colonial nature, such as pollution, economic collapse and demographic tensions.

==== Jewish oblast ====
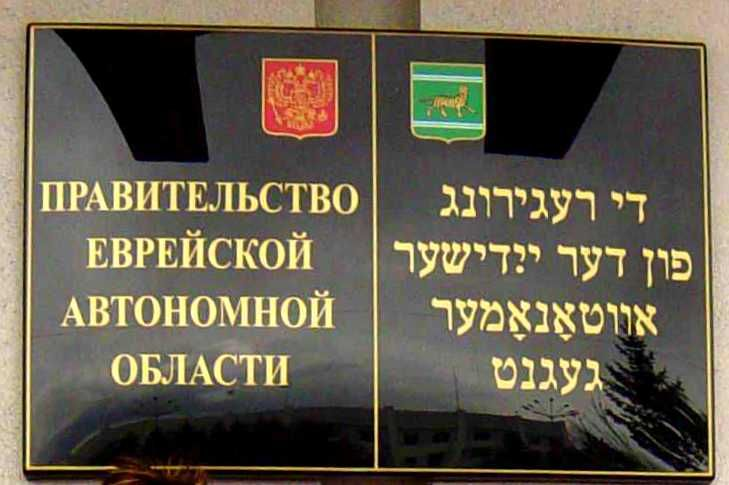
Sign on the JAO government headquarters

In 1934, the Soviet government established the Jewish Autonomous Oblast in the Soviet Far East to create a homeland for the Jewish people. Another motive was to strengthen Soviet presence along the vulnerable eastern border. The region was often infiltrated by the Chinese; in 1927, Chiang Kai-shek had ended cooperation with the Chinese Communist Party, which further increased the threat. Japan also seemed willing and ready to detach the Far Eastern provinces from the USSR. To make settlement of the inhospitable and undeveloped region more enticing, the Soviet government allowed private ownership of land. This led to many non-Jews to settle in the oblast to get a free farm.

By the 1930s, a massive propaganda campaign developed to induce more Jewish settlers to move there. In one instance, a government-produced Yiddish film called Seekers of Happiness told the story of a Jewish family that fled the Great Depression in the United States to make a new life for itself in Birobidzhan. Some 1,200 non-Soviet Jews chose to settle in Birobidzhan. The Jewish population peaked in 1948 at around 30,000, about one-quarter of the region's population. By 2010, according to data provided by the Russian Census Bureau, there were only 1,628 people of Jewish descent remaining in the JAO (1% of the total population), while ethnic Russians made up 92.7% of the JAO population. The JAO is Russia's only autonomous oblast and, aside of Israel, the world's only Jewish territory with an official status.

=== Cyprus ===
Turkish settlers in Northern Cyprus have been described as settler colonization by some scholars.

=== Israel ===
Beginning in the late 19th century, the Zionist movement began laying the demographic and institutional foundations for the establishment of the State of Israel in 1948 by pursuing the colonization of Palestine through Jewish immigration, land acquisition, and permanent settlement.

Whether this process should be classified as colonialism, and more specifically within the modern theoretical framework of settler colonialism, is the subject of scholarly debate. One body of scholarship classifies Zionism as a settler-colonial movement. Another strand of scholarship qualifies the settler-colonial classification, acknowledging that Zionism involved colonization or had colonial characteristics while distinguishing it from conventional colonialism because it lacked an imperial metropole and was not organized to exploit another territory on behalf of a mother country. A separate, more categorical position rejects the colonial classification outright.

=== Indonesia ===
The transmigration program is an initiative of the Indonesian government to move landless people from densely populated areas of Java, but also to a lesser extent from Bali and Madura, to less populous areas of the country including Papua, Kalimantan, Sumatra, and Sulawesi.

=== Papua New Guinea ===
In 1884, Britain declared a protective order over South East New Guinea, establishing an official colony in 1888. Germany however, annexed parts of the North. This annexation separated the entire region into the South, known as "The Territory of Papua" and North, known as "German New Guinea".

=== Philippines ===
Due to marginalization produced by continuous Resettlement Policy, by 1969, political tensions and open hostilities developed between the government of the Philippines and Moro Muslim rebel groups in Mindanao.

=== Russian-occupied territories ===
Settler colonization has been documented in Russian-occupied territories of Ukraine and passportization in Russian-occupied territories in Georgia.

=== Western Sahara ===
Some scholars view that Moroccan settlers are settler colonizing Moroccan-occupied Western Sahara, including through the Green March.

=== Subject peoples ===
Many colonists came to colonies for slaves to their colonizing countries, so the legal power to leave or remain may not be the issue so much as the actual presence of the people in the new country. This left the indigenous natives of their lands slaves in their own countries.

The Canadian Indian residential school system was identified by the Truth and Reconciliation Commission (Canada) as colonization through depriving the youth of First Nations in Canada of their languages and cultures.

During the mid 20th century, there was the most dramatic and devastating attempt at colonization, and that was pursued with Nazism. Hitler and Heinrich Himmler and their supporters schemed for a mass migration of Germans to Eastern Europe, where some of the Germans were to become colonists, having control over the native people. These indigenous people were planned to be reduced to slaves or wholly annihilated.

Many advanced nations currently have large numbers of guest workers/temporary work visa holders who are brought in to do seasonal work such as harvesting or to do low-paid manual labor. Guest workers or contractors have a lower status than workers with visas, because guest workers can be removed at any time for any reason.

=== Endo-colonization ===
Colonization may be a domestic strategy when there is a widespread security threat within a nation and weapons are turned inward, as noted by Paul Virilio:

Obsession with security results in the endo-colonization of society: endo-colonization is the use of increasingly powerful and ubiquitous technologies of security turned inward, to attempt to secure the fast and messy circulations of our globalizing, networked society...it is the increasing domination of public life with stories of dangerous otherness and suspicion...

Some instances of the burden of endo-colonization have been noted:

The acute difficulties of the Latin American and southern European military-bureaucratic dictatorships in the seventies and early eighties and the Soviet Union in the late eighties can in large part be attributed to the economic, political and social contradictions induced by endo-colonizing militarism.

== Space colonization ==
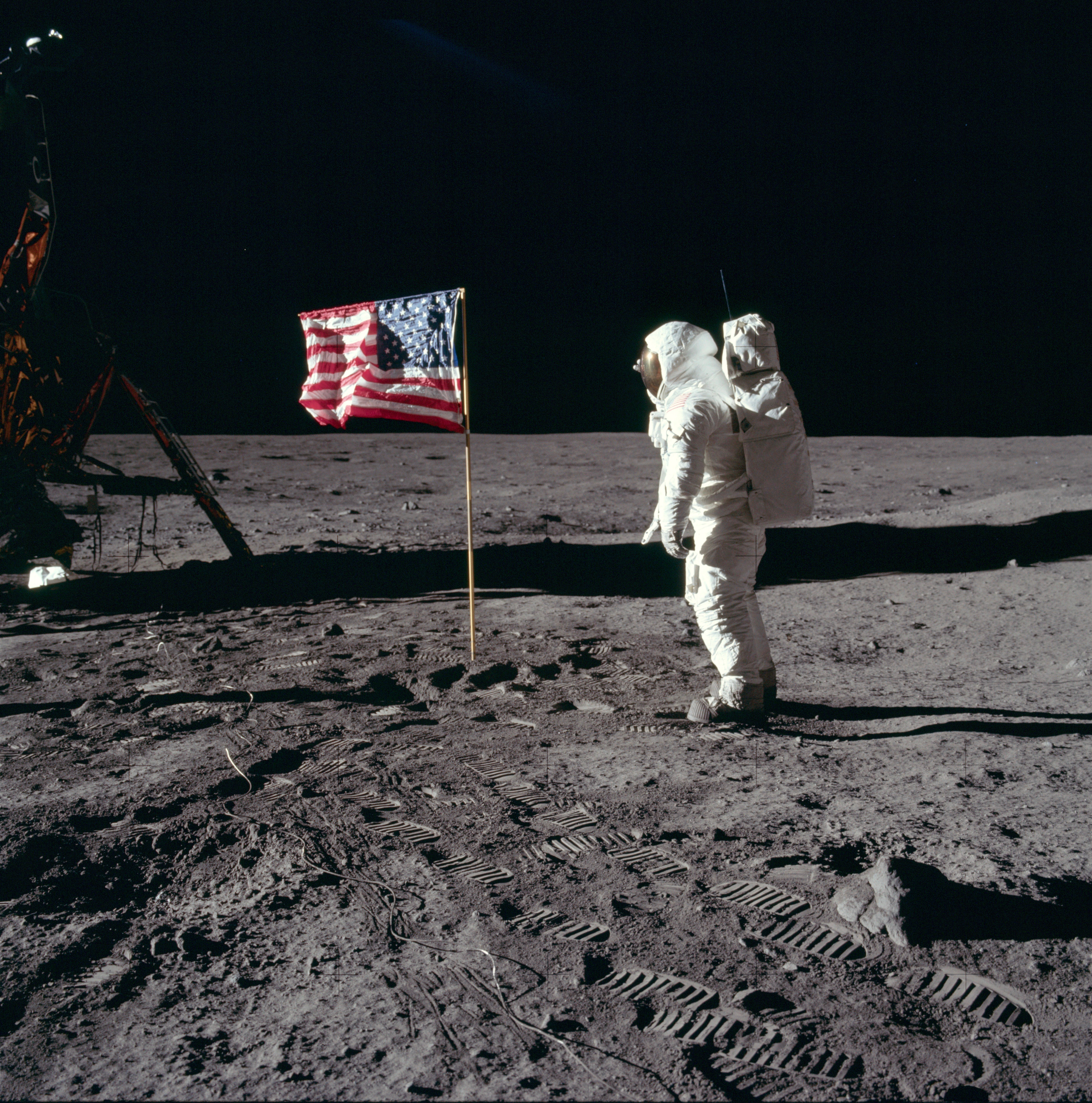
Photo of the first national flag assembled by a human on the Moon (Apollo 11, 1969). With colonization of space having been a critically discussed issue since the dawn of the space age, resulting in the Outer Space Treaty (1967), the flag was not to symbolize any territorial claims.

Space colonization, or extraterrestrial colonization, is the establishment of human settlements or colonies in outer space and on astronomical bodies. The concept, in its broadest sense, has been applied to any permanent human presence in space, such as a space habitat or other extraterrestrial settlements. It may involve notions of territorial occupation, resource control for economic or military purposes, such as extraterrestrial mining, or military practice ground as shown in a space force.

=== By target ===
- Colonization of the asteroid belt
- Colonization of Mars
- Colonization of the Moon
- Colonization of Titan
- Colonization of trans-Neptunian objects
- Space settlement

== See also ==
Colonization

- Colonialism
- Coloniality of gender
- Colonization of Antarctica
- Cocacolonization
- Ocean colonization
- List of colonial empires

Other related

- Colonisation (biology)
- Human settlement
- Imperialism
- Pre-Columbian trans-oceanic contact

== Ideological colonization and related concepts ==
=== Ideological colonization ===
Ideological colonization refers to the imposition of external ideological, cultural, or social frameworks on another society or population. This expression has been used particularly in discussions of cultural influence and modern forms of imperialism.

=== Conversational usage ===
“Thought colonization” functions as a colloquial conversational extension of the term ideological colonization, its primary function is to describe situations in which one participant substantially reconstructs another participants expressed position and then treats that reconstruction as authoritative, even after clarification. The proposed usage overlaps with established work on contextomy and charitable interpretation.

For example, one participant may state that women should be treated equally to men, while another participant interprets this as endorsing violence against women in situations where men might also be subject to violence. Within this proposed usage the issue is not merely disagreement, but the attribution of a substantially altered position to the original speaker.

== Bibliography ==
- Bloom, Etan (2011). Arthur Ruppin and the Production of Pre-Israeli Culture. Brill. ISBN 978-90-04-20379-2.
- Cohen, Michael J. (2011). "Zionism and British imperialism II: Imperial financing in Palestine". Journal of Israeli History: Politics, Society, Culture. 30 (2): 115–139. doi:10.1080/13531042.2011.610119.
- Gelvin, James L. (March 11, 2021). "Zionism and the Colonization of Palestine". The Israel-Palestine Conflict: A History (4th ed.). Cambridge University Press. doi:10.1017/9781108771634. ISBN 978-1-108-77163-4.
- Jabotinsky, Ze'ev (November 4, 1923). "The Iron Wall" (PDF). Archived (PDF) from the original on May 9, 2024.
- Murphy, Emma C. (2005). "Zionism and the Palestine Question". A Companion to the History of the Middle East. John Wiley & Sons. pp. 269–290. doi:10.1002/9780470996423.ch15. ISBN 978-0-470-99642-3.
- Penslar, Derek (October 1993). "Anita Shapira. Land and Power: The Zionist Resort to Force, 1881–1948 . Translated by William Templer. (Studies in Jewish History.) New York: Oxford University Press. 1992. Pp. x, 446. $59.00". The American Historical Review. 98 (4): 1302. doi:10.1086/ahr/98.4.1302.
- Robinson, Shira (2013). Citizen Strangers: Palestinians and the Birth of Israel's Liberal Settler State. Stanford University Press. ISBN 978-0-804-78802-1.
- Yadgar, Yaacov (2017). Sovereign Jews. State University of New York Press. doi:10.1515/97814384653. ISBN 978-1-4384-6535-7.
