= Mihkel Lüdig =

Estonian composer and organist

- Born: 9 May [O.S. 27 April] 1880
- Died: 7 May 1958 (aged 77)
- Occupation: composer

Mihkel Lüdig (9 May [O.S. 27 April] 1880 – 7 May 1958) was an Estonian composer, organist and choir conductor. As a composer, he particularly worked on a cappella choral songs. Lüdig is considered one of the major organisers of large-scale musical events in 20th century Estonia. He was born in Vaskrääma, studied at both Moscow and St. Petersburg conservatories, and was a student of Nicolai Soloviev.

== Events ==
Lüdig initiated and led a number of events:

- the Singing Day of Pärnu in 1903;
- the opening of new building of Vanemuine in 1906;
- the Music Day of Tartu in 1909;
- the seventh Estonian Song Festival in 1910;
- the opening of Endla in 1911.

== Business ==
Lüdig was among the founders of Esto-Muusika, the most successful music supply business in Estonia of the time, and the short-lived monthly journal Helikund, edited by Eduard Visnapuu.

== Career ==
In 1918–1924, Lüdig worked as an organist of the Kaarli kirik.

In 1920–1922, Lüdig was an organ teacher in the Tallinn Higher School of Music, one of whose founders he had been in 1919. Lüdig was also a director of the school in 1919–1923.

In 1925, Lüdig moved to Argentina, hoping to find better work. However, the rumours of lack of organists in Buenos Aires turned out to be severely overblown, so his career there began at the post of an inn pianist; later he also conducted for a local German male choir. In 1929, Lüdig moved back to Estonia. Until 1932, he taught organ playing and played it himself in Tallinn; then, he moved to Pärnu and became a conductor of the Endla society. In 1934–1958 — until his death — he lived and worked in Vändra.

The choral song "Dawn" ("Koit") created by Mihkel Lüdig is traditionally the opening song of Estonian song festivals.

== Personal life ==
Mihkel Lüdig was born as the second child in a family that later had a total of 18 children.

His wife was a soprano Mathilde Lüdig-Sinkel (1882–1953), who moved to Germany in 1939, later to the USA. His son Peeter Paul Lüdig (1906 - 1983), who was a pianist, organist and conductor, also left in 1939 for Germany, later he also lived in the USA.

He died in Vändra.

Awards:

1955 Estonian SSR people's artist

== Sources ==
- Koolielu: Mihkel Lüdig
