= Taavi Kotka =

Estonian businessman

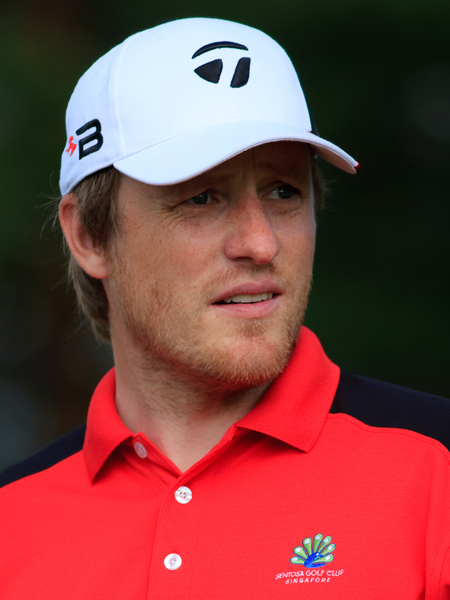
- Born: January 21, 1979 (age 46); Estonia
- Occupation: Founder & CEO of KOOS.io
- Years active: present

Taavi Kotka (born 21 January 1979) is an IT visionary and previously the chief information officer of the Estonian Government known for leading e-residency program. Between years 2005-2012, Kotka was the CEO of Nortal (then named Webmedia), one of the largest software development companies in the Baltic states. Taavi Kotka (alongside Ruth Annus, and Siim Sikkut) proposed "10 million e-residents by 2025" on idea contest by Estonian Development Fund in 2014.

In April 2015, the Vice President of European Commission, Andrus Ansip, assigned Taavi Kotka to be his Special Adviser on Digital Single Market issues and e-Governance.

In 2021, together with Ivo Mägi and Antti Perli, he founded the start-up company KOOS.io. In April 2022, 4 million euros were involved. The new investment round was led by the fund Taavet + Sten, among the investors were Markus Villig, Kaarel Kotkas, Triin Hertmann, Jevgeni Kabanov, etc. In addition to the Estonian funds Superangels, United Angels and Lemonade Stand, British LocalGlobe also joined this circle.

== Biography ==
Kotka started his career as a programmer, rising to be a Managing Director of the largest software development company in the region – Webmedia (now Nortal), one of largest software development companies in Baltic states. As an engineer, he has been the brainpower behind many Estonian e-government innovative initiatives like e-residency (digital citizenship), data embassies, country in the cloud, no-legacy policy, VAT fraud detection etc. He is also a special advisor to European Commission vice-president Andrus Ansip on European Digital Single Market.

== Education ==
Master of Science of Engineering (focus: ICT) and PhD Studies in Tallinn University of Technology. He was the president of the Estonian Association of Information Technology and Telecommunications (ITL) and he was elected as an Entrepreneur of the year in 2011.

== Awards ==
- In 2015, Computerworld awarded Kotka with the "One of the Most Important Technology Leaders" title
- In 2014, Estonian Association of Information and Telecommunications awarded him with the Man of The Year title
- In 2014, ICT Spring awarded Taavi Kotka with the European CIO of the Year 2014 title
- In 2011, Ernst & Young awarded him with the Entrepreneur of the Year title

== Honours ==
- Order of the White Star, III Class, awarded by the President of Estonia, Toomas Hendrik Ilves, 2016
