= Estcoin =

Estonian proposed cryptocurrency

Estcoin was a 2017 proposal for a national cryptocurrency tied to Estonia's e-residency program. The plan was criticized by the European Central Bank President Mario Draghi, who said "no member state can introduce its own currency". In 2018, the Estonian government clarified it was not planning to launch a national cryptocurrency and that it never planned to do so, but would plan to "explore various possibilities" for blockchain technology.

== History ==
Discussions about Estcoin emerged in 2017 amid the rapid growth of cryptocurrencies and initial coin offerings (ICOs). The concept was raised in connection with Estonia's e-Residency programme, which had attracted a growing international user base and prompted debate about the use of blockchain-based tokens in public digital services.

Early commentary described Estcoin as a proposed blockchain-based token linked to digital identity or participation in the e-Residency ecosystem, rather than as a sovereign currency. The proposal received international media attention during broader debates over government experimentation with blockchain technology in the late 2010s.

== Proposed uses ==
In 2017, commentary on Estcoin outlined several hypothetical use cases linked to Estonia's digital governance infrastructure and e-Residency programme. These proposals focused on non-monetary applications, including incentives for participation in the e-Residency ecosystem, access to digital public services, and regulated fundraising mechanisms inspired by initial coin offerings (ICOs).

== See also ==
- e-Residency of Estonia
