= Toomas Annus =

Estonian entrepreneur

Toomas Annus (born 5 October 1960) is an Estonian entrepreneur.

He was born in Kohtla-Järve. In 1984 he graduated from Tallinn Pedagogical Institute with a degree in industrial and civil engineering.

Since 1991 he is the leading figure of the construction company Merko Ehitus.

He has been at the first place of Äripäev's list of 500 the richest persons in Estonia.
