= Radio Factory RET =

Company based in Estonia

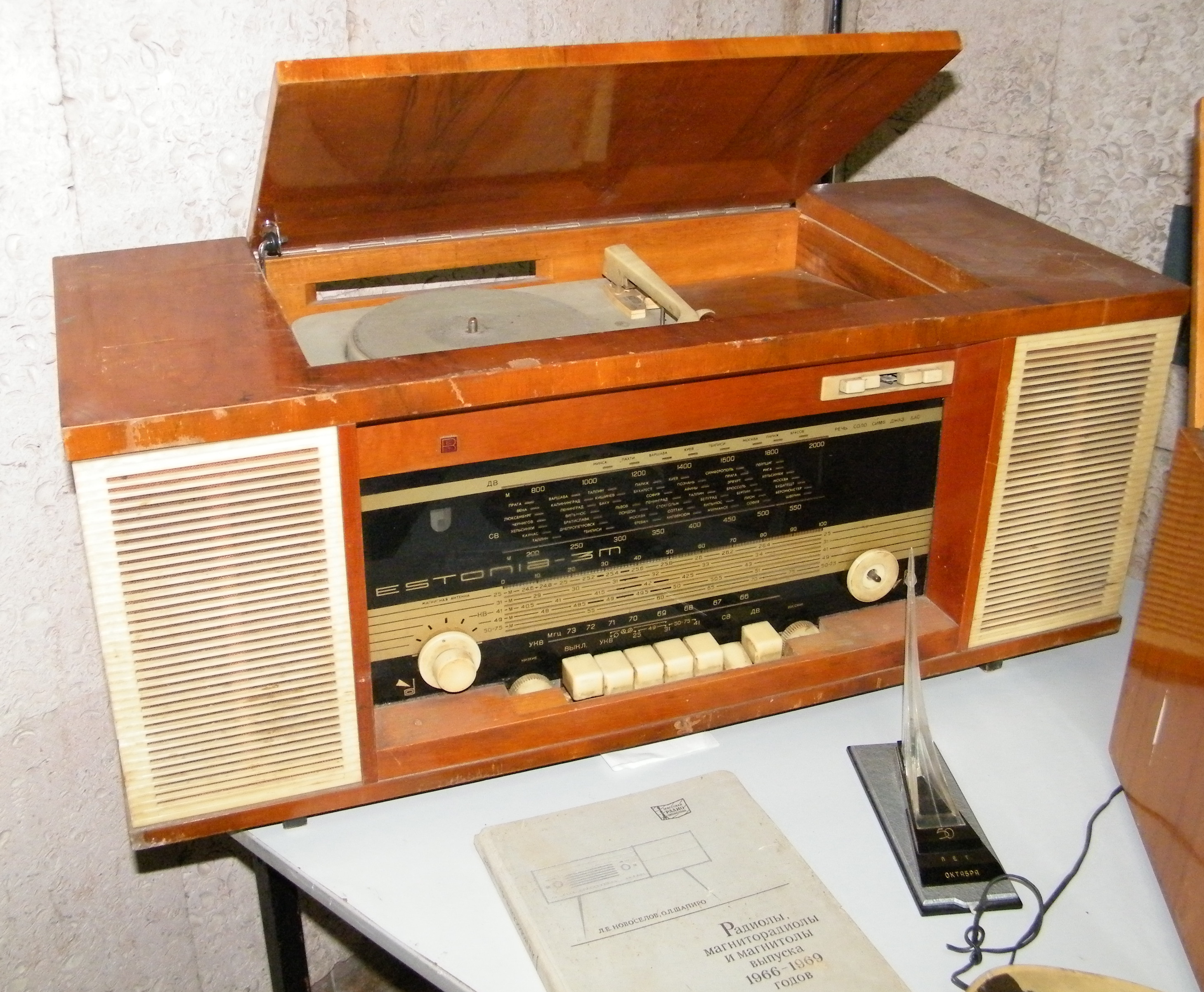
Radio devices "Estonia 3M" was produced in RET

Radio Factory RET (Estonian: Raadio-Elektrotehnika Tehas, abbreviated RET) was an electronics factory in Tallinn, Estonia.

RET was established in 1935. In 1940, the factory was named to "Punane RET" ('Red RET').

During Soviet Estonia, the factory produced military products and high-class radio devices (Estonian: stereoradioola) called "Estonia".

In 1993, the factory was closed.
