= Icosagen (company) =

Company based in Tartu, Estonia

- Type: Privately held company
- Industry: Biotechnology, Biopharmaceutical industry
- Founded: 1999
- Headquarters: Tartu, Estonia
- Key people: Mart Ustav: Founder and CEO
- Services: Antibody discovery, antibody development, protein production, GMP manufacturing, cell line development, upstream and downstream process development
- Website: www.icosagen.com

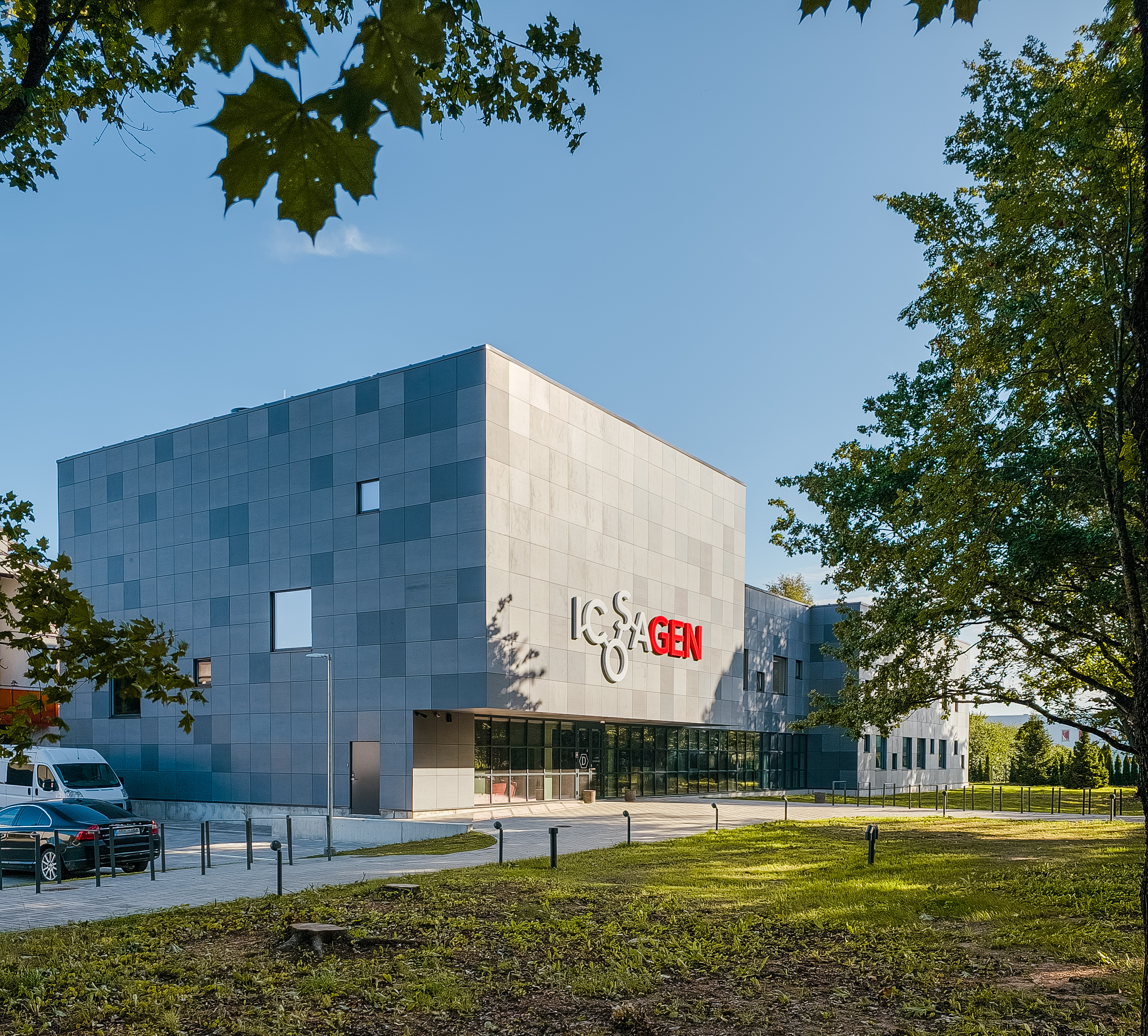
Icosagen main entrance

Icosagen (formerly Quattromed AS) is an Estonian biotechnology company providing custom research programs and services to the Biopharmaceutical industry, including antibody discovery, protein production, and GMP manufacturing. Formed in 1999 as Quattromed AS, it was renamed Icosagen in 2009.

== Profile ==
Icosagen, based in Tartu, Estonia, is a biotechnology company that focuses on providing antibody discovery, protein production, GMP manufacturing, and related services. The company employs over 200 full-time staff. Icosagen's activities are divided into several key branches: antibody discovery, protein production, GMP manufacturing, and cell line development. Antibody discovery, development and production, particularly in targeting challenging membrane proteins such as G protein-coupled receptors (GPCRs) and solute carrier (SLC) transporters are key services. The company also develops stable CHO cell lines for the production of therapeutic proteins and antibodies, supporting clients from research and development through to clinical stages.

== History ==
Icosagen AS was originally established as Quattromed by Marika Mikelsaar, Helme Raukas, Ain Laving, and Mart Ustav in 1999. The company focus was developing molecular genetic methods for detecting infectious diseases, including papillomavirus, herpes, and hepatitis.

By 2008, Quattromed had become the largest diagnostics company in Estonia, employing 80 people. That year, the diagnostics division was sold, leading to the formation of Synlab Eesti OÜ. The remaining biotechnology segment was rebranded as Icosagen, shifting its core business to contract work for the development of biopharmaceuticals.

In 2015, Icosagen Technologies Inc. was established in a U.S. expansion. By 2022, Icosagen's turnover had risen to €20 million.

In February 2023, Icosagen secured an €18 million loan from the European Investment Bank, backed by the InvestEU program, to enhance its R&D capabilities and construct a new cGMP production facility. The 1,600 m² plant, expected to become operational in 2024, aims to bolster the biological drug industry in Estonia.

In March 2023, Icosagen acquired the Carterra LSA platform to enhance its high-throughput antibody screening capabilities, facilitating the discovery and development of new therapeutic and diagnostic antibodies.

In October 2023, Icosagen entered into a multi-target antibody research agreement with Salipro Biotech to advance drug discovery programs against challenging membrane proteins, including G protein-coupled receptors (GPCRs) and solute carrier (SLC) transporters.

In May 2024, Icosagen announced a strategic partnership with Lead Discovery Center GmbH to discover novel monoclonal antibodies, leveraging both organizations' expertise in antibody research and development.

In July 2024, research involving Icosagen demonstrated that anti-SARS-CoV-2 antibodies in a nasal spray efficiently blocked viral transmission between Ferrets, indicating potential for preventing COVID-19 spread.
