= Paikuse Parish =

Former municipality of Estonia

Coordinates: 58°23′N 24°37′E

Paikuse Parish Paikuse vald
- Former municipality of Estonia
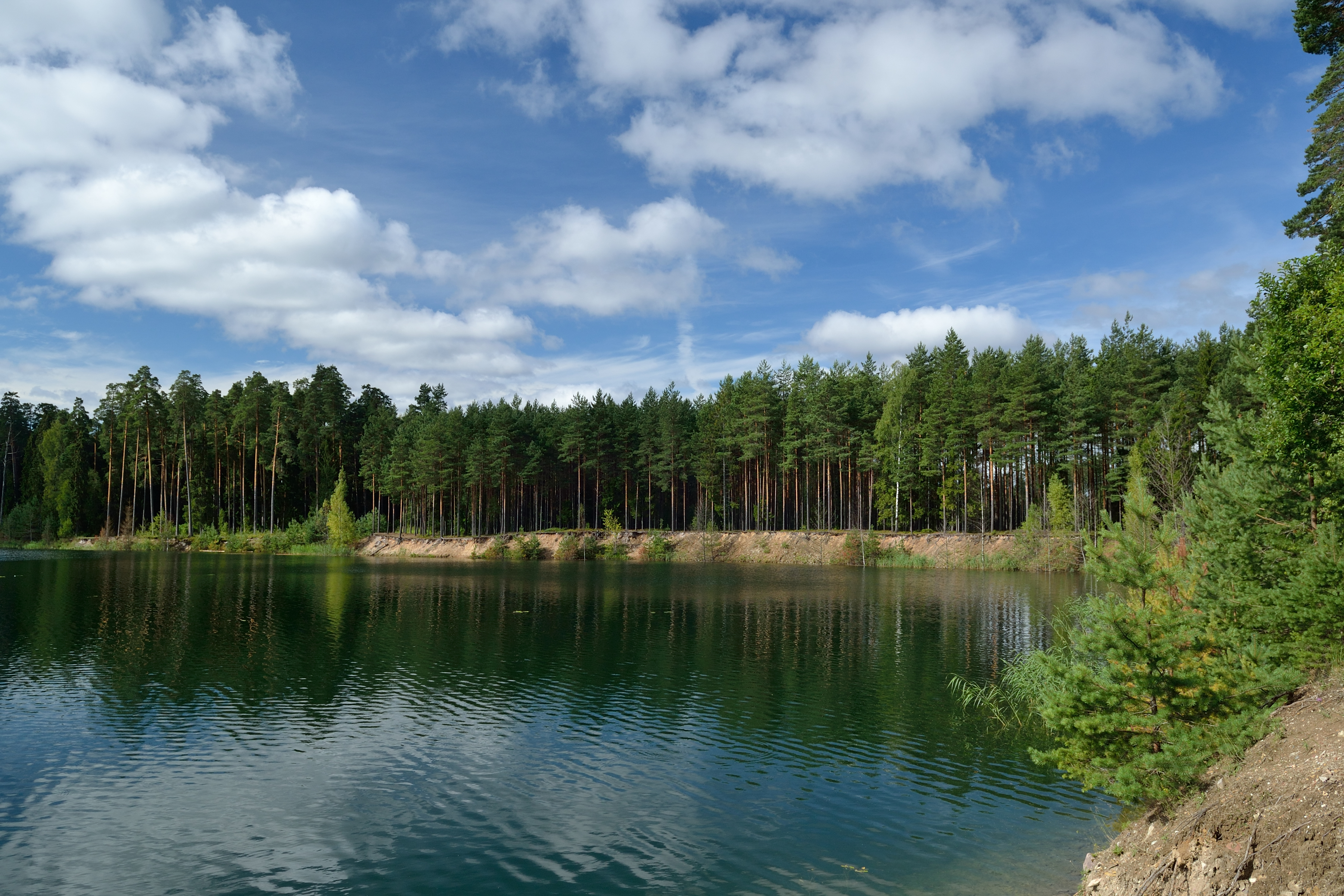
- Seljametsa lake

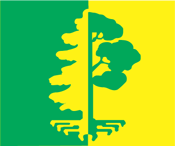
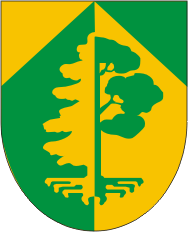
- Flag Coat of arms

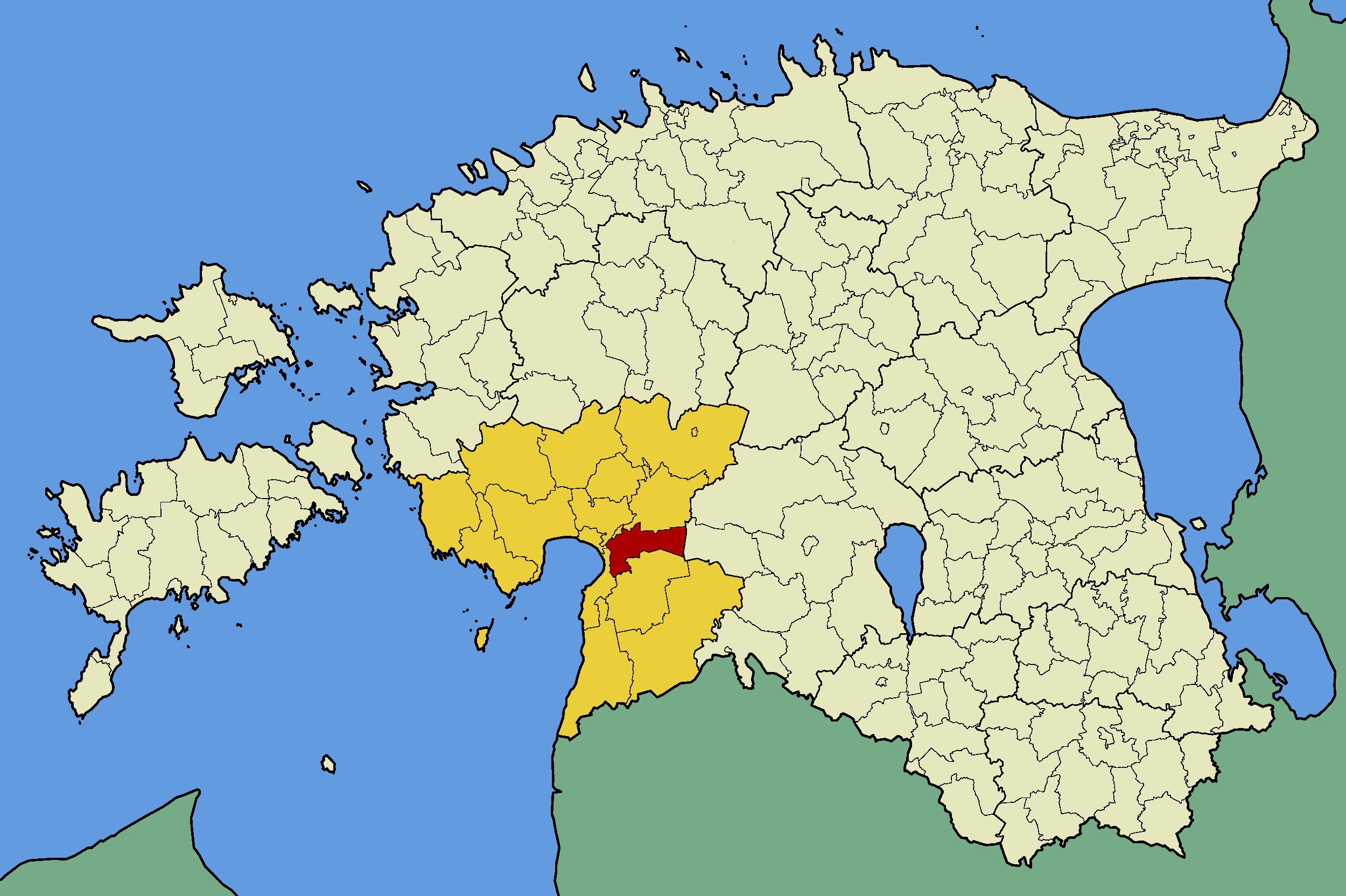
- Paikuse Parish within Pärnu County.
- Country: Estonia
- County: Pärnu County
- Administrative centre: Paikuse

Area
  - Total: 177 km^{2} (68 sq mi)

Population (01.01.2006)
  - Total: 3,021
  - Density: 17.1/km^{2} (44.2/sq mi)
- Website: www.paikuse.ee

Paikuse was a municipality located in Pärnu County, one of the 15 counties of Estonia.

== Settlements ==
Borough

Paikuse

Villages

Põlendmaa, Seljametsa, Silla, Tammuru, Vaskrääma.
