= Nortal =

Estonian technology company

- Type: Private
- Industry: Business transformation, Government contractor, IT consulting
- Founded: Tartu, Estonia (incorporated 2000)
- Headquarters: Tallinn, Estonia
- Area served: Worldwide
- Key people: Priit Alamäe (CEO)
- Revenue: € 224.2 million (2023)
- Number of employees: 2000+ (2025)
- Website: nortal.com

Nortal is a multinational strategic change and technology company headquartered in Tallinn, Estonia, with operations in the UK, US, Canada, Mexico, Europe, the Middle East and Africa.

Nortal provides public sector and private sector clients data-driven business transformation. Most notably a large part of the digitalization of Estonia's governmental e-services has been planned and implemented by Nortal and its Estonian predecessor Webmedia. Nortal is a keen promoter of good governance through e-government focusing on removing obstacles of human development, reducing hidden transaction costs in societies, increasing transparency of administration, reducing waste and increasing overall procedural efficiency.

== History ==
Nortal was established in 2000 under the name Webmedia in Tartu, Estonia. The company began its journey focusing on web development and quickly grew in prominence within the region. By 2006, Webmedia expanded its operations to Lithuania, Romania and Serbia, doubling its workforce. In 2008, Webmedia opened a branch office in Qatar and received a recognition from Deloitte & Touché, which ranked Webmedia among the 30 fastest-growing companies in Central and Eastern Europe, and among the 500 fastest-growing technology companies in the EMEA region. In 2010, Webmedia acquired the healthcare unit of Cybernetica AS, adding laboratory information system to eHealth product line. The following year in 2011, Webmedia Group AS acquired Finnish CCC Corporation Oy, a systems' development partner for telecommunication, shipping and industrial companies, resulting in the largest software development company in the Baltics, and they rebranded into Nortal.

In 2012, Nortal helped create the electronic financial management platform GIFMIS (Government Integrated Financial Management and Information System) for the federal government of Nigeria, an integral part of the Treasury Single Account (TSA) financial policy, going on to save N153 billion and uncover about 46,000 ghost workers by 2013. Nortal was also the IT-partner for the first Estonian e-census in which 66% of the population participated over the internet. One of the founding members, Taavi Kotka left Nortal to become the first Chief Information Officer of the Estonian government and one of the founders of the e-Residency program.

In 2016, Nortal acquired marketing automation and lead management company Element, based in Stockholm, Sweden. The same year, Nortal Group shareholders bought back 50% of Group shares from Enterprise Investors and LHV Pension Funds, regaining full ownership of the company.

In 2018, Nortal opens an office in Düsseldorf, Germany and acquires U.S. Company Dev9, expanding its North American footprint. In 2020, Nortal announced selling off its marketing automation division in Sweden via a management buyout. The company acquired Schütze AG, a leading strategic consulting and software engineering company in Germany.

In 2022, Nortal acquired Skelia in Poland and Ukraine and launched the daughter company Pwrteams as well as establishing operations in Canada. In 2023, Nortal expanded into the UK and established a delivery center in Guadalajara, Mexico. The company also acquired Questers in Bulgaria, merging it with Pwrteams.

In 2024, Nortal expanded into Austria and acquired the UK cybersecurity and defense company 3DOT Solutions.

== Spin-off businesses ==
Over the years Nortal has been the start for several spin-off businesses, which continue to operate as separate companies, such as:

- ZeroTurnaround
- Plumbr
- eInvoices Centre
- OpenText ECM
- Leanest Ltd.

== Areas of expertise ==
Among some of its most noteworthy projects are also the electronic financial management platform GIFMIS for the federal government of Nigeria, e-tax system for Botswana Unified Revenue Service (BURS) and Invest Easy, major government e-services portal for the Sultanate of Oman. Invest Easy is widely acknowledged and awarded EODB (ease of doing business) project that has had substantial impact on local business environment and climate in Oman. Following successful launch and implementation of Invest Easy portal, Oman made an unprecedented leap in the Ease of Doing Business Ranking of World Bank's annual Doing Business 2017 report, jumping 127 places in category ’Starting a Business’ compared to previous year. Invest Easy has also been awarded: H H Sheikh Salem al Ali al Sabah Informatics Award 2016 in the Government category; Al Roya Economic Award for Best Government to Business e-service; GCC e-Government Award for Best Government to Business e-service etc. UNCTAD (GER.co rating) rated Invest Easy portal in Oman with a perfect score of 10/10, naming it one of the five best government-to-business (G2B) solutions in the world.

Among other examples, in Germany the company launched an award-winning pilot to manage digital prescriptions, paired with medical video consultations in the federal state of Hessen, together with Optica and other partners.

== Operations ==
Since the founding of the company in 2000, Nortal's solutions have been implemented in 60 countries across three continents. Nortal has 15 home markets – Estonia, Finland, Lithuania, Oman, UAE, Germany, United States,Serbia, Mexico, Poland, Saudi Arabia, Canada, the United Kingdom and Austria.

== People ==
The company has been owned entirely by employees since 2016. The chairman of the board of Nortal is Priit Alamäe. The management board members include Andre Krull, and Neringa Narbutiene.
