= ZeroTurnaround =

Company based in Estonia

ZeroTurnaround AS
- Type: Private
- Industry: Software development tools
- Founded: 2007
- Defunct: 2017-11-29
- Headquarters: Tartu, Estonia; Boston, Massachusetts
- Key people: Jevgeni Kabanov, Founder, CEO; Toomas Römer, Founder, CTO
- Products: JRebel; XRebel; JRebel for Android; XRebel Hub (Beta)
- Revenue: $2.5M (2011); $6.5M (2012)
- Website: www.jrebel.com

ZeroTurnaround was a Java development tools software company founded by Jevgeni Kabanov and Toomas Römer in 2007. It was acquired by Rogue Wave Software in 2017. In January 2019, Rogue Wave Software and the legacy ZeroTurnaround software products were acquired by Minneapolis, Minnesota-based application software developer Perforce.

== History ==
Founders Jevgeni Kabanov and Toomas Römer met at IT services provider Webmedia (now known as Nortal) in Tartu, Estonia and began to work together on the project in 2007. Jevgeni and Toomas met David Booth at industry conferences, brought him on as a marketing consultant in January 2009, and promoted him to CEO by March. Together they spun the company out as ZeroTurnaround and received funding by Webmedia in 2009.

The project yielded not only this commercial enterprise, but was also the center of Kabanov's Ph.D. thesis under his advisor Varmo Vene, Head of the Institute of Computer Science at the University of Tartu. His thesis title was Towards a more productive Java EE ecosystem. As of 2014, and according to Kabanov, the product is in use at 3,500 organizations in 80 countries.

On March 19, 2013, ZeroTurnaround announced they acquired Javeleon, a software company spun out of the Maersk McKinney Moeller Institute at the University of Southern Denmark. Javeleon makes productivity tools for Java developers.

On November 29, 2017, ZeroTurnaround was acquired by Rogue Wave Software.

In January 2019, Rogue Wave Software including the former ZeroTurnaround product JRebel was acquired by Minneapolis, Minnesota-based application software developer Perforce.

== Products ==
ZeroTurnaround developed JRebel, a Java integrated development environment plugin that eliminates the build and redeploy phases of the Java EE development cycle. The company referred to this technology as "hotpatching" or sometimes "dynamic app reloading." It also developed LiveRebel, a rollout/rollback tool for live applications. The technology was based on a proprietary code versioning facility. LiveRebel was discontinued in 2014.

== Funding ==
The company received seed funding of $0.38M in 2008/9 from Webmedia, and a Series A round in 2011 followed by further investment of $2.7M in January 2014, both led by Bain Capital Ventures. It borrowed a further $3M in March 2014 from Western Technology Investment.
