= Vaskrääma =

Village in Estonia

- Village
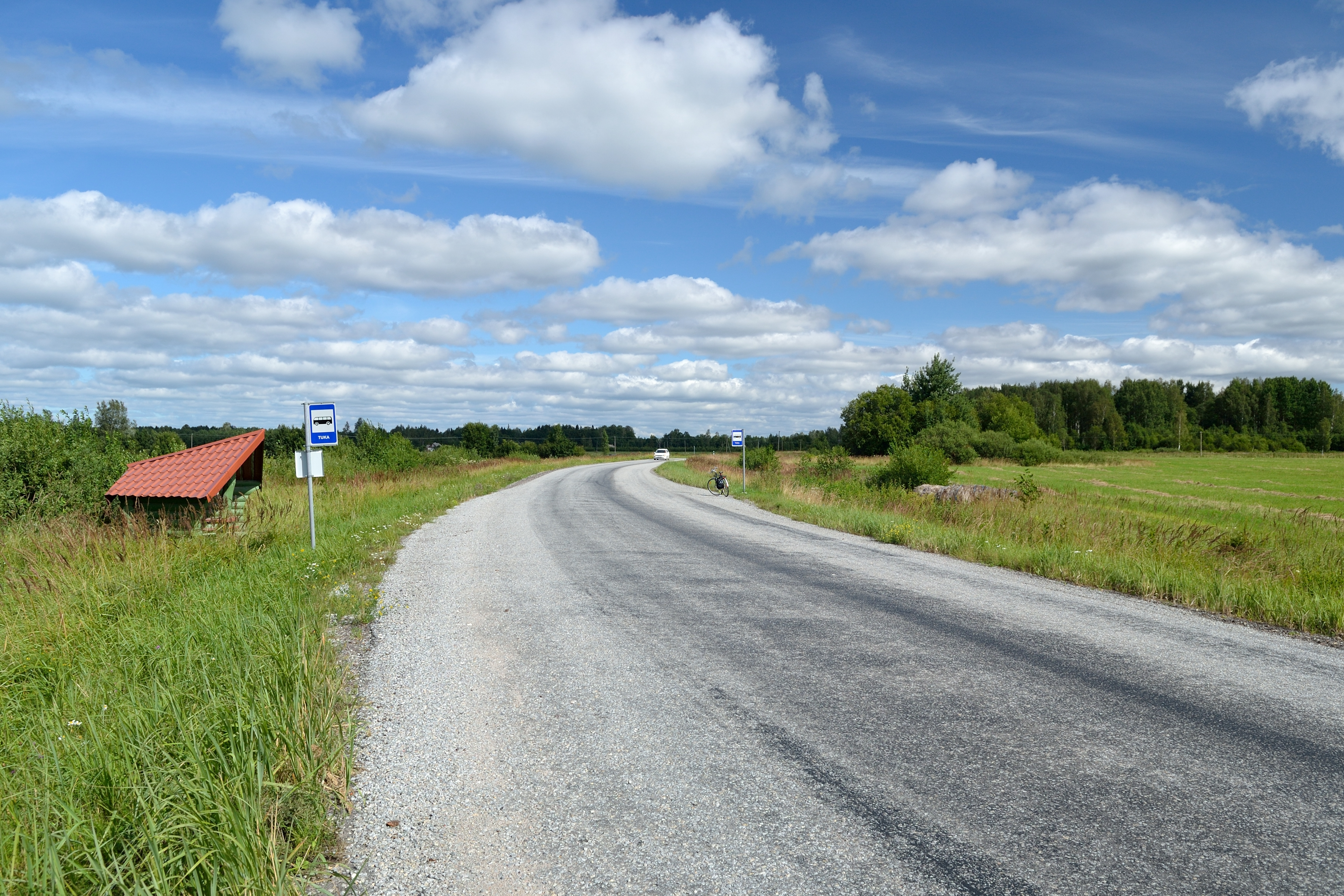

- Location within Estonia
- Coordinates: 58°18′28″N 24°38′28″E
- Country: Estonia
- County: Pärnu County
- Municipality: Pärnu municipality

Area
  - Total: 13.7 km^{2} (5.3 sq mi)

Population (2020)
  - Total: 80
- Time zone: UTC+2 (EET)
  - Summer (DST): UTC+3 (EEST)

Vaskrääma (German: Waldhof) is a village in Pärnu municipality, Pärnu County in southwestern Estonia.

Before the 2017 Administrative reform, the village belonged to Paikuse Parish.

The Estonian composer, organist and choir conductor Mihkel Lüdig (1880–1958), was born in Vaskrääma.

Until 2008, the Pärnu–Mõisaküla railway passed through the territory of the village, where the Vaskrääma railway station used to be.
