= FITkit (hardware) =

Educational computer

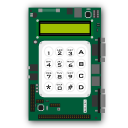

Hardware
- MCU: MSP430 (Texas Instruments)
- FPGA: Spartan 3 XC3S50-4PQ208C
- USB interface: FTDI FT2232C

I/O
- Audio interface
- PS2 connectors
- RS-232 connector
- Keyboard
- Line LCD
- Expansion connectors
- License: BSD licenses
- Website: http://merlin.fit.vutbr.cz/FITkit

FITkit was a hardware platform used for educational purposes at the Brno University of Technology in the Czech Republic.

== FITkit ==
The FITkit contains a low-power microcontroller, a field programmable gate array chip (FPGA) and a set of peripherals. Utilizing advanced reconfigurable hardware, the FITkit may be modified to suit various tasks.

Configuration of the FPGA chip can be specified using the VHDL hardware description language (i.e. VHSIC hardware description language).

Software for the Microcontroller is written in C and compiled using the GNU Compiler Collection. Configuration of the FPGA chip is synthesized from the source VHDL code using professional design tools, which are also available free of charge.

== Use in education ==
The FITkit served as an educational tool in several courses throughout the bachelor's and master's degree programmes. Students were expected to create an FPGA interpreter design of a simple programming language (such as Brainfuck) as part of the Design of Computer Systems course.

The FITKit was obsoleted sometime around 2021 mainly due to the software obsolescence.

== Licensing ==
The project was developed as an open-source (software) and open-core (hardware), under the BSD license.

== Related projects ==
- QDevKit, multiplatform development environment for FITkit (Linux, BSD and Microsoft Windows operating systems)
