= Toivo Annus =

Estonian engineer and investor (1972–2020)

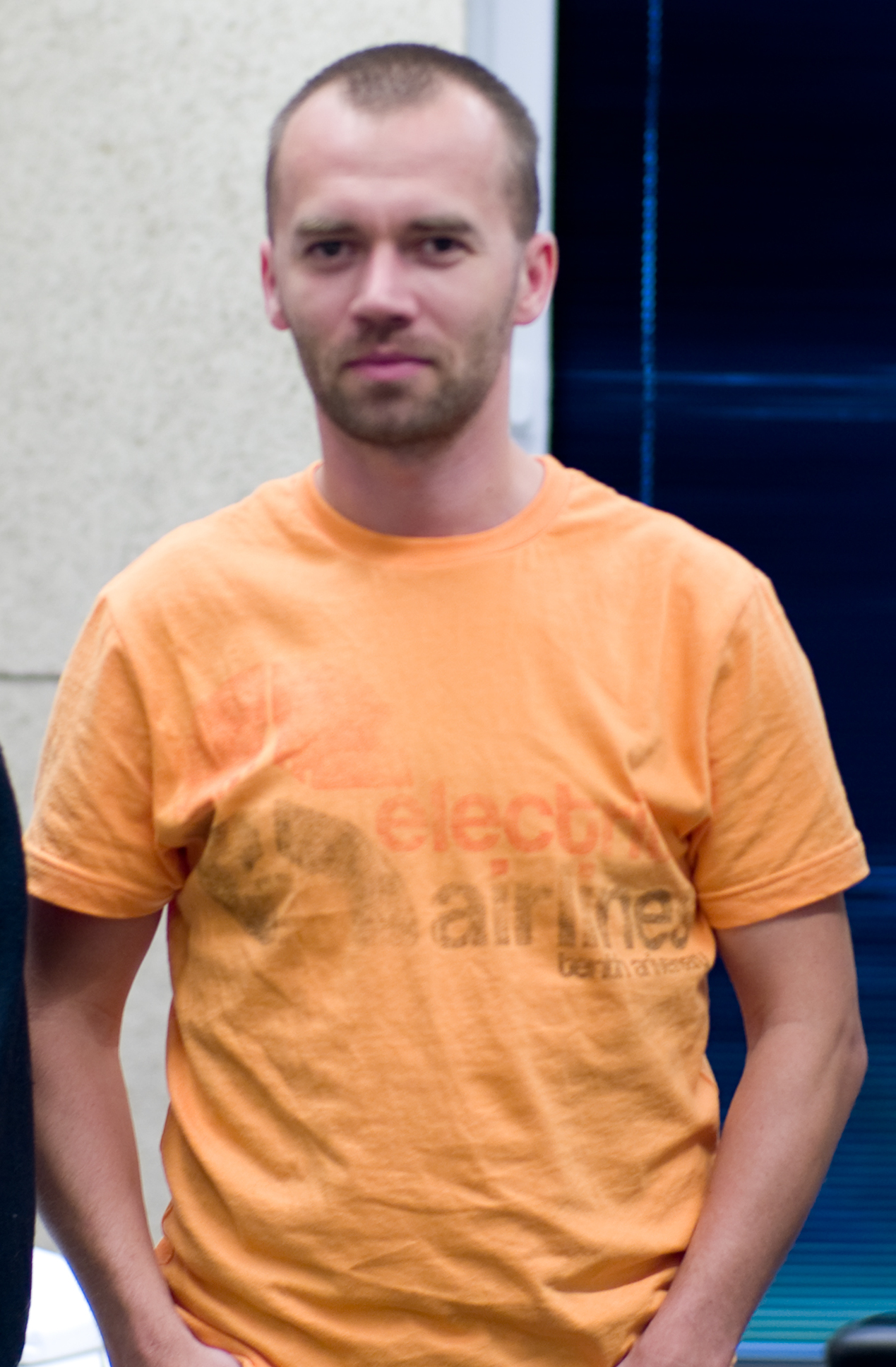
- Born: 7. November 1971; Estonia
- Died: 12 July 2020 (aged 48)
- Education: Tallinn University of Technology
- Occupations: Engineer, Investor

Toivo Annus (1972 – 12 July 2020) was an Estonian engineer and investor. He was one of the founders of Skype, an early internet telecommunications application. Skype became the first unicorn business founded in Estonia, and was sold to eBay for $2.6bn in September 2005. In 2010, Annus' contribution was recognised with the award of the Order of the White Star, 5th Class, by the president of Estonia.

== Biography ==
Annus studied for a mixed MBA/Computer Science degree at Tallinn Technical University before managing multiple small ICT teams and projects. He led the engineering aspects of Skype from its startup until its acquisition. Subsequently, Annus and his co-founders from Skype started Ambient Sound Investments, a private asset management company, which funded more than 50 early stage new ventures worldwide. The assets of this company were reported to have grown 17.5% year on year during 2018 EUR131 million.

On 13 July 2020, Annus' wife issued a press release announcing that her husband had died of an unexpected illness.
