= Colonization of trans-Neptunian objects =

Proposed concepts for the human colonization of trans-Neptunian objects

Artist's rendering of the Kuiper belt and Oort cloud.

Freeman Dyson proposed that trans-Neptunian objects, rather than planets, are the major potential habitat of life in space. Several hundred billion to trillion comet-like ice-rich bodies exist outside the orbit of Neptune, in the Kuiper belt and Inner and Outer Oort cloud. These may contain all the ingredients for life (water ice, ammonia, and carbon-rich compounds), including significant amounts of deuterium and helium-3. Since Dyson's proposal, the number of trans-Neptunian objects known has increased greatly.

Colonists could live in the dwarf planet's icy crust or mantle, using fusion or geothermal heat and mining the soft-ice or liquid inner ocean for volatiles and minerals. Given the light gravity and resulting lower pressure in the ice mantle or inner ocean, colonizing the rocky core's outer surface might give colonists the largest number of mineral and volatile resources as well as insulating them from cold. Surface habitats or domes are another possibility, as background radiation levels are likely to be low.

Colonists of such bodies could also build rotating habitats or live in dug-out spaces and light them with fusion reactors for thousands to millions of years before moving on. Dyson and Carl Sagan envisioned that humanity could migrate to neighbouring star systems, which have similar clouds, by using natural objects as slow interstellar vessels with substantial natural resources; and that such interstellar colonies could also serve as way-stations for faster, smaller interstellar ships. Alternatively Richard Terra has proposed using the materials from the Oort-cloud objects to build vast starlight collecting arrays to power habitats, thus making an Oort-cloud community essentially independent of its central star and fusion fuel supplies.

== Bibliography ==
- Freeman Dyson, "The World, the Flesh, and the Devil", Third J.D. Bernal Lecture, May 1972, reprinted in Communication with Extraterrestrial Intelligence, Carl Sagan, ed., MIT Press, 1973, ISBN 0-262-69037-3
- Richard P. Terra, "Islands in the Sky: Human Exploration and Settlement of the Oort Cloud", in Islands in the Sky: Bold New Ideas for Colonizing Space, Stanley Schmidt and Robert Zubrin, eds. Wiley, 1996, ISBN 0-471-13561-5
- Ben R. Finney and Eric M. Jones, eds., Interstellar Migration and the Human Experience, University of California Press, 1986, ISBN 0-520-05898-4
- David G. Stephenson, "Comets and Interstellar Travel", in Journal of the British Interplanetary Society, 36, 1983, pp. 210–214.
