= Aqris =

Defunct Estonian software company

Coordinates: 59°26′18.7″N 24°44′3.7″E

Aqris Software AS
- Aqris Logo
- Company type: Public
- Industry: Software Development
- Founded: 1999
- Headquarters: Tallinn, Estonia
- Key people: Oliver Wihler – CEO; Sander Mägi – CEO
- Website: www.aqris.com

Aqris was an Estonian software development company located in Tallinn, founded in 1999 by Oliver Wihler and Sander Mägi.

The company was known in the Java developer community for its product RefactorIT, an open source refactor plugin for Java IDEs (Eclipse, Sun ONE Studio, Borland Software's JBuilder, Oracle's JDeveloper, NetBeans and Emacs).
