= Mart Ustav =

Estonian biomedical scientist, entrepreneur

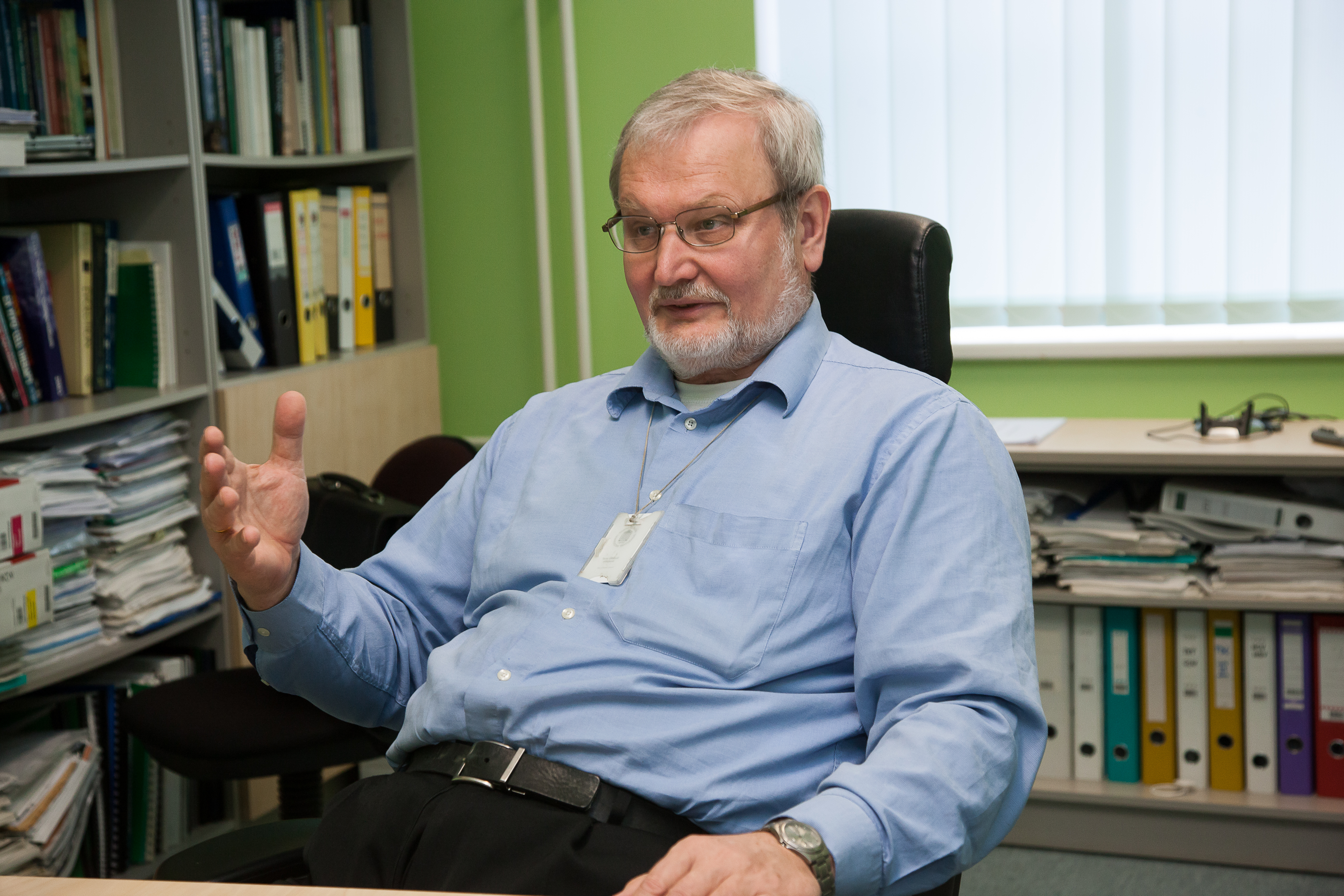
- Born: July 12, 1949 (age 77)
- Education: Tartu State University
- Known for: Research on papillomavirus, gene vectors, DNA vaccines, viral vectors
- Awards: Order of the White Star, III Class (2001)
- Scientific career
- Fields: Biomedical science
- Workplaces: University of Tartu

Mart Ustav (born 12 July 1949) is an Estonian biomedical scientist.

Ustav was born Cherlak, Russian SFSR to Estonian parents who had been deported by Soviet authorities. The family were permitted to return to Estonia in 1956, following the death of Joseph Stalin and the Khrushchev Thaw. He attended primary and secondary schools in Tartu and graduated from the Department of Physics and Chemistry of Tartu State University in 1972. In 1979, he defended his doctoral degree in chemistry from the board of the Institute of Molecular Biology and Genetics of the National Academy of Sciences of Ukraine.

He is teaching at the University of Tartu's Institute of Technology (since 2007 professor). His research interests have included the study of the papillomavirus, including its symbiosis with the host cell and molecular biology, the molecular basis for the episomal persistence of gene vectors in the development of a new generation of safe DNA vaccines, and the design of viruses and viral vectors.

From 2009 until 2014, he was the vice-president of Estonian Academy of Sciences.

In 2001, he was awarded with Order of the White Star, III class.
