= Ruth Annus =

Estonian civil servant and e-Residency specialist

Ruth Annus (born 19 April 1973 in Tallinn) is an Estonian civil servant, translator and E-Residency of Estonia specialist.

Annus began her career as a translator. From the 1990s, she has translated works by authors such as Agatha Christie, Dick Francis, Sandra Brown, John Galsworthy, Simon Hawke, Habberton, John, Charlotte Hughes, Thomas Keneally, Norma Klein, and Una-Mary Parker from English to Estonian.

In 2007, she graduated from the University of Tartu.

Since 2001, she has worked at different positions in Ministry of the Interior.

In 2020, she was awarded with Order of the White Star, IV class.
