= Publishing House ERSEN =

Estonian publishing company

Publishing House ERSEN is one of the largest book publishers in Estonia.

The company cooperates with major English-language publishers and literary agencies to publish English and other titles in Estonia and the European Union.
