= Seljametsa =

Village in Estonia

Coordinates: 58°22′N 24°40′E

- Village
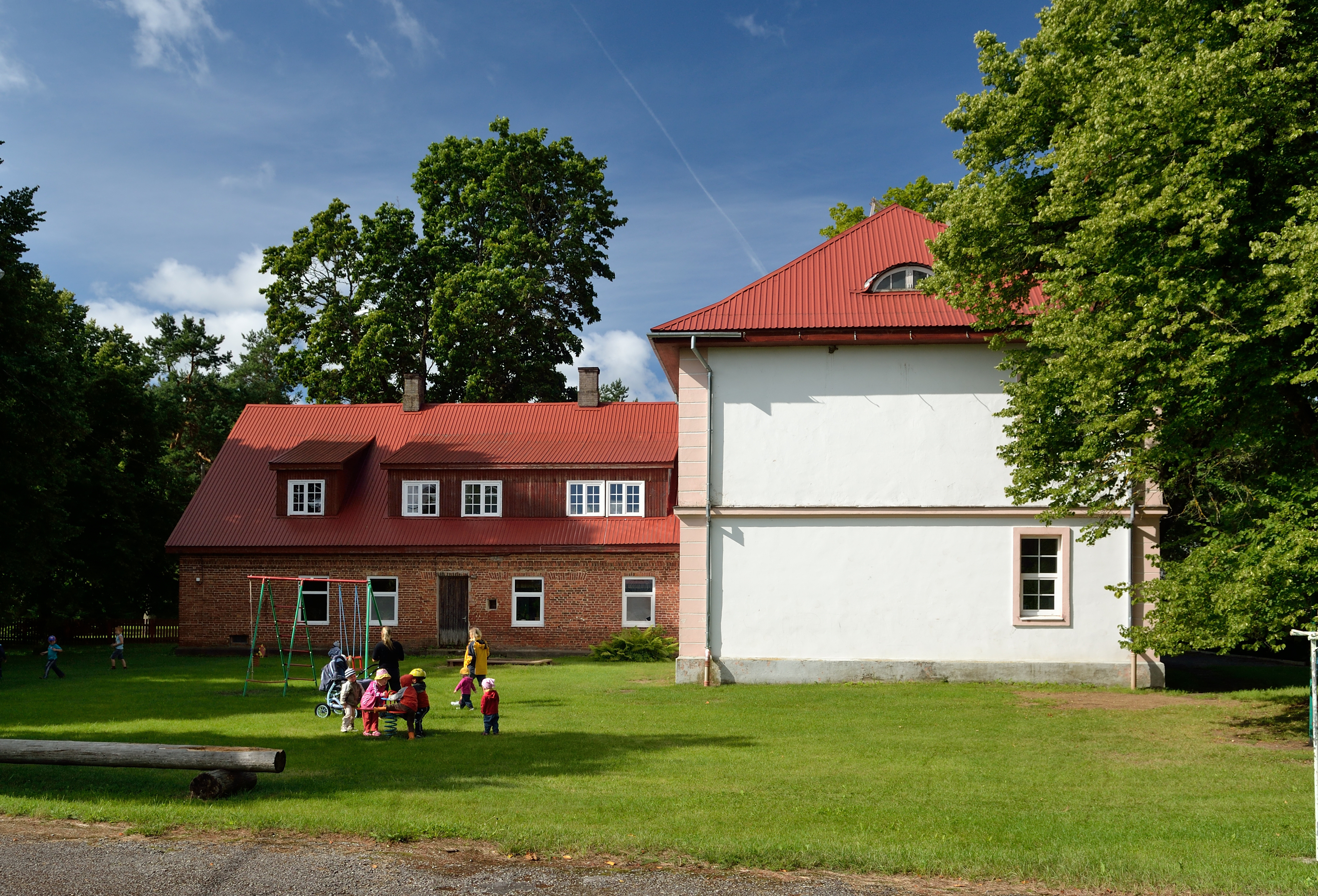
- Seljametsa kindergarten and primary school
- Interactive map of Seljametsa
- Country: Estonia
- County: Pärnu County
- Parish: Pärnu (urban municipality)
- Time zone: UTC+2 (EET)
  - Summer (DST): UTC+3 (EEST)

Seljametsa is a village in Pärnu urban municipality, Pärnu County in southwestern Estonia. Prior to the administrative reform of Estonian local governments in 2017, the village belonged to Paikuse Parish.

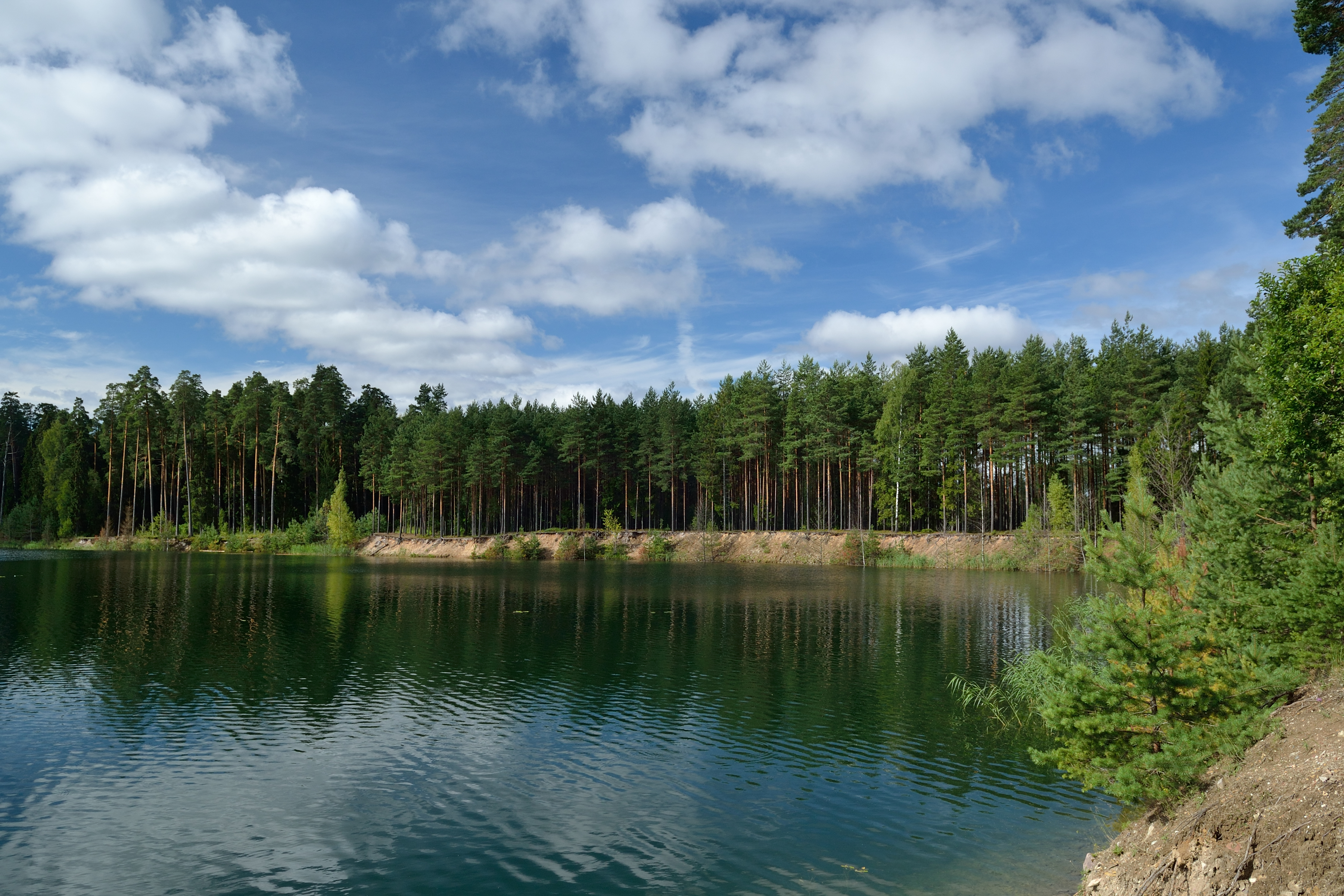
Seljametsa Lake
