= Epp Annus =

Estonian writer and literary scholar

Epp Annus (born 30 August 1969 in Tallinn) is an Estonian writer and literary scholar.

In 2002, she graduated from the University of Tartu, studying Estonian literature. Her doctoral thesis topic was "Kuidas kirjutada aega".

== Works ==
- 2007: novel "Sina, Matilda"
- children books: "Jaak ja lumi", "Jaak läheb poodi", "Oravaraamat", "Oravalapsed vanas majas", "Oravalapsed talvises metsas", "Mari päev", "Oskar läheb õue", "Unelaul kahel häälel", "Väike lumehelbeke", "Täheraamat"
