= E-Residency of Estonia =

Estonian virtual residency program

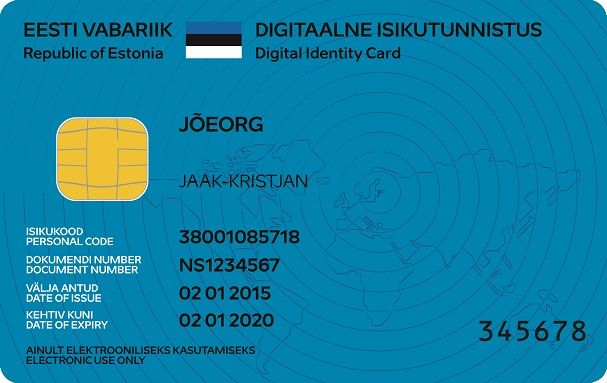
e-Residency identity card

e-Residency of Estonia (also called virtual residency or E-residency) is a program launched by Estonia on 1 December 2014. The program allows non-Estonians access to Estonian services such as company formation, banking, payment processing, and taxation. The program gives the e-resident a smart card which they can use to sign documents. The program is aimed towards location-independent entrepreneurs such as software developers and writers. The first e-resident of Estonia was British journalist Edward Lucas; the first person to apply for and be granted e-residency through the standard process was Hamid Tahsildoost from the United States.

== Application ==
An application for e-residency can be made online by filling in a form, supplying a scan of a national passport and a photograph, and giving the reason for applying (which does not strongly affect the outcome of the application). Kaspar Korjus, former managing director of the e-residency program, said that applicants who had been involved in financial misbehaviour such as money laundering would be rejected. Successful applicants would be invited to an interview in Tallinn or an Estonian embassy about three months after applying, and would then, if successful, be issued their card. The certificates of the document are valid for five years, up from three years when the program was first announced. After that period, if a person wishes to continue using e-services, they have to apply for a new document. The application process will be the same as when they first applied. A state fee needs to be paid again when they submit a new application.

== Benefits and limitations of e-residency ==
E-residents will have their financial footprint monitored digitally, in a manner stated to be transparent; the reaction to the widespread financial misbehaviour at a high level revealed by the Panama Papers leak was suggested to be a factor helping the more transparent Estonian initiative according to Korjus. E-residency itself does not have an effect on income taxation – neither does it establish an income tax liability in Estonia nor does it relieve from income taxation in the resident's home country.

E-residency allows company registration, document signing, encrypted-document exchange, online banking, tax declaration, and fulfilment of medical prescriptions. Other services become available as the scheme is expanded. A digital ID smart card issued by the Estonian Police and Border Guard Board in Estonia or at an embassy is used for access to services.

Entrepreneurs can obtain EU residency after purchasing real estate in Estonia as a long-term benefit. The Estonian side benefits in particular by developing Estonia into an international business center with expanding service offerings for foreign entrepreneurs and investors in the disciplines of finance, consulting, accounting, and law.

Korjus said that registering an Estonian business was "useful for internet entrepreneurs in emerging markets who don’t have access to an online payment provider", and for startups from countries such as Ukraine or Belarus which suffer financial limitations from their governments. In 2019, cryptocurrency payment processor CoinsPaid established operations in Estonia, referencing the e-Residency program, EU membership, and local regulatory conditions.

E-residency is not related to citizenship and does not provide the right to physically enter or reside in Estonia.

It is not a way to avoid paying taxes in the country of actual residence – instead, one becomes a taxpayer both in Estonia and in the country where one is a citizen and tax resident. The e-residency program was developed primarily for location-independent startups and companies offering digital services.

== Background ==
E-residency was led by Taavi Kotka, the vice chancellor of communications and state information systems in the Ministry of Economic Affairs and Communications. Although the idea of issuing ID cards to non-residents had been discussed at least from about 2007, and proposed again in 2012 by Estonian cybersecurity expert Anto Veldre, the concrete proposal ("10 million e-residents by 2025") was presented by Taavi Kotka, Ruth Annus, and Siim Sikkut on an idea contest by Estonian Development Fund in 2014. The project was initiated with the prize money from the contest. It is developed by a state-owned foundation, Enterprise Estonia.

Kotka stated that, while the further goal of the project would be to gain millions of e-residents, its purpose was to increase the number of active enterprises in Estonia. The private sector must be able to develop concrete services on the legal and technical platform provided by e-residency, while the state would continue developing the legal framework according to the needs of the enterprises. It has also been discussed in Estonian media that e-residency could be used to spread knowledge about Estonian culture online to develop cultural export. By 18 January 2015, there had been applications from 225 countries, most of them from Finland (224), Russia (109), Latvia (38), the United States (34) and the United Kingdom (22).

By the end of 2023, Estonia's e-Residency program had welcomed over 100,000 individuals from 181 countries worldwide. In less than a decade since the initiative's inception, these e-residents have established more than 27,000 Estonian enterprises, with the number continuing to grow rapidly. The Estonian virtual residency program shows how established nations may adopt strategies similar to micronations, providing an example of what citizenship might look like in a post-national world.

== Reception ==
In general the e-residency project was positively reviewed in the news media, being recognized for its innovativeness and potential. Estonia's former Minister of Finance Jürgen Ligi noted in 2014 that it was as yet unclear how e-residency would bring capital to Estonia. Some legal experts warn that using e-residency to incorporate a letterbox company in Estonia might under certain circumstances make that company's profits subject to double taxation, as this is a completely new legal status that has not been considered in the framework of existing international agreements to avoid double taxation.

There has been international interest in different countries, with the issue being covered by media in the United States (The Atlantic; The Wall Street Journal; Ars Technica), United Kingdom (The Guardian; Wired UK), Finland (Helsinki Times), Australia (ABC), Italy (Wired-it), and others. In neighbouring Finland, it elicited some fear that e-residency might give Finnish enterprises an urge to move to Estonia.

There was an increase in interest after the Panama Papers leak pointed out the need for greater transparency in offshore business. After Britain voted to leave the European Union, companies were seeking options to continue to be able to trade in euros, and others had other reasons: in the two weeks following the referendum, applications from Britain (with 616 e-residents hitherto) increased tenfold.

== Security concerns ==
One of the biggest challenges for the Estonian government and other institutions is how to secure the certainty of personal identification in the case of people from countries with whom Estonia does not have justice, security, or law enforcement cooperation. It is also impossible to effectively check the backgrounds of such countries' citizens or, if required, prosecute the crimes they have committed. Furthermore, the ability to function as an entrepreneur provided by e-Residency may greatly complicate criminal investigations, because, for example, identifying a person who has committed tax fraud or fraud and conducting processes can be difficult due to his or her permanent presence overseas. As a result, criminal investigations, evidence gathering, court hearings, bankruptcy proceedings, and other processes may be slowed or halted.

In 2017, the Estonian government froze the digital ID cards of the e-residency program, two months after discovering a major security flaw that could enable identity theft. ID cards that were issued between 16 October 2014, and 25 November 2017, were suspended until owners updated to a new security certificate by March 2018.

The Estonian government first revealed the original flaw in September, but gave no details until much later.

== Partner services ==
The e-residency program offers a marketplace of trusted services of potential use to businesses run using the program.

== See also ==
- Digital signature in Estonia
- e-Estonia
- E-governance
- E-government
- estcoin
- e-Residency of Lithuania
