= Annilaid =

Island in Estonia

Coordinates: 58°12′13″N 24°07′41″E

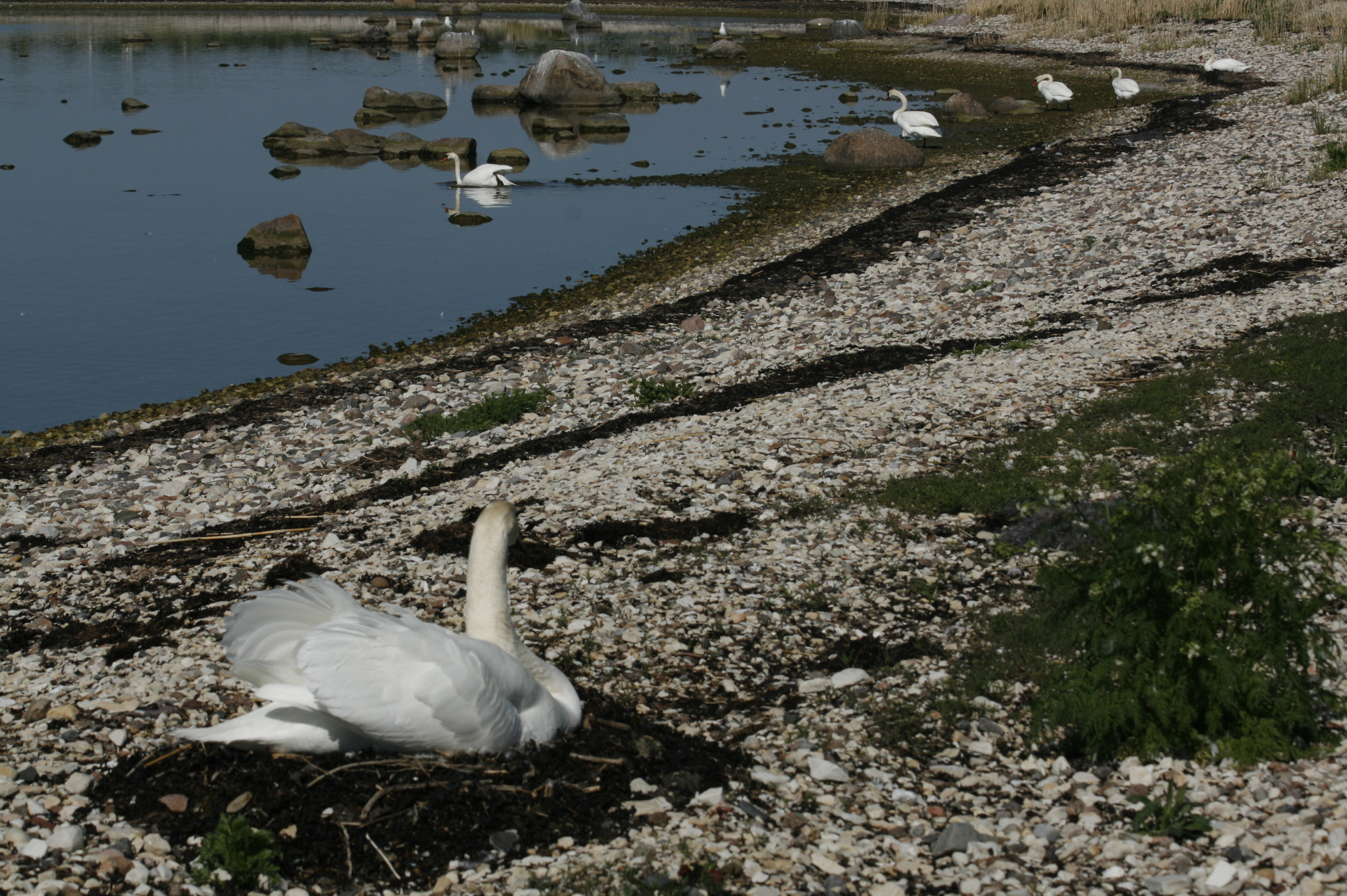
Coast of Annilaid

Annilaid (also Hanilaid, Anõlaid) is an island belonging to the country of Estonia. Administratively, Annilaid is part of the village of Manija, together with the islands of Manilaid and Sorgu.

== See also ==
- List of islands of Estonia
