= Manija =

Manija may refer to:

- Manilaid, an Estonian island in the Gulf of Riga also known as Manija
- Manija, Estonia, a village on the island of Manilaid, Estonia
- Manija Dawlat (born 1982), Tajik pop singer

== See also ==
- Mania (disambiguation)
- Manja (disambiguation)
