= Sorgu Nature Reserve =

Protected area in Estonia

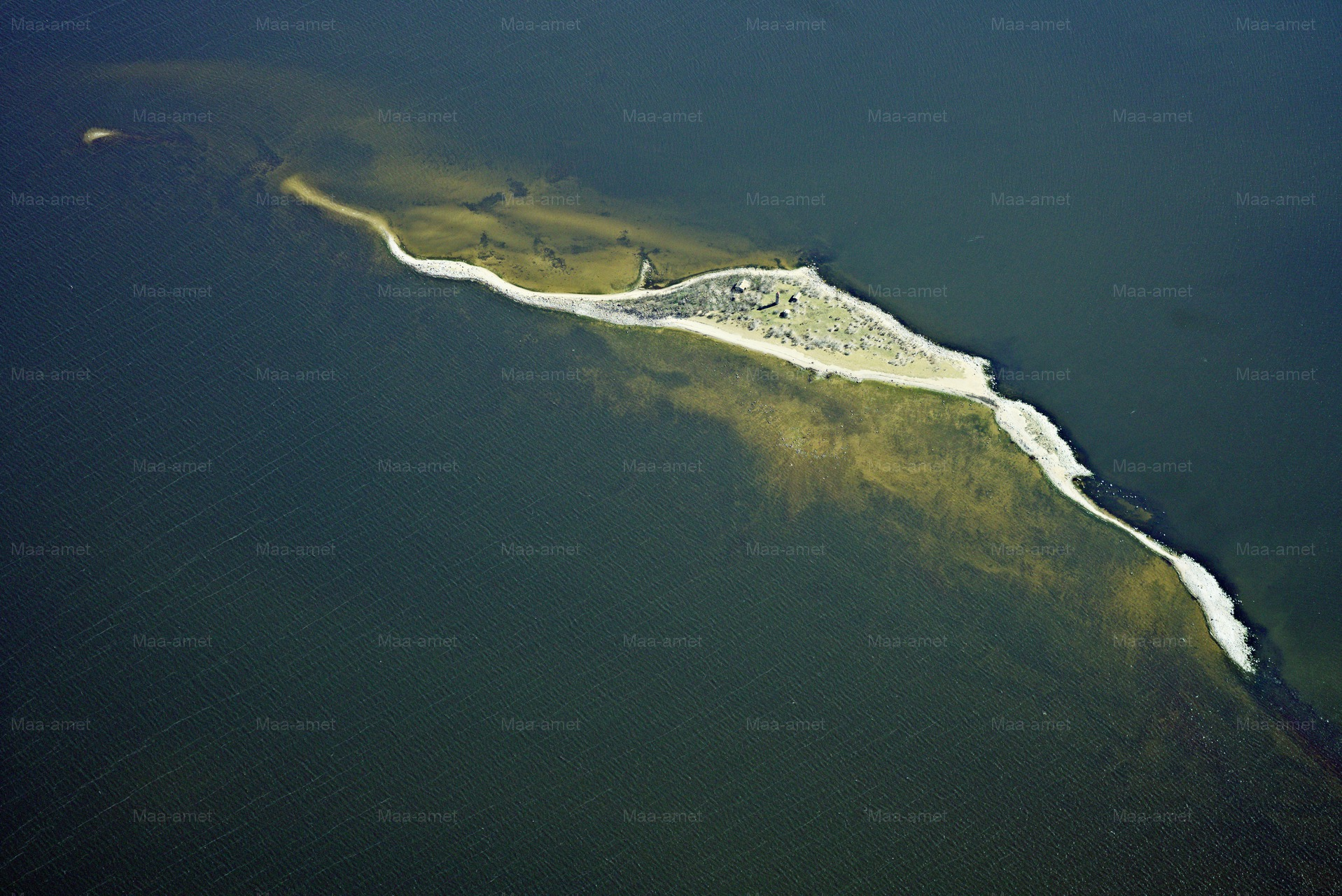

- Location within Estonia
- Location: Estonia
- Coordinates: 58°10′40″N 24°12′00″E
- Area: 274 ha (680 acres)
- Established: 1991 (2014)

Sorgu Nature Reserve is a nature reserve which is located in Pärnu County, Estonia.

The area of the nature reserve is 274 ha.

The protected area was founded in 1991 to protect nature of Sorgu Islet.
