= Manija Landscape Conservation Area =

Protected area in Estonia

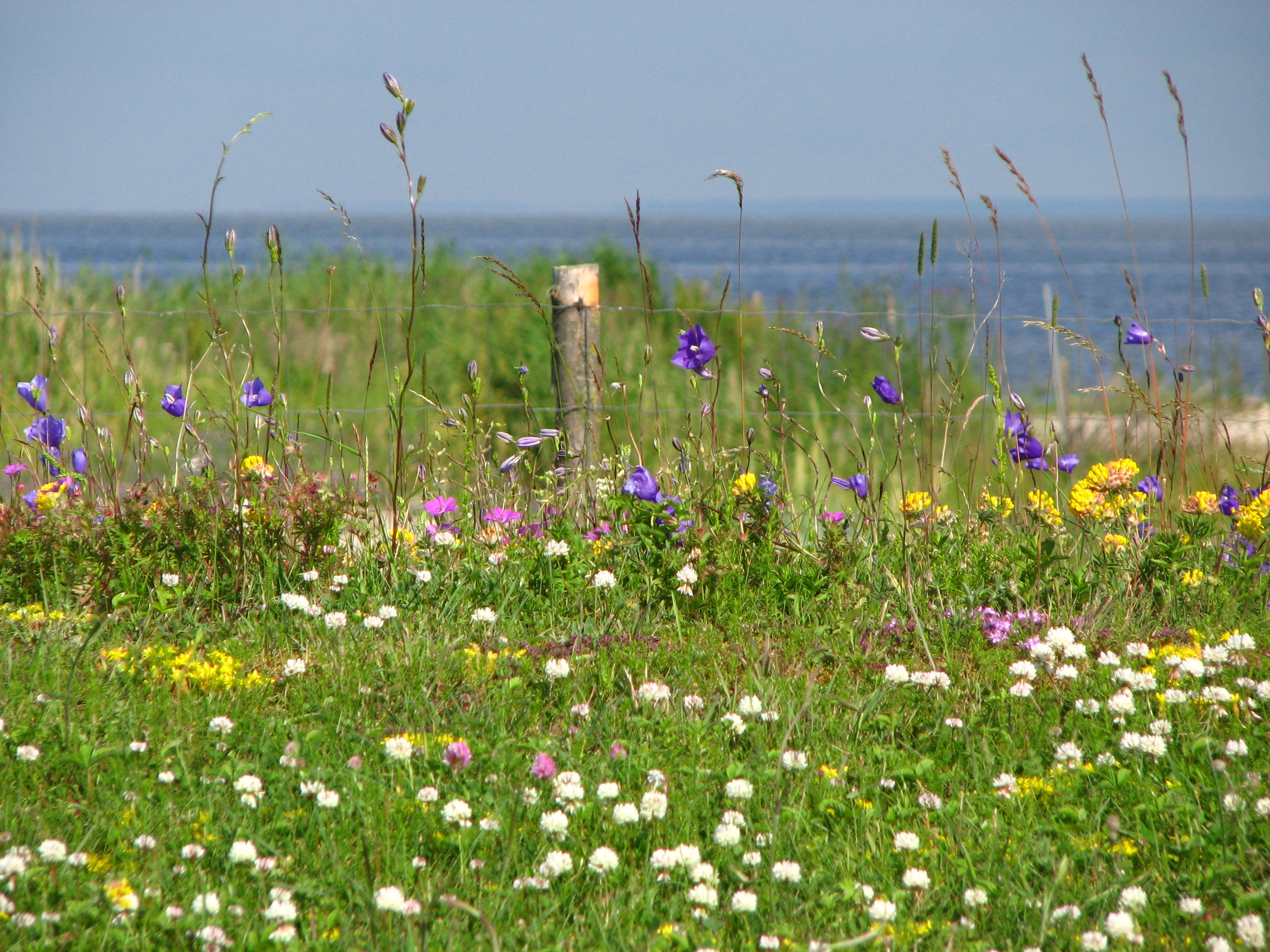

- Location within Estonia
- Location: Estonia
- Coordinates: 58°13′00″N 24°07′30″E
- Area: 205 ha (510 acres)
- Established: 1991 (2006)

Manija Landscape Conservation Area (Estonian: Manija maastikukaitseala) is a nature park is located in Pärnu County, Estonia.

The area of the nature park is 205 ha.

The protected area was founded in 1991 to protect landscapes and biodiversity of Manilaid Island. In 2006, the protected area was designated to the landscape conservation area.
