= Lao, Estonia =

Village in Estonia

Lao
- Village
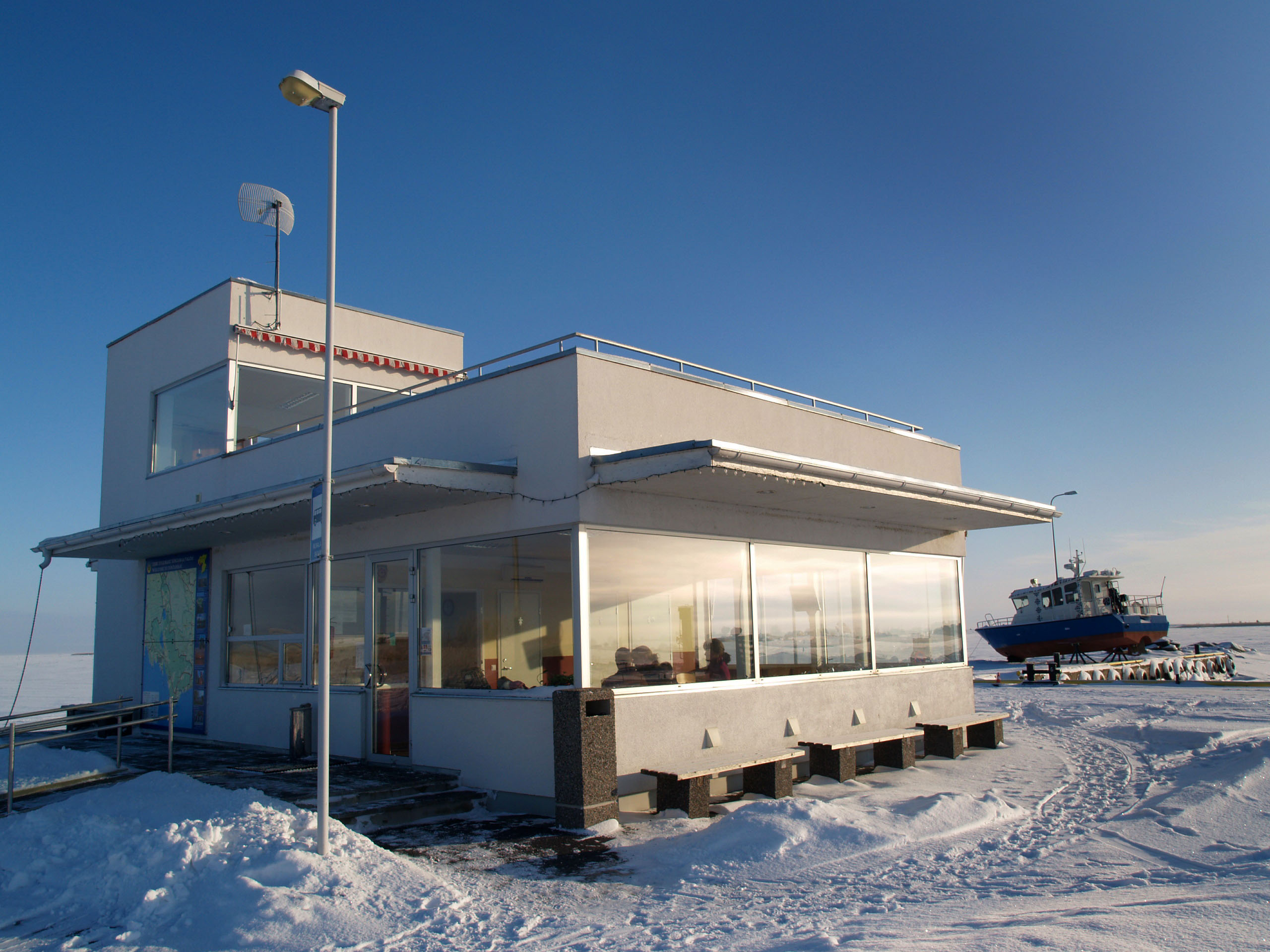
- Munalaiu harbour in winter.

- Location in Estonia
- Coordinates: 58°14′55″N 24°06′17″E
- Country: Estonia
- County: Pärnu County
- Municipality: Pärnu urban municipality

Population (01.01.2011)
  - Total: 31

Lao is a village in Pärnu urban municipality, Pärnu County, in southwestern Estonia. It is located on the top of the Tõstamaa peninsula, on the coast of the Gulf of Riga. Lao has a population of 31 as of 1 January 2011.

Munalaiu harbour, which connects the islands Kihnu and Manilaid with the mainland, is located in Lao.
