= Sorgu =

Island in Estonia

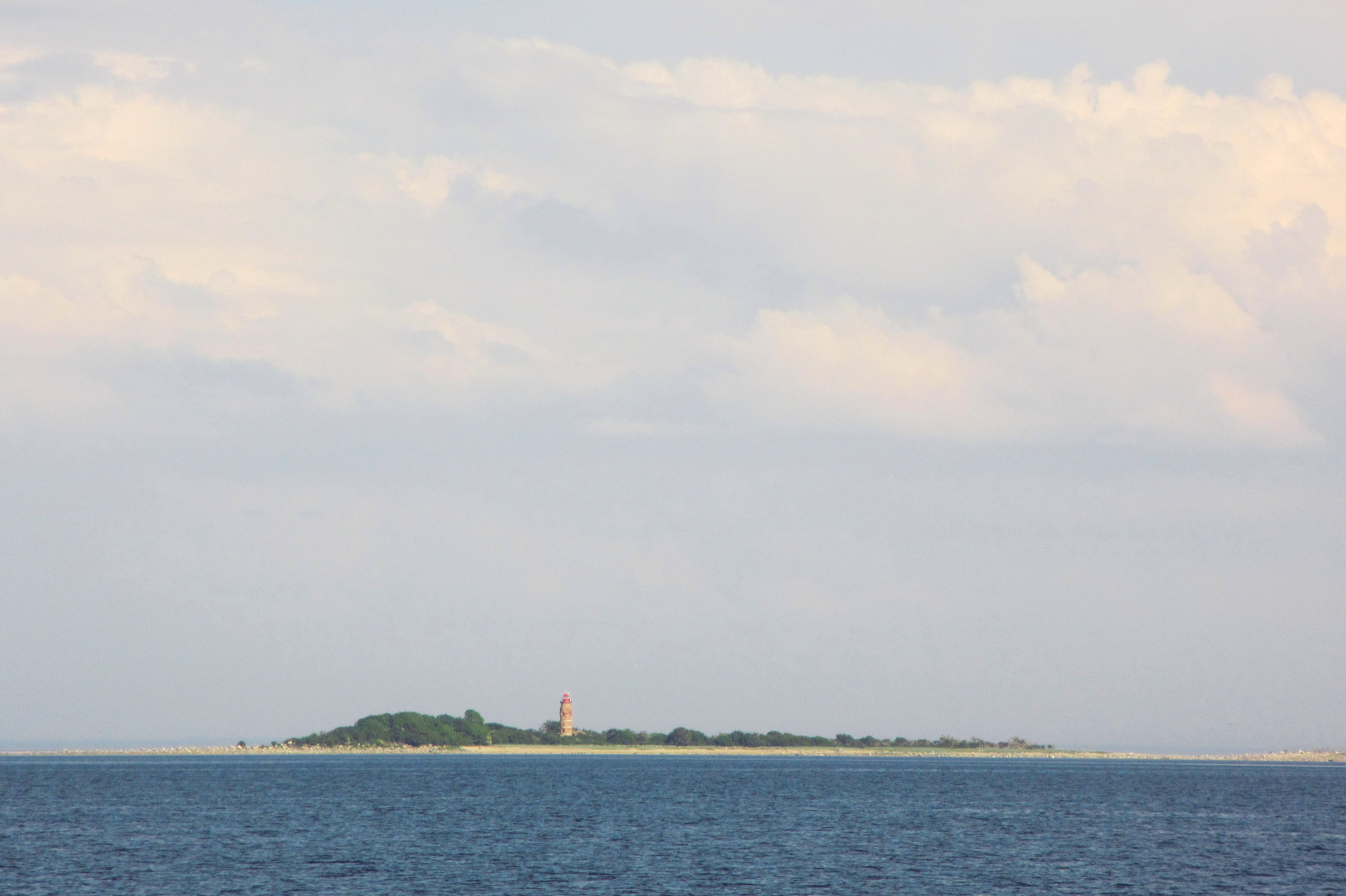
- Interactive map of Sorgu

Geography
- Location: Gulf of Riga
- Coordinates: 58°10′42.23″N 24°11′58.63″E
- Area: 5.07 ha (12.5 acres)
- Coastline: 2.4 km (1.49 mi)
- Highest elevation: 5 m (16 ft)

Administration
- Estonia
- County: Pärnu County
- Municipality: Pärnu
- Settlement: Manija

Demographics
- Population: 0

Sorgu (Swedish: Sorkholm) is a 5-hectare (12-acre) uninhabited Estonian islet in the Gulf of Riga, 5 km (3.1 mi) southeast of the island of Manilaid. Administratively Sorgu belongs to the Manija village in Pärnu municipality, Pärnu County.

The reefs of Sorgu were already mentioned on the Willem Janzoon Blaeu's 1662 Livonian map as Sorkholm. In 1904, a 16-metre (52 ft) brick lighthouse with outbuildings was built. Later in 1913 the complex was expanded to accommodate the lighthouse keeper's family. The lighthouse has been automated since the 1970s.

== See also ==
- List of islands of Estonia
