= Manilaid =

Island in Estonia

- Location in the Baltic Sea region Location in Estonia Location in Europe

Geography
- Location: Gulf of Riga
- Coordinates: 58°12′49″N 24°07′16″E

Administration
- Estonia
- County: Pärnu County

Manilaid is a 1.87 km^{2} (0.72 sq mi) Estonian islet in the Gulf of Riga, located between the island of Kihnu and the mainland's Tõstamaa peninsula. Together with the neighbouring smaller uninhabited islets Sorgu and Annilaid, Manilaid forms the village of Manija. Administratively the village belongs to Pärnu municipality in Pärnu County.

The island was unpoplulated until 1933, when about 80 residents moved to Manilaid from the neighbouring Kihnu. At its peak, there were about 150 residents on the island. During the Soviet era, the population decreased. On January 1, 2011, Manilaid's population was 47.

Manilaid has a ferry connection with the Munalaiu harbour on the mainland. In the winter, when the Gulf of Riga is covered with ice, the island is reachable by ice bridge.

== Gallery ==
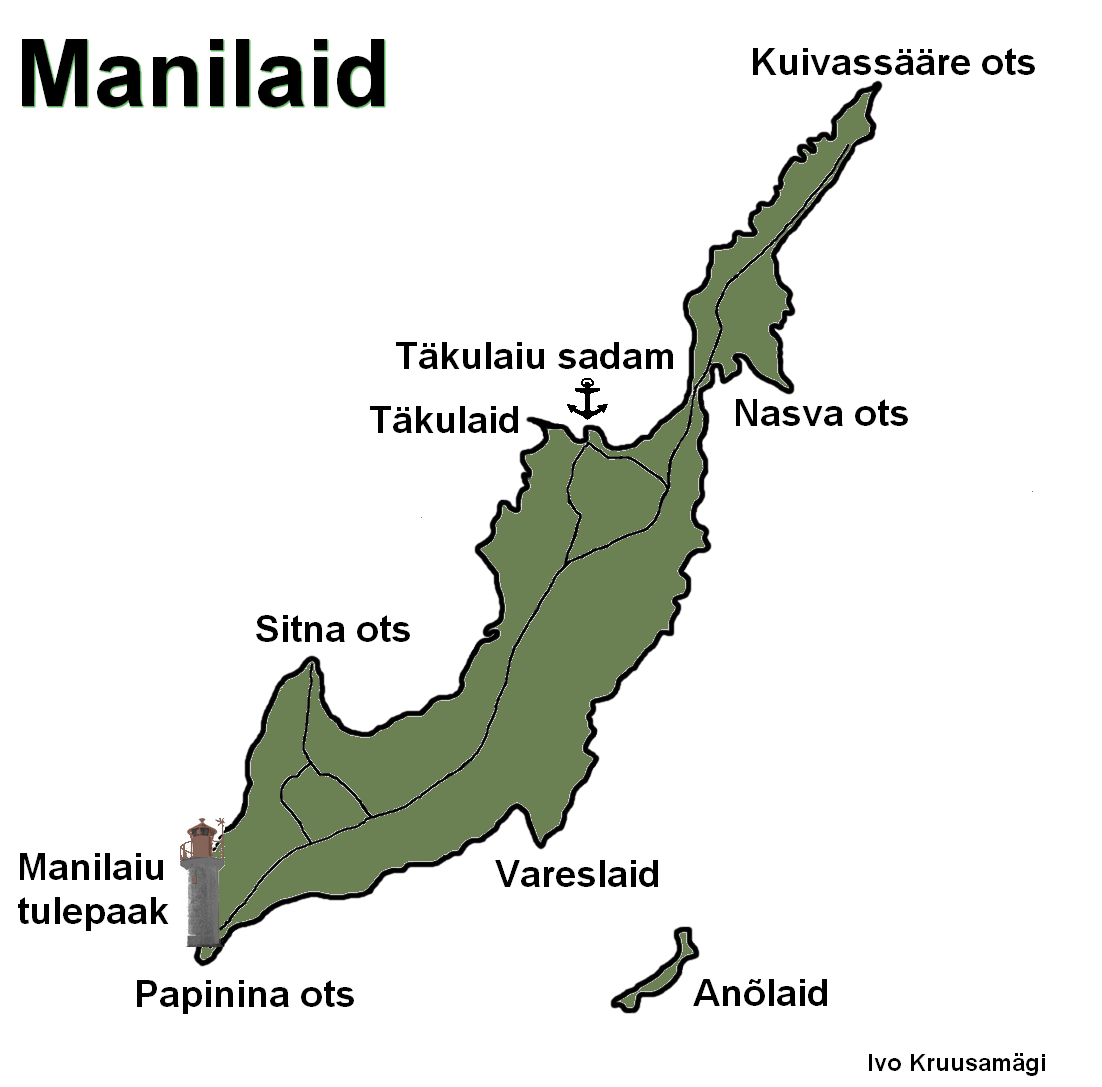
Map of Manilaid

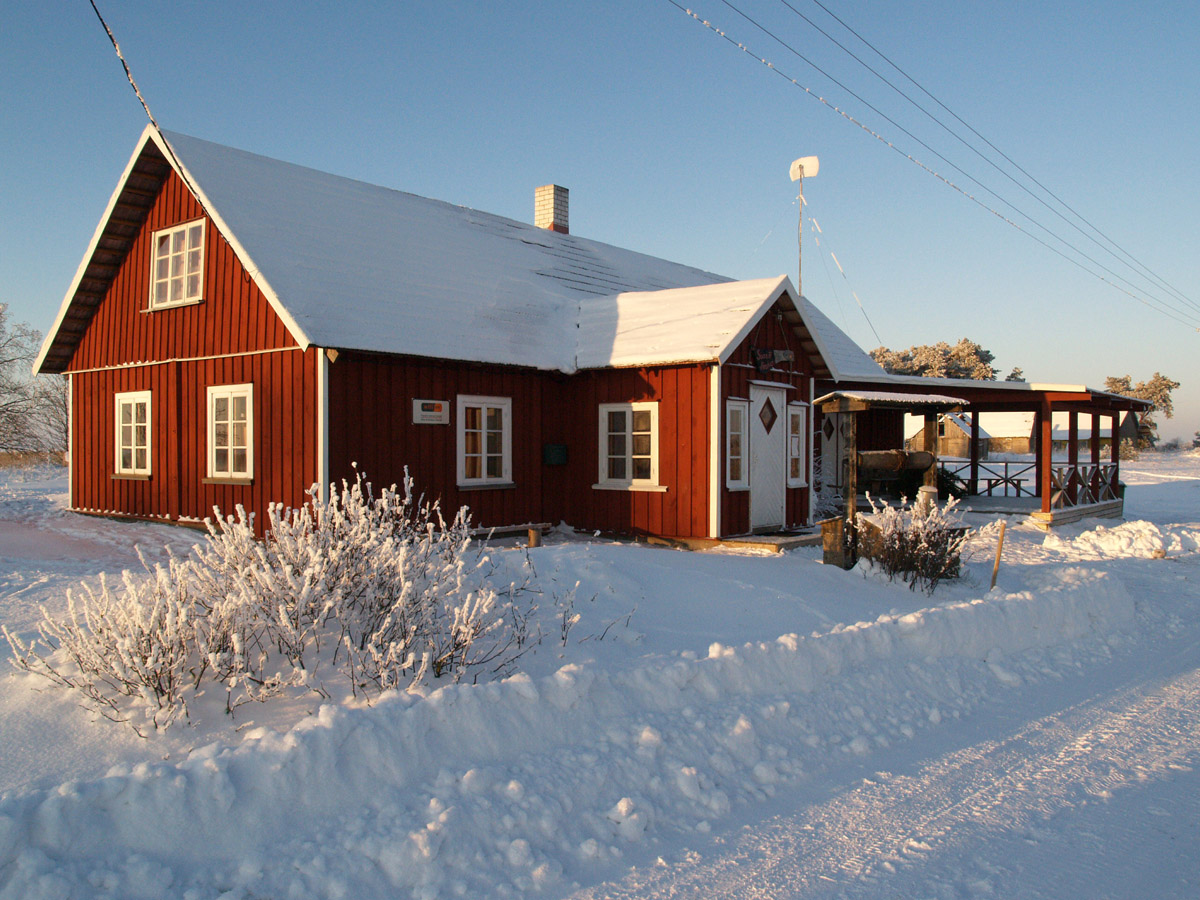
Village centre

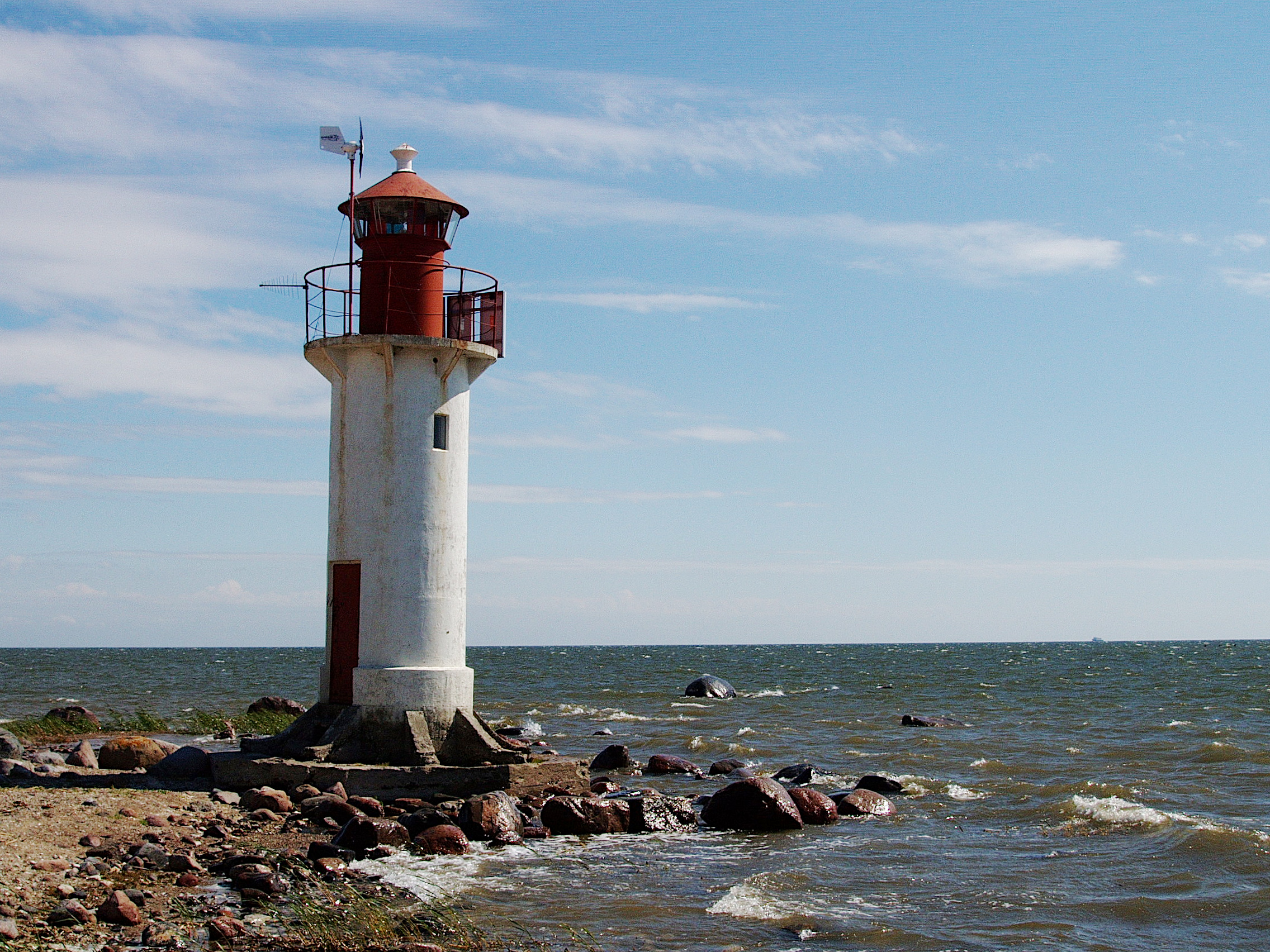
Lighthouse

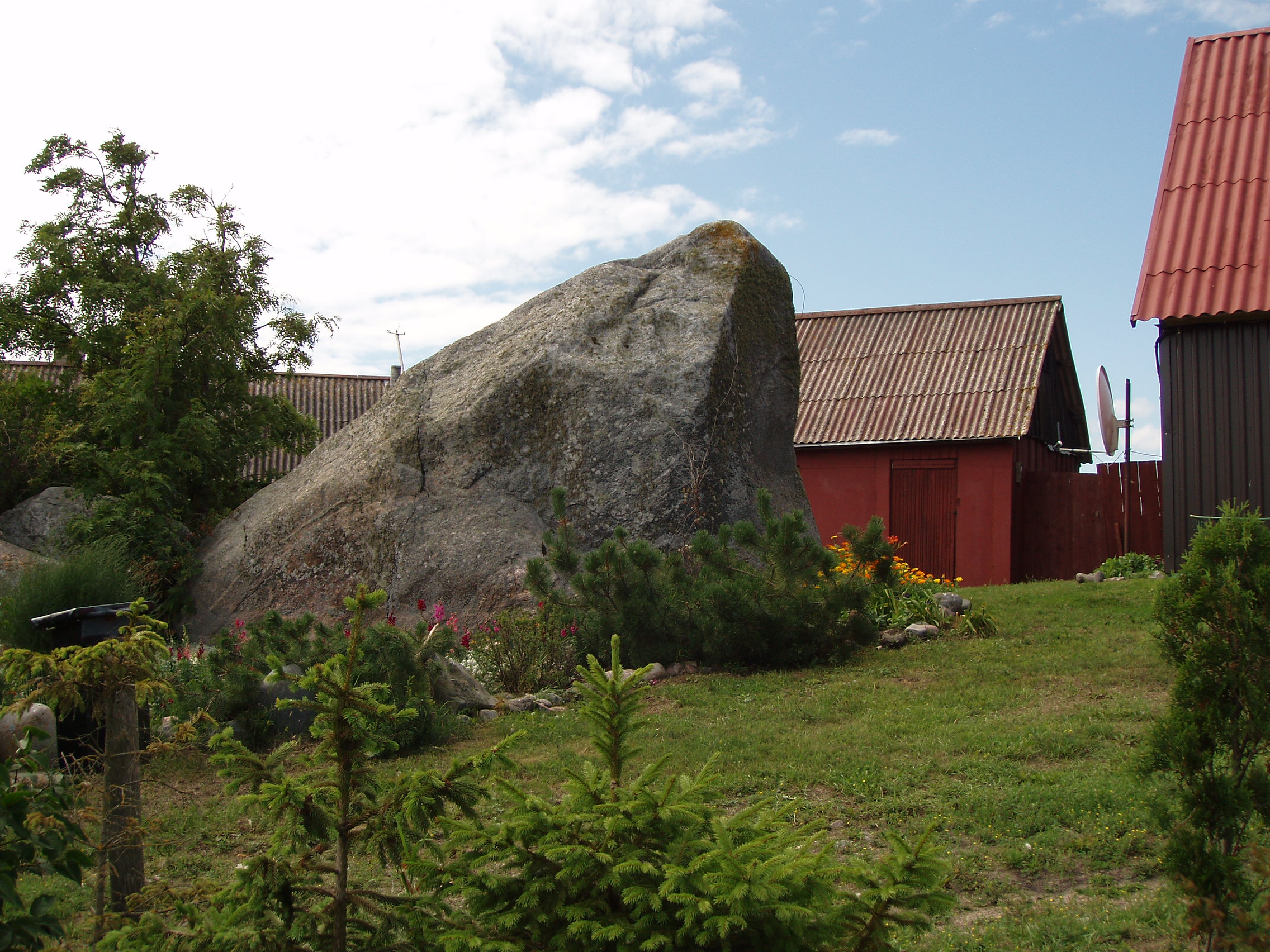
Kokkõkivi, the largest glacial erratic in Pärnu County.

== See also ==
- List of islands of Estonia
