= Manija, Estonia =

Village in Estonia

- Village
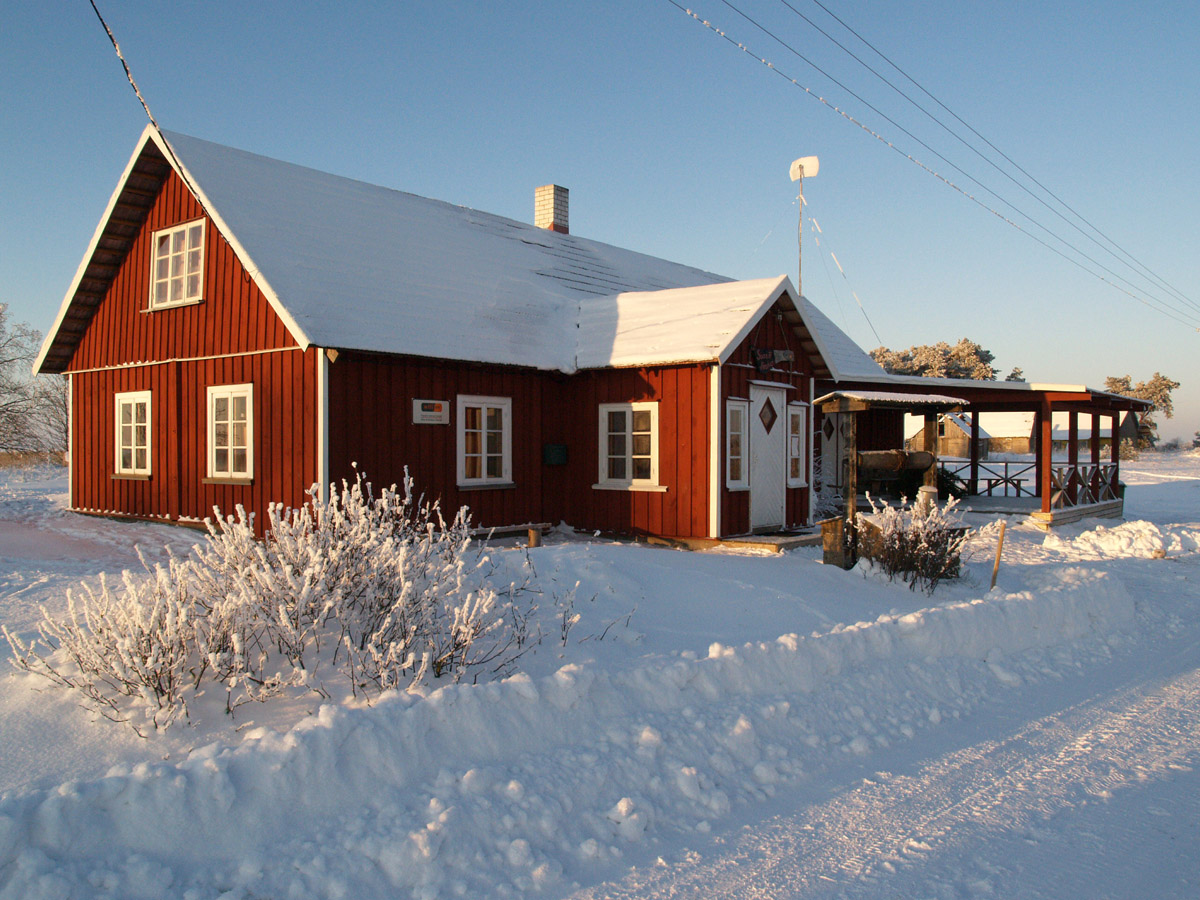
- Village center

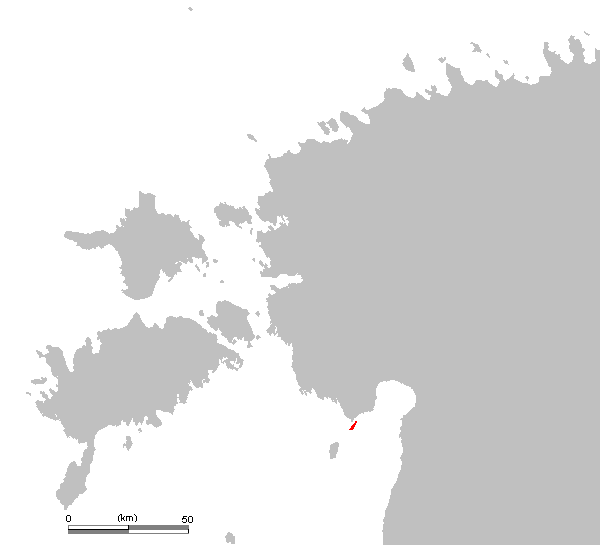
- Manilaid in the Gulf of Riga

- Location within Estonia
- Coordinates: 58°12′49″N 24°07′16″E
- Country: Estonia
- County: Pärnu County
- Parish: Pärnu

Area
  - Total: 1.9 km^{2} (0.73 sq mi)

Population (01.01.2011)
  - Total: 47
  - Density: 25/km^{2} (64/sq mi)
- Time zone: UTC+2 (EET)
  - Summer (DST): UTC+3 (EEST)

Manija is a village in Pärnu, Pärnu County in Estonia. It is located on the island of Manilaid in the Gulf of Riga.
