= 2014 Scandinavian Touring Car Championship =

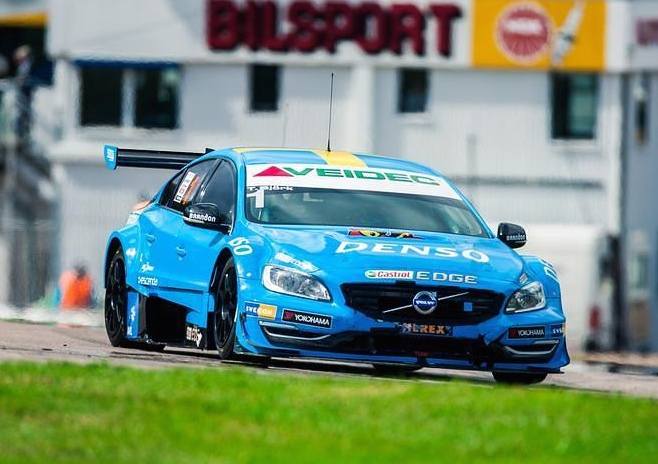
Volvo S60 Solution F of Thed Björk

The 2014 Scandinavian Touring Car Championship season was the fourth Scandinavian Touring Car Championship season. The season started at Ring Knutstorp on 10 May and ended on 20 September at Mantorp Park, after six double-header rounds. It was the second year of TTA – Racing Elite League silhouette regulations in the series following the merge of the STCC and TTA at the end of the 2012 season. Thed Björk entered the season as the series' defending champion.

Björk won his second consecutive title, after winning three races during the season; he also achieved three pole positions which were the equivalent of three further race victories, as points were awarded on the same scale for qualifying as the races. Björk finished 33 points clear of his nearest rival, Fredrik Larsson, who achieved a single race victory at Mantorp Park, as well as a pole position at the first Knutstorp meeting. Third place in the championship went to Fredrik Ekblom, who like his team-mate Björk, achieved three race victories, but with one pole position fewer. Other race victories were taken by Philip Forsman (two wins), Mattias Lindberg, Andreas Wernersson and Erik Jonsson. Volvo Polestar Racing won the teams' championship by almost 100 points ahead of the WestCoast Racing/BMW Dealer Team.

== Teams and drivers ==
All teams were Swedish-registered.

Team	Car	No.	Driver	Rounds
Volvo Polestar Racing	Volvo S60 TTA	1	(Sweden) Thed Björk	All
Volvo Polestar Racing	Volvo S60 TTA	11	(Sweden) Fredrik Ekblom	All
Volvo Polestar Racing	Volvo S60 TTA	13	(Sweden) Carl Philip Bernadotte	All
Team Tidö	Saab 9-3 TTA	3	(Sweden) Richard Göransson	All
Team Tidö	Saab 9-3 TTA	8	(Sweden) Roger Samuelsson	1–3, 5–6
Team Tidö	Saab 9-3 TTA	24	(Sweden) Jan Nilsson	5–6
WestCoast Racing	BMW SR TTA	4	(Sweden) Fredrik Larsson	All
WestCoast Racing	BMW SR TTA	5	(Sweden) Matte Karlsson	5
WestCoast Racing	BMW SR TTA	6	(Sweden) Erik Jonsson	All
WestCoast Racing	BMW SR TTA	7	(Sweden) Philip Forsman	All
Team Kia	Kia Optima TTA	9	(Sweden) Mattias Lindberg	All
Team Kia	Kia Optima TTA	10	(Sweden) Andreas Wernersson	All
Team Kia	Kia Optima TTA	95	(Sweden) Linus Ohlsson	All
Dacia Dealer Team	Dacia SE TTA	20	(Sweden) Mattias Andersson	All
PWR Racing	Saab 9-3 TTA	37	(Sweden) Daniel Haglöf	5–6
PWR Racing	Saab 9-3 TTA	93	(Finland) Emma Kimiläinen	All

== Race calendar and results ==
All rounds were held in Sweden.

Round		Circuit	Location	Date	Pole Position	Fastest lap	Race winner	Winning team	Map
1	R1	Ring Knutstorp	Kageröd, Scania	10 May		(Sweden) Richard Göransson	(Sweden) Mattias Lindberg	Brovallen Design	2014 Scandinavian Touring Car Championship is located in Sweden
1	R2	Ring Knutstorp	Kageröd, Scania	10 May	(Sweden) Fredrik Ekblom	(Sweden) Fredrik Ekblom	(Sweden) Fredrik Ekblom	Volvo Polestar Racing	2014 Scandinavian Touring Car Championship is located in Sweden
2	R3	Göteborg City Race	Gothenburg, Västra Götaland	6 June		(Sweden) Fredrik Ekblom	(Sweden) Erik Jonsson	WestCoast Racing	2014 Scandinavian Touring Car Championship is located in Sweden
2	R4	Göteborg City Race	Gothenburg, Västra Götaland	6 June	(Sweden) Thed Björk	(Sweden) Thed Björk	(Sweden) Thed Björk	Volvo Polestar Racing	2014 Scandinavian Touring Car Championship is located in Sweden
3	R5	Falkenbergs Motorbana	Falkenberg, Halland	12 July		(Sweden) Fredrik Larsson	(Sweden) Philip Forsman	WestCoast Racing	2014 Scandinavian Touring Car Championship is located in Sweden
3	R6	Falkenbergs Motorbana	Falkenberg, Halland	12 July	(Sweden) Fredrik Ekblom	(Sweden) Fredrik Ekblom	(Sweden) Fredrik Ekblom	Volvo Polestar Racing	2014 Scandinavian Touring Car Championship is located in Sweden
4	R7	Ring Knutstorp	Kageröd, Scania	23 August		(Sweden) Mattias Lindberg	(Sweden) Philip Forsman	WestCoast Racing	2014 Scandinavian Touring Car Championship is located in Sweden
4	R8	Ring Knutstorp	Kageröd, Scania	23 August	(Sweden) Fredrik Ekblom	(Sweden) Thed Björk	(Sweden) Thed Björk	Volvo Polestar Racing	2014 Scandinavian Touring Car Championship is located in Sweden
5	R9	Solvalla	Stockholm	6 September		(Sweden) Philip Forsman	(Sweden) Andreas Wernersson	Brovallen Design	2014 Scandinavian Touring Car Championship is located in Sweden
5	R10	Solvalla	Stockholm	6 September	(Sweden) Thed Björk	(Sweden) Thed Björk	(Sweden) Thed Björk	Volvo Polestar Racing	2014 Scandinavian Touring Car Championship is located in Sweden
6	R11	Mantorp Park	Mantorp, Östergötland	20 September		(Sweden) Fredrik Larsson	(Sweden) Fredrik Larsson	WestCoast Racing	2014 Scandinavian Touring Car Championship is located in Sweden
6	R12	Mantorp Park	Mantorp, Östergötland	20 September	(Sweden) Thed Björk	(Sweden) Thed Björk	(Sweden) Fredrik Ekblom	Volvo Polestar Racing	2014 Scandinavian Touring Car Championship is located in Sweden

== Championship standings ==
=== Drivers' championship ===
Pos	Driver	KNU			GÖT			FAL			KNU			SOL			MAN			Pts
Pos	Driver	Q1	1	2	Q2	3	4	Q3	5	6	Q4	7	8	Q5	9	10	Q6	11	12	Pts
1	(Sweden) Thed Björk	4	7	4	1	9	1	4	3	9	1	4	1	1	5	1	1	4	2	279
2	(Sweden) Fredrik Larsson	1	4	2	4	5	5	2	4	2	3	Ret	2	5	4	5	6	1	3	246
3	(Sweden) Fredrik Ekblom	2	6	1	2	7	DNS	1	Ret	1	2	Ret	DNS	3	12	4	2	6	1	228
4	(Sweden) Richard Göransson	3	9	3	3	8	2	3	Ret	5	6	Ret	DNS	2	Ret	3	3	7	4	163
5	(Sweden) Philip Forsman	8	2	7	12	Ret	8	9	1	Ret	8	1	4	4	9	2	4	8	5	158
6	(Sweden) Mattias Andersson	5	5	5	8	3	4	4	5	3	4	Ret	DNS	7	2	7	10	9	8	147
7	(Sweden) Linus Ohlsson	7	Ret	6	6	2	3	6	8	6	5	8	Ret	6	3	13	5	3	6	143
8	(Sweden) Mattias Lindberg	9	1	8	7	4	6	8	11	4	11	5	3	13	6	9	8	11	11	123
9	(Sweden) Andreas Wernersson	13	10	Ret	5	Ret	11	7	6	Ret	9	3	5	8	1	6	9	2	10	110
10	(Sweden) Erik Jonsson	10	3	R	10	1	7	12	7	7	10	2	Ret	14	Ret	DNS	14	12	12	79
11	(Finland) Emma Kimiläinen	6	Ret	9	9	Ret	DNS	10	2	11	7	6	7	10	Ret	11	11	10	9	55
12	(Sweden) Carl Philip Bernadotte	11	Ret	Ret	11	Ret	9	11	10	10	12	7	6	9	10	10	12	Ret	13	22
13	(Sweden) Daniel Haglöf													11	Ret	Ret	7	5	7	20
14	(Sweden) Roger Samuelsson	12	8	10	13	6	10	13	9	8				15	11	12	15	14	14	20
15	(Sweden) Matte Karlsson													12	7	8				10
16	(Sweden) Jan Nilsson													16	8	Ret	13	13	Ret	4

=== Teams' championship ===
Pos	Team	KNU	GOT	FAL	KNU	SOL	MAN	Pts
1	Volvo Polestar Racing	85	84	81	83	93	111	537
2	WCR BMW Dealer Team	90	49	77	76	71	76	439
3	Team Kia	37	50	38	61	54	41	281
4	Team Tidö	44	60	40	10	41	30	225
5	Dacia Dealer Team	32	46	37	12	32	12	171
6	PWR Racing Team	12	4	24	26	8	33	107
