= Fredrik Larsson (racing driver) =

Swedish racing driver

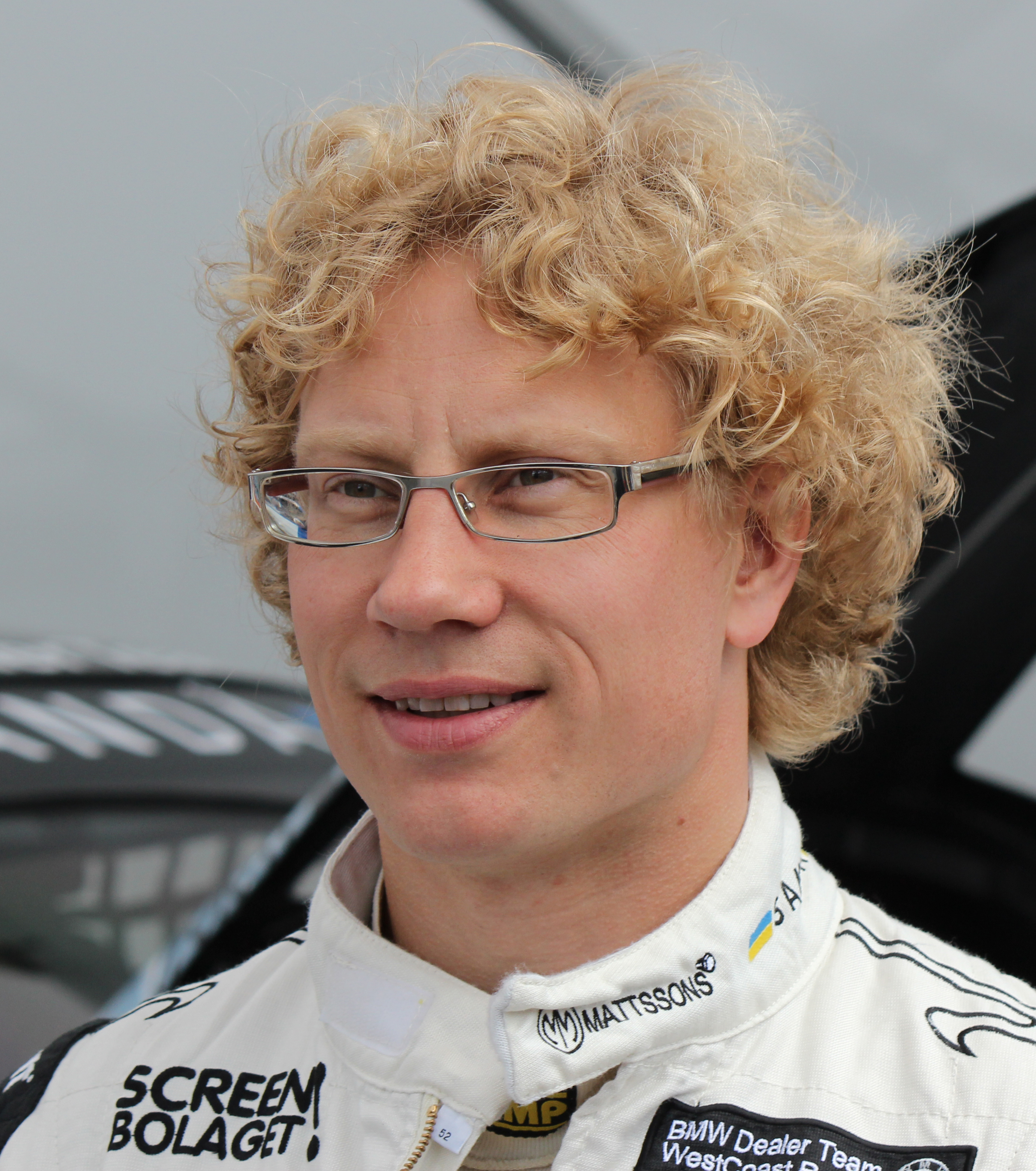
- Fredrik Larsson in 2012
- Nationality: Swedish
- Born: 3 September 1976 (age 50)

Previous series
- 2013–2014 2012 2011 2009–2010 1999 1998 1997 1995–1996 1995: Scandinavian Touring Car Championship; TTA – Racing Elite League; ADAC GT Masters; Porsche Carrera Cup Scandinavia; Renault Sport Clio Trophy; Camaro Cup; Indy Lights; Barber Dodge Pro Series; Formula Ford Sweden Junior

Championship titles
- 1996 1995 2016: Barber Dodge Pro Series; Formula Ford Sweden Junior; Porsche Carrera Cup Scandinavia

Fredrik Larsson (born 3 September 1976 in Falkenberg) is a Swedish racing driver. Larsson won the 1996 Barber Dodge Pro Series and currently competes in the Scandinavian Touring Car Championship for WestCoast Racing.

== Racing career ==
=== Formula racing ===
After a long karting career spanning between 1986 and 1993 Larsson debuted in single seaters in 1994. Larsson dominated the Swedish Formula Ford Junior category winning eight out of ten races. At eighteen years old Larsson debuted in the Barber Dodge Pro Series in the United States of America. In his first season the young Swede won the race at Texas World Speedway and scored another three podium finishes. These good results placed him fifth in the championship standings. Larsson returned to the series in 1996. After winning five races in the twelve round season Larsson only had to finish twelfth in the last round to secure the championship. At Lime Rock Park the Swede finished second and secured the championship while Derek Hill won the race.

After his championship win Larsson graduated into the Indy Lights. Larsson drove his Lola T97/20 entered by Johansson Motorsports in nine out of thirteen rounds. The Swede had a very good start of the season. At Homestead-Miami Speedway the 20-year-old driver finished second behind David Empringham. Larsson scored another podium finish at Nazareth Speedway where he finished third. After a number of retirements Johansson Motorsports replaced Larsson with Jeff Ward. Larsson tested for Alan Docking Racing at Pembrey Circuit looking to compete in the British Formula Three Championship. However this deal never came to fruition.

=== Return to racing ===
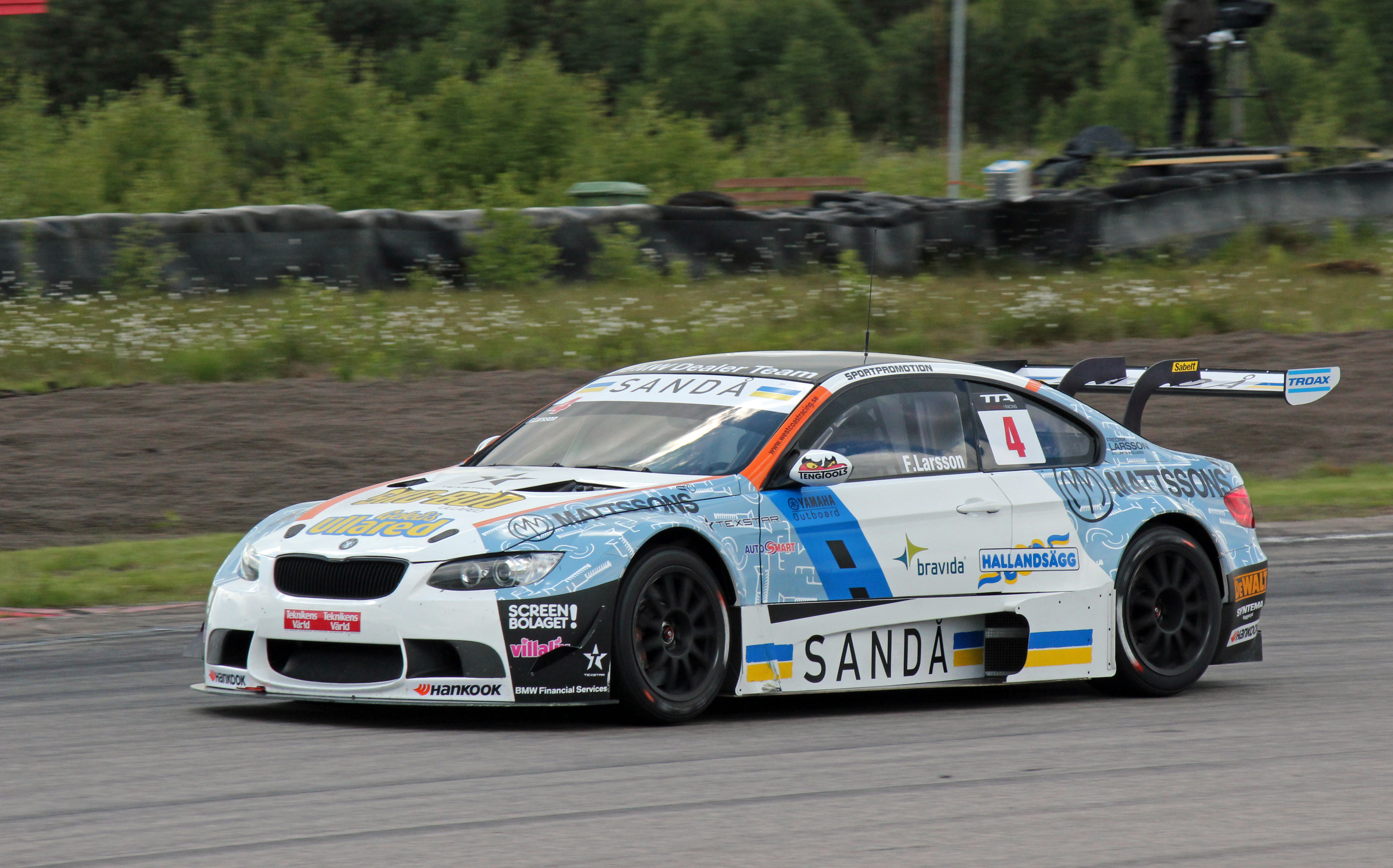
Larsson in the TTA at Anderstorp 2012

After not racing between 1999 and 2009, Larsson returned to competitive auto racing in 2009 in the Porsche Carrera Cup Scandinavia. Larsson finished third in the championship behind Joakim Mangs and Tony Rickardsson. The fast Swede won six out of sixteen races. The following year, he won nine races and finished second in the championship. For 2011, Larsson competed in a variety of racing classes. He competed a BMW Z4 GT3 entered by WestCoast Racing in the Swedish GT, ADAC GT Masters and the 24 Hours of Nürburgring. Larsson won three out of three races in the Swedish GT.

For 2012. Larsson joined the newly formed TTA – Racing Elite League after the series split from the Swedish Touring Car Championship. At Anderstorp Raceway, Larsson started from pole position, won the race and also set the fasted race lap. He was the best BMW M3 driver finishing fourth in the standings behind two Volvo S60's and one Saab 9-3. After the formation of the Scandinavian Touring Car Championship, Larsson remained at WestCoast Racing. For 2013, Larsson did not win a race but he scored two-second-place finishes and two third-place finishes. Larsson finished sixth in the standings.

== Racing record ==
=== American open–wheel racing results ===
(key)

==== Indy Lights ====
Year	Team	Chassis	Engine	1	2	3	4	5	6	7	8	9	10	11	12	13	Rank	Points	Ref
1997	Johansson Motorsports	Lola T97/20	Buick V6	MIA; 2	LBH; Ret	NAZ; 3	SAV; 10	STL; Ret	MIL; 5	DET; Ret	POR; 22	TOR; Ret	TRO	VAN	LS	FON	**12th**	**43**	

=== Complete TTA/STCC – Racing Elite League results ===
(key) (Races in bold indicate pole position) (Races in italics indicate fastest lap)

Year	Team	Car	1	2	3	4	5	6	7	8	9	10	11	12	DC	Pts
2012	WestCoast Racing	BMW M3 TTA	KAR; 5	AND; 3	GÖT; Ret	FAL; 3	KAR; Ret	**AND**; 1	TIE; 3	GÖT; 12					**4th**	**85**
2013	WestCoast Racing	BMW M3 TTA	**KNU**; 3	KNU; 3	SOL; DSQ	GÖT; 6	**FAL**; Ret	FAL; 2	ÖST; Ret	KAR; 6	KAR; 4	TIE; 2	MAN; 11	MAN; 14	6th	105
