= Volvo Polestar Racing =

Volvo Polestar Racing may refer to:

- Polestar Racing - a Swedish touring car team operating in the Scandinavian Touring Car Championship. It is also a car maker for Volvo making cars like the Volvo polestar based on the C60 it has straight 6 engine which develops 450 hp
- Garry Rogers Motorsport - an Australian touring car team competing in the V8 Supercar championship series.
