= 2020 STCC TCR Scandinavia Touring Car Championship =

Car racing championship

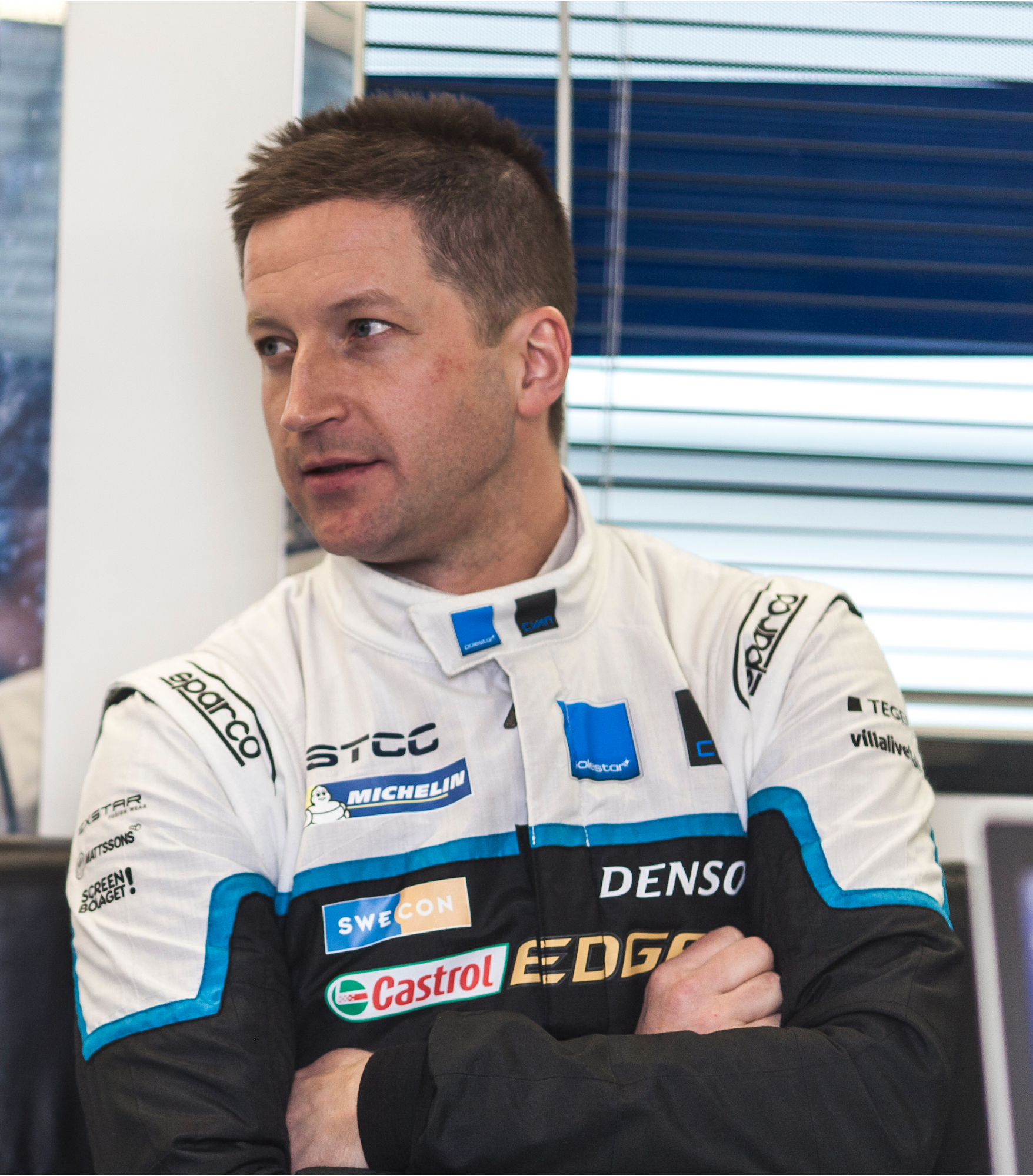
Robert Dahlgren is the reigning Drivers' Champion.

The 2020 STCC TCR Scandinavia Touring Car Championship was the tenth overall season of the Scandinavian Touring Car Championship and the fourth under the internationally recognised TCR formula. It was also the third time the championship has run under the STCC TCR Scandinavia Touring Car Championship banner. Originally due to start on 15 May at Ring Knutstorp and end on 4 October at Mantorp Park, the season start was postponed due to the COVID-19 pandemic. A revised calendar was due to be published sometime after Easter.

Robert Dahlgren and Brink Motorsport are the reigning Drivers' and Teams' champions respectively.

== Entrants ==
The following teams and drivers are set to compete in the 2020 season:

Entrant	Car	Race drivers			
Entrant	Car	No.	Driver name	Rounds	Ref.
(Sweden) PWR Racing (Sweden) Racing for Charity	CUPRA Leon Competición TCR	1	(Sweden) Robert Dahlgren	All	
(Sweden) PWR Racing (Sweden) Racing for Charity	CUPRA Leon Competición TCR	19	(Sweden) Mikaela Åhlin-Kottulinsky	All	
(Sweden) PWR Racing (Sweden) Racing for Charity	CUPRA Leon Competición TCR	37	(Sweden) Daniel Haglöf	4	
(Sweden) PWR Racing (Sweden) Racing for Charity	CUPRA Leon Competición TCR	59	(Sweden) Peter "Poker" Wallenberg	1−3	
(Sweden) Lestrup Racing	Volkswagen Golf GTI TCR	7	(Sweden) Oliver Söderström	All	
(Sweden) Lestrup Racing	Volkswagen Golf GTI TCR	12	(United Kingdom) Robert Huff	All	
(Sweden) Brovallen Design	Audi RS3 LMS TCR	9	(Sweden) Kevin Engman	4	
(Sweden) Brovallen Design	Audi RS3 LMS TCR	91	(Norway) Magnus Gustavsen	1−3	
Honda Racing Sweden	Honda Civic Type-R TCR (FK2)	20	(Sweden) Mattias Andersson	All	
(Sweden) Kågered Racing	Volkswagen Golf GTI TCR	21	(Sweden) Andreas Ahlberg	All	
(Sweden) Kågered Racing	Volkswagen Golf GTI TCR	45	(Sweden) Emil Persson	All	
(Sweden) Kågered Racing	Volkswagen Golf GTI TCR	48	(Sweden) Mikael Karlsson	All	
(Sweden) Experion Racing Team	Hyundai i30 N TCR	22	(Sweden) Albin Wärnelöv	All	
(Sweden) Brink Motorsport	Audi RS3 LMS TCR	51	(Sweden) Hannes Morin	All	
(Sweden) Brink Motorsport	Audi RS3 LMS TCR	71	(Sweden) Tobias Brink	All	
(Sweden) Isac's Racing	Volkswagen Golf GTI TCR	70	(Sweden) Isac Aronsson	1, 3−4	

=== Driver changes ===
- 2019 V8 Thunder Cars champion Emil Persson is set to join Kågered Racing, alongside championship runner-up Mikael Persson.
- Fredrik Blomstedt, who debuted in the series in 2017, was set to join Brink Motorsport but was forced to leave due to financial difficulties.
- William Nyberg is set to debut with his father's team, TPR Motorsport, at the season opener.
- Robert Huff is set to debut with Lestrup Racing.
- Casper Elgaard is set to debut with TPR Motorsport.
- Isac Aronsson is set to debut with his family team, Isac's Racing.

=== Team changes ===
- Kågered Racing is set to expand their operation to three cars.
- PWR Racing is set to replace the Cupra León TCR with the Cupra Leon Competición TCR.
- Experion Racing Team is set to replace their Volkswagen Golf GTI TCR with a Hyundai i30 N TCR.

=== Calendar changes ===
- Two rounds are scheduled to be held in Denmark alongside the inaugural season of the TCR Denmark Touring Car Series.
- Anderstorp Raceway was removed from the calendar.
- Bellahøj Park was added to the calendar.
- The opening round at Ring Knutstorp was postponed due to the COVID-19 pandemic.
- A new, four-round, calendar was released on 15 June 2020.

== Changes ==
=== General changes ===
- In October 2019, SNB-Events AB took over as promoter for the series.
- In December 2019, Spring Media took over the distribution rights of the series.
- The independents' cup is set to return. Any driver over the age of 26, that haven't taken part in STCC TCR Scandinavia before, and are driving cars older than three years will be eligible to compete in the cup.

== Race calendar and results ==
The following 4 rounds are scheduled to take place in 2020:

Round		Circuit	Location	Date	Pole position	Fastest lap	Race winner	Winning team
1	R1	(Sweden) Karlskoga Motorstadion	Karlskoga, Örebro	15–16 August	(Sweden) Oliver Söderström	(United Kingdom) Robert Huff	(Sweden) Oliver Söderström	(Sweden) Lestrup Racing
1	R2	(Sweden) Karlskoga Motorstadion	Karlskoga, Örebro	15–16 August	(Sweden) Tobias Brink	(Sweden) Tobias Brink	(Sweden) Robert Dahlgren	(Sweden) PWR Racing
1	R3	(Sweden) Karlskoga Motorstadion	Karlskoga, Örebro	15–16 August		(Sweden) Andreas Ahlberg	(Sweden) Andreas Ahlberg	(Sweden) Kågered Racing
2	R1	(Sweden) Drivecenter Arena	Skellefteå, Västerbotten	28–29 August	(Sweden) Robert Dahlgren	(Sweden) Robert Dahlgren	(Sweden) Robert Dahlgren	(Sweden) PWR Racing
2	R2	(Sweden) Drivecenter Arena	Skellefteå, Västerbotten	28–29 August	(Sweden) Robert Dahlgren	(Sweden) Tobias Brink	(Sweden) Robert Dahlgren	(Sweden) PWR Racing
2	R3	(Sweden) Drivecenter Arena	Skellefteå, Västerbotten	28–29 August		(Sweden) Tobias Brink	(Sweden) Mikael Karlsson	(Sweden) Kågered Racing
3	R1	(Sweden) Mantorp Park	Mantorp, Östergötland	2–3 October	(Sweden) Tobias Brink	(Sweden) Emil Persson	(Sweden) Tobias Brink	(Sweden) Brink Motorsport
3	R2	(Sweden) Mantorp Park	Mantorp, Östergötland	2–3 October	(Sweden) Tobias Brink	(Sweden) Tobias Brink	(Sweden) Tobias Brink	(Sweden) Brink Motorsport
3	R3	(Sweden) Mantorp Park	Mantorp, Östergötland	2–3 October		(Sweden) Robert Dahlgren	(Sweden) Hannes Morin	(Sweden) Brink Motorsport
4	R1	(Sweden) Ring Knutstorp	Kågeröd, Skåne	9-10 October	(Sweden) Robert Dahlgren	(United Kingdom) Robert Huff	(United Kingdom) Robert Huff	(Sweden) Lestrup Racing
4	R2	(Sweden) Ring Knutstorp	Kågeröd, Skåne	9-10 October	(Sweden) Robert Dahlgren	(Sweden) Robert Dahlgren	(Sweden) Robert Dahlgren	(Sweden) PWR Racing
4	R3	(Sweden) Ring Knutstorp	Kågeröd, Skåne	9-10 October		(Sweden) Robert Dahlgren	(United Kingdom) Robert Huff	(Sweden) Lestrup Racing

== Championship standings ==
=== Drivers' Championship ===
Pos	Driver	GEL (Sweden)			DRI (Sweden)			MAN (Sweden)			KNU (Sweden)			Pts
Pos	Driver	RD1	RD2	RD1	RD1	RD2	RD3	RD1	RD2	RD3	RD1	RD2	RD3	Pts
1	(United Kingdom) Robert Huff	4^{3}	2	3	2^{3}	3	8	2^{3}	2	4	1^{4}	2	1	209
2	(Sweden) Robert Dahlgren	5^{2}	1	7	**1**^{1}	**1**	Ret	5	6	2	**2**^{1}	**1**	2	202
3	(Sweden) Tobias Brink	2^{1}	**9**	6	3^{2}	2	2	**1**^{1}	**1**	5	7^{2}	3	4	190
4	(Sweden) Hannes Morin	6	7	8	6	4	3	6	8	**1**	6^{5}	8	7	109
5	(Sweden) Oliver Söderström	**1**	3	4	5	5	4	DNS^{2}	Ret	9	3^{3}	Ret	Ret	108
6	(Sweden) Mattias Andersson	8	5	2	7	DNS	5	8^{5}	5	6	10	5	3	97
7	(Sweden) Emil Persson	3^{5}	6	5	9	9	7	4^{4}	3	8	6	10	6	94
8	(Sweden) Andreas Ahlberg	7	8	**1**	4^{4}	6	Ret	12	Ret	7	4	12	5	85
9	(Sweden) Mikaela Åhlin-Kottulinsky	Ret^{4}	4	10	8^{5}	10	Ret	3	7	3	5	4	Ret	79
10	(Sweden) Mikael Karlsson	10	9	9	DNS	7	1	7	4	Ret	11	Ret	Ret	53
11	(Norway) Magnus Gustavsen	DNS	12	12	10	8	**6**	9	11	13				15
12	(Sweden) Albin Wärnelöv	9	11	11	Ret	DNS	DNS	11	10	10	13	9	8	10
13	(Sweden) Kevin Engman										9	7	10	9
14	(Sweden) Isac Aronsson	Ret	13	13				10	9	11	14	11	9	5
15	(Sweden) Daniel Haglöf										12	8	Ret	4
16	(Sweden) Peter "Poker" Wallenberg	11	DNS	DNS	11	11	DSQ	13	12	12				0

Championship points were awarded on the results of each race at each event as follows:

Position	**1st**	**2nd**	**3rd**	**4th**	**5th**	**6th**	**7th**	**8th**	**9th**	**10th**
Race	25	18	15	12	10	8	6	4	2	1
Qualifying (Race 1)	5	4	3	2	1					

Colour	Result
Gold	Winner
Silver	Second place
Bronze	Third place
Green	Points classification
Blue	Non-points classification
Blue	Non-classified finish (NC)
Purple	Retired, not classified (Ret)
Red	Did not qualify (DNQ)
Red	Did not pre-qualify (DNPQ)
Black	Disqualified (DSQ)
White	Did not start (DNS)
White	Withdrew (WD)
White	Race cancelled (C)
Blank	Did not practice (DNP)
Blank	Did not arrive (DNA)
Blank	Excluded (EX)

**Bold** – Pole
Italics – Fastest Lap
