= 2013 STCC – Racing Elite League =

Motor racing season

The 2013 Scandinavian Touring Car Championship was the third Scandinavian Touring Car Championship season. The season started at Ring Knutstorp on 4 May and ends on 21 September at Mantorp Park. It is the first year of TTA – Racing Elite League silhouette regulations in the series following the merge of the STCC and TTA at the end of the 2012 seasons. Fredrik Ekblom goes into the championship as reigning champion.

== Teams and drivers ==
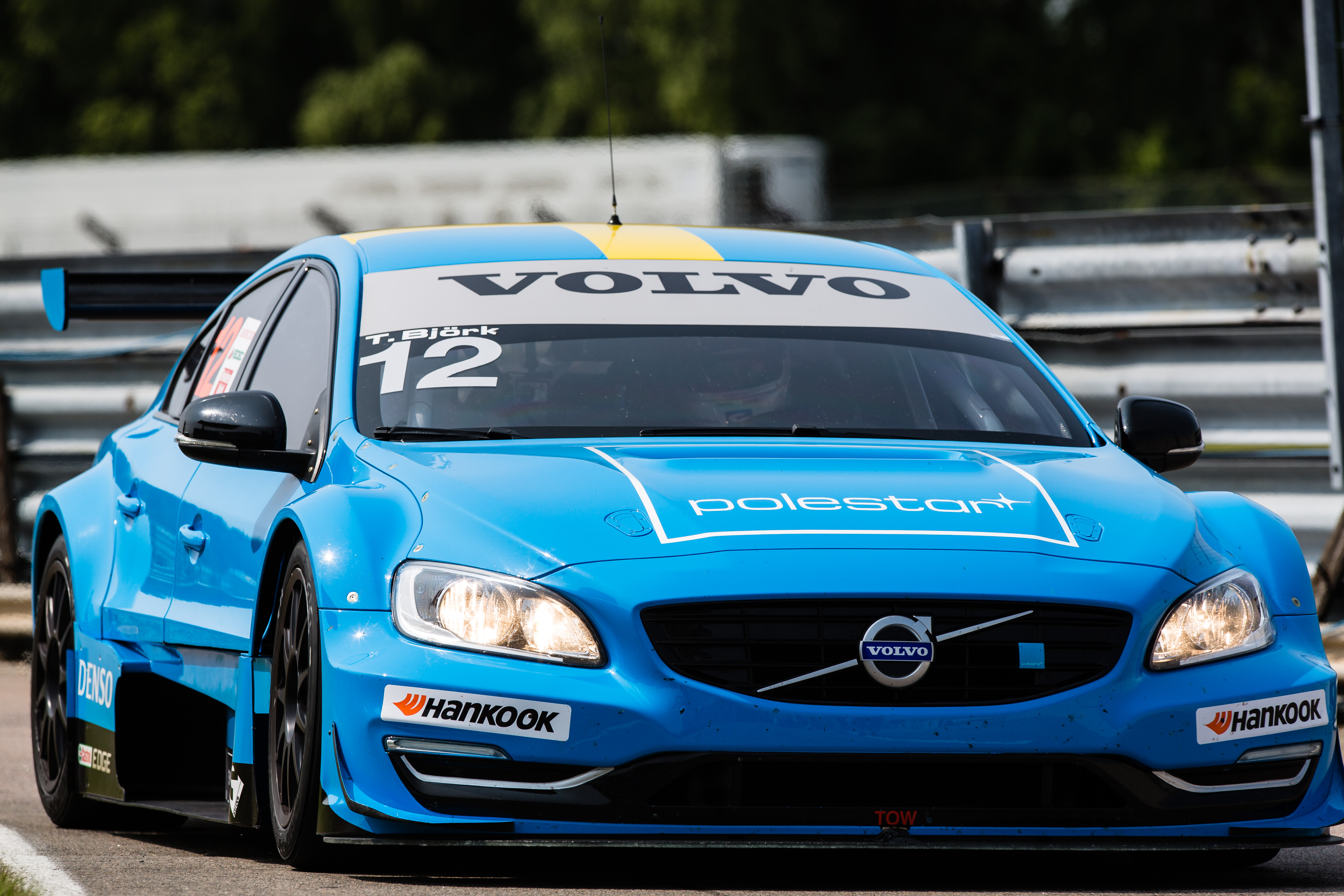
Volvo S60 Solution F of Thed Björk

As the cars used during the 2012 STCC season were banned, major teams such as NIKA Racing (Chevrolet), Kristoffersson Motorsport and IPS (Volkswagen) did not join the merged championship. All teams were Swedish-registered.

Team	Car	No.	Driver	Rounds
Brovallen Design	Citroën C5 TTA	2	(Sweden) Andreas Wernerson	8
Brovallen Design	Citroën C5 TTA	8	(Sweden) Alx Danielsson	6–7
Brovallen Design	Citroën C5 TTA	9	(Sweden) Niclas Olsson	1–4
Brovallen Design	Citroën C5 TTA	10	(Sweden) Jocke Mangs	All
Brovallen Design	Citroën C5 TTA	86	(Sweden) Fredrik Magnusson	5
Team Tidö	Saab 9-3 TTA	3	(Norway) Roar Lindland	1–6
Team Tidö	Saab 9-3 TTA	7	(Sweden) Roger Samuelsson	7–8
PWR Racing	Saab 9-3 TTA	37	(Sweden) Daniel Haglöf	All
Picko Troberg Racing	Saab 9-3 TTA	69	(Sweden) Alexander Graff	1–7
Picko Troberg Racing	Saab 9-3 TTA	89	(Sweden) Daniel Roos	8
BMW Dealer Team	BMW SR TTA	4	(Sweden) Fredrik Larsson	All
BMW Dealer Team	BMW SR TTA	5	(Sweden) Richard Göransson	All
WestCoast Racing; Xlander Racing WCR	BMW SR TTA	6	(Sweden) Robin Rudholm	1–4, 8
WestCoast Racing; Xlander Racing WCR	BMW SR TTA	16	(Sweden) Philip Forsman	8
Volvo Polestar Racing	Volvo S60 TTA	11	(Sweden) Fredrik Ekblom	All
Volvo Polestar Racing	Volvo S60 TTA	12	(Sweden) Thed Björk	All
Volvo Polestar	Volvo S60 TTA	13	(Sweden) Carl Philip Bernadotte	All
Volvo Polestar Performance	Volvo S60 TTA	14	(Sweden) Robert Dahlgren	All
Volvo Polestar Performance	Volvo S60 TTA	15	(Sweden) Linus Ohlsson	All
Engström Motorsport	Honda Civic TTA	17	(Sweden) Tomas Engström	All
Dacia Dealer Team	Dacia SE TTA	20	(Sweden) Mattias Andersson	All

== Race calendar and results ==
All rounds were held in Sweden.

Round		Circuit	Date	Pole position	Fastest lap	Winning driver	Winning team
1	R1	Ring Knutstorp	4 May	(Sweden) Fredrik Larsson	(Sweden) Richard Göransson	(Sweden) Richard Göransson	BMW Dealer Team
1	R2	Ring Knutstorp	4 May	(Sweden) Richard Göransson	(Sweden) Richard Göransson	(Sweden) Thed Björk	Volvo Polestar Racing
2	R3	Solvalla	8 June	(Sweden) Thed Björk	(Sweden) Richard Göransson	(Sweden) Thed Björk	Volvo Polestar Racing
3	R4	Göteborg City Race	29 June	(Sweden) Richard Göransson	(Sweden) Thed Björk	(Sweden) Thed Björk	Volvo Polestar Racing
4	R5	Falkenbergs Motorbana	13 July	(Sweden) Fredrik Larsson	(Sweden) Fredrik Ekblom	(Sweden) Thed Björk	Volvo Polestar Racing
4	R6	Falkenbergs Motorbana	13 July	(Sweden) Linus Ohlsson	(Sweden) Linus Ohlsson	(Sweden) Linus Ohlsson	Volvo Polestar Performance
5	R7	Airport Race Östersund	10 August	(Sweden) Thed Björk	(Sweden) Robert Dahlgren	(Sweden) Thed Björk	Volvo Polestar Racing
6	R8	Karlskoga Motorstadion	24 August	(Sweden) Thed Björk	(Sweden) Thed Björk	(Sweden) Thed Björk	Volvo Polestar Racing
6	R9	Karlskoga Motorstadion	24 August	(Sweden) Thed Björk	(Sweden) Fredrik Ekblom	(Sweden) Thed Björk	Volvo Polestar Racing
7	R10	Tierp Arena	7 September	(Sweden) Thed Björk	(Sweden) Richard Göransson (Sweden) Fredrik Larsson	(Sweden) Richard Göransson	BMW Dealer Team
8	R11	Mantorp Park	21 September	(Sweden) Linus Ohlsson	(Sweden) Robin Rudholm	(Sweden) Linus Ohlsson	Volvo Polestar Performance
8	R12	Mantorp Park	21 September	(Sweden) Robert Dahlgren	(Sweden) Richard Göransson	(Sweden) Thed Björk	Volvo Polestar Racing

== Championship standings ==
=== Drivers' championship ===
Pos	Driver	KNU		SOL	GÖT	FAL		ÖST	KAR		TIE	MAN		Pts
1	(Sweden) Thed Björk	4	1^{2}	1^{1}	1^{3}	1	14†	1^{1}	1^{1}	1^{1}	3^{1}	4	1^{3}	258
2	(Sweden) Richard Göransson	1^{3}	2^{1}	5	4^{1}	4	4	5^{2}	5	3	1^{3}	Ret	9	161
3	(Sweden) Robert Dahlgren	2^{2}	4	2	2	12^{2}	5	2^{3}	2^{3}	6	Ret^{2}	5^{3}	2^{1}	160
4	(Sweden) Linus Ohlsson	5	5	4^{3}	11^{2}	11	1^{1}	3	3^{2}	Ret^{3}	5	1^{1}	4	146
5	(Sweden) Fredrik Ekblom	6	6	3	9	2^{3}	3^{3}	4	4	2^{2}	6	2^{2}	Ret	140
6	(Sweden) Fredrik Larsson	3^{1}	3^{3}	DSQ^{2}	6	Ret^{1}	2^{2}	Ret	6	4	2	11	14†	105
7	(Sweden) Jocke Mangs	8	8	Ret	8	5	7	6	8	Ret	7	3	3^{2}	78
8	(Sweden) Mattias Andersson	10	12	8	5	6	6	Ret	7	5	8	8	5	65
9	(Sweden) Daniel Haglöf	9	9	6	7	3	8	7	9	9	4	12	8	63
10	(Sweden) Robin Rudholm	7	7	Ret	3	10	9					7	11	36
11	(Sweden) Tomas Engström	15	13	10	Ret	9	13	Ret	10	7	NC	6	Ret	18
12	(Sweden) Andreas Wernersson											9	6	10
13	(Norway) Roar Lindland	11	Ret	7	14†	14†	12	8	11	Ret				10
14	(Sweden) Carl Philip Bernadotte	13	14	DNS	10	7	10	11	12	Ret	10	13	10	10
15	(Sweden) Alexander Graff	14	11	Ret	12	8	15†	9	Ret	Ret	9			8
16	(Sweden) Philip Forsman											10	7	7
17	(Sweden) Alx Danielsson								Ret	8	Ret			4
18	(Sweden) Niclas Olsson	12	10	9	13†	13	11							3
19	(Sweden) Fredrik Magnusson							10						1
	(Sweden) Roger Samuelsson										11	15	13	0
	(Sweden) Daniel Roos											14	12	0
Pos	Driver	KNU		SOL	GÖT	FAL		ÖST	KAR		TIE	MAN		Pts

Colour	Result
Gold	Winner
Silver	Second place
Bronze	Third place
Green	Points classification
Blue	Non-points classification
Blue	Non-classified finish (NC)
Purple	Retired, not classified (Ret)
Red	Did not qualify (DNQ)
Red	Did not pre-qualify (DNPQ)
Black	Disqualified (DSQ)
White	Did not start (DNS)
White	Withdrew (WD)
White	Race cancelled (C)
Blank	Did not practice (DNP)
Blank	Did not arrive (DNA)
Blank	Excluded (EX)

=== Manufacturers' championship ===
Pos.	Manufacturer	KNU		SOL	GÖT	FAL		ÖST	KAR		TIE	MAN		Points
1	Volvo	32	39	47	46	46	44	47	48	48	30	48	47	522
2	BMW	44	37	17	30	17	32	17	28	28	44	14	12	320
3	Citroën	12	16	6	8	11	12	18	8	6	8	22	27	154
4	Saab	12	12	22	12	21	8	18	8	4	16	3	8	144
5	Dacia	6	2	8	10	8	10	0	10	10	6	8	12	90
6	Honda	1	1	4	0	4	1	0	4	8	0	12	0	35
Pos.	Manufacturer	KNU		SOL	GÖT	FAL		ÖST	KAR		TIE	MAN		Points
