= 2012 TTA – Racing Elite League =

Seasons
- ← 2011 (STCC) 2013 (STCC) →

The 2012 TTA – Racing Elite League season was the only season of the new Racing Elite League run by the Touring Car Team Association. The championship was formed as a breakaway from the Scandinavian Touring Car Championship. Following the season, the two series announced their reunification, under the STCC name but with the TTA technical regulations. Fredrik Ekblom won the championship, driving for Volvo Polestar Racing.

== Teams and drivers ==
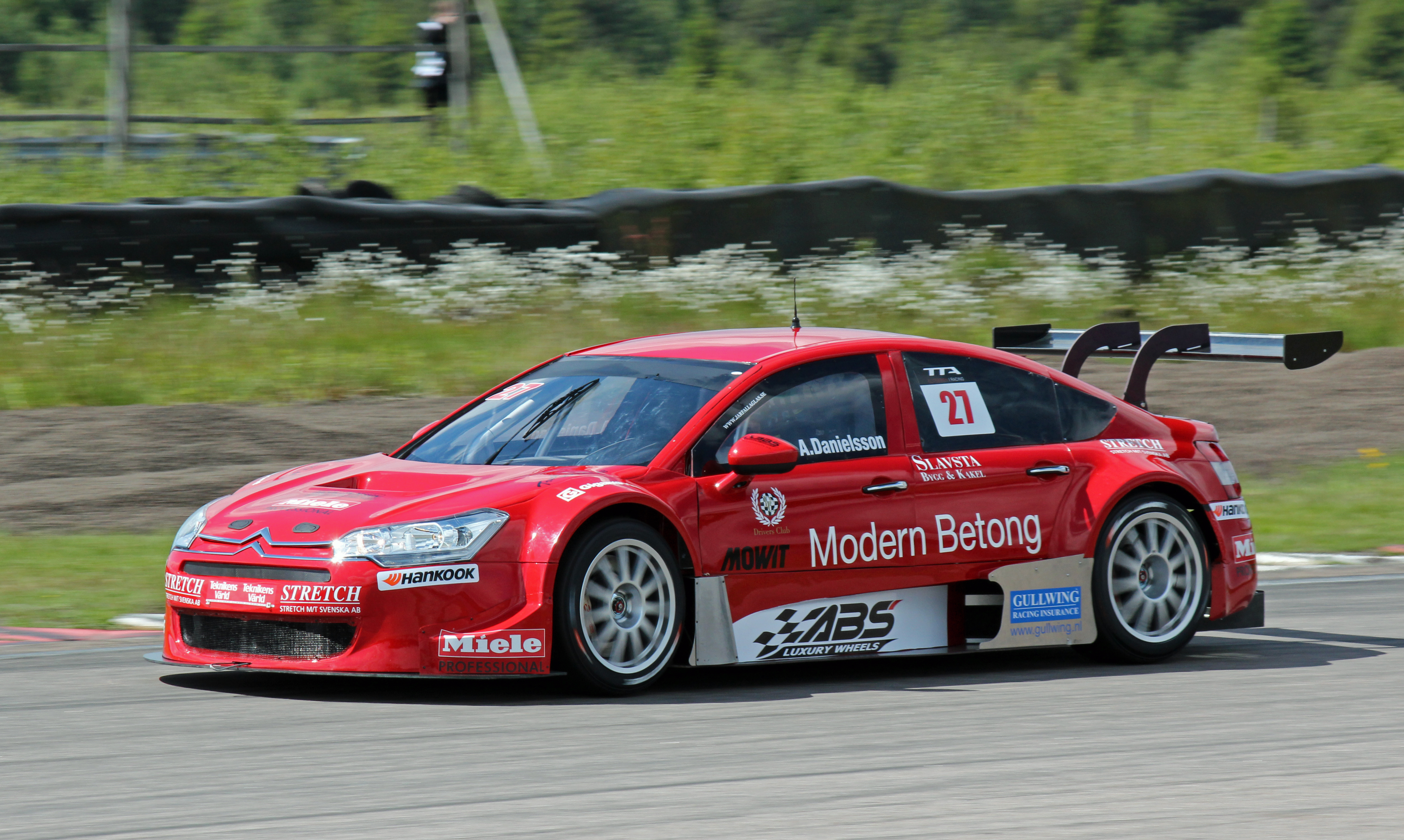
Alx Danielsson at Anderstorp Raceway.

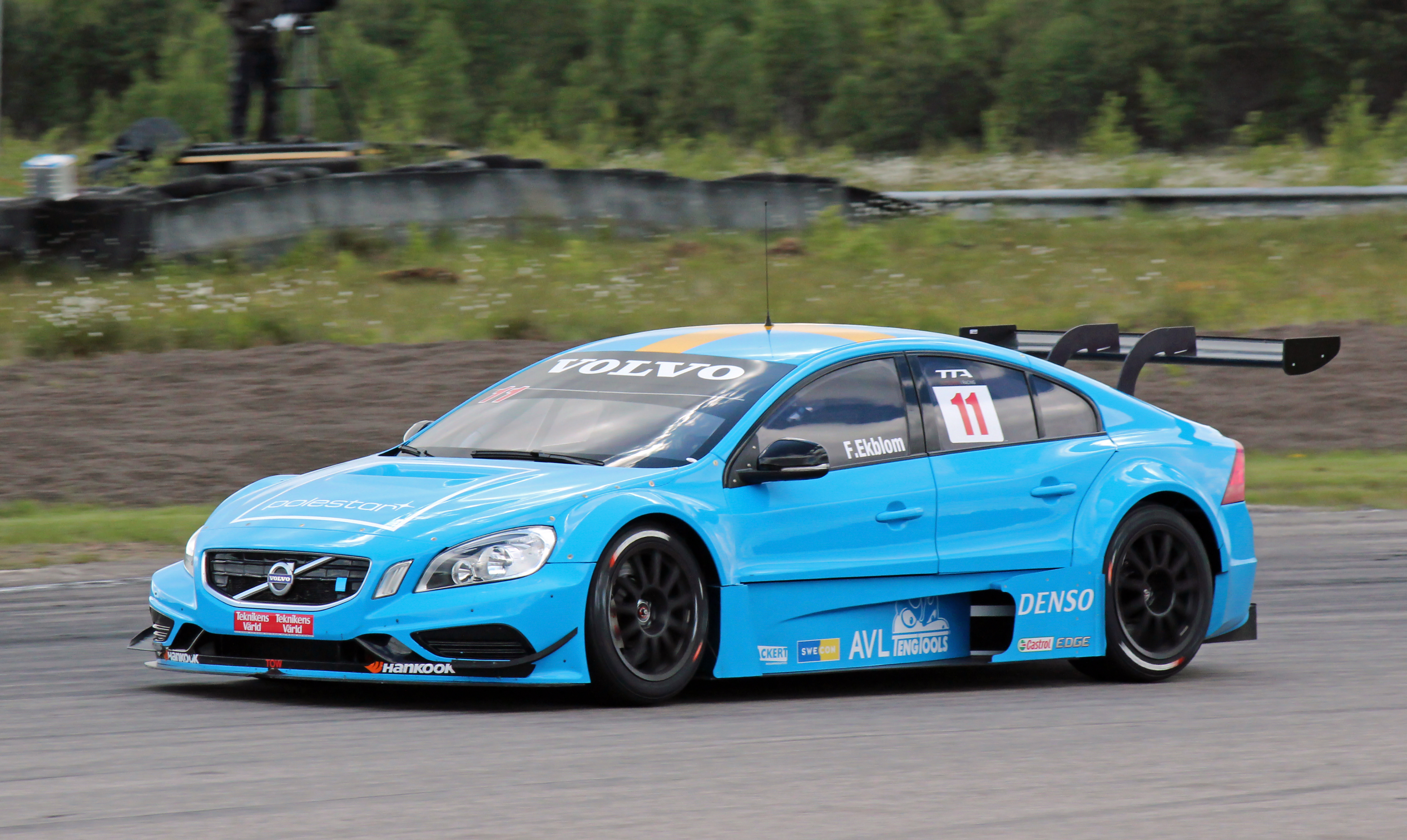
Fredrik Ekblom at Anderstorp Raceway.

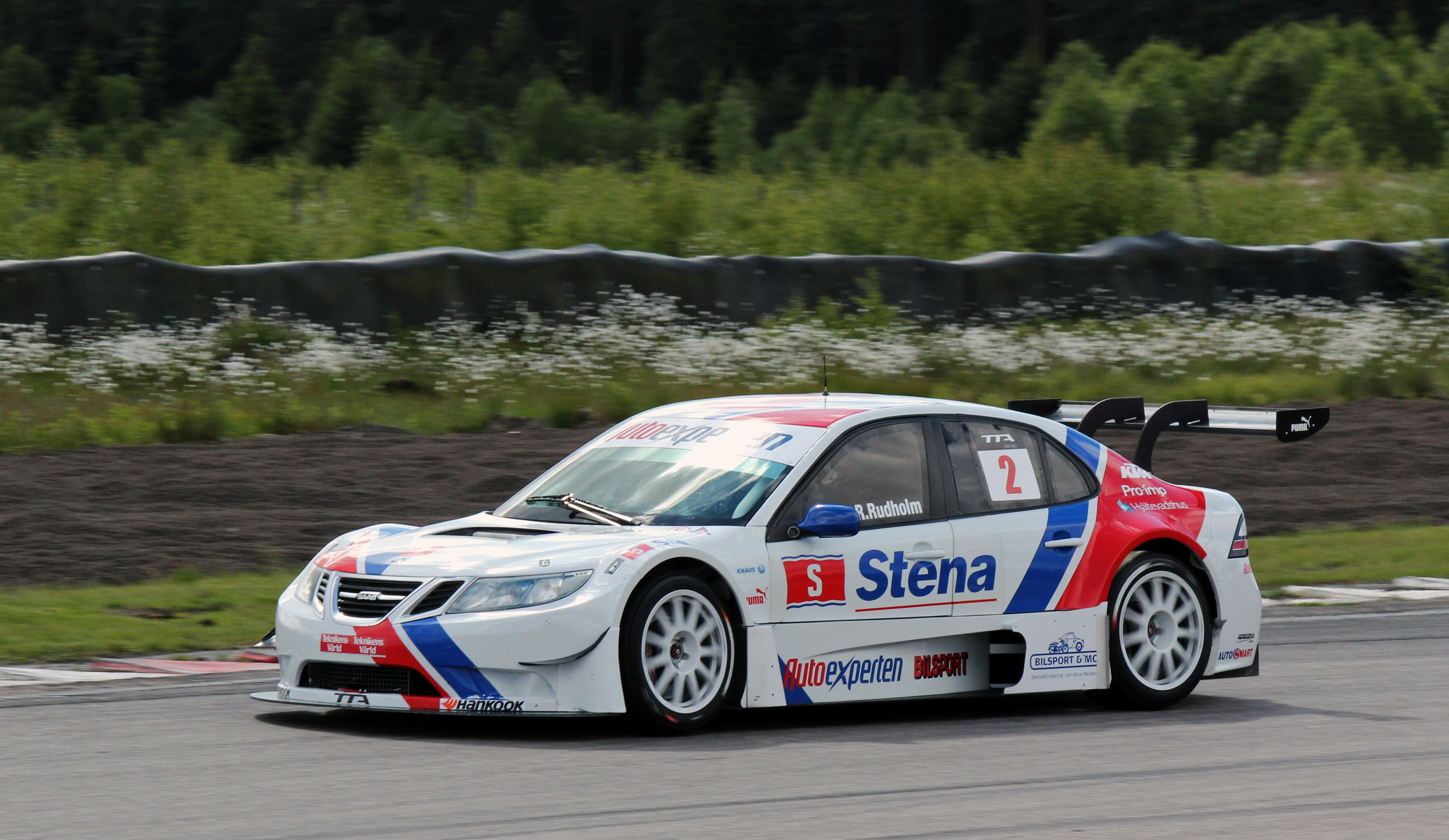
Robin Rudholm at Anderstorp Raceway.

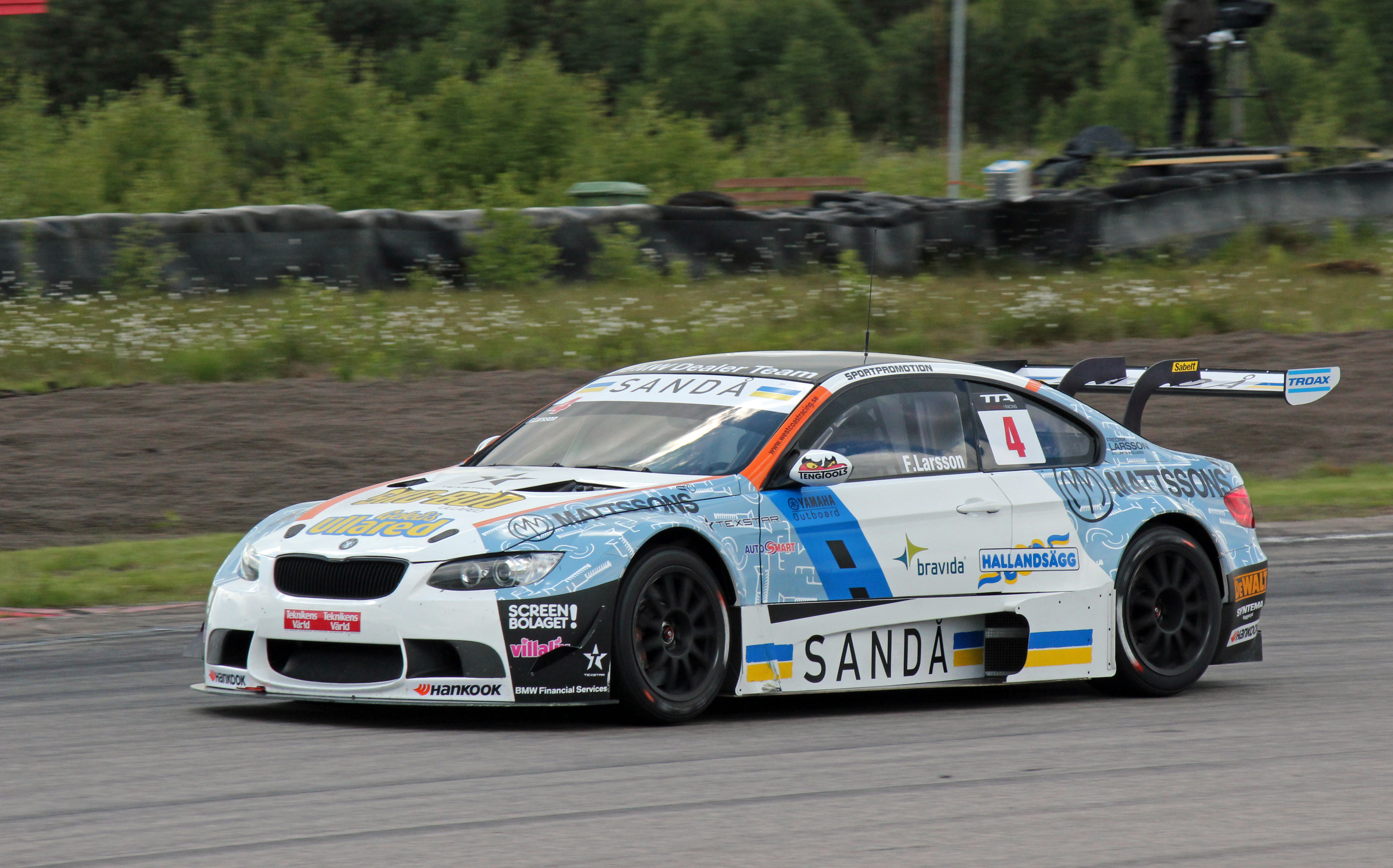
Fredrik Larsson at Anderstorp Raceway.

Team	Car	No.	Driver	Rounds
(Sweden) Flash Engineering	Saab 9–3 TTA	2	(Sweden) Robin Rudholm	All
(Sweden) Flash Engineering	Saab 9–3 TTA	20	(Sweden) Mattias Andersson	All
(Sweden) Team Tidö/PWR Racing	Saab 9–3 TTA	3	(Sweden) Linus Ohlsson	All
(Sweden) Team Tidö/PWR Racing	Saab 9–3 TTA	37	(Sweden) Daniel Haglöf	All
(Sweden) BMW Dealer Team WCR	BMW M3 TTA	4	(Sweden) Fredrik Larsson	All
(Sweden) BMW Dealer Team WCR	BMW M3 TTA	8	(Sweden) Richard Göransson	All
(Sweden) BMW Dealer Team WCR	BMW M3 TTA	43	(Netherlands) Duncan Huisman	8
(Sweden) WestCoast Racing	BMW M3 TTA	66	(Sweden) Martin Öhlin	All
(Sweden) WestCoast Racing	BMW M3 TTA	96	(Sweden) Andreas Ebbesson	1–6
(Sweden) Volvo Polestar Racing	Volvo S60 TTA	11	(Sweden) Fredrik Ekblom	All
(Sweden) Volvo Polestar Racing	Volvo S60 TTA	12	(Sweden) Thed Björk	All
(Sweden) Volvo Polestar Black R	Volvo S60 TTA	14	(Sweden) Robert Dahlgren	All
(Sweden) Volvo Polestar Black R	Volvo S60 TTA	15	(Norway) Tommy Rustad	All
(Sweden) Miele Professional Brovallen	Citroën C5 TTA	13	(Sweden) Markus Nyberg	4
(Sweden) Miele Professional Brovallen	Citroën C5 TTA	77	(Sweden) Stefan Söderberg	1–3, 5–8
(Sweden) Miele Professional Brovallen	Citroën C5 TTA	78	(Sweden) Viktor Hallrup	All
(Sweden) Brovallen Design	Citroën C5 TTA	27	(Sweden) Alx Danielsson	2–8
(Sweden) Brovallen Design	Citroën C5 TTA	54	(Sweden) Markus Nordenström	2
(Sweden) Brovallen Design	Citroën C5 TTA	76	(Sweden) Jocke Mangs	5–8
(Sweden) Brovallen Design	Citroën C5 TTA	79	(Sweden) Jan Brunstedt	1, 3–4
(Sweden) Brovallen Design	Citroën C5 TTA	80	(United Kingdom) Mark Miller	1

== Race calendar and results ==
Rnd	Date	Circuit	Pole position	Fastest lap	Winning driver	Winning team	Full results
1	12 May	(Sweden) Karlskoga Motorstadion	(Sweden) Linus Ohlsson	(Sweden) Fredrik Ekblom	(Sweden) Linus Ohlsson	(Sweden) Team Tidö/PWR Racing	
2	2 June	(Sweden) Anderstorp Raceway	(Sweden) Robert Dahlgren	(Sweden) Fredrik Ekblom	(Sweden) Fredrik Ekblom	(Sweden) Volvo Polestar Racing	
3	16 June	(Sweden) Göteborg City Race	(Sweden) Alx Danielsson	(Sweden) Fredrik Ekblom	(Sweden) Thed Björk	(Sweden) Volvo Polestar Racing	
4	7 July	(Sweden) Falkenbergs Motorbana	(Sweden) Richard Göransson	(Sweden) Fredrik Larsson	(Sweden) Richard Göransson	(Sweden) BMW Dealer Team WCR	
5	18 August	(Sweden) Karlskoga Motorstadion	(Sweden) Fredrik Ekblom	(Sweden) Linus Ohlsson	(Sweden) Fredrik Ekblom	(Sweden) Volvo Polestar Racing	
6	1 September	(Sweden) Anderstorp Raceway	(Sweden) Fredrik Larsson	(Sweden) Richard Göransson	(Sweden) Fredrik Larsson	(Sweden) BMW Dealer Team WCR	
7	15 September	(Sweden) Tierp Stockholm Arena	(Sweden) Jocke Mangs	(Sweden) Richard Göransson	(Sweden) Linus Ohlsson	(Sweden) Team Tidö/PWR Racing	
8	29 September	(Sweden) Göteborg City Race	(Sweden) Thed Björk	(Sweden) Fredrik Larsson	(Sweden) Thed Björk	(Sweden) Volvo Polestar Racing	

== Points standings ==
=== Drivers championship ===
Points are awarded to the top 10 classified finishers.

Position	1st	2nd	3rd	4th	5th	6th	7th	8th	9th	10th
Points	25	18	15	12	10	8	6	4	2	1

Points were also awarded to the top 3 in qualifying.

Position	1st	2nd	3rd
Points	3	2	1

The driver who sets the fastest lap will also receive 1 extra point.

Pos.	Driver	KAR	AND	GÖT	FAL	KAR	AND	TIE	GÖT	Points
1	(Sweden) Fredrik Ekblom	2^{2}	1^{2}	5	4	1^{1}	2^{2}	2	4^{3}	151
2	(Sweden) Linus Ohlsson	1^{1}	7	9	2^{2}	4^{3}	4	1^{2}	3^{2}	126
3	(Sweden) Thed Björk	4	Ret	1^{2}	6	2	3^{3}	4	1^{1}	121
4	(Sweden) Fredrik Larsson	5	3	Ret	3	Ret	1^{1}	3	12	85
5	(Sweden) Robert Dahlgren	Ret	2^{1}	3^{3}	7^{3}	5	10	8	5	69
6	(Sweden) Richard Göransson	3^{3}	5	Ret	1^{1}	12	9	11	Ret	58
7	(Sweden) Martin Öhlin	7	10	12	9	3^{2}	5	10	6	45
8	(Sweden) Alx Danielsson		6	2^{1}	Ret	7	6	DNS	DNS	43
9	(Norway) Tommy Rustad	Ret	4	6	8	11	8	6	7	42
10	(Sweden) Daniel Haglöf	8	DNS	4	10	10	14	12^{3}	2	37
11	(Sweden) Robin Rudholm	6	Ret^{3}	11	5	9	7	7	Ret	33
12	(Sweden) Andreas Ebbesson	10	8	7	11	6	Ret			19
13	(Sweden) Mattias Andersson	11	11	8	12	Ret	13	5	Ret	14
14	(Sweden) Stefan Söderberg	9	9	10		8	12	13	Ret	9
15	(Netherlands) Duncan Huisman								8	4
16	(Sweden) Viktor Hallrup	Ret	12	Ret	13	Ret	Ret	9	9	4
17	(Sweden) Jocke Mangs					Ret	11	DSQ^{1}	10	4
	(Sweden) Jan Brunstedt	12		Ret	Ret					0
	(Sweden) Markus Nyberg				Ret					0
	(Sweden) Markus Nordenström		13							0
	(United Kingdom) Mark Miller	DNS								0
Pos.	Driver	KAR	AND	GÖT	FAL	KAR	AND	TIE	GÖT	Points

Notes:

- ^{1} ^{2} ^{3} refers to the classification of the drivers in qualifying, where bonus points are awarded 3–2–1 for the fastest three drivers.
- italics signifies fastest lap.

=== Teams championship ===
Pos.	Team	No.	KAR	AND	GÖT	FAL	KAR	AND	TIE	GÖT	Points
1	(Sweden) Volvo Polestar Racing	11	2^{2}	1^{2}	5	4	1^{1}	2^{2}	2	4^{3}	272
1	(Sweden) Volvo Polestar Racing	12	4	Ret	1^{2}	6	2	3^{3}	4	1^{1}	272
2	(Sweden) Team Tidö/PWR Racing	3	1^{1}	7	9	2^{2}	4^{3}	4	1^{2}	3^{2}	163
2	(Sweden) Team Tidö/PWR Racing	37	8	DNS	4	10	10	14	12^{3}	2	163
3	(Sweden) BMW Dealer Team WCR	4	5	3	Ret	3	Ret	1^{1}	3	12	143
3	(Sweden) BMW Dealer Team WCR	8	3^{3}	5	Ret	1^{1}	12	9	11	Ret	143
4	(Sweden) Volvo Polestar Black R	14	Ret	2^{1}	3^{3}	7^{3}	5	10	8	5	111
4	(Sweden) Volvo Polestar Black R	15	Ret	4	6	8	11	8	6	7	111
5	(Sweden) WestCoast Racing	66	7	10	12	9	3^{2}	5	10	6	68
5	(Sweden) WestCoast Racing	96	10	8	7	11	6	Ret			68
6	(Sweden) Brovallen Design	27		6	2^{1}	Ret	7	6	DNS	DNS	47
6	(Sweden) Brovallen Design	54		13							47
6	(Sweden) Brovallen Design	76					Ret	11	DSQ^{1}	10	47
6	(Sweden) Brovallen Design	79	12		Ret	Ret					47
6	(Sweden) Brovallen Design	80	DNS								47
7	(Sweden) Flash Engineering	2	6	Ret^{3}	11	5	9	7	7	Ret	47
7	(Sweden) Flash Engineering	20	11	11	8	12	Ret	13	5	Ret	47
8	(Sweden) Miele Professional Brovallen	13				Ret					13
8	(Sweden) Miele Professional Brovallen	77	9	9	10		8	12	13	Ret	13
8	(Sweden) Miele Professional Brovallen	78	Ret	12	Ret	13	Ret	Ret	9	9	13
Pos.	Team	No.	KAR	AND	GÖT	FAL	KAR	AND	TIE	GÖT	Points

Notes:

- ^{1} ^{2} ^{3} refers to the classification of the drivers in qualifying, where bonus points are awarded 3–2–1 for the fastest three drivers.

=== Manufacturers championship ===
Pos.	Manufacturer	KAR	AND	GÖT	FAL	KAR	AND	TIE	GÖT	Points
1	Volvo	33	49	44	21	46	36	30	41	300
2	Saab	36	7	16	30	16	18	38	35	196
3	BMW	26	25	6	44	25	39	17	13	195
4	Citroën	2	10	22	0	10	8	5	3	60
Pos.	Manufacturer	KAR	AND	GÖT	FAL	KAR	AND	TIE	GÖT	Points
