= Robert Dahlgren =

Swedish auto racing driver

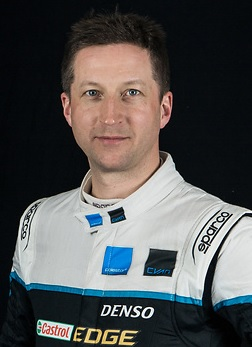
- Robert Dahlgren in April 2016
- Nationality: (Sweden) Swedish
- Born: Björn Thomas Robert Dahlgren; 1 December 1979 (age 46) Skellefteå, Sweden

V8 Supercars Australia career
- Debut season: 2014
- Current team: Garry Rogers Motorsport
- Car number: 34
- Starts: 37
- Wins: 0
- Poles: 0
- Fastest laps: 0
- Best finish: 25th in 2014

Previous series
- 1999 2000–01 2002–03 2007–11, 2016: Swedish Formula Ford; British Formula Ford; British F3; WTCC

Championship titles
- 2001 2010 2017, 2019: British Formula Ford; Scandinavian Touring Car Cup; Scandinavian Touring Car Championship

Björn Thomas Robert Dahlgren (born 1 December 1979 in Skellefteå) is a Swedish auto racing driver who currently competes for the Scandinavian Touring Car Championship. He previously competed in Australia and New Zealand for a single season in the V8 Supercars Championship for Garry Rogers Motorsport, as well as in the World and for Polestar Racing, making him the longest-serving factory-supported Volvo driver.

== Career ==
In 1998, Dahlgren won the Nordic and Swedish Formula Ford Championships, before racing in Great Britain with Formula Ford. He won the Formula Ford Championship in 2001. He switched to British Formula 3 in 2002, finishing seventeenth in his first year. In his second year, he finished ninth on points in 2003. Since 2004, he has competed in the STCC, every season with Volvo. He has finished as runner-up twice in 2004 and 2007.

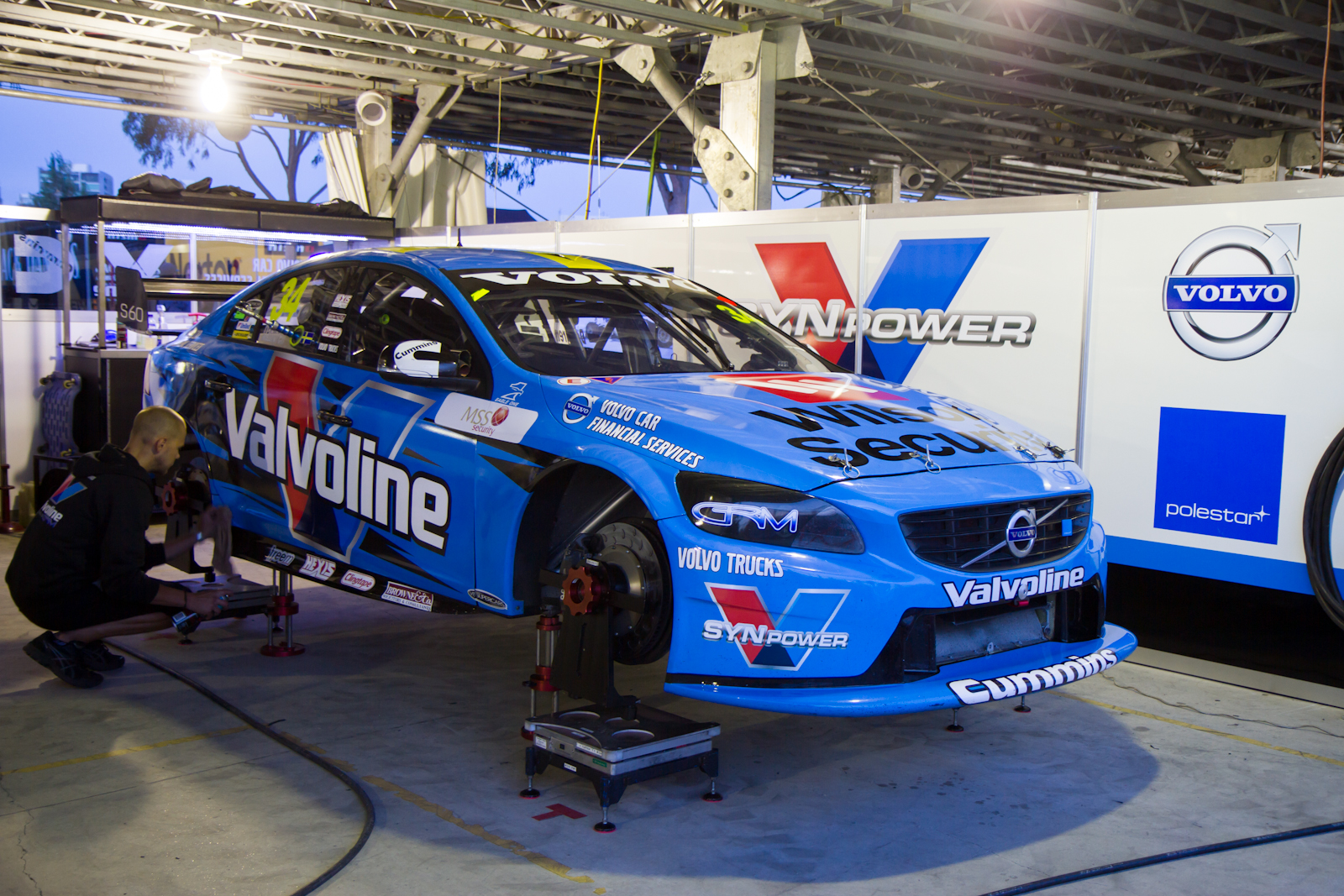
The Volvo S60 V8 Supercar of Robert Dahlgren in 2014

For 2014, Dahlgren has been named to drive for Volvo in the International V8 Supercars Championship in Australia for Garry Rogers Motorsport, under the guise of Volvo Polestar Racing Australia. He finished 25th and last among full-season drivers, with no top-tens.

In 2016, Dahlgren joined Polestar Cyan Racing to compete at the 2016 Scandinavian Touring Car Championship with a Volvo S60, ranking second in points. He also entered three rounds of the 2016 World Touring Car Championship with the team, finishing seventh at Qatar race 1.

For the 2017 TCR Scandinavia Touring Car Championship, Dahlgren moved to PWR Racing to drive a factory-supported SEAT León, winning the title. In 2019, he took his second STCC title for PWR Racing.

In June 2022, Dahlgren won the STCC TCR Scandinavia Championship representing Cupra. He beat Tobias Brink from the Audi team by 2 seconds.

== Racing record ==
=== Complete World Touring Car Championship results ===
(key) (Races in bold indicate pole position) (Races in italics indicate fastest lap)

Year	Team	Car	1	2	3	4	5	6	7	8	9	10	11	12	13	14	15	16	17	18	19	20	21	22	23	24	DC	Points
2007	Polestar Racing	Volvo S60 Flexifuel	BRA; 1	BRA; 2	NED; 1	NED; 2	ESP; 1	ESP; 2	FRA; 1	FRA; 2	CZE; 1	CZE; 2	POR; 1	POR; 2	SWE; 1; 10	SWE; 2; 8	GER; 1	GER; 2	GBR; 1	GBR; 2	ITA; 1	ITA; 2	MAC; 1	MAC; 2			NC†	0†
2008	Volvo Olsbergs Green Racing	Volvo C30	BRA; 1	BRA; 2	MEX; 1	MEX; 2	ESP; 1	ESP; 2	FRA; 1	FRA; 2	CZE; 1	CZE; 2	POR; 1	POR; 2	GBR; 1; 24	GBR; 2 DNS	GER; 1	GER; 2	EUR; 1	EUR; 2	ITA; 1	ITA; 2	JPN; 1	JPN; 2	MAC; 1	MAC; 2	NC†	0†
2009	Volvo Olsbergs Green Racing	Volvo C30	BRA; 1	BRA; 2	MEX; 1	MEX; 2	MAR; 1	MAR; 2	FRA; 1	FRA; 2	ESP; 1	ESP; 2	CZE; 1	CZE; 2	POR; 1	POR; 2	GBR; 1; 15	GBR; 2; 14	GER; 1	GER; 2	ITA; 1	ITA; 2	JPN; 1	JPN; 2	MAC; 1	MAC; 2	NC†	0†
2010	Volvo Olsbergs Green Racing	Volvo C30	BRA; 1	BRA; 2	MAR; 1	MAR; 2	ITA; 1	ITA; 2	BEL; 1	BEL; 2	POR; 1	POR; 2	GBR; 1; 12	GBR; 2 Ret	CZE; 1	CZE; 2	GER; 1	GER; 2	ESP; 1	ESP; 2	JPN; 1; 8	JPN; 2; 5	MAC; 1	MAC; 2			NC†	0†
2011	Polestar Racing	Volvo C30	BRA; 1; 12	BRA; 2; 13	BEL; 1; 13	BEL; 2; 7	ITA; 1; 15	ITA; 2; 13	HUN; 1 NC	HUN; 2; 9																	11th	72
2011	Polestar Racing	Volvo C30 Drive									CZE; 1; 6	CZE; 2; 9	POR; 1; 7	POR; 2; 16	GBR; 1; 8	GBR; 2; 6	GER; 1; 4	GER; 2; 7	ESP; 1; 9	ESP; 2; 9	JPN; 1 Ret	JPN; 2; 5	CHN; 1; 9	CHN; 2; 9	MAC; 1 DNS	MAC; 2 DNS	11th	72
2016	Polestar Cyan Racing	Volvo S60 Polestar TC1	FRA; 1	FRA; 2	SVK; 1	SVK; 2	HUN; 1	HUN; 2	MAR; 1	MAR; 2	GER; 1	GER; 2	RUS; 1	RUS; 2	POR; 1; 13	POR; 2 Ret	ARG; 1; 16	ARG; 2; 16	JPN; 1	JPN; 2	CHN; 1	CHN; 2	QAT; 1; 7	QAT; 2 Ret			19th	6

^{†} Not permitted to score points.

=== Complete Scandinavian Touring Car Championship results ===
(key) (Races in bold indicate pole position) (Races in italics indicate fastest lap)

Year	Team	Car	1	2	3	4	5	6	7	8	9	10	11	12	13	14	15	16	17	18	19	20	21	DC	Points
2011	Polestar Racing	Volvo C30	JYL; 1	JYL; 2	KNU; 1	KNU; 2	MAN; 1	MAN; 2	GÖT; 1	GÖT; 2	FAL; 1	FAL; 2	KAR; 1	KAR; 2	JYL; 1	JYL; 2	KNU; 1; 3	KNU; 2; 4	MAN; 1; 6	MAN; 2; 1				14th	60
2013	Volvo Polestar Performance	Volvo S60 TTA	KNU; 1; 2	KNU; 2; 4	SOL; 1; 2	GÖT; 1; 2	FAL; 1; 12	FAL; 2; 5	ÖST; 1; 2	KAR; 1; 2	KAR; 2; 6	TIE; 1 Ret	MAN; 1; 5	**MAN**; **2**; 2										**3rd**	**160**
2016	Polestar Cyan Racing	Volvo S60 TTA	**SKÖ**; **1**; 1	SKÖ; 2; 2	MAN; 1; 5	MAN; 2; 1	AND; 1; 2	AND; 2; 5	FAL; 1 Ret	FAL; 2 Ret	**KAR**; **1**; 1	KAR; 2; 5	SOL; 1 Ret	SOL; 2; 2	KNU; 1; 3	KNU; 2; 2								**2nd**	**300**
2017	SEAT Dealer Team – PWR Racing	Cupra León TCR	KNU; 1; 1	**KNU**; **2**; 1	KNU; 3; 2	ALA; 1; 4	ALA; 2; 3	ALA; 3; 5	SOL; 1; 2	SOL; 2; 2	SOL; 3; 1	FAL; 1; 4	FAL; 2; 2	FAL; 3; 2	KAR; 1; 1	KAR; 2; 3	**KAR**; **3**; 1	AND; 1; 3	AND; 2; 1	**AND**; **3**; 1	MAN; 1; 6	MAN; 2; 8	MAN; 3; 3	**1st**	**374**
2018	SEAT Dealer Team – PWR Racing	Cupra León TCR	KNU; 1; 2	KNU; 2; 2	AND; 1; 3	AND; 2; 2	**FAL**; **1**; 1	FAL; 2; 6	KAR; 1; 5	KAR; 2; 7	RUD; 1; 2	RUD; 2; 3	MAN; 1; 3	MAN; 2 Ret										**2nd**	**185**
2019	PWR Racing	Cupra León TCR	KNU; 1; 2	KNU; 2; 6	**AND**; **1**; 1	AND; 2; 5	SKE; 1; 2	SKE; 2; 1	**FAL**; **1**; 2	FAL; 2; 3	**KAR**; **1**; 2	KAR; 2 Ret	**JYL**; **1**; 1	JYL; 2; 3	MAN; 1; 3	MAN; 2; 4								**1st**	**252**
2020	PWR Racing	Cupra León Competición TCR	KAR; 1; 5	KAR; 2; 1	KAR; 3; 7	**SKE**; **1**; 1	**SKE**; **2**; 1	SKE; 3 Ret	MAN; 1; 5	MAN; 2; 6	MAN; 3; 2	**KNU**; **1**; 2	**KNU**; **2**; 1	KNU; 3; 2										2nd	202
2021	Cupra Dealer Team – PWR Racing	Cupra León Competición TCR	**LJU**; **1**; 1	**LJU**; **2**; 1	LJU; 3; 3	**SKE**; **1**; 1	**SKE**; **2**; 1	SKE; 3; 2	**KAR**; **1**; 1	**KAR**; **2**; 1	KAR; 3; 5	**AND**; **1**; 1	**AND**; **2**; 1	AND; 3; 4	**MAN**; **1**; 1	MAN; 2; 1	MAN; 3; 2	**KNU**; **1**; 2	**KNU**; **2**; 1	KNU; 3; 5				1st	350
2022	Cupra Dealer Team – PWR Racing	Cupra León Competición TCR	**LJU**; **1**; 1	SKE; 1 DSQ	SKE; 2; 7	SKE; 3; 1	**KNU**; **1**; 1	**KNU**; **2**; 1	KNU; 3; 1	KAR; 1; 2	KAR; 2; 8	KAR; 3; 1	AND; 1; 2	AND; 2; 3	AND; 3; 2	MAN; 1; 3	MAN; 2; 4	MAN; 3; 3						1st	266
2024	Cupra Dealer Team – PWR Racing	Cupra Born e-Racer	GBG; 1; 4	GBG; 2; 1	LJU; 1; 2	LJU; 2; 6	KNU; 1; 3	KNU; 2; 6	KNU; 3; 6	KNU; 4; 6	MAN; 1; 4	MAN; 2; 3												4th	145

=== Complete TTA – Racing Elite League results ===
(key) (Races in bold indicate pole position) (Races in italics indicate fastest lap)

Year	Team	Car	1	2	3	4	5	6	7	8	DC	Points
2012	Volvo Polestar Black R	Volvo S60 TTA	KAR; Ret	**AND**; 2	GÖT; 3	FAL; 7	KAR; 5	AND; 10	TIE; 8	GÖT; 5	5th	69

=== Complete V8 Supercar results ===
Year	Team	Car	1	2	3	4	5	6	7	8	9	10	11	12	13	14	15	16	17	18	19	20	21	22	23	24	25	26	27	28	29	30	31	32	33	34	35	36	37	38	Position	Points
2014	Garry Rogers Motorsport	Volvo S60	ADE; R1; 21	ADE; R2; 23	ADE; R3; Ret	SYM; R4; 20	SYM; R5; 16	SYM; R6; 23	WIN; R7; Ret	WIN; R8; 24	WIN; R9; 24	PUK; R10; 22	PUK; R11; Ret	PUK; R12; 21	PUK; R13; 23	BAR; R14; 24	BAR; R15; 24	BAR; R16; 21	HID; R17; 23	HID; R18; 18	HID; R19; Ret	TOW; R20; 19	TOW; R21; 22	TOW; R22; 22	QLD; R23; 23	QLD; R24; 22	QLD; R25; 16	SMP; R26; 19	SMP; R27; Ret	SMP; R28; DNS	SAN; R29; 17	BAT; R30; Ret	SUR; R31; 13	SUR; R32; 17	PHI; R33; 22	PHI; R34; 23	PHI; R35; 21	SYD; R36; 18	SYD; R37; 18	SYD; R38; Ret	25th	921

=== Complete Bathurst 1000 results ===
Year	Team	Car	Co-driver	Position	Laps
2014	Garry Rogers Motorsport	Volvo S60	(Australia) Greg Ritter	DNF	114

=== Complete World Touring Car Cup results ===
(key) (Races in bold indicate pole position) (Races in italics indicate fastest lap)

Year	Team	Car	1	2	3	4	5	6	7	8	9	10	11	12	13	14	15	16	17	18	19	20	21	22	23	24	25	26	27	28	29	30	DC	Points
2019	PWR Racing	CUPRA León TCR	MAR; 1	MAR; 2	MAR; 3	HUN; 1	HUN; 2	HUN; 3	SVK; 1	SVK; 2	SVK; 3	NED; 1	NED; 2	NED; 3	GER; 1	GER; 2	GER; 3	POR; 1	POR; 2	POR; 3	CHN; 1	CHN; 2	CHN; 3	JPN; 1	JPN; 2	JPN; 3	MAC; 1; 13	MAC; 2; 20	MAC; 3; 24	MAL; 1	MAL; 2	MAL; 3	27th	3

Sporting positions
Preceded by James Courtney	British Formula Ford Championship; Champion; 2001	Succeeded by Westley Barber
Preceded by Richard Göransson	TCR Scandinavia Touring Car Championship; Champion; 2017	Succeeded by Johan Kristoffersson
Preceded by Johan Kristoffersson	STCC TCR Scandinavia Touring Car Championship; Champion; 2019	Succeeded by Robert Huff
Preceded by Robert Huff	STCC TCR Scandinavia Touring Car Championship; Champion; 2021 - 2022	Succeeded by Incumbent
