= Tierp Arena =

Motorsport race track in Tierp, Sweden

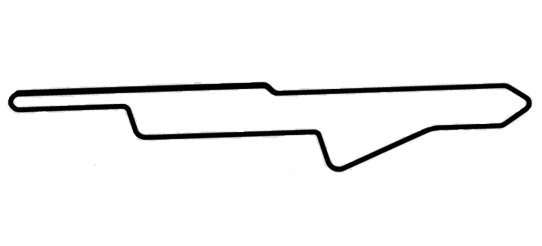
- Full Circuit (2013–present)
- Location: Tierp, Uppsala County, Sweden
- Coordinates: 60°20.65′N 17°27′E
- Capacity: 20,000
- Opened: 2011
- Major events: Current: European Drag Racing Championship (2011–2019, 2022–present); Former: STCC (2013); Porsche Carrera Cup Scandinavia (2013); TTA – Racing Elite League (2012)
- Website: http://tierparena.com/

Full Circuit (2013–present)
- Length: 2.080 km (1.292 mi)
- Turns: 10
- Race lap record: 0:55.886 ( (Sweden) Richard Göransson/Fredrik Larsson, BMW SR TTA, 2013, Silhouette racing car)

Original Circuit (2012)
- Length: 2.075 km (1.289 mi)
- Turns: 12
- Race lap record: 0:55.612 ( (Sweden) Richard Göransson, BMW SR TTA, 2012, Silhouette racing car)

The Tierp Arena is a 2.080 km (1.292 mi) motorsport venue in Tierp, Uppsala County, Sweden, located 120 km (75 mi) from Stockholm. Tierp Arena is one of the most modern drag racing arenas in the world, with capacity for 20,000 spectators.

A new 2.075 km (1.289 mi) racing circuit was constructed for the 2012 TTA – Racing Elite League. The track is built with F1 tracks like Hockenheim and Silverstone as model. Four-time Swedish champion Richard Göransson has been advisor. The track offers one of Sweden's longest straights, open hairpins and fast, challenging corners. TTA raced on the track on 15 September. The merged STCC – Racing Elite League visited the track in September 2013.

== Lap records ==
As of September 2013, the fastest official race lap records at the Tierp Arena are listed as:

Category	Time	Driver	Vehicle	Event
Full Circuit (2013–present): 2.080 km (1.292 mi)
Silhouette racing car	0:55.886	Richard Göransson (Note: Both drivers took the same lap time independently.); Fredrik Larsson	BMW SR TTA	2013 Tierp STCC round
Porsche Carrera Cup	0:56.274	Johan Kristoffersson	Porsche 911 (997 II) GT3 Cup	2013 Tierp Porsche Carrera Cup Scandinavia round
Original Circuit (2012): 2.075 km (1.289 mi)
Silhouette racing car	0:55.612	Richard Göransson	BMW SR TTA	2012 Tierp TTA round
Porsche Carrera Cup	0:57.790	Peter Jervemyr	Porsche 911 (997 II) GT3 Cup	2012 Tierp Carrera GT Cup round
Ferrari Challenge	0:58.001	Peter Wallenberg Jr.	Ferrari 458 Challenge	2012 Tierp Swedish GT round
