= Daniel Haglöf =

Swedish racing driver

- Nationality: (Sweden) Swedish
- Born: Lars Daniel Haglöf; 9 October 1978 (age 48) Stockholm, Sweden

World Touring Car Cup career
- Debut season: 2019
- Current team: PWR Racing
- Car number: 37
- Starts: 27
- Wins: 0
- Podiums: 1
- Poles: 0
- Fastest laps: 1

Previous series
- 2013–18 2010–16 2012 2011 2005: STCC; Swedish GT Championship; TTA – Racing Elite League; Porsche Carrera Cup Scandinavia; Swedish Touring Car Championship

Championship titles
- 2015 2014 2009 2002, 2004 2001: Swedish GT Championship – GTA; GT4 Nordic Cup; Mini Challenge Germany; Volvo S60 Challenge Sweden; Volvo S40 Junior Touring Car Cup

Lars Daniel Haglöf (born October 9, 1978 in Stockholm) is a Swedish auto racing driver who currently competes in the World Touring Car Cup and is co-founder of PWR Racing. He previously competed mainly in his native Sweden including the Scandinavian Touring Car Championship and Porsche Carrera Cup Scandinavia.

== Career ==
After winning the MKR series Sweden ICA karting series in 1995 and 1996, Haglöf switched to touring cars, entering in the Volvo S40 Junior Touring Car Cup in 1997. He raced in the series for 5 seasons, winning it in 2001 and finishing 2nd the year before. For 2002 he moved to the Volvo S60 Challenge Sweden winning four races en route to the title in his debut season and later winning it again in 2004. In 2005 he made his debut in the Swedish Touring Car Championship competing in 8 races. He also entered the Dubai 24 Hour race, finishing second in the A5 class in 2007. In 2008 Haglöf moved to the Mini Challenge Germany, finishing third in his debut season and winning the championship the following year. In 2011 Haglöf entered the Porsche Carrera Cup Scandinavia, finishing 6th.

In 2012 Haglöf formed PWR Racing along with fellow racing driver and businessman Peter Wallenberg Jr. to compete in the inaugural TTA – Racing Elite League. Haglöf was one of the team's drivers, driving a Saab 9–3 TTA and finishing 10th. When TTA – Racing Elite League and the Scandinavian Touring Car Championship merged, PWR Racing and Haglöf moved to the STCC as well. In 2014 Haglöf stepped down from full-time racing to concentrate on the management of the team, but returned for the final round of the season at Solvalla and Mantorp Park. Since 2015 Haglöf returned to full-time racing duties. In 2018 he finished 3rd in the drivers standings, behind Johan Kristoffersson and Robert Dahlgren.

Alongside his commitments in the Scandinavian Touring Car Championship, Haglöf also competed in GT racing in Sweden. After finishing second in the GTA class of the Swedish GT Championship, he won the GT4 Nordic Cup in 2014 and the Swedish GT Championship in the GTA class in 2015.

In 2019 Haglöf will enter the World Touring Car Cup, driving for his PWR Racing team in CUPRA León TCR alongside Mikel Azcona.

== Racing record ==
=== Complete World Touring Car Cup results ===
(key) (Races in bold indicate pole position) (Races in italics indicate fastest lap)

Year	Team	Car	1	2	3	4	5	6	7	8	9	10	11	12	13	14	15	16	17	18	19	20	21	22	23	24	25	26	27	28	29	30	DC	Points
2019	PWR Racing	CUPRA León TCR	MAR; 1; 20	MAR; 2; 16	MAR; 3; 10	HUN; 1; 11	HUN; 2; 3	HUN; 3; 24	SVK; 1; 19	SVK; 2; 20	SVK; 3 Ret	NED; 1; 12	NED; 2; 19	NED; 3; 23	GER; 1 Ret	GER; 2; 17	GER; 3 Ret	POR; 1; 23	POR; 2; 21	POR; 3 Ret	CHN; 1 Ret	CHN; 2; 5	CHN; 3 Ret	JPN; 1; 20	JPN; 2; 26	JPN; 3; 24†	MAC; 1	MAC; 2	MAC; 3	MAL; 1; 7	MAL; 2 Ret	MAL; 3; 13	23rd	59

^{†} Driver did not finish the race, but was classified as he completed over 90% of the race distance.
