= Cyan Racing =

Racing team

(Sweden) Cyan Racing
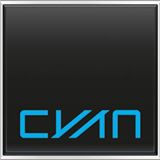
- Founded: 1996 (as Flash Engineering) 2005 (as Polestar Racing)
- Team principal(s): Christian Dahl
- Current series: TCR World Tour
- Former series: World Touring Car Cup; World Touring Car Championship; Swedish GT; Scandinavian Touring Car Championship; TTA – Racing Elite League; V8 Supercars (via GRM)
- Current drivers: (Sweden) Thed Björk (Uruguay) Santiago Urrutia (China) Ma Qing Hua (France) Yann Ehrlacher (France) Yvan Muller
- Teams' Championships: 13 (STCC: 2002, 2003, 2009, 2010, 2012, 2013, 2014, 2015, 2016, WTCC: 2017), WTCR: 2019, 2020, 2021)
- Drivers' Championships: 11 (STCC: 1996, 1997, 2009, 2012, 2013, 2014, 2015, 2016, WTCC: 2017, WTCR: 2020, 2021)

Cyan Racing is the official motorsport partner to Geely Group Motorsport, formerly the Volvo factory auto racing team, and runs the FIA WTCR programme for Lynk & Co, based in Gothenburg, Sweden. The team’s current drivers are Thed Björk, Yvan Muller, Yann Ehrlacher, Santiago Urrutia and Ma Qing Hua who will drive the Lynk & Co 03 TCR race car.

The team was founded by Jan "Flash" Nilsson as Flash Engineering in 1996. Christian Dahl bought the team in 2005 and renamed it Polestar Racing. After Dahl sold the Polestar performance road car division to Volvo, the team was renamed Cyan Racing.

== History ==
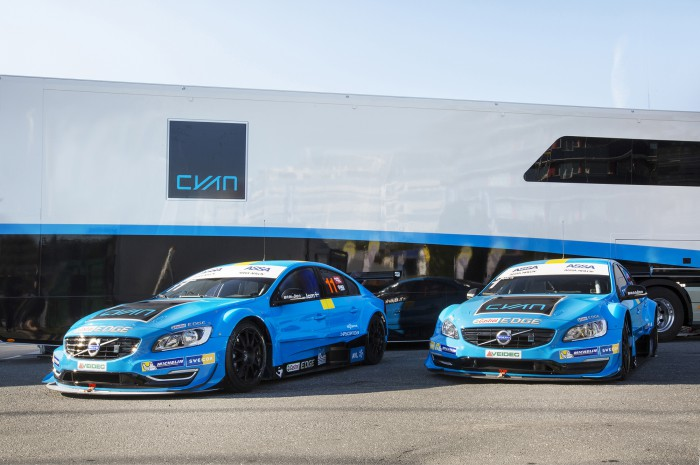
Volvo S60 Solution F of Cyan Racing in the 2015 STCC

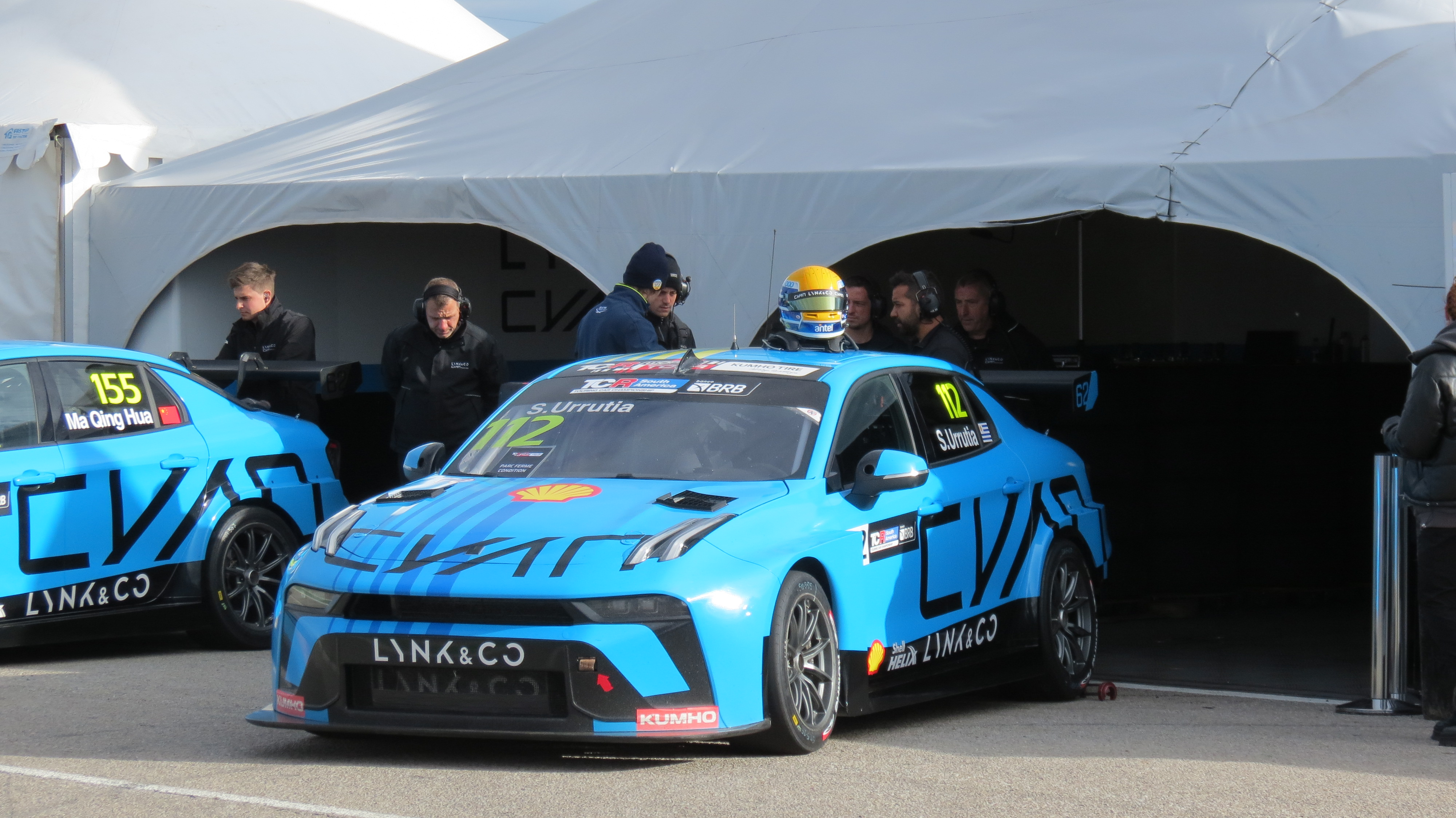
Lynk & Co 03 FL TCR of Cyan Racing in the 2023 TCR World Tour

The Swedish Touring Car Championship was created in 1996, formalising touring car races in the country. Volvo, which had been competing in the BTCC since 1994, partnered with the newly founded, Halmstad-based Flash Engineering racing team, owned by Swedish driver Jan "Flash" Nilsson. Volvo provided financial support and the cars.

In 2005, Nilsson sold the Flash Engineering team to Christian Dahl, and it was renamed Polestar Racing.

Volvo announced in July 2015 that it had purchased Polestar Performance, the production car tuning division of Polestar, as well as the Polestar brand. The Polestar Racing team remained under the direction of Christian Dahl, and was rebranded Cyan Racing.

When the team entered the FIA World Touring Car Championship in 2016, it partnered with former rival team WestCoast Racing in order to continue running cars in the Scandinavian Touring Car Championship.

The company launched the Volvo P1800 Cyan in 2020, a road legal restomod sold in limited numbers.

== Cars ==
Years active	Model	Constructor	Homologation	Engine	Drive-train	Weight
1996–1997	Volvo 850 Super Touring	Tom Walkinshaw Racing	Super Touring	5-cylinder, 2000cc, N/A, 295 hp	FWD, 6-speed sequential	975 kg
1998–2002	Volvo S40 Super Touring	Tom Walkinshaw Racing	Super Touring	5-cylinder, 2000cc, N/A, 317 hp	FWD, 6-speed sequential	975 kg
2003–2007	Volvo S60 S2000	Prodrive/Polestar	S2000	5-cylinder, 2000cc, N/A, 280 hp	FWD, 6-speed sequential	1165 kg
2008–2011	Volvo C30 S2000	Polestar	S2000	5-cylinder, 2000cc, N/A, 290 hp	FWD, 6-speed sequential	1159 kg
2011–2013	Volvo C30 S2000 1.6T	Polestar	S2000 1.6T	4-cylinder, 1600cc, turbocharged, 340 hp	FWD, 6-speed sequential	1164 kg
2012–2016	Volvo S60 STCC	Solution-F/Polestar	TTA	6-cylinder, 3500cc, N/A, 420 hp	RWD, 6-speed sequential	1150 kg
2014–2016	Volvo S60 V8SC	Garry Rogers Motorsport/Polestar	COTF	8-cylinder, 5000cc, N/A, 650 hp	RWD, 6-speed sequential	1400 kg
2016–2017	Volvo S60 Polestar TC1	Cyan Racing	TC1	4-cylinder, 1600cc, turbocharged, 400 hp	FWD, 6-speed sequential	1100 kg
2019–	Lynk & Co 03 TCR	Geely Group Motorsport	TCR	4-cylinder, 2000cc, turbocharged, 350 hp	FWD, 6-speed sequential	1265 kg
2023–	Lynk & Co 03 FL TCR	Geely Group Motorsport	TCR	4-cylinder, 2000cc, turbocharged, 350 hp	FWD, 6-speed sequential	1265 kg
2026-	Geely Preface TCR	Geely Cyan Racing	TCR	4-cylinder, 1969cc, turbocharged, 350 hp	FWD, 6-speed sequential	1265 kg

== Achievements ==
Flash Engineering initially raced a Volvo 850 Super Touring, built by Tom Walkinshaw Racing (TWR). Team owner Jan Nilsson won the STCC in its inaugural season (1996), as well as 1997. In 1998, Flash moved to a S40 Super Touring, also built by TWR. In 2000, the team moved to Karlstad.

Volvo won the Manufacturer's Championship in 2002, with Flash Engineering winning 6 of the series' 18 rounds. Following the introduction of Super 2000 rules in 2003, the team took over technical development of both the engines and the chassis from Volvo. With the new Volvo S60 S2000, originally built by Prodrive and further developed by Flash Engineering, they won the Manufacturer's Championship again in 2003, with Flash Engineering winning 4 of the series' 16 races.

Tommy Rustad won the 2009 STCC drivers championship driving for Polestar Racing, running a Volvo C30 S2000. 2010 saw Polestar winning the STCC teams' championship.

For the 2011 WTCC season, Polestar entered one Volvo C30, developed from scratch by Polestar, driven by Robert Dahlgren.

2012 saw Polestar racing in the new Swedish break-away touring car championship TTA with a Volvo S60 Solution-F. The team claimed all three titles of the 2012 TTA – Racing Elite League season, including teams', manufacturers' and drivers' title with Fredrik Ekblom.

2013 saw TTA and STCC merging back again as one championship, with Polestar entering five cars for the 2013 season. 2013 and 2014 meant continued success as Thed Björk claimed two straight drivers' titles and the team two consecutive teams' titles. The team claimed the drivers' and teams' titles of the 2014 Scandinavian Touring Car Championship with Thed Björk becoming drivers' champion, Fredrik Ekblom finishing third overall and Prince Carl Philip Bernadotte 12th.

As STCC adopted the TCR technical regulations for the 2017 season, Polestar Cyan Racing decided to leave the championship, joining the Swedish GT series with the Volvo S60 Solution-F and switching to a Lotus Evora GT4 for the 2018 season.

2016 saw the team joining the FIA World Touring Car Championship with Volvo Cars and Polestar, using the S60 model, clinching the drivers' and teams' titles in 2017 with Thed Björk as driver. In 2018 the team cooperated with Yvan Muller Racing, running a pair of Hyundai i30 N TCR with drivers Yvan Muller and Thed Björk, claiming the WTCR teams' title.

The team ran four Lynk & Co cars in the 2019 WTCR, claiming the teams' title and Yvan Muller finishing third in the drivers' championship.

The team claimed the drivers' and teams' title in 2020, with Yann Ehrlacher crowned drivers' champion. 2021 saw the team once again claiming both WTCR titles, with Yann Ehrlacher becoming the first-ever driver to defend his WTCR title.

== Environmentally friendly racing ==
Volvo promoted the use of E85 in the STCC, and that series became the first production car championship series in which bioethanol is allowed, and WTCC. Volvo claims that using E85 results in as much as 80% reduction of fossil-fuel based CO_{2} emissions. Though experts predicted that ethanol-based cars would be disadvantaged in terms of performance compared to petrol-fueled cars, Polestar's S60, powered by E85, won both the first and second rounds of the 2007 Swedish Touring Car Championship season.

The racing version of the Volvo C30, which was jointly developed by Polestar and Volvo, represents a reversal of the usual process, whereby manufacturers take race-proven innovations and incorporate them into their production cars. With the C30, Volvo has taken technology from the C30 DRIVe street car, and implemented them to make a more fuel efficient race car.
