= Göteborg City Race =

- Layout of the full circuit (2008–2011)
- Location: Gothenburg, Sweden
- Coordinates: 57°42′48″N 11°57′40″E
- Capacity: 11,000
- Opened: 13 June 2008; 18 years ago
- Closed: 7 June 2014; 12 years ago
- Major events: STCC (2008–2011, 2013–2014); Porsche Carrera Cup Scandinavia (2008–2011, 2013–2014); TTA – Racing Elite League (2012); DTCC (2010)
- Website: http://www.goteborgcityrace.se/main.htm

Full Circuit (2012–2014)
- Length: 1.575 km (0.979 mi)
- Turns: 12
- Race lap record: 0:44.686 ( (Sweden) Fredrik Ekblom, Volvo S60 TTA, 2012, Silhouette)

Full Circuit (2008–2011)
- Length: 1.650 km (1.025 mi)
- Turns: 13
- Race lap record: 0:45.192 ( (Sweden) Robin Rudholm, Porsche 911 (997 II) GT3 Cup, 2011, Carrera Cup)

The Göteborg City Race was a temporary motor racing circuit in Gothenburg, Sweden. The circuit was located in the city centre on part of docklands called Frihamnspiren, which was usually used as a concert venue. The spectator capacity for the venue was 30,000. The venue for the race weekends was known as "Eco Drive Arena", with all cars running on environmentally classed fuel.

== History ==
It was inaugurated during June 2008, hosting one round of the Swedish Touring Car Championship (STCC), along with supporting races. The main event was won by Honda Racing driver Thed Björk. The success of the event with close to 40,000 spectators saw a return. On 11 February 2010, touringcartimes.com reported that Sport & Evenemang had secured four more years of racing on the street circuit.

In 2012, the STCC was replaced by the TTA – Racing Elite League. The merged STCC – Racing Elite League visited Göteborg in 2013 and 2014.

== The circuit ==
Göteborg City Circuit had a total length of 1.575 km (0.979 mi) with the longest straight at approximately 650 m (2,130 ft). The two hairpins at each end of the circuit which were very wide in and out and promising good overtaking possibilities because they were the reminiscents of those at the Hockenheimring.

== Lap records ==
The fastest official race lap records at the Göteborg City Arena are listed as:

Category	Time	Driver	Vehicle	Event
Full Circuit (2012–2014): 1.575 km (0.979 mi)
Silhouette racing car	0:44.686	Fredrik Ekblom	Volvo S60 TTA	2012 1st Göteborg TTA round
Porsche Carrera Cup	0:45.767	Oscar Palm	Porsche 911 (991 I) GT3 Cup	2014 Göteborg Porsche Carrera Cup Scandinavia round
Renault Clio Cup	0:50.804	Richard Hansson	Renault Clio IV RS	2014 Göteborg Renault Clio Cup JTCC round
Full Circuit (2008–2011): 1.650 km (1.025 mi)
Porsche Carrera Cup	0:45.192	Robin Rudholm	Porsche 911 (997 II) GT3 Cup	2011 Göteborg Porsche Carrera Cup Scandinavia round
Super 2000	0:47.020	Thomas Schie	Chevrolet Lacetti	2008 Göteborg STCC round
