= Silhouette racing car =

Type of race car

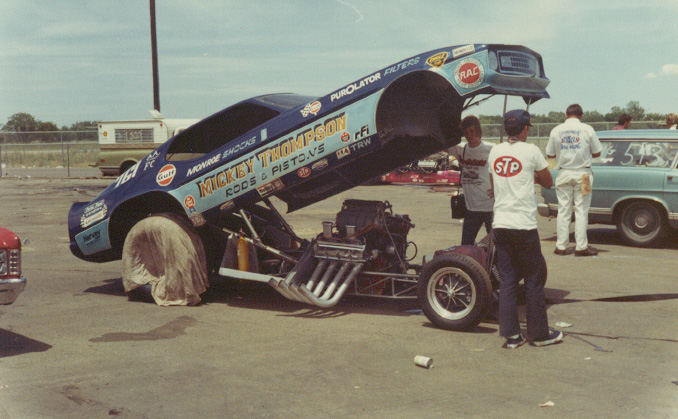
Beneath Mickey Thompson's 1971 Mustang Funny Car body is a racing chassis that shares no commonality with the production vehicle.

A silhouette racing car is a race car which, although bearing a superficial resemblance to a production model, differs mechanically in fundamental ways. The purpose of silhouette cars is to provide a manufacturer with a tangible link to their consumer product offerings so as to derive maximum marketing benefit from their investment in the sport. They also provide spectators with familiar, identifiable car models.

The use of a special-purpose racing car chassis rather than modifying a production car offers a number of potential benefits for a competition, which vary in importance depending on the specific class. They may include:

- Higher performance than is feasible with a production-based chassis.
- Reduced barriers to entering a new make or model in a series (because they are not required to develop a complete car)
- Cheaper and faster crash repairs
- Improved safety

== Construction ==
Silhouette cars often employ radically different chassis construction techniques, such as tubular space frames or carbon-fibre tubs in place of regular monocoques, and many also have completely different drivetrain configurations than their road-going counterparts. The body shells themselves are generally made of lightweight materials such as fibreglass or carbon fibre, and often, few parts (or none at all) are shared between the race and road versions of the cars. These changes are aimed at improving the desirable characteristics of the vehicle, such as increasing the stiffness of the chassis or the output of the engine.

In some silhouette classes, for instance Australian TA2 racing, the underlying chassis is the same for all cars in the series, with multiple body styles resembling different road cars available to fit the chassis.

== Silhouette racing series ==
Entire championship fields can consist of silhouettes. Sometimes, only a single class in a multi-class field may permit silhouettes. Notable racing classes where silhouette cars have been used include Trans-Am, NASCAR, Stock Car Brasil, Group 5, Group B, DTM, JGTC/Super GT, monster trucks and the Australian Supercars Championship.

Due to homologation rules (e.g. Group B rally cars), some silhouette racing cars, such as the Lancia 037 and Lancia Delta S4, also end up being sold as road cars.

== Gallery ==
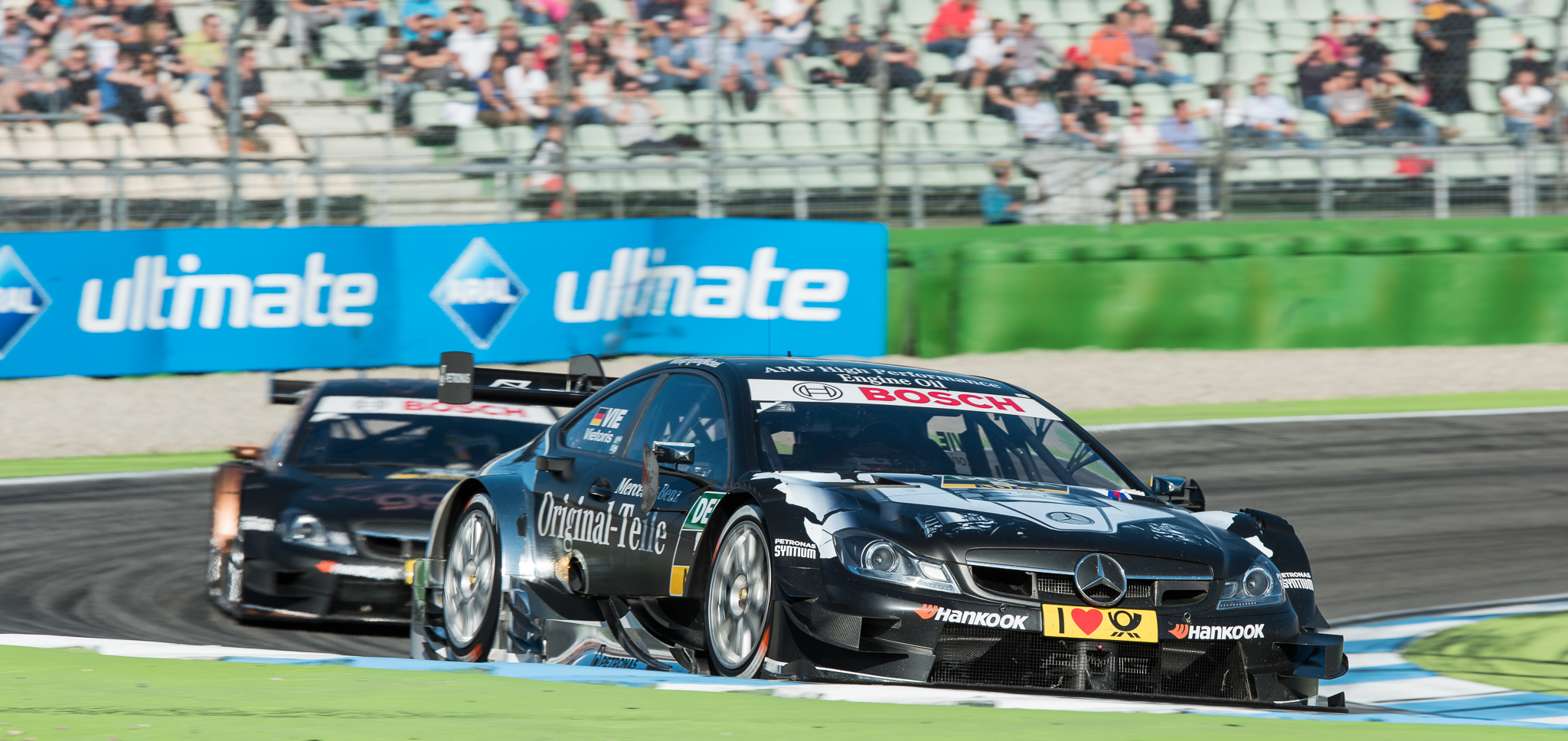
Mercedes-AMG C-Coupé DTM, as seen at Hockenheimring Race II 2014

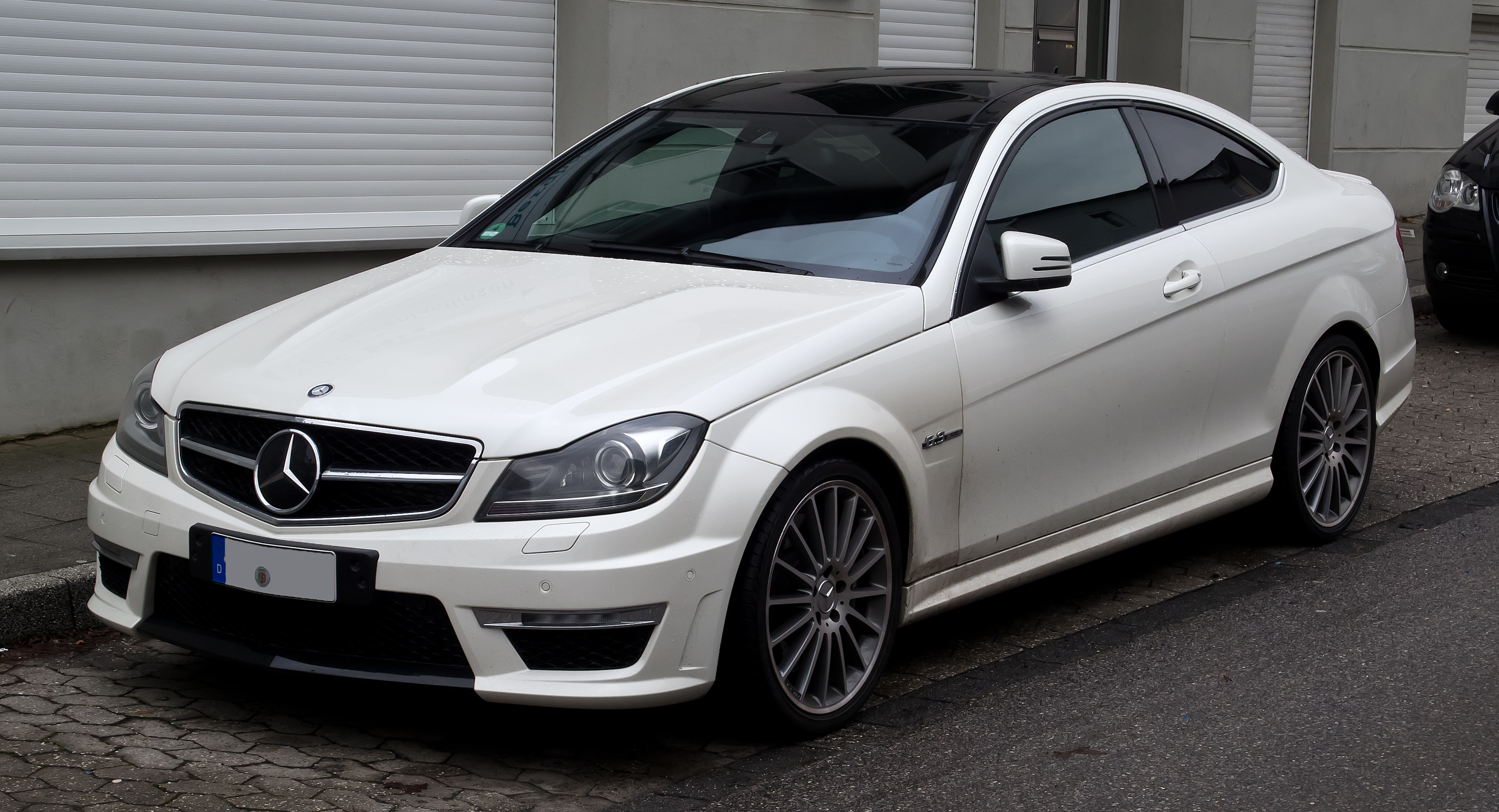
Mercedes-Benz C 63 AMG Coupé, the road car the C-Coupe AMG DTM was based on

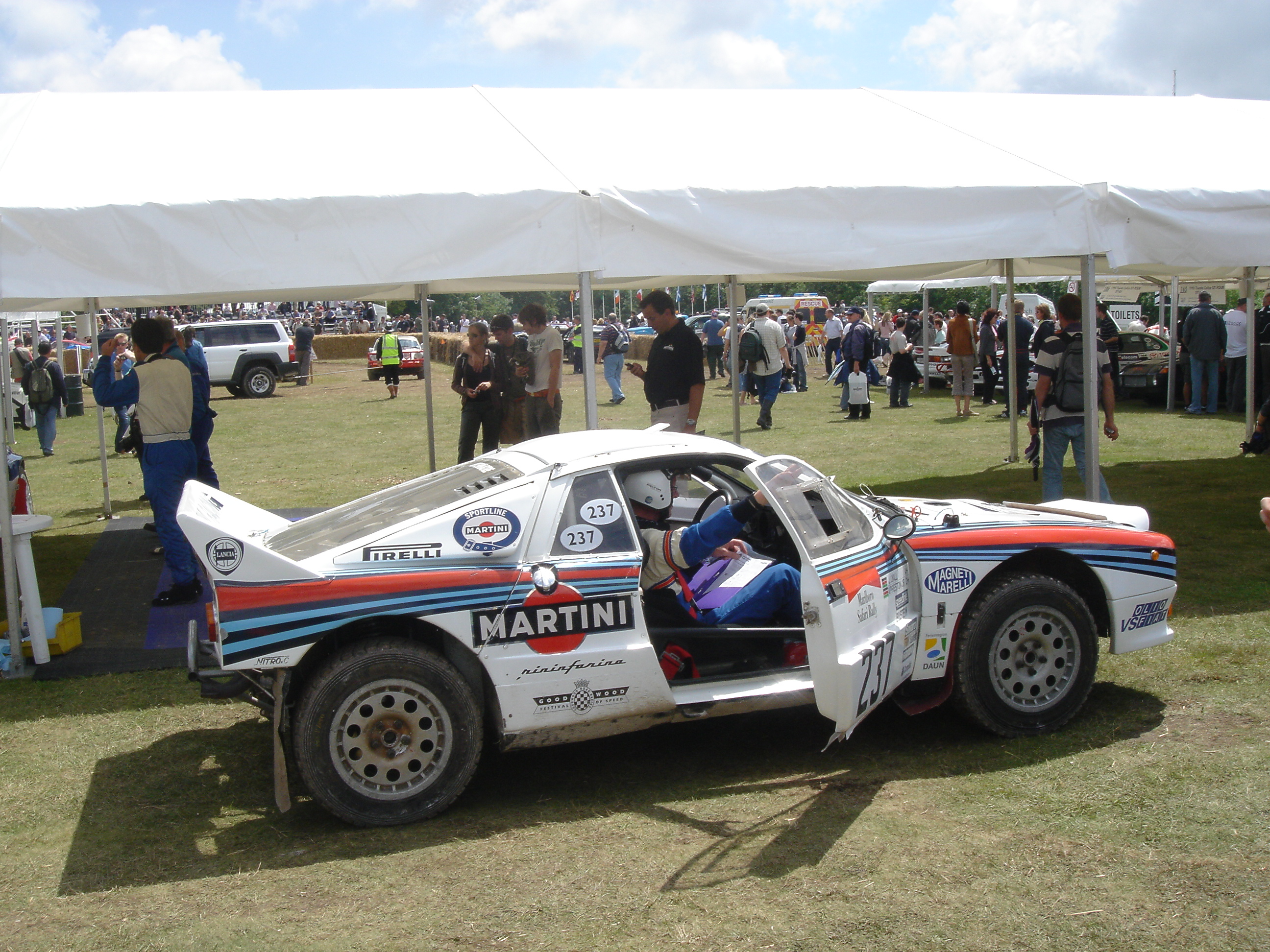
Lancia 037 rally car, based on the road-going Lancia Montecarlo

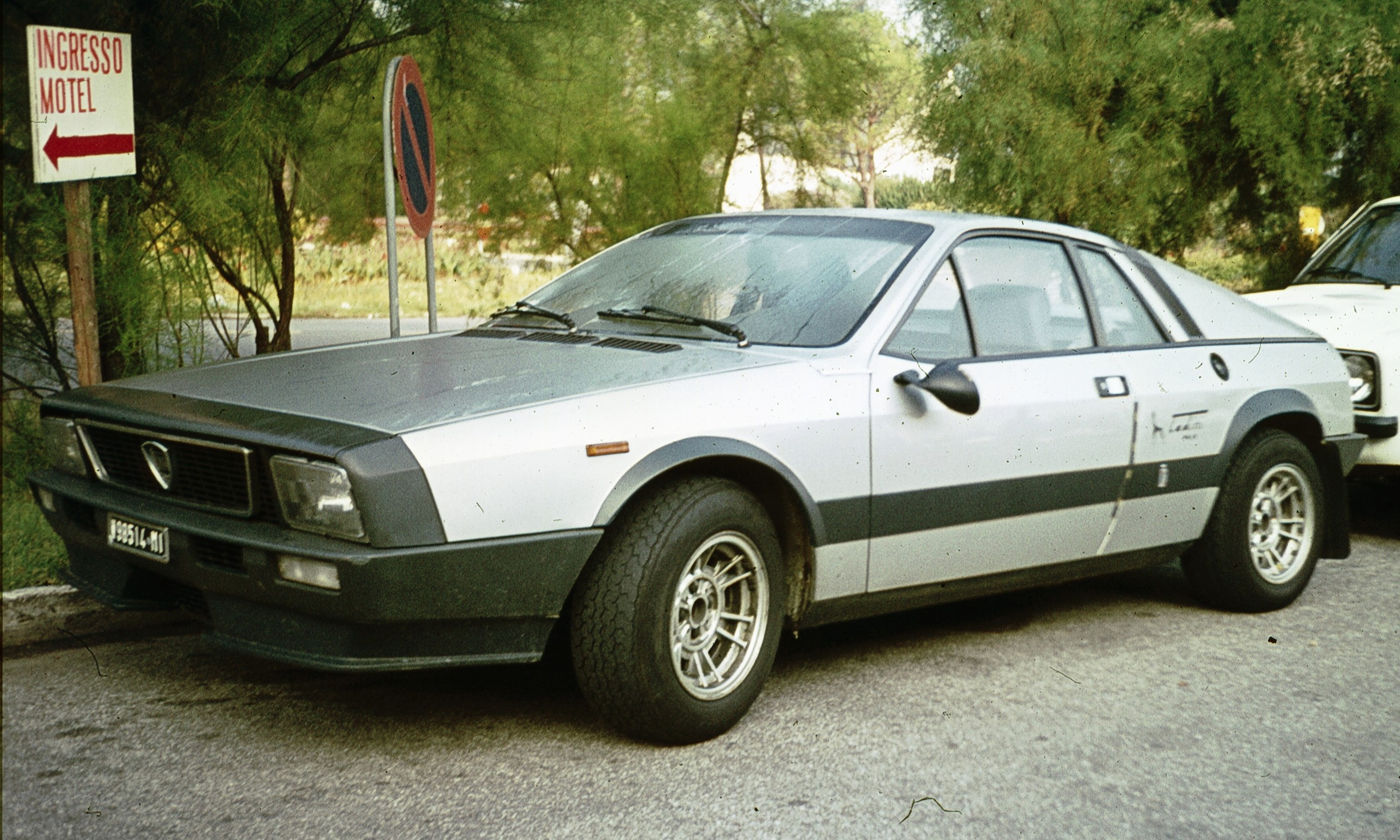
Lancia Montecarlo road car

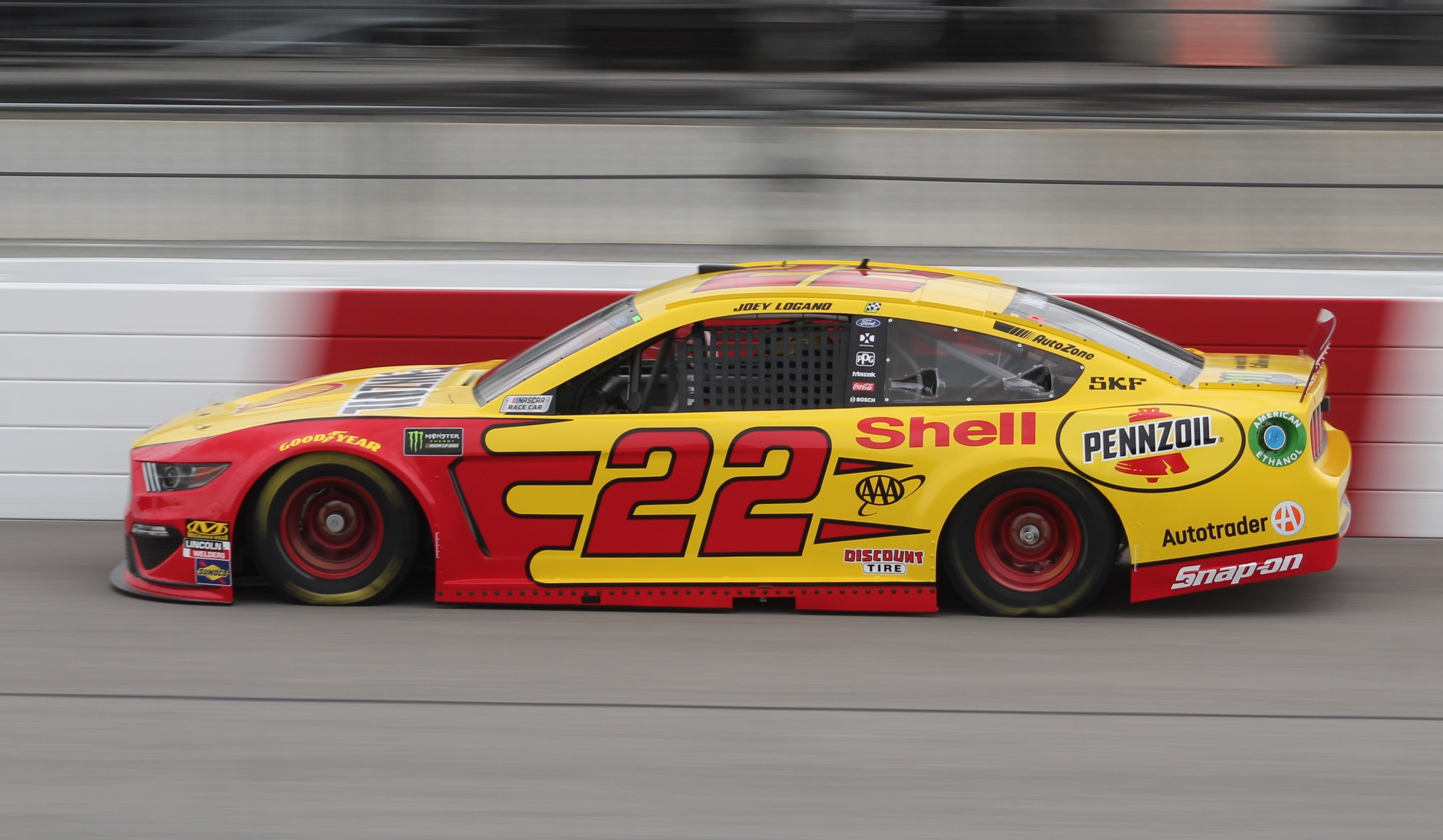
2019 NASCAR Ford Mustang VI

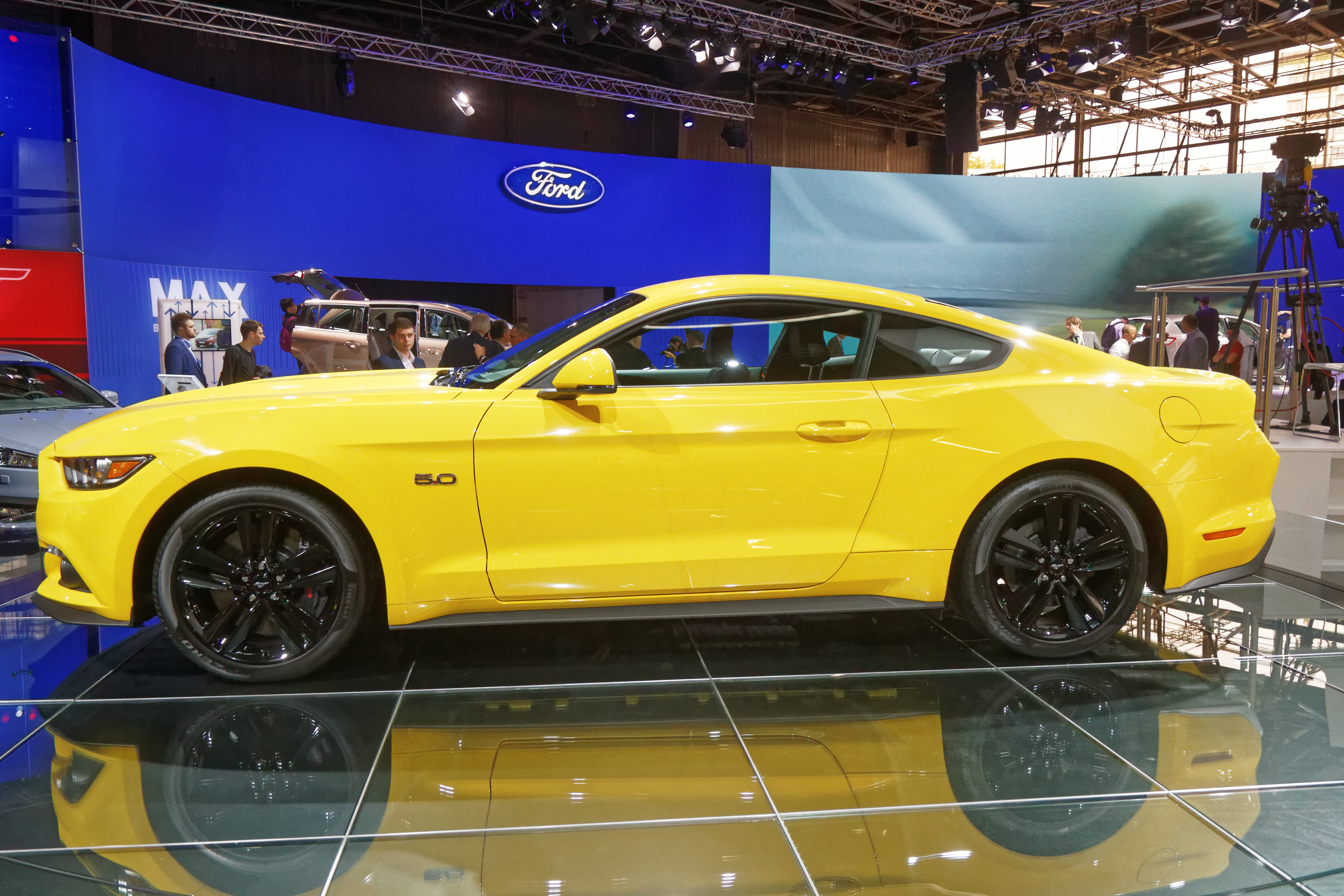
A road-going Ford Mustang VI

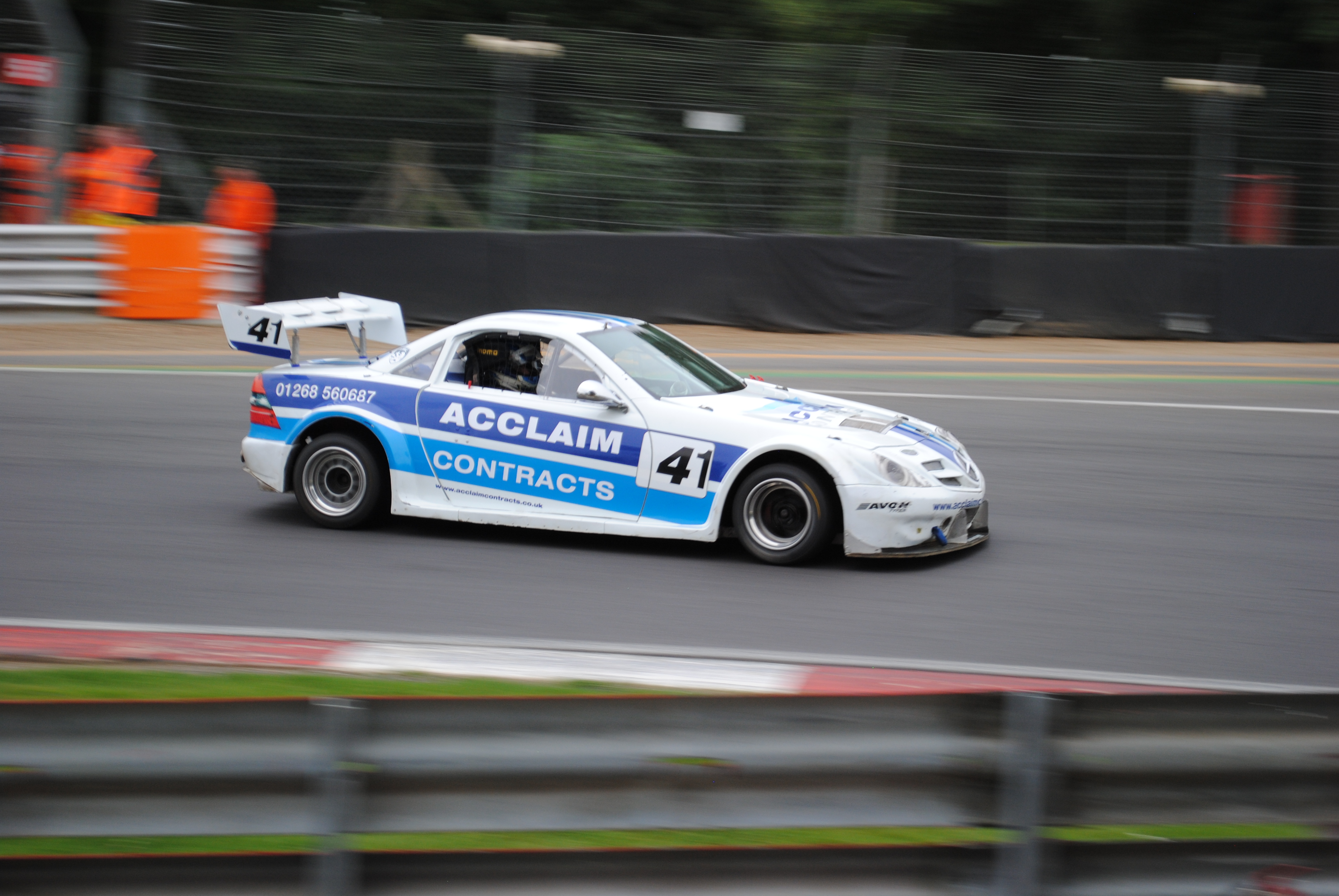
A Mercedes SLK in a saloon car race

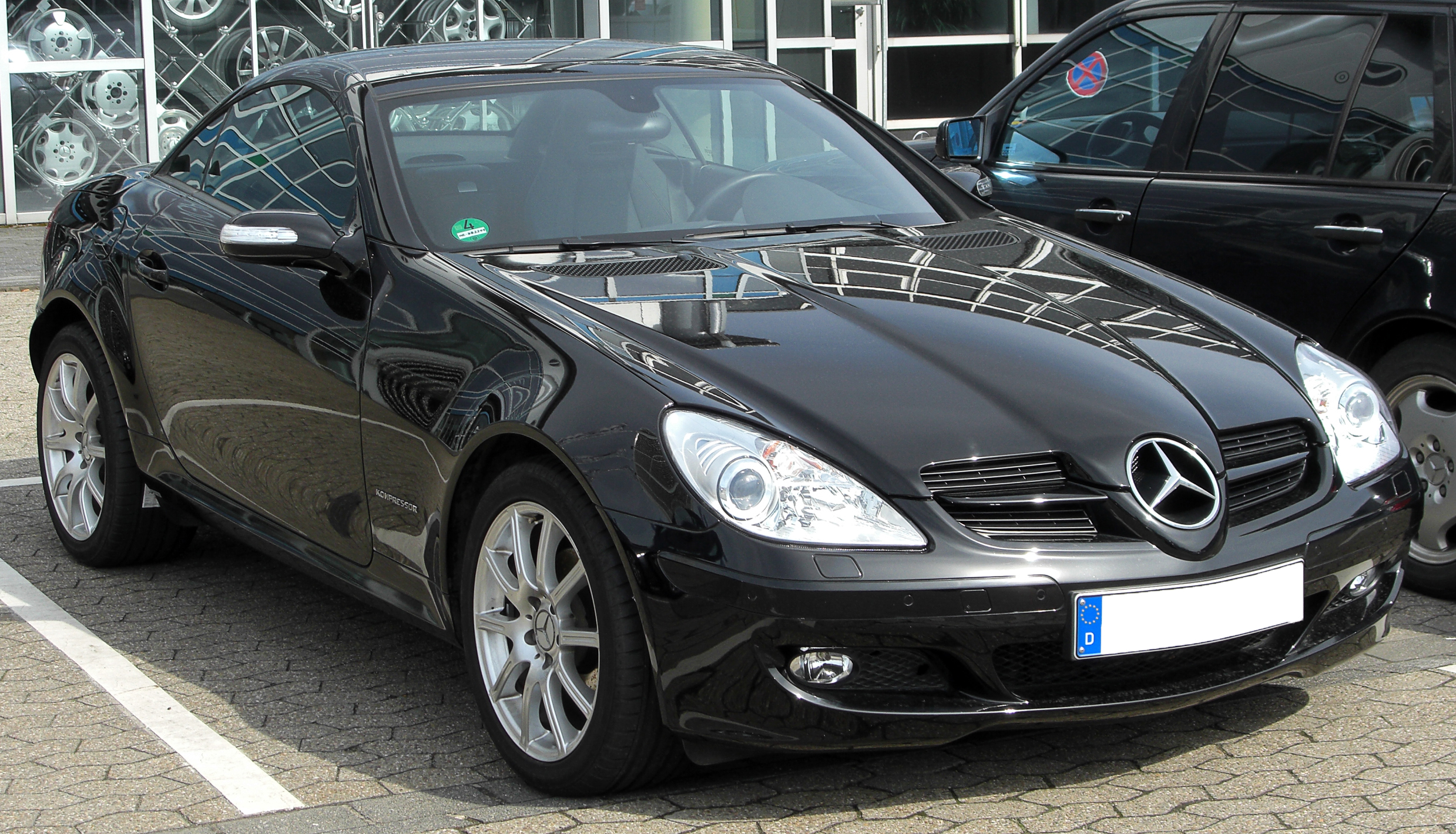
A road-going Mercedes SLK
