= TTA – Racing Elite League =

- Category: Silhouette Touring cars
- Country: Sweden
- Inaugural season: 2012
- Folded: 2013
- Drivers: 18 (16 per race, 2012)
- Teams: 5 (2012)
- Constructors: (France) Solution-F
- Engine suppliers: (Japan) Nismo
- Tyre suppliers: (South Korea) Hankook
- Official website: http://ttagroup.se/

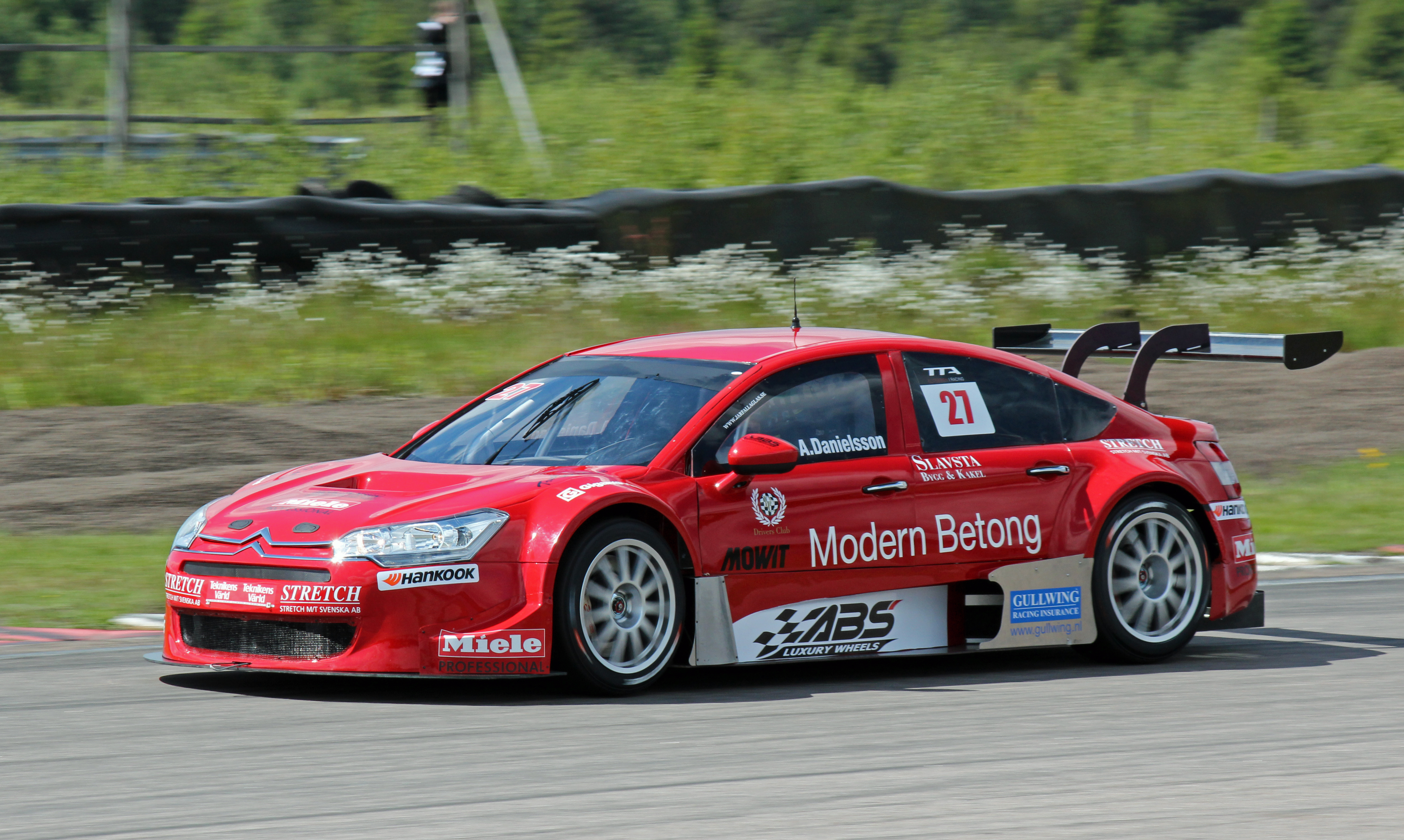
Alx Danielsson at Anderstorp Raceway in 2012.

TTA – Racing Elite League was a Swedish touring car racing series started in 2012, which was founded by four of the biggest teams from the Swedish Touring Car Championship: Polestar Racing, Flash Engineering, WestCoast Racing and Brovallen Design in 2011. TTA worked with the Swedish Automobile Sports Federation and the race car was developed by the French motorsport company Solution-F. The car was a silhouette, where the chassis and powertrain are standardized and custom-built for racing, and where the body is molded from composite material to mimic a normal car.

TTA bought the Swedish Racing League and renamed it to the TTA – Elitserien i Racing (TTA – Racing Elite League). After just one season, the series merged with the STCC in 2013.

== Lone season ==
The first season consisted of an eight-round competition. The racetracks used for the 2012 season was a mix of permanent and temporary racing circuits. The season begun at Karlskoga Motorstadion and will end with Göteborg City Race. The season saw four different models from four different manufacturers: BMW, Citroën, Saab and Volvo.

== TV coverage ==
In Sweden, Viasat were given the broadcast rights to the 2012 season, giving live coverage on its TV10 sports channel.

== Support races ==
- Carrera – GT Cup
- Trofeo Abarth 500 Sweden
- Swedish GT Series
- Swedish Radical Championship
