= 2000 Swedish Touring Car Championship =

Seasons
- ← 1999 2001 →

The 2000 Swedish Touring Car Championship season was the fifth Swedish Touring Car Championship (STCC) season. It was contested over eight rounds (comprising sixteen races) at six different circuits.

Norwegian Tommy Rustad won his first championship for the Crawford Nissan Racing team and became the first non-Swedish driver to win the championship.

== Entry list ==
Team	Car	No.	Drivers	Class	Rounds
Volvo S40 Racing Team Sweden	Volvo S40	1	(Sweden) Mattias Ekström	D	All
Volvo S40 Racing Team Sweden	Volvo S40	5	(Sweden) Jan Nilsson	D	All
Volvo S40 Racing Team Sweden	Volvo S40	34	(United Kingdom) Kelvin Burt	D	8
Kristoffersson Motorsport	Audi A4 Quattro	2	(Sweden) Fredrik Ekblom	D	All
Kristoffersson Motorsport	Audi A4 Quattro	9	(Sweden) Tommy Kristoffersson	D	All
Kristoffersson Motorsport	Audi A4 Quattro	31	(Germany) Christian Abt	D	8
Kristoffersson Motorsport	Audi A4 Quattro	32	(Sweden) Lennart Pehrsson	S	8
Crawford Nissan Racing	Nissan Primera Mk3 GT	3	(Norway) Tommy Rustad	D	All
Crawford Nissan Racing	Nissan Primera Mk3 GT	6	(Sweden) Carl Rosenblad	D	All
Picko Troberg Racing	Ford Mondeo Zetec	4	(Sweden) Jens Edman	D	1, 3–8
Svenska Honda Bilimport	Honda Accord LS	7	(Sweden) Hubert Bergh	D	1–5, 7
Svenska Honda Bilimport	Honda Accord LS	12	(Sweden) Tomas Nyström	D	All
BMW Dealer Team	BMW 320i	11	(Sweden) Peggen Andersson	S	All
NK Motorsport	Alfa Romeo 156 TS	14	(Sweden) Niklas Karlsson	D	8
Euro Racing	Alfa Romeo 156 TS	14	(Sweden) Niklas Karlsson	D	1–4
Euro Racing	Alfa Romeo 156 TS	26	(Sweden) Jocke Mangs	D	8
Euro Racing	Alfa Romeo 156 TS	28	(Sweden) Kari Mäkinen	D	5
Jan Lindblom Racing	Ford Mondeo Ghia	15	(Sweden) Jan Lindblom	S	1–7
Jan Lindblom Racing	Volvo S40	15	(Sweden) Jan Lindblom	S	8
ETAB Data	Audi A4 Quattro	16	(Sweden) Tobias Johansson	S	All
Chrysler Jeep Sweden	Chrysler Stratus	17	(Sweden) Tomas Engström	D	All
Team Polo Motorsport	BMW 320i	18	(Sweden) Djon Clausen	S	1–4, 7–8
Anders Hammer Racing	Honda Accord	19	(Sweden) Anders Hammer	S	2, 4–5, 7–8
Magnus Krokström	Audi A4 Quattro	20	(Sweden) Magnus Krokström	S	All
Georg Bakajev Motorsport	BMW 318is	21	(Sweden) Anders Svensson	S	All
Georg Bakajev Motorsport	BMW 318is	24	(Norway) Jarle Gåsland	S	6, 8
Frank Valle Motorsport	BMW 320i	22	(Norway) Frank Valle	S	2, 4–7
Nordic Radical Motorsport	Opel Vectra GT	23	(Sweden) Rolf Uhr	S	1
Opel Team Sweden	Opel Vectra 16v	25	(Sweden) Pontus Mörth	D	7–8
Tord Linnerud	Opel Vectra 16v	27	(Norway) Tord Linnerud	D	5–6
Torbjörn Sällfors	BMW 320i	29	(Sweden) Torbjörn Sällfors	S	7–8
AGS Motorsport	Audi A4 Quattro	30	(Italy) Roberto Colciago	D	7–8
P.R.O. Motorsport	Nissan Primera Mk3 GT	33	(United Kingdom) David Leslie	D	8
Peter Sundfeldt	Opel Vectra 16v	55	(Sweden) Peter Sundfeldt	D	5, 8

Icon	Class
D	Drivers' Championship
S	Synsam Cup

== Race calendar and winners ==
Round		Circuit	Date	Pole position	Fastest lap	Winning driver	Winning team	Winning privateer
1	R1	(Sweden) Karlskoga-Gelleråsen	7 May	(Norway) Tommy Rustad	(Sweden) Fredrik Ekblom	(Sweden) Fredrik Ekblom	Kristoffersson Motorsport	(Sweden) Magnus Krokström
1	R2	(Sweden) Karlskoga-Gelleråsen	7 May	(Norway) Tommy Rustad	(Sweden) Carl Rosenblad	(Sweden) Fredrik Ekblom	Kristoffersson Motorsport	(Sweden) Tobias Johansson
2	R3	(Sweden) Ring Knutstorp	28 May	(Sweden) Fredrik Ekblom	(Sweden) Fredrik Ekblom	(Sweden) Fredrik Ekblom	Kristoffersson Motorsport	(Sweden) Magnus Krokström
2	R4	(Sweden) Ring Knutstorp	28 May	(Sweden) Fredrik Ekblom	(Sweden) Mattias Ekström	(Sweden) Fredrik Ekblom	Kristoffersson Motorsport	(Sweden) Peggen Andersson
3	R5	(Sweden) Mantorp Park	18 June	(Sweden) Hubert Bergh	(Norway) Tommy Rustad	(Norway) Tommy Rustad	Crawford Nissan Racing	(Sweden) Magnus Krokström
3	R6	(Sweden) Mantorp Park	18 June	(Sweden) Hubert Bergh	(Sweden) Mattias Ekström	(Sweden) Fredrik Ekblom	Kristoffersson Motorsport	(Sweden) Tobias Johansson
4	R7	(Sweden) Falkenberg	9 July	(Sweden) Jan Nilsson	(Sweden) Jan Nilsson	(Sweden) Mattias Ekström	Volvo S40 Racing Team Sweden	(Sweden) Peggen Andersson
4	R8	(Sweden) Falkenberg	9 July	(Norway) Tommy Rustad	(Norway) Tommy Rustad	(Norway) Tommy Rustad	Crawford Nissan Racing	(Sweden) Magnus Krokström
5	R9	(Sweden) Anderstorp	30 July	(Sweden) Carl Rosenblad	(Sweden) Jens Edman	(Sweden) Jens Edman	Picko Troberg Racing	(Sweden) Peggen Andersson
5	R10	(Sweden) Anderstorp	30 July	(Sweden) Carl Rosenblad	(Sweden) Carl Rosenblad	(Sweden) Carl Rosenblad	Crawford Nissan Racing	(Sweden) Magnus Krokström
6	R11	(Norway) Arctic Circle Raceway	13 August	(Sweden) Mattias Ekström	(Norway) Tommy Rustad	(Sweden) Mattias Ekström	Volvo S40 Racing Team Sweden	(Sweden) Magnus Krokström
6	R12	(Norway) Arctic Circle Raceway	13 August	(Sweden) Jan Nilsson	(Sweden) Mattias Ekström	(Sweden) Mattias Ekström	Volvo S40 Racing Team Sweden	(Norway) Frank Valle
7	R13	(Sweden) Karlskoga-Gelleråsen	27 August	(Sweden) Fredrik Ekblom	(Sweden) Fredrik Ekblom	(Sweden) Fredrik Ekblom	Kristoffersson Motorsport	(Sweden) Peggen Andersson
7	R14	(Sweden) Karlskoga-Gelleråsen	27 August	(Sweden) Fredrik Ekblom	(Italy) Roberto Colciago	(Sweden) Fredrik Ekblom	Kristoffersson Motorsport	(Sweden) Peggen Andersson
8	R15	(Sweden) Mantorp Park	10 September	(Norway) Tommy Rustad	(Norway) Tommy Rustad	(Sweden) Jens Edman	Picko Troberg Racing	(Sweden) Peggen Andersson
8	R16	(Sweden) Mantorp Park	10 September	(Norway) Tommy Rustad	(Sweden) Jens Edman	(Sweden) Jens Edman	Picko Troberg Racing	(Sweden) Jan Lindblom

== Drivers' Championship ==
Points system
1st	2nd	3rd	4th	5th	6th	7th	8th	9th	10th	PP
15	12	10	8	6	5	4	3	2	1	1
Double points in final race at Mantorp

Pos.	Driver	KAR (Sweden)		KNU (Sweden)		MAN (Sweden)		FAL (Sweden)		AND (Sweden)		ARC (Norway)		KAR (Sweden)		MAN (Sweden)		Pts
1	(Norway) Tommy Rustad	7	2	5	2	1	4	3	1	3	2	2	2	2	3	20	3	175
2	(Sweden) Fredrik Ekblom	1	1	1	1	2	1	6	3	7	3	5	4	1	1	8	Ret	167
3	(Sweden) Mattias Ekström	2	3	10	9	3	2	1	2	4	6	1	1	4	5	3	2	165
4	(Sweden) Jens Edman	4	8			4	3	Ret	4	1	4	Ret	5	7	11	1	1	115
5	(Sweden) Carl Rosenblad	5	4	DSQ	8	6	6	Ret	DNS	2	1	4	3	3	4	22	9	96
6	(Sweden) Jan Nilsson	DNS	9	2	7	Ret	Ret	2	Ret	5	5	3	Ret	8	8	4	4	84
7	(Sweden) Tomas Nyström	6	6	3	Ret	7	DNS	Ret	Ret	6	7	6	9	Ret	9	2	6	64
8	(Sweden) Tommy Kristoffersson	3	5	4	12	Ret	5	8	5	10	8	8	7	5	Ret	12	7	64
9	(Sweden) Peggen Andersson	11	DNS	8	3	10	Ret	4	Ret	8	13			10	6	6	13	36
10	(Sweden) Tomas Engström	Ret	Ret	7	Ret	Ret	11	5	6	9	10	7	8	9	10	7	10	34
11	(Sweden) Hubert Bergh	Ret	7	9	4	5	9	7	Ret	11	9			DNS	DNS			30
12	(Sweden) Pontus Mörth													6	7	5	5	27
13	(Sweden) Magnus Krokström	9	12	6	5	8	8	10	7	12	11	10	Ret	11	12	17	16	25
14	(Italy) Roberto Colciago													Ret	2	9	Ret	14
15	(Sweden) Tobias Johansson	10	11	13	6	11	7	14	Ret	15	12	11	13	12	13	13	12	10
16	(Sweden) Niklas Karlsson	8	10	14	Ret	9	10	9	Ret							11	Ret	9
17	(Norway) Tord Linnerud									13	Ret	9	6					7
18	(Germany) Christian Abt															Ret	8	6
19	(Sweden) Jan Lindblom	12	13	11	10	Ret	DNS	Ret	8	16	14	Ret	Ret	Ret	DNS	15	11	4
20	(Sweden) Anders Svensson	Ret	DNS	12	13	12	12	11	9	14	19	12	12	DNS	14	DNS	15	2
21	(Norway) Frank Valle			15	Ret			13	10	Ret	16	Ret	10	Ret	DNS			2
22	(United Kingdom) Kelvin Burt															10	Ret	1
23	(Sweden) Djon Clausen	14	14	16	11	Ret	Ret	15	11					14	Ret	19	20	0
24	(Norway) Jarle Gåsland											Ret	11			23	17	0
25	(Sweden) Anders Hammer			DNS	DNS			12	Ret	Ret	15			15	15	16	18	0
26	(Sweden) Rolf Uhr	13	Ret															0
27	(Sweden) Torbjörn Sällfors													13	16	21	21	0
28	(Sweden) Lennart Pehrsson															14	14	0
29	(Sweden) Peter Sundfeldt									17	18					Ret	DNS	0
30	(Sweden) Kari Mäkinen									18	17							0
31	(Sweden) Jocke Mangs															18	19	0
–	(United Kingdom) David Leslie															Ret	Ret	0
Pos.	Driver	KAR (Sweden)		KNU (Sweden)		MAN (Sweden)		FAL (Sweden)		AND (Sweden)		ARC (Norway)		KAR (Sweden)		MAN (Sweden)		Pts

Colour	Result
Gold	Winner
Silver	Second place
Bronze	Third place
Green	Points classification
Blue	Non-points classification
Blue	Non-classified finish (NC)
Purple	Retired, not classified (Ret)
Red	Did not qualify (DNQ)
Red	Did not pre-qualify (DNPQ)
Black	Disqualified (DSQ)
White	Did not start (DNS)
White	Withdrew (WD)
White	Race cancelled (C)
Blank	Did not practice (DNP)
Blank	Did not arrive (DNA)
Blank	Excluded (EX)

=== Synsam Cup for Privateers ===
Pos.	Driver	KAR (Sweden)		KNU (Sweden)		MAN (Sweden)		FAL (Sweden)		AND (Sweden)		ARC (Norway)		KAR (Sweden)		MAN (Sweden)		Pts
1	(Sweden) Magnus Krokström	9	12	6	5	8	8	10	7	12	11	10	Ret	11	12	17	16	196
2	(Sweden) Tobias Johansson	10	11	13	6	11	7	14	Ret	15	12	11	13	12	13	13	12	178
3	(Sweden) Peggen Andersson	11	DNS	8	3	10	Ret	4	Ret	8	13			10	6	6	13	176
4	(Sweden) Anders Svensson	Ret	DNS	12	13	12	12	11	9	14	19	12	12	DNS	14	DNS	15	122
5	(Sweden) Djon Clausen	14	14	16	11	Ret	Ret	15	11					14	Ret	19	20	58
6	(Sweden) Anders Hammer			DNS	DNS			12	Ret	Ret	15			15	15	16	18	41
7	(Norway) Frank Valle			15	Ret			13	10	Ret	16	Ret	10	Ret	DNS			40
8	(Sweden) Lennart Pehrsson															14	14	30
9	(Norway) Jarle Gåsland											Ret	11			23	17	26
10	(Sweden) Jan Lindblom	12	13	11	10	Ret	DNS	Ret	8	16	14	Ret	Ret	Ret	DNS	15	11	26
11	(Sweden) Torbjörn Sällfors													13	16	21	21	21
12	(Sweden) Rolf Uhr	13	Ret															8
Pos.	Driver	KAR (Sweden)		KNU (Sweden)		MAN (Sweden)		FAL (Sweden)		AND (Sweden)		ARC (Norway)		KAR (Sweden)		MAN (Sweden)		Pts
