= David Leslie (racing driver) =

British racing driver (1953–2008)

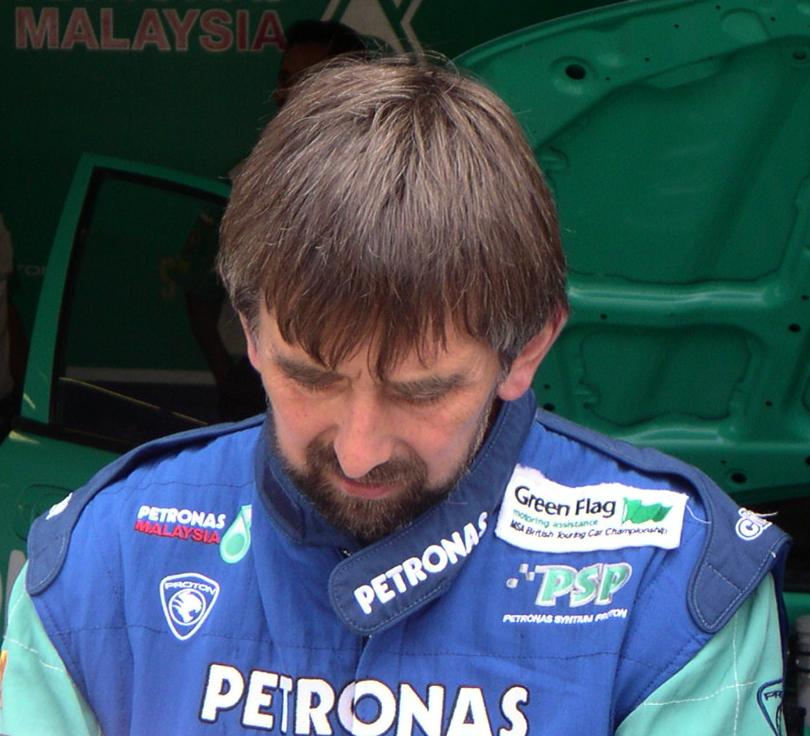
- Leslie in 2003
- Nationality: (United Kingdom) British
- Born: David William Leslie; 9 November 1953 Annan, Dumfries and Galloway, Scotland
- Died: 30 March 2008 (aged 54) Farnborough, Greater London, England

British Touring Car Championship
- Years active: 1987, 1989–2000, 2002–2003
- Teams: John Maguire Racing; Brooklyn Motorsport; Pyramid Motorsport; Auto Trader Techspeed Team; Ecurie Ecosse; Team Mazda; Honda Team MSD; Vodafone Nissan Racing; PRO Motorsport; Petronas Syntium Proton
- Starts: 218
- Wins: 9
- Poles: 16
- Fastest laps: 12
- Best finish: 2nd in 1999

Championship titles
- 1977 1980: BARC Formula Ford 1600; British Formula Atlantic

David William Leslie (9 November 1953 – 30 March 2008) was a British racing driver. He was most associated with the British Touring Car Championship, in which he was runner-up in 1999. He was particularly noted for his development skill, helping both Honda and Nissan become BTCC race winners. He was born in Dumfries, Scotland.

== Career ==
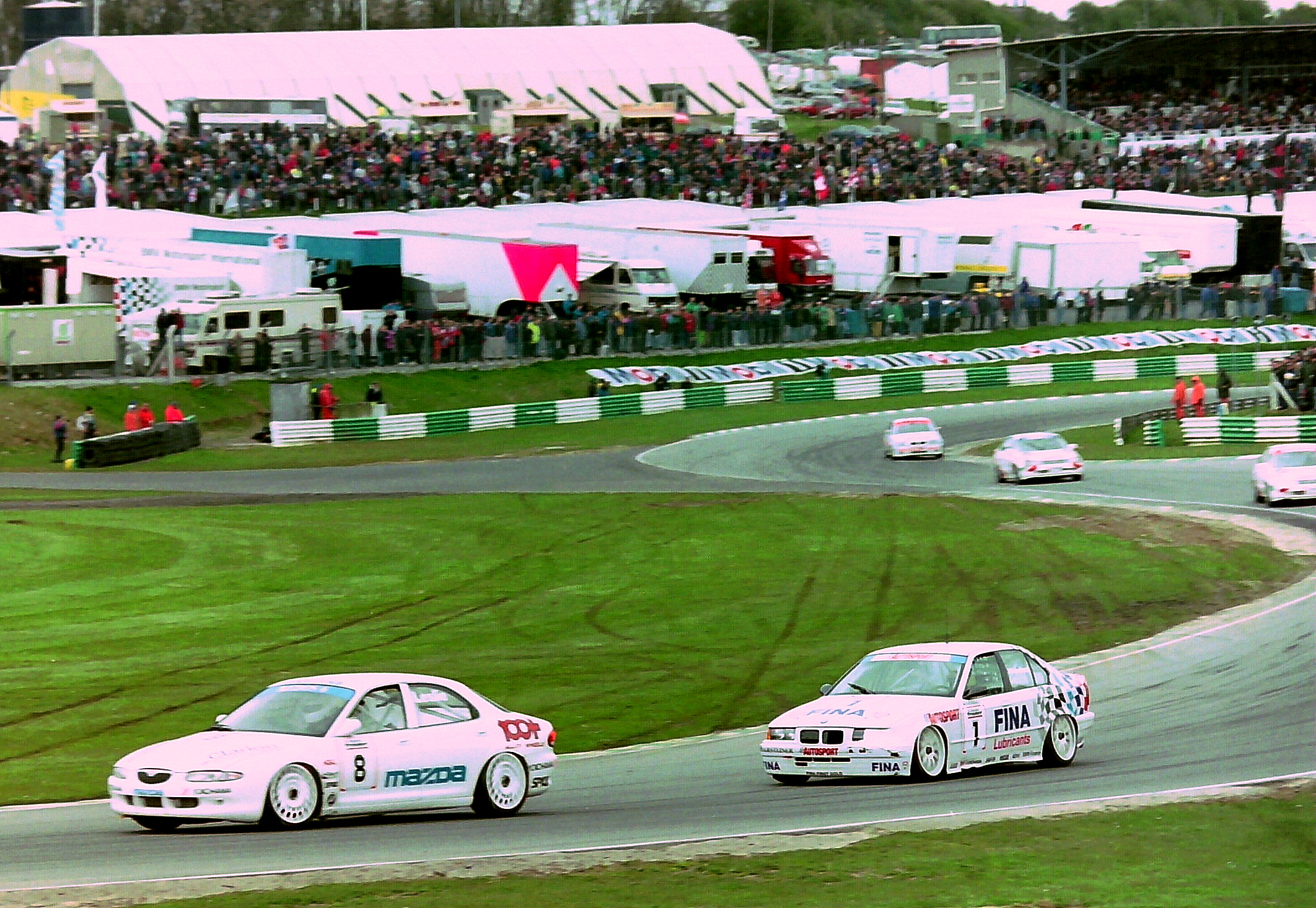
Leslie (Mazda Xedos 6) chased by Joachim Winkelhock (BMW 318i) at Brands Hatch during the 1994 BTCC season.

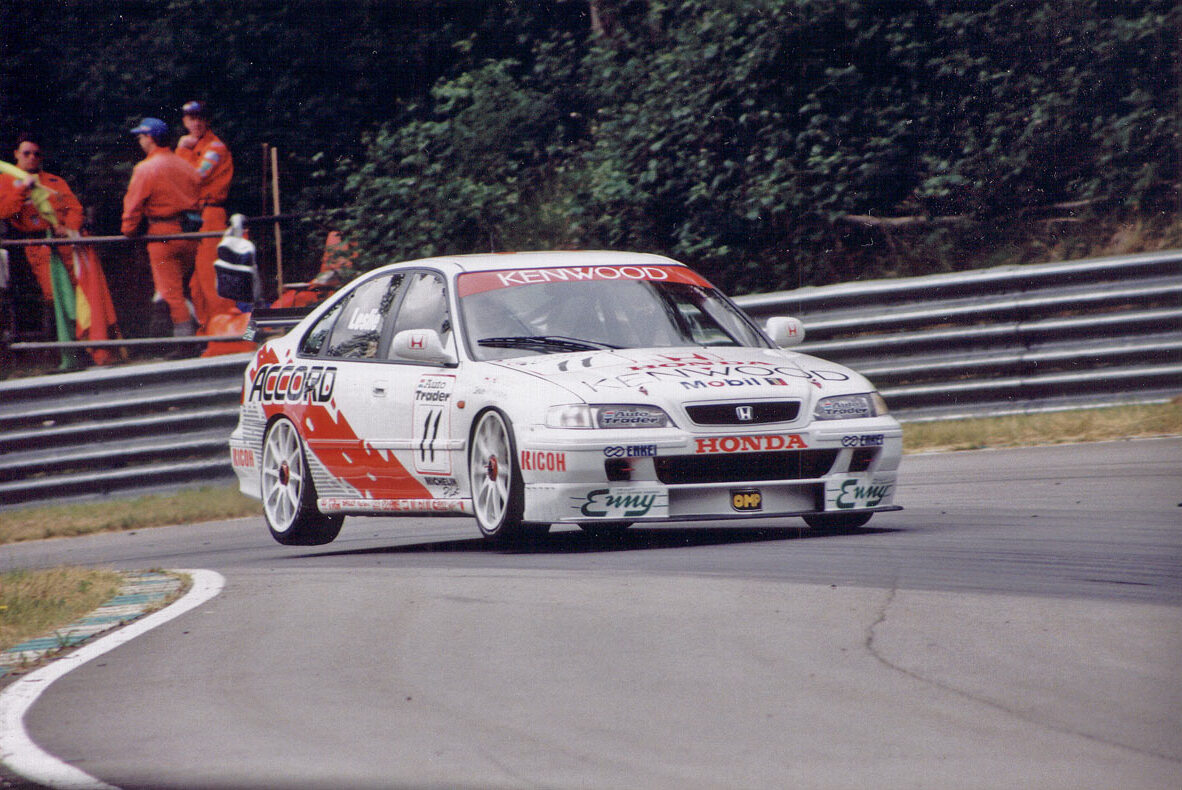
Leslie driving for Honda at Brands Hatch in the 1996 BTCC season.

=== Karting and junior formulas ===
Leslie was a five-time Scottish karting champion before switching to cars, winning the Formula Ford title in 1978. In 1980, he raced a Ralt RT4 in Formula Atlantic for Hope Scott Garage in Currie, Midlothian. He later moved to the British Formula Three Championship from 1981 to 1984, becoming involved with the Ecurie Ecosse team.

=== Sportscar racing ===
With Ecosse, Leslie moved to the World Sportscar Championship, driving to multiple C2 class victories and helping the team earn the 1986 championship. Leslie himself would earn second place in the Drivers Championship in 1987 alongside teammate Ray Mallock. Leslie and the team also finished second in the C2 class and eighth overall in the 1987 24 Hours of Le Mans.

Ecosse eventually took over the Aston Martin sports car program before Leslie departed in 1990 to become part of Tom Walkinshaw's Jaguar team. Leslie competed at the 24 Hours of Le Mans a total of ten times, including driving the works Jaguar XJ220 in 1993 alongside Win Percy and Armin Hahne, only to retire with engine failure while in contention for the lead of the GT class.

=== One-make racing ===
In 1985, Ecosse ran Leslie in the ESSO MG Metro Challenge.

Leslie raced in the Honda CR-X Challenge in 1988 and 1989.

=== Touring car racing and GTs ===
Leslie maintained his links with Ecosse when the team moved to the British Touring Car Championship in 1990. He competed on a partial schedule for the first two seasons before becoming a full-time driver for Vauxhall in 1992. He took his first win a year later, and earned a total of six pole positions over those two years, both of which ended in top-ten championship placements.

1994 was an unsuccessful season in a Mazda, but for 1995, Leslie joined Honda as they entered the series for the first time. The car was late getting onto the track in pre-season, and reliability was initially poor, however he finished tenth overall after a strong end to the season. 1996 started badly with several collisions, but a victory in the British Grand Prix support meeting kick-started a strong second half of the season, allowing him to snatch fourth overall at the final round of the season.

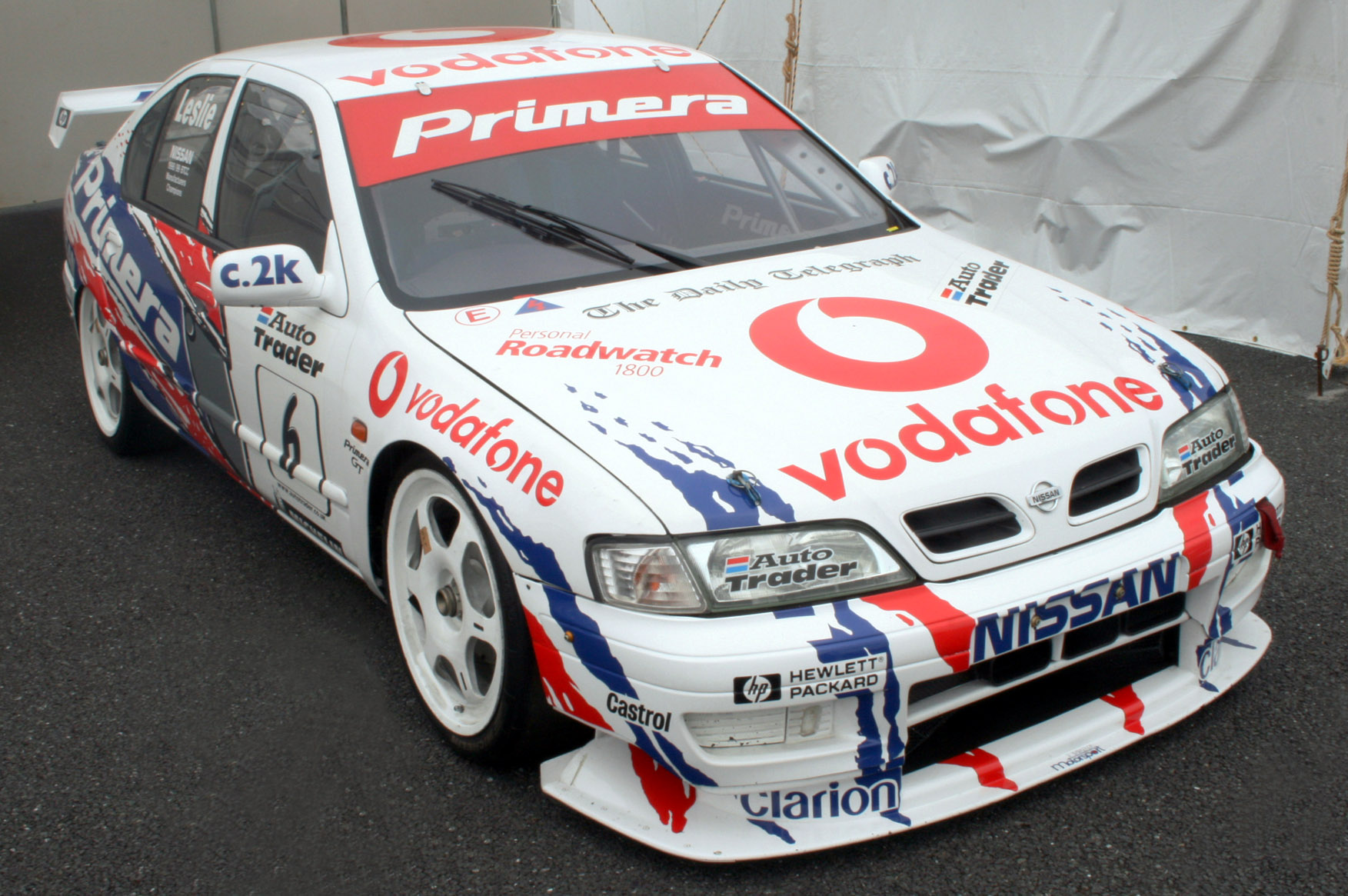
Leslie's Primera in the 1999 BTCC.

For the BTCC in 1997, James Thompson and Gabriele Tarquini raced the Hondas and Leslie switched to Nissan alongside Anthony Reid. Again the car was initially uncompetitive, and much of the credit for its eventual success is widely attributed to Leslie. In 1998, he achieved two victories and five podiums for Nissan, finishing seventh in the standings. He also did a one-off appearance in the British GT Championship that same year at the British Grand Prix supporting race, finishing third in a Porsche 911 GT1 shared with Matt Neal. In 1999, he finished a close runner up in the championship standings to teammate Laurent Aïello, with three race wins and ten podiums.

The company pulled out after that, and Leslie did only occasional races in 2000. Notably, for the works Honda team in one round of the 2000 European Super Touring Cup and one round of the 2000 British Touring Car Championship. He also did two further BTCC rounds that season in the private PRO Motorsport Nissan Primera and competed in the final round of the 2000 Swedish Touring Car Championship. He competed at the Spa 24 Hours that same year, sharing a Honda Accord with James Kaye and Mark Lemmer, but retired with engine failure. He also drove for Marcos in the 2000 British GT Championship for a select number of rounds, finishing on the podium at Croft. He contested the Speedvision Challenge in the US during 2001 in addition to another outing in the British GT Championship (Knockhill), once again in a Marcos and finishing on the class podium.

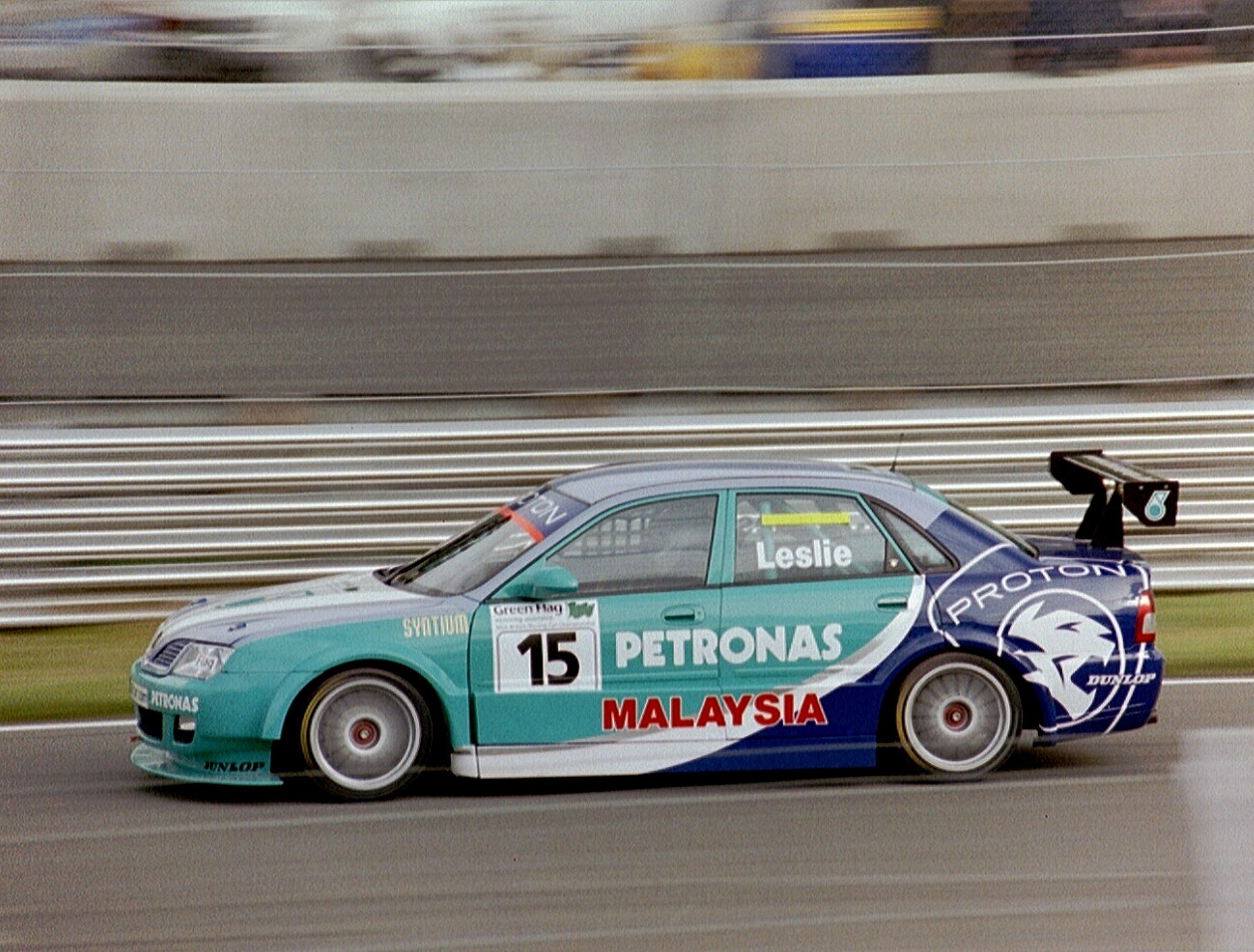
Leslie driving for Proton at Brands Hatch during the 2003 British Touring Car Championship season.

Leslie joined Proton in the BTCC for the 2002 and 2003 seasons, but the project was not a great success. He did, however, manage to secure two third-place results and was the best-placed Proton in both seasons. Thereafter Leslie provided commentary for Eurosport on the World Touring Car Championship series, although he continued to occasionally participate in the Britcar series.

For the past three years, Leslie had been lecturing Motorsports Management, part-time at Swansea Metropolitan University.

Allan McNish credited the start he, David Coulthard, and Dario Franchitti were given at the start of their careers as largely to Leslie and his late father David senior.

== Death ==
Leslie died on 30 March 2008, when the private jet he was travelling in crashed into a housing estate in Farnborough. He was flying with fellow racing driver and team owner Richard Lloyd and data engineer Chris Allarton. They were travelling to the Nogaro Circuit in France to test for Lloyd's Apex Motorsport in preparation for the FIA GT3 European Championship.

The investigation into the crash found that a combination of incorrectly identified, non-critical system failures led to the in-flight shut-down of both engines, with the crew unable to restart them in time to avoid the impact.

== Racing record ==
=== Complete British Formula One Championship results ===
(key) (Races in bold indicate pole position; races in italics indicate fastest lap)

Year	Entrant	Chassis	Engine	1	2	3	4	5	6	7	8	9	10	11	12	13	14	15	Pos.	Pts
1979	Graham Eden Racing	Chevron B41	Ford Cosworth DFV 3.0 V8	ZOL	OUL	BRH	MAL	SNE	THR	ZAN	DON; 14	OUL; 4	NOG	MAL; DNS	BRH; Ret	THR	SNE	SIL	=17th	3

=== Complete British Touring Car Championship results ===
(key) Races in bold indicate pole position (1 point awarded – 1996–2002 all races, 2003 just in first race) Races in italics indicate fastest lap (1 point awarded – 2000–2003 all races) * signifies that driver lead race for at least one lap (1 point awarded – 1998–2002 just for feature race, 2003 all races)

Year	Team	Car	Class	1	2	3	4	5	6	7	8	9	10	11	12	13	14	15	16	17	18	19	20	21	22	23	24	25	26	Overall Pos	Pts	Class Pos
1987	John Maguire Racing	Rover Vitesse	A	SIL	OUL	THR	THR	SIL	SIL	BRH	SNE	DON	OUL; NC‡	DON	SIL															NC	0	NC
1989	Brooklyn Motorsport	Ford Sierra RS500	A	OUL	SIL	THR	DON; DNQ‡	THR	SIL	SIL	BRH	SNE	BRH	BIR	DON	SIL														NC	0	NC
1990	Pyramid Motorsport	BMW M3	B	OUL	DON ovr:7‡ cls:2‡	THR	SIL	OUL	SIL	BRH ovr:6/NC‡ cls:3/NC‡	SNE	BRH	BIR	DON	THR ovr:15 cls:10	SIL														38th	1	26th
1991	Auto Trader Techspeed Team	BMW M3		SIL	SNE	DON	THR	SIL	BRH	SIL; 9	DON; 1	DON; 2	OUL	BRH; 1	BRH; 2	DON	THR													16th	12	
1991	Pyramid Motorsport	BMW M3																SIL; 4												16th	12	
1992	Ecurie Ecosse Vauxhall	Vauxhall Cavalier		SIL; 7	THR; 7	OUL; 5	SNE; 5	BRH; 5	DON; 1; 6	DON; 2; 5	SIL; 7	**KNO**; **1** Ret	KNO; 2 DNS	PEM; 7	BRH; 1; 6	BRH; 2; 6	**DON**; 10	SIL; 3												7th	66	
1993	Ecurie Ecosse Vauxhall	Vauxhall Cavalier		SIL; Ret	DON; Ret	SNE; 3	DON; 8	OUL; Ret	**BRH**; **1**; 18	BRH; 2; 6	**PEM**; Ret	SIL; 5	KNO; 1; 9	KNO; 2; 7	OUL; 7	**BRH**; 13	**THR**; 1	DON; 1; 4	DON; 2; 8	SIL; 4										8th	72	
1994	Team Mazda	Mazda Xedos 6		THR; 8	BRH; 1; 8	BRH; 2; 11	SNE; 17	SIL; 1; 16	SIL; 2; 11	OUL; Ret	DON; 1 Ret	DON; 2 DNS	BRH; 1 Ret	BRH; 2; 19	SIL; 11	KNO; 1	KNO; 2	OUL	BRH; 1	BRH; 2	SIL; 1	SIL; 2	DON; 1	DON; 2						20th	6	
1995	Honda Team MSD	Honda Accord		DON; 1 Ret	DON; 2 Ret	BRH; 1; 17	BRH; 2; 17	THR; 1; 8	THR; 2; 12	SIL; 1; 9	SIL; 2; 8	OUL; 1 DNS	OUL; 2 DNS	BRH; 1; 12	BRH; 2; 18	DON; 1; 7	DON; 2; 9	SIL; 12	KNO; 1; 11	KNO; 2; 7	BRH; 1; 17	BRH; 2; 10	SNE; 1; 8	SNE; 2; 8	OUL; 1; 6	OUL; 2; 3	SIL; 1; 5	SIL; 2; 4		11th	61	
1996	Honda Team MSD	Honda Accord		DON; 1 Ret	DON; 2 Ret	BRH; 1; 10	BRH; 2 Ret	THR; 1; 8	THR; 2; 5	SIL; 1; 3	SIL; 2; 9	OUL; 1; 8	OUL; 2; 7	SNE; 1; 9	SNE; 2 Ret	BRH; 1; 5	BRH; 2; 7	**SIL**; **1**; 4	**SIL**; **2**; 1	KNO; 1; 6	KNO; 2; 7	**OUL**; **1**; 3	OUL; 2; 2	THR; 1; 1	THR; 2; 8	DON; 1; 2	DON; 2; 1	BRH; 1; 3	BRH; 2; 5	4th	159	
1997	Vodafone Nissan Racing	Nissan Primera GT		DON; 1; 4	DON; 2; 11	SIL; 1; 3	SIL; 2 Ret	THR; 1; 7	THR; 2; 11	BRH; 1; 4	BRH; 2; 3	OUL; 1; 10	OUL; 2; 6	DON; 1; 9	DON; 2 Ret	CRO; 1 Ret	CRO; 2; 3	KNO; 1; 11	KNO; 2 Ret	SNE; 1; 9	SNE; 2; 6	THR; 1; 8	THR; 2; 10	BRH; 1; 6	BRH; 2; 8	SIL; 1; 6	SIL; 2; 6			8th	87	
1998	Vodafone Nissan Racing	Nissan Primera GT		THR; 1; 7	THR; 2; 12	SIL; 1; 1	SIL; 2 Ret	DON; 1 Ret	**DON**; **2**; 1*	BRH; 1 Ret	BRH; 2; 6	OUL; 1; 3	OUL; 2 Ret	DON; 1 Ret	DON; 2; 2*	CRO; 1 Ret	**CRO**; **2**; 2*	SNE; 1; 6	SNE; 2; 4	THR; 1; 5	THR; 2; 2*	KNO; 1; 5	KNO; 2; 9	BRH; 1; 4	BRH; 2 Ret	OUL; 1; 4	OUL; 2 Ret	SIL; 1; 13	**SIL**; **2**; 2*	6th	148	
1999	Vodafone Nissan Racing	Nissan Primera GT		DON; 1; 4	DON; 2 Ret	**SIL**; **1**; 2	SIL; 2; 7	THR; 1; 11	THR; 2 Ret	BRH; 1; 6	BRH; 2; 2	OUL; 1; 2	OUL; 2; 8*	DON; 1; 2	**DON**; **2**; 1*	CRO; 1; 2	CRO; 2; 4	SNE; 1; 1	SNE; 2; 2*	THR; 1; 4	THR; 2; 1*	KNO; 1; 9	KNO; 2; 3	BRH; 1; 4	BRH; 2; 2*	**OUL**; **1**; 2	**OUL**; **2**; 4*	SIL; 1; 11	SIL; 2; 2*	**2nd**	**228**	
2000	Redstone Team Honda	Honda Accord	S	BRH; 1	BRH; 2	DON; 1	DON; 2	THR; 1 ovr:6 cls:6	THR; 2 Ret	KNO; 1	KNO; 2	OUL; 1	OUL; 2	SIL; 1	SIL; 2	CRO; 1	CRO; 2	SNE; 1	SNE; 2											12th	15	
2000	PRO Motorsport	Nissan Primera GT '00	S																	DON; 1 ovr:7 cls:7	DON; 2 ovr:10 cls:10	BRH; 1	BRH; 2	OUL; 1	OUL; 2	SIL; 1 ovr:6 cls:6	SIL; 2 Ret			12th	15	
2002	Petronas Syntium Proton	Proton Impian	T	BRH; 1 Ret	BRH; 2 Ret	OUL; 1 ovr:8 cls:8	OUL; 2 ovr:3 cls:3	THR; 1 ovr:9 cls:9	THR; 2 ovr:9 cls:9	SIL; 1 ovr:3 cls:3	SIL; 2 ovr:9 cls:9	MON; 1 ovr:3 cls:3	MON; 2 ovr:11 cls:11	CRO; 1 ovr:2 cls:2	CRO; 2 ovr:7 cls:7	SNE; 1 ovr:5 cls:5	SNE; 2 Ret	KNO; 1 ovr:9 cls:9	KNO; 2 ovr:8* cls:8	BRH; 1 ovr:9 cls:9	BRH; 2 Ret	DON; 1 ovr:6 cls:6	DON; 2 ovr:6 cls:6							7th	79	
2003	Petronas Syntium Proton	Proton Impian	T	MON; 1 ovr:5 cls:5	MON; 2 ovr:9 cls:9	BRH; 1 ovr:9 cls:9	BRH; 2 ovr:6 cls:6	THR; 1 ovr:17 cls:13	THR; 2 ovr:8 cls:8	SIL; 1 Ret	SIL; 2 ovr:10 cls:10	ROC; 1 ovr:11 cls:11	ROC; 2 Ret	CRO; 1 ovr:9 cls:9	CRO; 2 ovr:19 cls:14	SNE; 1 Ret	SNE; 2 ovr:9 cls:9	BRH; 1 ovr:9 cls:9	BRH; 2 ovr:8 cls:8	DON; 1 Ret	DON; 2 Ret	OUL; 1 Ret	OUL; 2 DNS							11th	28	

‡ Endurance driver (Ineligible for points in 1990)

=== Complete Swedish Touring Car Championship results ===
(key) (Races in bold indicate pole position) (Races in italics indicate fastest lap)

Year	Team	Car	1	2	3	4	5	6	7	8	9	10	11	12	13	14	15	16	DC	Pts
2000	PRO Motorsport	Nissan Primera GT	KAR; 1	KAR; 2	KNU; 1	KNU; 2	MAN; 1	MAN; 2	FAL; 1	FAL; 2	AND; 1	AND; 2	ARC; 1	ARC; 2	KAR; 1	KAR; 2	MAN; 1 Ret	MAN; 2 Ret	NC	0

=== Complete European Touring Car Championship results ===
(key) (Races in bold indicate pole position) (Races in italics indicate fastest lap)

Year	Team	Car	1	2	3	4	5	6	7	8	9	10	11	12	13	14	15	16	17	18	19	20	DC	Pts
2000	(Italy) JAS Engineering	Honda Accord	MUG; 1	MUG; 2	PER; 1	PER; 2	A1R; 1	A1R; 2	MNZ; 1	MNZ; 2	HUN; 1	HUN; 2	IMO; 1	IMO; 2	MIS; 1	MIS; 2	BRN; 1	BRN; 2	VAL; 1	VAL; 2	MOB; 1; 10	MOB; 2; 5	18th	9

=== 24 Hours of Le Mans results ===
Year	Team	Co-Drivers	Car	Class	Laps	Pos.	Class Pos.
1984	(United Kingdom) Ecurie Ecosse	(United Kingdom) David Duffield (United Kingdom) Mike Wilds	Ecosse C284-Ford Cosworth	C2	36	DNF	DNF
1985	(United Kingdom) Ecurie Ecosse	(United Kingdom) Ray Mallock (United Kingdom) Mike Wilds	Ecosse C285-Ford Cosworth	C2	45	DNF	DNF
1986	(United Kingdom) Ecurie Ecosse	(United Kingdom) Ray Mallock (United Kingdom) Mike Wilds	Ecosse C286-Austin-Rover	C2	181	DSQ	DSQ
1987	(United Kingdom) Ecurie Ecosse	(Belgium) Marc Duez (United Kingdom) Ray Mallock	Ecosse C286-Ford Cosworth	C2	308	8th	**2nd**
1988	(Japan) Mazdaspeed Co. Ltd.	(Belgium) Marc Duez (Japan) Yoshimi Katayama	Mazda 767	GTP	330	17th	**2nd**
1989	(United Kingdom) Aston Martin (United Kingdom) Ecurie Ecosse	(United Kingdom) Ray Mallock (United Kingdom) David Sears	Aston Martin AMR1	C1	153	DNF	DNF
1990	(United Kingdom) Silk Cut Jaguar (United Kingdom) Tom Walkinshaw Racing	(United Kingdom) Martin Brundle (France) Alain Ferté	Jaguar XJR-12	C1	220	DNF	DNF
1991	(United Kingdom) TWR Suntec Jaguar	(United States) Jeff Krosnoff (Italy) Mauro Martini	Jaguar XJR-12	C2	183	DNF	DNF
1993	(United Kingdom) TWR Jaguar Racing	(Germany) Armin Hahne (United Kingdom) Win Percy	Jaguar XJ220	GT	6	DNF	DNF
1995	(United Kingdom) Team Marcos	(United Kingdom) Chris Marsh (France) François Migault	Marcos LM600	LMGT2	184	NC	NC

=== 24 Hours of Spa results ===
Year	Team	Co-Drivers	Car	Class	Laps	Pos.	Class Pos.
1993	(United Kingdom) Ecurie Ecosse Vauxhall	(Belgium) Philippe Adams (Belgium) Bernard de Dryver	Vauxhall Cavalier GSi	Pro 2L	101/engine	DNF	DNF
1998	(Belgium) Belgacom Nissan T.U.R.B.O Team	(Belgium) Dirk Schoysman (Belgium) Grégoire de Mévius	Nissan Primera	SP	471	7th	7th
2000	(United Kingdom) ELR & Barwell Motorsport	(United Kingdom) James Kaye (United Kingdom) Mark Lemmer	Honda Accord	SP	?/engine	DNF	DNF

=== Complete British GT Championship results ===
(key) (Races in bold indicate pole position) (Races in italics indicate fastest lap)

Year	Team	Car	Class	1	2	3	4	5	6	7	8	9	10	11	12	Pos	Points
2000	NCK Motorsport	Marcos LM600	GT	THR; 1	CRO; 1; 3	OUL; 1; 2	DON; 1; 7	SIL; 1 Ret	BRH; 1 Ret	DON; 1; 7	CRO; 1	SIL; 1	SNE; 1; 8	SPA; 1	SIL; 1	14th	39

=== Britcar 24 Hour results ===
Year	Team	Co-Drivers	Car	Car No.	Class	Laps	Pos.	Class Pos.
2007	(United Kingdom) GTS Motorsport	(United Kingdom) Joe Macari (United Kingdom) Rob Wilson (United Kingdom) Stuart Wright	BMW M3 E46 GTR	26	GTC	553	6th	**3rd**
