= Per-Gunnar Andersson =

Per-Gunnar Andersson may refer to:

- Per-Gunnar Andersson (rally driver) (born 1980), Swedish rally driver and the Junior World Rally Champion in 2004 and 2007
- Per-Gunnar Andersson (racing driver) (born 1957), Swedish multiple touring car champion
