= 1999 Swedish Touring Car Championship =

Seasons
- ← 1998 2000 →

The 1999 Swedish Touring Car Championship season was the 4th Swedish Touring Car Championship (STCC) season. It was decided over eight race weekends (comprising sixteen races) at six different circuits.

Mattias Ekström won his first championship for Kristofferson Motorsport.

== Entry list ==
Team	Car	No.	Drivers	Class	Rounds
BMW Dealer Team	BMW 320i	1	(Sweden) Fredrik Ekblom	D	All
BMW Dealer Team	BMW 320i	28	(Sweden) Peggen Andersson	S	All
BMW Dealer Team	BMW 320i	30	(Sweden) Niklas Danielsson	S	1–6, 8
Volvo S40 Racing Team Sweden	Volvo S40	2	(Sweden) Jan Nilsson	D	1–3, 5–8
Volvo S40 Racing Team Sweden	Volvo S40	9	(Sweden) Jens Edman	D	All
Picko Troberg Racing	Alfa Romeo 156 TS	5	(Sweden) Mats Lindén	D	6
Picko Troberg Racing	Alfa Romeo 156 TS	15	(Norway) Thomas Schie	D	1–5, 7–8
Opel Motorsport	Opel Vectra 16v	6	(Sweden) Jan Brunstedt	D	All
Elgh Motorsport	Nissan Primera GT	10	(Sweden) Carl Rosenblad	D	All
Elgh Motorsport	Nissan Primera GT	11	(Norway) Tommy Rustad	D	All
Mobil 1 Ford Racing	Ford Mondeo Ghia	12	(Sweden) Thomas Johansson	D	All
Svenska Honda Bilimport	Honda Accord	13	(Sweden) Hubert Bergh	D	All
Svenska Honda Bilimport	Honda Accord	16	(Sweden) Stefan Lindberg	D	1–6, 8
Chrysler Racing Team Sweden	Chrysler Stratus	17	(Sweden) Tomas Engström	D	All
Ross Racing	Peugeot 406	18	(Sweden) Nettan Lindgren-Jansson	D	1–6, 8
Kristoffersson Motorsport	Audi A4 Quattro	20	(Sweden) Tommy Kristoffersson	D	All
Kristoffersson Motorsport	Audi A4 Quattro	21	(Sweden) Mattias Ekström	D	All
Neste Oil AB	Nissan Primera GT	22	(Sweden) Pontus Mörth	S	2–6
Euro Racing	Alfa Romeo 155 TS	23	(Sweden) Niklas Karlsson	S	1–6, 8
Bakajev Motorsport	BMW 320is	24	(Sweden) Georg Bakajev	S	1–6, 8
Frank Valle Motorsport	BMW 320is	25	(Norway) Frank Valle	S	1, 6–8
Nordic Miltronic Motorsport	Opel Vectra 16v	26	(Sweden) Rolf Uhr	S	1–6, 8
Anders Svensson	BMW 320i	27	(Sweden) Anders Svensson	S	All
Tord Linnerud	Opel Vectra 16v	29	(Norway) Tord Linnerud	S	All
Bohlin Motorsport	Nissan Primera GT	31	(Sweden) Jimmy Bohlin	S	1–6, 8
Peter Hallén	BMW 318is	32	(Sweden) Peter Hallén	S	1–4, 6
Kim Esbjug	BMW 320i	33	(Norway) Kim Esbjug	S	All
Börje Gustafsson	Opel Vectra GT	34	(Sweden) Börje Gustafsson	S	1
Brovallen Motorsport	Audi A4 Quattro	35	(Sweden) Tobias Johansson	S	1–6, 8
Torbjörn Holmstedt	Nissan Primera GT	38	(Sweden) Torbjörn Holmstedt	S	1, 4, 6–8
Tomas Nyström	Nissan Primera GT	39	(Sweden) Tomas Nyström	S	1–5, 7–8

Icon	Class
D	Drivers' Championship
S	Synsam Cup

== Race calendar and winners ==
Round		Circuit	Date	Pole position	Fastest lap	Winning driver	Winning team	Winning privateer
1	R1	(Sweden) Mantorp Park	25 April	(Norway) Tommy Rustad	(Norway) Tommy Rustad	(Sweden) Fredrik Ekblom	BMW Dealer Team	(Sweden) Peggen Andersson
1	R2	(Sweden) Mantorp Park	25 April	(Sweden) Hubert Bergh	(Sweden) Jens Edman	(Sweden) Mattias Ekström	Kristoffersson Motorsport	(Sweden) Peggen Andersson
2	R3	(Sweden) Ring Knutstorp	16 May	(Sweden) Mattias Ekström	(Sweden) Mattias Ekström	(Sweden) Mattias Ekström	Kristoffersson Motorsport	(Sweden) Peggen Andersson
2	R4	(Sweden) Ring Knutstorp	16 May	(Sweden) Jan Nilsson	(Sweden) Carl Rosenblad	(Sweden) Jan Nilsson	Volvo S40 Racing Team Sweden	(Norway) Kim Esbjug
3	R5	(Sweden) Karlskoga-Gelleråsen	30 May	(Norway) Tommy Rustad	(Norway) Tommy Rustad	(Norway) Tommy Rustad	Elgh Motorsport	(Sweden) Peggen Andersson
3	R6	(Sweden) Karlskoga-Gelleråsen	30 May	(Sweden) Mattias Ekström	(Sweden) Fredrik Ekblom	(Sweden) Mattias Ekström	Kristoffersson Motorsport	(Sweden) Peggen Andersson
4	R7	(Sweden) Anderstorp	20 June	(Norway) Tommy Rustad	(Norway) Tommy Rustad	(Norway) Tommy Rustad	Elgh Motorsport	(Sweden) Pontus Mörth
4	R8	(Sweden) Anderstorp	20 June	(Norway) Tommy Rustad	(Norway) Tommy Rustad	(Norway) Tommy Rustad	Elgh Motorsport	(Norway) Tord Linnerud
5	R9	(Sweden) Falkenberg	18 July	(Sweden) Thomas Johansson	(Sweden) Jens Edman	(Sweden) Fredrik Ekblom	BMW Dealer Team	(Sweden) Pontus Mörth
5	R10	(Sweden) Falkenberg	18 July	(Sweden) Carl Rosenblad	(Sweden) Carl Rosenblad	(Sweden) Carl Rosenblad	Elgh Motorsport	(Sweden) Pontus Mörth
6	R11	(Sweden) Anderstorp	1 August	(Norway) Tommy Rustad	(Norway) Tommy Rustad	(Norway) Tommy Rustad	Elgh Motorsport	(Sweden) Peggen Andersson
6	R12	(Sweden) Anderstorp	1 August	(Norway) Tommy Rustad	(Norway) Tommy Rustad	(Norway) Tommy Rustad	Elgh Motorsport	(Sweden) Peggen Andersson
7	R13	(Norway) Arctic Circle Raceway	15 August	(Norway) Tommy Rustad	(Norway) Tommy Rustad	(Norway) Tommy Rustad	Elgh Motorsport	(Norway) Tord Linnerud
7	R14	(Norway) Arctic Circle Raceway	15 August	(Norway) Tommy Rustad	(Norway) Tommy Rustad	(Norway) Tommy Rustad	Elgh Motorsport	(Norway) Kim Esbjug
8	R15	(Sweden) Mantorp Park	29 August	(Sweden) Jan Nilsson	(Sweden) Fredrik Ekblom	(Sweden) Mattias Ekström	Kristoffersson Motorsport	(Sweden) Peggen Andersson
8	R16	(Sweden) Mantorp Park	29 August	(Sweden) Carl Rosenblad	(Sweden) Fredrik Ekblom	(Sweden) Fredrik Ekblom	BMW Dealer Team	(Norway) Kim Esbjug

== Championship standings ==
=== Drivers' Championship ===
Points were awarded to the top ten drivers in a race as follows: 20, 15, 12, 10, 8, 6, 4, 3, 2, 1.
Each driver could drop their two worst results.
The final meeting of the year saw double points awarded.

Pos.	Driver	MAN (Sweden)		KNU (Sweden)		KAR (Sweden)		AND (Sweden)		FAL (Sweden)		AND (Sweden)		ARC (Norway)		MAN (Sweden)		Pts
1	(Sweden) Mattias Ekström	3	1	**1**	2	2	**1**	23	17	3	6	3	8	6	7	1	2	215
2	(Sweden) Fredrik Ekblom	1	4	2	7	3	2	21	2	1	5	Ret	3	5	6	3	1	209
3	(Norway) Tommy Rustad	**2**	Ret	6	9	**1**	Ret	**1**	**1**	5	2	**1**	**1**	**1**	**1**	18	Ret	186
4	(Sweden) Jens Edman	4	2	Ret	10	4	Ret	2	DNS	2	4	7	7	3	4	Ret	3	130
5	(Sweden) Jan Nilsson	6	6	Ret	**1**	6	Ret			6	3	2	4	7	2	**4**	Ret	120
6	(Sweden) Carl Rosenblad	10	7	10	3	7	6	4	5	Ret	**1**	5	2	2	3	11	**Ret**	116
7	(Sweden) Hubert Bergh	Ret	**DNS**	3	DNS	10	3	5	3	4	Ret	Ret	5	12	17	10	4	85
8	(Norway) Thomas Schie	8	5	8	Ret	Ret	DNS	16	DNS	7	DNS			4	5	2	DSQ	66
9	(Sweden) Tommy Kristoffersson	5	8	5	4	5	Ret	20	4	9	9	9	10	8	8	DSQ	Ret	60
10	(Sweden) Thomas Johansson	9	3	7	5	Ret	DNS	3	Ret	**Ret**	Ret	4	6	10	12	Ret	DNS	55
11	(Sweden) Peggen Andersson	7	9	4	14	8	4	Ret	Ret	12	13	6	9	14	15	6	Ret	49
12	(Norway) Kim Esbjug	11	16	9	6	14	8	12	7	10	8	10	14	13	9	14	5	38
13	(Sweden) Tomas Engström	Ret	Ret	16	11	Ret	5	6	Ret	Ret	11	Ret	Ret	9	10	5	Ret	33
14	(Norway) Tord Linnerud	13	11	17	18	15	7	11	6	Ret	12	DNS	13	11	11	8	6	28
15	(Sweden) Pontus Mörth			11	8	Ret	Ret	7	9	8	7	Ret	11					16
16	(Sweden) Tobias Johansson	18	18	22	21			22	14	15	18	Ret	18	17	14	7	7	16
17	(Sweden) Tomas Nyström	12	Ret	13	15	18	12	Ret	Ret	14	Ret			15	Ret	9	8	10
18	(Sweden) Jan Brunstedt	Ret	15	15	12	9	Ret	9	11	Ret	10	Ret	DNS	19	16	12	9	9
19	(Sweden) Stefan Lindberg	14	Ret	Ret	20	12	9	8	10	13	16	14	Ret			19	Ret	6
20	(Sweden) Anders Svensson	Ret	Ret	19	16	11	Ret	10	8	Ret	17	Ret	DNS	21	DNS	15	Ret	4
21	(Sweden) Mats Lindén											8	12					3
22	(Sweden) Rolf Uhr	17	14	18	19	17	11	14	Ret	Ret	DNS	Ret	Ret	16	13	16	10	2
23	(Sweden) Georg Bakajev	Ret	10	14	22	13	Ret	Ret	DNS	Ret	20	11	15			DNS	DNS	1
24	(Sweden) Peter Hallén	15	17	12	13	16	10	17	12			12	Ret					1
25	(Sweden) Jimmy Bohlin	16	12	Ret	DNS	Ret	Ret	13	16	11	14	Ret	Ret			13	Ret	0
26	(Sweden) Niklas Danielsson	22	13	21	17	Ret	Ret	19	13	Ret	15	13	16			17	Ret	0
27	(Sweden) Niklas Karlsson	Ret	19	Ret	DNS	19	Ret	15	15	17	Ret	Ret	Ret			Ret	Ret	0
28	(Sweden) Torbjörn Holmstedt	20	22					24	19			15	19	20	19	DNS	DNS	0
29	(Sweden) Nettan Lindgren-Jansson	Ret	DNS	20	23	Ret	Ret	18	18	16	19	Ret	17			Ret	Ret	0
30	(Norway) Frank Valle	21	20									16	DNS	18	18	20	DNS	0
31	(Sweden) Börje Gostafsson	19	21															0
Pos.	Driver	MAN (Sweden)		KNU (Sweden)		KAR (Sweden)		AND (Sweden)		FAL (Sweden)		AND (Sweden)		ARC (Norway)		MAN (Sweden)		Pts

Colour	Result
Gold	Winner
Silver	Second place
Bronze	Third place
Green	Points classification
Blue	Non-points classification
Blue	Non-classified finish (NC)
Purple	Retired, not classified (Ret)
Red	Did not qualify (DNQ)
Red	Did not pre-qualify (DNPQ)
Black	Disqualified (DSQ)
White	Did not start (DNS)
White	Withdrew (WD)
White	Race cancelled (C)
Blank	Did not practice (DNP)
Blank	Did not arrive (DNA)
Blank	Excluded (EX)

**Bold** – Pole
Italics – Fastest Lap

=== Synsam Cup for Privateers ===
Pos.	Driver	MAN (Sweden)		KNU (Sweden)		KAR (Sweden)		AND (Sweden)		FAL (Sweden)		AND (Sweden)		ARC (Norway)		MAN (Sweden)		Pts
1	(Norway) Kim Esbjug	11	16	9	6	14	8	12	7	10	8	10	14	13	9	14	5	239
2	(Sweden) Peggen Andersson	7	9	4	14	8	4	Ret	Ret	12	13	6	9	14	15	6	Ret	230
3	(Norway) Tord Linnerud	13	11	17	18	15	7	11	6	Ret	12	DNS	13	11	11	8	6	200
4	(Sweden) Pontus Mörth			11	8	Ret	Ret	7	9	8	7	Ret	11					112
5	(Sweden) Tomas Nyström	12	Ret	13	15	18	12	Ret	Ret	14	Ret			15	Ret	9	8	95
6	(Sweden) Tobias Johansson	18	18	22	21			22	14	15	18	Ret	18	17	14	7	7	94
7	(Sweden) Rolf Uhr	17	14	18	19	17	11	14	Ret	Ret	DNS	Ret	Ret	16	13	16	10	75
8	(Sweden) Peter Hallén	15	17	12	13	16	10	17	12			12	Ret					70
9	(Sweden) Anders Svensson	Ret	Ret	19	16	11	Ret	10	8	Ret	17	Ret	DNS	21	DNS	15	Ret	64
10	(Sweden) Jimmy Bohlin	16	12	Ret	DNS	Ret	Ret	13	16	11	14	Ret	Ret			13	Ret	62
11	(Sweden) Georg Bakajev	Ret	10	14	22	13	Ret	Ret	DNS	Ret	20	11	15			DNS	DNS	55
12	(Sweden) Niklas Danielsson	22	13	21	17	Ret	Ret	19	13	Ret	15	13	16			17	Ret	45
13	(Sweden) Torbjörn Holmstedt	20	22					24	19			15	19	20	19	DNS	DNS	20
14	(Norway) Frank Valle	21	20									16	DNS	18	18	20	DNS	16
15	(Sweden) Niklas Karlsson	Ret	19	Ret	DNS	19	Ret	15	15	17	Ret	Ret	Ret			Ret	Ret	14
16	(Sweden) Börje Gostafsson	19	21															2
Pos.	Driver	MAN (Sweden)		KNU (Sweden)		KAR (Sweden)		AND (Sweden)		FAL (Sweden)		AND (Sweden)		ARC (Norway)		MAN (Sweden)		Pts

Colour	Result
Gold	Winner
Silver	Second place
Bronze	Third place
Green	Points classification
Blue	Non-points classification
Blue	Non-classified finish (NC)
Purple	Retired, not classified (Ret)
Red	Did not qualify (DNQ)
Red	Did not pre-qualify (DNPQ)
Black	Disqualified (DSQ)
White	Did not start (DNS)
White	Withdrew (WD)
White	Race cancelled (C)
Blank	Did not practice (DNP)
Blank	Did not arrive (DNA)
Blank	Excluded (EX)
