= Mattias Ekström =

Swedish racing and rally driver (born 1978)

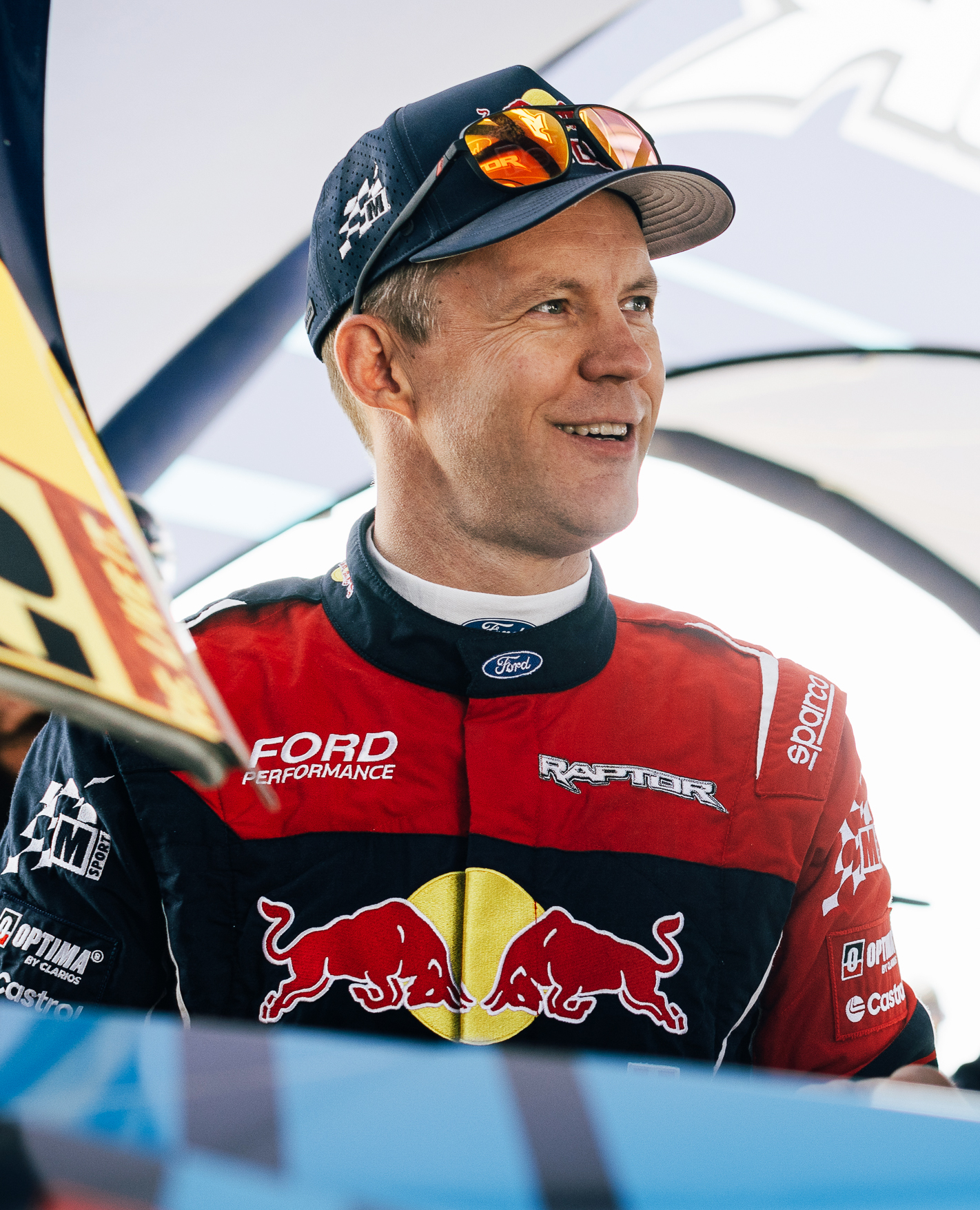
- Ekström in 2025
- Nationality: (Sweden) Swedish
- Born: Bengt Mattias Ekström; 14 July 1978 (age 48) Falun, Sweden
- Current team: M-Sport Ford

Dakar Rally career
- Years active: 2021–present
- Co-driver: Emil Bergkvist
- Former teams: Audi Sport, Yamaha
- Starts: 5
- Wins: 0
- Podiums: 1
- Best finish: 3rd in 2025

FIA World Rallycross Championship career
- Debut season: 2014
- Car number: 5
- Former teams: KYB Team JC
- Starts: 60
- Championships: 1 (2016)
- Wins: 12
- Podiums: 27
- Finished last season: 2nd

DTM career
- Years active: 2001–2018
- Former teams: Abt Sportsline
- Starts: 217
- Championships: 2 (2004, 2007)
- Wins: 25
- Podiums: 83
- Poles: 20
- Fastest laps: 17

FIA ERX Supercar Championship career
- Years active: 2013–2014
- Former teams: Marklund Motorsport
- Starts: 3
- Wins: 1
- Podiums: 2
- Best finish: 10th in 2014

STCC career
- Years active: 1997–2000
- Former teams: Volvo S40 Racing Team Sweden; Kristoffersson Motorsport; Troberg – Rydell Junior Team
- Starts: 55
- Championships: 1 (1999)
- Wins: 11
- Podiums: 30
- Poles: 6
- Fastest laps: 9

Previous series
- 2013 2010 1995–1996: V8 Supercars; NASCAR Sprint Cup Series; Renault 5 Junior Sweden

Championship titles
- 2021 2016 2004, 2007 1999 1996: Pure ETCR; World Rallycross; DTM; STCC; Renault 5 Junior Sweden

World Rally Championship record
- Years active: 1999–2000, 2003–2006, 2021
- Co-driver: (Sweden) Tina Thörner (Sweden) Stefan Bergman (Sweden) Jonas Andersson (Sweden) Emil Bergkvist
- Teams: Škoda Motorsport
- Rallies: 9
- Championships: 0
- Rally wins: 0
- Podiums: 0
- Stage wins: 0
- Total points: 0
- First rally: 1999 Rally Sweden
- Last rally: 2021 Arctic Rally

Bengt Mattias Ekström (born 14 July 1978) is a Swedish racing and rally driver who currently drives in the World Rally-Raid Championship for Ford Racing. He is a two-time champion of the Deutsche Tourenwagen Masters, where he raced for Audi between 2001 and 2018, a four-time winner of the Race of Champions, and an FIA World Rallycross champion. Ekström has also won several Dakar Rally stages for Audi and Ford.

== Career ==
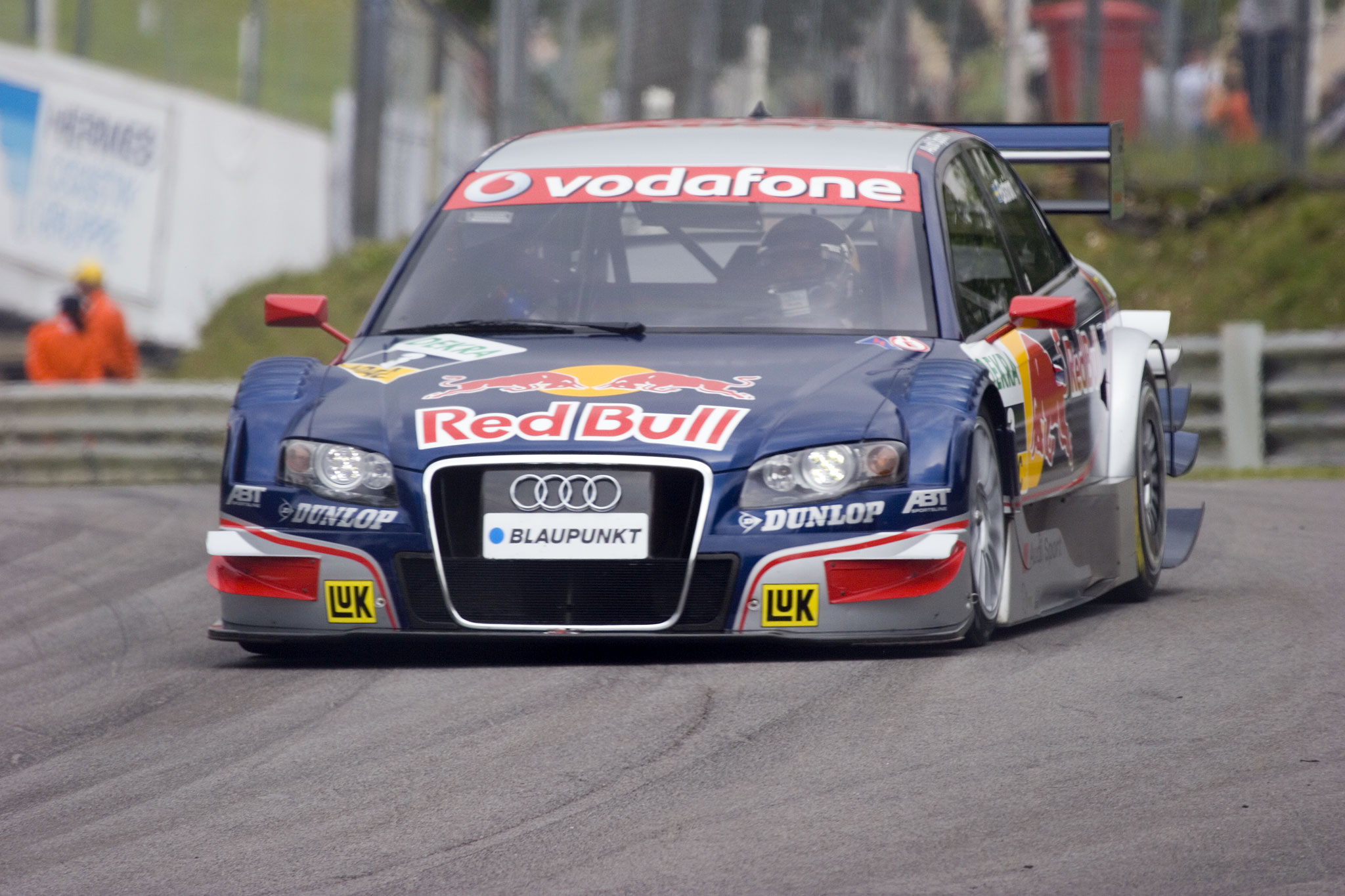
Ekström won his second DTM championship in 2007.

Ekström debuted in karting in 1993. In the following years, he competed at the Renault 5 Turbo Cup, winning the championship in 1996. He progressed to the Swedish Touring Car Championship in 1997, finishing runner-up with a Volvo 850. In 1998, he drove a Ford Mondeo, claiming four podiums. Ekström won the 1999 championship driving an Audi A4 quattro. He switched rides again in 2000, finishing third with a factory Volvo S40.

In 2001, Ekström joined the Abt Junior team to compete at the Deutsche Tourenwagen Masters. Driving Audi TT, he finished eighth in his debut season, third in 2002, and fourth in 2003.

In 2004, Ekström won the 2004 Deutsche Tourenwagen Masters, defeating Mercedes rivals Gary Paffett and Christijan Albers. In the 2005 DTM season he finished second behind Paffett.

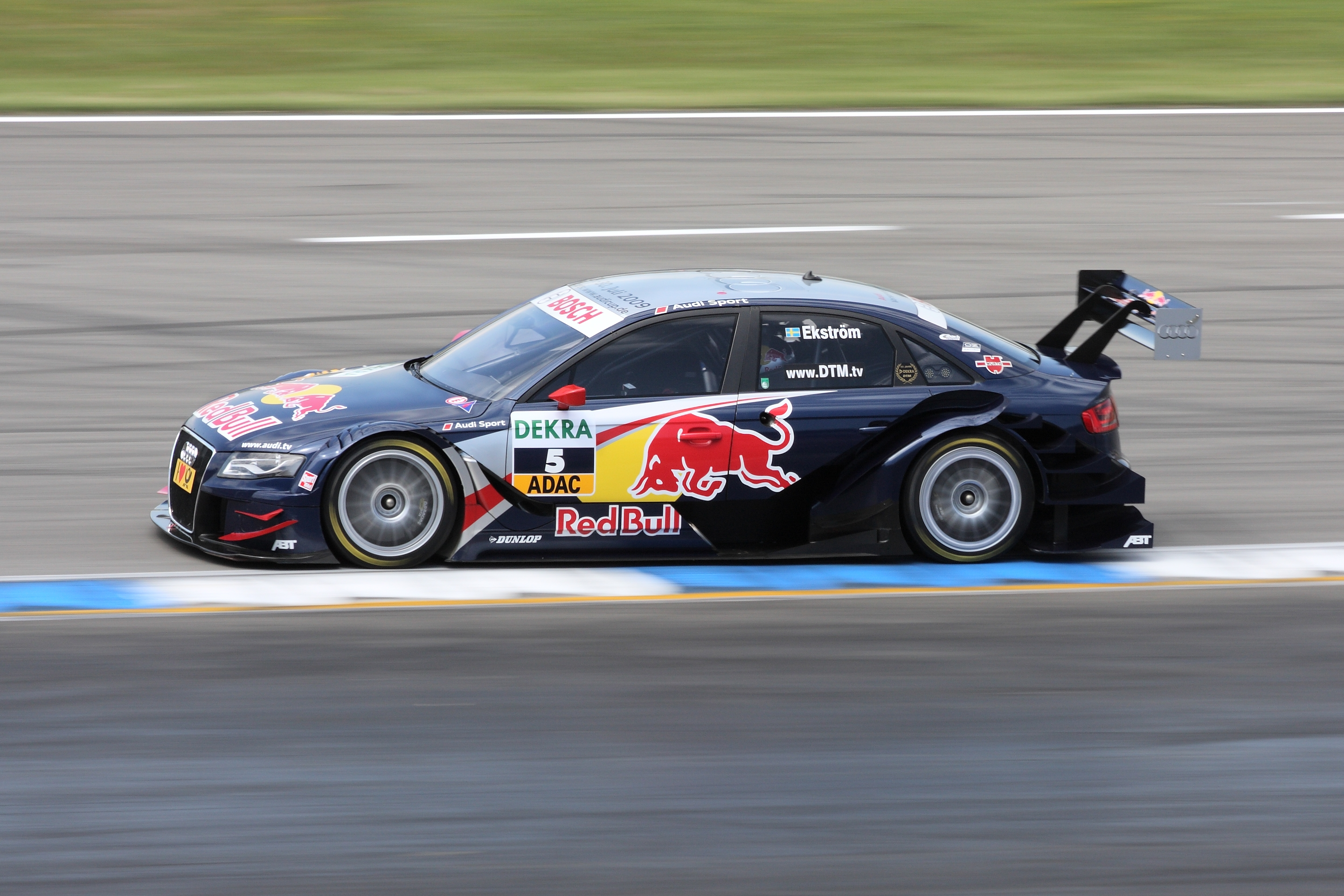
Ekström competing at the opening round of the 2009 Deutsche Tourenwagen Masters season at Hockenheim.

Ekström has also been active in rallying and the World Rally Championship. He debuted in the WRC in 1999 and recorded his best result at the 2005 Swedish Rally, finishing tenth in a Škoda factory team Fabia WRC. At the 2005 Race of Champions, Ekström won the Nations' Cup with Tom Kristensen. In 2006, he won the Henri Toivonen Memorial Trophy and earned the title Champion of Champions at the 2006 Race of Champions, by winning over Sébastien Loeb in the individual event finals.

After a poor 2006 season, Ekström won his second DTM title in 2007 and went on to win the 2007 Race of Champions, beating Michael Schumacher in the individual finals. In 2009, he won the Race of Champions once more beating the seven-time world champion in the final.

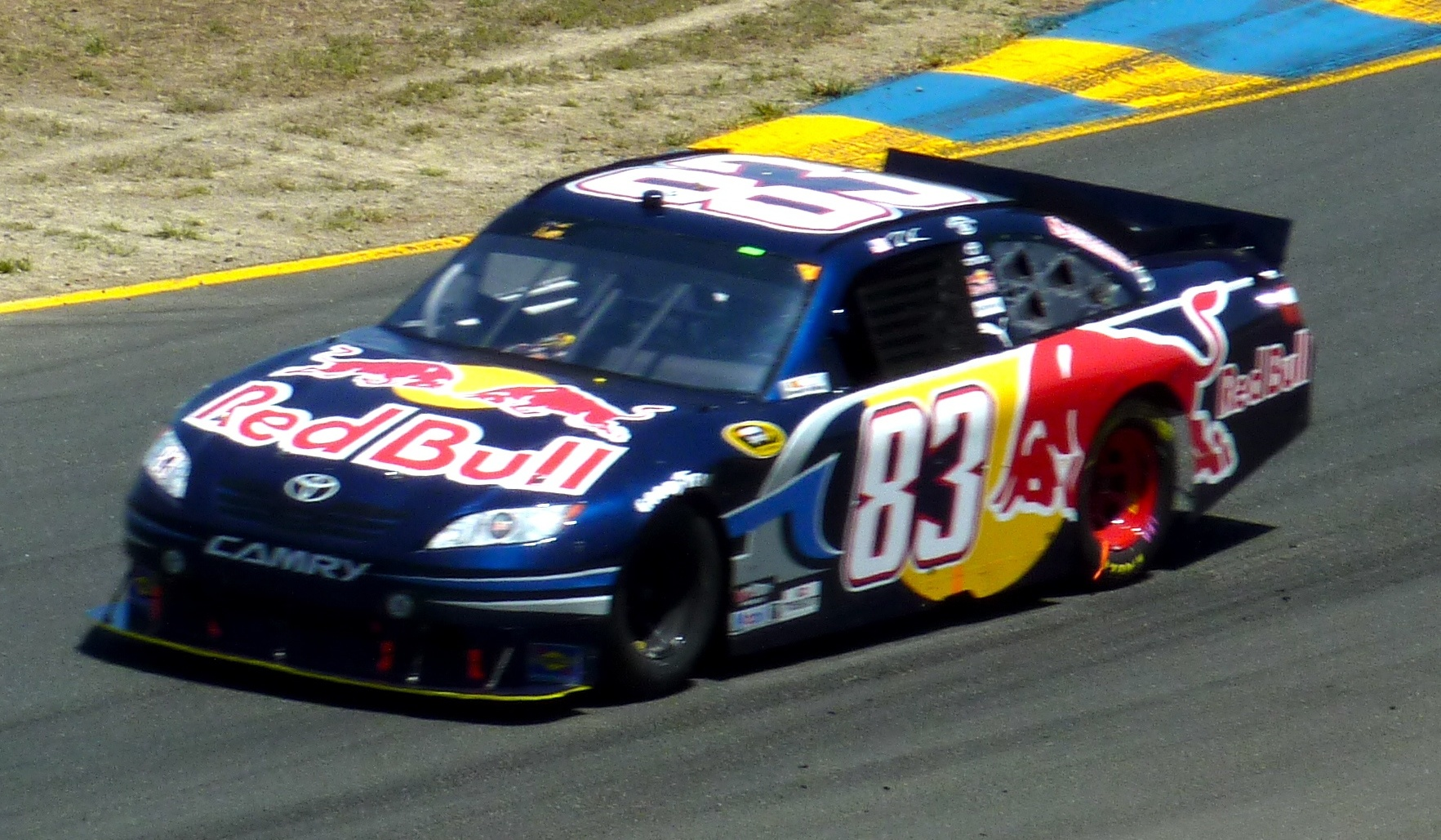
Ekström's No. 83 car at Sonoma Raceway in 2010

Ekström became the first Scandinavian driver to take part in the NASCAR Sprint Cup Series in June 2010. He raced for Team Red Bull at Infineon Raceway, substituting for Brian Vickers in the No. 83 Toyota Camry, as Vickers was inactive for the remainder of the 2010 season due to blood clots. Ekström was able to finish 21st and lead seven laps, mostly remaining in the top-five or top-ten the whole day. However he did so ex-aequo with another Scandinavian driver as Jan Magnussen from Denmark also took part in the same race, eventually finishing ahead of Ekström. Ekström also ran the Air Guard 400 at Richmond International Raceway where he started 42nd and finished 31st.

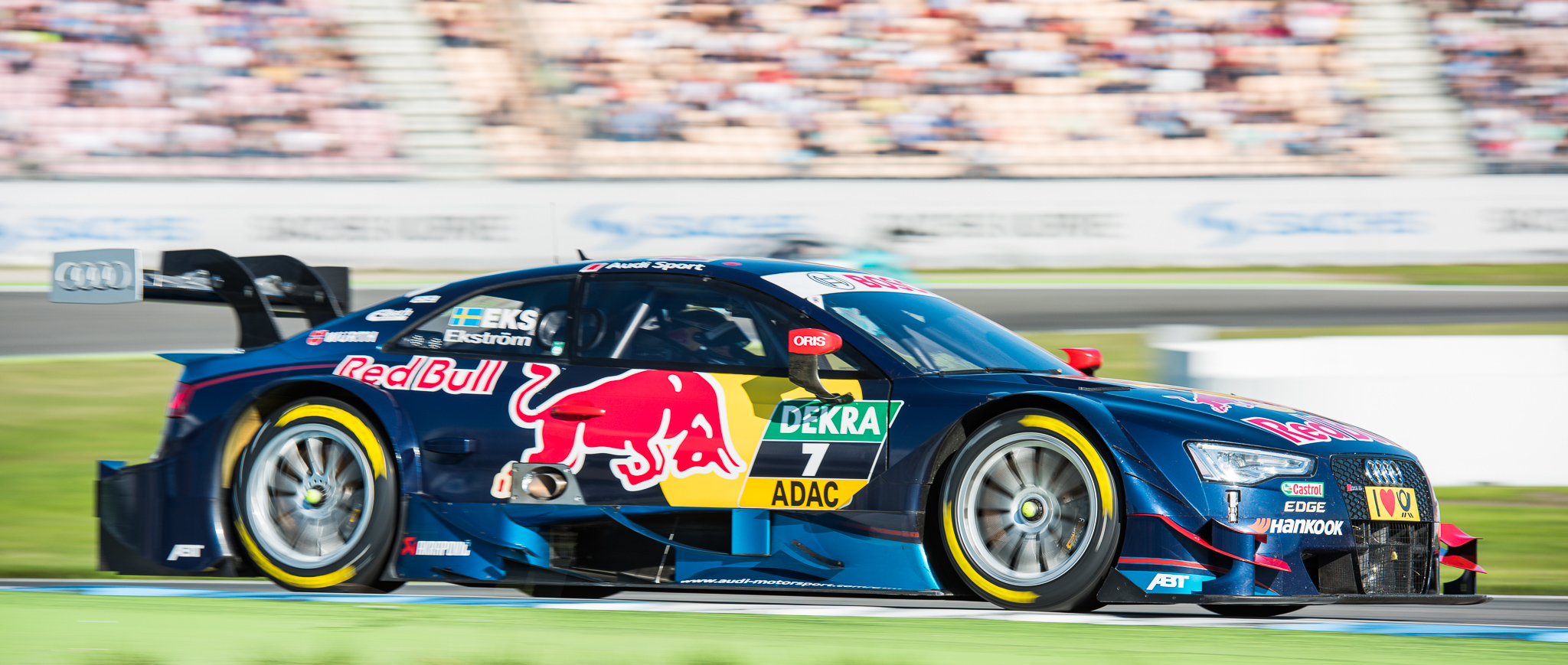
Ekström competing in the 2014 DTM season.

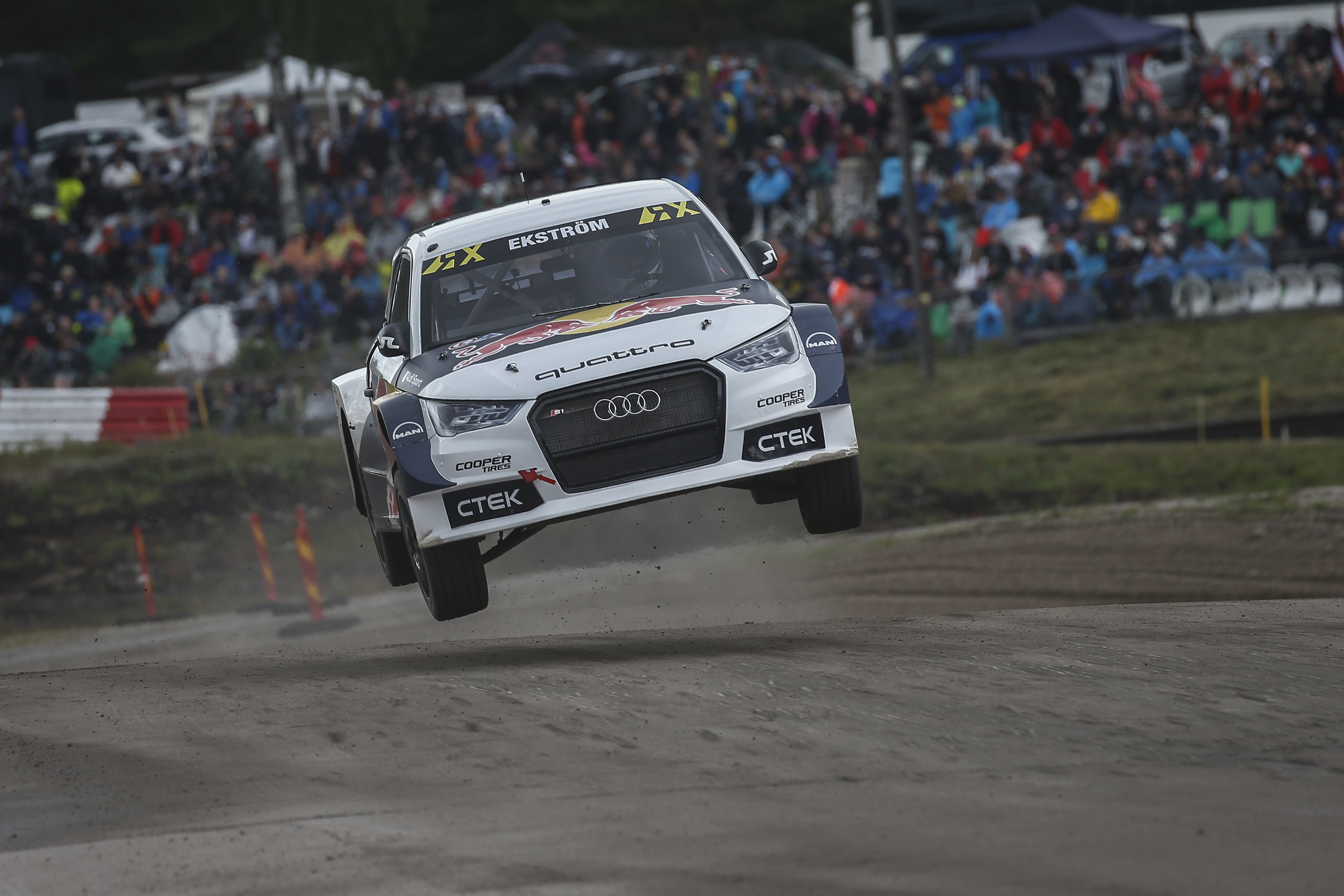
Ekström in his Audi S1 at the 2016 World RX of Sweden

Ekström followed in the footsteps of his father Bengt by branching out into rallycross in 2013, competing in the Swedish round of the European Rallycross Championship in Höljes, finishing second in a Volkswagen Polo. He subsequently announced that he was establishing his own EKS RX team to compete in the FIA World Rallycross Championship. The team made their debut at the Norwegian round of the 2014 World Rallycross Championship season in Hell, fielding a pair of Audi S1s for Ekström and 2013 Junior World Rally Champion Pontus Tidemand.

Ekström is widely regarded as one of the most versatile drivers in the world. He also participated in the Bathurst 1000 in 2013 alongside Andy Priaulx in a 'wildcard' entry. The entry qualified nineteenth and finished tenth, with former 1000 winner turned commentator Mark Skaife hailing his efforts, stating that he was "one of the best debutants I have seen", as well as being "the best international driver since Jacky Ickx". Ickx won the race on debut with Allan Moffat in 1977.

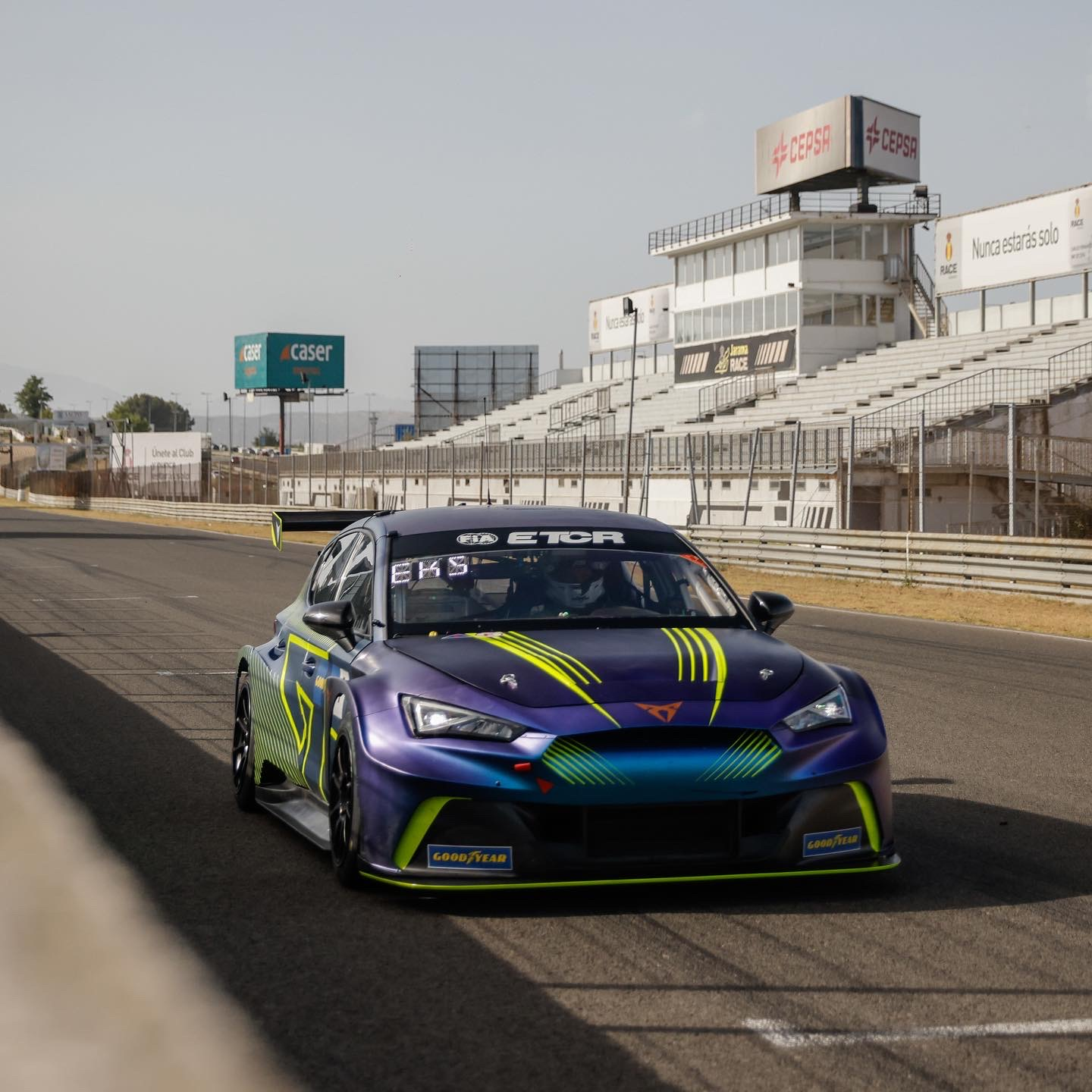
Mattias Ekström in Cupra e-Racer at FIA ETCR 2022

In January 2018, Ekström announced that he would be retiring from DTM, to concentrate on running his rallycross team, now with added support from Audi Sport. However, at the end of the season Audi decided to withdraw its works programme, leaving Ekström's team in limbo, with some of the team's Audi S1 were sold to the privateers. Eventually the team stayed as one-car privateer after signing Krisztián Szabó from Hungary, with Ekström does a wildcard entry at the inaugural World Rallycross event in Spa Francochamps.

Ekström returned to the World Rallycross Championship in 2020 season, initially as a wildcard for the first two rounds in Sweden for the JC Race Teknik team, which coincidentally, running two EKS RX's Audi S1. He replaced Latvian Jānis Baumanis who was unable to do the full season with the team due to funding issues caused by COVID-19 pandemic. Ekström ended up signed with the team for another two double-header rounds in Finland and Latvia, which he got two wins and five podiums out of six events so far, making him the championship contender along with fellow Swede Johan Kristoffersson.

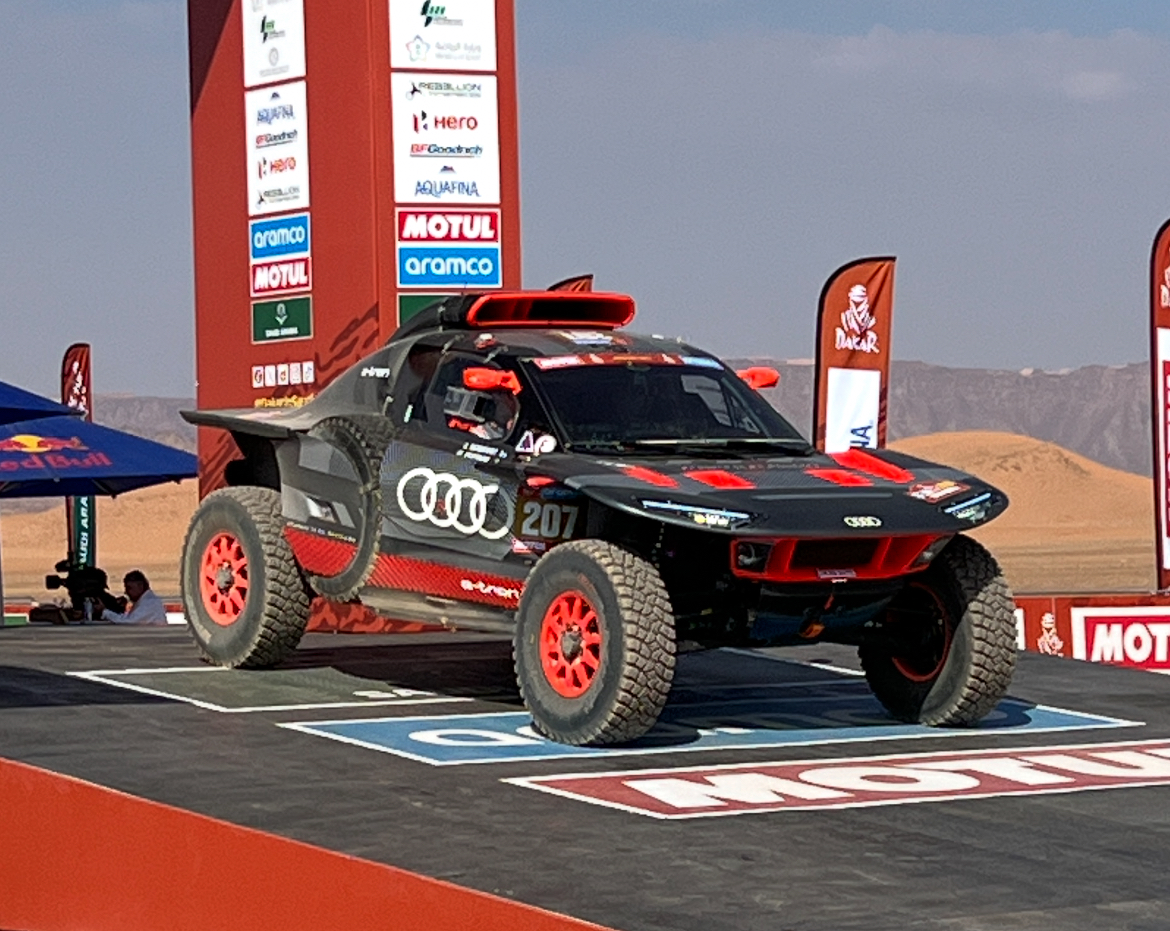
Mattias Ekström at the start of Dakar 2024

In 2021, Ekström made his first attempt at the Dakar Rally with a Yamaha side-by-side car. Although the race was riddled with technical issues and other problems, it provided valuable experience for his future Dakar ambitions.

Alongside his rally-raid training program, Ekström entered the world of electric touring cars by joining Cupra x Zengő Motorsport for the inaugural season of Pure ETCR (later rebranded as FIA ETCR). He won Cupra’s home event in Spain and finished on the podium at all other races. This performance earned him the drivers’ title and secured the teams’ title for Cupra. He also competed in the Extreme E electric off-road championship with the Abt Cupra team. Later in the year, Ekström was announced as a works driver for the Audi Dakar project alongside Dakar legends Carlos Sainz and Stéphane Peterhansel.

Ekström, together with his navigator Emil Bergkvist, began the 2022 Dakar Rally in the innovative Audi RS Q e-tron rally-raid car. The crew won one stage and finished the rally in ninth place overall. Throughout the year, Ekström also continued his circuit racing career with the Cupra EKS team in the FIA ETCR championship, where he finished second in the overall standings and helped secure the manufacturers’ title.

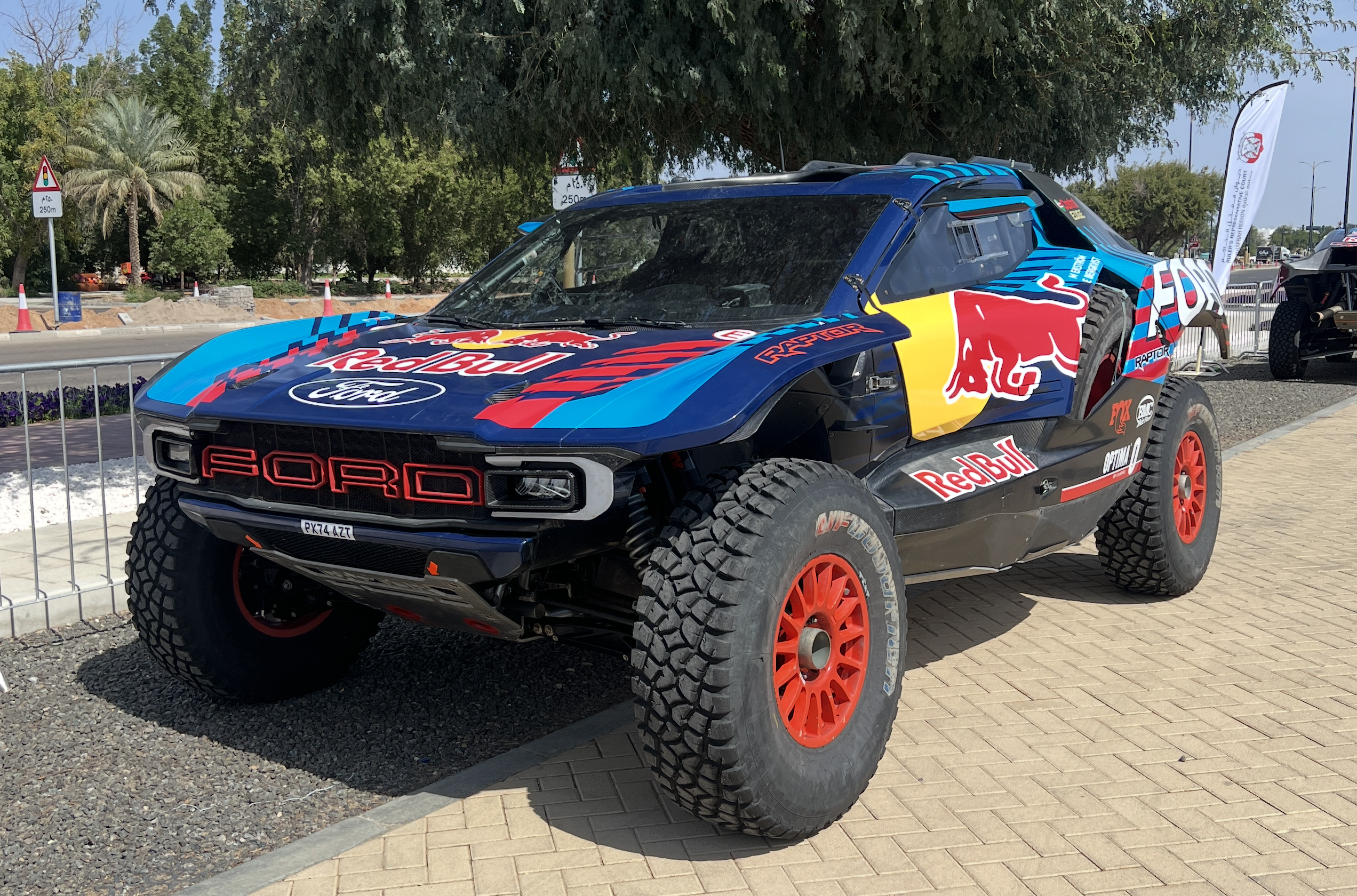
Ekström's Ford Raptor T1+ before Abu Dhabi Desert Challenge 2025

In 2023, Ekström returned to the Dakar with Audi, but the rally proved difficult for the team as all three cars suffered misfortunes that impacted results. He finished 14th overall. After Dakar, Ekström joined the Acciona Sainz Extreme E team as the male driver, replacing Carlos Sainz, who was still recovering from a Dakar accident. The team finished third in the 2023 Extreme E season.

The 2024 Dakar Rally marked Ekström’s final race with Audi. The rally looked promising for the Ekström/Bergkvist crew until a technical issue forced them out of contention. For the remaining stages, Ekström acted as a support car for his teammate Carlos Sainz, who ultimately claimed overall victory. Ekström also joined McLaren Extreme E team, but this cooperation didn't last long, as the championship was cancelled mid season.

On 1 October 2024, Ekström announced his move to the M-Sport Ford team for their Dakar program. The 2025 Dakar Rally, contested in the newly built Ford Raptor T1+, was Ekström’s most successful rally at the time. The crew climbed into the top-three early in the event, won one stage, and finished the rally in third place overall. The crew of Ekström and Bergkvist repeated the result and claimed third place overall also in Dakar Rally 2026.

== Racing record ==
=== Complete Swedish Touring Car Championship results ===
(key) (Races in bold indicate pole position) (Races in italics indicate fastest lap)

Year	Team	Car	1	2	3	4	5	6	7	8	9	10	11	12	13	14	15	16	DC	Pts
1997	Troberg – Rydell Junior Team	Volvo 850 GLT	MAN; 1; 1	MAN; 2; 1	KIN; 1 Ret	KIN; 2; 4	AND; 1; 1	AND; 2; 4	**FAL**; **1**; 2	FAL; 2 Ret	KNU; 1 Ret	KNU; 2; 2	KAR; 1; 6	KAR; 2; 1					2nd	192
1998	Troberg – Rydell Junior Team	Ford Mondeo Ghia	**MAN**; **1** Ret	MAN; 2; 8	KAR; 1; 3	KAR; 2 Ret	**AND**; **1**; 2	AND; 2; 3	FAL; 1 Ret	FAL; 2 Ret	KNU; 1; 4	KNU; 2; 2	MAN; 1 Ret	MAN; 2 DNS					8th	97
1999	Kristoffersson Motorsport	Audi A4 Quattro	MAN; 1; 3	MAN; 2; 1	**KNU**; **1**; 1	KNU; 2; 2	KAR; 1; 2	**KAR**; **2**; 1	AND; 1; 23	AND; 2; 17	FAL; 1; 3	FAL; 2; 6	AND; 1; 3	AND; 2; 8	ARC; 1; 6	ARC; 2; 7	MAN; 1; 1	MAN; 2; 2	1st	215
2000	Volvo S40 Racing Team Sweden	Volvo S40	KAR; 1; 2	KAR; 2; 3	KNU; 1; 10	KNU; 2; 9	MAN; 1; 3	MAN; 2; 2	FAL; 1; 1	FAL; 2; 2	AND; 1; 4	AND; 2; 6	**ARC**; **1**; 1	ARC; 2; 1	KAR; 1; 4	KAR; 2; 5	MAN; 1; 3	MAN; 2; 2	3rd	165

=== Complete Super Tourenwagen Cup results ===
(key) (Races in bold indicate pole position) (Races in italics indicate fastest lap)

Year	Team	Car	1	2	3	4	5	6	7	8	9	10	11	12	13	14	15	16	17	18	19	20	DC	Points
1999	Abt Sportsline	Audi A4 Quattro	SAC; 1	SAC; 2	ZWE; 1	ZWE; 2	OSC; 1	OSC; 2	NOR; 1	NOR; 2	MIS; 1	MIS; 2	NÜR; 1	NÜR; 2	SAL; 1	SAL; 2	OSC; 1; 8	OSC; 2; 4	HOC; 1	HOC; 2	NÜR; 1	NÜR; 2	23rd	47

=== Complete Deutsche Tourenwagen Masters results ===
(key) (Races in bold indicate pole position) (Races in italics indicate fastest lap)

Year	Team	Car	1	2	3	4	5	6	7	8	9	10	11	12	13	14	15	16	17	18	19	20	DC	Points
2001	Abt Sportsline Junior	Abt-Audi TT-R	HOC; QR; 17	HOC; CR; DNS	NÜR; QR; 10	NÜR; CR; 9	OSC; QR; 6	OSC; CR; 7	SAC; QR; 2	SAC; CR; 5	NOR; QR; 11	NOR; CR; 9	LAU; QR; Ret	LAU; CR; 3	NÜR; QR; 6	NÜR; CR; 14	A1R; QR; Ret	A1R; CR; 11	ZAN; QR; 2	ZAN; CR; Ret	HOC; QR; 6	HOC; CR; 6	8th	38
2002	Abt Sportsline	Abt-Audi TT-R	HOC; QR; 3	HOC; CR; 2	ZOL; QR; 4	ZOL; CR; 4	DON; QR; 9	DON; CR; 3	SAC; QR; 14	SAC; CR; 7	**NOR**; **QR**; 1	**NOR**; **CR**; 3	LAU; QR; 4	LAU; CR; 2	NÜR; QR; 16	NÜR; CR; 10	A1R; QR; 1	**A1R**; **CR**; 11	ZAN; QR; 3	ZAN; CR; 1	HOC; QR; 3	HOC; CR; 2	3rd	50
2003	Abt Sportsline	Abt-Audi TT-R	HOC; 8	ADR; 2	NÜR; 7	LAU; 3	NOR; Ret	DON; 3	**NÜR**; 4	A1R; 5	ZAN; 3	**HOC**; 2											4th	46
2004	Abt Sportsline	Audi A4 DTM 2004	HOC; 3	**EST**; 2	**ADR**; 1	LAU; 1	NOR; 4	SHA^{1} 3	NÜR; 2	OSC; 5	**ZAN**; 1	**BRN**; 1	HOC; 6										1st	74
2005	Abt Sportsline	Audi A4 DTM 2005	**HOC**; 5	LAU; 4	SPA; 2	BRN; 1	OSC; 2	NOR; 3	NÜR; 1	ZAN; 2	LAU; 1	IST; 12	HOC; 7										2nd	71
2006	Abt Sportsline	Audi A4 DTM 2006	HOC; Ret	LAU; DSQ	OSC; 7	BRH; 1	NOR; 6	NÜR; 8	ZAN; 13	CAT; 4	BUG; Ret	HOC; 12†											8th	21
2007	Abt Sportsline	Audi A4 DTM 2007	HOC; 1	OSC; 7	LAU; 10	BRH; 3	NOR; 3	**MUG**; 2	ZAN; 3	NÜR; 3	CAT; Ret	HOC; 3											1st	50
2008	Abt Sportsline	Audi A4 DTM 2008	HOC; 1	OSC; 8	MUG; 6	LAU; 3	NOR; 4	**ZAN**; 1	NÜR; 6	BRH; 3	CAT; DSQ	BUG; 1	**HOC**; 7										3rd	56
2009	Abt Sportsline	Audi A4 DTM 2009	**HOC**; 7	**LAU**; 3	NOR; 3	ZAN; 3	OSC; 2	NÜR; 3	BRH; 5	CAT; 6	DIJ; 9	**HOC**; Ret											5th	41
2010	Abt Sportsline	Audi A4 DTM 2009	HOC; 6	**VAL**; 1	LAU; Ret	NOR; 2	**NÜR**; 7	ZAN; 4	BRH; Ret	OSC; 3	HOC; Ret	ADR; 8	SHA; 9										5th	35
2011	Abt Sportsline	Audi A4 DTM 2009	HOC; 2	ZAN; 8	SPL; Ret	LAU; 11	NOR; 7	**NÜR**; 1	BRH; 2	OSC; 1	**VAL**; 1	HOC; 6											2nd	52
2012	Abt Sportsline	Audi A5 DTM	**HOC**; 3	LAU; 5	BRH; 5	SPL; 4	NOR; Ret	NÜR; 11	ZAN; 3	OSC; 8	VAL; 3	HOC; Ret											6th	81
2013	Abt Sportsline	Audi RS5 DTM	HOC; Ret	BRH; 7	SPL; 5	LAU; 8	NOR; DSQ	MSC; 2	NÜR; 13	OSC; 7	ZAN; 4	HOC; 4											7th	68
2014	Audi Sport Team Abt Sportsline	Audi RS5 DTM	HOC; 2	OSC; 13	HUN; 9	NOR; 3	MSC; 3	SPL; 7	NÜR; Ret	LAU; Ret	ZAN; 1	HOC; 1											2nd	106
2015	Audi Sport Team Abt Sportsline	Audi RS5 DTM	HOC; 1; 12	HOC; 2; 1	LAU; 1; 3	LAU; 2; 2	NOR; 1; 17	NOR; 2; 4	ZAN; 1; 13	ZAN; 2; 7	SPL; 1; 5	**SPL**; **2**; 1	MSC; 1 Ret	MSC; 2; 3	OSC; 1; 14	OSC; 2; 11	NÜR; 1; 10	NÜR; 2; 11	HOC; 1; 9	HOC; 2; 2			3rd	147
2016	Audi Sport Team Abt Sportsline	Audi RS5 DTM	HOC; 1; 9	HOC; 2 Ret	SPL; 1; 16	SPL; 2; 2	LAU; 1; 6	LAU; 2; 2	NOR; 1 Ret	NOR; 2 Ret	ZAN; 1; 7	ZAN; 2; 7	MSC; 1; 5	MSC; 2; 9	NÜR; 1 DSQ	NÜR; 2; 4	HUN; 1; 18	HUN; 2; 1	HOC; 1	HOC; 2			7th	107
2017	Audi Sport Team Abt Sportsline	Audi RS5 DTM	HOC; 1; 5	HOC; 2; 11	LAU; 1; 8	LAU; 2; 2	HUN; 1; 5	HUN; 2; 2	NOR; 1; 3	NOR; 2; 4	MSC; 1; 8	MSC; 2; 2	ZAN; 1; 17†	ZAN; 2; 3	NÜR; 1; 15	NÜR; 2; 6	SPL; 1; 1	SPL; 2; 5	HOC; 1; 11	HOC; 2; 8			2nd	176
2018	Audi Sport Team Abt Sportsline	Audi RS5 DTM	HOC; 1; 17	HOC; 2; 16	LAU; 1	LAU; 2	HUN; 1	HUN; 2	NOR; 1	NOR; 2	ZAN; 1	ZAN; 2	BRH; 1	BRH; 2	MIS; 1	MIS; 2	NÜR; 1	NÜR; 2	SPL; 1	SPL; 2	HOC; 1	HOC; 2	NC‡	0‡

^{1} Shanghai was a non-championship round.
^{†} Retired, but was classified as he completed 75% of the winner's race distance.
^{‡} As Ekström was a guest driver, he was ineligible for championship points.

=== NASCAR ===
(key) (Bold – Pole position awarded by qualifying time. Italics – Pole position earned by points standings or practice time. * – Most laps led.)

==== Sprint Cup Series ====
NASCAR Sprint Cup Series results
Year	Team	No.	Make	1	2	3	4	5	6	7	8	9	10	11	12	13	14	15	16	17	18	19	20	21	22	23	24	25	26	27	28	29	30	31	32	33	34	35	36	NSCC	Pts	Ref
2010	Team Red Bull	83	Toyota	DAY	CAL	LVS	ATL	BRI	MAR	PHO	TEX	TAL	RCH	DAR	DOV	CLT	POC	MCH	SON; 21	NHA	DAY	CHI	IND	POC	GLN	MCH	BRI	ATL	RCH; 31	NHA	DOV	KAN	CAL	CLT	MAR	TAL	TEX	PHO	HOM	58th	175	

=== Complete V8 Supercar results ===
(key) (Races in bold indicate pole position) (Races in italics indicate fastest lap)

Year	Team	No.	Car	1	2	3	4	5	6	7	8	9	10	11	12	13	14	15	16	17	18	19	20	21	22	23	24	25	26	27	28	29	30	31	32	33	34	35	36	Pos	Points
2013	Triple Eight Race Engineering	10	Holden VF Commodore	ADE; R1	ADE; R2	SYM; R3	SYM; R4	SYM; R5	PUK; R6	PUK; R7	PUK; R8	PUK; R9	BAR; R10	BAR; R11	BAR; R12	COTA; R13	COTA; R14	COTA; R15	COTA; R16	HID; R17	HID; R18	HID; R19	TOW; R20	TOW; R21	QLD; R22	QLD; R23	QLD; R24	WIN; R25	WIN; R26	WIN; R27	SAN; R28	BAT; R29; 10	SUR; R30	SUR; R31	PHI; R32	PHI; R33	PHI; R34	SYD; R35	SYD; R36	55th	156

=== Complete WRC results ===
(key)

Year	Entrant	Car	1	2	3	4	5	6	7	8	9	10	11	12	13	14	15	16	WDC	Points
1999	Mattias Ekström	Mitsubishi Lancer Evo IV	MON	SWE; 30	KEN	POR	ESP	FRA	ARG	GRE	NZL	FIN	CHN	ITA	AUS	GBR			NC	0
2000	Mattias Ekström	Mitsubishi Lancer Evo IV	MON	SWE; 21	KEN	POR	ESP	ARG	GRE	NZL	FIN	CYP	FRA	ITA	AUS	GBR			NC	0
2003	Mattias Ekström	Mitsubishi Lancer Evo VII	MON	SWE; 23	TUR	NZL	ARG	GRE	CYP	GER	FIN	AUS	ITA	FRA	ESP	GBR			NC	0
2004	Mattias Ekström	Mitsubishi Lancer Evo VII	MON	SWE; 12	MEX	NZL	CYP	GRE	TUR	ARG	FIN	GER; 24	JPN	GBR	ITA	FRA	ESP	AUS	NC	0
2005	Škoda Motorsport	Škoda Fabia WRC	MON	SWE; 10	MEX	NZL	ITA	CYP	TUR	GRE	ARG	FIN	GER	GBR	JPN	FRA	ESP	AUS	NC	0
2006	Škoda Motorsport	Škoda Fabia WRC	MON	SWE; Ret	MEX	ESP	FRA	ARG	ITA	GRE	GER; 11	FIN	JPN	CYP	TUR	AUS	NZL	GBR	NC	0
2021	Mattias Ekström	Škoda Fabia R5 Evo	MON	ARC; 19	CRO	POR	ITA	KEN	EST	BEL	GRE	FIN	ESP	MNZ					NC	0

=== Complete Global RallyCross Championship results ===
(key)

==== Supercar ====
Year	Entrant	Car	1	2	3	4	5	6	7	8	9	GRC	Points
2013	Marklund Motorsport	Volkswagen Polo	BRA	MUN1; 5	MUN2; 4	LOU	BRI	LAN	ATL	CHA	LVS	15th	26

=== Complete FIA European Rallycross Championship results ===
(key)

==== Supercar ====
Year	Entrant	Car	1	2	3	4	5	6	7	8	9	ERX	Points
2013	Marklund Motorsport	Volkswagen Polo	GBR	POR	HUN	FIN	NOR	SWE; 2	FRA	AUT	GER	17th	23
2014	EKS RX	Audi S1	GBR	NOR; 11	BEL	GER; 1	ITA					10th	22

=== Complete FIA World Rallycross Championship results ===
(key)

==== Supercar/RX1 ====
Year	Entrant	Car	1	2	3	4	5	6	7	8	9	10	11	12	13	WRX	Points
2014	EKS RX	Audi S1	POR	GBR	NOR; 19	FIN	SWE; 1	BEL	CAN	FRA	GER; 2	ITA	TUR	ARG		11th	55
2015	EKS RX	Audi S1	POR; 7	HOC	BEL; 6	GBR; 2	GER; 15	SWE; 1	CAN; 6	NOR; 12	FRA; 5	BAR; 7	TUR; 4	ITA	ARG; 2	6th	201
2016	EKS RX	Audi S1	POR; 7	HOC; 1	BEL; 1	GBR; 1	NOR; 3	SWE; 6	CAN; 8	FRA; 8	BAR; 1	LAT; 2	GER; 5	ARG; 5		1st	272
2017	EKS RX	Audi S1	BAR; 1	POR; 1	HOC; 1	BEL; 4	GBR; 5	NOR; 4	SWE	CAN; 7	FRA; 3	LAT; 2	GER; 1	RSA; 3		2nd	255
2018	EKS Audi Sport	Audi S1	BAR; 6	POR; 7	BEL; 4	GBR; 4	NOR; 2	SWE; 6	CAN; 4	FRA; 4	LAT; 2	USA; 6	GER; 2	RSA; 2		2nd	248
2019	EKS Audi Sport	Audi S1	UAE	ESP	BEL; 11	GBR	NOR	SWE	CAN	FRA	LAT	RSA				22nd	8
2020	Sweden KYB Team JC	Audi S1	SWE; 2	SWE; 1	FIN; 7	FIN; 2	LAT; 2	LAT; 1	ESP; 5	ESP; 4						2nd	192
2021	ALL-INKL.COM Münnich Motorsport	SEAT Ibiza	BAR	SWE	FRA	LAT; 7	LAT; 4	BEL	PRT	GER	GER					10th	37

=== Dakar Rally results ===
Year	Class	Vehicle	Position	Stages won
2021	Light Prototype	(Japan) Yamaha	DNF	0
2022	Car	(Germany) Audi	9th	1
2023	Car	(Germany) Audi	14th	1
2024	Car	(Germany) Audi	26th	2
2025	Car	(United States) Ford	**3rd**	1
2026	Car	(United States) Ford	**3rd**	4

=== Bathurst 1000 results ===
Year	Team	Car	Co-driver	Position	Lap
2013	Triple Eight Race Engineering	Holden Commodore VF	(United Kingdom) Andy Priaulx	10th	161

=== Complete Extreme E results ===
(key)

Year	Team	Car	1	2	3	4	5	6	7	8	9	10	Pos.	Points
2021	Abt Cupra XE	Spark ODYSSEY 21	DES; Q 8	DES; R 7	OCE; Q 3	OCE; R 5	ARC; Q 2	ARC; R 7	ISL; Q 3	ISL; R 2	JUR; Q 4	JUR; R 7	6th	87
2023	Acciona | Sainz XE Team	Spark ODYSSEY 21	DES; 1; 2	DES; 2; 1	HYD; 1; 6	HYD; 2; 4	ISL1; 1; 2	ISL1; 2; 2	ISL2; 1; 1	ISL2; 2; 9	COP; 1; 2	COP; 2; 4	2nd	144
2024	Neom McLaren Extreme E Team	Spark ODYSSEY 21	DES; 1; 2	DES; 2; 5	HYD; 1; 8	HYD; 2; 5	ISL1; 1 C	ISL1; 2 C	ISL2; 1 C	ISL2; 2 C	VAL; 1 C	VAL; 2 C	5th ^{†}	46 ^{†}

^{†} Season abandoned.

=== Complete World Rally-Raid Championship results ===
(key)

Year	Team	Car	Class	1	2	3	4	5	Pos.	Points
2023	Team Audi Sport	Audi RS Q e-tron	T1+	DAK; 9^{37}				MOR; 6^{18}	7th	77
2023	South Racing Can-Am	Maverick X3	T3		ABU; 22^{3}	SON; 8^{9}	DES; 12^{10}		7th	77
2024	Team Audi Sport	Audi RS Q e-tron	Ultimate	DAK; 48^{15}	ABU	PRT	DES		22nd	15
2024	Ford M-Sport	Ford Raptor DKR	Ultimate					MOR; Ret	22nd	15
2025	Ford M-Sport	Ford Raptor DKR	Ultimate	DAK; 3^{44}	ABU; Ret^{1}	ZAF		MOR; 5^{24}	8th	70
2025	Mattias Ekström	Maverick X3 X RS	Challenger				PRT; Ret^{1}		8th	70
2026	Ford Racing	Ford Raptor	Ultimate	DAK; 3^{52}	PRT	DES	MOR	ABU	2nd*	52*

^{*}Season still in progress.

Sporting positions
Preceded by Fredrik Ekblom	Swedish Touring Car Championship; Champion; 1999	Succeeded by Tommy Rustad
Preceded by Bernd Schneider	Deutsche Tourenwagen Masters; Champion; 2004	Succeeded by Gary Paffett
Preceded by Jean Alesi; Sébastien Loeb	Race of Champions; Nations' Cup; 2005; With: Tom Kristensen	Succeeded by Marcus Grönholm; Heikki Kovalainen
Preceded by Sébastien Loeb	Race of Champions; Champion of Champions; 2006–2007	Succeeded by Sébastien Loeb
Preceded by Bernd Schneider	Deutsche Tourenwagen Masters; Champion; 2007	Succeeded by Timo Scheider
Preceded by Sébastien Loeb	Race of Champions; Champion of Champions; 2009	Succeeded by Filipe Albuquerque
Preceded by Petter Solberg	World Rallycross Champion; 2016	Succeeded by Johan Kristoffersson
Preceded by Sébastien Loeb	Race of Champions; Champion of Champions; 2023	Succeeded by Incumbent
