= Per-Gunnar Andersson (racing driver) =

Swedish racing driver (born 1957)

Per-Gunnar "Peggen" Andersson (born 15 August 1957) is a racing driver from Falkenberg, Sweden.

Andersson started his career in Sweden in 1980. In 1988, he won the Thai Touring Car Championship and the Swedish Touring Car Championship. He won the Swedish championship again in 1989, 1991 and 1992. In the 1980s, Andersson also competed in DTM and the British Touring Car Championship.

In 1993 and 1995, Andersson won the Nordic Touring Car Championship. Since then, he has returned to Swedish touring cars, finishing his career at the end of 2001 after driving for Carly BMW in the European Touring Car Championship.

Today, Andersson works as a commentator in the Swedish broadcast of DTM for Canal+.

== Racing record ==
=== Complete European Touring Car Championship results ===
(key) (Races in bold indicate pole position) (Races in italics indicate fastest lap)

Year	Team	Car	1	2	3	4	5	6	7	8	9	10	11	DC	Points
1982	(Sweden) Sportpromotion AB	Volvo 240 Turbo	MNZ	VAL	DON	PER	MUG	BRN	SAL	NUR	SPA	SIL; Ret	ZOL	NC	0

=== Complete Deutsche Tourenwagen Meisterschaft results ===
(key) (Races in bold indicate pole position) (Races in italics indicate fastest lap)

Year	Team	Car	1	2	3	4	5	6	7	8	9	10	11	12	13	14	15	16	17	18	19	20	21	22	23	24	Pos.	Pts
1984	ML Racing Sybilla	Volvo 240 Turbo	ZOL	HOC	AVU	AVU	MFA	WUN	NÜR	NÜR	NOR	NÜR	DIE	HOC; 2	HOC; 27	ZOL	NÜR; 4										NC	0
1985	M & L Racing Sweden	Volvo 240 Turbo	ZOL; 4	WUN; 3	AVU	MFA; 8	ERD; 1	ERD; Ret	DIE; 6	DIE; 12	**ZOL**; 18	SIE; 4	NÜR; 11														7th	86
1986	Team Beckers	Volvo 240 Turbo	ZOL; 2	HOC; 1	NÜR; 5	AVU; DSQ	MFA; Ret	WUN; 5	NÜR; Ret	ZOL	NÜR; 10																8th	75
1992	BMW Sweden	BMW M3 Sport Evo	ZOL; 1	ZOL; 2	NÜR; 1	NÜR; 2	WUN; 1	WUN; 2	AVU; 1	AVU; 2	HOC; 1	HOC; 2	NÜR; 1	NÜR; 2	NOR; 1; 18	NOR; 2; 14	BRN; 1	BRN; 2	DIE; 1 Ret	DIE; 2 Ret	ALE; 1	ALE; 2	NÜR; 1	NÜR; 2	HOC; 1	HOC; 2	NC	0

=== Complete British Touring Car Championship results ===
(key) (Races in bold indicate pole position) (Races in italics indicate fastest lap)

Year	Team	Car	Class	1	2	3	4	5	6	7	8	9	10	11	12	13	14	15	16	17	Pos.	Pts	Class
1990	BMW Team Sweden	BMW M3	B	OUL	DON ovr:9‡ cls:4‡	THR	SIL	OUL	SIL	BRH ovr:7‡ cls:4‡	SNE	BRH	BIR	DON	THR	SIL					NC	0	NC
1991	BMW Team Sweden	BMW M3		SIL; 8	SNE; 8	DON; 12	THR	SIL; 11	BRH	SIL	DON; 1	DON; 2	OUL	BRH; 1	BRH; 2	DON	THR	SIL			19th	6	
1993	Peggen Motorsport	BMW M3		SIL; Ret	DON; Ret	SNE	DON	OUL	BRH; 1	BRH; 2	PEM	SIL	KNO; 1	KNO; 2	OUL	BRH	THR	DON; 1	DON; 2	SIL	NC	0	

‡ Endurance driver (Ineligible for points in 1990)

=== Complete Swedish Touring Car Championship results ===
(key) (Races in bold indicate pole position) (Races in italics indicate fastest lap)

Year	Team	Car	1	2	3	4	5	6	7	8	9	10	11	12	13	14	15	16	DC	Pts
1997	Team Becker Schauman Wood	BMW 318is	MAN; 1; 9	**MAN**; **2** Ret	KIN; 1; 3	KIN; 2; 3	AND; 1; 4	AND; 2; 3	FAL; 1; 6	FAL; 2; 2	KNU; 1; 2	KNU; 2; 10	KAR; 1; 4	KAR; 2; 5					4th	151
1998	BMW Dealer Team	BMW 320i	MAN; 1 Ret	MAN; 2; 4	KAR; 1; 4	KAR; 2; 1	AND; 1 Ret	AND; 2; 1	FAL; 1 Ret	FAL; 2 Ret	KNU; 1; 2	KNU; 2; 5	MAN; 1; 4	MAN; 2; 9					3rd	137
1999	BMW Dealer Team	BMW 320i	MAN; 1; 7	MAN; 2; 9	KNU; 1; 4	KNU; 2; 14	KAR; 1; 8	KAR; 2; 4	AND; 1 Ret	AND; 2 Ret	FAL; 1; 12	FAL; 2; 13	AND; 1; 6	AND; 2; 9	ARC; 1; 14	ARC; 2; 15	MAN; 1; 6	MAN; 2 Ret	11th	49
2000	BMW Dealer Team	BMW 320i	KAR; 1; 11	KAR; 2 DNS	KNU; 1; 8	KNU; 2; 3	MAN; 1; 10	MAN; 2 Ret	FAL; 1; 4	FAL; 2 Ret	AND; 1; 8	AND; 2; 13	ARC; 1	ARC; 2	KAR; 1; 10	KAR; 2; 6	MAN; 1; 6	MAN; 2; 13	9th	36

=== Complete European Super Production Championship results ===
(key) (Races in bold indicate pole position) (Races in italics indicate fastest lap)

Year	Team	Car	1	2	3	4	5	6	7	8	9	10	DC	Pts
2001	Carly Motorsport	BMW 320i	MNZ; 5	BRN; Ret	MAG; 5	SIL; 13	ZOL; 4	HUN; 4	A1R; 8	NÜR; 9	JAR; 9	EST; 8	7th	46
