= Jens Edman =

Swedish auto racing driver (born 1976)

Jens Edman (born 28 December 1976, in Ankarsrum) is a Swedish auto racing driver.

== Career ==
Most of Edman's career has been spent in Touring car racing, including the Swedish Touring Car Championship, with a best season finish of third in 2001 driving for Flash Engineering in a Volvo S40. More recently he has competed in the Danish Touring Car Championship, where he also ended the year in third, in the 2005 season. In 2006, he entered selected rounds of the FIA World Touring Car Championship with a Peugeot 407 for Peugeot Sport Denmark. In 2009, Edman returned to racing back home in Sweden, for Dealer Sport Saab Performance in the STCC.

=== Complete WTCC results ===
(key) (Races in bold indicate pole position) (Races in italics indicate fastest lap)

Year	Team	Car	1		2	3	4		5	6	7	8	9	10	Position	Points
2006	Peugeot Sport Denmark	Peugeot 407	MNZ		MGN	BRA	OSC		CUR	PUE	BRN	IST	VAL	MAC	NC	0
2006	Peugeot Sport Denmark	Peugeot 407	Ret	DNS			20	20							NC	0
