= Anderstorp Raceway =

Motorsport track in Sweden

- Grand Prix Circuit (1998–present)
- Location: Anderstorp, Sweden
- Coordinates: 57°15′51″N 13°36′5″E
- FIA Grade: 2 (Note: Anderstorp Raceway's Grade 2 license expired 28 May 2021.)
- Opened: 16 June 1968; 58 years ago
- Former names: Scandinavian Raceway
- Major events: Current: PCC Scandinavia (2005–2007, 2015–present); Former: Formula One; Swedish Grand Prix (1973–1978); Grand Prix motorcycle racing Swedish motorcycle Grand Prix (1971–1977, 1981–1990); GT4 Scandinavia (2019, 2021–2023); WTCC Race of Sweden (2007); World SBK (1991, 1993); FIM EWC (1993); Sidecar World Championship (1981–1990, 1993, 1997); STCC (1997–2000, 2005–2007, 2015–2022); FIA GT (2002–2003); ETCC (1985–1987, 2002–2003)
- Website: https://www.srwanderstorp.se/sv/, https://www.srwanderstorp.se/en/

Grand Prix Circuit (1998–present)
- Length: 4.025 km (2.501 mi)
- Turns: 8
- Race lap record: 1:21.525 ( (Netherlands) Marijn van Kalmthout, Benetton B197, 2009, EuroBOSS/F1)

Grand Prix Circuit (1978–1997)
- Length: 4.031 km (2.505 mi)
- Turns: 8
- Race lap record: 1:24.836 ( (Austria) Niki Lauda, Brabham BT46B, 1978, F1)

Grand Prix Circuit (1975–1977)
- Length: 4.018 km (2.497 mi)
- Turns: 8
- Race lap record: 1:27.607 ( (United States) Mario Andretti, Lotus 78, 1977, F1)

Original Grand Prix Circuit (1968–1974)
- Length: 4.025 km (2.501 mi)
- Turns: 8
- Race lap record: 1:26.146 ( (New Zealand) Denny Hulme, McLaren M23, 1973, F1)

Anderstorp Raceway, previously known as Scandinavian Raceway, is a 4.025 km (2.501 mi) motorsport race track in Anderstorp (Gislaved Municipality), Sweden and the sole Nordic host of a Formula One World Championship Grand Prix, when the Swedish Grand Prix was held for six years between 1973 and 1978.

== Track history ==
The track was built on marshlands in 1968 and became an extremely popular venue in the 1970s, just as Swede Ronnie Peterson was at the height of his career. It has a long straight (called Flight Straight, which is also used as an aircraft runway), as well as several banked corners, making car setup an engineering compromise. Unusually, the pit lane is located halfway round the lap.

The raceway hosted six Formula One Swedish Grand Prix events in the 1970s. When Peterson and Gunnar Nilsson died during the 1978 Formula One season, public support for the event dried up and the Swedish Grand Prix came to an end. The circuit is also noteworthy because it was the site of the first and only win of two unconventional F1 cars: the six-wheeled Tyrrell P34 car in 1976 and the infamous Brabham 'fan car' in 1978.

Anderstorp also hosted the Swedish motorcycle Grand Prix in 1971–1977 and 1981–1990, the European Touring Car Championship in 1985–1987, the Superbike World Championship in 1991 and 1993, and the FIA GT Championship in 2002 and 2003.

In 1993, the circuit along with FIM organized a 24-hour motorcycle race. Just one week ahead of the race, an appeal was lodged against the permit for the competition, due to noise concerns. Although the organizers obtained permission to race on the morning of the event, "media had trumpeted that the competition was canceled. At the ferry berths in Skåne, passport staff turned away visitors from Denmark and the continent". During the race itself a heavy thunderstorm occurred, with torrential rain drowning the circuit. Although racing continued, no local or international audience showed up, and the circuit was forced to declare bankruptcy after the event.

The FIA World Touring Car Championship (WTCC) returned to Anderstorp in 2007, replacing the Istanbul Park in Turkey on the WTCC calendar. For the 2008 season however, it was replaced by the Imola Circuit.

International motorsport was due to return to Anderstorp in 2020 with a round of the DTM. Then, it was cancelled due to COVID-19 pandemic.

== Events ==
Current

- May: Porsche Carrera Cup Scandinavia, Formula Nordic, Anderstorp Race Festival
- September: SM-Final

Former

- BPR Global GT Series (1995–1996)
- EuroBOSS Series (2009)
- European Formula 5000 Championship (1970)
- European Touring Car Championship (1985–1987, 2002–2003)
- FIA European Formula 3 Cup (1975)
- FIA GT Championship (2002–2003)
- FIA Sportscar Championship (1998)
- FIM Endurance World Championship (1993)
- Formula 750 (1973, 1975)
- Formula One
  - Swedish Grand Prix (1973–1978)
- Formula Renault 2000 Eurocup (2002)
- Formula Renault V6 Eurocup (2003)
- Grand Prix motorcycle racing
  - Swedish motorcycle Grand Prix (1971–1977, 1981–1990)
- GT4 Scandinavia (2019, 2021–2023)
- International Formula Master (2007)
- Nordic 4 Championship (2023, 2025)
- Scandinavian Touring Car Championship (1997–2000, 2005–2007, 2015–2022)
- Sidecar World Championship (1981–1990, 1993, 1997)
- SMP F4 Championship (2016)
- Superbike World Championship (1991, 1993)
- TTA – Racing Elite League (2012)
- World Touring Car Championship
  - FIA WTCC Race of Sweden (2007)

== Layout modifications ==
The circuit has been modified at least 4 times in its history. The chicane in Norra corner has been added sometime in 1975 before the 1975 Swedish Grand Prix. The chicane has been re-aligned and tightened in time for the 1976 Swedish Grand Prix. It had been modified again before the final Formula One Grand Prix run on the circuit (1978 Swedish Grand Prix), with modifications to the penultimate Norra corner^{[N 2]} and slight re-orientation of the following straight, which resulted in the length increase from 4.018 km (2.497 mi) to 4.031 km (2.505 mi). It remained in that configuration through the 1980s until sometime between 1997 and 1998 it was modified again and slightly shortened to its present-day length of 4.025 km (2.501 mi).

Track variations:

- 4.025 km (2.501 mi) – 1968–1974
- 4.018 km (2.497 mi) – 1975–1977
- 4.031 km (2.505 mi) – 1978–1997
- 4.025 km (2.501 mi) – 1998–present

== Lap records ==
As of May 2026, the fastest official race lap records at the Anderstorp Raceway are listed as:

Category	Time	Driver	Vehicle	Event	Circuit Map
Grand Prix Circuit: 4.025 km (2.501 mi) (1998–present)
EuroBOSS/F1	1:21.525	(Netherlands) Marijn van Kalmthout	Benetton B197-Judd V10	2009 EuroBOSS Anderstorp Super Prix	
WSC	1:24.920	(France) Emmanuel Collard	Ferrari 333 SP	1998 Anderstorp International Sports Racing Series round	
International Formula Master	1:26.094	(Denmark) Kasper Andersen	Tatuus N.T07	2007 Anderstorp International Formula Master round	
Formula Renault 3.5	1:26.489	(Argentina) José María López	Tatuus FRV6	2003 Anderstorp Formula Renault V6 Eurocup round	
Formula Three	1:31.044	(Sweden) Thed Björk	Dallara F394	1999 Anderstorp Nordic F3 round	
GT1 (GTS)	1:31.424	(Austria) Walter Lechner	Saleen S7-R	2003 FIA GT Anderstorp 500km	
Formula 4	1:31.449	(Netherlands) Richard Verschoor	Tatuus F4-T014	2016 Anderstorp SMP F4 round	
Formula Renault 2.0	1:31.679	(Sweden) Daniel Roos	Tatuus FR2000	2009 Anderstorp Formula Renault 2.0 Sweden round	
Porsche Carrera Cup	1:32.604	(Sweden) Lukas Sundahl	Porsche 911 (992 I) GT3 Cup	2022 2nd Anderstorp Porsche Carrera Cup Scandinavia round	
GT3	1:32.902	(Sweden) Fredrik Lestrup	BMW Z4 GT3	2012 Anderstorp Swedish GT round	
N-GT	1:34.081	(Italy) Andrea Bertolini	Ferrari 360 Modena GT	2003 FIA GT Anderstorp 500km	
Silhouette racing car	1:34.274	(Sweden) Johan Kristoffersson	SEAT León STCC	2016 Anderstorp STCC round	
GT2	1:34.830	(Germany) Elmar Grimm	Porsche 911 (993) GT2	2001 Anderstorp Nordic Challenge	
GT4	1:36.340	(Denmark) Lærke Rønn Sørensen	Porsche 718 Cayman GT4 RS Clubsport	2025 Anderstorp Porsche Sprint Challenge Scandinavia round	
Super Touring	1:37.057	(Norway) Tommy Rustad	Nissan Primera GT	1999 1st Anderstorp STCC round	
Formula Renault 1.6	1:37.408	(Sweden) Hampus Varis	Signatech FR1.6	2026 Anderstorp Formula Nordic round	
TCR Touring Car	1:38.247	(Sweden) Robert Dahlgren	CUPRA León Competición TCR	2021 Anderstorp STCC round	
Super 2000	1:39.945	(Italy) Nicola Larini	Alfa Romeo 156 GTA Super 2000	2003 Anderstorp ETCC round	
Ferrari Challenge	1:43.080	(Sweden) Kari Mäkinen	Ferrari 360 Modena Challenge	2001 Anderstorp Nordic Challenge	
Grand Prix Circuit: 4.031 km (2.505 mi) (1978–1997)
Formula One	1:24.836	(Austria) Niki Lauda	Brabham BT46B	1978 Swedish Grand Prix	
Formula Three	1:29.846	(Sweden) Peter Åslund	Ralt RT35	1992 Anderstorp Swedish F3 round	
GT1	1:30.344	(France) Jean-Marc Gounon	Ferrari F40 LM	1996 BPR 4 Hours of Anderstorp	
500cc	1:31.107	(United States) Wayne Rainey	Yamaha YZR500	1990 Swedish motorcycle Grand Prix	
World SBK	1:33.480	(United Kingdom) Carl Fogarty	Ducati 888 SBK	1993 Anderstorp World SBK round	
250cc	1:34.833	(United States) John Kocinski	Yamaha TZ 250	1990 Swedish motorcycle Grand Prix	
Super Touring	1:40.113	(Sweden) Mattias Ekström	Volvo 850 GLT	1997 Anderstorp STCC round	
125cc	1:41.909	(West Germany) Stefan Prein	Honda RS125R	1990 Swedish motorcycle Grand Prix	
Group A	1:44.564	(United Kingdom) Tom Walkinshaw	Rover Vitesse	1986 Anderstorp ETCC round	
Grand Prix Circuit: 4.018 km (2.497 mi) (1975–1977)
Formula One	1:27.607	(United States) Mario Andretti	Lotus 78	1977 Swedish Grand Prix	
Formula Three	1:36.314	(Sweden) Conny Ljungfeldt	March 743	1975 Anderstorp European F3 round	
500cc	1:39.802	(United Kingdom) Barry Sheene	Suzuki RG 500	1977 Swedish motorcycle Grand Prix	
350cc	1:42.281	(South Africa) Kork Ballington	Yamaha TZ 350	1977 Swedish motorcycle Grand Prix	
250cc	1:46.285	(United Kingdom) Mick Grant	Kawasaki KR250	1977 Swedish motorcycle Grand Prix	
125cc	1:49.263	(Italy) Pier Paolo Bianchi	Morbidelli 125	1976 Swedish motorcycle Grand Prix	
50cc	1:58.444	(Spain) Ángel Nieto	Bultaco TSS 50	1976 Swedish motorcycle Grand Prix	
Original Grand Prix Circuit: 4.025 km (2.501 mi) (1968–1974)
Formula One	1:26.146	(New Zealand) Denny Hulme	McLaren M23	1973 Swedish Grand Prix	
Group 6	1:31.300	(Finland) Leo Kinnunen	Porsche 908/02	1969 Anderstorp Nordic Challenge Cup round	
Formula 5000	1:31.900	(United Kingdom) Peter Gethin	McLaren M10B	1970 Anderstorp F5000 round	
Sports 2000	1:35.500	(Sweden) Jo Bonnier	Lola T210	1970 Anderstorp European 2-Litre Championship round	
Group 4	1:38.400	(Sweden) Ulf Norinder	Lola T70 Mk.IIIB GT	1969 Anderstorp Sports Prototype race	
Formula Three	1:38.800	(Sweden) Håkan Dahlqvist	Merlyn MK 21	1972 Anderstorp Swedish F3 round	
500cc	1:44.300	(Finland) Teuvo Länsivuori	Yamaha YZR500	1974 Swedish motorcycle Grand Prix	
350cc	1:44.500	(France) Patrick Pons	Yamaha TZ 350	1974 Swedish motorcycle Grand Prix	
Group 2	1:44.520	(Sweden) Bo Emanuelsson	Ford Escort RS 1600	1973 Swedish Grand Prix GT support race	
250cc	1:47.700	(Japan) Takazumi Katayama	Yamaha TZ 250	1974 Swedish motorcycle Grand Prix	
Group 3	1:49.100	(Sweden) Bengt Ekberg	Porsche 911 S	1972 Anderstorp Swedish Sportscar round	
125cc	1:52.000	(Sweden) Kent Andersson	Yamaha TA 125	1974 Swedish motorcycle Grand Prix	
50cc	2:01.000	(Netherlands) Henk van Kessel	Kreidler 50 GP	1974 Swedish motorcycle Grand Prix	

== Airfield ==
Anderstorp Airfield
- IATA: none; ICAO: ESMP

Summary
- Airport type: Private
- Opened: 1968
- Elevation AMSL: 155 m (509 ft)
- Website: www.srwanderstorp.se/en/airfield/
- Interactive map of Anderstorp Airfield

Runways
Direction	Length		Surface
Direction	ft	m	Surface
04/22		1,000	Asphalt

In order to get more financiers the long straight was adopted as a 1,000 m (3,300 ft) runway for small aircraft (ICAO: ESMP). It is as of 2022 open for aircraft operations. There is also a helipad, planned for ambulance helicopters at racing accidents.

== Notes ==
^[N 2] Contrary to common depiction of the 1978 modification as having a chicane introduced to the Norra corner, there was no chicane ever used: the corner was made slower by decreasing its radius and making it a sharper bend instead of a sweeping curve it was before.
