= Arctic Circle Raceway =

Racetrack in Norway

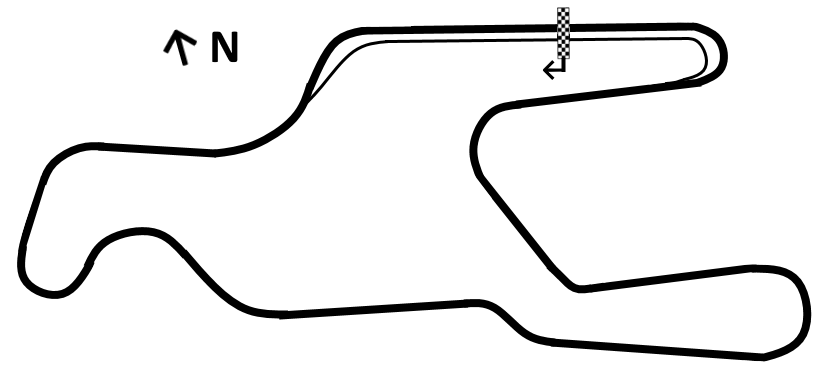
- Full Circuit (1995–present)
- Location: Mo i Rana, Norway
- Coordinates: 66°25′25.68″N 14°26′47.4″E
- Broke ground: 1990
- Opened: 12 August 1995; 30 years ago
- Major events: Current: Arctic Circle Midnight Cup (2021–present); Former: STCC (1999–2001, 2004); NTCC (1997, 2002–2004)

Full Circuit (1995–present)
- Length: 3.753 km (2.332 mi)
- Turns: 12
- Race lap record: 1:20.693 ( (Sweden) Pontus Mörth, Ralt RT33, 1996, F3)

Arctic Circle Raceway is a motor racing circuit in Norway. It is 25 km (16 mi) north of Mo i Rana, 30-kilometre (19 mi) south of the Arctic Circle. It supports 24-hour racing in full daylight in summer due to the midnight sun. It is the northernmost racetrack in the world.

== Circuit information ==
The venue was opened on 12 August 1995. The racetrack cost US$10 million to build. It hosted a round of the Swedish Touring Car Championship from 1999 to 2001 and again in 2004. Currently it hosts a non-championship round of the NBF GT Championship, titled as the 'Arctic Circle Midnight Cup'.

- Racetrack
  - Length: 3.753 km (2.332 mi)
  - Width: 11–13 m (36.09–42.65 ft)
  - Longest straight: 493 m (0.31 mi)
  - Pitlane: 725 m (0.45 mi)
  - Height difference: 31 m (101.71 ft), drop 8.6%
  - Height above the sea: 200 m (660 ft)
  - Depot area: 48,400 m^{2} (57,900 sq yd)

== Lap records ==
=== Unofficial lap records ===
  - Superbike: Daniel Kubberød, Superbike, 1.28.1 (July 2009)
  - Formula 3: Pontus Mörth, Formel 3, 1.20.624 (June 1996)
  - Touring car: Jan «Flash» Nilsson, stcc, Volvo 1:27.323 (August 2000)
  - Streetcars: Lars Magnussen Mitsubishi Evo 1:29.8 (September 2014)
  - Running: Lars Kristian Granlund 13:08 (October 2019)

=== Official lap records ===
As of August 2004, the fastest official race lap records at the Arctic Circle Raceway are listed as:

Category	Time	Driver	Vehicle	Event
Full Circuit (1995–present): 3.753 km (2.332 mi)
Formula Three	1:20.693	Pontus Mörth	Ralt RT33	1996 Mo i Rana Nordic F3 round
GT1 (GTS)	1:27.455	Henrik Roos	Chrysler Viper GTS-R	2001 Mo i Rana Swedish GTR round
Super Touring	1.28.068	Tommy Rustad	Nissan Primera GT	1999 Mo i Rana STCC round
Super 2000	1.33.301	Richard Göransson	BMW 320i	2004 Mo i Rana STCC round
