= Oscar Wurz =

Austrian racing driver (born 2007)

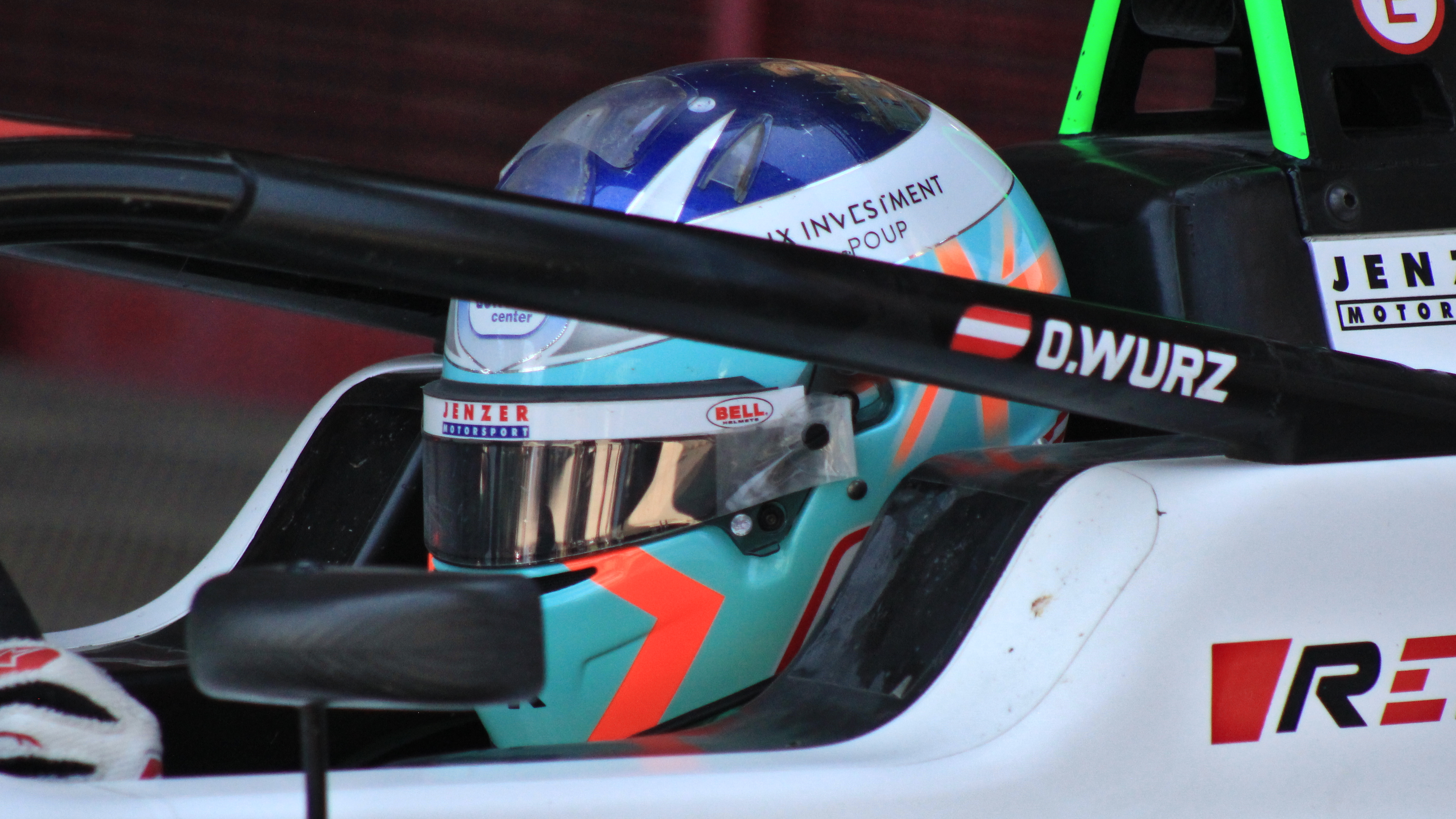
- Wurz in 2024
- Nationality: Austria
- Born: 29 September 2007 (age 19)
- Relatives: Alexander Wurz (father); Charlie Wurz (brother)

Super Formula Lights career
- Debut season: 2026
- Current team: TOM'S
- Car number: 36
- Starts: 18
- Wins: 0
- Podiums: 1
- Poles: 0
- Fastest laps: 0
- Best finish: 8th in 2026

Previous series
- 2025; 2025; 2024; 2024; 2023; 2023: Eurocup-3; Eurocup-3 Winter; F4 CEZ; F4 Saudi Arabian; F4 Saudi Arabian– Trophy Event; F4 Danish

Championship titles
- 2024: F4 CEZ
- Statistics up to date as of 18 September 2026.

Oscar Wurz (born 29 September 2007) is an Austrian racing driver who last competed in the Super Formula Lights for TOM'S.

Wurz last drove for Drivex in Eurocup-3 and is the 2024 Formula 4 CEZ champion, driving for Jenzer Motorsport.

== Career ==
=== Karting ===
Wurz began karting on the national stage when he joined the Hungarian International Open in 2016, driving in the Micro Max category. He then debuted internationally in 2018, at the Rotax Max Challenge Grand Finals in Brazil, in the Micro Max category. His most major title also came in 2018 when he won the Hungarian championship in the same category, finishing above talented drivers including Sasha Bondarev. Most recently in 2022, Wurz competed in OK karting with a best finish of 9th in the Italian championship.

=== Formula 4 ===
==== 2023 ====
Wurz stepped up to car racing as he joined STEP Motorsport for the final two rounds of the 2023 F4 Danish Championship. He secured a podium as he scored 52 points from six races, finishing 12th in the standings. Wurz ended the year in the Trophy Event of the 2024 F4 Saudi Arabian Championship, held before the start of the season. He finished on the top step of the podium twice, scoring a further podium from the four races.

==== 2024 ====
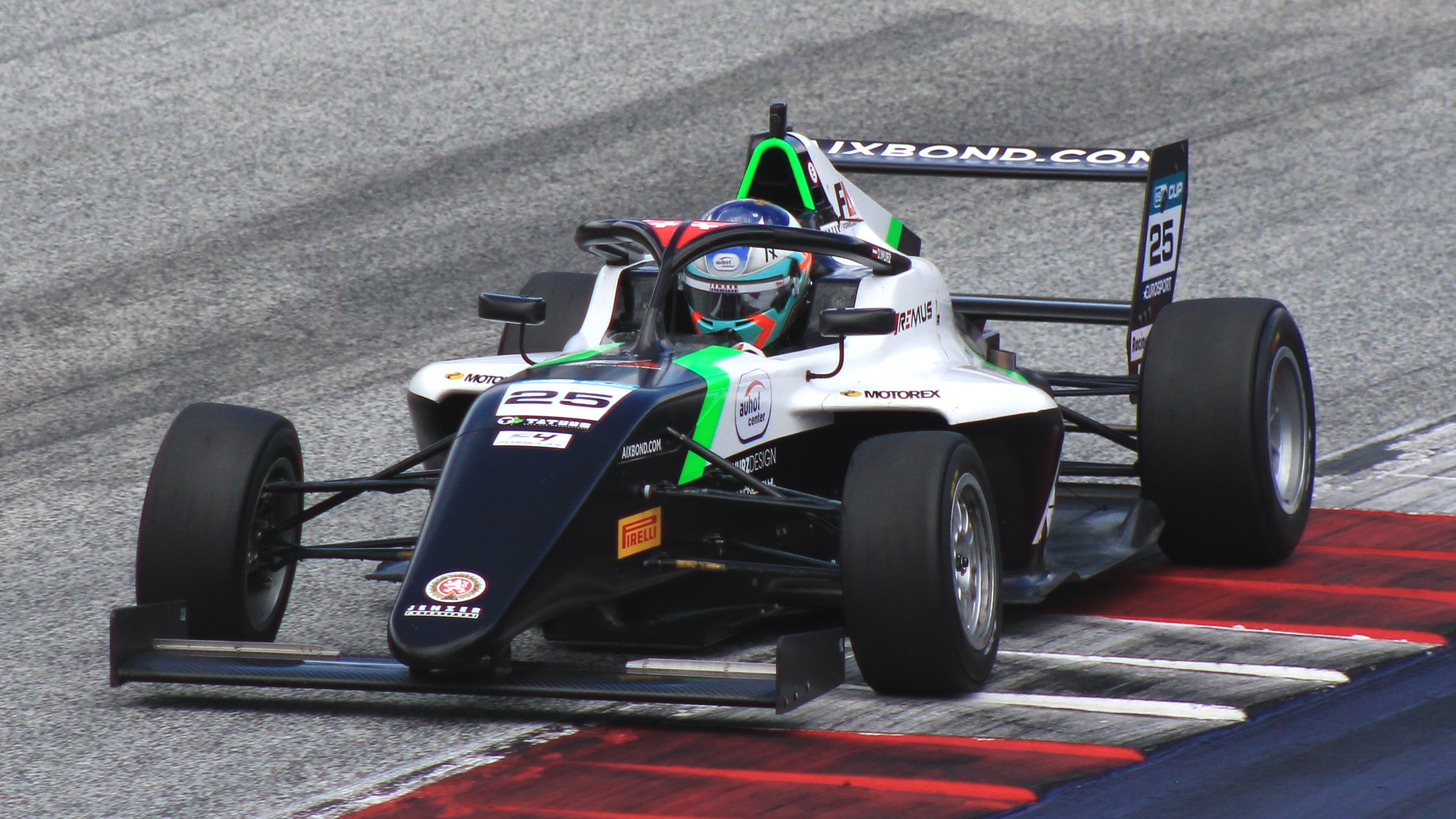
Wurz racing at the Red Bull Ring during the 2024 Formula 4 CEZ Championship

For 2024, Wurz would join the full season of the 2024 F4 Saudi Arabian Championship. He managed four podiums from 19 races, and finished fifth in the championship as he prepared for the season ahead. Wurz would then secure a place on the grid for the 2024 Formula 4 CEZ Championship. He began the season with two victories from three races, inheriting the first two victories from Ethan Ischer who competed as a guest driver at the Balaton Park Circuit. Wurz then secured another podium at round two at the Red Bull Ring, and scored another two victories and a further second place in round three at the Slovakia Ring. After more consistency, although Wurz failed to register another victory, Wurz scored seven more podiums after the round in Slovakia and as a result beat Kirill Kutskov to the title, and helped his Jenzer Motorsport team to the teams' title.

=== Formula Regional ===
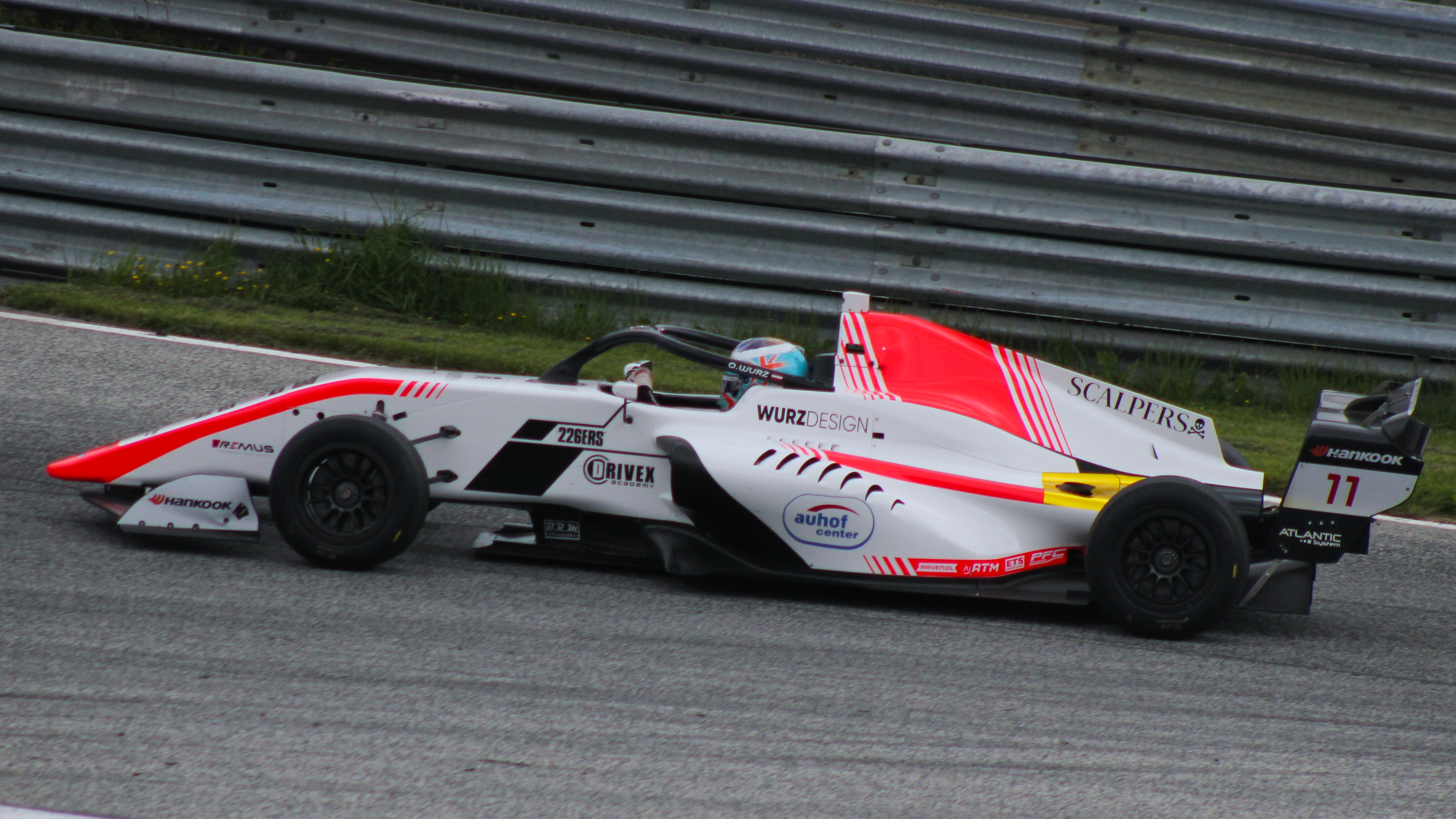
Wurz driving at the Red Bull Ring during the 2025 Eurocup-3 season

After his successful season in the Formula 4 CEZ Championship, Wurz was announced to be making the step up to Formula Regional, driving for Spanish team Drivex in the 2025 Eurocup-3 season. He also drove for the team in the Eurocup-3 Spanish Winter Championship. He is currently 13th in the standings with 19 points, his best finish being fourth in the second race at Portimão.

=== Super Formula Lights ===
In 2026, Wurz left Europe and moved to Japan to compete in the Super Formula Lights with TOM'S.

== Personal life ==
Wurz's brother Charlie last competed in the 2025 FIA Formula 3 Championship with Trident, and their father Alexander is a former Formula One driver.

== Karting record ==
=== Karting career summary ===
| Season | Series | Team | Position |
|---|---|---|---|
| 2016 | Hungarian International Open - Micro Max | Speedworld Academy | 24th |
| 2017 | BNL Golden Trophy - Micro Max | | 7th |
| 2017 | Hungarian International Open - Micro Max | VPD Racing | 14th |
| 2018 | Rotax Max Challenge Grand Finals - Micro Max | Wurz Racing | 20th |
| 2018 | FIA Central European Zone - Micro Max | Wurz Racing | 3rd |
| 2018 | Hungarian International Open - Micro Max | Wurz Racing | 1st |
| 2019 | WSK Champions Cup - 60 Mini | Wurz Racing | NC |
| 2019 | South Garda Winter Cup - Mini Rok | Manetti Motorsport | 26th |
| 2019 | WSK Super Master Series - 60 Mini | Manetti Motorsport | 106th |
| 2019 | Rotax Max Challenge International Trophy - Mini Max | | 29th |
| 2019 | FIA Central European Zone - Mini Max | VPDR | 7th |
| 2019 | Austrian Karting-Meisterschaft - Mini Max | VPDR | 7th |
| 2019 | WSK Open Cup - 60 Mini | KR Motorsport | 101st |
| 2019 | WSK Final Cup - 60 Mini | KR Motorsport | NC |
| 2019 | Canadian Open - Mini Max | | 4th |
| 2020 | WSK Super Master Series - OKJ | Expirit Racing Team | 66th |
| 2020 | South Garda Winter Cup - OKJ | Expirit Racing Team | NC |
| 2020 | WSK Euro Series - OKJ | Expirit Racing Team | 49th |
| 2020 | Champions of the Future - OKJ | Expirit Racing Team | NC |
| 2020 | CIK-FIA European Championship - OKJ | Expirit Racing Team | 83rd |
| 2020 | CIK-FIA World Championship - OKJ | Expirit Racing Team | NC |
| 2020 | WSK Open Cup - OKJ | Expirit Racing Team | 40th |
| 2020 | CIK-FIA Academy Trophy | | 19th |
| 2021 | WSK Champions Cup - OKJ | Expirit Racing Team | NC |
| 2021 | WSK Super Master Series - OKJ | Expirit Racing Team | 47th |
| 2021 | WSK Euro Series - OKJ | Expirit Racing Team | 37th |
| 2021 | Champions of the Future - OKJ | Expirit Racing Team | 61st |
| 2021 | CIK-FIA European Championship - OKJ | Expirit Racing Team | 62nd |
| 2021 | WSK Open Cup - OKJ | Expirit Racing Team | 35th |
| 2021 | Deutsche Kart Meisterschaft - OKJ | Ricky Flynn Motorsport | 45th |
| 2021 | CIK-FIA Academy Trophy | | 14th |
| 2021 | CIK-FIA World Championship - OKJ | Tony Kart Racing Team | 24th |
| 2021 | South Garda Winter Cup - OKJ | Tony Kart Racing Team | 15th |
| 2022 | WSK Super Master Series - OK | Tony Kart Racing Team | 76th |
| 2022 | Champions of the Future - OK | Tony Kart Racing Team | 63rd |
| 2022 | CIK-FIA European Championship - OK | Tony Kart Racing Team | 59th |
| 2022 | WSK Euro Series - OK | Tony Kart Racing Team | 56th |
| 2022 | CIK-FIA World Championship - OK | Tony Kart Racing Team | NC |
| 2022 | Italian ACI Championship - OK | | 9th |

== Racing record ==
=== Racing career summary ===
| Season | Series | Team | Races | Wins | Poles | F/Laps | Podiums | Points | Position |
|---|---|---|---|---|---|---|---|---|---|
| 2023 | F4 Danish Championship | STEP Motorsport | 6 | 0 | 0 | 0 | 1 | 52 | 12th |
| 2023 | Formula Nordic | STEP Motorsport | 3 | 0 | 0 | 0 | 1 | 0 | NC† |
| 2023 | F4 Saudi Arabian Championship – Trophy Event | Altawkilat.Meritus GP | 8 | 2 | 0 | 1 | 4 | —N/a | NC |
| 2024 | F4 Saudi Arabian Championship | Altawkilat.Meritus GP | 15 | 0 | 0 | 0 | 3 | 106.5 | 5th |
| 2024 | Formula 4 CEZ Championship | Jenzer Motorsport | 18 | 4 | 1 | 6 | 14 | 301 | **1st** |
| 2024 | Italian F4 Championship | Jenzer Motorsport | 3 | 0 | 0 | 0 | 0 | 0 | 47th |
| 2024 | F4 Spanish Championship | Drivex | 3 | 0 | 0 | 0 | 0 | 0 | 29th |
| 2024 | F4 Spanish Championship | Saintéloc Racing | 2 | 0 | 0 | 0 | 0 | 0 | 29th |
| 2024 | FIA Motorsport Games Formula 4 Cup | Team Austria | 2 | 0 | 0 | 0 | 0 | —N/a | DNF |
| 2025 | Eurocup-3 Spanish Winter Championship | Drivex | 8 | 0 | 0 | 0 | 0 | 20 | 14th |
| 2025 | Eurocup-3 | Drivex | 16 | 0 | 0 | 0 | 0 | 6 | 18th |
| 2025 | Macau Grand Prix | Evans GP | 1 | 0 | 0 | 0 | 0 | —N/a | DNF |
| 2026 | Super Formula Lights | TOM'S | 18 | 0 | 0 | 0 | 1 | 19.5 | 8th |
| 2026 | Eurocup-3 | Drivex | 2 | 0 | 0 | 0 | 0 | 0 | NC† |

† As Wurz was a guest driver, he was ineligible for points

=== Complete F4 Danish Championship results ===
(key) (Races in bold indicate pole position) (Races in italics indicate fastest lap)

| Year | Team | 1 | 2 | 3 | 4 | 5 | 6 | 7 | 8 | 9 | 10 | 11 | 12 | 13 | 14 | 15 | 16 | 17 | 18 | DC | Points |
|---|---|---|---|---|---|---|---|---|---|---|---|---|---|---|---|---|---|---|---|---|---|
| 2023 | FSP Racing | PAD1; 1 | PAD1; 2 | PAD1; 3 | AND; 1 | AND; 2 | KAR; 1 | KAR; 2 | KAR; 3 | DJU; 1 | DJU; 2 | DJU; 3 | DJU; 4 | PAD2; 1; 7 | PAD2; 2; 6 | PAD2; 3; 8 | JYL; 1; 5 | JYL; 2; 2 | JYL; 3; 7 | 12th | 52 |

=== Complete F4 Saudi Arabian Championship results ===
(key) (Races in bold indicate pole position; races in italics indicate fastest lap)

| Year | Team | 1 | 2 | 3 | 4 | 5 | 6 | 7 | 8 | 9 | 10 | 11 | 12 | 13 | 14 | 15 | 16 | 17 | DC | Points |
|---|---|---|---|---|---|---|---|---|---|---|---|---|---|---|---|---|---|---|---|---|
| 2024 | Altawkilat Meritus.GP | KMT1; 1 Ret | KMT1; 2 Ret | KMT1; 3; 4 | KMT1; 4 DNS | LSL; 1; 2 | LSL; 2; 3 | LSL; 3; 4 | LSL; 4; 5 | JED1; 1; 4 | JED1; 2 WD | JED1; 3; 4 | JED2; 1; 2 | JED2; 2 Ret | JED2; 3 Ret | JED3; 1; 6 | JED3; 2; 5 | JED3; 3; 8 | 5th | 106.5 |

=== Complete Formula 4 CEZ Championship results ===
(key) (Races in bold indicate pole position; races in italics indicate fastest lap)

| Year | Team | 1 | 2 | 3 | 4 | 5 | 6 | 7 | 8 | 9 | 10 | 11 | 12 | 13 | 14 | 15 | 16 | 17 | 18 | DC | Points |
|---|---|---|---|---|---|---|---|---|---|---|---|---|---|---|---|---|---|---|---|---|---|
| 2024 | Jenzer Motorsport | BAL; 1; 2 | BAL; 2; 2 | BAL; 3; 2 | RBR; 1; 5 | RBR; 2; 8 | RBR; 3; 2 | **SVK**; **1**; 1 | SVK; 2; 1 | SVK; 3; 2 | MOS; 1; 3 | MOS; 2; 8† | MOS; 3; 3 | BRN; 1; 5 | BRN; 2; 2 | BRN; 3; 2 | SAL; 1; 2 | SAL; 2; 2 | SAL; 3; 3 | 1st | 301 |

=== Complete Italian F4 Championship results ===
(key) (Races in bold indicate pole position) (Races in italics indicate fastest lap)

| Year | Team | 1 | 2 | 3 | 4 | 5 | 6 | 7 | 8 | 9 | 10 | 11 | 12 | 13 | 14 | 15 | 16 | 17 | 18 | 19 | 20 | 21 | DC | Points |
|---|---|---|---|---|---|---|---|---|---|---|---|---|---|---|---|---|---|---|---|---|---|---|---|---|
| 2024 | Jenzer Motorsport | MIS; 1 | MIS; 2 | MIS; 3 | IMO; 1 | IMO; 2 | IMO; 3 | VLL; 1 | VLL; 2 | VLL; 3 | MUG; 1; 25 | MUG; 2; 21 | MUG; 3 Ret | LEC; 1 | LEC; 2 | LEC; 3 | CAT; 1 | CAT; 2 | CAT; 3 | MNZ; 1 | MNZ; 2 | MNZ; 3 | 47th | 0 |

=== Complete F4 Spanish Championship results ===
(key) (Races in bold indicate pole position) (Races in italics indicate fastest lap)

| Year | Team | 1 | 2 | 3 | 4 | 5 | 6 | 7 | 8 | 9 | 10 | 11 | 12 | 13 | 14 | 15 | 16 | 17 | 18 | 19 | 20 | 21 | DC | Points |
|---|---|---|---|---|---|---|---|---|---|---|---|---|---|---|---|---|---|---|---|---|---|---|---|---|
| 2024 | Drivex | JAR; 1 | JAR; 2 | JAR; 3 | POR; 1 | POR; 2 | POR; 3 | LEC; 1 | LEC; 2 | LEC; 3 | ARA; 1 | ARA; 2 | ARA; 3 | CRT; 1; 13 | CRT; 2; 24 | CRT; 3; 16 | JER; 1 | JER; 2 | JER; 3 | | | | 29th | 0 |
| 2024 | Saintéloc Racing | | | | | | | | | | | | | | | | | | | CAT; 1; 27 | CAT; 2 DNS | CAT; 3; 22 | 29th | 0 |

=== Complete Eurocup-3 Spanish Winter Championship results ===
(key) (Races in bold indicate pole position) (Races in italics indicate fastest lap)

| Year | Team | 1 | 2 | 3 | 4 | 5 | 6 | 7 | 8 | DC | Points |
|---|---|---|---|---|---|---|---|---|---|---|---|
| 2025 | Drivex | JER; 1; 10 | JER; 2; 11 | JER; 3; 7 | POR; 1; 9 | POR; 2; 4 | POR; 3; 12 | ARA; 1; 15 | ARA; 2; 12 | 15th | 20 |

=== Complete Eurocup-3 results ===
(key) (Races in bold indicate pole position) (Races in italics indicate fastest lap)

| Year | Team | 1 | 2 | 3 | 4 | 5 | 6 | 7 | 8 | 9 | 10 | 11 | 12 | 13 | 14 | 15 | 16 | 17 | 18 | 19 | DC | Points |
|---|---|---|---|---|---|---|---|---|---|---|---|---|---|---|---|---|---|---|---|---|---|---|
| 2025 | Drivex | RBR; 1; 10 | RBR; 2; 15 | POR; 1; 17 | POR; SR; Ret | POR; 2; 11 | LEC; 1 Ret | LEC; SR; 12 | LEC; 2; 10 | MNZ; 1; 19† | MNZ; 2; 15 | ASS; 1; 15 | ASS; 2; 13 | SPA; 1; 12 | SPA; 2; 8 | JER; 1; 15 | JER; 2; 16 | CAT; 1 | CAT; 2 | | 18th | 6 |
| 2026 | Drivex | LEC; 1 | LEC; SR | LEC; 2 | POR; 1 | POR; 2 | IMO; 1 | IMO; SR | IMO; 2 | MNZ; 1 | MNZ; 2 | SIL; 1 | SIL; 2 | JER; 1 | JER; SR | JER; 2 | HUN; 1; 16 | HUN; 2; 27 | CAT; 1 | CAT; 2 | NC† | 0 |

† As Wurz was a guest driver, he was ineligible for points.

=== Complete Macau Grand Prix results ===
| Year | Team | Car | Qualifying | Quali Race | Main Race |
|---|---|---|---|---|---|
| 2025 | (Australia) Evans GP | Tatuus F3 T-318 | 27th | DNF | DNF |

=== Complete Super Formula Lights results ===
(key) (Races in bold indicate pole position) (Races in italics indicate fastest lap)

| Year | Entrant | 1 | 2 | 3 | 4 | 5 | 6 | 7 | 8 | 9 | 10 | 11 | 12 | 13 | 14 | 15 | 16 | 17 | 18 | Pos | Points |
|---|---|---|---|---|---|---|---|---|---|---|---|---|---|---|---|---|---|---|---|---|---|
| 2026 | TOM'S | FUJ; 1; 5 | FUJ; 2; 8 | FUJ; 3; 4 | AUT; 1; 5 | AUT; 2; 7 | AUT; 3; 11 | SUZ; 1; 11 | SUZ; 2; 3 | SUZ; 3; 4 | OKA; 1; 4 | OKA; 2 Ret | OKA; 3; 9 | SUG; 1; 8 | SUG; 2; 6 | SUG; 3; 6 | MOT; 1; 11 | MOT; 2; 7 | MOT; 3; 9 | 8th | 19.5 |
