= 2023 Formula Nordic =

Motor racing championship held in 2023

The 2023 Formula Nordic season was the eleventh season of the Swedish-based single-seater championship, and the fifth independent of the STCC branding, following the formation of the series' association in the wake of the STCC promoter's bankruptcy in 2018. Formula Nordic continues to use the previous Formula Renault 1.6 chassis and engines, as it used to go under the name of Formula Renault 1.6 Nordic before Renault Sport dropped its support for the 3.5 and 1.6 classes in late 2015. The season began on 6 May at Mantorp Park, and concluded on 1 October at Jyllands-Ringen after 17 races held over seven rounds. This was the third season with Yokohama as the series' tyre supplier.

== Drivers and teams ==
Team	No.	Drivers	Rounds
(Norway) RPC Motorsport	3	(Norway) Olav Vaa	All
(Norway) RPC Motorsport	23	(Norway) Lilo Elise Fyrileiv	1–2
(Norway) RPC Motorsport	33	(Norway) Carita Livrud Otterstrøm	1–6
(Norway) RPC Motorsport	40	(Norway) Birk August Larsen	7
(Norway) RPC Motorsport	44	(Norway) Andreas Vaa	All
(Norway) RPC Motorsport	55	(Norway) Christer Otterstrøm	All
(Sweden) Granforce Racing	16	(Sweden) Linus Granfors	1–5, 7
(Sweden) Brink Motorsports	26	(Sweden) Oscar Pedersen	All
(Sweden) WestCoast Racing	41	(Sweden) Emma Wigroth	All
(Sweden) Ross Racing	47	(Sweden) Jonathan Engström	1–5
(Norway) Saltvedt Racing	48	(Norway) Peder Saltvedt	3–7
Privateer	70	(Sweden) Daniel Varverud	All
(Sweden) Aichhorn Racing	87	(Sweden) Andreas Aichhorn	1–3, 6–7
(Sweden) Project F1	88	(Sweden) Viktor Molander	All
F4 Danish Championship entries
(Denmark) STEP Motorsport	5	(Denmark) Victor Nielsen	2–3, 7
(Denmark) STEP Motorsport	29	(Austria) Oscar Wurz	7
(Denmark) STEP Motorsport	37	(Algeria) Leo Robinson	7
(Denmark) BAR	7	(Denmark) Mikkel Gaarde Pedersen	2–3, 7
(Denmark) FSP Racing	8	(Denmark) Louis Leveau	7
(Denmark) FSP Racing	99	(Denmark) Marius Kristiansen	7
(Denmark) Team Formula Sport	9	(Denmark) Morten Strømsted	3, 7
(Denmark) Team Formula Sport	21	(Denmark) Mathias Bjerre Jakobsen	2–3, 7
(Denmark) Team Formula Sport	30	(Denmark) Theodor Jensen	2–3
(Denmark) SD Racing	11	(Denmark) Frederik Stenå	2–3
(Denmark) MP Racing	12	(Denmark) Magnus Pedersen	2–3, 7
(Denmark) LR Racing	13	(Denmark) Lærke Rønn Sørensen	7
(Denmark) Henriksen Racing	15	(Denmark) Michella Rasmussen	2–3
Formula 5 entries
(Denmark) Leerskov Racing	4	(Denmark) Jørgen Leerskov	7
(Denmark) Mads Hoe Motorsport	4	(Denmark) Mads Hoe	2–3
(Denmark) Mads Hoe Motorsport	47	(Denmark) Mads Hoe	7
(Denmark) Mads Hoe Motorsport	27	(Germany) Oliver Kratsch	2–3, 7
(Denmark) Mads Hoe Motorsport	56	(Denmark) Mille Hoe	2–3, 7
(Denmark) Sønderskov Motorsport	39	(Denmark) Line Sønderskov	7
(Denmark) Rytteriet	49	(Denmark) Niels Ejnar Rytter	3, 7

== Race calendar and results ==
The season began on 6 May at Mantorp Park, and concluded on 1 October at Jyllands-Ringen, on a first-time visit to Denmark for the series, after 17 races held over seven rounds. The rounds at Anderstorp, Karlskoga and Jyllands-Ringen were held together with the F4 Danish Championship, after an agreement between the two series was reached in order to have combined grids. For all stand-alone rounds, the fastest time in qualifying clinched pole position for the first race, whereas the use of reversed grid races for the final race, where the top 6 were inverted, was continued. In three-race rounds, the 2nd fastest time in qualifying held pole position for the middle race. The rounds co-hosted with the F4 Danish had particular rules. The Anderstop double-header had the grid for race 1 according to the fastest lap in qualifying and the grid for race 2 according to the fastest lap in race 1. In the Karlskoga triple-header, grids for races 1 and 2 were made according to the fastest and 2nd fastest laps in qualifying respectively, while the grid for race 3 was set according to the fastest lap in race 2. For the Jyllands-Ringen triple-header, the grids for races 1 and 2 were made similarly to Anderstorp, whereas the grid for race 3 was set by a combination of the results in races 1 and 2.

Round		Circuit	Date	Pole position	Fastest lap	Winning driver	Winning team
1	R1	(Sweden) Mantorp Park, Mantorp	6 May	(Sweden) Linus Granfors	(Sweden) Linus Granfors	(Sweden) Linus Granfors	(Sweden) Granforce Racing
1	R2	(Sweden) Mantorp Park, Mantorp	7 May	(Sweden) Linus Granfors	(Sweden) Linus Granfors	(Sweden) Linus Granfors	(Sweden) Granforce Racing
1	R3	(Sweden) Mantorp Park, Mantorp	7 May		(Sweden) Oscar Pedersen	(Sweden) Linus Granfors	(Sweden) Granforce Racing
2	R1	(Sweden) Anderstorp Raceway, Anderstorp	13 May	(Norway) Christer Otterstrøm	(Sweden) Linus Granfors	(Sweden) Linus Granfors	(Sweden) Granforce Racing
2	R2	(Sweden) Anderstorp Raceway, Anderstorp	13 May		(Sweden) Linus Granfors	(Sweden) Linus Granfors	(Sweden) Granforce Racing
3	R1	(Sweden) Gelleråsen Arena, Karlskoga	4 June	(Sweden) Linus Granfors	(Sweden) Linus Granfors	(Sweden) Linus Granfors	(Sweden) Granforce Racing
3	R2	(Sweden) Gelleråsen Arena, Karlskoga	4 June	(Sweden) Linus Granfors	(Sweden) Linus Granfors	(Sweden) Linus Granfors	(Sweden) Granforce Racing
3	R3	(Sweden) Gelleråsen Arena, Karlskoga	4 June		(Sweden) Linus Granfors	(Sweden) Linus Granfors	(Sweden) Granforce Racing
4	R1	(Sweden) Skellefteå Drivecenter Arena, Fällfors	30 June	(Sweden) Linus Granfors	(Sweden) Linus Granfors	(Sweden) Linus Granfors	(Sweden) Granforce Racing
4	R2	(Sweden) Skellefteå Drivecenter Arena, Fällfors	30 June		(Sweden) Linus Granfors	(Sweden) Linus Granfors	(Sweden) Granforce Racing
5	R1	(Sweden) Skellefteå Drivecenter Arena, Fällfors	1 July	(Sweden) Linus Granfors	(Sweden) Linus Granfors	(Sweden) Linus Granfors	(Sweden) Granforce Racing
5	R2	(Sweden) Skellefteå Drivecenter Arena, Fällfors	1 July		(Sweden) Linus Granfors	(Sweden) Linus Granfors	(Sweden) Granforce Racing
6	R1	(Norway) Rudskogen Motorsenter, Rakkestad	5 August	(Sweden) Oscar Pedersen	(Sweden) Oscar Pedersen	(Sweden) Oscar Pedersen	(Sweden) Brink Motorsports
6	R2	(Norway) Rudskogen Motorsenter, Rakkestad	6 August		(Sweden) Oscar Pedersen	(Norway) Christer Otterstrøm	(Norway) RPC Motorsport
7	R1	(Denmark) Jyllands-Ringen, Silkeborg	1 October	(Sweden) Linus Granfors	(Sweden) Linus Granfors	(Sweden) Linus Granfors	(Sweden) Granforce Racing
7	R2	(Denmark) Jyllands-Ringen, Silkeborg	1 October		(Sweden) Linus Granfors	(Norway) Christer Otterstrøm	(Norway) RPC Motorsport
7	R3	(Denmark) Jyllands-Ringen, Silkeborg	1 October		(Sweden) Daniel Varverud	(Sweden) Daniel Varverud	Privateer

== Championship standings ==
Qualifying points system

Points are awarded to the top 5 fastest qualifying times.

Position	**1st**	**2nd**	**3rd**	**4th**	**5th**
Points	5	4	3	2	1

Race points system

Points are awarded to the top 10 classified finishers, no points are offered for fastest lap. The worst result for each driver is dropped from the final standings.

Position	**1st**	**2nd**	**3rd**	**4th**	**5th**	**6th**	**7th**	**8th**	**9th**	**10th**
Points	25	18	15	12	10	8	6	4	2	1

=== Formula Nordic Drivers' Championship (Nordic Cup and JSM) ===
Two championships are held, the Junior Svenskt Mästerskap (JSM) for drivers under 26 years old holding a Swedish driver license, and the Formula Nordic Cup, the latter serving as the overall championship.

Pos	Driver	MAN (Sweden)			AND1 (Sweden)		KAR (Sweden)			SKE1 (Sweden)		SKE2 (Sweden)		RUD (Norway)		JYL (Denmark)			Pts
1	(Sweden) Linus Granfors	**1**^{1}	**1**	1	4^{2}	5	**1**^{1}	**3**	3	**1**^{1}	1	**1**^{1}	1			**7**^{1}	6	15	382
2	(Sweden) Oscar Pedersen	2^{2}	3	4	Ret^{3}	Ret	6^{3}	8	7	Ret^{2}	3	2^{2}	3	**1**^{1}	2	9^{2}	12	Ret	238
3	(Sweden) Daniel Varverud	6^{5}	5	3	10	8	9	11	11	2^{5}	4	3^{3}	5	3^{3}	4	13^{4}	13	9	216
4	(Norway) Christer Otterstrøm	7^{3}	4	2	**8**^{1}	Ret	3^{2}	5	4	Ret	7	8	Ret	DNS	1	8^{3}	5	20	203
5	(Norway) Olav Vaa	3	7	8	11	11	7^{4}	10	14	3^{4}	2	4	2	2^{2}	3	12^{5}	DSQ	EX	183
6	(Sweden) Emma Wigroth	5	11	6	9^{5}	9	8	13	13	4	6	5	4	4^{5}	6	17	17	14	152
7	(Norway) Peder Saltvedt						12	12	12	5	5	6^{4}	Ret	5	5	15	14	11	107
8	(Sweden) Jonathan Engström	Ret^{4}	2	5	7^{4}	7	Ret^{5}	DNS	10	Ret^{3}	Ret	DNS	DNS						83
9	(Norway) Carita Livrud Otterstrøm	4	6	7	12	10	Ret	20	8	6	8	Ret^{5}	Ret	9^{4}	10				74
10	(Sweden) Andreas Aichhorn	10	9	Ret	16	15	14	18	Ret					7	8	18	18	12	54
11	(Sweden) Viktor Molander	11	10	11	17	16	DNS	DNS	DNS	7	9	9	6	8	9	25	23	23	37
12	(Norway) Andreas Vaa	9	8	10	Ret	17	13	Ret	15	DNS	DNS	7	Ret	6	7	19	Ret	Ret	36
13	(Norway) Birk August Larsen															20	22	22	12
14	(Norway) Lilo Elise Fyrileiv	8	Ret	9	Ret	DNS													6
F4 Danish Championship entries
–	(Denmark) Magnus Pedersen				1	2	2	1	2							1	8	1	–
–	(Denmark) Mikkel Gaarde Pedersen				2	1	DNS	9	1							Ret	7	5	–
–	(Denmark) Mathias Bjerre Jakobsen				5	4	Ret	2	6							26	1	3	–
–	(Denmark) Victor Nielsen				6	3	4	4	5							2	4	4	–
–	(Algeria) Leo Robinson															4	3	2	–
–	(Austria) Oscar Wurz															5	2	7	–
–	(Denmark) Mads Hoe				3	6	10	6	DNS							3	Ret	16	–
–	(Germany) Oliver Kratsch				19	Ret	5	7	9							11	10	13	–
–	(Denmark) Marius Kristiansen															6	Ret	6	–
–	(Denmark) Louis Leveau															14	9	8	–
–	(Denmark) Lærke Rønn Sørensen															10	11	10	–
–	(Denmark) Mille Hoe				13	12	11	14	16							21	16	21	–
–	(Denmark) Frederik Stenå				15	13	15	15	17										–
–	(Denmark) Michella Rasmussen				14	14	17	16	18										–
–	(Denmark) Morten Strømsted						16	17	19							16	15	17	–
–	(Denmark) Niels Ejnar Rytter						18	19	20							23	20	19	–
–	(Denmark) Jørgen Leerskov															24	21	18	–
–	(Denmark) Theodor Jensen				18†	DNS	WD	WD	WD										–
–	(Denmark) Line Sønderskov															22	19	Ret	–
Pos	Driver	MAN (Sweden)			AND1 (Sweden)		KAR (Sweden)			SKE1 (Sweden)		SKE2 (Sweden)		RUD (Norway)		JYL (Denmark)			Pts

Colour	Result
Gold	Winner
Silver	Second place
Bronze	Third place
Green	Points classification
Blue	Non-points classification
Blue	Non-classified finish (NC)
Purple	Retired, not classified (Ret)
Red	Did not qualify (DNQ)
Red	Did not pre-qualify (DNPQ)
Black	Disqualified (DSQ)
White	Did not start (DNS)
White	Withdrew (WD)
White	Race cancelled (C)
Blank	Did not practice (DNP)
Blank	Did not arrive (DNA)
Blank	Excluded (EX)

**Bold** – Pole
Italics – Fastest Lap
1 – 5 Points for Pole
2 – 4 Points for P2
3 – 3 Points for P3
4 – 2 Points for P4
5 – 1 Point for P5

† – Driver did not finish the race, but was classified as they completed over 75% of the race distance.
