= 2022 Formula Nordic =

Motor racing championship held in 2022

The 2022 Formula Nordic season was the tenth season of the Swedish-based single-seater championship, and the fourth independent of the STCC branding, following the STCC promoter's bankruptcy in 2018. The series continued to use the previous Formula Renault 1.6 chassis and engines, with Yokohama as the series' tyre supplier.

The season began on 13 May at Anderstorp Raceway, and concluded on 1 October at Mantorp Park after 15 races held over seven rounds. Philip Victorsson won the championship in his third season in the series, taking nine wins.

== Drivers and teams ==
Team	No.	Drivers	Rounds
(Sweden) Granforce Racing	16	(Sweden) Linus Granfors	All
(Sweden) WestCoast Racing	41	(Sweden) Emma Wigroth	2–7
(Sweden) Ross Racing	47	(Sweden) Jonathan Engström	All
(Norway) isiRacing	50	(Norway) Christer Otterstrøm	6
Privateer	55	(Sweden) Philip Victorsson	All
(Sweden) NIKA Racing	66	(Norway) Benjamin Fuglesang	All

== Race calendar and results ==
The season was held over seven rounds, beginning at Anderstorp Raceway, and concluding at Mantorp Park.

Round		Circuit	Date	Pole position	Fastest lap	Winning driver	Winning team
1	R1	(Sweden) Anderstorp Raceway, Anderstorp	14 May	(Norway) Benjamin Fuglesang	(Sweden) Philip Victorsson	(Sweden) Philip Victorsson	Privateer
1	R2	(Sweden) Anderstorp Raceway, Anderstorp	14 May		(Sweden) Philip Victorsson	(Sweden) Philip Victorsson	Privateer
2	R1	(Sweden) Falkenbergs Motorbana, Bergagård	8 July	(Norway) Benjamin Fuglesang	(Sweden) Philip Victorsson	(Sweden) Philip Victorsson	Privateer
2	R2	(Sweden) Falkenbergs Motorbana, Bergagård	9 July	(Sweden) Philip Victorsson	(Sweden) Philip Victorsson	(Sweden) Philip Victorsson	Privateer
2	R3	(Sweden) Falkenbergs Motorbana, Bergagård	9 July		(Norway) Benjamin Fuglesang	(Sweden) Philip Victorsson	Privateer
3	R1	(Sweden) Anderstorp Raceway, Anderstorp	6 August	(Norway) Benjamin Fuglesang	(Sweden) Philip Victorsson	(Sweden) Philip Victorsson	Privateer
3	R2	(Sweden) Anderstorp Raceway, Anderstorp	6 August		(Sweden) Philip Victorsson	(Sweden) Philip Victorsson	Privateer
4	R1	(Sweden) Gelleråsen Arena, Karlskoga	20 August	(Sweden) Linus Granfors	(Sweden) Emma Wigroth	(Sweden) Emma Wigroth	(Sweden) WestCoast Racing
4	R2	(Sweden) Gelleråsen Arena, Karlskoga	20 August		(Sweden) Philip Victorsson	(Sweden) Philip Victorsson	Privateer
5	R1	(Sweden) Anderstorp Raceway, Anderstorp	11 September	(Sweden) Linus Granfors	(Norway) Benjamin Fuglesang	(Sweden) Philip Victorsson	Privateer
5	R2	(Sweden) Anderstorp Raceway, Anderstorp	11 September		(Norway) Benjamin Fuglesang	(Norway) Benjamin Fuglesang	(Sweden) NIKA Racing
6	R1	(Norway) Rudskogen Motorsenter, Rakkestad	17 September	(Norway) Benjamin Fuglesang	(Norway) Benjamin Fuglesang	(Norway) Benjamin Fuglesang	(Sweden) NIKA Racing
6	R2	(Norway) Rudskogen Motorsenter, Rakkestad	17 September		(Norway) Benjamin Fuglesang	(Norway) Benjamin Fuglesang	(Sweden) NIKA Racing
7	R1	(Sweden) Mantorp Park, Mantorp	1 October	(Sweden) Philip Victorsson	(Sweden) Philip Victorsson	(Sweden) Linus Granfors	(Sweden) Granforce Racing
7	R2	(Sweden) Mantorp Park, Mantorp	1 October		(Norway) Benjamin Fuglesang	(Sweden) Jonathan Engström	(Sweden) Ross Racing

== Championship standings ==
Qualifying points system

Points were awarded to the top 5 fastest qualifying times.

Position	**1st**	**2nd**	**3rd**	**4th**	**5th**
Points	5	4	3	2	1

Race points system

Points were awarded to the top 10 classified finishers; no points were offered for fastest lap. The worst result for each driver was dropped from the final standings.

Position	**1st**	**2nd**	**3rd**	**4th**	**5th**	**6th**	**7th**	**8th**	**9th**	**10th**
Points	25	18	15	12	10	8	6	4	2	1

=== Drivers' Championship ===
Pos	Driver	AND1 (Sweden)		FAL (Sweden)			AND2 (Sweden)		KAR (Sweden)		AND3 (Sweden)		RUD (Norway)		MAN (Sweden)		Pts
1	(Sweden) Philip Victorsson	1^{2}	1	1^{2}	**1**	1	1^{2}	1	3^{2}	1	1^{2}	2	4^{4}	3	**2**^{1}	3	333
2	(Norway) Benjamin Fuglesang	**Ret**^{1}	2	**2**^{1}	2	4	**2**^{1}	3	4^{3}	Ret	4^{4}	1	**1**^{1}	1	3^{3}	2	259
3	(Sweden) Linus Granfors	2^{3}	4	3^{3}	3	3	3^{3}	2	**5**^{1}	4	**2**^{1}	3	2^{2}	4	1^{2}	4	247
4	(Sweden) Jonathan Engström	3^{4}	3	4^{5}	4	2	4^{5}	4	2^{5}	3	3^{3}	4	5	5	4^{5}	1	212
5	(Sweden) Emma Wigroth			Ret^{4}	Ret	5	5^{4}	5	1^{4}	2	5^{5}	5	6^{5}	6	5^{4}	5	139
6	(Norway) Christer Otterstrøm												3^{3}	2			36
Pos	Driver	AND1 (Sweden)		FAL (Sweden)			AND2 (Sweden)		KAR (Sweden)		AND3 (Sweden)		RUD (Norway)		MAN (Sweden)		Pts

Colour	Result
Gold	Winner
Silver	Second place
Bronze	Third place
Green	Points classification
Blue	Non-points classification
Blue	Non-classified finish (NC)
Purple	Retired, not classified (Ret)
Red	Did not qualify (DNQ)
Red	Did not pre-qualify (DNPQ)
Black	Disqualified (DSQ)
White	Did not start (DNS)
White	Withdrew (WD)
White	Race cancelled (C)
Blank	Did not practice (DNP)
Blank	Did not arrive (DNA)
Blank	Excluded (EX)

**Bold** – Pole
Italics – Fastest Lap
Superscript – Points-scoring qualifying position
