= Theodor Jensen =

Danish racing driver (born 2006)

- Jensen at Silverstone Circuit in 2026
- Nationality: (Denmark) Danish
- Born: Theodor Peter Roos Jensen; 30 June 2006 (age 20) Randers, Denmark

Eurocup-3 career
- Debut season: 2024
- Current team: Palou Motorsport
- Categorisation: FIA Silver
- Starts: 21
- Championships: 0
- Wins: 0
- Podiums: 0
- Poles: 0
- Fastest laps: 0
- Best finish: 14th in 2024

Previous series
- 2022–23 2022–23 2023 2023 2024 2024 2024: F4 Danish Championship; F4 Spanish Championship; Formula 4 UAE Championship; Danish Endurance Championship; Ultimate Cup Series - European Endurance Prototype Cup; Formula Regional Americas Championship; Le Mans Cup

Theodor Peter Roos "Theo" Jensen (born 30 June 2006) is a Danish racing driver, who is competing in the LMP2 class of the European Le Mans Series with CLX Motorsport.

== Career ==
=== Junior formulae ===
==== Formula 4 ====
Having forgone karting, Jensen began his car racing career in his home country, competing in the 2022 F4 Danish Championship. Driving for Team Formula Sport, Jensen scored a lone win at Padborg Park and finished seventh in the standings. He also contested the final three rounds of the Spanish F4 Championship with Saintéloc Racing.

At the start of 2023, Jensen contested F4 UAE with Saintéloc, where he did not score points. This trend continued into Jensen's full Spanish F4 season, where he was classified 30th in the championship after scoring a best race finish of 12th in Barcelona. He also drove in several rounds of the Danish F4 season, winning four races.

==== Formula Regional ====
Jensen moved up to Eurocup-3 in 2024 with Palou Motorsport. He cited a driver-focused environment as the reason for his switch, which he made in view of switching to the Road to Indy ladder in the future. After the more experienced Kirill Smal left the series following the second round, Jensen became Palou's main points scorer, eventually finishing 14th in the standings. His highlight performance came at the Algarve, as Jensen went from 20th to seventh during race 3.

=== Sports car racing ===
Having made his first foray into sports car racing in the Danish Endurance Championship in 2023, Jensen entered the LMP3 prototype class in 2024. He first drove a Duqueine M30 - D08 for TS Corse in the opening round of the Ultimate Cup Series, before switching to the Ligier JS P320 chassis with Bretton Racing for round 4 at Mugello. Before the latter event however, Jensen partnered bronze-ranked Ben Stone for the Spa-Francorchamps event of the Le Mans Cup. During a chaotic race, Jensen made brave overtakes on Adrien Closmenil and Samir Ben just before the end to finish second on the road; the No. 62 would be promoted to first after the race due to a penalty for the initial race winners, giving Jensen his maiden win on an international stage. At the following LMC round in Mugello, Jensen and Stone earned second place, a result that helped Bretton to finish seventh in the standings. After the season ended, Jensen set the fastest time at the post-season test with R-ace GP.

During the winter, Jensen competed in the Asian Le Mans Series alongside bronze-ranked Jens Reno Møller and the swapping pair of Dan Skočdopole and Griffin Peebles. Two fourth places in Sepang were followed by a standout drive from Jensen at Dubai, where he drove away from the chasing Matteo Quintarelli at the end of race 1 to claim victory. Second places in Dubai race 2 and Abu Dhabi race 1 set up a title decider on Yas Island, as Jensen and Møller were five points behind Quintarelli. Third place on Sunday was enough for Jensen to clinch the LMP3 title.

Jensen signed up to compete in the European Le Mans Series, piloting the new Ligier JS P325 alongside Adrien Closmenil and bronze-ranked Paul Lanchère. With a fast car, proven by Closmenil taking pole position, Jensen and his teammates took victory. Another pole and victory double followed during the next round, as Closmenil took the lead during the final hour at Le Castellet. Jensen and Closmenil then joined forces to contest the Road to Le Mans event in June. The pair won the opening race and were in contention for the win in race 2, before Jensen spun into the pit wall during a safety car restart. Nevertheless, Jensen continued his success streak with his maiden sportscar pole at a rainy Imola, one that the team converted into a dominant third victory of the campaign.

== Racing record ==
=== Racing career summary ===
| Season | Series | Team | Races | Wins | Poles | F/Laps | Podiums | Points | Position |
|---|---|---|---|---|---|---|---|---|---|
| 2022 | F4 Danish Championship | Team Formula Sport | 19 | 1 | 0 | 0 | 3 | 162 | 7th |
| 2022 | F4 Spanish Championship | Saintéloc Racing | 9 | 0 | 0 | 0 | 0 | 0 | 30th |
| 2023 | Formula 4 UAE Championship | Saintéloc Racing | 15 | 0 | 0 | 0 | 0 | 0 | 37th |
| 2023 | F4 Spanish Championship | Saintéloc Racing | 20 | 0 | 0 | 0 | 0 | 0 | 30th |
| 2023 | F4 Danish Championship | Team Formula Sport | 4 | 1 | 1 | 0 | 1 | 112 | 7th |
| 2023 | F4 Danish Championship | FSP Racing | 3 | 3 | 1 | 2 | 3 | 112 | 7th |
| 2023 | Formula Nordic | Team Formula Sport | 1 | 0 | 0 | 0 | 0 | 0 | NC† |
| 2023 | Danish Endurance Championship - DEC4 | Theodor Jensen Racing | 4 | 0 | 0 | 0 | 1 | 64 | 8th |
| 2024 | Eurocup-3 | Palou Motorsport | 16 | 0 | 0 | 0 | 0 | 25 | 14th |
| 2024 | Formula Regional Americas Championship | Jensen Global Advisors | 3 | 0 | 0 | 0 | 1 | 32 | 13rd |
| 2024 | Le Mans Cup - LMP3 | Bretton Racing | 3 | 1 | 0 | 0 | 2 | 43 | 8th |
| 2024 | Ultimate Cup Series - European Endurance Prototype Cup - LMP3 | Bretton Racing | 1 | 0 | 0 | 0 | 0 | 18 | 22nd |
| 2024 | Ultimate Cup Series - European Endurance Prototype Cup - LMP3 | TS Corse | 1 | 0 | 0 | 0 | 0 | 18 | 22nd |
| 2024–25 | Asian Le Mans Series - LMP3 | Bretton Racing | 5 | 1 | 0 | 0 | 4 | 100 | **1st** |
| 2025 | European Le Mans Series - LMP3 | CLX Motorsport | 6 | 5 | 3 | 3 | 5 | 130 | **1st** |
| 2025 | Le Mans Cup - LMP3 | CLX Motorsport | 2 | 1 | 0 | 0 | 1 | 0 | NC† |
| 2025 | European Sprint Prototype Cup - LMP3 | Bretton Racing | 2 | 2 | 1 | 0 | 2 | 50 | 7th |
| 2025 | Eurocup-3 | Saintéloc Racing | 3 | 0 | 0 | 0 | 0 | 0 | 36th |
| 2025–26 | Asian Le Mans Series - LMP2 | High Class Racing | 6 | 1 | 0 | 0 | 1 | 36 | 8th |
| 2026 | European Le Mans Series - LMP2 | CLX Motorsport | 6 | 0 | 0 | 0 | 0 | 36 | 9th |
| 2026 | 24 Hours of Le Mans - LMP2 | CLX Motorsport | 1 | 0 | 0 | 0 | 0 | N/A | 5th |
| 2026 | International GT Open | Iron Lynx | 1 | 0 | 0 | 0 | 0 | 0 | 60th |
| 2026 | European Endurance Prototype Cup | CD Sport | 3 | 1 | 0 | 1 | 1 | 36.25* | 6th* |
| 2026 | European Endurance Prototype Cup | ANS Motorsport | 2 | 0 | 0 | 0 | 0 | 36.25* | 6th* |
| 2026–27 | Asian Le Mans Series - LMP2 | Algarve Pro Racing | | | | | | | |

* Season still in progress.
† As Jensen was a guest driver, he was ineligible for points

=== Complete F4 Danish Championship results ===
(key) (Races in bold indicate pole position) (Races in italics indicate fastest lap)

| Year | Team | 1 | 2 | 3 | 4 | 5 | 6 | 7 | 8 | 9 | 10 | 11 | 12 | 13 | 14 | 15 | 16 | 17 | 18 | 19 | DC | Points |
|---|---|---|---|---|---|---|---|---|---|---|---|---|---|---|---|---|---|---|---|---|---|---|
| 2022 | Team Formula Sport | PAD1; 1; 6 | PAD1; 2; 4 | PAD1; 3; 12 | STU; 1; 3 | STU; 2; 6 | STU; 3; 5 | JYL1; 1 DSQ | JYL1; 2; 7 | JYL1; 3; 8 | DJU; 1 DSQ | DJU; 2; 6 | DJU; 3; 5 | DJU; 4; 7 | PAD2; 1; 5 | PAD2; 2; 1 | PAD2; 3; 2 | JYL2; 1; 8 | JYL2; 2; 5 | JYL2; 3; 6 | 7th | 162 |
| 2023 | Team Formula Sport | **PAD1**; **1**; 1 | PAD1; 2; 5 | PAD1; 3 Ret | AND; 1; 18† | AND; 2 DNS | KAR; 1 WD | KAR; 2 WD | KAR; 3 WD | DJU; 1 | DJU; 2 | DJU; 3 | DJU; 4 | **PAD2**; **1**; 1 | PAD2; 2; 1 | PAD2; 3; 1 | JYL; 1 | JYL; 2 | JYL; 3 | | 7th | 112 |

=== Complete F4 Spanish Championship results ===
(key) (Races in bold indicate pole position) (Races in italics indicate fastest lap)

| Year | Team | 1 | 2 | 3 | 4 | 5 | 6 | 7 | 8 | 9 | 10 | 11 | 12 | 13 | 14 | 15 | 16 | 17 | 18 | 19 | 20 | 21 | DC | Points |
|---|---|---|---|---|---|---|---|---|---|---|---|---|---|---|---|---|---|---|---|---|---|---|---|---|
| 2022 | Saintéloc Racing | ALG; 1 | ALG; 2 | ALG; 3 | JER; 1 | JER; 2 | JER; 3 | CRT; 1 | CRT; 2 | CRT; 3 | SPA; 1 | SPA; 2 | SPA; 3 | ARA; 1; 15 | ARA; 2; 20 | ARA; 3; 20 | NAV; 1; 23 | NAV; 2; 22 | NAV; 3; 14 | CAT; 1; 26 | CAT; 2; 22 | CAT; 3 Ret | 30th | 0 |
| 2023 | Saintéloc Racing | SPA; 1; 28 | SPA; 2; 14 | SPA; 3; 19 | ARA; 1; 18 | ARA; 2; 26† | ARA; 3; 22 | NAV; 1 DNS | NAV; 2; 15 | NAV; 3; 15 | JER; 1; 15 | JER; 2; 31 | JER; 3; 20 | EST; 1; 22 | EST; 2; 13 | EST; 3; 21 | CRT; 1; 16 | CRT; 2; 22 | CRT; 3; 29 | CAT; 1; 14 | CAT; 2; 12 | CAT; 3; 24† | 30th | 0 |

=== Complete Formula 4 UAE Championship results ===
(key) (Races in bold indicate pole position) (Races in italics indicate fastest lap)

| Year | Team | 1 | 2 | 3 | 4 | 5 | 6 | 7 | 8 | 9 | 10 | 11 | 12 | 13 | 14 | 15 | DC | Points |
|---|---|---|---|---|---|---|---|---|---|---|---|---|---|---|---|---|---|---|
| 2023 | Saintéloc Racing | DUB1; 1; 23 | DUB1; 2; 24 | DUB1; 3; 32 | KMT1; 1; 19 | KMT1; 2 Ret | KMT1; 3; 28 | KMT2; 1; 19 | KMT2; 2; 23 | KMT2; 3; 36† | DUB2; 1 Ret | DUB2; 2 Ret | DUB2; 3 Ret | YMC; 1; 18 | YMC; 2; 21 | YMC; 3; 27 | 37th | 0 |

=== Complete Eurocup-3 results ===
(key) (Races in bold indicate pole position) (Races in italics indicate fastest lap)

| Year | Team | 1 | 2 | 3 | 4 | 5 | 6 | 7 | 8 | 9 | 10 | 11 | 12 | 13 | 14 | 15 | 16 | 17 | 18 | DC | Points |
|---|---|---|---|---|---|---|---|---|---|---|---|---|---|---|---|---|---|---|---|---|---|
| 2024 | Palou Motorsport | SPA; 1; 9 | SPA; 2 C | RBR; 1; 18 | RBR; 2; 10 | POR; 1 Ret | POR; 2; 10 | POR; 3; 7 | LEC; 1; 15 | LEC; 2; 19 | ZAN; 1; 7 | ZAN; 2; 16 | ARA; 1; 9 | ARA; 2; 18 | JER; 1; 11 | JER; 2 Ret | CAT; 1; 18 | CAT; 2; 9 | | 14th | 25 |
| 2025 | Saintéloc Racing | RBR; 1 | RBR; 2 | POR; 1 Ret | POR; SR; Ret | POR; 2; 15 | LEC; 1 | LEC; SR | LEC; 2 | MNZ; 1 | MNZ; 2 | ASS; 1 | ASS; 2 | SPA; 1 | SPA; 2 | JER; 1 | JER; 2 | CAT; 1 | CAT; 2 | 36th | 0 |

=== Complete Le Mans Cup results ===
(key) (Races in bold indicate pole position; results in italics indicate fastest lap)

| Year | Entrant | Class | Chassis | 1 | 2 | 3 | 4 | 5 | 6 | 7 | Rank | Points |
|---|---|---|---|---|---|---|---|---|---|---|---|---|
| 2024 | Bretton Racing | LMP3 | Ligier JS P320 | CAT | LEC | LMS; 1 | LMS; 2 | SPA; 1 | MUG; 2 | ALG; 23 | 8th | 43 |

=== Complete Asian Le Mans Series results ===
(key) (Races in bold indicate pole position) (Races in italics indicate fastest lap)

| Year | Team | Class | Chassis | 1 | 2 | 3 | 4 | 5 | 6 | DC | Points |
|---|---|---|---|---|---|---|---|---|---|---|---|
| 2024–25 | Bretton Racing | LMP3 | Ligier JS P320 | SEP; 1; 4 | SEP; 2; 4 | DUB; 1; 1 | DUB; 2; 2 | ABU; 1; 2 | ABU; 2; 3 | 1st | 100 |
| 2025–26 | High Class Racing | LMP2 | Oreca 07 | SEP; 1; 12 | **SEP**; **2**; 7 | DUB; 1; 9 | DUB; 2; 6 | ABU; 1; 8 | ABU; 2; 3 | 8th | 36 |

=== Complete European Le Mans Series results ===
(key) (Races in bold indicate pole position; results in italics indicate fastest lap)

| Year | Entrant | Class | Chassis | Engine | 1 | 2 | 3 | 4 | 5 | 6 | Rank | Points |
|---|---|---|---|---|---|---|---|---|---|---|---|---|
| 2025 | CLX Motorsport | LMP3 | Ligier JS P325 | Toyota V35A 3.5 L V6 | **CAT**; 1 | **LEC**; 1 | **IMO**; 1 | **SPA**; Ret | SIL; 1 | **ALG**; 1 | 1st | 130 |
| 2026 | CLX Motorsport | LMP2 | Oreca 07 | Gibson GK428 4.2 L V8 | CAT; 8 | LEC; 6 | IMO; 9 | SPA; 7 | SIL; 5 | ALG; 7 | 9th | 36 |

^{*} Season still in progress.

=== Complete 24 Hours of Le Mans results ===
| Year | Team | Co-Drivers | Car | Class | Laps | Pos. | Class Pos. |
|---|---|---|---|---|---|---|---|
| 2026 | (Switzerland) CLX Motorsport | (Mexico) Ian Aguilera (France) Adrien Closmenil | Oreca 07-Gibson | LMP2 | 360 | 19th | 5th |
