= Leo Robinson (racing driver) =

Algerian-British racing driver (born 2009)

- Nationality: (Algeria) Algerian
- Born: Leo Sami Robinson; 28 February 2009 (age 17) Henley-on-Thames, South Oxfordshire, England

Le Mans Cup career
- Debut season: 2025
- Current team: Bretton Racing
- Categorisation: FIA Silver
- Car number: 62
- Former teams: Team Virage
- Starts: 5
- Wins: 1
- Podiums: 2
- Poles: 0
- Fastest laps: 0
- Statistics up to date as of 28 August 2026.

Leo Sami Robinson (born 28 February 2009) is a British-Algerian racing driver who currently competes in the 2026 Le Mans Cup for Bretton Racing. He is set to compete in the LMP2 class of the 2026–27 Asian Le Mans Series for Team Virage.

== Early career ==
=== Karting ===
Robinson made his competitive karting debut in 2015, in the Bambino class of the MSA Championship and won the title in 2016. He began competing in IAME-sanctioned events in 2019, competing in the X30 Mini class, his highlights of the year was coming third in the IAME Winter Cup, IAME Euro Series and the IAME International Final.

Robinson kicked off the 2020 season with another third place in the X30 Mini category of the IAME Winter Cup and won the IAME International Games in the same class.

In 2021, Robinson came sixth and eighth in the X30 Junior category of the IAME Winter Cup and the IAME Warriors Final, respectively. Robinson won the British Kart Championship in the X30 Mini class and represented Algeria in the Junior category of the MENA Karting Nations Cup and won it. He also competed in the CIK-FIA Karting Academy Trophy and came tenth overall.

Robinson made a full time switch to X30 Junior machinery in 2022, finishing runner-up to the IAME Winter Cup, coming fourth in the LGM Series and fifth in the IAME Warriors Final. He also competed full-time in the X30 Junior and Junior TKM class of the British Kart Championship, coming fifth in the former and sixth in the latter. Robinson represented Algeria in the MENA Karting Nations Cup in the Junior class for the second time, but unlike 2021 where he won it, he came in sixth instead. Robinson competed in the Junior TKM category of the 2023 British Kart Championship, where he came in fourth.

=== Ginetta Junior Championship ===
Robinson made his car racing debut in the 2023 Ginetta Junior Championship for Alastair Rushforth Motorsport, but switched to R Racing after the first round, and picked up his first win in racing at the third race of the second round at Silverstone Circuit. He departed from the team and series at the end of the fourth round also held at Silverstone Circuit, where he got his first pole position in the third race but retired from it after a collision. Robinson finished the championship in fourteenth with one win, one podium, one pole position, two fastest laps and 179 points.

=== Formula 4 ===
==== 2023 ====
After making his car racing debut in the 2023 Ginetta Junior Championship, Robinson switched to open-wheelers mid season and made his Formula 4 debut in the 2023 F4 Danish Championship with STEP Motorsport. He finished on the podium in every race he competed in but could not muster any wins and finished the championship in fourth with two fastest laps, ten podiums and 165 points.

==== 2024 ====
In 2024, Robinson contested the F4 British Championship, signing with JHR Developments. He claimed his first win in the series at the Silverstone Circuit (grand prix layout), after a chaotic race. He would claim two more wins throughout the season, at Knockhill and Brands Hatch. Robinson finished the season in sixth with three wins, one fastest lap, six podiums and 164 points. (grand prix layout)

==== 2025 ====
Robinson started off the year in the 2025 Formula Winter Series for Hitech TGR, being in title contention. He won his first race of the season in the third race of the second round at the Circuit Ricardo Tormo, also claiming the fastest lap. In the fourth and final round at the Circuit de Barcelona-Catalunya, he converted his first two pole positions of the year into wins. Robinson finished the championship runner-up to the title with three wins, one pole position, two fastest laps, seven podiums and 163 points.

For his main campaign of the season, Robinson remained in British F4 for the 2025 season, switching to Hitech Grand Prix. He had a difficult rest of the year though, sporadically getting points with the highlight of his campaign being at Thruxton Circuit, where he got a second place in the opening race and a win in the second race. Robinson departed from the series halfway through the year, he ended the championship in twelfth.

== Sportscar career ==
=== 2025 ===
After his Formula 4 exploits, Robinson joined Team Virage with Brandon McCaughan for a one-off round in the JS P4 class of the Ligier European Series at Silverstone, winning both races and ending the year ninth in points. He also took part in the final round of the Le Mans Cup in the LMP3 Pro-Am class for the same team.

=== 2026 ===
Robinson was set to compete in the 2026 Le Mans Cup with Team Virage, but switched to Bretton Racing prior to the start of the season.

== Karting record ==
=== Karting career summary ===
Season	Series	Team	Position
2016	MSA Championship - Bambino		1st
2018	LGM Series - IAME Cadet		15th
2019	IAME Winter Cup - X30 Mini	Fusion	3rd
2019	IAME Euro Series - X30 Mini	Fusion Motorsport	3rd
2019	British Kart Championship - IAME Cadet	Fusion Motorsport	33rd
2019	SKUSA SuperNationals XXIII - Mini Swift		6th
2019	IAME International Final - X30 Mini		3rd
2020	IAME Winter Cup - X30 Mini	Fusion	3rd
2020	IAME Euro Series - X30 Junior		28th
2020	Kartmasters British Grand Prix - X30 Mini		16th
2020	IAME International Games - X30 Mini	Fusion Motorsport	1st
2021	CIK-FIA Karting Academy Trophy	Robinson, Lance	10th
2021	IAME Winter Cup - X30 Junior	Fusion Motorsport	6th
2021	IAME Warriors Final - X30 Junior	Fusion Motorsport	8th
2021	British Kart Championship - X30 Mini	Fusion Motorsport	1st
2021	MENA Karting Nations Cup - Junior	Algeria	1st
2022	IAME Winter Cup - X30 Junior	Fusion Motorsport	2nd
2022	LGM Series - Junior X30	Fusion Motorsport	4th
2022	IAME Warriors Final - X30 Junior	Fusion Motorsport	5th
2022	IAME Euro Series - X30 Junior	Fusion Motorsport	18th
2022	British Kart Championship - X30 Junior		5th
2022	British Kart Championship - Junior TKM		6th
2022	MENA Karting Nations Cup - Junior	Algeria	6th
2023	British Kart Championship - Junior TKM	TWM	4th

== Racing record ==
=== Racing career summary ===
Season	Series	Team	Races	Wins	Poles	F/Laps	Podiums	Points	Position
2023	Ginetta Junior Championship	Alastair Rushforth Motorsport	3	0	0	0	0	179	14th
2023	Ginetta Junior Championship	R Racing	10	1	1	2	1	179	14th
2023	F4 Danish Championship	STEP Motorsport	10	0	0	2	10	165	4th
2023	Formula Nordic	STEP Motorsport	3	0	0	0	2	—N/a	NC†
2024	F4 British Championship	JHR Developments	30	3	0	1	6	164	6th
2025	Formula Winter Series	Hitech TGR	12	3	2	2	7	163	**2nd**
2025	F4 British Championship	Hitech TGR	15	1	0	1	2	82	12th
2025	Ligier European Series - JS P4	Team Virage	2	2	0	0	2	50	9th
2025	Le Mans Cup - LMP3 Pro-Am	Team Virage	1	0	0	0	0	—N/a	NC†
2026	Le Mans Cup - LMP3 Pro-Am	Bretton Racing	6	1	0	2	2	82	4th
2026-27	Asian Le Mans Series - LMP2	Team Virage							

† As Robinson was a guest driver, he was ineligible to score championship points.
^{*} Season still in progress.

=== Complete Ginetta Junior Championship results ===
(key) (Races in bold indicate pole position) (Races in italics indicate fastest lap)

Year	Team	1	2	3	4	5	6	7	8	9	10	11	12	13	14	15	16	17	18	19	20	21	22	23	24	25	26	27	DC	Points
2023	Alastair Rushforth Motorsport	OUL; 1; 15	OUL; 2; 11	OUL; 3; 7																									14th	179
2023	R Racing				SIL1; 1; 14	SIL1; 2; 4	SIL1; 3; 1	DON1; 1; 4	DON1; 2 Ret	DON1; 3; 11	SIL2; 1; 5	SIL2; 2; 7	SIL2; 3; 7	**SIL2**; **4** Ret	SIL2; 5 WD	SIL2; 6 WD	SNE; 1	SNE; 2	SNE; 3	CAD; 1	CAD; 2	CAD; 3	BHGP; 1	BHGP; 2	BHGP; 3	DON2; 1	DON2; 2	DON2; 3	14th	179

=== Complete F4 Danish Championship results ===
(key) (Races in bold indicate pole position) (Races in italics indicate fastest lap)

Year	Team	1	2	3	4	5	6	7	8	9	10	11	12	13	14	15	16	17	18	DC	Points
2023	STEP Motorsport	PAD1; 1	PAD1; 2	PAD1; 3	AND; 1	AND; 2	KAR; 1	KAR; 2	KAR; 3	DJU; 1; 2	DJU; 2; 3	DJU; 3; 2	DJU; 4; 3	PAD2; 1; 3	PAD2; 2; 2	PAD2; 3; 2	JYL; 1; 3	JYL; 2; 3	JYL; 3; 2	4th	165

=== Complete F4 British Championship results ===
(key) (Races in bold indicate pole position) (Races in italics indicate fastest lap)

Year	Team	1	2	3	4	5	6	7	8	9	10	11	12	13	14	15	16	17	18	19	20	21	22	23	24	25	26	27	28	29	30	31	32	DC	Points
2024	JHR Developments	DPN; 1; 13	DPN; 2; 12^{1}	DPN; 3 C	BHI; 1; 14	BHI; 2 DSQ	BHI; 3; 7	SNE; 1; 12	SNE; 2; 7	SNE; 3 Ret	THR; 1; 7	THR; 2; 4	THR; 3; 7	SILGP; 1; 7	SILGP; 2; 1^{1}	SILGP; 3; 4	ZAN; 1 Ret	ZAN; 2; 9^{6}	ZAN; 3 Ret	KNO; 1; 7	KNO; 2; 1^{2}	KNO; 3; 10	DPGP; 1; 3	DPGP; 2; 5	DPGP; 3; 9^{1}	DPGP; 4; 4	SILN; 1; 11	SILN; 2 C	SILN; 3; 11	BHGP; 1; 3	BHGP; 2; 1^{2}	BHGP; 3; 10	BHGP; 4; 2	6th	164
2025	Hitech TGR	DPN; 1; 11	DPN; 2; 7^{7}	DPN; 3; 8	SILGP; 1 Ret	SILGP; 2; 9^{5}	SILGP; 3; 5	SNE; 1 Ret	SNE; 2; 5^{2}	SNE; 3 Ret	THR; 1; 2	THR; 2; 1^{2}	THR; 3; 13	OUL; 1; 6	OUL; 2; 11^{2}	OUL; 3; 12	SILGP; 1; 9	SILGP; 2; 9	ZAN; 1	ZAN; 2	ZAN; 3	KNO; 1	KNO; 2	KNO; 3	DPGP; 1	DPGP; 2	DPGP; 3	SILN; 1	SILN; 2	SILN; 3	BHGP; 1	BHGP; 2	BHGP; 3	12th	82

=== Complete Formula Winter Series results ===
(key) (Races in bold indicate pole position) (Races in italics indicate fastest lap)

Year	Team	1	2	3	4	5	6	7	8	9	10	11	12	DC	Points
2025	Hitech TGR	POR; 1; 2	POR; 2 Ret	POR; 3; 2	CRT; 1; 2	CRT; 2; 2	CRT; 3; 1	ARA; 1 Ret	ARA; 2; 6	ARA; 3; 11	**CAT**; **1**; 1	**CAT**; **2**; 1	CAT; 3; 8	2nd	163

=== Complete Ligier European Series results ===
(key) (Races in bold indicate pole position; results in italics indicate fastest lap)

Year	Entrant	Class	Chassis	1	2	3	4	5	6	7	8	9	10	11	Rank	Points
2025	Team Virage	JS P4	Ligier JS P4	BAR; 1	BAR; 2	LEC; 1	LEC; 2	LMS	SPA; 1	SPA; 2	SIL; 1; 1	SIL; 2; 1	ALG; 1	ALG; 2	9th	50

=== Complete Le Mans Cup results ===
(key) (Races in bold indicate pole position; results in italics indicate fastest lap)

Year	Entrant	Class	Chassis	1	2	3	4	5	6	7	Rank	Points
2025	Team Virage	LMP3 Pro-Am	Ligier JS P325	CAT	LEC	LMS; 1	LMS; 2	SPA	SIL	ALG; 8	NC	-
2026	Bretton Racing	LMP3 Pro-Am	Ligier JS P325	BAR; 1	LEC; 2	LMS; 10	SPA; 4	SIL; 6	POR; 5		4th	82

^{*} Season still in progress.
