= 2026 Porsche Carrera Cup Scandinavia =

Motor racing championship

The 2026 Porsche Carrera Cup Scandinavia was the 23rd season of the Porsche Carrera Cup Scandinavia. It began on 8 May at Anderstorp Raceway and finished on 19 September at Mantorp Park. The championship was made up of the Porsche 911 GT3 Cup (Type 992.1) with two classes for drivers, Overall and Pro-Am.

== Teams and drivers ==
Team	No.	Drivers	Class	Rounds
(Sweden) Fragus Motorsport	1	(Sweden) Daniel Ros		All
(Sweden) Fragus Motorsport	2	(Sweden) William Siverholm		All
(Sweden) Fragus Motorsport	74	(Sweden) Lukas Sundahl (Note: Ineligible to score points in Round 6 at Mantorp Park due to competing as a guest driver in that round.)		1, 3, 5–6
(Sweden) Fragus Motorsport	77	(Sweden) Per Anderson	PA	All
(Sweden) Fragus Motorsport	113	(Norway) Isabell Rustad		All
(Sweden) M3G Motorsport	4	(Sweden) Theo Jernberg		All
(Sweden) M3G Motorsport	17	(Sweden) Gustav Bergström		All
(Sweden) M3G Motorsport	69	(Denmark) Gustav Krogh		All
(Sweden) Micke Kågered Racing	7	(Sweden) Emil Persson		All
(Germany) Porsche Experience Racing	13	(Sweden) Carl Philip Bernadotte	PA	1, 4, 6
(Germany) Porsche Experience Racing	911	(Sweden) Timmy Hansen		2, 4
(Germany) Porsche Experience Racing	911	(Norway) Jan Engelbrecht	PA	3
(Germany) Porsche Experience Racing	911	(Norway) Emil Gjerdrum		5
(Germany) Porsche Experience Racing	911	(Denmark) Michelle Gatting		6
(Sweden) Mtech Competition	22	(Sweden) Albin Wärnelöv	PA	All
(Sweden) Mtech Competition	37	(Sweden) Marcus Annervi		All
(Sweden) Mtech Competition	79	(Sweden) Fredric Blank	PA	2
(Denmark) Mikkel O. Pedersen Racing	32	(Denmark) Lærke Rønn		1–3

Icon	Class
PA	Pro-Am Cup
	Guest

== Calendar ==
Round	Circuit	Date
1	Anderstorp Raceway, Anderstorp, Sweden	8–9 May
2	Karlskoga Motorstadion, Karlskoga, Sweden	30–31 May
3	Jyllands-Ringen, Silkeborg, Denmark	27–28 June
4	Karlskoga Motorstadion, Karlskoga, Sweden	14–15 August
5	Rudskogen, Rakkestad, Norway	28–29 August
6	Mantorp Park, Mantorp, Sweden	18–19 September

== Race results ==
Round		Circuit	Pole position	Fastest lap	Overall winner	Winning team	Pro-Am winner
1	R1	(Sweden) Anderstorp Raceway	(Sweden) Marcus Annervi	(Sweden) Lukas Sundahl	(Sweden) Marcus Annervi	(Sweden) Mtech Competition	(Sweden) Albin Wärnelöv
1	R2	(Sweden) Anderstorp Raceway	(Sweden) Lukas Sundahl	(Sweden) Gustav Bergström	(Sweden) Daniel Ros	(Sweden) Fragus Motorsport	(Sweden) Per Anderson
2	R3	(Sweden) Karlskoga Motorstadion	(Sweden) Daniel Ros	(Sweden) William Siverholm	(Sweden) William Siverholm	(Sweden) Fragus Motorsport	(Sweden) Albin Wärnelöv
2	R4	(Sweden) Karlskoga Motorstadion	(Sweden) Gustav Bergström	(Sweden) Gustav Bergström	(Sweden) Gustav Bergström	(Sweden) M3G Motorsport	(Sweden) Albin Wärnelöv
3	R5	(Denmark) Jyllands-Ringen	(Sweden) William Siverholm	(Sweden) William Siverholm	(Sweden) William Siverholm	(Sweden) Fragus Motorsport	(Sweden) Albin Wärnelöv
3	R6	(Denmark) Jyllands-Ringen	(Sweden) Daniel Ros	(Sweden) William Siverholm	(Sweden) Daniel Ros	(Sweden) Fragus Motorsport	(Sweden) Per Anderson
4	R7	(Sweden) Karlskoga Motorstadion	(Sweden) William Siverholm	(Sweden) William Siverholm	(Sweden) William Siverholm	(Sweden) Fragus Motorsport	(Sweden) Per Anderson
4	R8	(Sweden) Karlskoga Motorstadion	(Sweden) William Siverholm	(Sweden) William Siverholm	(Sweden) William Siverholm	(Sweden) Fragus Motorsport	(Sweden) Albin Wärnelöv
5	R9	(Norway) Rudskogen	(Sweden) William Siverholm	(Sweden) Lukas Sundahl	(Sweden) William Siverholm	(Sweden) Fragus Motorsport	(Sweden) Albin Wärnelöv
5	R10	(Norway) Rudskogen	(Sweden) William Siverholm	(Sweden) William Siverholm	(Sweden) William Siverholm	(Sweden) Fragus Motorsport	(Sweden) Albin Wärnelöv
6	R11	(Sweden) Mantorp Park	(Sweden) Daniel Ros	(Sweden) Daniel Ros	(Sweden) Marcus Annervi	(Sweden) Mtech Competition	(Sweden) Albin Wärnelöv
6	R12	(Sweden) Mantorp Park	(Sweden) Lukas Sundahl	(Sweden) William Siverholm	(Sweden) Lukas Sundahl (Note: William Siverholm originally won the race, but later received a 10-second time penalty for a false start. Marcus Annervi and Daniel Ros, who were originally classified in second and third respectively, also received 10-second time penalties for false starts. Lukas Sundahl, initially classified fourth, thus inherited the win.)	(Sweden) Fragus Motorsport	(Sweden) Albin Wärnelöv

== Championship standings ==
=== Points system ===
Championship points are awarded in each class at the finish of each event. Points are awarded based on finishing positions in the race as shown in the chart below.

Position	**1st**	**2nd**	**3rd**	**4th**	**5th**	**6th**	**7th**	**8th**	**9th**	**10th**	**11th**	**12th**	**13th**	**14th**	**15th**	Pole	FL
Points	25	20	17	14	12	10	9	8	7	6	5	4	3	2	1	1	1

=== Overall ===
Pos	Driver	Team	AND (Sweden)		KAR1 (Sweden)		JYL (Denmark)		KAR2 (Sweden)		RUD (Norway)		MAN (Sweden)		Pts
Pos	Driver	Team	R1	R2	R3	R4	R5	R6	R7	R8	R9	R10	R11	R12	Pts
1	(Sweden) William Siverholm	(Sweden) Fragus Motorsport	4	9	1	4	**1**	3	**1**	**1**	**1**	**1**	5	3	249
2	(Sweden) Daniel Ros	(Sweden) Fragus Motorsport	3	1	**2**	6	2	**1**	9	6	3	Ret	**2**	6	190
3	(Sweden) Marcus Annervi	(Sweden) Mtech Competition	**1**	4	4	2	7	Ret	12	3	5	10	1	5	165
4	(Sweden) Gustav Bergström	(Sweden) M3G Motorsport	5	3	5	**1**	6	5	2	7	4	4	6	Ret	160
5	(Denmark) Gustav Krogh	(Sweden) M3G Motorsport	6	Ret	3	3	5	4	4	2	7	5	7	2	160
6	(Sweden) Lukas Sundahl	(Sweden) Fragus Motorsport	2	**2**			4	2			2	2	3	**1** (Note: Lukas Sundahl took the overall pole position in race 2 at Mantorp Park, but he was ineligible to score points due to competing as a guest driver, so the pole position point was awarded to William Siverholm.)	117
7	(Sweden) Emil Persson	(Sweden) Micke Kågered Racing	7	6	6	DNS	3	Ret	11	9	6	3	4	7	115
8	(Sweden) Theo Jernberg	(Sweden) M3G Motorsport	12	Ret	8	9	8	6	3	4	8	6	9	8	107
9	(Sweden) Albin Wärnelöv	(Sweden) Mtech Competition	9	8	9	5	10	7	8	5	11	8	10	9	102
10	(Sweden) Per Anderson	(Sweden) Fragus Motorsport	11	7	11	8	11	8	6	11	12	9	11	11	86
11	(Norway) Isabell Rustad	(Sweden) Fragus Motorsport	8	5	10	10	9	Ret	7	8	9	7	Ret	Ret	75
12	(Sweden) Carl Philip Bernadotte	(Germany) Porsche Experience Racing	10	Ret					10	12			12	10	32
13	(Denmark) Lærke Rønn	(Denmark) Mikkel O. Pedersen Racing	Ret	10	13	12	12	9							26
14	(Sweden) Fredric Blank	(Sweden) Mtech Competition			12	11									11
Guest drivers ineligible for points
—	(Denmark) Michelle Gatting	(Germany) Porsche Experience Racing											8	4	–
—	(Sweden) Timmy Hansen	(Germany) Porsche Experience Racing			7	7			5	10					–
—	(Norway) Emil Gjerdrum	(Germany) Porsche Experience Racing									10	11			–
—	(Norway) Jan Engelbrecht	(Germany) Porsche Experience Racing					13	10							–
Pos	Driver	Team	AND (Sweden)		KAR1 (Sweden)		JYL (Denmark)		KAR2 (Sweden)		RUD (Norway)		MAN (Sweden)		Pts

Colour	Result
Gold	Winner
Silver	Second place
Bronze	Third place
Green	Points classification
Blue	Non-points classification
Blue	Non-classified finish (NC)
Purple	Retired, not classified (Ret)
Red	Did not qualify (DNQ)
Red	Did not pre-qualify (DNPQ)
Black	Disqualified (DSQ)
White	Did not start (DNS)
White	Withdrew (WD)
White	Race cancelled (C)
Blank	Did not practice (DNP)
Blank	Did not arrive (DNA)
Blank	Excluded (EX)

**Bold** – Pole

Italics – Fastest Lap

† — Did not finish, but classified

=== Pro-Am ===
Pos	Driver	Team	AND (Sweden)		KAR1 (Sweden)		JYL (Denmark)		KAR2 (Sweden)		RUD (Norway)		MAN (Sweden)		Pts
Pos	Driver	Team	R1	R2	R3	R4	R5	R6	R7	R8	R9	R10	R11	R12	Pts
1	(Sweden) Albin Wärnelöv	(Sweden) Mtech Competition	**1**	**2**	**1**	**1**	**1**	**1**	**2**	**1**	**1**	**1**	1	1	290
2	(Sweden) Per Anderson	(Sweden) Fragus Motorsport	3	1	2	2	2	2	1	2	2	2	**2**	**3**	244
3	(Sweden) Carl Philip Bernadotte	(Germany) Porsche Experience Racing	2	Ret					3	3			3	2	91
4	(Sweden) Fredric Blank	(Sweden) Mtech Competition			3	3									34
Guest drivers ineligible for points
—	(Norway) Jan Engelbrecht	(Germany) Porsche Experience Racing					3	3							–
Pos	Driver	Team	AND (Sweden)		KAR1 (Sweden)		JYL (Denmark)		KAR2 (Sweden)		RUD (Norway)		MAN (Sweden)		Pts

=== Teams ===
==== Scoring system ====
- Results for teams are awarded independently from the drivers' championship.
- Only the best two results count for teams fielding more than two entries.

Pos	Team	AND (Sweden)		KAR1 (Sweden)		JYL (Denmark)		KAR2 (Sweden)		RUD (Norway)		MAN (Sweden)		Pts
Pos	Team	R1	R2	R3	R4	R5	R6	R7	R8	R9	R10	R11	R12	Pts
1	(Sweden) Fragus Motorsport	2	1	1	4	1	1	1	1	1	1	2	3	473
1	(Sweden) Fragus Motorsport	3	2	2	6	2	2	6	6	2	2	3	6	473
2	(Sweden) M3G Motorsport	5	3	3	1	5	4	2	2	4	4	6	2	335
2	(Sweden) M3G Motorsport	6	Ret	5	3	6	5	3	4	7	5	7	8	335
3	(Sweden) Mtech Competition	1	4	4	2	7	7	8	3	5	8	1	5	266
3	(Sweden) Mtech Competition	9	8	9	5	10	Ret	12	5	11	10	10	9	266
4	(Sweden) Micke Kågered Racing	7	6	6	DNS	3	Ret	11	9	6	3	4	7	115
5	(Germany) Porsche Experience Racing	10	Ret					10	12			12	10	32
6	(Denmark) Mikkel O. Pedersen Racing	Ret	10	13	12	12	9							26
Pos	Team	AND (Sweden)		KAR1 (Sweden)		JYL (Denmark)		KAR2 (Sweden)		RUD (Norway)		MAN (Sweden)		Pts
