= 2023 F4 Danish Championship =

Motor racing competition

Seasons
- ← 2022 2024 →

The 2023 F4 Danish Championship season is the seventh season of the F4 Danish Championship. The season began at Padborg Park in April and conclude at Jyllandsringen in October. This was the last season of the championship running under the Formula 4 moniker as it was rebranded to the Nordic 4 Championship.

== Teams and drivers ==
Formula 4 entries
Team	No.	Driver	Class	Rounds
(Denmark) STEP Motorsport	5	(Denmark) Victor Nielsen		1–3, 6
(Denmark) STEP Motorsport	29	(Austria) Oscar Wurz	R	5–6
(Denmark) STEP Motorsport	37	(Algeria) Leo Robinson	R	4–6
(Denmark) BAR	7	(Denmark) Mikkel Gaarde Pedersen	R	All
(Denmark) FSP Racing	8	(Denmark) Louis Leveau	R	4–6
(Denmark) FSP Racing	33	(Denmark) Theodor Jensen		5
(Denmark) FSP Racing	99	(Denmark) Marius Kristiansen	R	6
(Denmark) Team Formula Sport	9	(Denmark) Morten Strømsted		1, 3, 5–6
(Denmark) Team Formula Sport	21	(Denmark) Mathias Bjerre Jakobsen	R	All
(Denmark) Team Formula Sport	30	(Denmark) Theodor Jensen		2–3
(Denmark) Team Formula Sport	33	(Denmark) Theodor Jensen		1
(Denmark) SD Racing	11	(Denmark) Frederik Stenå		1–5
(Denmark) MP Racing	12	(Denmark) Magnus Pedersen		All
(Denmark) LR Racing	13	(Denmark) Lærke Rønn Sørensen	R	4–6
(Denmark) Henriksen Racing	15	(Denmark) Michella Rasmussen		1–5
(Denmark) Mads Hoe Motorsport	56	(Denmark) Mille Hoe		1
Formula 5 entries
(Denmark) Leerskov Racing	4	(Denmark) Jørgen Leerskov		4–6
(Denmark) Mads Hoe Motorsport	4	(Denmark) Mads Hoe		2–3
(Denmark) Mads Hoe Motorsport	46	(Denmark) Mads Hoe		1
(Denmark) Mads Hoe Motorsport	47	(Denmark) Mads Hoe		4–6
(Denmark) Mads Hoe Motorsport	27	(Germany) Oliver Kratsch		All
(Denmark) Mads Hoe Motorsport	56	(Denmark) Mille Hoe		2–6
(Denmark) Sønderskov Motorsport	39	(Denmark) Line Sønderskov		1, 4–6
(Denmark) Rytteriet	49	(Denmark) Niels Ejnar Rytter		1, 3–6
Formula Nordic entries
(Norway) RPC Motorsport	3	(Norway) Olav Vaa		2–3, 6
(Norway) RPC Motorsport	23	(Norway) Lilo Elise Fyrileiv		2
(Norway) RPC Motorsport	33	(Norway) Carita Livrud Otterstrøm		2–3
(Norway) RPC Motorsport	40	(Norway) Birk August Larsen		6
(Norway) RPC Motorsport	44	(Norway) Andreas Vaa		2–3, 6
(Norway) RPC Motorsport	55	(Norway) Christer Otterstrøm		2–3, 6
(Sweden) Granforce Racing	16	(Sweden) Linus Granfors		2–3, 6
(Sweden) Brink Motorsports	26	(Sweden) Oscar Pedersen		2–3, 6
(Sweden) WestCoast Racing	41	(Sweden) Emma Wigroth		2–3, 6
(Sweden) Ross Racing	47	(Sweden) Jonathan Engström		2–3
(Norway) Saltvedt Racing	48	(Norway) Peder Saltvedt		3, 6
Privateer	70	(Sweden) Daniel Varverud		2–3, 6
(Sweden) Aichhorn Racing	87	(Sweden) Andreas Aichhorn		2–3, 6
(Sweden) Project F1	88	(Sweden) Viktor Molander		2–3, 6

Icon	Class
R	Rookie

== Calendar ==
The championship made two abroad visits to Sweden. For these two rounds as well as the final round in Denmark, the series combined its grid with the Swedish-based Formula Nordic.

Rnd.		Circuit/Location	Date	Supporting
1	R1	(Denmark) Padborg Park, Padborg	29–30 April	Super GT Denmark
1	R2	(Denmark) Padborg Park, Padborg	29–30 April	Super GT Denmark
1	R3	(Denmark) Padborg Park, Padborg	29–30 April	Super GT Denmark
2	R1	(Sweden) Anderstorp Raceway, Anderstorp	12–13 May	Porsche Carrera Cup Scandinavia
2	R2	(Sweden) Anderstorp Raceway, Anderstorp	12–13 May	Porsche Carrera Cup Scandinavia
3	R1	(Sweden) Karlskoga Motorstadion, Karlskoga	3–4 June	
3	R2	(Sweden) Karlskoga Motorstadion, Karlskoga	3–4 June	
3	R3	(Sweden) Karlskoga Motorstadion, Karlskoga	3–4 June	
4	R1	(Denmark) Ring Djursland, Pederstrup	2–3 September	
4	R2	(Denmark) Ring Djursland, Pederstrup	2–3 September	
4	R3	(Denmark) Ring Djursland, Pederstrup	2–3 September	
4	R4	(Denmark) Ring Djursland, Pederstrup	2–3 September	
5	R1	(Denmark) Padborg Park, Padborg	15–16 September	Super GT Denmark; TCR Denmark
5	R2	(Denmark) Padborg Park, Padborg	15–16 September	Super GT Denmark; TCR Denmark
5	R3	(Denmark) Padborg Park, Padborg	15–16 September	Super GT Denmark; TCR Denmark
6	R1	(Denmark) Jyllands-Ringen, Silkeborg	30 September–1 October	TCR Denmark
6	R2	(Denmark) Jyllands-Ringen, Silkeborg	30 September–1 October	TCR Denmark
6	R3	(Denmark) Jyllands-Ringen, Silkeborg	30 September–1 October	TCR Denmark

== Race results ==
Rnd.		Circuit	Overall			Formula 5
Rnd.		Circuit	Pole position	Fastest lap	Winning driver	Winning driver
1	R1	(Denmark) Padborg Park	(Denmark) Theodor Jensen	(Denmark) Mikkel Gaarde Pedersen	(Denmark) Theodor Jensen	(Denmark) Mads Hoe
1	R2	(Denmark) Padborg Park		(Denmark) Mikkel Gaarde Pedersen	(Denmark) Mikkel Gaarde Pedersen	(Denmark) Niels Ejnar Rytter
1	R3	(Denmark) Padborg Park		(Denmark) Mikkel Gaarde Pedersen	(Denmark) Mikkel Gaarde Pedersen	(Denmark) Mads Hoe
2	R1	(Sweden) Anderstorp Raceway	(Denmark) Magnus Pedersen	(Denmark) Mikkel Gaarde Pedersen	(Denmark) Magnus Pedersen	(Denmark) Mads Hoe
2	R2	(Sweden) Anderstorp Raceway		(Denmark) Magnus Pedersen	(Denmark) Mikkel Gaarde Pedersen	(Denmark) Mads Hoe
3	R1	(Sweden) Karlskoga Motorstadion	(Denmark) Mikkel Gaarde Pedersen	(Denmark) Mathias Bjerre Jakobsen	(Denmark) Magnus Pedersen	(Germany) Oliver Kratsch
3	R2	(Sweden) Karlskoga Motorstadion		(Denmark) Magnus Pedersen	(Denmark) Magnus Pedersen	(Denmark) Mads Hoe
3	R3	(Sweden) Karlskoga Motorstadion		(Denmark) Mikkel Gaarde Pedersen	(Denmark) Mikkel Gaarde Pedersen	(Germany) Oliver Kratsch
4	R1	(Denmark) Ring Djursland	(Denmark) Mads Hoe	(Denmark) Mathias Bjerre Jakobsen	(Denmark) Mathias Bjerre Jakobsen	(Germany) Oliver Kratsch
4	R2	(Denmark) Ring Djursland		(Denmark) Mads Hoe	(Denmark) Magnus Pedersen	(Denmark) Mads Hoe
4	R3	(Denmark) Ring Djursland		(Algeria) Leo Robinson	(Denmark) Mikkel Gaarde Pedersen	(Germany) Oliver Kratsch
4	R4	(Denmark) Ring Djursland		(Denmark) Mathias Bjerre Jakobsen	(Denmark) Mikkel Gaarde Pedersen	(Germany) Oliver Kratsch
5	R1	(Denmark) Padborg Park	(Denmark) Theodor Jensen	(Denmark) Theodor Jensen	(Denmark) Theodor Jensen	(Denmark) Mads Hoe
5	R2	(Denmark) Padborg Park		(Denmark) Theodor Jensen	(Denmark) Theodor Jensen	(Denmark) Mads Hoe
5	R3	(Denmark) Padborg Park		(Denmark) Magnus Pedersen	(Denmark) Theodor Jensen	(Denmark) Mads Hoe
6	R1	(Denmark) Jyllandsringen	(Denmark) Mikkel Gaarde Pedersen	(Denmark) Mathias Bjerre Jakobsen	(Denmark) Magnus Pedersen	(Denmark) Mads Hoe
6	R2	(Denmark) Jyllandsringen		(Denmark) Mikkel Gaarde Pedersen	(Denmark) Mathias Bjerre Jakobsen	(Germany) Oliver Kratsch
6	R3	(Denmark) Jyllandsringen		(Algeria) Leo Robinson	(Denmark) Magnus Pedersen	(Germany) Oliver Kratsch

== Championship standings ==
Points are awarded to the top 10 classified finishers in each race. No points are awarded for pole position or fastest lap.

Position	**1st**	**2nd**	**3rd**	**4th**	**5th**	**6th**	**7th**	**8th**	**9th**	**10th**
Points	25	18	15	12	10	8	6	4	2	1

=== Drivers' standings ===
Pos	Driver	PAD1 (Denmark)			AND (Sweden)		KAR (Sweden)			DJU (Denmark)				PAD2 (Denmark)			JYL (Denmark)			Pts
Pos	Driver	R1	R2	R3	R1	R2	R1	R2	R3	R1	R2	R3	R4	R1	R2	R3	R1	R2	R3	Pts
1	(Denmark) Mikkel Gaarde Pedersen **(R)**	3	1	1	2	1	**DNS**	9	1	3	5	1	1	2	5	3	**Ret**	7	5	279
2	(Denmark) Magnus Pedersen	4	3	2	**1**	2	2	1	2	8	1	4	Ret	6	15	4	1	8	1	275
3	(Denmark) Mathias Bjerre Jakobsen **(R)**	2	4	Ret	5	4	Ret	2	6	1	11	3	2	5	3	5	25	1	3	217
4	(Algeria) Leo Robinson **(R)**									2	3	2	3	3	2	2	3	3	2	165
5	(Denmark) Victor Nielsen	5	2	4	6	3	4	4	5								2	4	4	155
6	(Denmark) Mads Hoe **(F5)**	6	9	3	3	6	10	6	DNS	**Ret**	2	DNS	WD	4	4	7	4	Ret	16	134
7	(Denmark) Theodor Jensen	**1**	5	Ret	18†	DNS	WD	WD	WD					**1**	1	1				112
8	(Germany) Oliver Kratsch **(F5)**	8	Ret	7	19	Ret	5	7	9	7	Ret	5	6	10	8	10	11	9	13	87
9	(Denmark) Mille Hoe **(F5)**	9	6	5	13	12	11	14	16	9	9	7	8	13	11	13	20	16	21	74
10	(Denmark) Frederik Stenå	7	Ret	6	15	13	15	15	17	6	6	DSQ	7	12	10	12				65
11	(Denmark) Lærke Rønn Sørensen **(R)**									4	4	10†	5	8	7	9	10	10	12	59
12	(Austria) Oscar Wurz **(R)**													7	6	8	5	2	7	52
13	(Denmark) Louis Leveau **(R)**									5	7	9†	4	9	9	6	13	11	8	50
14	(Denmark) Michella Rasmussen	13	11	11	14	14	17	16	18	11	10	8	10	16	14	17				26
15	(Denmark) Niels Ejnar Rytter **(F5)**	12	8	9			18	19	20	10	8	6	9	Ret	12	14	22	19	19	24
16	(Denmark) Morten Strømsted	10	7	8			16	17	19					11	Ret	11	15	15	17	22
17	(Denmark) Marius Kristiansen **(R)**																6	Ret	6	16
18	(Denmark) Line Sønderskov **(F5)**	11	10	10						WD	WD	WD	WD	14	13	15	21	20	Ret	2
19	(Denmark) Jørgen Leerskov **(F5)**									12	12	Ret	WD	15	Ret	16	23	21	18	0
Formula Nordic entries
–	(Sweden) Linus Granfors				4	5	1	3	3								7	6	15	–
–	(Norway) Christer Otterstrøm				8	Ret	3	5	4								8	5	20	–
–	(Sweden) Oscar Pedersen				Ret	Ret	6	8	7								9	12	Ret	–
–	(Sweden) Jonathan Engström				7	7	Ret	DNS	10											–
–	(Norway) Olav Vaa				11	11	7	10	14								DSQ	DSQ	EX	–
–	(Sweden) Emma Wigroth				9	9	8	13	13								16	17	14	–
–	(Sweden) Daniel Varverud				10	8	9	11	11								12	13	9	–
–	(Norway) Carita Livrud Otterstrøm				12	10	Ret	20	8											–
–	(Norway) Peder Saltvedt						12	12	12								14	14	10	–
–	(Sweden) Andreas Aichhorn				16	15	14	18	Ret								17	18	11	–
–	(Norway) Andreas Vaa				Ret	17	13	Ret	15								19	24	WD	–
–	(Sweden) Viktor Molander				17	16	Ret	DNS	DNS								24	23	23	–
–	(Norway) Birk August Larsen																18	22	22	–
–	(Norway) Lilo Fyrileiv				Ret	DNS														–
Pos	Driver	R1	R2	R3	R1	R2	R1	R2	R3	R1	R2	R3	R4	R1	R2	R3	R1	R2	R3	Pts
Pos	Driver	PAD1 (Denmark)			AND (Sweden)		KAR (Sweden)			DJU (Denmark)				PAD2 (Denmark)			JYL (Denmark)			Pts

Colour	Result
Gold	Winner
Silver	Second place
Bronze	Third place
Green	Points classification
Blue	Non-points classification
Blue	Non-classified finish (NC)
Purple	Retired, not classified (Ret)
Red	Did not qualify (DNQ)
Red	Did not pre-qualify (DNPQ)
Black	Disqualified (DSQ)
White	Did not start (DNS)
White	Withdrew (WD)
White	Race cancelled (C)
Blank	Did not practice (DNP)
Blank	Did not arrive (DNA)
Blank	Excluded (EX)

**Bold** – Pole
Italics – Fastest Lap

- † – Driver did not finish the race, but was classified as they completed over 75% of the race distance.
