= Mikkel Gaarde Pedersen =

Danish racing driver (born 2008)

- Pedersen at Silverstone Circuit in 2026.
- Nationality: (Denmark) Danish
- Born: 30 September 2008 (age 18) Egernsund, Denmark

European Le Mans Series career
- Debut season: 2025
- Current team: Rinaldi Racing
- Categorisation: FIA Silver
- Car number: 5
- Former teams: DKR Engineering
- Starts: 12
- Wins: 1
- Podiums: 4
- Poles: 0
- Fastest laps: 0
- Best finish: 3rd (LMP3) in 2026

Championship titles
- 2023: F4 Danish Championship

Mikkel Gaarde Pedersen (born 30 September 2008) is a Danish racing driver who last competed for Rinaldi Racing in the LMP3 class of the European Le Mans Series and Le Mans Cup.

== Career ==
Pedersen began karting at the age of six, competing until 2022. In his karting career, Pedersen most notably was runner-up in the junior class of the Rotax Max Challenge Germany standings in 2022, and also was third in the Karting Sprint Cup Junior discipline of the FIA Motorsport Games the same year while representing Denmark.

In late 2022, Pedersen made his single-seater debut, racing in the final round of that year's F4 Danish Championship at Jyllands-Ringen for GP Racing, in which he scored a best result of fourth in race one. Returning to the series the following year for BAR, Pedersen began the season by winning twice in the opening round at Padborg Park and winning race two at Anderstorp Raceway to take an early championship lead. After winning race three at Karlskoga a round later, Pedersen scored what turned out to be his final two wins of the season at Ring Djursland, before scoring two podiums in the final two rounds to secure the series title by four points over Magnus Pedersen.

Remaining in Formula 4 for 2024, Pedersen joined Drivex to compete in both the Formula Winter Series and the F4 Spanish Championship. In the former, Pedersen scored his only podium of the season in race three at Jerez by finishing second, and scored four more points finishes to end the winter eighth in points. In the latter, Pedersen scored points twice, taking a best result of eighth in race two at Aragón before leaving the team and the series with three rounds remaining. After leaving Drivex, Pedersen made his prototype debut in the JS P4 class of the Ligier European Series for Team Virage at the season-ending round at Algarve alongside Brandon McCaughan. The pair finished fourth and fifth in the two races. At the same venue, Pedersen partook in the European Le Mans Series rookie tests with DKR Engineering as he tested LMP3 machinery for the first time.

Stepping up to full-time LMP3 competition the following year, Pedersen joined DKR Engineering to race in the European Le Mans Series alongside Antti Rammo and Wyatt Brichacek. In his rookie season in the series, Pedersen scored his maiden podium at the season-ending race at Algarve by finishing third, on his way to a tenth-place points finish. During 2025, Pedersen also made a one-off appearance in the 24 Hours of Le Mans-supporting round of the Le Mans Cup in the LMP3 Pro-Am class for Rinaldi Racing, and partook in the European Le Mans Series rookie tests with R-ace GP in the LMP3 class.

The following year, Pedersen returned to Rinaldi for a dual campaign in the LMP3 classes of the European Le Mans Series and Le Mans Cup. In ELMS, Pedersen won at Barcelona and Spa, albeit the latter was taken away on technical grounds, as well as taking two other podiums to secure third in points. In the latter, Pedersen took a lone win at Silverstone and four other podiums to secure runner-up honours in LMP3 Pro-Am. During 2026, Pedersen also made his GT3 debut at the 24 Hours of Spa for Corvette-fielding Steller Motorsport. At the end of the year, Pedersen joined AMG-fielding Craft-Bamboo Iron Lynx to race in the GT3 class of the 2026–27 Asian Le Mans Series.

== Karting record ==
=== Karting career summary ===
| Season | Series | Team | Position |
|---|---|---|---|
| 2017 | Hungarian International Open – Micro Max | RS Competition | 39th |
| 2017 | Rotax Max Challenge Grand Finals – Micro Max | Tom Gaarde Pedersen | 27th |
| 2018 | WSK Champions Cup – 60 Mini | RS Competition | NC |
| 2018 | WSK Super Master Series – 60 Mini | RS Competition | 90th |
| 2018 | WSK Final Cup – 60 Mini | Baby Race Driver Academy | 19th |
| 2019 | WSK Champions Cup – 60 Mini | Baby Race Driver Academy | 29th |
| 2019 | WSK Super Master Series – 60 Mini | Baby Race Driver Academy | 33rd |
| 2019 | 24° South Garda Winter Cup – Mini ROK | Baby Race Driver Academy | NC |
| 2019 | WSK Euro Series – 60 Mini | Baby Race Driver Academy | 53rd |
| 2020 | Rotax Max Challenge Germany – Junior | | 13th |
| 2020 | Rotax Max Euro Trophy – Junior Max | RS Competition | 30th |
| 2020 | BNL Karting Series - Kick-Off – Junior Max | | 33rd |
| 2021 | Rotax Max Challenge Germany – Junior | | 4th |
| 2021 | Rotax Max Euro Trophy – Junior Max | RS Competition | 11th |
| 2021 | Rotax Max Euro Golden Trophy – Junior Max | JJ Racing | 5th |
| 2022 | Rotax Max Winter Trophy – Junior Max | JJ Racing | 10th |
| 2022 | Rotax Max Challenge Germany – Junior | JJ Racing | 2nd |
| 2022 | Rotax Max Euro Trophy – Junior Max | JJ Racing | 10th |
| 2022 | Rotax Max Challenge International Trophy – Junior Max | JJ Racing | 4th |
| 2022 | Rotax Max Challenge Grand Finals – Junior Max | JJ Racing | 19th |
| 2022 | FIA Motorsport Games Karting Sprint Cup Junior | Team Denmark | 3rd |

== Racing record ==
=== Racing career summary ===
| Season | Series | Team | Races | Wins | Poles | F/Laps | Podiums | Points | Position |
|---|---|---|---|---|---|---|---|---|---|
| 2022 | F4 Danish Championship | GP Racing | 3 | 0 | 0 | 0 | 0 | 22 | 16th |
| 2023 | F4 Danish Championship | BAR | 17 | 6 | 2 | 6 | 11 | 279 | **1st** |
| 2023 | Formula Nordic | BAR | 7 | 2 | 0 | 0 | 3 | —N/a | NC† |
| 2024 | Formula Winter Series | Drivex | 11 | 0 | 0 | 1 | 1 | 55 | 8th |
| 2024 | F4 Spanish Championship | Drivex | 12 | 0 | 0 | 0 | 0 | 3 | 23rd |
| 2024 | Ligier European Series – JS P4 | Team Virage | 2 | 0 | 0 | 0 | 0 | 22 | 13th |
| 2025 | European Le Mans Series – LMP3 | DKR Engineering | 6 | 0 | 0 | 0 | 1 | 41 | 10th |
| 2025 | European Endurance Prototype Cup | Racing Spirit of Léman | 1 | 0 | 0 | 0 | 0 | 0.5 | 63rd |
| 2025 | Le Mans Cup – LMP3 Pro-Am | Rinaldi Racing | 2 | 0 | 0 | 1 | 0 | 4 | 28th |
| 2026 | European Le Mans Series – LMP3 | Rinaldi Racing | 6 | 1 | 0 | 0 | 3 | 77 | **3rd** |
| 2026 | Le Mans Cup – LMP3 Pro-Am | Rinaldi Racing | 6 | 1 | 0 | 2 | 5 | 113 | **2nd** |
| 2026 | GT World Challenge Europe Endurance Cup | Steller Motorsport | 1 | 0 | 0 | 0 | 0 | 0 | NC |
| 2026 | GT World Challenge Europe Endurance Cup – Gold | Steller Motorsport | 1 | 0 | 0 | 0 | 0 | 12 | 20th |
| 2026 | Intercontinental GT Challenge | Steller Motorsport | 1 | 0 | 0 | 0 | 0 | 0 | NC |
| 2026 | European Endurance Prototype Cup | Lamo Racing Car | | | | | | | |
| 2026–27 | Asian Le Mans Series – GT3 | Craft-Bamboo Iron Lynx | | | | | | * | * |

^{†} As Pedersen was a guest driver, he was ineligible for championship points.
^{*} Season still in progress.

=== Complete F4 Danish Championship results ===
(key) (Races in bold indicate pole position) (Races in italics indicate fastest lap)

| Year | Team | 1 | 2 | 3 | 4 | 5 | 6 | 7 | 8 | 9 | 10 | 11 | 12 | 13 | 14 | 15 | 16 | 17 | 18 | 19 | DC | Points |
|---|---|---|---|---|---|---|---|---|---|---|---|---|---|---|---|---|---|---|---|---|---|---|
| 2022 | GP Racing | PAD1; 1 | PAD1; 2 | PAD1; 3 | STU; 1 | STU; 2 | STU; 3 | JYL1; 1 | JYL1; 2 | JYL1; 3 | DJU; 1 | DJU; 2 | DJU; 3 | DJU; 4 | PAD2; 1 | PAD2; 2 | PAD2; 3 | JYL2; 1; 4 | JYL2; 2 Ret | JYL2; 3; 5 | 16th | 22 |
| 2023 | BAR | PAD1; 1; 3 | PAD1; 2; 1 | PAD1; 3; 1 | AND; 1; 2 | AND; 2; 1 | **KAR**; **1** DNS | KAR; 2; 9 | KAR; 3; 1 | DJU; 1; 3 | DJU; 2; 5 | DJU; 3; 1 | DJU; 4; 1 | PAD2; 1; 2 | PAD2; 2; 5 | PAD2; 3; 3 | **JYL**; **1** Ret | JYL; 2; 7 | JYL; 3; 5 | | 1st | 279 |

=== Complete Formula Winter Series results ===
(key) (Races in bold indicate pole position; races in italics indicate fastest lap)

| Year | Team | 1 | 2 | 3 | 4 | 5 | 6 | 7 | 8 | 9 | 10 | 11 | 12 | DC | Points |
|---|---|---|---|---|---|---|---|---|---|---|---|---|---|---|---|
| 2024 | Drivex | JER; 1; 8 | JER; 2; 5 | JER; 3; 2 | CRT; 1 DSQ | CRT; 2; 31 | CRT; 3 Ret | ARA; 1; 13 | ARA; 2; 4 | ARA; 3; 5 | CAT; 1 C | CAT; 2; 12 | CAT; 3; 18 | 8th | 55 |

=== Complete F4 Spanish Championship results ===
(key) (Races in bold indicate pole position; races in italics indicate fastest lap)

| Year | Team | 1 | 2 | 3 | 4 | 5 | 6 | 7 | 8 | 9 | 10 | 11 | 12 | 13 | 14 | 15 | 16 | 17 | 18 | 19 | 20 | 21 | DC | Points |
|---|---|---|---|---|---|---|---|---|---|---|---|---|---|---|---|---|---|---|---|---|---|---|---|---|
| 2024 | Drivex | JAR; 1; 16 | JAR; 2; 29 | JAR; 3; 27 | POR; 1; 33† | POR; 2; 12 | POR; 3; 12 | LEC; 1; 27 | LEC; 2; 14 | LEC; 3; 22 | ARA; 1; 11 | ARA; 2; 8 | ARA; 3; 18 | CRT; 1 | CRT; 2 | CRT; 3 | JER; 1 | JER; 2 | JER; 3 | CAT; 1 | CAT; 2 | CAT; 3 | 23rd | 3 |

=== Complete Ligier European Series results ===
(key) (Races in bold indicate pole position; results in italics indicate fastest lap)

| Year | Entrant | Class | Chassis | 1 | 2 | 3 | 4 | 5 | 6 | 7 | 8 | 9 | 10 | 11 | Rank | Points |
|---|---|---|---|---|---|---|---|---|---|---|---|---|---|---|---|---|
| 2024 | Team Virage | JS P4 | Ligier JS P4 | CAT; 1 | CAT; 2 | LEC; 1 | LEC; 2 | LMS | SPA; 1 | SPA; 2 | MUG; 1 | MUG; 2 | ALG; 1; 4 | ALG; 2; 5 | 13th | 22 |

=== Complete European Le Mans Series results ===
(key) (Races in bold indicate pole position; results in italics indicate fastest lap)

| Year | Entrant | Class | Chassis | Engine | 1 | 2 | 3 | 4 | 5 | 6 | Rank | Points |
|---|---|---|---|---|---|---|---|---|---|---|---|---|
| 2025 | DKR Engineering | LMP3 | Ginetta G61-LT-P3 Evo | Toyota V35A 3.5 L V6 | CAT; Ret | LEC; 5 | IMO; 8 | SPA; 8 | MUG; 6 | ALG; 3 | 10th | 41 |
| 2026 | Rinaldi Racing | LMP3 | Ligier JS P325 | Toyota V35A 3.5 L V6 | CAT; 1 | LEC; 7 | IMO; 2 | SPA; DSQ | SIL; 5 | ALG; 2 | 3rd | 77 |

^{*} Season still in progress.

=== Complete Le Mans Cup results ===
(key) (Races in bold indicate pole position; results in italics indicate fastest lap)

| Year | Entrant | Class | Chassis | 1 | 2 | 3 | 4 | 5 | 6 | 7 | Rank | Points |
|---|---|---|---|---|---|---|---|---|---|---|---|---|
| 2025 | Rinaldi Racing | LMP3 Pro-Am | Ligier JS P325 | CAT | LEC | LMS; 1; 7 | LMS; 2 Ret | SPA | SIL | ALG | 28th | 4 |
| 2026 | Rinaldi Racing | LMP3 Pro-Am | Ligier JS P325 | BAR; 2 | LEC; 3 | LMS; 3 | SPA; 5 | SIL; 1 | POR; 2 | | 2nd | 113 |

^{*} Season still in progress.

=== Complete GT World Challenge Europe results ===
==== GT World Challenge Europe Endurance Cup ====
(Races in bold indicate pole position) (Races in italics indicate fastest lap)

| Year | Team | Car | Class | 1 | 2 | 3 | 4 | 5 | 6 | 7 | Pos. | Points |
|---|---|---|---|---|---|---|---|---|---|---|---|---|
| 2026 | Steller Motorsport | Chevrolet Corvette Z06 GT3.R | Gold | LEC | MNZ | SPA; 6H; 58 | SPA; 12H; 45 | SPA; 24H; 41 | NÜR | ALG | 20th | 12 |

^{*} Season still in progress.

=== Complete Asian Le Mans Series results ===
(key) (Races in bold indicate pole position) (Races in italics indicate fastest lap)

| Year | Team | Class | Car | Engine | 1 | 2 | 3 | 4 | 5 | 6 | Pos. | Points |
|---|---|---|---|---|---|---|---|---|---|---|---|---|
| 2026–27 | Craft-Bamboo Iron Lynx | GT | Mercedes-AMG GT3 Evo | Mercedes-AMG M159 6.2 L V8 | LEC; 1; 2 | LEC; 2; 15 | JER; 1 | JER; 2 | ALG; 1 | ALG; 2 | 4th* | 18* |
