= Rudskogen =

Asphalt race circuit in Norway

Rudskogen Motorpark
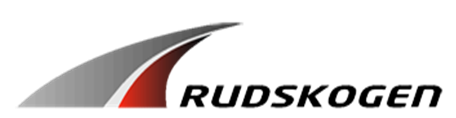

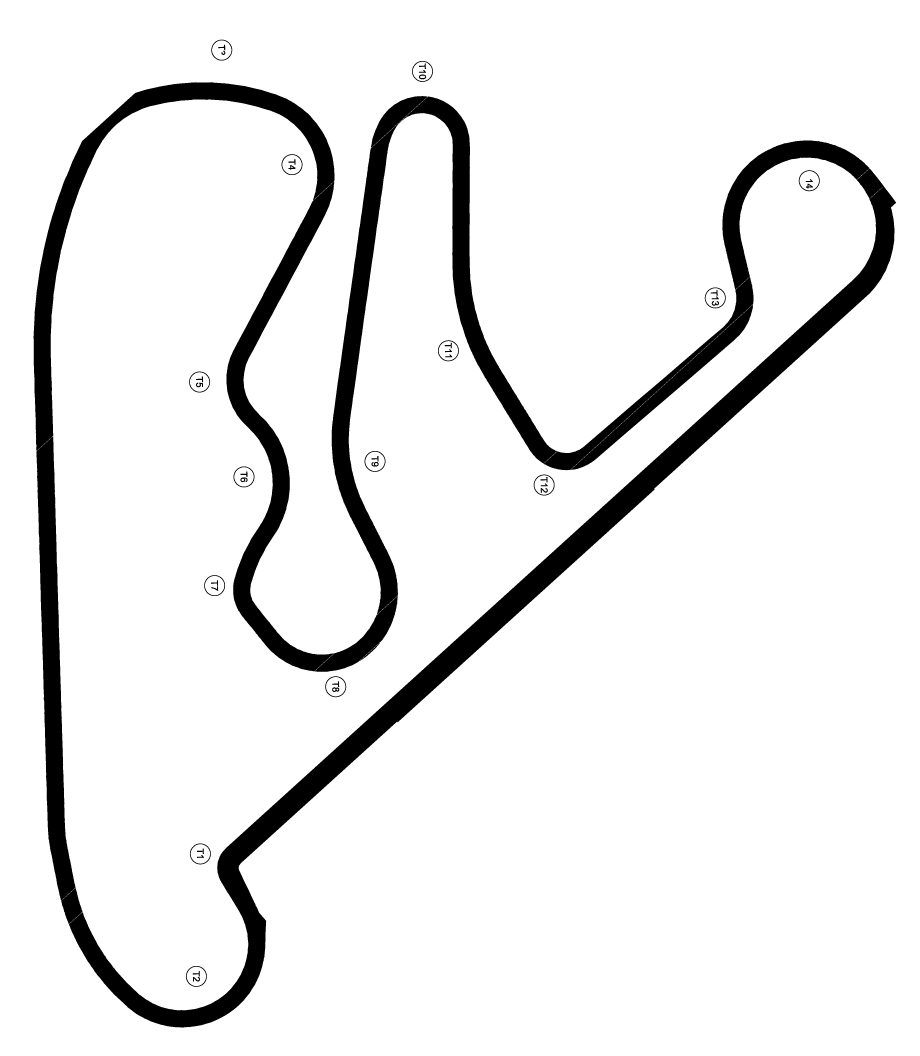
- Full Circuit (2012–present)
- Location: Rakkestad, Norway
- Coordinates: 59°22′0″N 11°15′42″E
- Opened: 20 May 1990; 36 years ago
- Major events: Current: PSC Scandinavia (2017–2019, 2021–present); Nordic 4 (2018, 2026); Former: TCR Denmark (2024); GT4 Scandinavia (2023); STCC (2018); NTCC (2002–2004)

Full Circuit (2012–present)
- Length: 3.254 km (2.022 mi)
- Turns: 14
- Race lap record: 1:23.179 ( (Denmark) Henrik Vejen, PVP Superkart, 2014, Superkart)

Original Circuit (1990–2011)
- Length: 1.901 km (1.181 mi)
- Turns: 10
- Race lap record: 0:53.380 ( (Sweden) Pontus Mörth, Ralt RT33, 1996, F3)

Rudskogen Motorsenter is Norway’s oldest asphalt race circuit, opened on May 20, 1990. It has hosted rounds of the TCR Scandinavia Touring Car Championship, Danish Thundersport Championship, Swedish GT Series, NBF GT Championship, GT4 Scandinavia, Danish Super GT, V8 Thunder Cars, Formula STCC Nordic and F4 Danish Championship.

In 2006 the Norwegian government selected Rudskogen Motorsenter as the main national motorsport facility. The venue was rebuilt by Hermann Tilke and re-opened in 2012.

The current motorcycle and car racing track at Rudskogen Motorsenter is 3.254 km (2.022 mi) long, set in rolling forest terrain and considered technically demanding for drivers. The longest straight is 640 m (2,100 ft) and the elevation difference is 42 m (138 ft). Races for cars and bikes are arranged there in a variety of classes and the track is also hired out privately for corporate events and organisational training, for example for emergency services personnel.

The Rudskogen karting track, located at the same facility, is 1.2 km (0.75 mi) long and satisfies international karting standards. A range of large-scale events have taken place at this track including a round of the European Karting Championship in 2005.

Data from the Norwegian Meteorological Institute shows that the circuit at Rudskogen can be in use for 8 weeks longer per year than other existing race circuits in Norway, because of the southerly location.

== Lap records ==
Marc Gené held the unofficial lap record with a lap of 1:09.507 with Ferrari F10 in a demonstration event in 2013. As of August 2026, the fastest official race lap records at the Rudskogen are listed as:

Category	Time	Driver	Vehicle	Event
Full Circuit (2012–present): 3.254 km (2.022 mi)
Superkart	1:23.179	Henrik Vejen	PVP Superkart	2014 Rudskogen Norwegian Superkart round
Porsche Carrera Cup	1:23.625	Lukas Sundahl	Porsche 911 (992 I) GT3 Cup	2026 Rudskogen Porsche Carrera Cup Scandinavia round
Formula 4	1.25.606	Casper Tobias Hansen	Mygale M14-F4	2018 Rudskogen Danish F4 round
Formula Ford	1.26.249	Martin Harritz Nielsen	Mygale SJ07	2018 Rudskogen Danish F4 round
Formula Renault 1.6	1:26.419	Benjamin Fuglesang	Signatech FR1.6	2022 Rudskogen Formula Nordic round
GT4	1:27.169	Philipp Frommenwiler	Porsche 718 Cayman GT4 RS Clubsport	2025 Rudskogen Porsche Sprint Challenge Scandinavia round
TCR Touring Car	1.29.854	Mike Halder	Honda Civic Type R TCR (FL5)	2024 Rudskogen TCR Denmark round
Original Circuit (1990–2011): 1.901 km (1.181 mi)
Formula Three	0:53.380	Pontus Mörth	Ralt RT33	1996 Rudskogen Nordic F3 round
