= Karlskoga Motorstadion =

Auto racing venue in Karlskoga, Sweden

Gelleråsen Arena
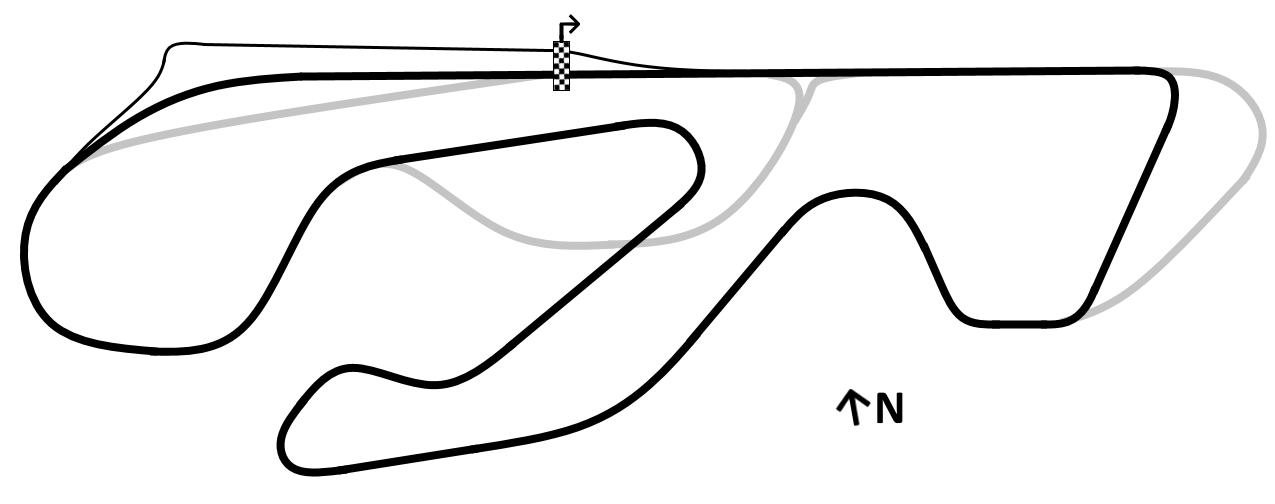
- Full Circuit (2006–2016)
- Location: Gelleråsen, Karlskoga Municipality, Sweden
- Coordinates: 59°23′00″N 14°30′58″E
- Opened: 1949
- Former names: Karlskoga Motorstadion
- Major events: Current: Kanonloppet (1950–1975, 1996–present); Porsche Carrera Cup Scandinavia (2004–2011, 2013, 2015–present); Nordic 4 (2023–present); Future: STCC (1996–2011, 2013, 2015–2022, 2027); Former: Grand Prix motorcycle racing Swedish motorcycle Grand Prix (1978–1979); Sidecar World Championship (1979, 2006); NXT Gen Cup (2023); GT4 Scandinavia (2019–2022); TTA – Racing Elite League (2012); European F2 (1973–1974); European F3 (1978); ETCC (1964–1966)
- Website: gellerasen.se

Full Circuit (2017–present)
- Length: 2.350 km (1.460 mi)
- Turns: 11
- Race lap record: 1:03.470 ( (Sweden) Lukas Sundahl, Porsche 911 (992 I) GT3 Cup, 2024, Carrera Cup)

Full Circuit (2006–2016)
- Length: 2.400 km (1.491 mi)
- Turns: 11
- Race lap record: 1:01.841 ( (Sweden) Daniel Roos, Tatuus FR2000, 2009, FR 2.0)

Full Circuit (1992–2005)
- Length: 2.530 km (1.572 mi)
- Turns: 11
- Race lap record: 1:03.634 ( (Germany) Frank Kechele, Tatuus FR2000, 2004, FR 2.0)

Full Circuit (1958–1991)
- Length: 3.000 km (1.864 mi)
- Turns: 11
- Race lap record: 1:12.100 ( (France) Patrick Depailler, March 742, 1974, F2)

Full Circuit (1953–1957)
- Length: 2.000 km (1.243 mi)
- Turns: 10

Original Circuit (1950–1952)
- Length: 1.600 km (0.994 mi)
- Turns: 9

Karlskoga Motorstadion, also known as Gelleråsen Arena, is a motorsport race track in Gelleråsen, Karlskoga Municipality, Sweden. The circuit is located 6 km (3.7 mi) north of Karlskoga and 50 km (31 mi) west of Örebro, and is the oldest permanent track in the country. The layout is such that the whole track can be seen from all spectator areas.

It is currently authorised for European Championship rounds of road racing and Swedish Touring Car Championship events.

== History ==
Built in 1949 as a 1.550 km (0.963 mi) dirt track, the inaugural race was the first Kanonloppet on 4 June 1950. For the second Kanonloppet in 1952, the surface had been paved with asphalt and the length was 1.600 km (0.994 mi). It was extended to 2.000 km (1.243 mi) in 1953 with the addition of the Björkdungskurvan section (later renamed to Tröskurvan). In 1958 it was additionally extended to 3.172 km (1.971 mi) with the Velodromkurvan section (Velodrome bend).

In 1961, 1962 and 1963 non-championship Formula One events were hosted here, which saw the likes of Stirling Moss, Jim Clark and Jack Brabham battle it out on-track. 1967 a race called Swedish Grand Prix was held there, won by Jackie Stewart. In 1979, the circuit hosted the Swedish motorcycle Grand Prix won by Barry Sheene.

The circuit was forced to close for two years after a crash on 8 August 1970 during a touring car event. Two cars, a Ford Escort and a BMW 2002, locked together at the flat out right hander before the straight leading up to the Velodromkurvan, and went off the track at high speed, bounced over the banking and into the crowd, killing five spectators.

After a period of decay, the track went through major renovation work during the 1990s and 2000s. In 1992, the track length was shortened to 2.530 km (1.572 mi).

The pit area was moved and the facilities were improved. There was also several safety improvements, including a redesign of the Tröskurvan and the complete removal of the velodrome section. This shortened the track to its current length of 2.400 km (1.491 mi). In 2017, the last corner was modified and the track length was shortened to 2.350 km (1.460 mi).

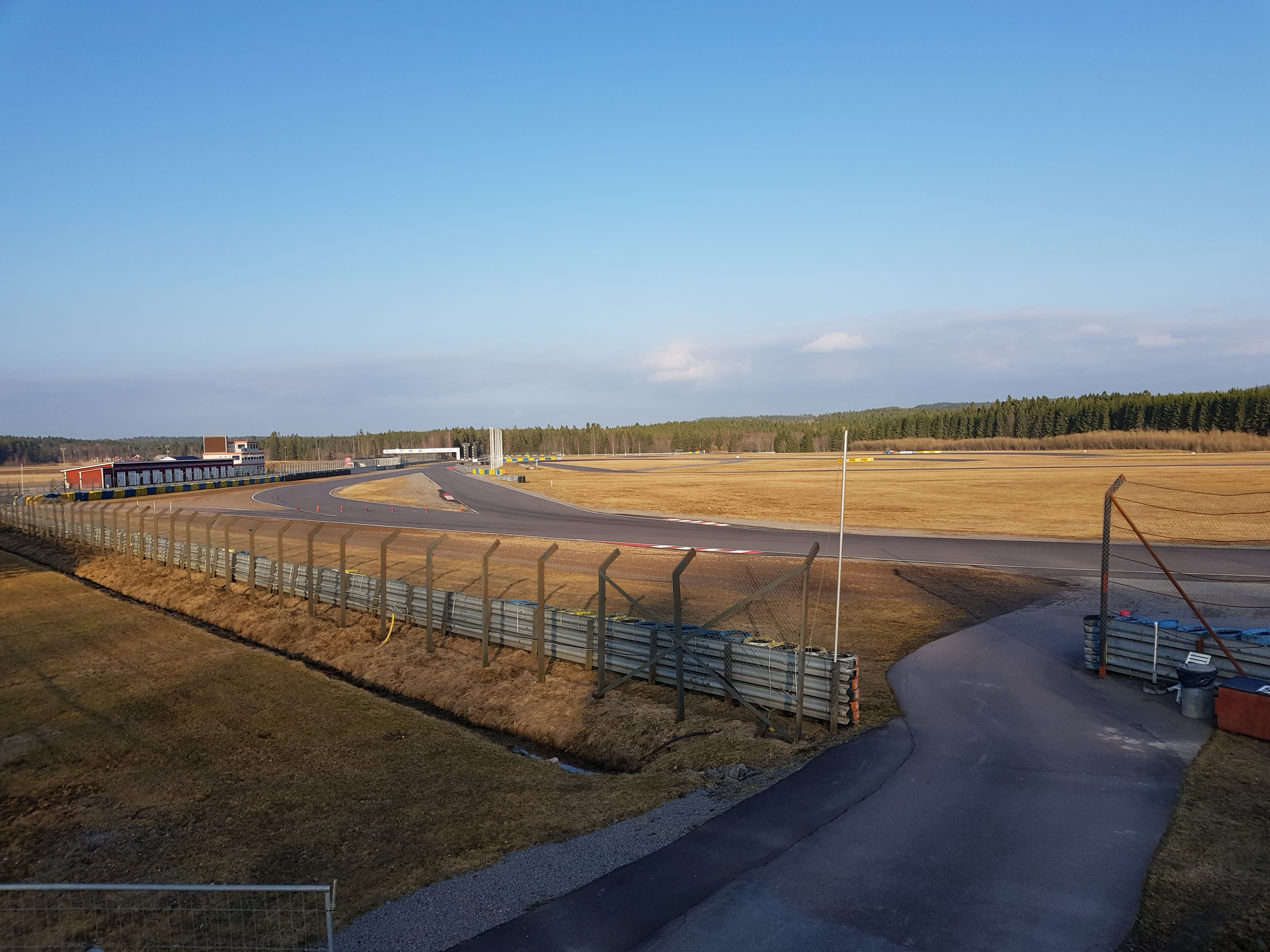
Photo from the track

== Lap records ==
As of May 2026, the fastest official race lap records at the Karlskoga Motorstadion are listed as:

Category	Time	Driver	Vehicle	Event
Full Circuit (2017–present): 2.350 km (1.460 mi)
Porsche Carrera Cup	1:03.470	Lukas Sundahl	Porsche 911 (992 I) GT3 Cup	2024 2nd Karlskoga Porsche Carrera Cup Scandinavia round
Superbike	1:03.723	Christoffer Bergman	Yamaha YZF-R1	2023 1st Karlskoga Pro Superbike round
Formula 4	1:04.730	Mikkel Gaarde Pedersen	Mygale M14-F4	2023 Karlskoga F4 Danish Championship round
Formula Renault 1.6	1:04.918	Linus Granfors	Signatech FR1.6	2023 Karlskoga Formula Nordic round
Formula Nova	1:05.917	Richard Olson	Aquila Formula Nova	2026 Karlskoga Nordic 4 round
Supersport	1:06.042	Sebastian Losciale	Honda CBR600RR	2023 1st Karlskoga Pro Superbike SSP round
GT4	1:06.162	Theo Jernberg	Porsche 718 Cayman GT4 RS Clubsport	2024 2nd Karlskoga Porsche Sprint Challenge Scandinavia round
TCR Touring Car	1:06.781	Robert Huff	Volkswagen Golf GTI TCR	2020 Karlskoga TCR STCC round
Supersport 300	1:11.379	Ty Henriksen	Kawasaki Ninja 400	2023 1st Karlskoga Pro Superbike SSP 300 round
NXT Gen Cup	1:17.433	Linus Granfors	LRT NXT1	2023 Karlskoga NXT Gen Cup round
Full Circuit (2006–2016): 2.400 km (1.491 mi)
Formula Renault 2.0	1:01.841	Daniel Roos	Tatuus FR2000	2009 1st Karlskoga Formula Renault 2.0 Sweden round
Silhouette racing car	1:04.488	Fredrik Ekblom	Volvo S60 TTA	2012 1st Karlskoga TTA round
Porsche Carrera Cup	1:04.809	Robin Hansson	Porsche 911 (991 I) GT3 Cup	2015 Karlskoga Porsche Carrera Cup Scandinavia round
Super 2000	1:06.797	Fredrik Ekblom	BMW 320si	2008 Karlskoga STCC round
Full Circuit (1992–2005): 2.530 km (1.572 mi)
Formula Renault 2.0	1:03.634	Frank Kechele	Tatuus FR2000	2004 Karlskoga Formula Renault 2000 Scandinavia round
GT1 (GTS)	1:06.064	Thed Björk	Chrysler Viper GTS-R	2003 Gelleråsen Swedish GTR round
Super Touring	1:06.586	Carl Rosenblad	Nissan Primera GT	2001 1st Karlskoga STCC round
N-GT	1:07.285	Thed Björk	Porsche 911 (996) GT3-R	2001 Gelleråsen Swedish GTR round
Porsche Carrera Cup	1:07.353	Fredrik Ros	Porsche 911 (996) GT3 Cup	2005 Karlskoga Porsche Carrera Cup Scandinavia round
Super 2000	1:09.606	Richard Göransson	BMW 320i	2004 1st Karlskoga STCC round
Full Circuit (1958–1991): 3.000 km (1.864 mi)
Formula Two	1:12.100	Patrick Depailler	March 742	1974 Karlskoga F2 round
Group 7	1:16.200	Chris Craft	McLaren M8C	1970 Kanonloppet
Group 5	1:17.400	Brian Redman	Lola T70	1969 Kanonloppet
Formula Three	1:20.800	Tim Schenken	Brabham BT28	1969 Kanonloppet
500cc	1:21.310	Wil Hartog	Suzuki RG 500	1979 Swedish motorcycle Grand Prix
350cc	1:22.216	Gregg Hansford	Kawasaki KR350	1978 Swedish motorcycle Grand Prix
250cc	1:23.500	Gregg Hansford	Kawasaki KR250	1979 Swedish motorcycle Grand Prix
Formula One	1:24.100	Innes Ireland	Lotus 24	1962 Kanonloppet
125cc	1:28.767	Ángel Nieto	Minarelli	1978 Swedish motorcycle Grand Prix
Group 2	1:38.300	Jackie Stewart (Note: Both drivers took the same lap time in the same race independently.); Bo Ljungfeldt	Ford Lotus Cortina; Ford Mustang	1965 Karlskoga ETCC round
