= 1998 Swedish Touring Car Championship =

Seasons
- ← 1997 1999 →

The 1998 Swedish Touring Car Championship season was the 3rd Swedish Touring Car Championship (STCC) season. It was decided over six race weekends (comprising twelve races) at five different circuits.

Fredrik Ekblom won his first championship for the BMW Dealer Team.

== Entry list ==
Team	Car	No.	Drivers	Class	Rounds
Flash Engineering	Volvo S40	1	(Sweden) Jan Nilsson	D	All
Flash Engineering	Volvo S40	12	(Sweden) Jens Edman	D	3–6
Flash Engineering	Volvo 850 GLT	15	(Sweden) Patrick Ernstson	D	6
Troberg-Rydell Junior Team	Ford Mondeo Ghia	2	(Sweden) Mattias Ekström	D	All
Opel Motorsport	Opel Vectra 16v	3	(Sweden) Thomas Johansson	D	All
Opel Motorsport	Opel Vectra 16v	6	(Sweden) Jan Brunstedt	D	All
Opel Motorsport	Opel Vectra 16v	37	(Sweden) Pontus Mörth	S	All
BMW Dealer Team	BMW 320i	4	(Sweden) Peggen Andersson	D	All
BMW Dealer Team	BMW 320i	11	(Sweden) Fredrik Ekblom	D	All
Mobil Ford Motorsport	Ford Mondeo Ghia	5	(Sweden) Stig Blomqvist	D	All
Mobil Ford Motorsport	Ford Mondeo Ghia	38	(Sweden) Anders Söderberg	D	1–5
Elgh Motorsport	Nissan Primera GT	13	(Sweden) Carl Rosenblad	D	All
Team 13	Honda Accord	16	(Sweden) Stefan Lindberg	D	All
Euroracing AB	Nissan Primera eGT	20	(Finland) Kari Makinen	S	All
Bakajev Motorsport	BMW 318is	21	(Sweden) Georg Bakajev	S	All
Ikegami Motorsport	BMW 318is	22	(Sweden) Niklas Danielsson	S	1–4
Lennart Lindqvist Racing	BMW 318is	23	(Sweden) Lennart Lindqvist	S	All
Kristoffersson Motorsport	Audi A4 Quattro	25	(Sweden) Tommy Kristoffersson	D	All
Kristoffersson Motorsport	Audi A4 Quattro	26	(Sweden) Mats Lindén	D	All
Blue Jeans Powerdrink	Ford Mondeo Ghia	27	(Sweden) Richard Göransson	S	1–3
Ross Racing	Ford Mondeo Ghia	28	(Sweden) Nettan Lindgren-Jansson	S	1–4, 6
Nordic Miltronic Motorsport	Opel Vectra GT	29	(Sweden) Rolf Uhr	S	All
Anders Svensson	BMW 318is	30	(Sweden) Anders Svensson	S	All
Polaris Auto	BMW 318is	31	(Estonia) Tönu Soomer	S	All
Polaris Auto	BMW 318is	32	(Estonia) Anders Bergman	S	All
Kim Esbjug	BMW 318is	33	(Norway) Kim Esbjug	S	All
Östfold Fina Olje	BMW 318is	34	(Norway) Simen Tvete	D	4
Tord Linnerud	Opel Vectra GT	37	(Norway) Tord Linnerud	S	1, 6

Icon	Class
D	Drivers' Championship
S	Synsam Cup

== Race calendar and winners ==
All rounds were held in Sweden.

Round		Circuit	Date	Pole Position	Fastest lap	Winning driver	Winning team	Winning Privateer
1	R1	Mantorp Park	10 May	(Sweden) Mattias Ekström	(Sweden) Fredrik Ekblom	(Sweden) Mats Lindén	Kristoffersson Motorsport	(Sweden) Richard Göransson
1	R2	Mantorp Park	10 May		(Sweden) Peggen Andersson	(Sweden) Fredrik Ekblom	BMW Dealer Team	(Sweden) Pontus Mörth
2	R3	Karlskoga-Gelleråsen	31 May	(Sweden) Jan Nilsson	(Sweden) Jan Nilsson	(Sweden) Jan Nilsson	Flash Engineering	(Sweden) Pontus Mörth
2	R4	Karlskoga-Gelleråsen	31 May		(Sweden) Fredrik Ekblom	(Sweden) Peggen Andersson	BMW Dealer Team	(Sweden) Pontus Mörth
3	R5	Anderstorp	28 June	(Sweden) Mattias Ekström	(Sweden) Fredrik Ekblom	(Sweden) Jan Nilsson	Flash Engineering	(Sweden) Pontus Mörth
3	R6	Anderstorp	28 June		(Sweden) Peggen Andersson	(Sweden) Peggen Andersson	BMW Dealer Team	(Sweden) Georg Bakajev
4	R7	Falkenberg	9 July	(Sweden) Jens Edman	(Sweden) Jens Edman	(Sweden) Jan Nilsson	Flash Engineering	(Sweden) Pontus Mörth
4	R8	Falkenberg	9 July		(Sweden) Mattias Ekström	(Sweden) Jens Edman	Flash Engineering	(Sweden) Pontus Mörth
5	R9	Ring Knutstorp	6 September	(Sweden) Fredrik Ekblom	(Sweden) Fredrik Ekblom	(Sweden) Fredrik Ekblom	BMW Dealer Team	(Sweden) Pontus Mörth
5	R10	Ring Knutstorp	6 September		(Sweden) Mats Lindén	(Sweden) Jan Nilsson	Flash Engineering	(Sweden) Georg Bakajev
6	R11	Mantorp Park	27 September	(Sweden) Tommy Kristoffersson	(Sweden) Fredrik Ekblom	(Sweden) Fredrik Ekblom	BMW Dealer Team	(Sweden) Pontus Mörth
6	R12	Mantorp Park	27 September		(Sweden) Peggen Andersson	(Sweden) Jan Nilsson	Flash Engineering	(Sweden) Pontus Mörth

== Championship standings ==
=== Drivers' Championship ===
Points were awarded to the top ten drivers in a race as follows: 20, 15, 12, 10, 8, 6, 4, 3, 2, 1.
5 points were awarded to any driver who took part in qualifying.
Top 6 finishers in Race 1 were reversed to decide the Race 2 grid.
The final meeting of the year saw double points awarded.

Pos.	Driver	MAN		KAR		AND		FAL		KNU		MAN		Pts
1	(Sweden) Fredrik Ekblom	4	1	2	2	3	4	Ret	2	**1**	3	1	2	229
2	(Sweden) Jan Nilsson	Ret	Ret	**1**	4	1	2	1	Ret	5	1	3	1	207
3	(Sweden) Peggen Andersson	Ret	4	4	1	Ret	1	Ret	Ret	2	5	4	9	137
4	(Sweden) Tommy Kristoffersson	5	3	6	**10**	7	6	10	11	Ret	6	**2**	3	128
5	(Sweden) Mats Lindén	1	2	7	3	4	10	Ret	5	3	8	13	Ret	115
6	(Sweden) Jan Brunstedt	2	6	8	6	Ret	Ret	3	4	7	16	6	**5**	114
7	(Sweden) Pontus Mörth	9	7	5	5	6	**11**	4	3	9	17	7	7	98
8	(Sweden) Mattias Ekström	**Ret**	8	3	Ret	**2**	3	Ret	Ret	4	2	Ret	DNS	97
9	(Sweden) Jens Edman					Ret	7	**2**	1	6	**7**	5	Ret	85
10	(Sweden) Carl Rosenblad	3	5	11	9	Ret	5	5	Ret	Ret	Ret	Ret	6	80
11	(Sweden) Stefan Lindberg	Ret	Ret	18	11	12	19	8	Ret	10	Ret	8	4	60
12	(Sweden) Thomas Johansson	Ret	Ret	Ret	7	5	Ret	Ret	Ret	8	4	DNS	DNS	55
13	(Sweden) Stig Blomqvist	Ret	DNS	10	8	8	Ret	DNS	7	Ret	Ret	9	8	51
14	(Finland) Kari Mäkinen	7	9	12	DNS	13	9	6	**6**	17	Ret	Ret	Ret	50
15	(Sweden) Georg Bakajev	8	10	Ret	15	17	8	7	Ret	16	9	10	10	47
16	(Estonia) Tönu Soomer	11	13	17	Ret	11	21	12	8	Ret	11	Ret	Ret	33
17	(Sweden) Rolf Uhr	15	15	16	17	14	16	11	9	14	10	12	11	33
18	(Sweden) Anders Svensson	13	11	13	DNS	Ret	13	Ret	10	12	14	15	12	31
19	(Norway) Kim Esbjug	12	Ret	Ret	13	DNS	15	15	Ret	11	13	17	14	30
20	(Estonia) Anders Bergman	14	14	14	16	Ret	20	14	14	18	Ret	18	15	30
21	(Sweden) Lennart Lindqvist	Ret	DNS	15	DNS	16	18	13	13	15	15	16	13	30
22	(Sweden) Niklas Danielsson	10	Ret	9	Ret	9	12	9	Ret					27
23	(Sweden) Anders Söderberg	Ret	Ret	Ret	14	10	14	Ret	12	13	12			26
24	(Sweden) Nettan Lindgren-Jansson	Ret	12	Ret	12	15	17	DNS	DNS			14	Ret	25
25	(Sweden) Richard Göransson	6	**16**	Ret	Ret	DNS	DNS							21
26	(Norway) Tord Linnerud	DNS	DNS									11	Ret	5
27	(Norway) Simen Tvete							Ret	Ret					5
28	(Sweden) Patrick Ernstson											Ret	DNS	5
Pos.	Driver	MAN		KAR		AND		FAL		KNU		MAN		Pts

Colour	Result
Gold	Winner
Silver	Second place
Bronze	Third place
Green	Points classification
Blue	Non-points classification
Blue	Non-classified finish (NC)
Purple	Retired, not classified (Ret)
Red	Did not qualify (DNQ)
Red	Did not pre-qualify (DNPQ)
Black	Disqualified (DSQ)
White	Did not start (DNS)
White	Withdrew (WD)
White	Race cancelled (C)
Blank	Did not practice (DNP)
Blank	Did not arrive (DNA)
Blank	Excluded (EX)

**Bold** – Pole
Italics – Fastest Lap

=== Synsam Cup for Privateers ===
Pos.	Driver	MAN		KAR		AND		FAL		KNU		MAN		Pts
1	(Sweden) Pontus Mörth	9	7	5	5	6	11	4	3	9	17	7	7	247
2	(Sweden) Georg Bakajev	8	10	Ret	15	17	8	7	Ret	16	9	10	10	157
3	(Sweden) Rolf Uhr	15	15	16	17	14	16	11	9	14	10	12	11	110
4	(Sweden) Anders Svensson	13	11	13	DNS	Ret	13	Ret	10	12	14	15	12	92
5	(Finland) Kari Mäkinen	7	9	12	DNS	13	9	6	6	17	Ret	Ret	Ret	71
6	(Norway) Kim Esbjug	12	Ret	Ret	13	DNS	15	15	Ret	11	13	17	14	67
7	(Sweden) Niklas Danielsson	10	Ret	9	Ret	9	12	9	Ret					63
8	(Estonia) Tönu Soomer	11	13	17	Ret	11	21	12	8	Ret	11	Ret	Ret	61
9	(Sweden) Anders Söderberg	Ret	Ret	Ret	14	10	14	Ret	12	13	12			58
10	(Sweden) Nettan Lindgren-Jansson	Ret	12	Ret	12	15	17	DNS	DNS			14	Ret	57
11	(Sweden) Lennart Lindqvist	Ret	DNS	15	DNS	16	18	13	13	15	15	16	13	52
12	(Estonia) Anders Bergman	14	14	14	16	Ret	20	14	14	18	Ret	18	15	46
13	(Norway) Tord Linnerud											11	Ret	28
14	(Sweden) Richard Göransson	6	16	Ret	Ret	DNS	DNS							25
Pos.	Driver	MAN		KAR		AND		FAL		KNU		MAN		Pts

Colour	Result
Gold	Winner
Silver	Second place
Bronze	Third place
Green	Points classification
Blue	Non-points classification
Blue	Non-classified finish (NC)
Purple	Retired, not classified (Ret)
Red	Did not qualify (DNQ)
Red	Did not pre-qualify (DNPQ)
Black	Disqualified (DSQ)
White	Did not start (DNS)
White	Withdrew (WD)
White	Race cancelled (C)
Blank	Did not practice (DNP)
Blank	Did not arrive (DNA)
Blank	Excluded (EX)
