= 1996 Swedish Touring Car Championship =

Seasons
- ← none 1997 →

The 1996 Swedish Touring Car Championship season was the inaugural season of the championship. It was decided in twelve races over five race weekends held at five different circuits.

Jan Nilsson was the first championship winner of the STCC.

== Teams and drivers ==
| Team | Car | No. | Drivers | Rounds |
|---|---|---|---|---|
| Team Valvoline | Mercedes 190E | 4 | (Sweden) Mikael Dahlgren | All |
| Marksam Racing AB | Mercedes 190E | 6 | (Sweden) Jonas Lundberg | 1-4 |
| Tomas Nyström | BMW M3 | 7 | (Sweden) Tomas Nyström | 1-3 |
| Bridgestone Sweden | Volvo 900 | 8 | (Sweden) Ulf Palm | 1-3, 5 |
| Anders Svensson | BMW M3 | 9 | (Sweden) Anders Svensson | 1-2, 5 |
| Håkan Malmborg | Ford Sierra | 10 | (Sweden) Håkan Malmborg | 2, 5 |
| Etab Data AB | BMW M3 | 21 | (Sweden) Torbjörn Holmstedt | 3 |
| Bohlin Racing | Vauxhall Cavalier GSi | 25 | (United Kingdom) Nigel Smith | 1-2 |
| Lejtorp Racing | Mercedes 190E | 26 | (Sweden) Eric Persson | All |
| Bengt Winberg | Mercedes 190E | 32 | (Sweden) Bengt Winberg | 3 |
| Bakajev Motorsport | BMW 318is | 55 | (Sweden) Georg Bakajev | All |
| Anders Larsson | Renault Laguna | 71 | (Sweden) Anders Larsson | 2-3, 5 |
| Matador Racing | BMW M3 | 72 | (Sweden) Hasse Berglund | All |
| Thomas Hall | BMW M3 | 74 | (Sweden) Thomas Hall | 3 |
| Sällfors Racing | Ford Sierra | 75 | (Sweden) Andreas Boström | 3-4 |
| Sällfors Racing | BMW 318is | 76 | (Sweden) Torbjörn Sällfors | 4 |
| BMW Junior Team | BMW 318is | 77 | (Sweden) Thomas Johansson | All |
| Flash Engineering | Volvo 850 GLT | 79 | (Sweden) Jan Nilsson | All |
| Flash Engineering | Ford Mondeo Ghia | 82 | (Sweden) Elisabeth Nilsson | All |
| Jan Brunstedt Motorsport | Opel Vectra GT | 81 | (Sweden) Jan Brunstedt | All |

== Race calendar and winners ==
All rounds were held in Sweden.

| Round | | Circuit | Date | Pole position | Fastest lap | Winning driver | Winning team |
|---|---|---|---|---|---|---|---|
| 1 | R1 | Mantorp Park | 12 May | (Sweden) Jan Nilsson | (Sweden) Jan Nilsson | (Sweden) Jan Nilsson | Flash Engineering |
| 1 | R2 | Mantorp Park | 12 May | | (United Kingdom) Nigel Smith | (Sweden) Jan Nilsson | Flash Engineering |
| 2 | R3 | Karlskoga-Gelleråsen | 9 June | (Sweden) Jan Nilsson | (Sweden) Jan Nilsson | (Sweden) Jan Nilsson | Flash Engineering |
| 3 | R4 | Falkenberg | 7 July | (Sweden) Jan Nilsson | (Sweden) Jan Nilsson | (Sweden) Jan Nilsson | Flash Engineering |
| 3 | R5 | Falkenberg | 7 July | | (Sweden) Jan Nilsson | (Sweden) Thomas Johansson | BMW Junior Team |
| 4 | R6 | Ring Knutstorp | 4 August | (Sweden) Jan Nilsson | (Sweden) Jan Nilsson | (Sweden) Jan Nilsson | Flash Engineering |
| 4 | R7 | Ring Knutstorp | 4 August | | (Sweden) Eric Persson | (Sweden) Mikael Dahlgren | Team Valvoline |
| 5 | R8 | Kinnekulle | 27 September | (Sweden) Jan Nilsson | (Sweden) Eric Persson | (Sweden) Hasse Berglund | Matador Racing |
| 5 | R9 | Kinnekulle | 27 September | | (Sweden) Jan Nilsson | (Sweden) Jan Nilsson | Flash Engineering |

== Championship standings ==
Points system
| 1st | 2nd | 3rd | 4th | 5th | 6th | 7th | 8th | 9th | 10th |
| 20 | 15 | 12 | 10 | 8 | 6 | 4 | 3 | 2 | 1 |

- 5 points were awarded to any driver who took part in qualifying.
- Results in Race 1 decide the Race 2 grid.
- 7 results from 9 are valid for the championship
- Double Points in the final meeting.

== Drivers championship ==
| Pos. | Driver | MAN | | KAR | FAL | | KNU | | KIN | | Pts |
|---|---|---|---|---|---|---|---|---|---|---|---|
| 1 | (Sweden) Jan Nilsson | **1** | **1** | **1** | **1** | **(9)** | **1** | **(5)** | **9** | 1 | **169** (179) |
| 2 | (Sweden) Thomas Johansson | Ret | 3 | (4) | 3 | 1 | 2 | 2 | 4 | 3 | **143** (153) |
| 3 | (Sweden) Mikael Dahlgren | 5 | (6) | Ret | 5 | 2 | 3 | 1 | 3 | 4 | **132** (138) |
| 4 | (Sweden) Jan Brunstedt | 3 | 4 | 6 | 2 | Ret | Ret | 3 | 6 | 2 | **122** |
| 5 | (Sweden) Eric Persson | 4 | (8) | 3 | 7 | 3 | 4 | Ret | 2 | Ret | **103** (106) |
| 6 | (Sweden) Hasse Berglund | Ret | DNS | DSQ | Ret | 8 | Ret | DNS | 1 | **5** | **84** |
| 7 | (Sweden) Georg Bakajev | Ret | 9 | 8 | 4 | 4 | DSQ | DSQ | 5 | 6 | **73** |
| 8 | (Sweden) Elisabeth Nilsson | Ret | 5 | 2 | Ret | 7 | Ret | 4 | Ret | 7 | **70** |
| 9 | (Sweden) Thomas Nyström | 7 | 10 | 5 | 8 | 6 | | | | | **37** |
| 10 | (Sweden) Jonas Lundberg | 6 | 7 | 7 | 9 | Ret | Ret | DNS | | | **36** |
| 11 | (United Kingdom) Nigel Smith | 2 | 2 | DNS | | | | | | | **35** |
| 12 | (Sweden) Ulf Palm | 8 | 12 | 9 | Ret | Ret | | | 10 | 9 | **27** |
| 13 | (Sweden) Anders Svensson | Ret | 11 | Ret | | | | | 7 | Ret | **23** |
| 14 | (Sweden) Håken Malmborg | | | Ret | | | | | 8 | 8 | **22** |
| 15 | (Sweden) Bengt Winqvist | | | | 6 | 5 | | | | | **19** |
| 16 | (Sweden) Torbjörn Sällfors | | | | | | 5 | 6 | | | **19** |
| 17 | (Sweden) Anders Larsson | | | DNS | Ret | Ret | | | Ret | DNS | **15** |
| 18 | (Sweden) Andreas Boström | | | | DNS | Ret | Ret | Ret | | | **10** |
| 19 | (Sweden) Thomas Hall | | | | Ret | 10 | | | | | **6** |
| 20 | (Sweden) Torbjörn Holmstedt | | | | Ret | 11 | | | | | **5** |
| Pos. | Driver | MAN | | KAR | FAL | | KNU | | KIN | | Pts |

| Colour | Result |
|---|---|
| Gold | Winner |
| Silver | Second place |
| Bronze | Third place |
| Green | Points classification |
| Blue | Non-points classification |
| Blue | Non-classified finish (NC) |
| Purple | Retired, not classified (Ret) |
| Red | Did not qualify (DNQ) |
| Red | Did not pre-qualify (DNPQ) |
| Black | Disqualified (DSQ) |
| White | Did not start (DNS) |
| White | Withdrew (WD) |
| White | Race cancelled (C) |
| Blank | Did not practice (DNP) |
| Blank | Did not arrive (DNA) |
| Blank | Excluded (EX) |

**Bold** – Pole
Italics – Fastest Lap
