= 1997 Swedish Touring Car Championship =

Seasons
- ← 1996 1998 →

The 1997 Swedish Touring Car Championship season was the 2nd season of the championship. It was decided over six race weekends (comprising twelve races) at six different circuits.

Jan Nilsson won the second championship of the STCC.

It was two-time DTM champion Mattias Ekström's touring car debut year driving a black Volvo 850 GLT.

== Teams and drivers ==
| Team | Car | No. | Drivers | Rounds |
|---|---|---|---|---|
| Flash Engineering | Volvo 850 GLT | 1 | (Sweden) Jan Nilsson | All |
| Flash Engineering | Ford Mondeo Ghia | 8 | (Sweden) Elisabeth Nilsson | 1-3, 5-6 |
| Flash Engineering | Ford Mondeo Ghia | 18 | (Sweden) Fredrik Larsson | 5 |
| BMW Mobil 1 Dealer Team | BMW 320i | 2 | (Sweden) Thomas Johansson | All |
| Troberg - Rydell Junior Team | Volvo 850 GLT | 3 | (Sweden) Mattias Ekström | All |
| Opel Super Touring Team Sweden | Opel Vectra 16v | 4 | (Sweden) Jan Brunstedt | All |
| Opel Super Touring Team Sweden | Opel Vectra GT | 9 | (Sweden) Kari Mäkinen | All |
| Team Becker Schauman Wood | BMW 318is | 5 | (Sweden) Peggen Andersson | All |
| Mobil Ford Motorsport | Ford Mondeo Ghia | 6 | (Sweden) Stig Blomqvist | All |
| Mobil Ford Motorsport | Ford Mondeo Ghia | 7 | (Sweden) Anders Söderberg | All |
| Stenlund Motorsport | Alfa Romeo 155 TS | 10 | (Sweden) Ulrik Gustavsson | All |
| Ikegami Motorsport | BMW M3 | 15 | (Sweden) Niklas Danielsson | 1-4, 6 |
| Thenander Motorsport | Volvo 850 GLT | 16 | (Sweden) Bengt Thenander | 2 |
| Team Bilbolaget | Renault Laguna | 17 | (Sweden) Anders Larsson | 4 |
| Lennart Lindqvist Racing | Ford Sierra | 20 | (Sweden) Lennart Lindqvist | All |
| Bòrje Gustavsson | BMW M3 | 22 | (Sweden) Bòrje Gustavsson | 1-2, 4-6 |
| Bakajev Motorsport | BMW 318is | 55 | (Sweden) Georg Bakajev | 1-2, 4-5 |
| Tryggve Enger | BMW 318is | 56 | (Norway) Tryggve Enger | 1, 4 |
| Brosson Racing | Volvo 850 GLT | 99 | (Sweden) Jens Edman | 6 |

== Race calendar and winners ==
All rounds were held in Sweden.

| Round | | Circuit | Date | Pole position | Fastest lap | Winning driver | Winning team |
|---|---|---|---|---|---|---|---|
| 1 | R1 | Mantorp Park | 5 May | (Sweden) Thomas Johansson | (Sweden) Jan Nilsson | (Sweden) Mattias Ekström | Troberg - Rydell Junior Team |
| 1 | R2 | Mantorp Park | 5 May | | (Sweden) Mattias Ekström | (Sweden) Mattias Ekström | Troberg - Rydell Junior Team |
| 2 | R3 | Kinnekulle | 25 May | (Sweden) Jan Nilsson | (Sweden) Jan Nilsson | (Sweden) Jan Nilsson | Flash Engineering |
| 2 | R4 | Kinnekulle | 25 May | | (Sweden) Mattias Ekström | (Sweden) Jan Nilsson | Flash Engineering |
| 3 | R5 | Anderstorp | 8 June | (Sweden) Jan Nilsson | (Sweden) Mattias Ekström | (Sweden) Mattias Ekström | Troberg - Rydell Junior Team |
| 3 | R6 | Anderstorp | 8 June | | (Sweden) Thomas Johansson | (Sweden) Jan Nilsson | Flash Engineering |
| 4 | R7 | Falkenberg | 13 July | (Sweden) Mattias Ekström | (Sweden) Jan Nilsson | (Sweden) Jan Nilsson | Flash Engineering |
| 4 | R8 | Falkenberg | 13 July | | (Sweden) Jan Brunstedt | (Sweden) Jan Nilsson | Flash Engineering |
| 5 | R9 | Ring Knutstorp | 3 August | (Sweden) Jan Nilsson | (Sweden) Jan Nilsson | (Sweden) Jan Nilsson | Flash Engineering |
| 5 | R10 | Ring Knutstorp | 3 August | | (Sweden) Mattias Ekström | (Sweden) Jan Nilsson | Flash Engineering |
| 6 | R11 | Karlskoga-Gelleråsen | 31 August | (Sweden) Jan Nilsson | (Sweden) Jan Nilsson | (Sweden) Jan Nilsson | Flash Engineering |
| 6 | R12 | Karlskoga-Gelleråsen | 31 August | | (Sweden) Thomas Johansson | (Sweden) Mattias Ekström | Troberg - Rydell Junior Team |

== Drivers championship ==
Points were awarded to the top ten drivers in a race as follows: 20, 15, 12, 10, 8, 6, 4, 3, 2, 1.
5 points were awarded to any driver who took part in qualifying.
Classified finishers in Race 1 were reversed to decide the Race 2 grid.
The final meeting of the year saw double points awarded.

| Pos. | Driver | MAN | | KIN | | AND | | FAL | | KNU | | KAR | | Pts |
|---|---|---|---|---|---|---|---|---|---|---|---|---|---|---|
| 1 | (Sweden) Jan Nilsson | Ret | DNS | **1** | 1 | **2** | 1 | 1 | 1 | **1** | 1 | **1** | 3 | 249 |
| 2 | (Sweden) Mattias Ekström | 1 | 1 | Ret | 4 | 1 | 4 | **2** | Ret | Ret | 2 | 6 | 1 | 192 |
| 3 | (Sweden) Thomas Johansson | **Ret** | DNS | 2 | 2 | 3 | 2 | DSQ | 3 | DNS | DNS | 2 | 2 | 159 |
| 4 | (Sweden) Peggen Andersson | 9 | **Ret** | 3 | 3 | 4 | 3 | 6 | 2 | 2 | 10 | 4 | 5 | 151 |
| 5 | (Sweden) Stig Blomqvist | 3 | Ret | 4 | Ret | 5 | 7 | 3 | 4 | 3 | 3 | 3 | 6 | 146 |
| 6 | (Sweden) Kari Mäkinen | 4 | 2 | Ret | 6 | Ret | 6 | 7 | 6 | 7 | 4 | 7 | 8 | 105 |
| 7 | (Sweden) Jan Brunstedt | 2 | Ret | 7 | Ret | 8 | 5 | DSQ | 5 | 4 | 6 | Ret | 4 | 104 |
| 8 | (Sweden) Anders Söderberg | 5 | DNS | 6 | 7 | 7 | Ret | 4 | Ret | Ret | 7 | 5 | 9 | 86 |
| 9 | (Sweden) Ulrik Gustavsson | Ret | Ret | 5 | 5 | 6 | Ret | 5 | 7 | 5 | 5 | 9 | Ret | 84 |
| 10 | (Sweden) Georg Bakajev | 8 | 3 | 10 | **Ret** | | | 8 | Ret | 6 | Ret | | | 45 |
| 11 | (Sweden) Niklas Danielsson | Ret | 5 | 9 | 8 | 10 | **10** | Ret | 10 | | | 10 | **DNS** | 43 |
| 12 | (Sweden) Börje Gustavsson | 7 | Ret | 8 | 10 | | | 9 | Ret | 10 | **9** | NC | 10 | 40 |
| 13 | (Sweden) Lennart Lindqvist | Ret | DNS | Ret | DNS | Ret | 9 | 10 | **9** | 9 | 8 | NC | DNS | 40 |
| 14 | (Sweden) Elisabeth Nilsson | Ret | 4 | Ret | DNS | 9 | 8 | | | DNS | DNS | Ret | DNS | 40 |
| 15 | (Sweden) Jens Edman | | | | | | | | | | | 8 | 7 | 19 |
| 16 | (Norway) Tryggve Enger | 6 | Ret | | | | | Ret | 8 | | | | | 19 |
| 17 | (Sweden) Fredrik Larsson | | | | | | | | | 8 | Ret | | | 8 |
| 18 | (Sweden) Bengt Thenander | | | Ret | 9 | | | | | | | | | 7 |
| 19 | (Sweden) Anders Larsson | | | | | | | Ret | DNS | | | | | 5 |
| Pos. | Driver | MAN | | KIN | | AND | | FAL | | KNU | | KAR | | Pts |

| Colour | Result |
|---|---|
| Gold | Winner |
| Silver | Second place |
| Bronze | Third place |
| Green | Points classification |
| Blue | Non-points classification |
| Blue | Non-classified finish (NC) |
| Purple | Retired, not classified (Ret) |
| Red | Did not qualify (DNQ) |
| Red | Did not pre-qualify (DNPQ) |
| Black | Disqualified (DSQ) |
| White | Did not start (DNS) |
| White | Withdrew (WD) |
| White | Race cancelled (C) |
| Blank | Did not practice (DNP) |
| Blank | Did not arrive (DNA) |
| Blank | Excluded (EX) |

**Bold** – Pole
Italics – Fastest Lap
