= Jan Brunstedt =

Swedish racing driver (born 1949)

Jan Olof Brunstedt (born 9 July 1949 in Stockholm, Sweden) is an auto racing driver who competed in the 2008 Porsche Carrera Cup Scandinavia at the age of 59. He is also an airline pilot and managing director of Nordic Aero.

Brunstedt started racing in karting from 1979. From then, he drove in single-seaters including the Swedish Formula 3 and Swedish Formula Opel championships. In 1996, he finished second in points driving in the Swedish Touring Car Championship. In 1997, he raced an ex-RML Vauxhall Vectra as an independent entry, making the briefest of appearances in the British Touring Car Championship. He only managed to race in two rounds at the second meeting of the year at Silverstone, finishing last in both races.

Brunstedt once competed in the STCC in 2003 for Bakajev Motorsport in a BMW 320i.

== Racing record ==
=== Partial Swedish Touring Car Championship results ===
(key) (Races in bold indicate pole position) (Races in italics indicate fastest lap)

Year	Team	Car	1	2	3	4	5	6	7	8	9	10	11	12	13	14	15	16	Pos	Pts
1996	Jan Brunstedt Motorsport	Opel Vectra GT	MAN; 1; 3	MAN; 2; 4	KAR; 6	FAL; 1; 2	FAL; 2 Ret	KNU; 1 Ret	KNU; 2; 3	KIN; 1; 6	KIN; 2; 2								**4th**	**122**
1997	Opel Super Touring Team Sweden	Opel Vectra 16v	MAN; 1; 2	MAN; 2 Ret	KIN; 1; 7	KIN; 2 Ret	AND; 1; 8	AND; 2; 5	FAL; 1 DSQ	FAL; 2; 5	KNU; 1; 4	KNU; 2; 6	KAR; 1 Ret	KAR; 2; 4					**7th**	**104**
1998	Opel Motorsport	Opel Vectra 16v	MAN; 1; 2	MAN; 2; 6	KAR; 1; 8	KAR; 2; 6	AND; 1 Ret	AND; 2 Ret	FAL; 1; 3	FAL; 2; 4	KNU; 1; 7	KNU; 2; 16	MAN; 1; 6	**MAN**; **2**; 5					**6th**	**114**
1999	Opel Motorsport	Opel Vectra 16v	MAN; 1 Ret	MAN; 2; 15	KNU; 1; 15	KNU; 2; 12	KAR; 1; 9	KAR; 2 Ret	AND; 1; 9	AND; 2; 11	FAL; 1 Ret	FAL; 2; 10	AND; 1 Ret	AND; 2 DNS	ARC; 1; 19	ARC; 2; 16	MAN; 1; 12	MAN; 2; 9	**18th**	**9**

=== Complete British Touring Car Championship results ===
(key) (Races in bold indicate pole position - 1 point awarded all races) (Races in italics indicate fastest lap)

Year	Team	Car	1	2	3	4	5	6	7	8	9	10	11	12	13	14	15	16	17	18	19	20	21	22	23	24	Pos	Pts
1997	Janco Motorsport	Opel Vectra	DON; 1	DON; 2	SIL; 1; 17	SIL; 2; 14	THR; 1	THR; 2	BRH; 1	BRH; 2	OUL; 1	OUL; 2	DON; 1	DON; 2	CRO; 1	CRO; 2	KNO; 1	KNO; 2	SNE; 1	SNE; 2	THR; 1	THR; 2	BRH; 1	BRH; 2	SIL; 1	SIL; 2	**22nd**	**0**
