= Stefan Lindberg =

Swedish writer, playwright and translator

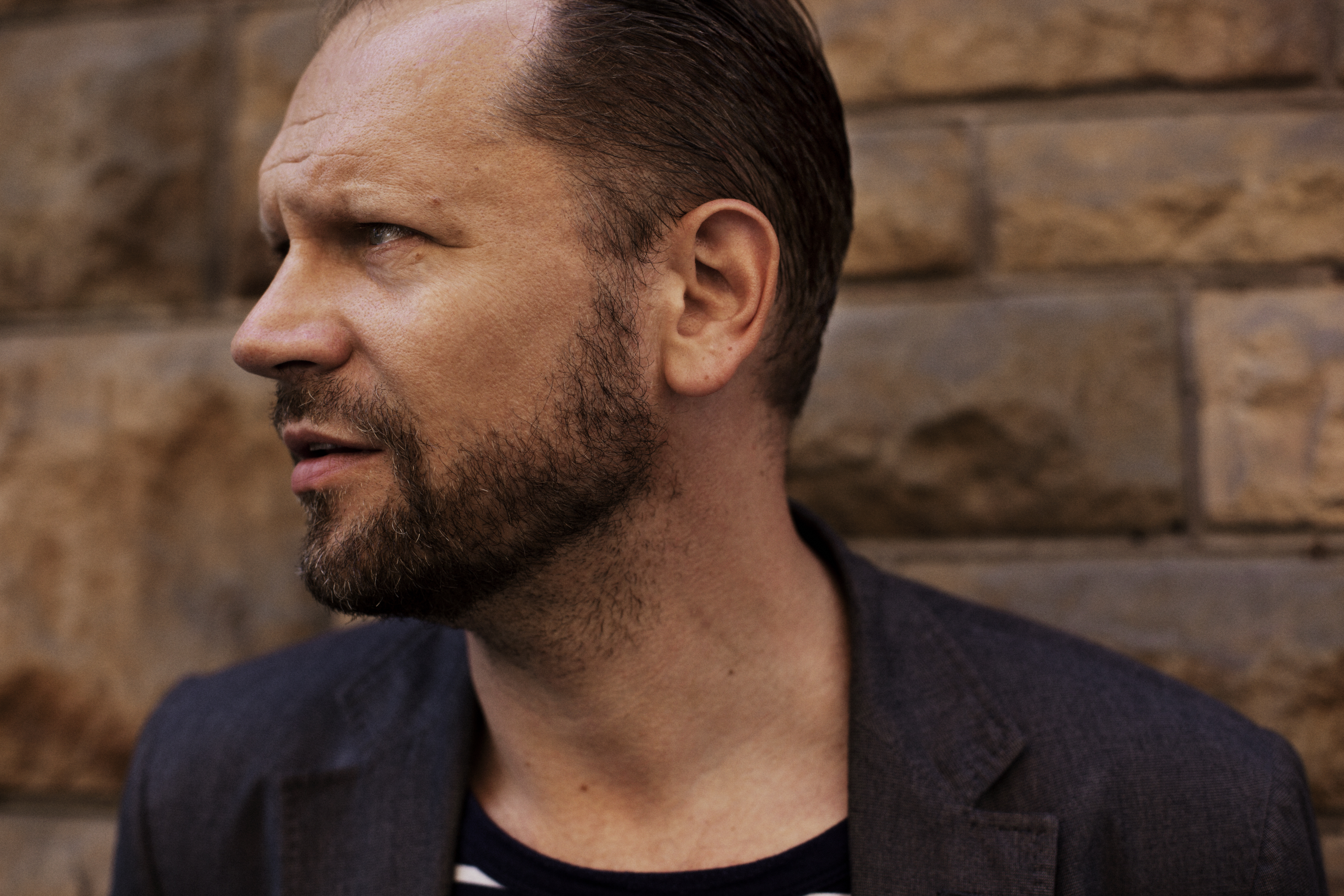
Stefan Lindberg, 2013

Stefan Lindberg (born 1971 in Alingsås) is a Swedish writer, playwright and translator.

He debuted in 1999 with the short story collection Tusen nålar. In 2002, he published the novel Min terapi and in 2008 the collection of short stories I Gorans ögon. In 2014, he published the acclaimed novel Du vet väl om att du är värdefull and 2016 Nätterna på Mon Chéri, också, also a novel, which revolves around the so-called "33-åringen", the Palme murder and its investigation.

His novel Splendor (2020) was nominated for the August Prize in the category of best fiction book. His dramatic works include Palme dör innan paus and Lavv. The latter has been set up several times, both in Sweden and abroad.

== Bibliography ==
- 1999 – Tusen nålar (translated, A thousand needles) - stories, Albert Bonniers Förlag
- 2002 – Min terapi (translated, My therapy) - novel, Albert Bonniers Förlag
- 2008 – I Gorans ögon (translated In Goran's eyes) - stories, Albert Bonniers Förlag
- 2014 – Du vet väl om att du är värdefull (translated, You know very well that you are valuable) - novel Albert Bonniers Förlag)
- 2016 – Nätterna på Mon Chéri (translated, The nights at Mon Chéri) - novel, Albert Bonniers Förlag
- 2020 – Splendor - novel, Albert Bonniers Förlag
- 2024 – Viskarna - novel, Albert Bonniers Förlag

== Awards and nominations ==
- 2014 – Ludvig Nordström Prize
- 2014 – Ole and Ann-Marie Söderström's prize
- 2014 – Nominated for Tidningen Vi's literature prize for Du vet väl om att du är värdefull
- 2016 – Nominated for the Swedish Radio Novel Prize and Tidningen Vi's literature prize for Nätterna på Mon Chéri
- 2020 – nominated for the August Prize and the Swedish Radio Novel Prize for Splendor

== Other prose ==
- 2008 – Slump (collective novel, published by Hotel Gothia Towers)
- 2009 – Stjärnjägarna (short stories)
- 2011 – The Bear Hunter (Tee fruit press)
- 2014 – Till havet (Novellix)

== Plays ==
- 1993 – Trivsel
- 1999 – Hej och välkomna (Östgötateatern)
- 2000 – Världens smartaste tjej (Östgötateatern)
- 2001 – Palme dör innan paus (Teater Bhopa)
- 2001 – Pilot (Ung Scen Öst)
- 2002 – Ja och Nej (Ung Scen Öst)
- 2003 – Lavv (Ung Scen Öst)
- 2004 – Huvudvärk med E (Ung Scen Öst)
- 2005 – Mörkrets furste
- 2007 – Det ryggradslösa djuret (radio play)
- 2008 – Plocka potäter i kostym (Regionteater Väst)
- 2010 – Prick och Fläck (dramatisering av Lotta Geffenblads böcker om Prick och Fläck, Teater 23)
- 2010 – Det som en gång var fet jävla äng (Riksteatern, Länk)
- 2013 – Texter till Gruppen och Herrarna (Gruppen)
- 2013 – Barnen från yttre rymden (Länsteatern Blekinge/Kronoberg)

== Anthologies ==
- 1999 – Författarbesök (Almqvist & Wiksell)
- 2004 – Unga Röster (Studentlitteratur)
- 2006 – Omkopplingar: avskrifter, listor, dokument, arkiv (Glänta)
- 2007 – Spela bollen jag är fri!: trettio europeiska författare om fotboll (Författarlandslagets förlag)
- 2008 – Fem pjäser för unga (Ung Scen Öst)
- 2010 – De Nios litterära kalender (Norstedts)
- 2011 – I den nordiska litteraturens tjänst (Pequod)
- 2012 – Länk (Gidlunds förlag)
- 2012 – MEN – mannens frigörelse från mannen (Weyler förlag)
- 2018 – Svenska noveller från Almqvist till Stoor (Albert Bonniers Förlag)
- 2019 – Tankar för dagen (Verbum)

== Translations ==
- Motortown, Simon Stephens, Östgötateatern, 27 January 2007
- På stranden av världen, Simon Stephens (On the Shore of the Wide World) Simon Stephens, Göteborgs Stadsteater, 7 September 2007
- Examenstal till studenterna vid Kenyon College, 21 May 2005, David Foster Wallace, Glänta nr 4.08
- Harper Regan, Simon Stephens, Stockholms stadsteater 12 December 2009, Göteborgs stadsteater 3 April 2009
- Groupie, Arnold Wesker, Teater Nolby, 10 February 2011
- Kärlek och pengar (Love and Money), Dennis Kelly, 12 November 2010, Malmö Stadsteater
- Sångtexter till Helsingborgs Stadsteaters föreställning ”Allt som är ditt” 25 February 2011
- Jag älskar dig, mannen (I love you, Bro), Adam Cass, Riksteatern, 27 September 2011
- Vintertid, (Winterlong), Andrew Sheridan, Göteborgs Stadsteater, 25 November 2011
- Ett vanligt liv, (Det normale liv), Christian Lollike, Örebro Länsteater
- 1984, av George Orwell i ny dramatisering av Robert Icke och Duncan Macmillan, Riksteatern, 2015
- Goda människor (Good people), David Lindsay-Abaire, Riksteatern, 2016
- Verkligheten (The Events), David Greig, Kulturhuset/Stadsteatern, 2017
- DNA, Dennis Kelly, Riksteatern/LÄNK, 2017
