= Jan "Flash" Nilsson =

Swedish racing driver

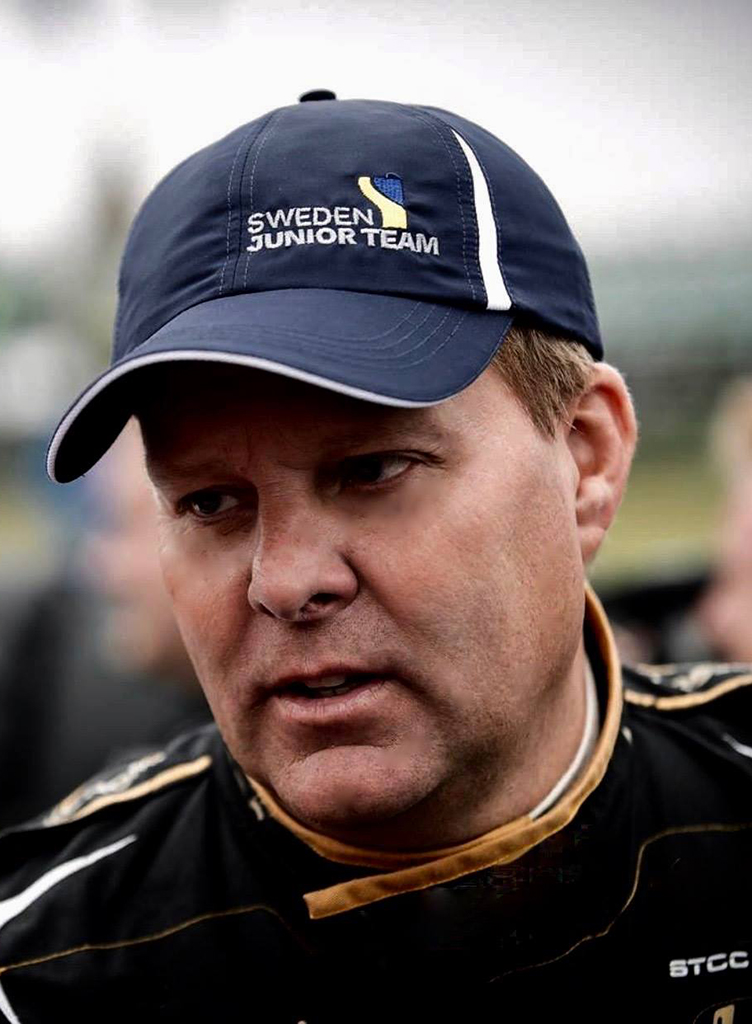
- Jan "Flash" Nilsson
- Nationality: Swedish
- Born: 15 December 1960 (age 65) Karlstad, Sweden

Swedish Touring Car Championship career
- Debut season: 1996
- Car number: 6
- Former teams: Flash Engineering; Jan Nilsson Racing
- Wins: 35
- Best finish: 1st in 1996, 1997

Previous series
- Clio Cup Scandinavia; Renault Spider Cup; Porsche Carrera Cup; Swedish F3

Championship titles
- 1996, 1997 1994 1989: STCC; Clio Cup Scandinavia; Swedish F3

Jan Stefan Sören "Flash" Nilsson (born 15 December 1960) is a Swedish former race car driver. He is most famous for his appearance in the Swedish Touring Car Championship, having driven full season in 15 seasons and for being the third most victorious driver (two championship wins and 35 race wins).

== Early career ==
Jan Nilsson started competing in Formula Ford in 1983 before moving on to Formula 3. He became the Swedish F3 champion in 1989 and drove Formula 3 in Japan and Mexico before moving to Clio Cup Scandinavia. He finished second in 1992 and moved up to Renault Spider Eurocup in 1993 after becoming champion in 1992. His first year in the Spider Eurocup saw him finishing in fourth place, as did the 1995 season. In 1996, he finished third.

== STCC ==
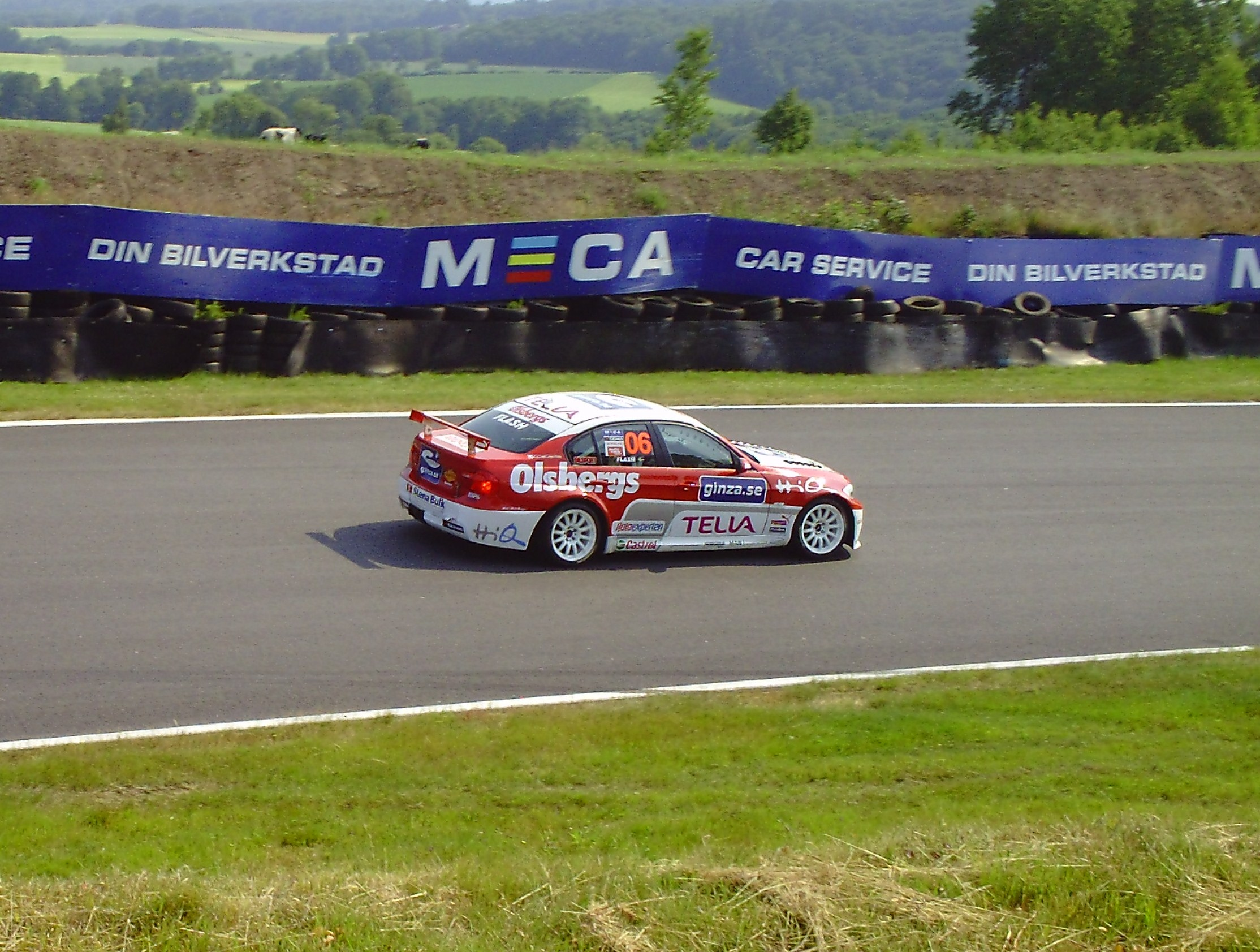
Nilsson driving a BMW 320si at Falkenbergs Motorbana.

Nilsson's own team, Flash Engineering, became the official Volvo team. He took the title in 1996 and 1997, both in a Volvo 850. and was second in 1998, this time in a Volvo S40. In 1999, he was fifth, and sixth in 2000. Nilsson finished second overall in the 2001, 2002 and 2003 seasons.

After a somewhat tough 2004 season (only one race win during the whole season), Nilsson sold Flash Engineering. The team changed its name to Polestar Racing. Nilsson started a new, smaller team for the 2005 season, also called Flash Engineering. The team ran one BMW 320i E46 for Nilsson, finishing ninth overall in STCC 2005.

Flash Engineering signed on several new sponsors, the Swedish mailservice "Posten" among others, for 2006 and dramatically increased their available funds. They also signed on double Swedish champion Richard Göransson and former Flash Engineering Volvo driver Edward Sandström. Göransson and Nilsson drove new BMW 320si E90 cars for the 2006 season, while Sandström drove the older BMW 320i E46. Richard Göransson finished second in the championship while Nilsson was ninth again. Sandström was involved in a major accident early in the season in which the car was completely destroyed, and Sandström had to sit out the remaining races.

After a couple of struggling years in STCC, 2005 to 2007, Nilsson was back winning races in 2008, 2009 and 2010. "Flash" competed with previous teammate Richard Göransson for the most overall victories in STCC. They both switched places several times between the 2008, 2009 and 2010 seasons, with Göransson finally taking the top spot with 34 versus 33 victories at the end of the 2010 season.

"Flash" finished fifth in the STCC 2007, sixth in 2008 and 2009, ninth in 2010 and eighth in 2011, his last full season in the championship.

== Carrera Cup ==
In 2005, Nilsson took part in the Scandinavian Porsche Carrera Cup that runs as a support class to STCC, alongside his STCC programme in a BMW. This meant that Nilsson did four races each weekend, two in the BMW and two in the Porsche. Luckily for him, both cars were rear wheel drive. Nilsson had more success in Carrera Cup and finished third overall. For 2006, he focused on STCC and his spot was filled by reigning champion Fredrik Ros in Carrera Cup.

Sporting positions
Preceded by Michael Johnsson	Swedish Formula Three Champion; 1989	Succeeded by Niclas Jönsson
Preceded by none	Swedish Touring Car Champion; 1996 - 1997	Succeeded by Fredrik Ekblom
