= Flash Engineering =

Swedish motorsport team

(Sweden) Flash Engineering
- Founded: 1996
- Team principal(s): Jan "Flash" Nilsson
- Current series: STCC; Porsche Carrera Cup Scandinavia
- Former series: ETCC, JTCC, Volvo S60 Challenge
- Teams' Championships: 1 (2007)
- Drivers' Championships: 3 (1996, 1997, 2008)

Flash Engineering is a Swedish motorsport team based in Karlstad founded and owned by Swedish Touring Car Championship (STCC) winner Jan "Flash" Nilsson. The most recent time the team won the STCC-title was in 2008 with driver Richard Göransson. Flash Engineering was affiliated with Volvo until 2005, when Nilsson sold the team to Christian Dahl, and reincorporated it as a new, independent racing team, running BMW and Porsche cars.

Flash Engineering won the STCC-title in 2008 with Richard Göransson. Jan Nilsson won the STCC in its inaugural season (1996), as well as 1997. Fredrik Ros won the 2006 Porsche Carrera Cup for Flash Engineering.

== History ==
The Swedish Touring Car Championship was created in 1996 as a copy of the British Touring Car Championship. Nilsson founded Flash Engineering that year to compete in the championship. Volvo, which had been competing in the BTCC since 1994, partnered with the newly founded Halmstad-based racing team, and provided financial support and the cars. The team initially raced a Volvo 850, and moved to a S40 in 1998. In 2000, the team moved to Karlstad. The team raced a Volvo S60 from 2001 through the 2004 season.

In 2005, Nilsson sold the team to Christian Dahl, who named it Polestar Racing. Nilsson kept the name "Flash Engineering" and formed a new, independent team, driving a BMW 3 Series. Porsche appointed Flash Engineering as promoter for the one make-series Carrera Cup Scandinavia in 2005. The team added a second car for Richard Göransson in 2006, and was replaced by Thed Björk in 2009.

Björk finished fifth in 2010 and second overall in 2009 on the same points at champion Tommy Rustad after a controversial finish to the season. The team also races a Porsche 911 GT3 Cup in the Porsche Carrera Cup Scandinavia, driven by Prince Carl Philip of Sweden who is a licensed race driver, one Porsche for Norwegian Roar Lindland and one Porsche shared by Linus Ohlsson and Matte Karlsson.

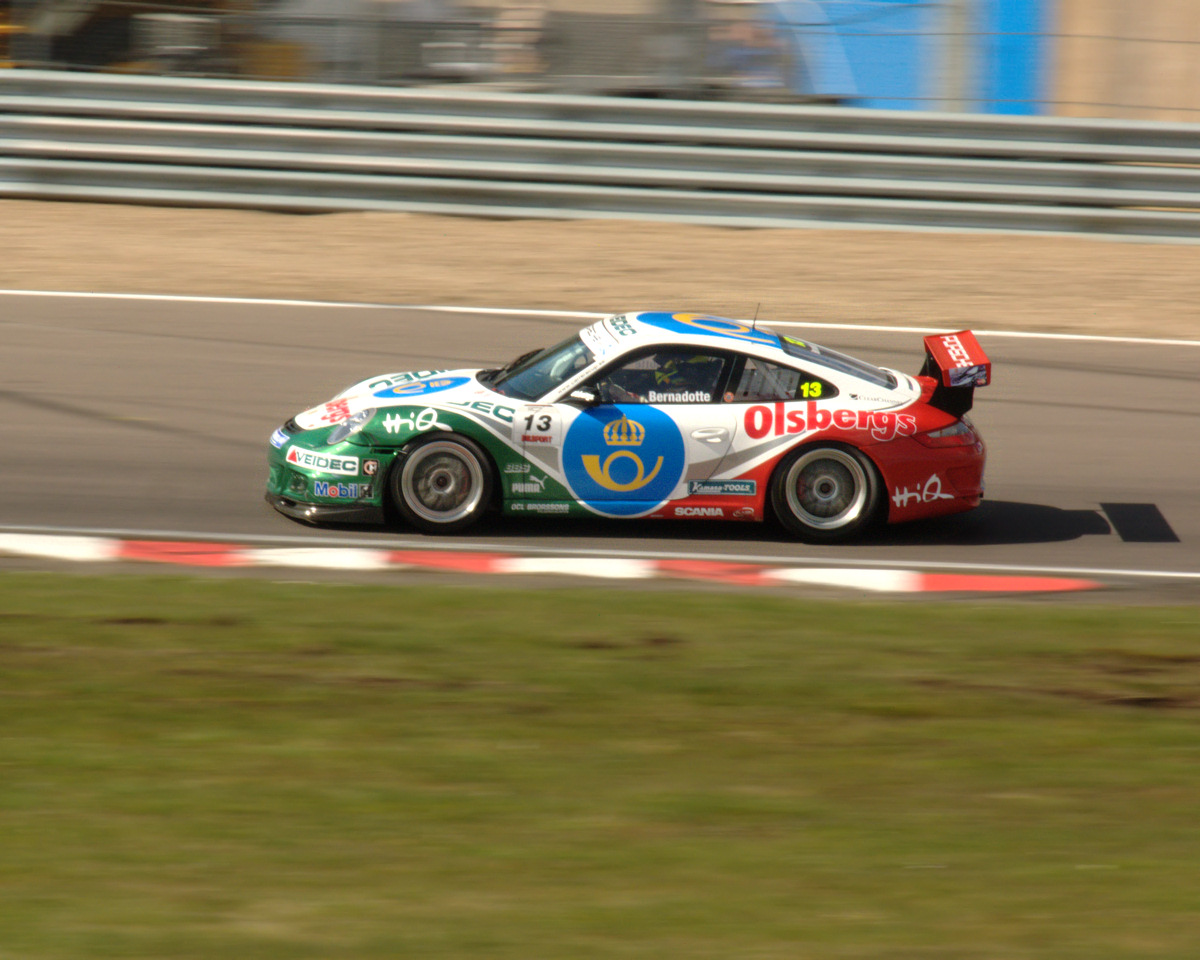
Carl Philip driving a Porsche 997 GT3 Cup in Carrera Cup 2008 Photo: Erik Andersson

For 2011, Björk was replaced by BTCC 2009 champion Colin Turkington. The 28-year-old is going to drive a BMW 320si alongside teammate and team owner Jan "Flash" Nilsson. The team is also going to run three cars in Carrera Cup Scandinavia for Price Carl Philip, Roar Lindland and Matte Karlsson.

Flash co-founded the TTA – Racing Elite League in 2012, entering two Saab 9-3 for Robin Rudholm and Mattias Andersson. After poor results, Nilsson closed the team. The team returned for the 2016 STCC season with drivers Björn Wirdheim, Reuben Kressner and Linus Ohlsson. Wirdheim and Reuben Kressner drove Saabs, whereas Ohlsson drove a Nissan. The team left the STCC for 2017.

== Carrera Cup Scandinavia ==
Flash Engineering is the official organiser of the Porsche one-make series Carrera Cup Scandinavia and the official Scandinavian Porsche Motorsport dealer. The team took over the series in 2005 when the series was close to bankruptcy. In 2009 the series became the biggest Carrera Cup-series in the world with 35 entries.
