= Volvo 850 =

Car model made by Volvo Car Corporation

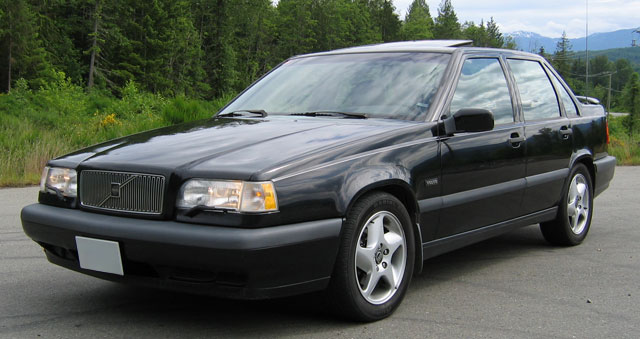
- 1994 Volvo 850 saloon

Overview
- Manufacturer: Volvo Cars
- Production: 1991–1997 (716,903 units)
- Model years: 1992–1997
- Assembly: Sweden: Torslanda (Torslandaverken) Belgium: Ghent (VCG) Canada: Halifax (VHA) Indonesia: North Jakarta (PT. ISMAC) Philippines: Santa Rosa, Laguna (Star Motors)
- Designer: Jan Wilsgaard (1989)

Body and chassis
- Class: Compact executive car (D)
- Body style: 4-door saloon; 5-door estate
- Layout: Front engine; front-wheel drive or four-wheel drive
- Platform: Volvo P80 platform

Powertrain
- Engine: Petrol: 2.0–2.5L I5; (93kW–186kW); Diesel: 2.5L I5; (103kW)
- Transmission: 5-speed Volvo M56 manual; 5-speed Volvo M58 manual; 5-speed Volvo M59 manual; 4-speed Aisin AW50-42LE automatic

Dimensions
- Wheelbase: 2,664 mm (104.9 in)
- Length: saloon: 4,661 mm (183.5 in); estate: 4,709 mm (185.4 in)
- Width: 1,760 mm (69.3 in)
- Height: 1991–1997 saloon: 1,415 mm (55.7 in); 1993–1995 estate: 1,415 mm (55.7 in); 1996–1997 estate: 1,445 mm (56.9 in)
- Kerb weight: saloon: 1,385–1,520 kg (3,053–3,351 lb); estate: 1,465–1,570 kg (3,230–3,461 lb)

Chronology
- Predecessor: Volvo 240
- Successor: Volvo S70 (Sedan)/V70 (Estate)

The Volvo 850 is a compact executive car that was produced by the Swedish manufacturer Volvo Cars from 1991 until 1997. Designed by Jan Wilsgaard, the car was introduced in a saloon body style; an estate style was introduced in 1993.

The Volvo 850 was shown for the first time in June 1991, and the car marked a departure for Volvo, featuring multiple unprecedented features for the company; these included a transverse 5-cylinder engine driving the front wheels, a Delta-link rear axle, a side impact protection system, and a self-adjusting front seat belt mechanism.

The Volvo 850 was succeeded by the Volvo S70 and Volvo V70.

== Models ==
Development of what would become the 800 series first began in 1978. The so-called Project Galaxy ultimately resulted in the Volvo 850, the smaller 400 series, new manufacturing technologies as well as the Volvo Modular engine and M Gearbox lines. When development had finished, Volvo had spent the highest sum in the history of the country on an industrial project in Sweden.

=== 850 ===
The Volvo 850 was introduced in Europe in June 1991, as a 1992 model year car. It was launched with the slogan "A dynamic car with four unique innovations" which referred to the newly developed five cylinder transverse engine, the Delta-link rear axle, the Side Impact Protection System (SIPS), and the self-adjusting seatbelt reel for the front seats. Initially, only the saloon was available, badged as 850 GLT, and came with a choice of 2.5L or 2.0L 20V engines.

In 1992, the 850 was brought to the United States as a 1993 model, becoming Volvo's first front-wheel drive (FWD) car on the U.S. market. A wide variety of Volvo 850 models were sold, with the first-generation models produced between 1993 and 1994. These included a CNG-powered Bi-Fuel model and a diesel engined 850 badged as 850 TDI. The 850 was available in both saloon and estate versions, with manual 5-speed or automatic 4-speed transmissions.

For the 850, Volvo created what it called "Delta-link semi-independent rear suspension". Volvo held a U.S. patent for rear axle bushings that compress under load, giving the Volvo 850 passive rear steering. It also has a tight turning circle, 10.2 m (33.5 ft), and is considered very maneuverable. By comparison, later large Volvos had a 11.9 m (39.0 ft) turning circle.

The estate version of the 850 went on sale in February 1993 for all markets. The 850 saloon features an interior space of 2.80 cubic metres (99 cu ft). This is slightly more than the 2.78 cubic metres (98 cu ft) of the 2004 Mercedes-Benz E-Class, even though the car is reasonably compact on the outside. This space is achieved by mounting the in-line 5-cylinder engine transversely (from the left to the right of the car) under the hood. Full power equipment was standard on all 1993 850 models, with a sunroof and built-in child booster seat in the back folding arm rest.

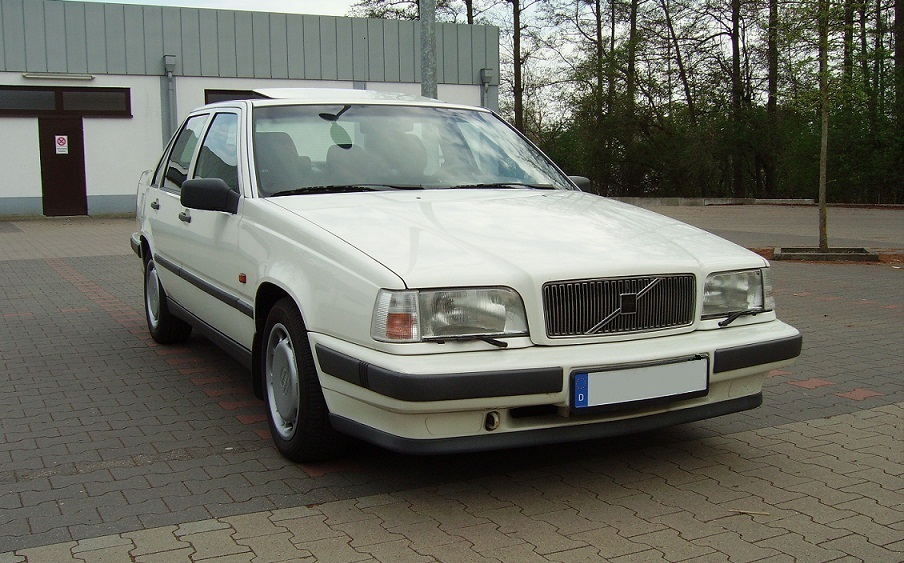
Pre-facelift Volvo 850 (Europe)

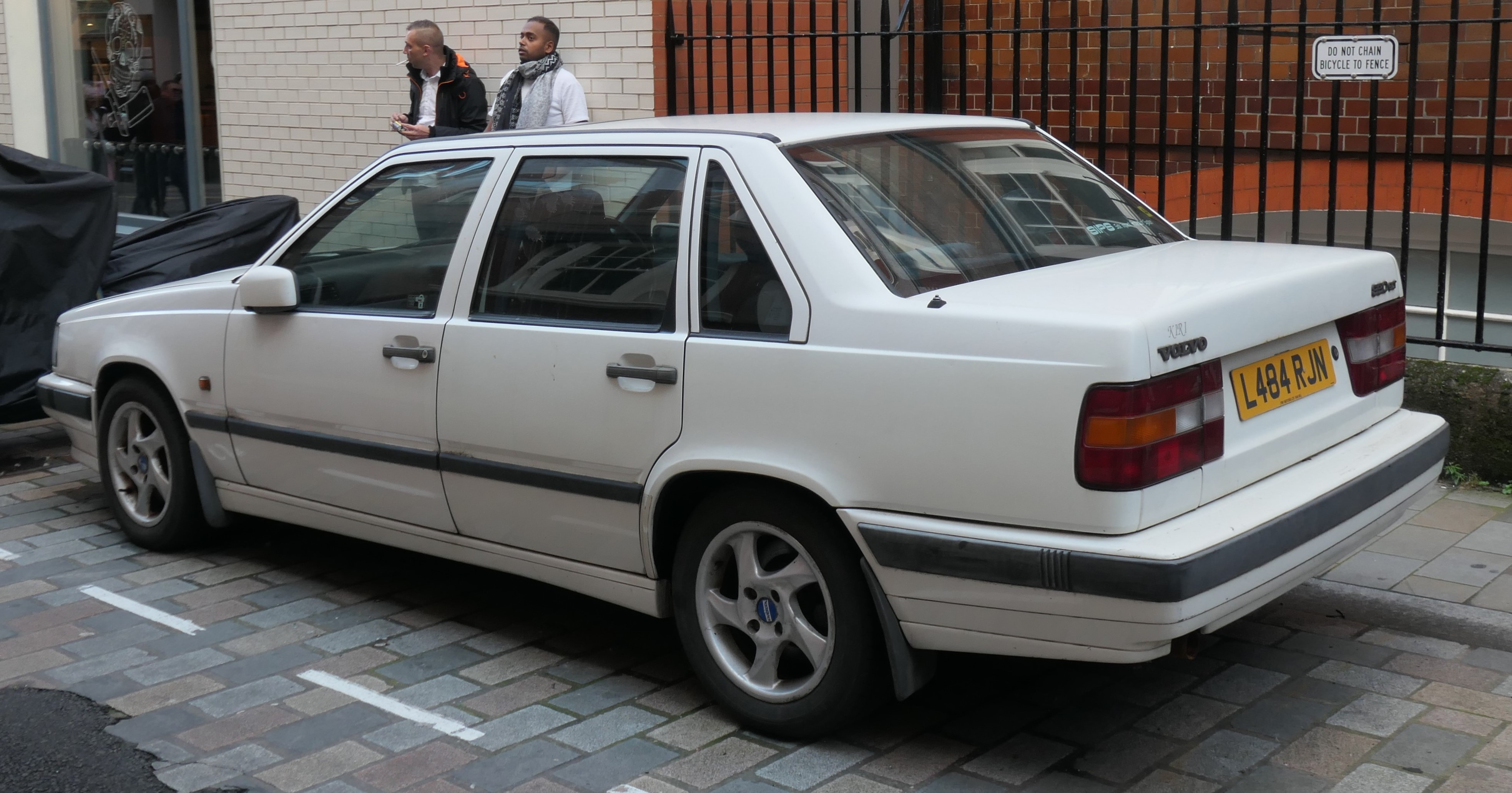
Pre-facelift Volvo 850, rear (Europe)

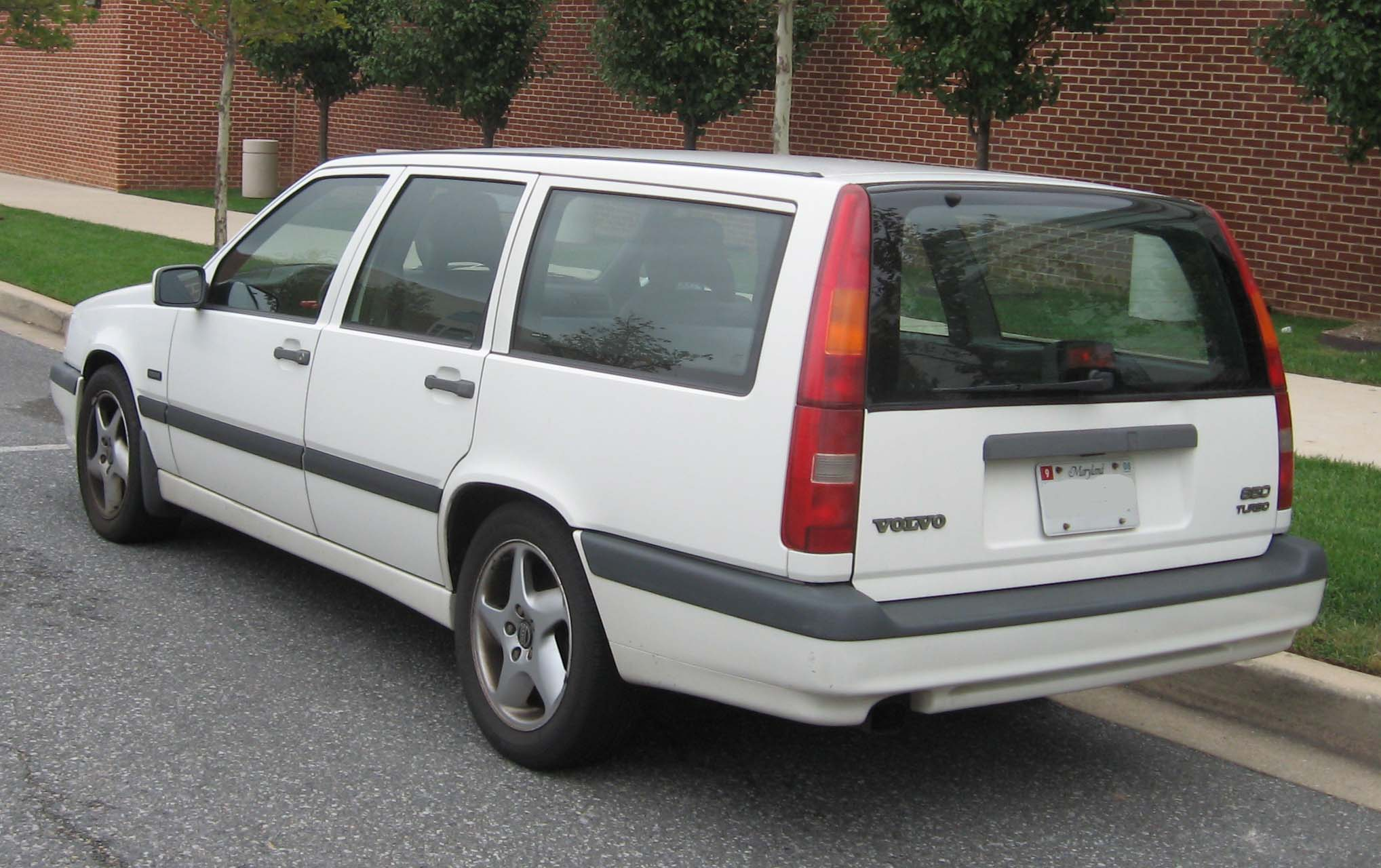
Volvo 850 estate (United States)

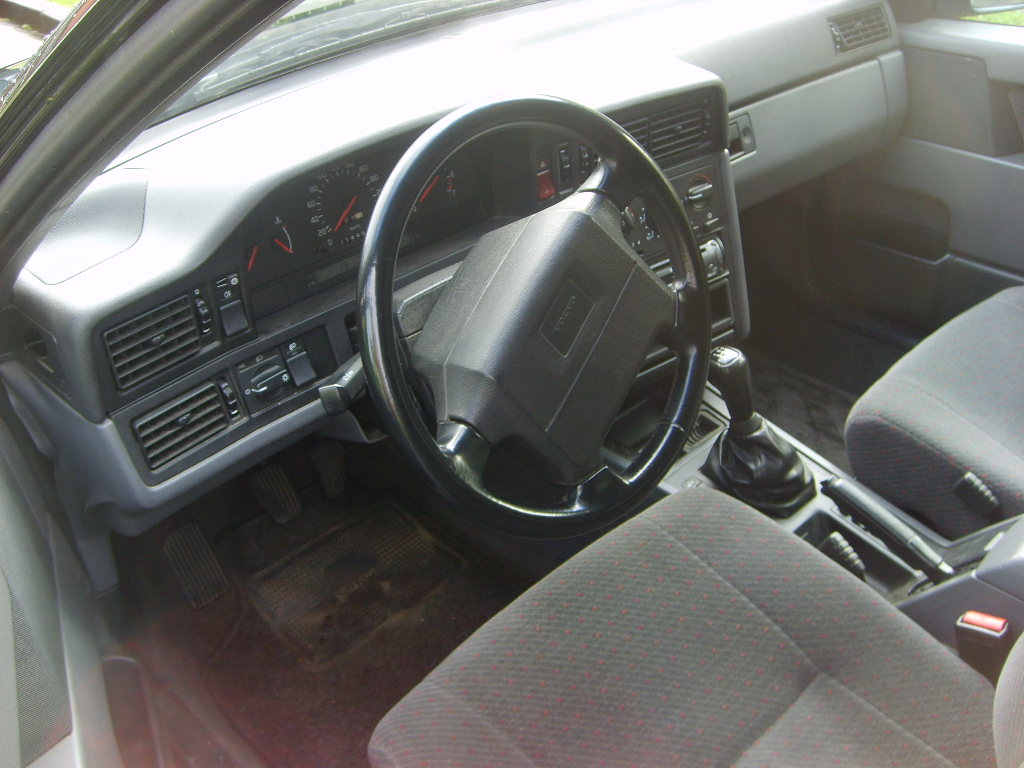
Volvo 850 interior

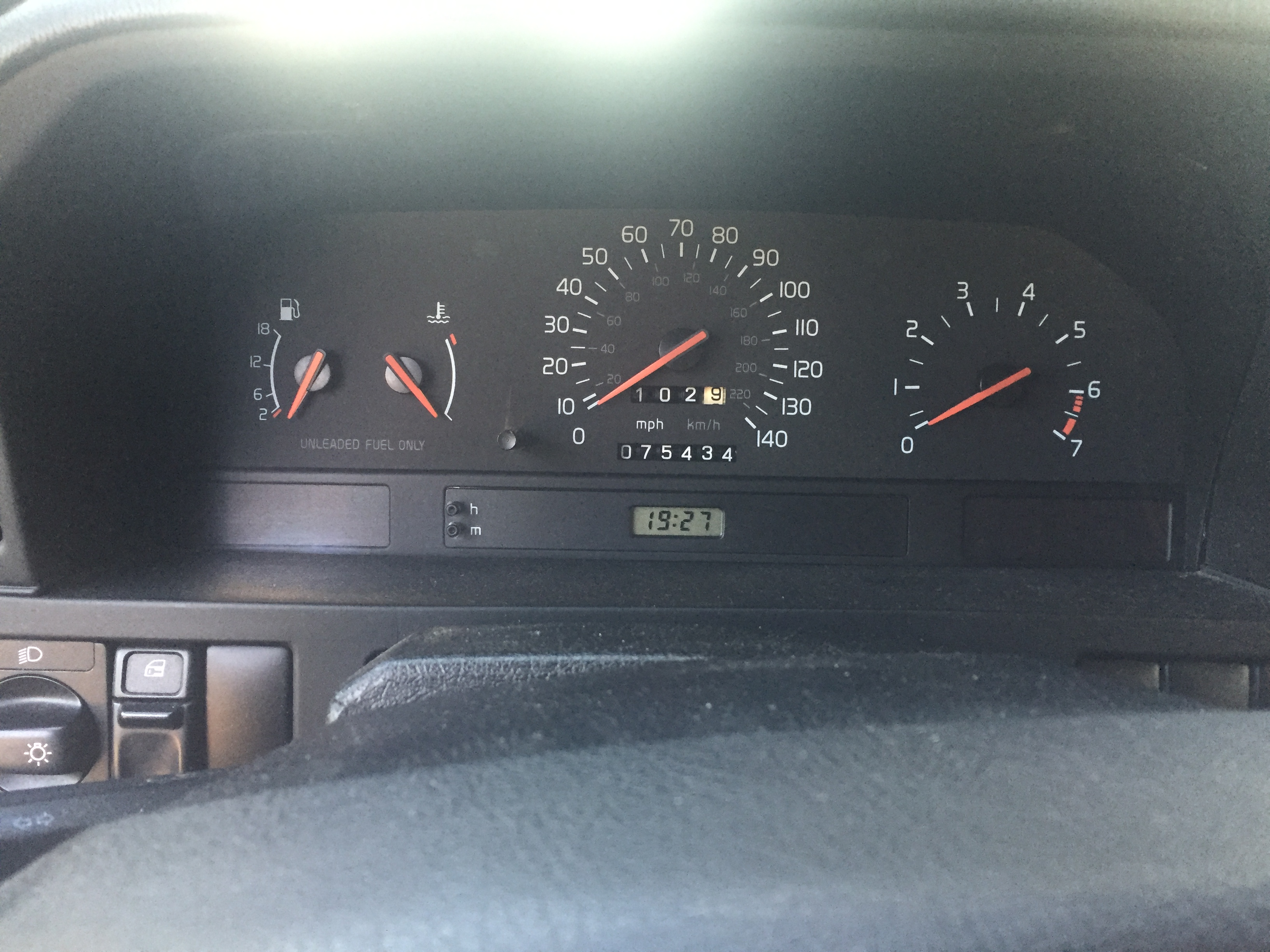
Dashboard instrument cluster of a 1996 Volvo 850.

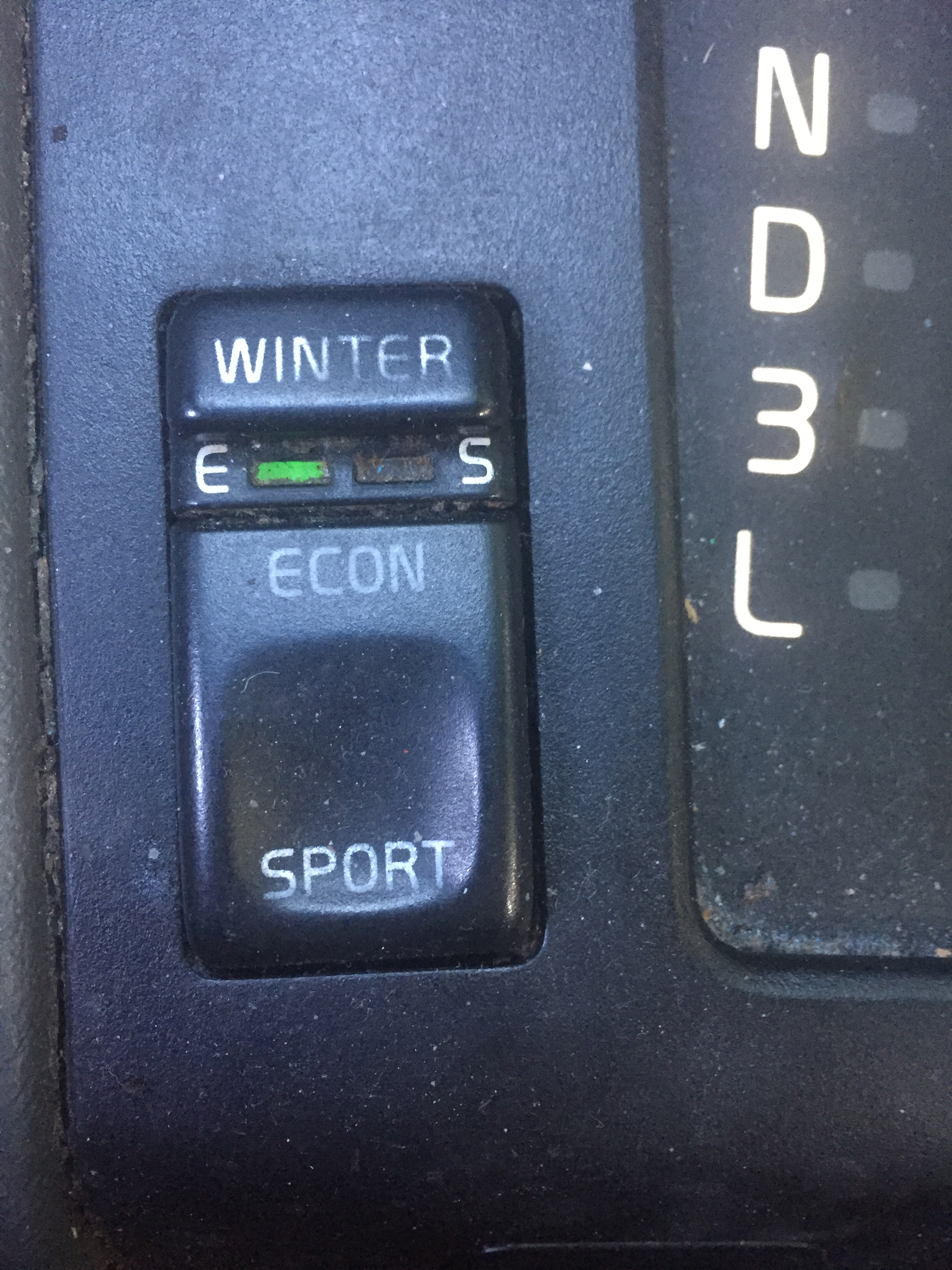
Button on Volvo 850 to select between economy and sport modes, as well as button to select winter traction mode.

Beginning in 1994, a facelift for all subsequent 850 models was introduced; this facelift subtly altered the visual appearance of the car, featuring new front and rear bumpers, new headlights and indicators on the outside, and a new switchgear on the inside. The same year, the 850 estate was awarded the Japanese "Good Design Grand Prize" award from the Ministry of International Trade and Industry. In August 1994, the 850 Turbo was introduced for the 1994 model year as was the new 2.4L 10V engine (or 2.3L turbo), and the T5 making 222 hp (166 kW; 225 PS). The 1994 850 Turbo is able to accelerate from 0–60 mph (0–97 km/h) in 7.1 seconds. In terms of technical features, Volvo switched from 4-bolt to 5-bolt hubs, made ABS standard on all markets and introduced a new A/C system. Other options during the model run included features such as traction control, leather interior, power glass sunroof, power seats, heated seats, remote keyless entry, automatic climate control, and automatic transmission.

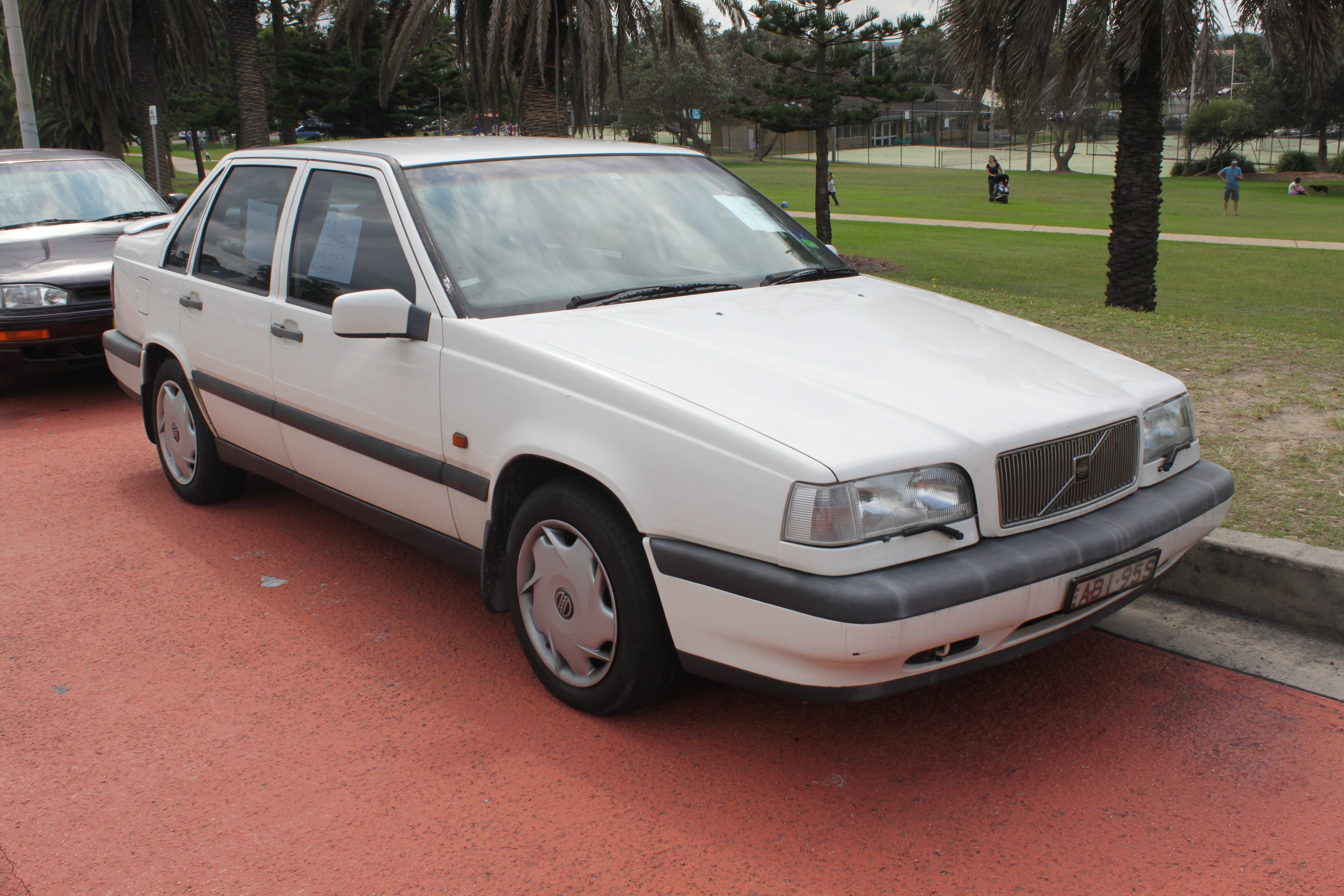
Post-facelift Volvo 850 (Australia)

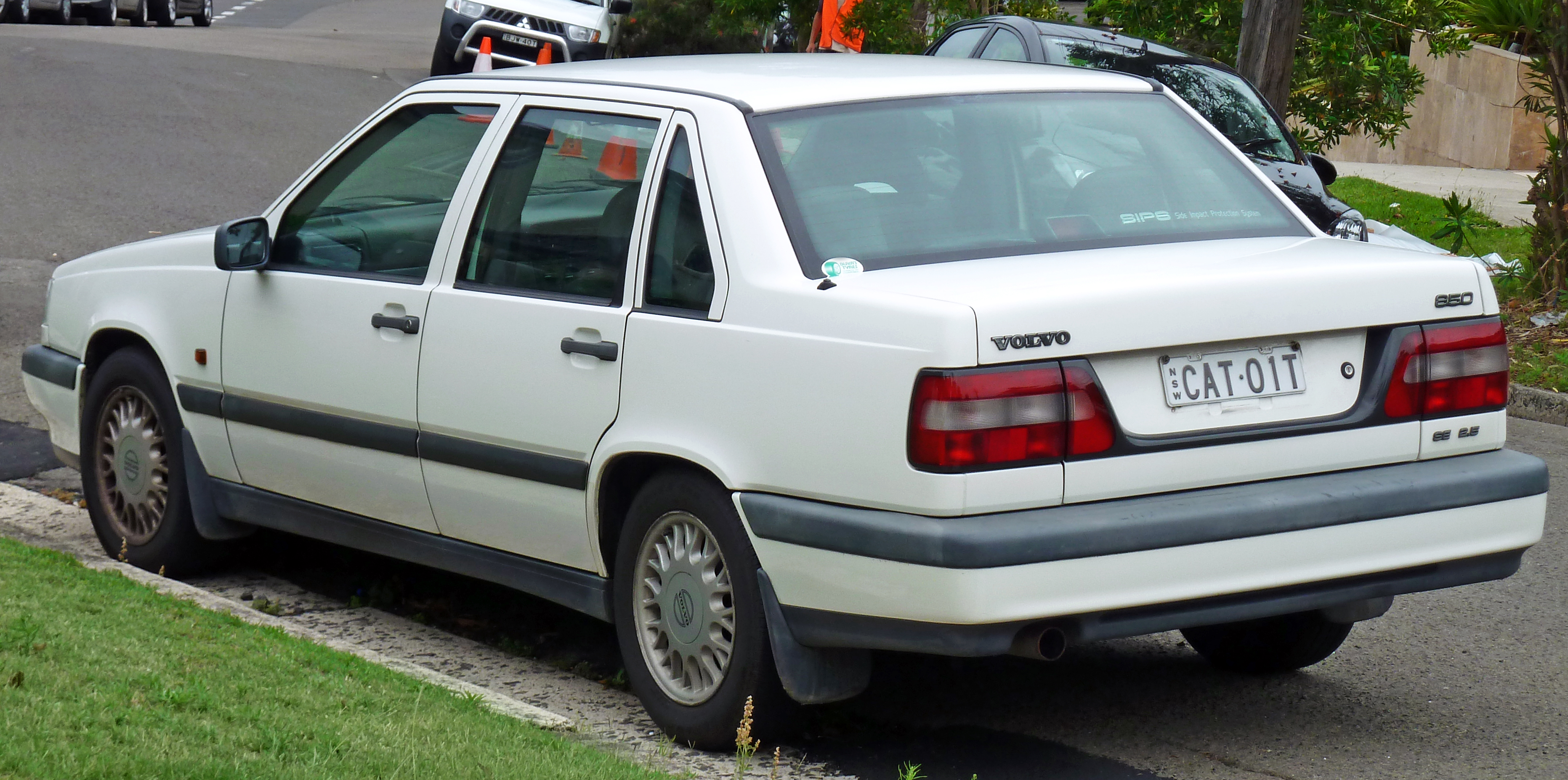
Post-facelift Volvo 850, rear (Australia)

Beginning with their 1995 model year, Volvo introduced the SIPS-Bag on the 850; these airbags were included as standard equipment on the 1995 Turbo models, and were optional for an additional $500 on other 850 models. This made the Volvo 850 the first mass-produced car in the world to feature the side-impact airbags. The SIPS became standard equipment for all new Volvo cars beginning with the 1996 model year. In 1995, the Volvo 850 was ranked the fourth-safest vehicle on the market by the Insurance Institute for Highway Safety.

In 1996, a "Platinum" edition of the 850 Turbo was available. The exterior paint for these models came in a metallic pearl platinum-colour and had special 16 inch alloy wheels. The interior was fitted with leather seats and burled walnut accents. Only 1,400 of these were imported for the U.S. market. 1,000 of which came in the sedan variant, while the other 400 were wagons.

In 1997, the 850 Turbo was rebadged as the 850 "T-5."

=== 850 T-5R ===
For 1995, the special limited edition 850 T-5R was offered, and was a commercial success, leading Volvo to produce a second run in 1996. Originally, it was to be called 850 Plus 5. The vehicle was based on the 850 Turbo, utilizing the B5234T5 engine with a special ECU (Bosch #628 in U.S and #629 in EU) that added an additional 2 psi (0.1 bar) of turbocharger boost pressure, giving the engine an extra 18 hp (13 kW; 18 PS) for a total of 243 hp (181 kW) and 250 lb⋅ft (340 N⋅m) of torque. The engine was mated to a 4-speed automatic transmission or 5-speed manual transmission, the latter of which was not available in the United States. The T-5R was renowned as a sleeper car; despite its boxy, understated appearance, it boasted a drag coefficient of 0.29 and was capable of accelerating from 0 to 60 mph (97 km/h) in 5.8 – 6.0 seconds (depending on transmission and body type). The top speed was electronically limited to 152.2 mph (244.9 km/h). The vehicle came standard with Pirelli P-Zero tyres, providing lateral grip of 0.88 g. The engine tuning was co-developed with Porsche, as was the transmission and other powertrain components. Porsche also aided in designing some of the interior, such as the Alcantara seat inserts. These cars came as standard with nearly every feature available, only a handful of options – such as heated rear seats – were available. On the North American market only two options could be chosen, a trunk-mounted Alpine 6-CD changer and no-cost 16" wheels for a smoother, more comfortable ride and driveability in snow when using all-season tires.

Also included in the 1995 T-5R package was a front bumper with a lip, rear spoiler, side skirts, polished aluminum door sills, special graphite leather and Alcantara seats, and a black interior with deep walnut wood grain accents. Both yellow and black versions came with the same black interior as the only choice. The T-5R has an additional badge to the left of the "850" on the trunk, referred to as "The Motorsport badge". The standard road wheel was the titanium-gray 5-spoke 17×7 "Titan". 1995 was the only year that the a model was badged as a "T-5R"; the following year, as Volvo recognized the vehicle's popularity, the model was renewed with the designation "850R".

The T-5R featured side airbags installed in the seat cushions. The side airbags were integrated into the rest of the Volvo model line the following year as an option, and became standard a year after that; other manufacturers soon followed suit. The car was also fitted with an early example of daytime running lamps. Also, just like the 940, it had three-point seatbelts at all five seating positions (previously, cars had only a lap belt for the center rear seat). The T-5R also used the OBDII diagnostics system, a year before OBDII was made an automotive standard.

6964 T-5Rs were produced worldwide, of which the largest market was Germany (1,433), Italy (914; 2.0 turbo), United States (876), Japan (749), Netherlands (489), UK (440), Sweden (321), Spain (185), and Canada (103).

The 1995 850 T-5R was limited in exterior paint color choices:

- Cream Yellow – 2,537 worldwide including saloon and estate. Only 346 sedans in this color were imported into the United States; wagons, only 49. Cream Yellow was marketed in the Australian market as 'Faded Yellow' to compensate for the unrelenting Australian sun. The Gothenburg engineers were aware of the 1990s paint technology, and the fact it wouldn't retain its deep luster over the course of time, and hence, the clever marketing descriptor, 'Faded Yellow' was coined.
- Stone Black – 2,516 worldwide including saloon and estate
- Olive Green metallic – 1,911 worldwide including saloon and estate

Colour distribution was limited in some countries, that is, not all countries got all three colours: Norway only received yellow, for instance.

Two white, two Aubergine and three grey T-5Rs were also produced. The white and aubergine cars were preproduction cars whereas the grey ones were produced by special demand for the Arabian market. Both aubergines, at least one grey and at least one white T-5R were still registered in Sweden as late as 2014.

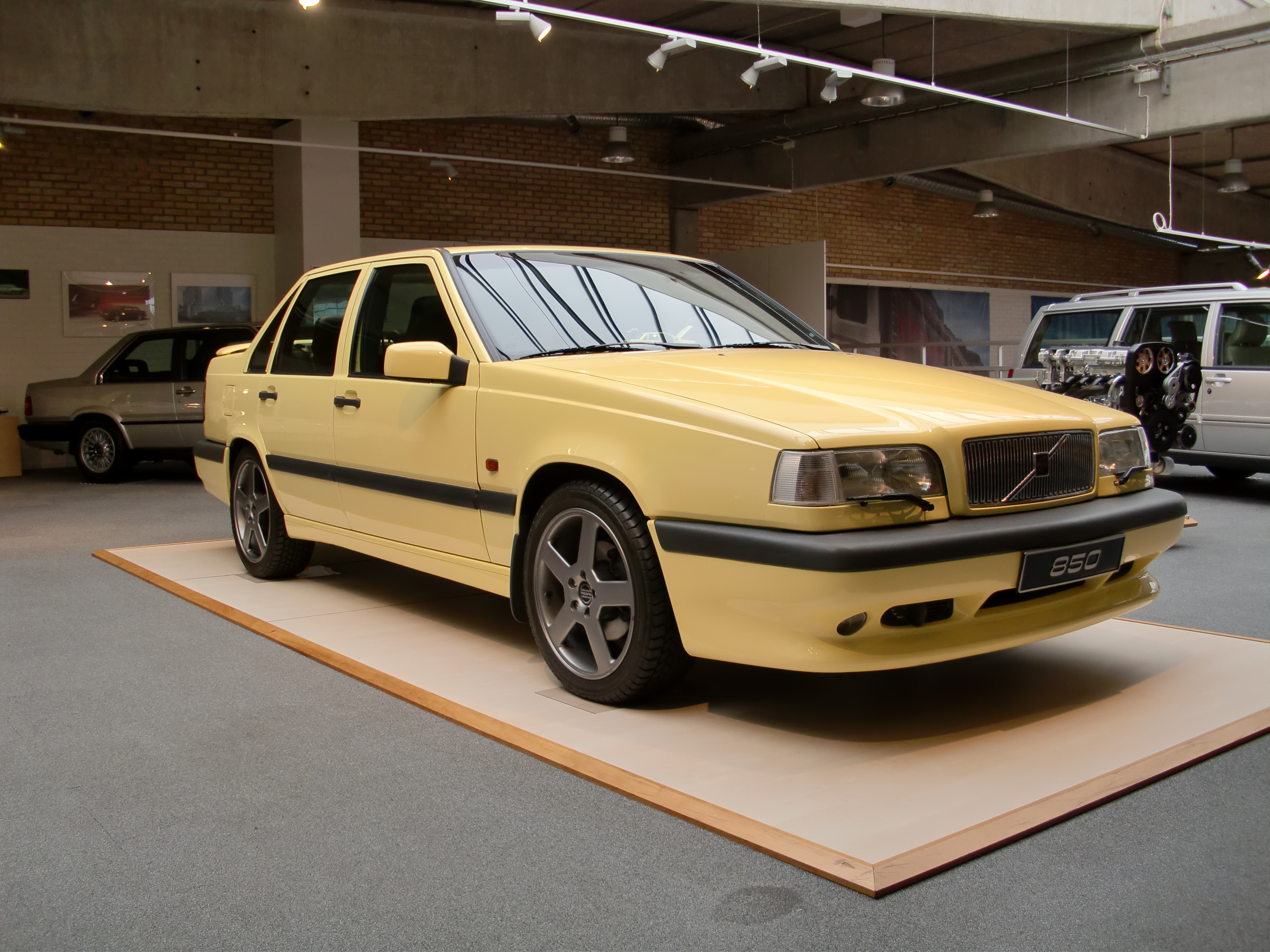
Volvo 850 T-5R saloon at the Volvo Museum (Europe)

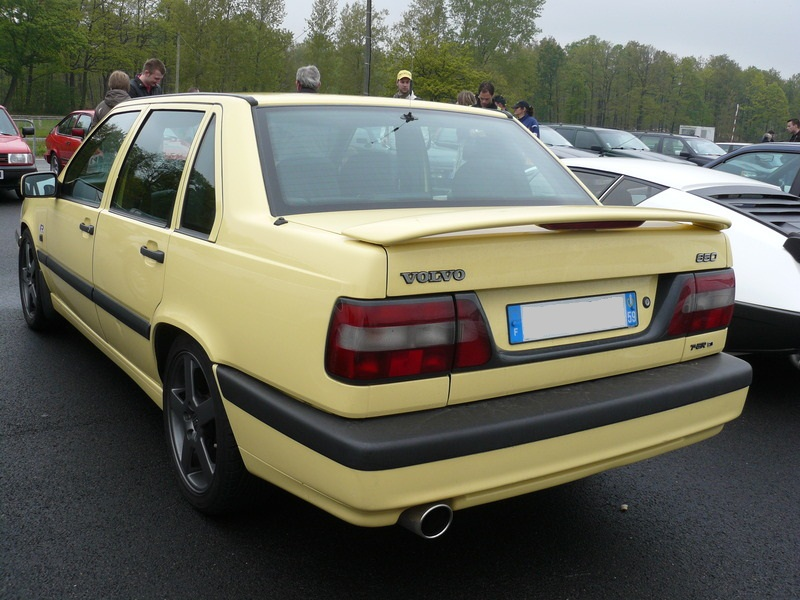
Volvo 850 T-5R saloon rear (Europe)

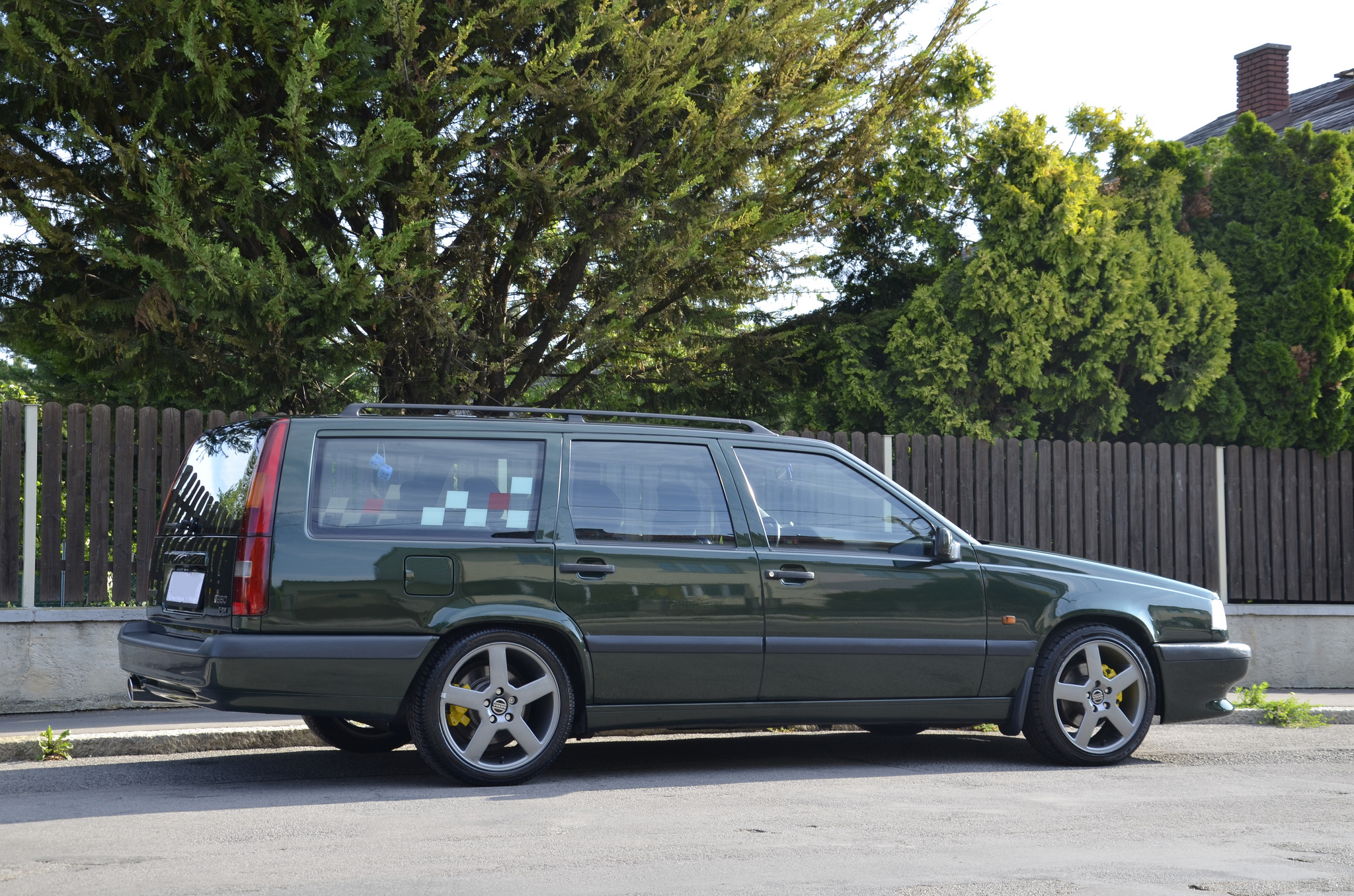
Volvo 850 T-5R estate in green (Europe)

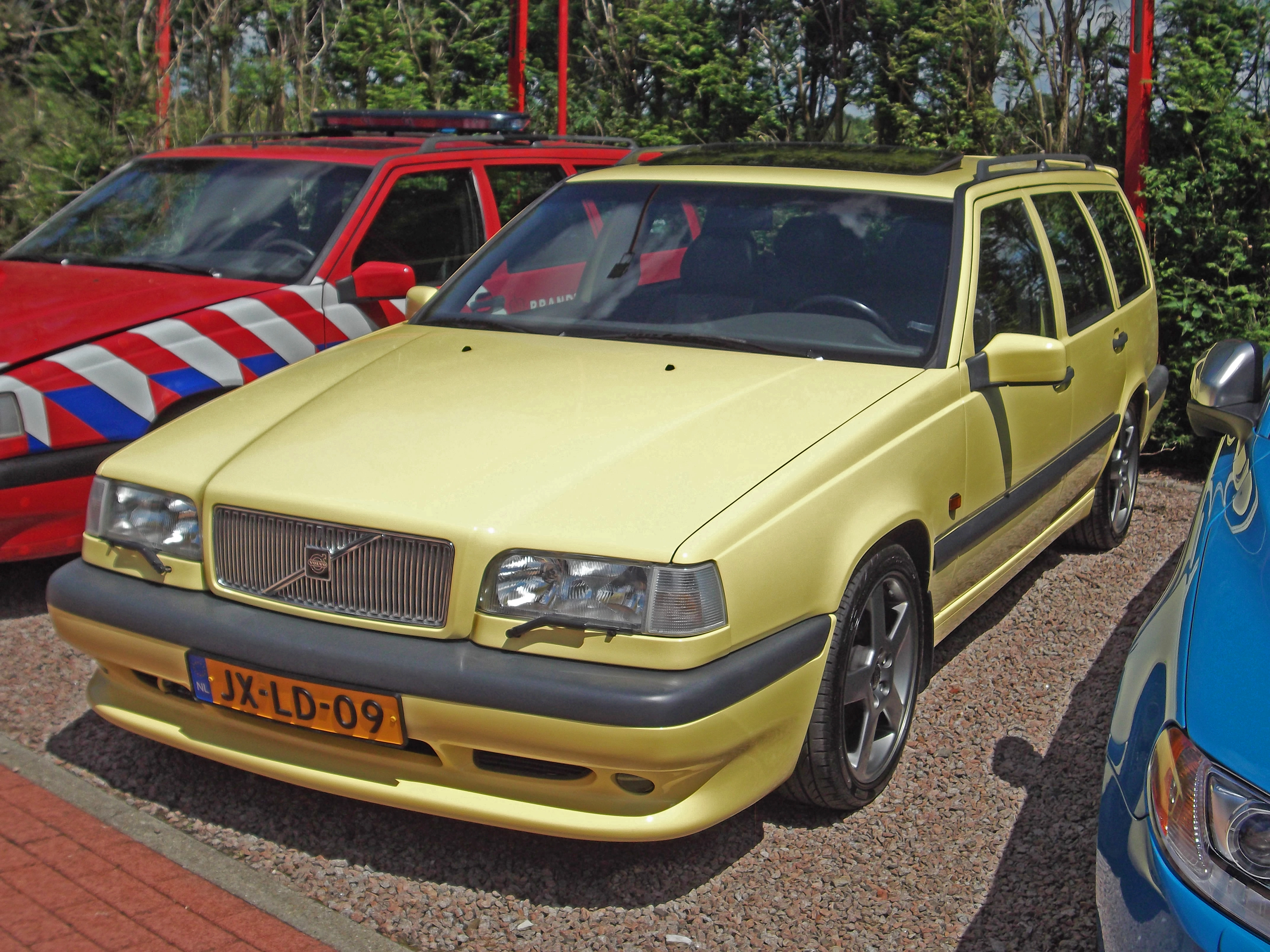
Volvo 850 Estate T-5R in yellow

=== 850 R ===
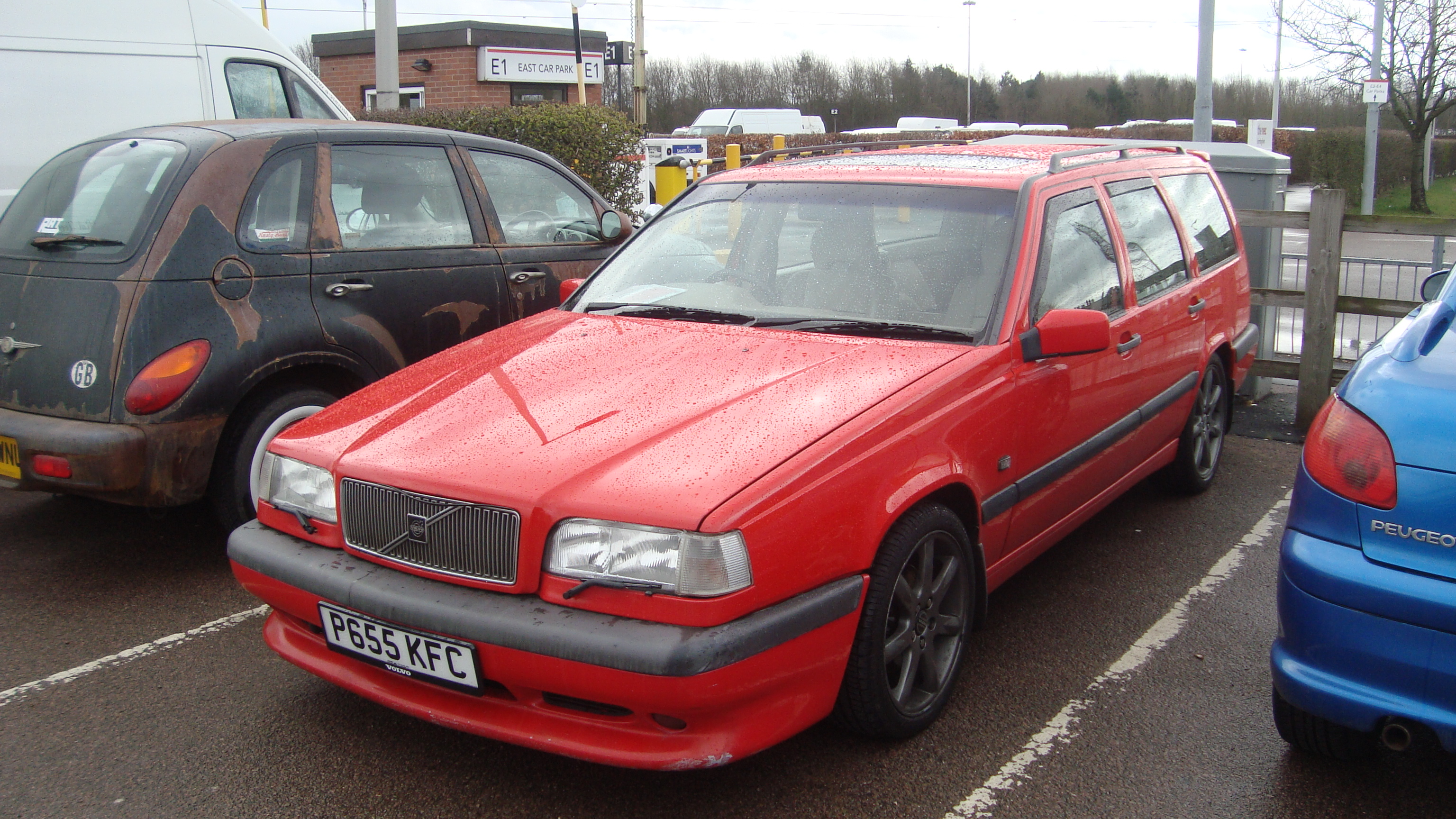
Volvo 850 R estate, England

In the spring of 1996, Volvo introduced a new high-performance Volvo 850 as a replacement for the hugely successful limited edition T-5R. Volvo decided there should be no direct successor to the T-5R, but due to its success, Volvo decided to develop a new high-performance model. The new car, based on the T-5R, was called the 850 R, which again came in either saloon or sport wagon editions.

The only colours available were Bright Red, Black Stone, Dark Grey Pearl, Dark Olive Pearl, Turquoise Pearl and Polar White. In the U.S. market only Bright Red, Polar White and Black Stone were available. Cream yellow was discontinued for the 850 R. The saloon featured a newly designed rear spoiler; spoiler was now standard on the estate. The interior upgrades included bucket style heavily bolstered 'sport' front seats (Alcantara centre with leather bolsters), Alcantara door cards, 2-tone leather steering wheel, stainless steel '850' kick plates and R branded over mats. A 200w amplifier was also added to the 8-speaker audio system as was the option to have an SC-805/815 in-dash CD player (some markets).

For a limited time in 1996 only, Volvo offered a new heavy duty manual transmission designed specifically for the 850 R (excluding U.S. market), called the M59, which featured a viscous coupling limited-slip differential. Furthermore, the M59 equipped cars were fitted with the B5234T4 2.3-litre 5-cylinder engine featuring a larger TD04HL-16T turbo, re-designed turbo manifold and intercooler, unique ECU with Motronic 4.3, uprated fuel pressure sensor and a heavy duty clutch. These modifications enabled the manual transmission cars to produce 250 PS (184 kW) and 350 N⋅m (258 lb⋅ft) versus 240 PS (177 kW) and 330 N⋅m (243 lb⋅ft) for the automatic transmission.

Due to encumbrances placed on engine volume by the Italian government, 850 Rs sold in Italy were based on the 2.0-litre 850 Turbo, producing 211 PS (155 kW). The transmission was the standard AW/50-42 used in all U.S. 850s, the M59 being available in other countries.

=== 850 AWD ===
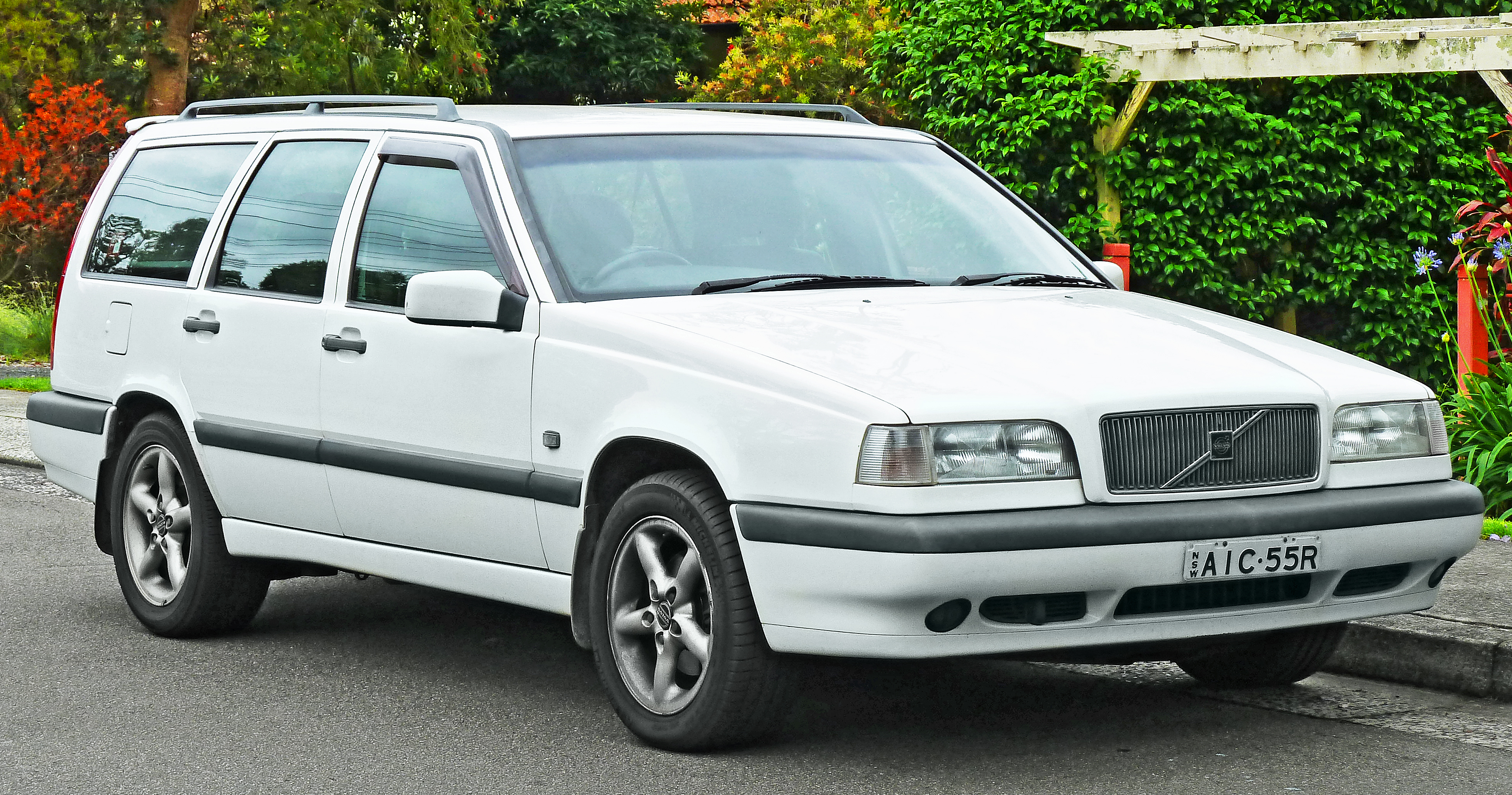
Volvo 850 AWD estate, Australia

In November 1996, Volvo launched the 850 AWD. Available as a 1997 model it came only in estate configuration, featured standard all-wheel drive and was only available in certain markets. All cars were equipped with the new 2.5L turbo engine developing 193 PS (142 kW; 190 hp). The only available transmission was a 5-speed manual. Ride height was marginally increased over FWD models, a newly developed multilink rear axle with rear self-leveling suspension was standard. Visual features included front and rear mudflaps, the exhaust exiting on the right rear with the bumper being provisioned for dual outlets and specific AWD badging. The Volvo 850 was discontinued after the Volvo S70 began production in 1996 and phased out its production by 1997.

== Engines ==
Petrol engines
Model	Engine code	Year(s)	Fuel Delivery	Power at rpm	Torque at rpm	Displacement	0–100 km/h (0–62 mph)	Top speed	Ref(s).
2.0 10V	B5202FS	1995–1997	Siemens Fenix 5.2	126 PS (93 kW; 124 hp) at 6100	170 N⋅m (125 lb⋅ft) at 4800	1,984 cc (121.1 cu in)	11.7s (saloon); 11.9s (estate)	194 km/h (121 mph)	
2.0 20V	B5204FS	1992–1996	Bosch LH 3.2 Jetronic^{[a]}	143 PS (105 kW; 141 hp) at 6500	220 N⋅m (160 lb⋅ft) at 3800	1,984 cc (121.1 cu in)	10.5s	203 km/h (126 mph)	
2.3 20V	B5234FS	1994–1996 (Thailand)	Bosch LH 3.2 Jetronic^{[a]}	170 PS (125 kW; 168 hp) at 6500	184 N⋅m (136 lb⋅ft) at 3800	10.5s	203 km/h (126 mph)		
2.4 20V	B5244F	1994–1997	Bosch	148 PS (109 kW; 146 hp) at 6500	197 N⋅m (145 lb⋅ft) at 3700	2,319 cc (141.5 cu in)	11.3s (saloon); 11.6s (estate)	196 km/h (122 mph)	
2.5 10V	B5252S	1994–1997	Siemens Fenix 5.2	144 PS (106 kW; 142 hp) at 5400	206 N⋅m (152 lb⋅ft) at 3600	2,435 cc (148.6 cu in)	10.0s	205 km/h (127 mph)	
2.5 20V	B5254FS	1991–1995	Bosch LH 3.2 Jetronic^{[a]}	170 PS (125 kW; 168 hp) at 6200	220 N⋅m (162 lb⋅ft) at 3300	2,435 cc (148.6 cu in)	8.9s (saloon); 9.2s (estate)	210 km/h (130 mph)	
2.5T; 2.5T AWD	B5254T	1996–1997	Bosch Motronic 4.4	193 PS (142 kW; 190 hp) at 5100	270 N⋅m (199 lb⋅ft) at 1800	2,435 cc (148.6 cu in)	7.8s	225 km/h (140 mph)	
T-5 2.0	B5204T	1993–1997	Bosch Motronic 4.3	211 PS (155 kW; 208 hp) at 5000	300 N⋅m (221 lb⋅ft) at 2200	1,984 cc (121.1 cu in)	7.3s	230 km/h (143 mph)	
T-5 2.3	B5234T	1993–1997	Bosch Motronic 4.3	225 PS (165 kW; 222 hp) at 5200	340 N⋅m (251 lb⋅ft) at 2000	2,319 cc (141.5 cu in)	7.2s	240 km/h (149 mph)	
T-5R 2.0	B5204T	1995–1996	Bosch Motronic 4.3	211 PS (155 kW; 208 hp) at 5400	300 N⋅m (221 lb⋅ft) at 1900	1,984 cc (121.1 cu in)	7.3s	229 km/h (142 mph)	
T-5R (Auto)	B5234T5	1995–1996	Bosch Motronic 4.3	225 PS (165 kW; 222 hp) at 5600; 240 PS (177 kW; 237 hp) with overboost	300 N⋅m (221 lb⋅ft) at 2000	2,319 cc (141.5 cu in)	7.4s	245 km/h (152 mph)	
T-5R (Manual)	B5234T5	1995–1996	Bosch Motronic 4.3	225 PS (165 kW; 222 hp) at 5600; 240 PS (177 kW; 237 hp) with overboost	330 N⋅m (243 lb⋅ft) at 3000	2,319 cc (141.5 cu in)	6.9s	245 km/h (152 mph)	
R (Auto)	B5234T5	1996–1997	Bosch Motronic 4.3	240 PS (177 kW; 237 hp) at 5400	300 N⋅m (221 lb⋅ft) at	2,319 cc (141.5 cu in)	7.5s	235 km/h (146 mph)	
R (Manual)	B5234T4	1996–1997	Bosch Motronic 4.3	250 PS (184 kW; 247 hp) at 5400	350 N⋅m (258 lb⋅ft) at 2400	2,319 cc (141.5 cu in)	6.7s	255 km/h (158 mph)	

Diesel engine
Model	Engine code	Year(s)	Power	Torque at rpm	Displacement	0–100 km/h (0–62 mph)	Top speed	Refs.
TDI	D5252T^{[b]} (MSA 15.7)	1996–1997	140 PS (103 kW; 138 hp)	290 N⋅m (214 lb⋅ft) at 1900	2,461 cc (150.2 cu in)	9.9 s	200 km/h (124 mph)	

Notes

- a B5254S: 1992–1995 have Bosch LH 3.2. In 1996, both Bosch LH 3.2 and Bosch Motronic 4.4 was fitted. As of 1997 only Bosch Motronic 4.4 was fitted. Please see Volvo Owners Manual and press release for the 1995 T-5R.
- b Modified 2.5L VAG TDI engine.

== Motorsport ==
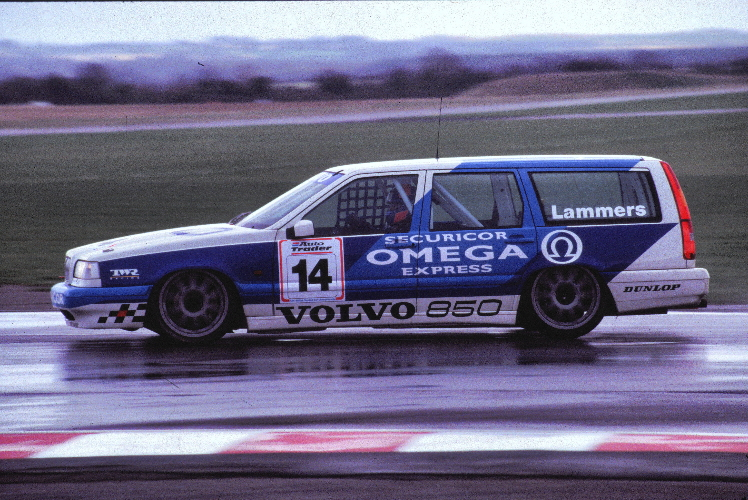
BTCC Volvo 850 Estate built to Super Touring regulations.

Harvey driving the 850 at Brands Hatch in 1995

Volvo joined forces with Tom Walkinshaw Racing (TWR) to compete in the British Touring Car Championship (BTCC) in 1994 with drivers Rickard Rydell and Jan Lammers. The company made an unusual decision in developing an 850 Estate Super Touring Car rather than a saloon as its rivals. Despite much criticism, the 850 Estate performed well but scored no podiums. Its drivers ranked 14th and 15th in the Drivers' championship, while Volvo finished eighth in the Manufacturers' standings.

For 1995, TWR built a Saloon version due to changes in BTCC regulations regarding aerodynamic aids which effectively ended any chance of the Estate being competitive. The 850 Saloons qualified on pole position 12 times and won six races. Rydell finished third in points, Tim Harvey was fifth, and Volvo placed third in the Manufacturers' championship. In 1996, an improved 850 Saloon achieved five race wins. Rydell repeated a third place in the Drivers' championship, whereas Kelvin Burt placed 11th. Volvo again finished third in the Manufacturers' Championship.

Volvo also entered the 850 for its BTCC drivers at the World Touring Car Cup. In addition, driver-owner Jan "Flash" Nilsson won the Swedish Touring Car Championship in 1996 and 1997 with an 850.

In Australia Volvo Dealer Racing entered an 850 T-5 for Peter Brock and Tony Scott in the 1994 James Hardie 12 Hour production car race at Bathurst, finishing 25th. It entered the Australian Super Touring Championship with an estate version driven by Scott in 1995, a saloon version driven by Brock in 1996 and Jim Richards in 1997. Two cars were entered in the 1997 Bathurst 1000.

== See also ==
- Volvo S70, succeeding saloon model, largely a facelift version
- Volvo V70, succeeding estate model, largely a facelift version
- Volvo 440/460, compact models bearing a similar design (post-facelift)

== Works cited ==
- Ekstedt, Eskil; Lundin, Rolf A.; Söderholm, Anders; Wirdenius, Hans (2003). Neo-Industrial Organising: Renewal by Action and Knowledge Formation in a Project-intensive Economy. New York: Routledge. ISBN 978-1-134-63025-7.
- Walton, Mary (1999). Car: A Drama of the American Workplace. New York: W. W. Norton & Company. ISBN 978-0-393-31861-6.
