= List of 2025 motorsport champions =

2025 motorsport champions
Previous: 2024	Next: 2026

This list of 2025 motorsport champions is a list of national or international motorsport series with championships decided by the points or positions earned by a driver from multiple races where the season was completed during the 2025 calendar year.

== Dirt oval racing ==
Series	Champion	Refer
Lucas Oil Late Model Dirt Series	(United States) Devin Moran	
World of Outlaws Late Model Series	(United States) Bobby Pierce	
World of Outlaws Late Model Series	Teams: (United States) Bobby Pierce Racing	
World of Outlaws Sprint Car Series	(United States) David Gravel	
World of Outlaws Sprint Car Series	Teams: (United States) Big Game Motorsports	
New Zealand Superstock Championship	(New Zealand) Todd Hemingway	

== Drag racing ==
Series	Champion	Refer
NHRA Mission Foods Drag Racing Series	Top Fuel: (United States) Doug Kalitta	2025 NHRA Mission Foods Drag Racing Series
NHRA Mission Foods Drag Racing Series	Funny Car: (United States) Austin Prock	2025 NHRA Mission Foods Drag Racing Series
NHRA Mission Foods Drag Racing Series	Pro Stock: (United States) Dallas Glenn	2025 NHRA Mission Foods Drag Racing Series
NHRA Mission Foods Drag Racing Series	Pro Stock Motorcycle: (United States) Richard Gadson	2025 NHRA Mission Foods Drag Racing Series
FIA European Drag Racing Championship	Top Fuel: (Sweden) Susanne Callin	
FIA European Drag Racing Championship	Top Methanol: (Belgium) Sandro Bellio	
FIA European Drag Racing Championship	Pro Stock Car: (Sweden) Robin Norén	
FIA European Drag Racing Championship	Pro Stock Modified: (Finland) Jere Rantaniemi	

== Drifting ==
Series	Champion	Refer
D1 Grand Prix	(Japan) Hideyuki Fujino	2025 D1 Grand Prix series
D1 Grand Prix	D1 Lights: (Japan) Genki Mogami	2025 D1 Grand Prix series
D1NZ	(Australia) Luke Fink	
D1NZ	Pro-Sport: (New Zealand) Deane Young	
Drift Masters	(Republic of Ireland) Conor Shanahan	2025 Drift Masters season
Drift Masters	Nations Cup: (Republic of Ireland) Ireland	2025 Drift Masters season
Formula Drift	PRO: (Republic of Ireland) James Deane	2025 Formula Drift season
Formula Drift	PROSPEC: (United States) Cody Buchanan	2025 Formula Drift season
Formula Drift	Auto Cup: (Japan) Toyota	2025 Formula Drift season
Formula Drift	Tires: (Singapore) GT Radial	2025 Formula Drift season

== Kart racing ==
Series	Champion	Refer
FIA Karting World Championship	OK: (Belgium) Thibaut Ramaekers	
FIA Karting World Championship	KZ: (Netherlands) Senna van Walstijn	
FIA Karting World Championship	OK-J: (United Kingdom) Noah Baglin	
FIA Karting World Championship	KZ2: Maksim Orlov	
FIA Karting World Championship	OK-N: (Italy) Manuel Scognamiglio	
FIA Karting World Championship	KZ2-M: (Italy) Angelo Lombardo	
FIA Karting World Championship	OKN-J: (Italy) Gioele Girardello	
FIA Karting European Championship	OK: (Spain) Christian Costoya	
FIA Karting European Championship	OK-J: (Netherlands) Dean Hoogendoorn	
FIA Karting European Championship	KZ: (France) Mattéo Spirgel	
FIA Karting European Championship	KZ2: Maksim Orlov	
FIA Karting European Championship	KZ2-M: (Italy) Antonio Piccioni	
FIA Karting Academy Trophy	Senior: (Japan) Yuzuki Sato	
FIA Karting Academy Trophy	Junior: (Finland) Oiva Vettenranta	
FIA Karting Arrive and Drive World Cup	Senior: (New Zealand) Zach Tucker	
FIA Karting Arrive and Drive World Cup	Junior: (United States) Troy Ferguson	
WSK Euro Series	OK: (Spain) Christian Costoya	
WSK Euro Series	OK-J: (Turkey) Iskender Zulfikari	
WSK Euro Series	OK-N: (Italy) Manuel Scognamiglio	
WSK Euro Series	OKN-J: (China) Huifei Xie	
WSK Euro Series	Mini Gr3: (Sweden) Elton Hedfors	
WSK Euro Series	Mini U10: (Netherlands) Wynn Godschalk	
WSK Super Master Series	KZ2: (Netherlands) Senna Van Walstijn	
WSK Super Master Series	OK: (Belgium) Dries Van Langendonck	
WSK Super Master Series	OKN-J: (United States) Lucas Palacio	
WSK Super Master Series	Mini Gr3: (Italy) Niccolò Perico	
WSK Super Master Series	Mini U10: (United States) Josh Bergman	
Champions of the Future	KZ2: Maksim Orlov	
Champions of the Future	KZ2-Masters: (Italy) Angelo Lombardo	
Champions of the Future	KZ: (Netherlands) Senna Van Walstijn	
Champions of the Future	OK: (United Kingdom) Kenzo Craigie	
Champions of the Future	OK-J: (United Kingdom) Noah Baglin	
Champions of the Future	OK-N: (Lithuania) Markas Silkunas	
Champions of the Future	OKN-J: (United Arab Emirates) Conor Clancy	
Champions of the Future	60 Mini: (Italy) Niccolò Perico	
Champions of the Future	Mini U10: (United States) Wynn Godschalk	
IAME Euro Series	X30 Senior: (Spain) Aaron Garcia Lopez	
IAME Euro Series	X30 Junior: (United Kingdom) Riley Cranham	
IAME Euro Series	X30 Mini: (United Kingdom) George House	
Italian Karting Championship	OK: (Italy) Manuel Scognamiglio	
Italian Karting Championship	OKJ: (Italy) Gioele Girardello	
Italian Karting Championship	KZ2: (Italy) Riccardo Longhi	
Italian Karting Championship	KZ2 Under-18: (Finland) Kimi Tani	
Italian Karting Championship	KZ2 Master-35: (Italy) Angelo Lombardo	
Italian Karting Championship	Mini Gr.3: (United Kingdom) Mason Robertson	
Italian Karting Championship	Mini U10: (Ukraine) Platon Kovtunenko	
Rotax Max Challenge	DD2: (Netherlands) Sem Knopjes	
Rotax Max Challenge	DD2-Masters: (Lithuania) Martynas Tankevicius	
Rotax Max Challenge	E20-Senior: (Germany) Jannik Jakobs	
Rotax Max Challenge	E20-Masters: (Netherlands) Maurits Knopjes	
Rotax Max Challenge	Senior MAX: (United Kingdom) Macauley Bishop	
Rotax Max Challenge	Junior MAX: (Lithuania) Majus Mazinas	
Rotax Max Challenge	Micro: (United Arab Emirates) Benjamin Karajkovic	
Rotax Max Challenge	Mini: (United Kingdom) Tom Read	
Rotax Max Challenge	Nations Cup: United Kingdom	

== Motorcycle racing ==
Series	Champion	Refer
FIM MotoGP World Championship	(Spain) Marc Márquez	2025 MotoGP World Championship
FIM MotoGP World Championship	Teams: (Italy) Ducati Lenovo Team	2025 MotoGP World Championship
FIM MotoGP World Championship	Constructors: (Italy) Ducati	2025 MotoGP World Championship
FIM Moto2 World Championship	(Brazil) Diogo Moreira	2025 Moto2 World Championship
FIM Moto2 World Championship	Teams: (Italy) Fantic Racing	2025 Moto2 World Championship
FIM Moto2 World Championship	Constructors: (Germany) Kalex	2025 Moto2 World Championship
FIM Moto3 World Championship	(Spain) José Antonio Rueda	2025 Moto3 World Championship
FIM Moto3 World Championship	Teams: (Finland) Red Bull KTM Ajo	2025 Moto3 World Championship
FIM Moto3 World Championship	Constructors: (Austria) KTM	2025 Moto3 World Championship
FIM MotoE World Championship	(Italy) Alessandro Zaccone	2025 MotoE World Championship
FIM MotoE World Championship	Teams: (Monaco) LCR E-Team	2025 MotoE World Championship
Red Bull MotoGP Rookies Cup	(Spain) Brian Uriarte	2025 Red Bull MotoGP Rookies Cup
FIM JuniorGP World Championship	(Spain) Brian Uriarte	2025 FIM JuniorGP World Championship
FIM Moto2 European Championship	(Poland) Milan Pawelec	2025 FIM Moto2 European Championship
FIM Stock European Championship	(Spain) Iker García	2025 FIM Stock European Championship
FIM Women's Circuit Racing World Championship	(Spain) María Herrera	2025 FIM Women's Circuit Racing World Championship
All Japan Road Race Championship	JSB1000: (Japan) Katsuyuki Nakasuga	2025 All Japan Road Race Championship
All Japan Road Race Championship	ST1000: (Japan) Taiga Hada	2025 All Japan Road Race Championship
All Japan Road Race Championship	ST600: (Japan) Yuta Date	2025 All Japan Road Race Championship
All Japan Road Race Championship	J-GP3: (Japan) Hiroki Ono	2025 All Japan Road Race Championship
Asia Road Racing Championship	Asia Superbike 1000: (Malaysia) Hafizh Syahrin	2025 Asia Road Racing Championship
Asia Road Racing Championship	Asia Supersport 600: (Malaysia) Kasma Daniel	2025 Asia Road Racing Championship
Asia Road Racing Championship	Asia Production 250: (Indonesia) Fadillah Arbi Aditama	2025 Asia Road Racing Championship
Asia Road Racing Championship	Underbone 150: (Indonesia) Husni Fuadzy	2025 Asia Road Racing Championship
Asia Road Racing Championship	TVS Asia One Make Championship: (Japan) Hiroki Ono	2025 Asia Road Racing Championship
Asia Talent Cup	(Japan) Ryota Ogiwara	2025 Asia Talent Cup
British Superbike Championship	(United Kingdom) Kyle Ryde	2025 British Superbike Championship
British Superbike Championship	Teams: (United Kingdom) Nitrous Competitions Racing Yamaha	2025 British Superbike Championship
Canadian Superbike Championship	(United Kingdom) Ben Young	2025 Canadian Superbike Championship
Canadian Superbike Championship	Constructors: (Germany) BMW	2025 Canadian Superbike Championship
European Talent Cup	(Spain) Fernando Bujosa	2025 European Talent Cup
MotoAmerica Superbike Championship	(United States) Cameron Beaubier	2025 MotoAmerica Superbike Championship
MotoAmerica Superbike Championship	Superbike Cup: (United States) J. D. Beach	2025 MotoAmerica Superbike Championship
MotoAmerica Supersport Championship	(South Africa) Mathew Scholtz	2025 MotoAmerica Supersport Championship
MotoAmerica Superstock 1000 Championship	(United States) Andrew Lee	2025 MotoAmerica Superstock 1000 Championship
Superbike World Championship	(Turkey) Toprak Razgatlıoğlu	2025 Superbike World Championship
Superbike World Championship	Teams: (Italy) Ducati Corse	2025 Superbike World Championship
Superbike World Championship	Constructors: (Italy) Ducati	2025 Superbike World Championship
Supersport World Championship	(Italy) Stefano Manzi	2025 Supersport World Championship
Supersport World Championship	Teams: (Italy) Yamaha bLU cRU EvanBros Racing	2025 Supersport World Championship
Supersport World Championship	Constructors: (Japan) Yamaha	2025 Supersport World Championship
Supersport 300 World Championship	(Spain) Beñat Fernández	2025 Supersport 300 World Championship
Supersport 300 World Championship	Teams: (Italy) Team ProDina XCI	2025 Supersport 300 World Championship
Supersport 300 World Championship	Constructors: (Japan) Kawasaki	2025 Supersport 300 World Championship

=== Motocross ===
Series	Champion	Refer
FIM Motocross World Championship	MX1: (France) Romain Febvre	2025 FIM Motocross World Championship
FIM Motocross World Championship	MX1 Manufacturers: (Austria) KTM	2025 FIM Motocross World Championship
FIM Motocross World Championship	MX2: (Germany) Simon Längenfelder	2025 FIM Motocross World Championship
FIM Motocross World Championship	MX2 Manufacturers: (Austria) KTM	2025 FIM Motocross World Championship
FIM Women's Motocross World Championship	(Netherlands) Lotte van Drunen	2025 FIM Women's Motocross World Championship
FIM Women's Motocross World Championship	Manufacturers: (Spain) Gas Gas	2025 FIM Women's Motocross World Championship
FIM Enduro World Championship	(Spain) Josep García	2025 FIM Enduro World Championship
FIM Enduro World Championship	Enduro 1: (Spain) Josep García	2025 FIM Enduro World Championship
FIM Enduro World Championship	Enduro 2: (Italy) Andrea Verona	2025 FIM Enduro World Championship
FIM Enduro World Championship	Enduro 3: (New Zealand) Hamish MacDonald	2025 FIM Enduro World Championship
FIM Enduro World Championship	Junior: (Sweden) Axel Semb	2025 FIM Enduro World Championship
FIM Enduro World Championship	Junior 1: (France) Leo Joyon	2025 FIM Enduro World Championship
FIM Enduro World Championship	Junior 2: (Sweden) Axel Semb	2025 FIM Enduro World Championship
FIM Enduro World Championship	Youth: (France) Romain Dagna	2025 FIM Enduro World Championship
FIM Enduro World Championship	Women: (United States) Rachel Gutish	2025 FIM Enduro World Championship
FIM Enduro World Championship	Women Junior: (France) Lorna Lafont	2025 FIM Enduro World Championship
FIM Enduro World Championship	Open 2-stroke: (Hungary) Roland Liszka	2025 FIM Enduro World Championship
FIM Enduro World Championship	Open 4-stroke: (Brazil) Patrik Capila	2025 FIM Enduro World Championship
FIM Sand Races World Championship	(United Kingdom) Todd Kellett	2025 FIM Sand Races World Championship
FIM Sand Races World Championship	Women: (Belgium) Amandine Verstappen	2025 FIM Sand Races World Championship
FIM Sand Races World Championship	Veteran: (Uruguay) Fernando Rubio	2025 FIM Sand Races World Championship
FIM Sand Races World Championship	Junior: (France) Matheo Gerat	2025 FIM Sand Races World Championship
FIM Sand Races World Championship	Vintage: (France) Freddy Seguin	2025 FIM Sand Races World Championship
FIM Sand Races World Championship	Quad: (France) Pablo Violet	2025 FIM Sand Races World Championship
FIM Sand Races World Championship	Quad Vintage: (France) Benoît Sebert	2025 FIM Sand Races World Championship
FIM Sidecarcross World Championship	(Netherlands) Koen Hermans (Netherlands) Ben van den Bogaart	2025 Sidecar Motocross World Championship
FIM Sidecarcross World Championship	Manufacturers: (Netherlands) WSP	2025 Sidecar Motocross World Championship
FIM Supercross World Championship	(United States) Jason Anderson	2025 FIM Supercross World Championship
FIM Supercross World Championship	Teams: (Australia) Quadlock Honda	2025 FIM Supercross World Championship
FIM Supercross World Championship	SX2: (United Kingdom) Max Anstie	2025 FIM Supercross World Championship
ADAC MX Masters	Masters: (Netherlands) Roan van de Moosdijk	2025 ADAC MX Masters
ADAC MX Masters	Youngster Cup: (Denmark) Mads Fredsøe	2025 ADAC MX Masters
AMA Motocross Championship	450cc: (Australia) Jett Lawrence	2025 AMA National Motocross Championship
AMA Motocross Championship	250cc: (United States) Haiden Deegan	2025 AMA National Motocross Championship
AMA Supercross Championship	450 SX: (United States) Cooper Webb	2025 AMA Supercross Championship
AMA Supercross Championship	250 SX West: (United States) Haiden Deegan	2025 AMA Supercross Championship
AMA Supercross Championship	250 SX East: (France) Tom Vialle	2025 AMA Supercross Championship
British Motocross Championship	MX1: (United Kingdom) Conrad Mewse	2025 British Motocross Championship
British Motocross Championship	MX2: (United Kingdom) Tommy Searle	2025 British Motocross Championship
Dutch Masters of Motocross	500cc: (France) Romain Febvre	2025 Dutch Masters of Motocross
Dutch Masters of Motocross	250cc: (Netherlands) Cas Valk	2025 Dutch Masters of Motocross
European Motocross Championship	EMX250: (Latvia) Jānis Reišulis	2025 European Motocross Championship
European Motocross Championship	EMX250 Manufacturers: (Japan) Yamaha	2025 European Motocross Championship
European Motocross Championship	EMX125: (Italy) Nicolò Alvisi	2025 European Motocross Championship
European Motocross Championship	EMX125 Manufacturers: (Austria) KTM	2025 European Motocross Championship
European Motocross Championship	EMXOpen: (Belgium) Cedric Grobben	2025 European Motocross Championship
European Motocross Championship	EMXOpen Manufacturers: (Spain) Gas Gas	2025 European Motocross Championship
European Motocross Championship	EMX2T: (Czech Republic) Václav Kovář	2025 European Motocross Championship
European Motocross Championship	EMX2T Manufacturers: (Austria) KTM	2025 European Motocross Championship
European Motocross Championship	EMX85: (France) Enzo Herzogenrath	2025 European Motocross Championship
European Motocross Championship	EMX85 Manufacturers: (Austria) KTM	2025 European Motocross Championship
European Motocross Championship	EMX65: (France) Mathys Agullo	2025 European Motocross Championship
European Motocross Championship	EMX65 Manufacturers: (Austria) KTM	2025 European Motocross Championship
French Elite Motocross Championship	Elite MX1: (Norway) Kevin Horgmo	2025 French Elite Motocross Championship
French Elite Motocross Championship	Elite MX2: (France) Mathys Boisramé	2025 French Elite Motocross Championship
Indian Supercross Racing League	Teams: (India) BigRock Motorsports SX	2025 Indian Supercross Racing League
Indian Supercross Racing League	450cc: (Australia) Matt Moss	2025 Indian Supercross Racing League
Indian Supercross Racing League	250cc: (France) Calvin Fonvieille	2025 Indian Supercross Racing League
Indian Supercross Racing League	250cc India & Asia: (Indonesia) Delvintor Alfarizi	2025 Indian Supercross Racing League
Italian Prestige Motocross Championship	MX1: (Sweden) Isak Gifting	2025 Italian Prestige Motocross Championship
Italian Prestige Motocross Championship	MX2: (Italy) Valerio Lata	2025 Italian Prestige Motocross Championship
New Zealand Motocross Championship	MX1: (New Zealand) Maximus Purvis	2025 New Zealand Motocross Championship
New Zealand Motocross Championship	MX2: (New Zealand) Madoc Dixon	2025 New Zealand Motocross Championship
ProMX	MX1: (Australia) Kyle Webster	2025 ProMX Championship
ProMX	MX2: (New Zealand) Brodie Connolly	2025 ProMX Championship
Spanish Motocross Championship	Elite-MX1: (Spain) José Butrón	2025 Spanish Motocross Championship
Spanish Motocross Championship	Elite-MX2: (Spain) Adrià Monné	2025 Spanish Motocross Championship

=== Rally raid ===
Series	Champion	Refer
FIM Bajas World Cup	Motorbikes: (United Arab Emirates) Mohammed Al-Balooshi	2025 FIM Bajas World Cup
FIM Bajas World Cup	Quads: (Saudi Arabia) Hani Al-Noumesi	2025 FIM Bajas World Cup
FIM Bajas World Cup	Women: (Israel) Alona Ben Natan	2025 FIM Bajas World Cup
FIM Bajas World Cup	Junior: (Poland) Konrad Dąbrowski	2025 FIM Bajas World Cup
FIM Bajas World Cup	Veteran: (United Arab Emirates) Mohammed Al-Balooshi	2025 FIM Bajas World Cup
FIM Bajas World Cup	Trail: (Italy) Alessandro Ruoso	2025 FIM Bajas World Cup
FIM World Rally-Raid Championship	(Australia) Daniel Sanders	2025 World Rally-Raid Championship
FIM World Rally-Raid Championship	Manufacturers: (Austria) KTM	2025 World Rally-Raid Championship
FIM World Rally-Raid Championship	Rally2: (Spain) Edgar Canet	2025 World Rally-Raid Championship
FIM World Rally-Raid Championship	Rally2 Teams: (Netherlands) BAS World KTM Team	2025 World Rally-Raid Championship
FIM World Rally-Raid Championship	Rally2 Junior: (Spain) Edgar Canet	2025 World Rally-Raid Championship
FIM World Rally-Raid Championship	Rally3: (France) Thomas Zoldos	2025 World Rally-Raid Championship
FIM World Rally-Raid Championship	Quad: (France) Gaëtan Martinez	2025 World Rally-Raid Championship
FIM World Rally-Raid Championship	Women: (Spain) Sandra Gómez	2025 World Rally-Raid Championship
FIM World Rally-Raid Championship	Senior: (Czech Republic) David Pabiska	2025 World Rally-Raid Championship

=== Speedway ===
Series	Champion	Refer
FIM Long Track World Championship	(United Kingdom) Zach Wajtknecht	2025 FIM Long Track World Championship
FIM Long Track of Nations	(United Kingdom) Great Britain (Wajtknecht / Harris / Appleton)	2025 FIM Long Track of Nations
AMA National Speedway Championship	(United States) Broc Nicol	2025 AMA National Speedway Championship
Australian Individual Speedway Championship	(Australia) Brady Kurtz	2025 Australian Individual Speedway Championship
European Pairs Speedway Championship	Denmark (Madsen / Lyager)	2025 European Pairs Speedway Championship
European Team Speedway Championship	Poland (Zmarzlik / Dudek / Pawlicki / Pawlicki / Przyjemski)	2025 European Team Speedway Championship
European Under-19 Individual Speedway Championship	(Poland) Bartosz Jaworski	2025 European Under-19 Individual Speedway Championship
SGP2	(Ukraine) Nazar Parnitskyi	2025 SGP2
Speedway European Championship	(Poland) Patryk Dudek	2025 Speedway European Championship
Speedway Grand Prix	(Poland) Bartosz Zmarzlik	2025 Speedway Grand Prix

== Open wheel racing ==
Series	Champion	Refer
FIA Formula One World Championship	(United Kingdom) Lando Norris	2025 Formula One World Championship
FIA Formula One World Championship	Constructors: (United Kingdom) McLaren-Mercedes	2025 Formula One World Championship
FIA Formula 2 Championship	(Italy) Leonardo Fornaroli	2025 Formula 2 Championship
FIA Formula 2 Championship	Teams: (United Kingdom) Invicta Racing	2025 Formula 2 Championship
FIA Formula E World Championship	(United Kingdom) Oliver Rowland	2024–25 Formula E World Championship
FIA Formula E World Championship	Teams: (Germany) Porsche Formula E Team	2024–25 Formula E World Championship
FIA Formula E World Championship	Manufacturers: (Germany) Porsche	2024–25 Formula E World Championship
Super Formula Championship	(Japan) Ayumu Iwasa	2025 Super Formula Championship
Super Formula Championship	Teams: (Japan) Docomo Team Dandelion Racing	2025 Super Formula Championship
Super Formula Championship	Rookies: (Brazil) Igor Omura Fraga	2025 Super Formula Championship
IndyCar Series	(Spain) Álex Palou	2025 IndyCar Series
IndyCar Series	Manufacturers: (Japan) Honda	2025 IndyCar Series
IndyCar Series	Rookies: (United Kingdom) Louis Foster	2025 IndyCar Series
Indy NXT	(Norway) Dennis Hauger	2025 Indy NXT
Indy NXT	Teams: (United States) Andretti Global	2025 Indy NXT
Indy NXT	Rookies: (Norway) Dennis Hauger	2025 Indy NXT
USF Pro 2000 Championship	(United States) Max Garcia	2025 USF Pro 2000 Championship
USF Pro 2000 Championship	Teams: (United States) Pabst Racing	2025 USF Pro 2000 Championship
USF2000 Championship	(United States) Jack Jeffers	2025 USF2000 Championship
USF2000 Championship	Teams: (United States) VRD Racing	2025 USF2000 Championship
USF Juniors	(Brazil) Leonardo Escorpioni	2025 USF Juniors
USF Juniors	Teams: (United States) Zanella Racing	2025 USF Juniors
Atlantic Championship Series	016 Class: (United States) John McAleer	2025 Atlantic Championship
Atlantic Championship Series	Open Class: (United States) Brandon Schwarz	2025 Atlantic Championship
Atlantic Championship Series	USF Juniors Class: (Canada) Justin Di Lucia	2025 Atlantic Championship
Australian Drivers' Championship	(Australia) Damon Sterling	2025 Australian Drivers' Championship
Australian Drivers' Championship	Masters: (Australia) Hamish Leighton	2025 Australian Drivers' Championship
Australian Formula Ford Championship	(Australia) Kobi Williams	2025 Australian Formula Ford Championship
Australian Formula Open	(Australia) Michael Doherty	2025 Australian Formula Open
F1600 Championship Series	(United States) Ayrton Cahan	2025 F1600 Championship Series
F2000 Italian Formula Trophy	(Switzerland) Sandro Zeller	2025 F2000 Italian Formula Trophy
Fórmula 2 Argentina	(Argentina) Valentino Alaux	2025 Fórmula 2 Argentina
Formula Car Challenge	(United States) Christian Okpysh	2025 Formula Car Challenge
Fórmula Nacional Argentina	(Argentina) Julián Ramos	2025 Fórmula Nacional Argentina
Fórmula Nacional Argentina	Teams: (Argentina) MG Ramini	2025 Fórmula Nacional Argentina
Formula Nordic	(Sweden) Melvin Kalousdian	2025 Formula Nordic
Formula Pro USA Western Championship	FPUSA-3: (United States) Larry Schnur	2025 Formula Pro USA Western Championship
Formula Pro USA Western Championship	FPUSA-4: (United States) Ridgeley Welsh	2025 Formula Pro USA Western Championship
New Zealand Formula Ford Championship	(New Zealand) Blake Dowdall	2024-25 New Zealand Formula Ford Championship
Formula 3 / Formula Regional
FIA Formula 3 Championship	(Brazil) Rafael Câmara	2025 FIA Formula 3 Championship
FIA Formula 3 Championship	Teams: (Spain) Campos Racing	2025 FIA Formula 3 Championship
Formula Regional Americas Championship	(United States) Titus Sherlock	2025 Formula Regional Americas Championship
Formula Regional Americas Championship	Teams: (United States) Kiwi Motorsport	2025 Formula Regional Americas Championship
Formula Regional Americas Championship	Rookies: (Brazil) Bruno Ribeiro	2025 Formula Regional Americas Championship
Formula Regional Americas Championship	Masters: (United States) Anthony Autiello	2025 Formula Regional Americas Championship
Formula Regional European Championship	(United Kingdom) Freddie Slater	2025 Formula Regional European Championship
Formula Regional European Championship	Teams: (France) R-ace GP	2025 Formula Regional European Championship
Formula Regional European Championship	Rookies: (India) Dion Gowda	2025 Formula Regional European Championship
Formula Regional Japanese Championship	(Japan) Kiyoshi Umegaki	2025 Formula Regional Japanese Championship
Formula Regional Japanese Championship	Teams: (Japan) TOM'S Formula	2025 Formula Regional Japanese Championship
Formula Regional Japanese Championship	Masters: (Japan) Yutaka Toriba	2025 Formula Regional Japanese Championship
Formula Regional Middle East Championship	(France) Evan Giltaire	2025 Formula Regional Middle East Championship
Formula Regional Middle East Championship	Teams: (India) Mumbai Falcons Racing Limited	2025 Formula Regional Middle East Championship
Formula Regional Middle East Championship	Rookies: (United Kingdom) Freddie Slater	2025 Formula Regional Middle East Championship
Formula Regional Oceania Championship	(United Kingdom) Arvid Lindblad	2025 Formula Regional Oceania Championship
Formula Regional Oceania Championship	Teams: (New Zealand) M2 Competition	2025 Formula Regional Oceania Championship
Formula Regional Oceania Championship	Rookies: (New Zealand) Zack Scoular	2025 Formula Regional Oceania Championship
Formula Regional Oceania Championship	Tasman Cup: (New Zealand) Zack Scoular	2025 Formula Regional Oceania Championship
Drexler-Automotive Formula Cup	Formula 3 Cup: (Switzerland) Sandro Zeller	2025 Drexler-Automotive Formula Cup
Drexler-Automotive Formula Cup	Formula 3 Trophy: (Germany) André Petropoulos	2025 Drexler-Automotive Formula Cup
Drexler-Automotive Formula Cup	Formula Regional: (France) Jérémy Clavaud	2025 Drexler-Automotive Formula Cup
Drexler-Automotive Formula Cup	Formula Light Cup: (Austria) Michael Fischer	2025 Drexler-Automotive Formula Cup
Eurocup-3	(Italy) Mattia Colnaghi	2025 Eurocup-3 season
Eurocup-3	Teams: (Netherlands) MP Motorsport	2025 Eurocup-3 season
Eurocup-3	Rookies: (Italy) Mattia Colnaghi	2025 Eurocup-3 season
Eurocup-3 Winter Series	(Poland) Maciej Gładysz	2025 Eurocup-3 season
Eurocup-3 Winter Series	Teams: (Netherlands) MP Motorsport	2025 Eurocup-3 season
Euroformula Open Championship	(Poland) Tymek Kucharczyk	2025 Euroformula Open Championship
Euroformula Open Championship	Teams: (Germany) Team Motopark	2025 Euroformula Open Championship
Euroformula Open Championship	Rookies: (Sri Lanka) Yevan David	2025 Euroformula Open Championship
GB3 Championship	(Australia) Alex Ninovic	2025 GB3 Championship
GB3 Championship	Teams: (New Zealand) Rodin Motorsport	2025 GB3 Championship
Super Formula Lights	(Japan) Yuto Nomura	2025 Super Formula Lights
Super Formula Lights	Teams: (Japan) B-Max Racing Team	2025 Super Formula Lights
Super Formula Lights	Masters: (Japan) Yasuhiro Shimizu	2025 Super Formula Lights
Ultimate Cup European Series	(Argentina) Nano López	Ultimate Cup European Series
Ultimate Cup European Series	Rookies: (Argentina) Nano López	Ultimate Cup European Series
Ultimate Cup European Series	Gentlemen: (Switzerland) Laurent Wuthrich	Ultimate Cup European Series
Formula 4
F1 Academy	(France) Doriane Pin	2025 F1 Academy season
F1 Academy	Teams: (Italy) Prema Racing	2025 F1 Academy season
F4 Brazilian Championship	(Brazil) Heitor Dall'Agnol	2025 F4 Brazilian Championship
F4 Brazilian Championship	Teams: (Brazil) TMG Racing	2025 F4 Brazilian Championship
F4 Brazilian Championship	Rookies: (Brazil) Heitor Dall'Agnol	2025 F4 Brazilian Championship
F4 British Championship	(Republic of Ireland) Fionn McLaughlin	2025 F4 British Championship
F4 British Championship	Teams: (New Zealand) Rodin Motorsport	2025 F4 British Championship
F4 British Championship	Rookies: (Republic of Ireland) Fionn McLaughlin	2025 F4 British Championship
F4 British Championship	Challenge: (India) Ary Bansal	2025 F4 British Championship
Formula 4 CEZ Championship	(Argentina) Gino Trappa	2025 Formula 4 CEZ Championship
Formula 4 CEZ Championship	Teams: (Switzerland) Jenzer Motorsport	2025 Formula 4 CEZ Championship
F4 Chinese Championship	(Hong Kong) Shimo Zhang	2025 F4 Chinese Championship
F4 Chinese Championship	Teams: (China) Yinqiao ACM Geeke Racing	2025 F4 Chinese Championship
French F4 Championship	(France) Alexandre Munoz	2025 French F4 Championship
F4 Indian Championship	(Kenya) Shane Chandaria	2025 F4 Indian Championship
Italian F4 Championship	(Japan) Kean Nakamura-Berta	2025 Italian F4 Championship
Italian F4 Championship	Teams: (Italy) Prema Racing	2025 Italian F4 Championship
Italian F4 Championship	Rookies: (Colombia) Salim Hanna	2025 Italian F4 Championship
Italian F4 Championship	Women: (United Kingdom) Emily Cotty	2025 Italian F4 Championship
F4 Japanese Championship	(Japan) Tokiya Suzuki	2025 F4 Japanese Championship
F4 Japanese Championship	Teams: (Japan) HYDRANGEA Kageyama Racing	2025 F4 Japanese Championship
F4 Japanese Championship	Independent: (Japan) Nobuhiro Imada	2025 F4 Japanese Championship
F4 Japanese Championship	Independent Teams: (Japan) B-Max Racing Team	2025 F4 Japanese Championship
F4 Middle East Championship	(Italy) Emanuele Olivieri	2025 F4 Middle East Championship
F4 Middle East Championship	Teams: (France) R-ace GP	2025 F4 Middle East Championship
F4 Middle East Championship	Rookies: (Colombia) Salim Hanna	2025 F4 Middle East Championship
NACAM Formula 4 Championship	(Mexico) Zaky Ibrahim	2025 NACAM Formula 4 Championship
NACAM Formula 4 Championship	Teams: (Mexico) Alessandros Silver	2025 NACAM Formula 4 Championship
NACAM Formula 4 Championship	Nations Cup: Mexico	2025 NACAM Formula 4 Championship
F4 Saudi Arabian Championship	(United Kingdom) Kit Belofsky	2025 F4 Saudi Arabian Championship
F4 Saudi Arabian Championship	Rookies: (United Kingdom) Kit Belofsky	2025 F4 Saudi Arabian Championship
Formula 4 South East Asia Championship	(Vietnam) Alex Sawer	2025 Formula 4 South East Asia Championship
Formula 4 South East Asia Championship	Teams: (Australia) Evans GP	2025 Formula 4 South East Asia Championship
Formula 4 South East Asia Championship	Rookies: (Philippines) Iñigo Anton	2025 Formula 4 South East Asia Championship
F4 Spanish Championship	(Belgium) Thomas Strauven	2025 F4 Spanish Championship
F4 Spanish Championship	Teams: (Spain) Griffin Core by Campos Racing	2025 F4 Spanish Championship
Formula 4 United States Championship	(United States) Cooper Shipman	2025 Formula 4 United States Championship
Formula 4 United States Championship	Teams: (United States) Kiwi Motorsport	2025 Formula 4 United States Championship
AU4 Australian Championship	Gen 2: (Australia) Noah Killion	2025 AU4 Australian Championship
AU4 Australian Championship	Gen 1: (Australia) Jensen Marold	2025 AU4 Australian Championship
E4 Championship	(Japan) Kean Nakamura-Berta	2025 E4 Championship
E4 Championship	Teams: (Italy) Prema Racing	2025 E4 Championship
E4 Championship	Rookies: (Ukraine) Oleksandr Bondarev	2025 E4 Championship
E4 Championship	Women: (United Kingdom) Emily Cotty	2025 E4 Championship
Eurocup-4 Spanish Winter Series	(Belgium) Thomas Strauven	2025 F4 Spanish Championship
Eurocup-4 Spanish Winter Series	Teams: (Spain) Griffin Core by Campos Racing	2025 F4 Spanish Championship
Formula Trophy	(Turkey) Alp Aksoy	2025 Formula Trophy
Formula Trophy	Rookies: (Turkey) Alp Aksoy	2025 Formula Trophy
Formula Winter Series	(Brazil) Gabriel Gomez	2025 Formula Winter Series
Formula Winter Series	Teams: (Germany) US Racing	2025 Formula Winter Series
Formula Winter Series	Rookies: (Republic of Ireland) Fionn McLaughlin	2025 Formula Winter Series
GB4 Championship	(India) Ary Bansal	2025 GB4 Championship
GB4 Championship	Teams: (United Kingdom) Elite Motorsport	2025 GB4 Championship
Kyojo Cup	(Japan) Rio Shimono	2025 Kyojo Cup season
Ligier Junior Formula Championship	(Uruguay) Gastón Irazú	2025 Ligier Junior Formula Championship
Ligier Junior Formula Championship	Teams: (United States) Champagne Racing	2025 Ligier Junior Formula Championship
Nordic 4 Championship	Danish: (Denmark) Sebastian Bach	2025 Nordic 4 Championship
Nordic 4 Championship	Nordic: (Denmark) Marius Kristiansen	2025 Nordic 4 Championship

== Powerboat racing ==
Series	Champion	Refer
F1H2O UIM World Championship	(United States) Shaun Torrente	2025 F1H2O UIM World Championship
F1H2O UIM World Championship	Teams: (United Arab Emirates) Victory Team	2025 F1H2O UIM World Championship
F1H2O UIM World Championship	Pole Position Trophy: (Sweden) Jonas Andersson	2025 F1H2O UIM World Championship
UIM E1 World Championship	(Finland) Emma Kimiläinen (United Kingdom) Sam Coleman	2025 E1 Series Championship
UIM E1 World Championship	Teams: (United States) Team Brady	2025 E1 Series Championship

== Rallying ==
Series	Champion	Refer
FIA World Rally Championship	(France) Sébastien Ogier	2025 World Rally Championship
FIA World Rally Championship	Co-Drivers: (France) Vincent Landais	2025 World Rally Championship
FIA World Rally Championship	Manufacturers: (Japan) Toyota Gazoo Racing WRT	2025 World Rally Championship
FIA WRC2 Championship	(Sweden) Oliver Solberg	2025 WRC2 Championship
FIA WRC2 Championship	Co-Drivers: (United Kingdom) Elliott Edmondson	2025 WRC2 Championship
FIA WRC2 Championship	Teams: (Germany) Toksport WRT	2025 WRC2 Championship
FIA WRC2 Championship	Challenger: (Bulgaria) Nikolay Gryazin	2025 WRC2 Championship
FIA WRC2 Championship	Challenger Co-Drivers: (Kyrgyzstan) Konstantin Aleksandrov	2025 WRC2 Championship
FIA WRC3 Championship	(Italy) Matteo Fontana	2025 WRC3 Championship
FIA WRC3 Championship	Co-Drivers: (Italy) Alessandro Arnaboldi	2025 WRC3 Championship
Junior WRC Championship	(Sweden) Mille Johansson	2025 Junior WRC Championship
Junior WRC Championship	Co-Drivers: (Sweden) Johan Grönvall	2025 Junior WRC Championship
African Rally Championship	(Tanzania) Yasin Nasser	
African Rally Championship	Co-Drivers: (Uganda) Ali Katumba	
American Rally Association Championship	(Canada) Brandon Semenuk	
American Rally Association Championship	Co-Drivers: (United Kingdom) Keaton Williams	
Asia-Pacific Rally Championship	(Japan) Hiroki Arai	
Asia-Pacific Rally Championship	Co-Drivers: (Japan) Hiroki Tachikui	
Australian Rally Championship	(New Zealand) Hayden Paddon	
Australian Rally Championship	Co-Drivers: (New Zealand) John Kennard	
Austrian Rally Championship	(Austria) Simon Wagner	
Austrian Rally Championship	Co-Drivers: (Austria) Hanna Ostlender	
British Rally Championship	(United Kingdom) William Creighton	2025 British Rally Championship
British Rally Championship	Co-Drivers: (United Kingdom) Liam Regan	2025 British Rally Championship
Canadian Rally Championship	(Mexico) Ricardo Cordero	
Canadian Rally Championship	Co-Drivers: (Mexico) Marco Hernandez	
Croatian Rally Championship	(Italy) Matteo Bernini	
Croatian Rally Championship	Co-Drivers: (Italy) Lorenzo Mattucci	
Czech Rally Championship	(Czech Republic) Jan Kopecký	
Czech Rally Championship	Co-Drivers: (Czech Republic) Jiří Hovorka	
European Rally Championship	(Poland) Mikołaj Marczyk	2025 European Rally Championship
European Rally Championship	Co-Drivers: (Poland) Szymon Gospodarczyk	2025 European Rally Championship
European Rally Championship	Teams: (India) Team MRF Tyres	2025 European Rally Championship
European Rally Championship	Tyre Suppliers: (Italy) Pirelli	2025 European Rally Championship
European Rally Championship	ERC3: (Poland) Tymoteusz Abramowski	2025 European Rally Championship
European Rally Championship	ERC3 Co-Drivers: (Poland) Jakub Wróbel	2025 European Rally Championship
European Rally Championship	ERC4: (Sweden) Calle Carlberg	2025 European Rally Championship
European Rally Championship	ERC4 Co-Drivers: (Norway) Jørgen Eriksen	2025 European Rally Championship
European Rally Championship	Junior ERC: (Sweden) Calle Carlberg	2025 European Rally Championship
European Rally Championship	Junior ERC Co-Drivers: (Norway) Jørgen Eriksen	2025 European Rally Championship
Finnish Rally Championship	(Finland) Esapekka Lappi	
Finnish Rally Championship	Co-Drivers: (Finland) Enni Mälkönen	
Italian Rally Championship	(Italy) Giandomenico Basso	
Italian Rally Championship	Co-Drivers: (Italy) Lorenzo Granai	
Italian Rally Championship	Manufacturers: (Czech Republic) Škoda	
Latvian Rally Championship	(Latvia) Ralfs Sirmacis	
Latvian Rally Championship	Co-Drivers: (Latvia) Armands Bite	
New Zealand Rally Championship	(New Zealand) Ben Hunt	
New Zealand Rally Championship	Co-Drivers: (New Zealand) Tony Rawstorn	
Portuguese Rally Championship	(Spain) Dani Sordo	
Portuguese Rally Championship	Co-Drivers: (Spain) Cándido Carrera	
Romanian Rally Championship	(Romania) Simone Tempestini	
Romanian Rally Championship	Co-Drivers: (Romania) Carmen Poenaru	
Scottish Rally Championship	(United Kingdom) David Bogie	2025 Scottish Rally Championship
Scottish Rally Championship	Co-Drivers: (United Kingdom) Michael Hendry	2025 Scottish Rally Championship
Slovak Rally Championship	(Slovakia) Jaroslav Melichárek	
Slovak Rally Championship	Co-Drivers: (Slovakia) Erik Melichárek	

=== Rallycross ===
Series	Champion	Refer
FIA World Rallycross Championship	(Sweden) Johan Kristoffersson	2025 FIA World Rallycross Championship
FIA World Rallycross Championship	Teams: (Sweden) Kristoffersson Motorsport	2025 FIA World Rallycross Championship
FIA European Rallycross Championship	RX1: (Switzerland) Yury Belevskiy	2025 FIA European Rallycross Championship
FIA European Rallycross Championship	RX3: (Portugal) João Ribeiro	2025 FIA European Rallycross Championship

=== Rally raid ===
Series	Champion	Refer
FIA World Rally-Raid Championship	(Brazil) Lucas Moraes	2025 World Rally-Raid Championship
FIA World Rally-Raid Championship	Co-Drivers: (France) Édouard Boulanger	2025 World Rally-Raid Championship
FIA World Rally-Raid Championship	Challenger: (Argentina) Nicolás Cavigliasso	2025 World Rally-Raid Championship
FIA World Rally-Raid Championship	Challenger Co-Drivers: (Argentina) Valentina Pertegarini	2025 World Rally-Raid Championship
FIA World Rally-Raid Championship	SSV: (Portugal) Alexandre Pinto	2025 World Rally-Raid Championship
FIA World Rally-Raid Championship	SSV Co-Drivers: (Portugal) Bernardo Oliveira	2025 World Rally-Raid Championship

== Sports car and GT ==
Series	Champion	Refer
FIA World Endurance Championship	Hypercar: (United Kingdom) James Calado; Hypercar: (Italy) Antonio Giovinazzi; Hypercar: (Italy) Alessandro Pier Guidi	2025 FIA World Endurance Championship
FIA World Endurance Championship	Hypercar Manufacturers: (Italy) Ferrari	2025 FIA World Endurance Championship
FIA World Endurance Championship	Hypercar Teams: (Italy) AF Corse	2025 FIA World Endurance Championship
FIA World Endurance Championship	LMGT3: (United States) Ryan Hardwick; LMGT3: (Austria) Richard Lietz; LMGT3: (Italy) Riccardo Pera	2025 FIA World Endurance Championship
FIA World Endurance Championship	LMGT3 Teams: (Germany) Manthey 1st Phorm	2025 FIA World Endurance Championship
24H Series	GT3: (Austria) Klaus Bachler; GT3: (Germany) Jörg Dreisow; GT3: (Germany) Manuel Lauck	2025 24H Series
24H Series	GT3 Teams: (Germany) No. 73 Proton Huber Competition	2025 24H Series
24H Series	GT3 Pro-Am: (Austria) Klaus Bachler; GT3 Pro-Am: (Germany) Jörg Dreisow; GT3 Pro-Am: (Germany) Manuel Lauck	2025 24H Series
24H Series	GT3 Pro-Am Teams: (Germany) No. 73 Proton Huber Competition	2025 24H Series
24H Series	GT3 Am: (Kyrgyzstan) Andrey Solukovtsev; GT3 Am: (Cyprus) Vasily Vladykin	2025 24H Series
24H Series	GT3 Am Teams: (United Kingdom) No. 69 Continental Racing by Simpson Motorsport	2025 24H Series
24H Series	992: (United States) Tracy Krohn; 992: (Sweden) Niclas Jönsson; 992: (Germany) Philip Hamprecht	2025 24H Series
24H Series	992 Teams: (Germany) No. 907 RPM Racing	2025 24H Series
24H Series	992 Am: (United States) Tracy Krohn; 992 Am: (Sweden) Niclas Jönsson; 992 Am: (Germany) Philip Hamprecht	2025 24H Series
24H Series	992 Am Teams: (Germany) No. 907 RPM Racing	2025 24H Series
24H Series	GTX: (France) Cyril Calmon; GTX: (France) Philippe Bonnel	2025 24H Series
24H Series	GTX Teams: (France) No. 701 Vortex V8	2025 24H Series
24H Series	GT4: (United Kingdom) Matt George; GT4: (United Kingdom) Christopher Jones; GT4: (United Kingdom) Neville Jones	2025 24H Series
24H Series	GT4 Teams: (United Kingdom) No. 421 Venture Engineering	2025 24H Series
ADAC GT Masters	(Germany) Salman Owega (Germany) Finn Wiebelhaus	2025 ADAC GT Masters
ADAC GT Masters	Teams: (Germany) Haupt Racing Team	2025 ADAC GT Masters
ADAC GT Masters	Pro-Am: (Switzerland) Alexander Fach; Pro-Am: (Germany) Alexander Schwarzer	2025 ADAC GT Masters
ADAC GT Masters	Silver: (Germany) Salman Owega; Silver: (Germany) Finn Wiebelhaus	2025 ADAC GT Masters
ADAC GT4 Germany	(Germany) Enrico Förderer (Germany) Jay Mo Härtling	2025 ADAC GT4 Germany
ADAC GT4 Germany	Teams: (Germany) AVIA W&S Motorsport	2025 ADAC GT4 Germany
Asian Le Mans Series	LMP2: (Denmark) Malthe Jakobsen; LMP2: (Denmark) Michael Jensen; LMP2: (Italy) Valerio Rinicella	2024–25 Asian Le Mans Series
Asian Le Mans Series	LMP2 Teams: (Portugal) #25 Algarve Pro Racing	2024–25 Asian Le Mans Series
Asian Le Mans Series	LMP3: (Denmark) Jens Reno Møller; LMP3: (Denmark) Theodor Jensen	2024–25 Asian Le Mans Series
Asian Le Mans Series	LMP3 Teams: (Czech Republic) #26 Bretton Racing	2024–25 Asian Le Mans Series
Asian Le Mans Series	GT: (Hong Kong) Antares Au; GT: (Austria) Klaus Bachler; GT: (Germany) Joel Sturm	2024–25 Asian Le Mans Series
Asian Le Mans Series	GT Teams: (Germany) #10 Manthey Racing	2024–25 Asian Le Mans Series
Aussie Racing Cars	(Australia) Kody Garland	2025 Aussie Racing Car Series
Aussie Racing Cars	Masters: (Australia) Cody McKay	2025 Aussie Racing Car Series
Aussie Racing Cars	Gold: (Australia) Scott Dornan	2025 Aussie Racing Car Series
Aussie Racing Cars	Rookies: (Australia) Caleb Paterson	2025 Aussie Racing Car Series
Australian National Trans-Am Series	(Australia) Todd Hazelwood	2025 Australian National Trans Am Series
Belcar Endurance Championship	(Belgium) #15 D'Ieteren Luxury Performance by NGT	2025 Belcar Endurance Championship
Britcar Endurance Championship	(United Kingdom) Dominic Malone (United Kingdom) Adam Smalley (United Kingdom) Charles Rainford	2025 Britcar Endurance Championship
British GT Championship	GT3: (United Kingdom) Charles Dawson; GT3: (United Kingdom) Kiern Jewiss	2025 British GT Championship
British GT Championship	GT3 Teams: (Bahrain) 2 Seas Motorsport	2025 British GT Championship
British GT Championship	GT3 Pro-Am: (United Kingdom) Charles Dawson; GT3 Pro-Am: (United Kingdom) Kiern Jewiss	2025 British GT Championship
British GT Championship	GT3 Silver: (United Kingdom) Andrew Howard; GT3 Silver: (United Kingdom) Tom Wood	2025 British GT Championship
British GT Championship	GT4: (United Kingdom) Jack Brown; GT4: (United Kingdom) Marc Warren	2025 British GT Championship
British GT Championship	GT4 Teams: (United Kingdom) Optimum Motorsport	2025 British GT Championship
British GT Championship	GT4 Pro-Am: (United Kingdom) Jack Brown; GT4 Pro-Am: (United Kingdom) Marc Warren	2025 British GT Championship
British GT Championship	GT4 Silver: (United Kingdom) Harry George; GT4 Silver: (United Kingdom) Luca Hopkinson	2025 British GT Championship
British GT Championship	GT4 Endurance Cup: (United Kingdom) Ed McDermott; GT4 Endurance Cup: (United Kingdom) Seb Morris	2025 British GT Championship
British GT Championship	GT4 Endurance Cup Teams: (United Kingdom) Team Parker Racing	2025 British GT Championship
Deutsche Tourenwagen Masters	(Turkey) Ayhancan Güven	2025 Deutsche Tourenwagen Masters
Deutsche Tourenwagen Masters	Teams: (Germany) Manthey Racing	2025 Deutsche Tourenwagen Masters
Deutsche Tourenwagen Masters	Manufacturers: (Germany) Mercedes-AMG	2025 Deutsche Tourenwagen Masters
Deutsche Tourenwagen Masters	Rookies: (Netherlands) Morris Schuring	2025 Deutsche Tourenwagen Masters
European Le Mans Series	LMP2: (United Kingdom) Oliver Gray; LMP2: (France) Esteban Masson; LMP2: (France) Charles Milesi	2025 European Le Mans Series
European Le Mans Series	LMP2 Teams: (France) #48 VDS Panis Racing	2025 European Le Mans Series
European Le Mans Series	LMP2 Pro-Am: (United States) Dane Cameron; LMP2 Pro-Am: (Switzerland) Louis Delétraz; LMP2 Pro-Am: (United States) P. J. Hyett	2025 European Le Mans Series
European Le Mans Series	LMP2 Pro-Am Teams: (United States) #99 AO by TF	2025 European Le Mans Series
European Le Mans Series	LMP3: (France) Adrien Closmenil; LMP3: (Denmark) Theodor Jensen; LMP3: (France) Paul Lanchère	2025 European Le Mans Series
European Le Mans Series	LMP3 Teams: (Switzerland) #17 CLX Motorsport	2025 European Le Mans Series
European Le Mans Series	LMGT3: (Angola) Rui Andrade; LMGT3: (Republic of Ireland) Charlie Eastwood; LMGT3: (Japan) Hiroshi Koizumi	2025 European Le Mans Series
European Le Mans Series	LMGT3 Teams: (United Kingdom) #82 TF Sport	2025 European Le Mans Series
French GT4 Cup	Pro-Am: Stanislav Safronov; Pro-Am: Aleksandr Vaintrub	2025 French GT4 Cup
French GT4 Cup	Am: (France) Stéphane Auriacombe; Am: (Belgium) Stéphane Lemeret	2025 French GT4 Cup
French GT4 Cup	Pro-Am Teams: (France) Mirage Racing	2025 French GT4 Cup
French GT4 Cup	Am Teams: (France) CMR	2025 French GT4 Cup
Ginetta Junior Championship	(Netherlands) Rocco Coronel	2025 Ginetta Junior Championship
GR Cup	(Australia) Oliver Wickham	2025 GR Cup
GR86 Championship New Zealand	(New Zealand) Hugo Allan	2024–25 GR86 Championship New Zealand
GT America Series	SRO3: (United States) Justin Rothberg	2025 GT America Series
GT America Series	SRO3 Teams: (United States) Turner Motorsport	2025 GT America Series
GT America Series	GT2: (United States) CJ Moses	2025 GT America Series
GT America Series	GT2 Teams: (United States) GMG Racing	2025 GT America Series
GT America Series	GT4: (United States) Anthony McIntosh	2025 GT America Series
GT America Series	GT4 Teams: (United States) JTR Motorsports Engineering	2025 GT America Series
GT Cup Open Europe	(Guatemala) Ian Rodríguez (Italy) Luca Franca	2025 GT Cup Open Europe
GT Cup Open Europe	Teams: (Italy) Faems Team	2025 GT Cup Open Europe
GT Cup Open Europe	Pro-Am: (Netherlands) Paul Meijer; Pro-Am: (Netherlands) Laura van den Hengel	2025 GT Cup Open Europe
GT Cup Open Europe	Am: (Austria) Dieter Svepes; Am: (Portugal) Leandro Martins	2025 GT Cup Open Europe
GT Winter Series	(Portugal) Rui Águas (Portugal) Cristiano Maciel	2025 GT Winter Series
GT Winter Series	Teams: (Italy) AF Corse	2025 GT Winter Series
GT Winter Series	GT2: (Spain) Alberto de Martin; GT2: (Spain) Manel Lao	2025 GT Winter Series
GT Winter Series	GT3: (Germany) Kenneth Heyer; GT3: (Germany) Moritz Wiskirchen	2025 GT Winter Series
GT Winter Series	GT3 Pro: (Germany) Luca Engstler	2025 GT Winter Series
GT Winter Series	Cup 1: (Portugal) Rui Águas; Cup 1: (Portugal) Cristiano Maciel	2025 GT Winter Series
GT Winter Series	Cup 2: (Sweden) Calle Bergman; Cup 2: (Sweden) Månz Thalin	2025 GT Winter Series
GT Winter Series	Cup 3: (United Kingdom) Ryan James; Cup 3: (United Kingdom) Oliver Webb	2025 GT Winter Series
GT Winter Series	Cup 4: (Serbia) Miloš Pavlović; Cup 4: (Italy) Alessio Ruffini	2025 GT Winter Series
GT Winter Series	Cup 5: (Republic of Ireland) Sean Doyle; Cup 5: (United Kingdom) Darren Howell	2025 GT Winter Series
GT World Challenge America	(United States) Connor De Phillippi (United States) Kenton Koch	2025 GT World Challenge America
GT World Challenge America	Teams: (United States) Random Vandals Racing	2025 GT World Challenge America
GT World Challenge America	Pro-Am: (United States) Robby Foley; Pro-Am: (United States) Justin Rothberg	2025 GT World Challenge America
GT World Challenge America	Pro-Am Teams: (United States) Turner Motorsport	2025 GT World Challenge America
GT World Challenge America	Am: (United States) : Scott Dollahite	2025 GT World Challenge America
GT World Challenge America	Am Teams: (Italy) AF Corse USA	2025 GT World Challenge America
GT World Challenge Asia	(China) Leo Ye Hongli (China) Yuan Bo	2025 GT World Challenge Asia
GT World Challenge Asia	Teams: (China) Origine Motorsport	2025 GT World Challenge Asia
GT World Challenge Asia	Pro-Am: (China) Lu Wei	2025 GT World Challenge Asia
GT World Challenge Asia	Silver Cup: (China) Franky Cheng Congfu; Silver Cup: (China) James Yu Kuai	2025 GT World Challenge Asia
GT World Challenge Asia	Silver-Am Cup: (Netherlands) Maxime Oosten; Silver-Am Cup: (China) Ruan Cunfan	2025 GT World Challenge Asia
GT World Challenge Asia	Am Cup: (Italy) Christian Colombo; Am Cup: (Indonesia) David Tjiptobiantoro	2025 GT World Challenge Asia
GT World Challenge Asia	China Cup: Leo Ye Hongli; China Cup: Yuan Bo	2025 GT World Challenge Asia
GT World Challenge Australia	Pro-Am: (Australia) Broc Feeney; Pro-Am: (Australia) Brad Schumacher	2025 GT World Challenge Australia
GT World Challenge Australia	Pro-Am Teams: (Australia) Melbourne Performance Centre	2025 GT World Challenge Australia
GT World Challenge Australia	Am: (Australia) Renee Gracie	2025 GT World Challenge Australia
GT World Challenge Australia	Am Teams: (Australia) Melbourne Performance Centre	2025 GT World Challenge Australia
GT World Challenge Europe	(South Africa) Kelvin van der Linde (Belgium) Charles Weerts	2025 GT World Challenge Europe
GT World Challenge Europe	Teams: (Belgium) Team WRT	2025 GT World Challenge Europe
GT World Challenge Europe	Gold Cup: (United Kingdom) Chris Lulham; Gold: (Netherlands) Thierry Vermeulen	2025 GT World Challenge Europe
GT World Challenge Europe	Gold Cup Teams: (Belgium) Team WRT	2025 GT World Challenge Europe
GT World Challenge Europe	Silver Cup: (France) César Gazeau; Silver: (France) Aurelien Panis	2025 GT World Challenge Europe
GT World Challenge Europe	Silver Cup Teams: (Belgium) Boutsen VDS	2025 GT World Challenge Europe
GT World Challenge Europe	Bronze Cup: (United States) Dustin Blattner; Bronze: (Germany) Dennis Marschall	2025 GT World Challenge Europe
GT World Challenge Europe	Bronze Cup Teams: (Switzerland) Kessel Racing	2025 GT World Challenge Europe
GT World Challenge Europe Endurance Cup	(Germany) Sven Müller (Switzerland) Patric Niederhauser (Belgium) Alessio Picariello	2025 GT World Challenge Europe Endurance Cup
GT World Challenge Europe Endurance Cup	Teams: (Germany) Rutronik Racing	2025 GT World Challenge Europe Endurance Cup
GT World Challenge Europe Endurance Cup	Gold Cup: (United Kingdom) Harry King; Gold Cup: (United Kingdom) Chris Lulham; Gold Cup: (Netherlands) Thierry Vermeulen	2025 GT World Challenge Europe Endurance Cup
GT World Challenge Europe Endurance Cup	Gold Cup Teams: (Netherlands) Verstappen.com Racing	2025 GT World Challenge Europe Endurance Cup
GT World Challenge Europe Endurance Cup	Silver Cup: (Netherlands) Mex Jansen; Silver Cup: (United Kingdom) Will Moore; Silver Cup: (South Africa) Jarrod Waberski	2025 GT World Challenge Europe Endurance Cup
GT World Challenge Europe Endurance Cup	Silver Cup Teams: (United Kingdom) Century Motorsport	2025 GT World Challenge Europe Endurance Cup
GT World Challenge Europe Endurance Cup	Bronze Cup: (United States) Dustin Blattner; Bronze Cup: (Denmark) Conrad Laursen; Bronze Cup: (United States) Dennis Marschall	2025 GT World Challenge Europe Endurance Cup
GT World Challenge Europe Endurance Cup	Bronze Cup Teams: (Switzerland) Kessel Racing	2025 GT World Challenge Europe Endurance Cup
GT World Challenge Europe Sprint Cup	(South Africa) Kelvin van der Linde (Belgium) Charles Weerts	2025 GT World Challenge Europe Sprint Cup
GT World Challenge Europe Sprint Cup	Teams: (Belgium) Team WRT	2025 GT World Challenge Europe Sprint Cup
GT World Challenge Europe Sprint Cup	Gold Cup: (United Kingdom) Chris Lulham; Gold Cup: (Netherlands) Thierry Vermeulen	2025 GT World Challenge Europe Sprint Cup
GT World Challenge Europe Sprint Cup	Gold Cup Teams: (Switzerland) Emil Frey Racing	2025 GT World Challenge Europe Sprint Cup
GT World Challenge Europe Sprint Cup	Silver Cup: (United Arab Emirates) Jamie Day; Silver Cup: (Belgium) Kobe Pauwels	2025 GT World Challenge Europe Sprint Cup
GT World Challenge Europe Sprint Cup	Silver Cup Teams: (Belgium) Comtoyou Racing	2025 GT World Challenge Europe Sprint Cup
GT World Challenge Europe Sprint Cup	Bronze Cup: (United States) Dustin Blattner; Bronze Cup: (Germany) Dennis Marschall	2025 GT World Challenge Europe Sprint Cup
GT World Challenge Europe Sprint Cup	Bronze Cup Teams: (Switzerland) Kessel Racing	2025 GT World Challenge Europe Sprint Cup
GT2 European Series	Pro-Am: (Czech Republic) Bronek Formanek; Pro-Am: (Slovakia) Stefan Rosina	2025 GT2 European Series
GT2 European Series	Pro-Am Teams: (United Arab Emirates) Micanek Motorsport powered by Buggyra	2025 GT2 European Series
GT2 European Series	Am: (Italy) Philippe Prette	2025 GT2 European Series
GT2 European Series	Am Teams: (Italy) LP Racing	2025 GT2 European Series
GT4 America Series	Silver: (United States) Kevin Boehm; Silver: (United States) Kenton Koch	2025 GT4 America Series
GT4 America Series	Pro-Am: (United States) Sam Craven; Pro-Am: (United States) Josh Green	2025 GT4 America Series
GT4 America Series	Am: (United States) James Clay; Am: (United States) Charlie Postins	2025 GT4 America Series
GT4 Australia Series	Silver: (Australia) Max Geoghegan; Silver: (Australia) Tom Hayman	2025 GT4 Australia Series
GT4 Australia Series	Teams: (Australia) Method Motorsport	2025 GT4 Australia Series
GT4 Australia Series	Silver-Am: (Australia) Jason Gomersall; Silver-Am: (Australia) Aaron Seton	2025 GT4 Australia Series
GT4 Australia Series	Am: (Australia) Jacob Lawrence	2025 GT4 Australia Series
GT4 European Series	Silver: (France) Robert Consani; Silver: (France) Benjamin Lariche	2025 GT4 European Series
GT4 European Series	Silver Teams: (France) Team Speedcar	2025 GT4 European Series
GT4 European Series	Pro-Am: Stanslav Safronov; Pro-Am: Aleksandr Vaintrub	2025 GT4 European Series
GT4 European Series	Pro-Am Teams: (Spain) Mirage Racing	2025 GT4 European Series
GT4 European Series	Am: (Germany) Daniel Blickle; Am: (Germany) Max Kronberg	2025 GT4 European Series
GT4 European Series	Am Teams: (Germany) W&S Motorsport	2025 GT4 European Series
GT4 Winter Series	(United Kingdom) McKenzy Cresswell	2025 GT4 Winter Series
GT4 Winter Series	Teams: (United Kingdom) Elite Motorsport	2025 GT4 Winter Series
GT4 Winter Series	Pro: (United Kingdom) McKenzy Cresswell	2025 GT4 Winter Series
GT4 Winter Series	Pro-Am: (Germany) Nico Gründel; Pro-Am: (United States) Tim Horrell	2025 GT4 Winter Series
GT4 Winter Series	Am: (Germany) Joachim Bölting	2025 GT4 Winter Series
GT4 Winter Series	Cayman Trophy: (Germany) Wilhelm Kühne; Cayman Trophy: (Germany) Cedric Fuchs	2025 GT4 Winter Series
GT4 Winter Series	Club: (Germany) Thilo Goos	2025 GT4 Winter Series
IMSA Ford Mustang Challenge	(United States) Robert Noaker	2025 IMSA Ford Mustang Challenge
IMSA Ford Mustang Challenge	Teams: (United States) Robert Noaker Racing	2025 IMSA Ford Mustang Challenge
IMSA Ford Mustang Challenge	Legends: (United States) Alex Bachoura	2025 IMSA Ford Mustang Challenge
IMSA SportsCar Championship	GTP: (Australia) Matt Campbell; GTP: (France) Mathieu Jaminet	2025 IMSA SportsCar Championship
IMSA SportsCar Championship	GTP Teams: (United States) #6 Porsche Penske Motorsport	2025 IMSA SportsCar Championship
IMSA SportsCar Championship	GTP Manufacturers: (Germany) Porsche	2025 IMSA SportsCar Championship
IMSA SportsCar Championship	LMP2: (United States) Dane Cameron; LMP2: (United States) P. J. Hyett	2025 IMSA SportsCar Championship
IMSA SportsCar Championship	LMP2 Teams: (United States) #99 AO Racing	2025 IMSA SportsCar Championship
IMSA SportsCar Championship	GTD Pro: (Spain) Antonio García; GTD Pro: (United Kingdom) Alexander Sims	2025 IMSA SportsCar Championship
IMSA SportsCar Championship	GTD Pro Teams: (United States) #3 Corvette Racing by Pratt Miller Motorsports	2025 IMSA SportsCar Championship
IMSA SportsCar Championship	GTD Pro Manufacturers: (United States) Chevrolet	2025 IMSA SportsCar Championship
IMSA SportsCar Championship	GTD: (Switzerland) Philip Ellis; GTD: (United States) Russell Ward	2025 IMSA SportsCar Championship
IMSA SportsCar Championship	GTD Teams: (United States) #57 Winward Racing	2025 IMSA SportsCar Championship
IMSA SportsCar Championship	GTD Manufacturers: (Germany) Mercedes-AMG	2025 IMSA SportsCar Championship
IMSA VP Racing SportsCar Challenge	LMP3: (Germany) Valentino Catalano	2025 IMSA VP Racing SportsCar Challenge
IMSA VP Racing SportsCar Challenge	LMP3 Teams: (Germany) #30 Gebhardt Motorsport	2025 IMSA VP Racing SportsCar Challenge
IMSA VP Racing SportsCar Challenge	GTDX: (United States) Adam Adelson	2025 IMSA VP Racing SportsCar Challenge
IMSA VP Racing SportsCar Challenge	GTDX Teams: (United States) #24 Wright Motorsports	2025 IMSA VP Racing SportsCar Challenge
IMSA VP Racing SportsCar Challenge	GSX: (Brazil) Kiko Porto	2025 IMSA VP Racing SportsCar Challenge
IMSA VP Racing SportsCar Challenge	GSX Teams: (United States) #8 RAFA Racing Team	2025 IMSA VP Racing SportsCar Challenge
Intercontinental GT Challenge	(South Africa) Kelvin van der Linde	2025 Intercontinental GT Challenge
Intercontinental GT Challenge	Independent Cup: (Australia) Kenny Habul	2025 Intercontinental GT Challenge
Intercontinental GT Challenge	Manufacturers: (Germany) BMW	2025 Intercontinental GT Challenge
International GT Open	(Hungary) Levente Révész	2025 International GT Open
International GT Open	Pro-Am: (Austria) Dominik Baumann; Pro-Am: (Germany) Valentin Pierburg	2025 International GT Open
International GT Open	Am: (Switzerland) Gino Forgione; Am: (Italy) Michele Rugolo	2025 International GT Open
Italian GT Championship Endurance Cup	GT3: (Italy) Riccardo Cazzaniga; GT3: (Italy) Rocco Mazzola; GT3: (Germany) Fabio Rauer	2025 Italian GT Championship Endurance Cup
Italian GT Championship Endurance Cup	GT3 Teams: (Germany) Attempto Racing	2025 Italian GT Championship Endurance Cup
Italian GT Championship Endurance Cup	GT3 Pro-Am: (Egypt) Ibrahim Badawy; GT3 Pro-Am: (Italy) Leonardo Colavita; GT3 Pro-Am: (Spain) David Vidales	2025 Italian GT Championship Endurance Cup
Italian GT Championship Endurance Cup	GT3 Am: (Italy) Francesco Castellacci; GT3 Am: (United Kingdom) Jason Ambrose; GT3 Am: (United Kingdom) David McDonald	2025 Italian GT Championship Endurance Cup
Italian GT Championship Endurance Cup	GT Cup Div. 1 Pro-Am: (Italy) Fabrizio Fontana; GT Cup Div. 1 Pro-Am: (Italy) Stefano Gai	2025 Italian GT Championship Endurance Cup
Italian GT Championship Endurance Cup	GT Cup Div. 1 Am: (Italy) Diego Locanto; GT Cup Div. 1 Am: (Italy) Luca Segù	2025 Italian GT Championship Endurance Cup
Italian GT Championship Endurance Cup	GT Cup Div. 2 Pro-Am: (Italy) Paolo Calcagno	2025 Italian GT Championship Endurance Cup
Italian GT Championship Endurance Cup	GT Cup Div. 2 Am: (Italy) Gianluca Carboni; GT Cup Div. 2 Am: (Italy) Davide di Benedetto; GT Cup Div. 2 Am: (Italy) Giuseppe Nicolosi	2025 Italian GT Championship Endurance Cup
Italian GT Championship Endurance Cup	GT Cup Teams: (Italy) AF Corse	2025 Italian GT Championship Endurance Cup
Italian GT Championship Sprint Cup	GT3: (Italy) Andrea Frassineti	2025 Italian GT Championship
Italian GT Championship Sprint Cup	GT3 Teams: (Italy) VSR	2025 Italian GT Championship
Italian GT Championship Sprint Cup	GT3 Pro-Am: (Italy) Mattia Michelotto; GT3 Pro-Am: (Italy) Ignazio Zanon	2025 Italian GT Championship
Italian GT Championship Sprint Cup	GT3 Am: (Italy) Marco Cassarà; GT3 Am: (Italy) Alberto Clementi Pisani	2025 Italian GT Championship
Italian GT Championship Sprint Cup	GT Cup Div. 1 Pro-Am: (Italy) Andrea Fontana	2025 Italian GT Championship
Italian GT Championship Sprint Cup	GT Cup Div. 1 Am: (Italy) Gaetano Oliva; GT Cup Div. 1 Am: (Italy) Piergiacomo Randazzo	2025 Italian GT Championship
Italian GT Championship Sprint Cup	GT Cup Div. 2 Pro-Am: (Italy) Flavio Olivieri	2025 Italian GT Championship
Italian GT Championship Sprint Cup	GT Cup Div. 2 Am: (Italy) Carlo Contessi; GT Cup Div. 2 Am: (Italy) Steven Giacon	2025 Italian GT Championship
Italian GT Championship Sprint Cup	GT Cup Teams: (Italy) Target Racing	2025 Italian GT Championship
Le Mans Cup	LMP3: (France) Hadrien David; LMP3: (Germany) Hugo Schwarze	2025 Le Mans Cup
Le Mans Cup	LMP3 Teams: (France) #85 R-ace GP	2025 Le Mans Cup
Le Mans Cup	LMP3 Pro-Am: (Belgium) Eric De Doncker; LMP3 Pro-Am: (France) Gillian Henrion	2025 Le Mans Cup
Le Mans Cup	LMP3 Pro-Am Teams: (Belgium) #98 Motorsport98	2025 Le Mans Cup
Le Mans Cup	GT3: (Italy) Alessandro Cozzi; GT3: (Italy) Eliseo Donno	2025 Le Mans Cup
Le Mans Cup	GT3 Teams: (Italy) #51 AF Corse	2025 Le Mans Cup
Ligier European Series	JS P4: (United Kingdom) Maxwell Dodds; JS P4: (France) Iko Segret	2025 Ligier European Series
Ligier European Series	JS P4 Teams: (France) #6 ANS Motorsport	2025 Ligier European Series
Ligier European Series	JS P4 Pro-Am: (United Kingdom) Kristian Brookes; JS P4 Pro-Am: (United Kingdom) Christopher Preen	2025 Ligier European Series
Ligier European Series	JS P4 Pro-Am Teams: (United Kingdom) #33 360 Competition	2025 Ligier European Series
Ligier European Series	JS P4 Am: (France) David Caussanel	2025 Ligier European Series
Ligier European Series	JS P4 Am Teams: (France) #16 Pegasus Racing	2025 Ligier European Series
Ligier European Series	JS2 R: (Italy) Simone Riccitelli	2025 Ligier European Series
Ligier European Series	JS2 R Teams: (Italy) #7 LR Motorsport	2025 Ligier European Series
Ligier European Series	JS2 R Pro-Am: (France) Alain Meyer; JS2 R Pro-Am: (France) Jordan Meyer	2025 Ligier European Series
Ligier European Series	JS2 R Pro-Am Teams: (France) #94 Pegasus Racing	2025 Ligier European Series
Ligier European Series	JS2 R Am: (France) Florian Tiellais	2025 Ligier European Series
Ligier European Series	JS2 R Am Teams: (France) #41 VSF Sports	2025 Ligier European Series
Mazda MX-5 Cup	(United States) Jeremy Fletcher	2025 Mazda MX-5 Cup
Mazda MX-5 Cup Benelux	(Netherlands) Marcel Dekker	2025 Mazda MX-5 Cup Benelux
McLaren Trophy America	Pro: (United States) Casey Dennis; Pro: (United States) James Li	2025 McLaren Trophy America
McLaren Trophy America	Pro-Am: (United States) Alexandra Hainer; Pro-Am: (Canada) Jesse Lazare	2025 McLaren Trophy America
McLaren Trophy America	Am: (United States) James Sofronas	2025 McLaren Trophy America
McLaren Trophy Europe	Pro: (United Kingdom) Jayden Kelly; Pro: (United Kingdom) Michael O'Brien	2025 McLaren Trophy Europe
McLaren Trophy Europe	Pro-Am: (United Kingdom) Ryan James; Pro-Am: (United Kingdom) Oliver Webb	2025 McLaren Trophy Europe
McLaren Trophy Europe	Am: (United Kingdom) Tim Docker	2025 McLaren Trophy Europe
McLaren Trophy Europe	Papaya Cup: (Germany) Klaus Halsig	2025 McLaren Trophy Europe
McLaren Trophy Europe	Teams: (United Kingdom) #17 Greystone GT	2025 McLaren Trophy Europe
Michelin Pilot Challenge	GS: (Belgium) Jan Heylen; GS: (United States) Luca Mars	2025 Michelin Pilot Challenge
Michelin Pilot Challenge	GS Teams: (United States) #28 RennSport1	2025 Michelin Pilot Challenge
Michelin Pilot Challenge	GS Manufacturers: (Germany) Porsche	2025 Michelin Pilot Challenge
Michelin Pilot Challenge	TCR: (United States) Harry Gottsacker	2025 Michelin Pilot Challenge
Michelin Pilot Challenge	TCR Teams: (United States) #98 Bryan Herta Autosport w/ Curb-Agajanian	2025 Michelin Pilot Challenge
Michelin Pilot Challenge	TCR Manufacturers: (South Korea) Hyundai	2025 Michelin Pilot Challenge
Middle East Trophy	GT3: (Netherlands) Loek Hartog	2025 Middle East Trophy
Middle East Trophy	GT3 Teams: (United States) #16 Winward Racing	2025 Middle East Trophy
Middle East Trophy	GT3 Pro-Am: (Russia) Sergey Stolyarov	2025 Middle East Trophy
Middle East Trophy	GT3 Pro-Am Teams: (United States) #16 Winward Racing	2025 Middle East Trophy
Middle East Trophy	GT3 Am: (Switzerland) Chantal Prinz; GT3 Am: (Switzerland) Alexander Prinz; GT3 Am: (Switzerland) Michael Kroll; GT3 Am: (Germany) Timo Rumpfkeil	2025 Middle East Trophy
Middle East Trophy	GT3 Am Teams: (Switzerland) #11 Hofor Racing	2025 Middle East Trophy
Middle East Trophy	992: (Qatar) Abdulla Ali Al Khelaifi; 992: (Qatar) Ibrahim Al Abdulghani; 992: (Qatar) Ghanim Al Ali; 992: (Germany) Julian Hanses	2025 Middle East Trophy
Middle East Trophy	992 Teams: (Qatar) #974 QMMF by HRT	2025 Middle East Trophy
Middle East Trophy	992 Am: (Qatar) Abdulla Ali Al Khelaifi; 992 Am: (Qatar) Ibrahim Al Abdulghani; 992 Am: (Qatar) Ghanim Al Ali; 992 Am: (Germany) Julian Hanses	2025 Middle East Trophy
Middle East Trophy	992 Am Teams: (Qatar) #974 QMMF by HRT	2025 Middle East Trophy
Middle East Trophy	GTX: (Australia) Jake Camilleri; GTX: (Australia) Darren Currie; GTX: (Australia) Grant Donaldson	2025 Middle East Trophy
Middle East Trophy	GTX Teams: (Australia) #111 111 Racing	2025 Middle East Trophy
Middle East Trophy	GT4: (Romania) Tudor Tudurachi	2025 Middle East Trophy
Middle East Trophy	GT4 Teams: (United Kingdom) #438 AGMC Racing by Simpson Motorsport	2025 Middle East Trophy
Middle East Trophy	TCE Teams: (Germany) #102 asBest Racing	2025 Middle East Trophy
Middle East Trophy	TCX Teams: (Germany) #102 asBest Racing	2025 Middle East Trophy
Prototype Cup Germany	(United States) Danny Soufi (Bulgaria) Pavel Lefterov	2025 Prototype Cup Germany
Prototype Cup Germany	Teams: (Austria) Konrad Motorsport	2025 Prototype Cup Germany
Prototype Winter Series	(United States) Danny Soufi	2025 Prototype Winter Series
Prototype Winter Series	Teams: (Austria) Konrad Motorsport	2025 Prototype Winter Series
Radical Cup Australia	(Australia) Cooper Cutts	2025 Radical Cup Australia
Radical Cup Australia	Teams: (Australia) Arise Racing	2025 Radical Cup Australia
Radical Cup UK	(United Kingdom) Marcus Littlewood	2025 Radical Cup UK
Radical Cup UK	Teams: (United Kingdom) Regent Services Racing	2025 Radical Cup UK
Radical Cup UK	Fangio: (United Kingdom) John Macleod	2025 Radical Cup UK
SRO GT Cup	(China) Han Lichao	2025 SRO GT Cup
SRO GT Cup	Teams: Toyota Gazoo Racing China	2025 SRO GT Cup
SRO GT Cup	Silver: (China) Han Lichao	2025 SRO GT Cup
SRO GT Cup	Am: (Germany) Moritz Berrenberg	2025 SRO GT Cup
SRO Japan Cup	GT3: (Japan) Shintaro Kawabata; GT3: (Japan) Akihiro Tsuzuki	2025 SRO Japan Cup
SRO Japan Cup	GT3 Teams: (Japan) Hitotsuyama with Cornes Racing	2025 SRO Japan Cup
SRO Japan Cup	GT3 Pro-Am: (Japan) Shintaro Kawabata; GT3 Pro-Am: (Japan) Akihiro Tsuzuki	2025 SRO Japan Cup
SRO Japan Cup	GT3 Am: (Japan) Hirokazu Suzuki; GT3 Am: (Japan) Tadao Uematsu	2025 SRO Japan Cup
SRO Japan Cup	GTC: (Chinese Taipei) Tiger Wu	2025 SRO Japan Cup
SRO Japan Cup	GTC Teams: (Japan) Bingo Racing	2025 SRO Japan Cup
SRO Japan Cup	GTC Pro-Am: (Australia) Jake Parsons; GTC Pro-Am: (Canada) Jesse Anthony Swinimer	2025 SRO Japan Cup
SRO Japan Cup	GTC Am: (Chinese Taipei) Tiger Wu Chi-hsuan	2025 SRO Japan Cup
SRO Japan Cup	GT4: (Indonesia) Haridarma Manoppo; GT4: (Japan) Seita Nonaka	2025 SRO Japan Cup
SRO Japan Cup	GT4 Teams: Toyota Gazoo Racing Indonesia	2025 SRO Japan Cup
SRO Japan Cup	GT4 Silver-Am: (Indonesia) Haridarma Manoppo; GT4 Silver: (Japan) Seita Nonaka	2025 SRO Japan Cup
SRO Japan Cup	GT4 Am: (Chinese Taipei) Betty Chen Yin-yu; GT4 Am: (Japan) Yoshichika Nagai	2025 SRO Japan Cup
Super GT	GT500: (Japan) Sho Tsuboi; GT500: (Japan) Kenta Yamashita	2025 Super GT Series
Super GT	GT500 Teams: (Japan) No. 1 TGR Team au TOM'S	2025 Super GT Series
Super GT	GT300: (Japan) Naoya Gamou; GT300: (Japan) Togo Suganami	2025 Super GT Series
Super GT	GT300 Teams: (Japan) No. 65 K2 R&D LEON Racing	2025 Super GT Series
Super Taikyu Series	ST-X: (Japan) No. 666 Seven x Seven Racing	2025 Super Taikyu Series
Super Taikyu Series	ST-Z: (Japan) No. 52 Saitama Green Brave	2025 Super Taikyu Series
Super Taikyu Series	ST-TCR: (Japan) No. 98 Waimarama Racing	2025 Super Taikyu Series
Super Taikyu Series	ST-USA: (United States) No. 249 TechSport Racing	2025 Super Taikyu Series
Super Taikyu Series	ST-1: (Japan) No. 47 D'station Racing	2025 Super Taikyu Series
Super Taikyu Series	ST-2: (Japan) No. 72 Nihon Automobile College	2025 Super Taikyu Series
Super Taikyu Series	ST-3: (Japan) No. 39 Tracy Sports with Delta	2025 Super Taikyu Series
Super Taikyu Series	ST-4: (Japan) No. 884 SHADE Racing	2025 Super Taikyu Series
Super Taikyu Series	ST-5 5F: (Japan) No. 67 Team Yamato	2025 Super Taikyu Series
Super Taikyu Series	ST-5 5R: (Japan) No. 88 Murakami Motors	2025 Super Taikyu Series
TA2 Racing Muscle Car Series	(Australia) Jarrod Hughes	2025 TA2 Racing Muscle Car Series
TA2 Racing Muscle Car Series	Masters: (Australia) Graham Cheney	2025 TA2 Racing Muscle Car Series
Thailand Super Series	GT3: (Thailand) Vutthikorn Inthraphuvasak	2025 Thailand Super Series
Thailand Super Series	GT3 Am: (Malaysia) Aaron Lim; GT3 Am: (Malaysia) Haziq Zairel Oh	2025 Thailand Super Series
Thailand Super Series	GT3 Porsche Sprint Trophy: (Thailand) Vutthikorn Inthraphuvasak	2025 Thailand Super Series
Thailand Super Series	GT3 Teams: Singha Motorsport Team Thailand	2025 Thailand Super Series
Thailand Super Series	GT4: (Malaysia) Naquib Azlan; GT4: (Malaysia) Mitchell Cheah Min Jie	2025 Thailand Super Series
Thailand Super Series	GT4 Am: (Australia) Todd James Kingsford	2025 Thailand Super Series
Thailand Super Series	GT4 Porsche Sprint Trophy: (Thailand) Kmik Karnasuta; GT4 Porsche Sprint Trophy: (Thailand) Kantadhee Kusiri	2025 Thailand Super Series
Thailand Super Series	GT4 Teams: (Thailand) AAS Motorsport	2025 Thailand Super Series
Thailand Super Series	GTM: (Thailand) Saraput Sereethoranakul; GTM: (Malaysia) Afiq Yazid	2025 Thailand Super Series
Thailand Super Series	GTM Am: (Thailand) Nattavude Charoensukhawatana	2025 Thailand Super Series
Thailand Super Series	GTM Porsche Sprint Trophy: (Hong Kong) Simon Sye Wai Chan	2025 Thailand Super Series
Thailand Super Series	GTM Teams: Toyota Gazoo Racing Thailand	2025 Thailand Super Series
Thailand Super Series	GTC: (Singapore) Shane Ang; GTC: (Singapore) Kenneth Ho	2025 Thailand Super Series
Thailand Super Series	GTC Teams: (Singapore) Supersonic By Rongpo Power Unit	2025 Thailand Super Series
Trans-Am Series	TA: (United States) Paul Menard	2025 Trans-Am Series
Trans-Am Series	TA2: (United States) Tristan McKee	2025 Trans-Am Series
Trans-Am Series	TA2 Pro-Am: (United States) Jared Odrick	2025 Trans-Am Series
Trans-Am Series	XGT: (United States) Kaylee Bryson	2025 Trans-Am Series
Trans-Am Series	SGT: (United States) Joshua Carlson	2025 Trans-Am Series
Trans-Am Series	GT: (United States) Chris Coffey	2025 Trans-Am Series
Trans-Am Series	GT1: (United States) Jon DeGaynor	2025 Trans-Am Series
Ultimate Cup European Series	Endurance Prototype Cup: (France) Romain Carton	2025 Ultimate Cup European Series
Ultimate Cup European Series	Endurance Prototype Cup Teams: (France) 23 Events Racing	2025 Ultimate Cup European Series
Ultimate Cup European Series	Sprint Prototype Cup: (United Kingdom) Ewan Thomas	2025 Ultimate Cup European Series
Ultimate Cup European Series	Sprint Prototype Cup Teams: (Czech Republic) Bretton Racing	2025 Ultimate Cup European Series
Ultimate Cup European Series	GT Endurance Cup: (France) Jean-Bernard Bouvet; GT Endurance Cup: (France) Jean-Paul Pagny	2025 Ultimate Cup European Series
Ultimate Cup European Series	GT Endurance Cup Teams: (France) Visiom	2025 Ultimate Cup European Series
Ultimate Cup European Series	GT Sprint Cup: (Republic of Ireland) Lyle Schofield	2025 Ultimate Cup European Series
Ultimate Cup European Series	GT Sprint Cup Teams: (Italy) SR&R	2025 Ultimate Cup European Series
Ferrari Challenge
Ferrari Challenge Australasia	Trofeo Pirelli: (Australia) Antoine Gittany	2025 Ferrari Challenge Australasia
Ferrari Challenge Australasia	Coppa Shell: (Australia) Enzo Cheng	2025 Ferrari Challenge Australasia
Ferrari Challenge Australasia	488 Challenge: (Australia) Michel Stephan	2025 Ferrari Challenge Australasia
Ferrari Challenge Europe	Trofeo Pirelli: (Switzerland) Felix Hirsiger	2025 Ferrari Challenge Europe
Ferrari Challenge Europe	Trofeo Pirelli Am: (Czech Republic) Hendrik Viol	2025 Ferrari Challenge Europe
Ferrari Challenge Europe	Coppa Shell: (Italy) Manuela Gostner	2025 Ferrari Challenge Europe
Ferrari Challenge Japan	Trofeo Pirelli: (Japan) Sota Muto	2025 Ferrari Challenge Japan
Ferrari Challenge Japan	Trofeo Pirelli Am: (Japan) Yamatatsu	2025 Ferrari Challenge Japan
Ferrari Challenge Japan	Coppa Shell: (South Korea) Phil Kim	2025 Ferrari Challenge Japan
Ferrari Challenge Japan	Coppa Shell Am: (France) Alex Fox	2025 Ferrari Challenge Japan
Ferrari Challenge Japan	488 Challenge: (Japan) Yosuke Yamaki	2025 Ferrari Challenge Japan
Ferrari Challenge North America	Trofeo Pirelli: (United States) Massimo Perrina	2025 Ferrari Challenge North America
Ferrari Challenge North America	Trofeo Pirelli Am: (United States) Brad Fauvre	2025 Ferrari Challenge North America
Ferrari Challenge North America	Coppa Shell: (United States) Michael Owens	2025 Ferrari Challenge North America
Ferrari Challenge UK	Trofeo Pirelli: (United Kingdom) Gilbert Yates	2025 Ferrari Challenge UK
Ferrari Challenge UK	Coppa Shell: (United Kingdom) Mike Dewhirst	2025 Ferrari Challenge UK
Lamborghini Super Trofeo
Lamborghini Super Trofeo Asia	Pro: (Macau) Hon Chio Leong; Pro: (Republic of Ireland) Alex Denning	2025 Lamborghini Super Trofeo Asia
Lamborghini Super Trofeo Asia	Pro-Am: (Hong Kong) Kaishun Liu; Pro-Am: (China) Qikuan Cao	2025 Lamborghini Super Trofeo Asia
Lamborghini Super Trofeo Asia	Am: (Thailand) Suttiluck Buncharoen	2025 Lamborghini Super Trofeo Asia
Lamborghini Super Trofeo Asia	LB Cup: (Thailand) Supachai Weeraborwornpong	2025 Lamborghini Super Trofeo Asia
Lamborghini Super Trofeo Asia	Teams: (Hong Kong) Theodore Racing	2025 Lamborghini Super Trofeo Asia
Lamborghini Super Trofeo Europe	Pro: (Malaysia) Adam Putera	2025 Lamborghini Super Trofeo Europe
Lamborghini Super Trofeo Europe	Pro-Am: (United Kingdom) Georgi Dimitrov; Pro-Am: (France) Stéphan Guerin	2025 Lamborghini Super Trofeo Europe
Lamborghini Super Trofeo Europe	Am: (Italy) Massimo Ciglia; Am: (Italy) Pietro Perolini	2025 Lamborghini Super Trofeo Europe
Lamborghini Super Trofeo Europe	LB Cup: (Saudi Arabia) Karim Ojjeh	2025 Lamborghini Super Trofeo Europe
Lamborghini Super Trofeo Europe	Teams: (Italy) Target Racing	2025 Lamborghini Super Trofeo Europe
Lamborghini Super Trofeo North America	Pro: (Costa Rica) Danny Formal; Pro: (Sweden) Hampus Ericsson	2025 Lamborghini Super Trofeo North America
Lamborghini Super Trofeo North America	Pro-Am: (United States) Conrad Geis; Pro-Am: (United States) Jason Hart	2025 Lamborghini Super Trofeo North America
Lamborghini Super Trofeo North America	Am: (United States) Glenn McGee; Am: (United States) Graham Doyle	2025 Lamborghini Super Trofeo North America
Lamborghini Super Trofeo North America	LB Cup: (United States) Nick Groat	2025 Lamborghini Super Trofeo North America
Lamborghini Super Trofeo North America	Teams: (United States) Wayne Taylor Racing	2025 Lamborghini Super Trofeo North America
Lamborghini Super Trofeo North America	Dealers: (United States) Lamborghini Palm Beach	2025 Lamborghini Super Trofeo North America
Porsche Supercup, Porsche Carrera Cup, GT3 Cup Challenge and Porsche Sprint Challenge
Porsche Supercup	(France) Alessandro Ghiretti	2025 Porsche Supercup
Porsche Supercup	Teams: (France) Schumacher CLRT	2025 Porsche Supercup
Porsche Supercup	Rookies: (Netherlands) Flynt Schuring	2025 Porsche Supercup
Porsche Carrera Cup Asia	(Luxembourg) Dylan Pereira	2025 Porsche Carrera Cup Asia
Porsche Carrera Cup Asia	Teams: (China) Team Shanghai Yongda BWT	2025 Porsche Carrera Cup Asia
Porsche Carrera Cup Asia	Pro-Am: (China) Bao Jinlong	2025 Porsche Carrera Cup Asia
Porsche Carrera Cup Asia	Am: (Hong Kong) Henry Kwong	2025 Porsche Carrera Cup Asia
Porsche Carrera Cup Asia	Masters: (Malaysia) Adrian D'Silva	2025 Porsche Carrera Cup Asia
Porsche Carrera Cup Australia	(Australia) Dylan O'Keeffe	2025 Porsche Carrera Cup Australia
Porsche Carrera Cup Australia	Teams: (Australia) RAM Motorsport	2025 Porsche Carrera Cup Australia
Porsche Carrera Cup Australia	Pro-Am: (Australia) Rodney Jane	2025 Porsche Carrera Cup Australia
Porsche Carrera Cup Australia	Junior: (Australia) Bayley Hall	2025 Porsche Carrera Cup Australia
Porsche Carrera Cup Australia	Endurance Cup Pro: (Australia) Harri Jones	2025 Porsche Carrera Cup Australia
Porsche Carrera Cup Australia	Endurance Cup Pro-Am: (Australia) Matthew Belford	2025 Porsche Carrera Cup Australia
Porsche Carrera Cup Benelux	(Netherlands) Jaap van Lagen	2025 Porsche Carrera Cup Benelux
Porsche Carrera Cup Benelux	Teams: (Belgium) Team RaceArt	2025 Porsche Carrera Cup Benelux
Porsche Carrera Cup Benelux	Pro-Am: (Netherlands) Jules Grouwels	2025 Porsche Carrera Cup Benelux
Porsche Carrera Cup Benelux	Am: (Poland) Milan Marczak	2025 Porsche Carrera Cup Benelux
Porsche Carrera Cup Brasil	(Brazil) Miguel Paludo	2025 Porsche Cup Brasil
Porsche Carrera Cup Brasil	Sport: (Brazil) Marcos Regadas	2025 Porsche Cup Brasil
Porsche Carrera Cup Brasil	Rookies: (Brazil) Silvio Morestoni	2025 Porsche Cup Brasil
Porsche Carrera Cup Brasil	Masters: (Brazil) Nelson Monteiro	2025 Porsche Cup Brasil
Porsche Sprint Challenge Brasil	(Brazil) Caio Chaves	2025 Porsche Cup Brasil
Porsche Sprint Challenge Brasil	Sport: (Brazil) Lucas Locatelli	2025 Porsche Cup Brasil
Porsche Sprint Challenge Brasil	Rookies: (Brazil) Daniel Neumann	2025 Porsche Cup Brasil
Porsche Sprint Trophy Brasil	(Brazil) Neto Carloni	2025 Porsche Cup Brasil
Porsche Sprint Trophy Brasil	Sport: (Brazil) Gabriel Guper	2025 Porsche Cup Brasil
Porsche Endurance Carrera Brasil	(Brazil) Marçal Müller (Brazil) Felipe Fraga	2025 Porsche Cup Brasil
Porsche Endurance Carrera Brasil	Sport: (Brazil) Josimar Junior; Sport: (Brazil) Sérgio Ramalho	2025 Porsche Cup Brasil
Porsche Endurance Carrera Brasil	Rookies: (Brazil) Marco Pisani; Rookies: (Brazil) Renan Guerra	2025 Porsche Cup Brasil
Porsche Endurance Challenge Brasil	(Brazil) José Moura Neto (Brazil) Matheus Iorio	2025 Porsche Cup Brasil
Porsche Endurance Challenge Brasil	Sport: (Brazil) José Moura Neto; Sport: (Brazil) Matheus Iorio	2025 Porsche Cup Brasil
Porsche Endurance Challenge Brasil	Rookies: (Chile) Carlos Ruiz; Rookies: (Chile) Carlos Ruiz Jr.	2025 Porsche Cup Brasil
Porsche Carrera Cup France	(Finland) Marcus Amand	2025 Porsche Carrera Cup France
Porsche Carrera Cup France	Teams: (France) Martinet by Alméras	2025 Porsche Carrera Cup France
Porsche Carrera Cup France	Pro-Am: (France) Marc Guillot	2025 Porsche Carrera Cup France
Porsche Carrera Cup France	Am: (France) Éric Debard	2025 Porsche Carrera Cup France
Porsche Carrera Cup France	Rookies: (Luxembourg) Chester Kieffer	2025 Porsche Carrera Cup France
Porsche Carrera Cup Germany	(Netherlands) Robert de Haan	2025 Porsche Carrera Cup Germany
Porsche Carrera Cup Germany	Teams: (France) Schumacher CLRT	2025 Porsche Carrera Cup Germany
Porsche Carrera Cup Germany	Pro-Am: (Germany) Michael Schrey	2025 Porsche Carrera Cup Germany
Porsche Carrera Cup Germany	Rookies: (Netherlands) Sacha Norden	2025 Porsche Carrera Cup Germany
Porsche Carrera Cup Great Britain	(South Africa) Andrew Rackstraw	2025 Porsche Carrera Cup Great Britain
Porsche Carrera Cup Great Britain	Teams: (United Kingdom) Rosland Gold By Century Motorsport	2025 Porsche Carrera Cup Great Britain
Porsche Carrera Cup Great Britain	Pro-Am: (United Kingdom) Oliver White	2025 Porsche Carrera Cup Great Britain
Porsche Carrera Cup Great Britain	Am: (United Kingdom) Jonathon Beeson	2025 Porsche Carrera Cup Great Britain
Porsche Carrera Cup Great Britain	Rookies: (United Kingdom) Seb Hopkins	2025 Porsche Carrera Cup Great Britain
Porsche Carrera Cup Italia	(South Africa) Keagan Masters	2025 Porsche Carrera Cup Italia
Porsche Carrera Cup Italia	Teams: (Italy) BeDriver	2025 Porsche Carrera Cup Italia
Porsche Carrera Cup Italia	Rookies: (Italy) Pietro Delli Guanti	2025 Porsche Carrera Cup Italia
Porsche Carrera Cup Italia	Michelin Cup: (Italy) Alberto de Amicis	2025 Porsche Carrera Cup Italia
Porsche Carrera Cup Japan	(Japan) Iori Kimura	2025 Porsche Carrera Cup Japan
Porsche Carrera Cup Japan	Teams: (Japan) Seven x Seven Racing	2025 Porsche Carrera Cup Japan
Porsche Carrera Cup Japan	Pro-Am: (Japan) "Bankcy"	2025 Porsche Carrera Cup Japan
Porsche Carrera Cup Japan	Am: (Japan) "Hiro"	2025 Porsche Carrera Cup Japan
Porsche Carrera Cup Middle East	(Germany) Janne Stiak	2024–25 Porsche Carrera Cup Middle East
Porsche Carrera Cup Middle East	Teams: (Saudi Arabia) Saudi Racing	2024–25 Porsche Carrera Cup Middle East
Porsche Carrera Cup Middle East	Pro-Am: (Saudi Arabia) Saud Al Saud	2024–25 Porsche Carrera Cup Middle East
Porsche Carrera Cup Middle East	Masters: (Japan) "Bankcy"	2024–25 Porsche Carrera Cup Middle East
Porsche Carrera Cup North America	(New Zealand) Ryan Yardley	2025 Porsche Carrera Cup North America
Porsche Carrera Cup North America	Teams: (United States) Topp Racing	2025 Porsche Carrera Cup North America
Porsche Carrera Cup North America	Pro-Am: (United States) Juan Pablo Martinez	2025 Porsche Carrera Cup North America
Porsche Carrera Cup North America	Masters: (United States) Scott Blind	2025 Porsche Carrera Cup North America
Porsche Carrera Cup North America	Rookies: (United States) Aaron Jeansonne	2025 Porsche Carrera Cup North America
Porsche Carrera Cup Scandinavia	(Sweden) Daniel Ros	2025 Porsche Carrera Cup Scandinavia
Porsche Carrera Cup Scandinavia	Teams: (Sweden) Fragus Motorsport	2025 Porsche Carrera Cup Scandinavia
Porsche Carrera Cup Scandinavia	Pro-Am: (Sweden) Albin Wärnelöv	2025 Porsche Carrera Cup Scandinavia
Porsche Sprint Challenge Australia	(Australia) Jake Santalucia	2025 Porsche Sprint Challenge Australia
Porsche Sprint Challenge Australia	Pro-Am: (Australia) Ramu Farrell	2025 Porsche Sprint Challenge Australia
Porsche Sprint Challenge Australia	Junior: (Australia) Daniel Quimby	2025 Porsche Sprint Challenge Australia

== Stock car racing ==
Series	Champion	Refer
NASCAR Cup Series	(United States) Kyle Larson	2025 NASCAR Cup Series
NASCAR Cup Series	Manufacturers: (United States) Chevrolet	2025 NASCAR Cup Series
NASCAR Xfinity Series	(United States) Jesse Love	2025 NASCAR Xfinity Series
NASCAR Xfinity Series	Manufacturers: (United States) Chevrolet	2025 NASCAR Xfinity Series
NASCAR Craftsman Truck Series	(United States) Corey Heim	2025 NASCAR Craftsman Truck Series
NASCAR Craftsman Truck Series	Manufacturers: (Japan) Toyota	2025 NASCAR Craftsman Truck Series
NASCAR Brasil Series	(Brazil) Rubens Barrichello	2025 NASCAR Brasil Series
NASCAR Brasil Series	Challenge: (Brazil) Jorge Martelli	2025 NASCAR Brasil Series
NASCAR Brasil Series	Rookies: (Brazil) Alfredinho Ibiapina	2025 NASCAR Brasil Series
NASCAR Brasil Series	Brazilian Championship: (Brazil) Rubens Barrichello	2025 NASCAR Brasil Series
NASCAR Brasil Series	Special Edition Championship: (Brazil) Gabriel Casagrande	2025 NASCAR Brasil Series
NASCAR Canada Series	(Canada) Marc-Antoine Camirand	2025 NASCAR Canada Series
NASCAR Canada Series	Manufacturers: (United States) Chevrolet	2025 NASCAR Canada Series
NASCAR Euro Series	Pro: (Italy) Vittorio Ghirelli	2025 NASCAR Euro Series
NASCAR Euro Series	Open: (Greece) Thomas Krasonis	2025 NASCAR Euro Series
NASCAR Mexico Series	(Mexico) Alex de Alba	2025 NASCAR Mexico Series
NASCAR Mexico Series	Challenge: (Mexico) Diego Ortíz	2025 NASCAR Mexico Series
NASCAR Whelen Modified Tour	(United States) Austin Beers	2025 NASCAR Whelen Modified Tour
ARCA Menards Series	(United States) Brenden Queen	2025 ARCA Menards Series
ARCA Menards Series East	(United States) Isaac Kitzmiller	2025 ARCA Menards Series East
ARCA Menards Series West	(United States) Trevor Huddleston	2025 ARCA Menards Series West
CARS Tour	(United States) Landen Lewis	2025 CARS Tour
SMART Modified Tour	(United States) Luke Baldwin	2025 SMART Modified Tour
Turismo Carretera	(Argentina) Agustín Canapino	2025 Turismo Carretera

== Touring car racing ==
Series	Champion	Refer
British Touring Car Championship	(United Kingdom) Tom Ingram	2025 British Touring Car Championship
British Touring Car Championship	Teams: (United Kingdom) NAPA Racing UK	2025 British Touring Car Championship
British Touring Car Championship	Manufacturers / Constructors: (United Kingdom) EXCELR8 Motorsport / Hyundai	2025 British Touring Car Championship
British Touring Car Championship	Independent: (United Kingdom) Daniel Lloyd	2025 British Touring Car Championship
British Touring Car Championship	Independent Teams: (United Kingdom) Restart Racing	2025 British Touring Car Championship
British Touring Car Championship	Jack Sears Trophy: (Philippines) Daryl DeLeon	2025 British Touring Car Championship
South African Touring Cars	(South Africa) Michael van Rooyen	2025 South African Touring Cars
South African Touring Cars	Supa Cup: (South Africa) Tate Bishop	2025 South African Touring Cars
South African Touring Cars	Masters: (South Africa) Andre Bezuidenhout	2025 South African Touring Cars
Stock Car Pro Series	(Brazil) Felipe Fraga	2025 Stock Car Pro Series
Stock Car Pro Series	Teams: (Brazil) Eurofarma RC	2025 Stock Car Pro Series
Stock Car Pro Series	Manufacturers: (Japan) Mitsubishi	2025 Stock Car Pro Series
Stock Light	(Brazil) Felipe Barrichello Bartz	2025 Stock Light
Stock Light	Teams: (Brazil) W2 ProGP	2025 Stock Light
Supercars Championship	(Australia) Chaz Mostert	2025 Supercars Championship
Supercars Championship	Teams: (Australia) Triple Eight Race Engineering	2025 Supercars Championship
Supercars Championship	Manufacturers: (United States) Chevrolet	2025 Supercars Championship
Supercars Championship	Sprint Cup: (Australia) Broc Feeney	2025 Supercars Championship
Supercars Championship	Enduro Cup: (New Zealand) Matthew Payne; Enduro Cup: (Australia) Garth Tander	2025 Supercars Championship
Super2 Series	(Australia) Rylan Gray	2025 Super2 Series
Super2 Series	Teams: (Australia) Tickford Racing	2025 Super2 Series
Thailand Super Touring Series	(Thailand) Thanaroj Tanasitnitikate (Thailand) Nattanid Leewattanavaragul	2025 Thailand Super Touring Series
Thailand Super Touring Series	Teams: (Thailand) YK Motorsports	2025 Thailand Super Touring Series
Touring Car Masters	(Australia) Joel Heinrich	2025 Touring Car Masters
Touring Car Masters	Pro-Am: (Australia) Danny Buzadzic	2025 Touring Car Masters
Touring Car Masters	Pro Sport: (Australia) Jeremy Hassell	2025 Touring Car Masters
TCR Touring Car
FIA TCR World Tour	(France) Yann Ehrlacher	2025 TCR World Tour
FIA TCR World Tour	Teams: (Sweden) Lynk & Co Cyan Racing	2025 TCR World Tour
TC America Series	(United States) Jeff Ricca	2025 TC America Series
TC America Series	Teams: (United States) Ricca Autosport	2025 TC America Series
TC America Series	Manufacturers: (South Korea) Hyundai	2025 TC America Series
TC America Series	Hyundai Cup: (United States) Jeff Ricca	2025 TC America Series
TCR Asia Series	(Chinese Taipei) Chang Chien-Shang	2025 TCR Asia Series
TCR Asia Series	Cup: (Indonesia) Benny Santoso	2025 TCR Asia Series
TCR Australia Touring Car Series	(Australia) Josh Buchan	2025 TCR Australia Touring Car Series
TCR Australia Touring Car Series	Kumho Cup: (Hong Kong) Lo Sze Ho	2025 TCR Australia Touring Car Series
TCR Brazil Touring Car Championship	(Brazil) Nelson Piquet Jr.	2025 TCR Brazil Touring Car Championship
TCR Brazil Touring Car Championship	Teams: (Argentina) Honda YPF Racing	2025 TCR Brazil Touring Car Championship
TCR Brazil Touring Car Championship	Trophy Cup: (Brazil) Enzo Gianfratti	2025 TCR Brazil Touring Car Championship
TCR China Challenge	(China) Liu Zichen	2025 TCR China Challenge
TCR China Challenge	Teams: (China) 326 Racing Team	2025 TCR China Challenge
TCR China Touring Car Championship	(China) David Zhu	2025 TCR China Touring Car Championship
TCR China Touring Car Championship	Teams: (China) Teamwork Motorsport	2025 TCR China Touring Car Championship
TCR Denmark Touring Car Series	(Denmark) Malte Ebdrup	2025 TCR Denmark Touring Car Series
TCR Denmark Touring Car Series	Am: (Denmark) René Junker Povlsen	2025 TCR Denmark Touring Car Series
TCR Denmark Touring Car Series	U25: (Denmark) Malte Ebdrup	2025 TCR Denmark Touring Car Series
TCR Eastern Europe Trophy	(Czech Republic) Adam Kout	2025 TCR Eastern Europe Trophy
TCR Eastern Europe Trophy	Teams: (Czech Republic) Janik Motorsport	2025 TCR Eastern Europe Trophy
TCR Europe Touring Car Series	(United Kingdom) Jenson Brickley	2025 TCR Europe Touring Car Series
TCR Europe Touring Car Series	Teams: (Spain) Monlau Motorsport	2025 TCR Europe Touring Car Series
TCR European Endurance Touring Car Series	(Italy) Eric Scalvini (Italy) Salvatore Tavano	2025 TCR European Endurance Touring Car Series
TCR European Endurance Touring Car Series	Teams: (Austria) Wimmer Werk Motorsport	2025 TCR European Endurance Touring Car Series
TCR European Endurance Touring Car Series	Gen 1: (Italy) Eric Scalvini; Gen 1: (Italy) Salvatore Tavano	2025 TCR European Endurance Touring Car Series
TCR European Endurance Touring Car Series	Gen 1 Teams: (Turkey) Team AMS	2025 TCR European Endurance Touring Car Series
TCR European Endurance Touring Car Series	Gen 2: (Turkey) Sinan Çiftçi; Gen 2: (Turkey) Ibrahim Okyay	2025 TCR European Endurance Touring Car Series
TCR European Endurance Touring Car Series	Gen 2 Teams: (Austria) Wimmer Werk Motorsport	2025 TCR European Endurance Touring Car Series
TCR European Endurance Touring Car Series	DSG Cup: (Jamaica) Senna Summerbell	2025 TCR European Endurance Touring Car Series
TCR European Endurance Touring Car Series	Gentlemen: (Turkey) Ibrahim Okyay	2025 TCR European Endurance Touring Car Series
TCR European Endurance Touring Car Series	Junior: (Turkey) Berk Kalpaklıoğlu	2025 TCR European Endurance Touring Car Series
TC France Series	TCR: (Belgium) Giovanni Scamardi	2025 TC France Series
TC France Series	TC: (France) Florian Briché	2025 TC France Series
TC France Series	TCA: (France) Mickaël Boisdur	2025 TC France Series
TC France Series	TCA Light: (France) Karel Eyoum	2025 TC France Series
TC France Series	GT Light: (France) David Chiche	2025 TC France Series
TCR Italy Touring Car Championship	(Canada) Nicolas Taylor	2025 TCR Italy Touring Car Championship
TCR Italy Touring Car Championship	Teams: (Italy) PMA Motorsport	2025 TCR Italy Touring Car Championship
TCR Italy Touring Car Championship	Under 25 Trophy: (Canada) Nicolas Taylor	2025 TCR Italy Touring Car Championship
TCR Italy Touring Car Championship	Masters: (Italy) Denis Babuin	2025 TCR Italy Touring Car Championship
TCR Italy Touring Car Championship	DSG: (Italy) Eric Brigliadori	2025 TCR Italy Touring Car Championship
TCR Mexico Series	(Mexico) Juan Pablo Sierra	2025 TCR Mexico Series
TCR Mexico Series	Teams: (Mexico) RE Motorsport	2025 TCR Mexico Series
TCR Panama Touring Car Championship	(Costa Rica) Emilio Valverde	2025 TCR Panama Touring Car Championship
TCR Panama Touring Car Championship	Teams: (Panama) CHM Motorsports	2025 TCR Panama Touring Car Championship
TCR Spain Touring Car Championship	(Germany) Mike Halder	2025 TCR Spain Touring Car Championship
TCR Spain Touring Car Championship	Teams: (Spain) Monlau Motorsport	2025 TCR Spain Touring Car Championship
TCR Spain Touring Car Championship	Junior: (Spain) Eric Gené	2025 TCR Spain Touring Car Championship
TCR Spain Touring Car Championship	Masters: (Denmark) René Povlsen	2025 TCR Spain Touring Car Championship
TCR UK Touring Car Championship	(United Kingdom) Adam Shepherd	2025 TCR UK Touring Car Championship
TCR UK Touring Car Championship	Teams: (United Kingdom) Capture Motorsport	2025 TCR UK Touring Car Championship
TCR UK Touring Car Championship	Goodyear Diamond Award: (United Kingdom) Mark Smith	2025 TCR UK Touring Car Championship
TCR UK Touring Car Championship	Gen 1: (United Kingdom) Jeff Alden	2025 TCR UK Touring Car Championship

== Truck racing ==
Series	Champion	Refer
British Truck Racing Championship	(United Kingdom) Ryan Smith	2025 British Truck Racing Championship
British Truck Racing Championship	Div 2: (United Kingdom) Jake Evans	2025 British Truck Racing Championship
Copa Truck	(Brazil) Felipe Giaffone	2025 Copa Truck season
Copa Truck	Elite: (Brazil) Pedro Perdoncini	2025 Copa Truck season
Copa Truck	Manufacturers: (Germany) Volkswagen	2025 Copa Truck season
European Truck Racing Championship	(Hungary) Norbert Kiss	2025 European Truck Racing Championship
European Truck Racing Championship	Teams: (Hungary) Révész Racing	2025 European Truck Racing Championship
Stadium Super Trucks	(United States) Max Gordon	2025 Stadium Super Trucks
SuperUtes Series	(Australia) David Sieders	2025 SuperUtes Series
Thailand Super Pickup	(Thailand) Thanaphon Chucharoenpon	2025 Thailand Super Pickup
Thailand Super Pickup	Class A: (Thailand) Thanaphon Chucharoenpon	2025 Thailand Super Pickup
Thailand Super Pickup	Class B: (Thailand) Surachai Phengphong	2025 Thailand Super Pickup
Thailand Super Pickup	Class C: (Thailand) Ittisak Kaewdee	2025 Thailand Super Pickup
