= 2025 D1 Grand Prix series =

25th season of drifting series from Japan

The 2025 Gran Turismo D1 Grand Prix series was the 25th season of D1 Grand Prix (D1GP) professional drifting competition. The competition is organised by Sunpros under Japanese Automobile Federation (JAF) Semi national competition format and recognise as Japan Drift Championship. The championship is contested over 10 rounds starting at Okuibuki Motorpark and concluded at Odaiba. Naoki Nakamura entered as the defending champion but unable to contest the full season due to his commitment in Drift Masters.

Hideyuki Fujino won his third championship driving for Team Toyo Tires Drift who win the Teams' championship. Fujino managed to overturned 19 point deficit in the final round from Koudai Sobagiri who won the solo run championship.

== Schedule ==
Round	Venue	Date
1	Okuibuki Motorpark, Shiga Prefecture	10 May
2	Okuibuki Motorpark, Shiga Prefecture	11 May
3	Tsukuba Circuit, Ibaraki Prefecture	28 June
4	Tsukuba Circuit, Ibaraki Prefecture	29 June
5	Ebisu Circuit, Fukushima Prefecture	27 September
6	Ebisu Circuit, Fukushima Prefecture	28 September
7	(Ōita Prefecture) Autopolis, Oita Prefecture	25 October
8	(Ōita Prefecture) Autopolis, Oita Prefecture	26 October
9	Odaiba, Tokyo Bay	15 November
10	Odaiba, Tokyo Bay	16 November

== Drivers and Teams ==
Teams	Tires	Car	Engine	No	Drivers	Round
Seimi Style Shibatire Drift	Shibatire	Nissan Silvia (S15)	Toyota 2JZ I6	2	(Japan) Seimi Tanaka	All
Uras Racing	Dunlop	Nissan Skyline (R34)	Toyota 2JZ I6	3	(Japan) Keichi Nomura	All
Team Amemiya Matsukiyo MINI GT Shibatire	Shibatire	Mazda RX-7 (FD3S)	Custom 4-Rotor	7	(Japan) Yukio Matsui	All
Vehiql Racing×Valino	Valino	Nissan 180SX (RPS13)	Toyota 2JZ I6	8	(Japan) Takuya Inaoka (R)	All
Team BUZZBREAK Drift	Valino	Nissan Silvia (S15)	Toyota 2JZ I6	9	(Japan) Tetsuya Kume	All
Team BUZZBREAK Drift	Valino	Toyota GR86 (ZN8)	Toyota 2JZ I6	10	(Japan) Hayato Miyoshi	All
Team Buzzbreak	Valino	Toyota Mark II (JZX100)	Toyota 2JZ I6	50	(Japan) Ryo Ishii (R)	All
Team sky FJトラスポ	Yokohama	Nissan Silvia (S15)	Toyota 2JZ I6	15	Yuta Fujiwara (R)	All
Shibata Racing Team	Shibatire	Toyota GR86 (ZN8)	Toyota 2JZ I6	18	(Japan) Tetsuya Hibino	All
Shibata Racing Team	Shibatire	Toyota GR86 (ZN8)	Nissan VR38 V6	31	(Japan) Koudai Sobagiri	All
Repair Create × Result Japan	Shibatire	Toyota GR86 (ZN8)	Toyota 2JZ I6	23	(Japan) Mitsuru Murakami	All
27Works	Shibatire	Nissan Silvia (S15)	Toyota 2JZ I6	27	(Japan) Takeshi Mogi	All
Team TNR Lovca SE System	Antares	Toyota Mark II (JZX100)	Toyota 2JZ I6	30	(Japan) Tetsuro Nakata	All
Cusco Racing	Yokohama	Toyota GR86 (ZN8)	Toyota 2JZ I6	32	(Japan) Koji Tada (R)	All
Cusco Racing	Yokohama	Toyota GR Corolla (CZEA14JH)	Toyota 2JZ I6	52	(Japan) Atsuki Hoshi (R)	All
Hiroshima Toyota Team Droo-P	Dunlop	Toyota GR86 (ZN8)	Toyota 2JZ I6	33	(Japan) Junya Ishikawa	All
Hiroshima Toyota Team Droo-P	Dunlop	Toyota AE85	Toyota 2GR V6	55	(Japan) Kazuya Matsukawa	All
Team Miyaseimitsu	Valino	Nissan Silvia (S15)	Custom 4-Rotor	38	(Japan) Hisashi Saito	TBC
Racing Service Watanabe	Antares	Toyota AE86	Nissan SR20 I4	43	(Japan) Yoshifumi Tadokoro	1-4,7-10
Racing Service Watanabe	Antares	Mazda RX-7 (FC3S)	Mazda 20B 3-Rotor	51	(Japan) Teruyoshi Iwai	All
GP Sports	Valino	Nissan 180SX (RPS13)	Toyota 2JZ I6	56	(Japan) Takahiro Mori	All
Team Toyo Tires Drift -1	Toyo Tires	Toyota GR86 (ZN8)	Toyota 2JZ I6	66	(Japan) Hideyuki Fujino	All
Team Toyo Tires Drift -1	Toyo Tires	Toyota GR86 (ZN8)	Toyota 2JZ I6	88	(Japan) Masato Kawabata	All
Team Toyo Tires Drift -2	Toyo Tires	Toyota GR Corolla (GZEA14)	Toyota 2JZ I6	77	(Japan) Hokuto Matsuyama	All
Team Toyo Tires Drift -2	Toyo Tires	Toyota GR86 (ZN8)	Toyota 2JZ I6	80	(Japan) Yuki Tano	All
Team Toyo Tires Drift -3	Toyo Tires	Toyota GT86 (ZN6)	Nissan VR38 V6	14	(Japan) Shiina Tamaki (R)	All
D-Max Racing Team	Toyo Tires	Nissan Silvia (S15)	Toyota 2JZ I6	70	(Japan) Masashi Yokoi	All
D-Max Racing Team	Toyo Tires	Nissan Silvia (S15)	Toyota 2JZ I6	81	(Japan) Kenshiro Wada (R)	All
Drift Star Racing	Drift Star	Toyota Chaser (JZX100)	Toyota 2JZ I6	75	(Japan) Yumeto Hatanaka	All
Drift Star Racing	Drift Star	Nissan Silvia (S13)	Toyota 2JZ I6	98	(Japan) Masakazu Doi (R)	All
Team Mori	Valino	Nissan Silvia (S13)	Toyota 2JZ I6	76	(Japan) Ryu Nakamura (R)	All
Team Vertex	Shibatire	Lexus RC (XC10)	Toyota 2JZ I6	78	(Japan) Takahiro Ueno	All
Team Vertex	Shibatire	Toyota GR86 (ZN8)	Toyota 2JZ I6	95	(Thailand) Daychapon Toyingcharoen (Pond)	1-4.9-10
Nexzter Drive to Drift Academy	Shibatire	Nissan Silvia (S15)	Toyota 2JZ I6	63	(Thailand) Konpichit Toyingcharoen (Pay)	1-4
Nexzter Drive to Drift Academy	Shibatire	Nissan Silvia (S15)	Toyota 2JZ I6	89	(Thailand) Lattapon Keawchin (Pop)	9-10
Nexzter Drive to Drift Academy	Shibatire	BMW 2 Series (F22)	Nissan VR38 V6	89	(Thailand) Lattapon Keawchin (Pop)	1-4
Valino Team G-Meister	Valino	BMW 3 Series (E92)	Toyota 2JZ I6	79	(Japan) Kojiro Mekuwa	All
Fat Five Racing	Shibatire	Toyota GR Supra (J29/DB)	Toyota 2JZ I6	87	(Japan) Daigo Saito	5-10
Weins Toyota Kanagawa × 俺だっ！Racing	Valino	Toyota GR Supra (J29/DB)	Toyota 2JZ I6	90	(Japan) Mao Yamanaka	All
Hirano Tire ★ Hardcore Rocket Bunny Racing	Habilead	Nissan Silvia (S15)	Toyota 2JZ I6	91	(Japan) Hirotaka Kano	All
Team Valino × N-Style	Valino	Nissan Silvia (S13)	Chevrolet LSX V8	99	(Japan) Naoki Nakamura	1-2
Team Valino × N-Style	Valino	Toyota GR86 (ZN8)	Toyota 2JZ I6	99	(Japan) Naoki Nakamura	5-10

=== Entry Changes ===
- Yuki Tano joined Team Toyo Tires Drift and will debut GR86 built by D-Max.
- 8 Drivers graduated to D1GP from D1 Lights include :
  - Reigning champion, Kenshiro Wada joined Team D-Max Racing replacing Yuki Tano and will partner Masashi Yokoi who announce 2025 as his last year with the team.
  - Runner-up, Koji Tada who will be partnered with former FDJ driver Atsuki Hoshi in Cusco Racing. Tada will drive Toyota GR86 while Hoshi will drive a GR Corolla.
  - Shiina Tamaki join Team Toyo Tires Drift as the fifth member. She will be the only female driver on the series.
  - Masakazu Doi graduated to D1GP replacing Hiroki Vito in Drift Star Racing.
  - Ryo Ishi joined Team Buzzbreak.
  - Ryu Nakamura, son of Naoki Nakamura will drive a Nissan Silvia S13, joined Team Mori after missing 2024 season.
  - Takuya Inaoka will drive a Nissan 180SX.
  - Super GT driver Yuta Fujiwara will drive a Nissan Silvia S15,
- After a year of from competition, 2023 Rookie of the year Tetsuya Kume will be returning and joined Hayato Miyoshi in Team BUZZBREAK.
- Team G-Meister only compete with one car as Koji Yamaguchi decided to take break from competition. Kojiro Mekuwa remain with the team.
- 2023 D1 Lights champion Hisato Yonai will not return for 2025 but planning to return for 2026.
- Pond will be driving a GR86 previously driven by Pop, in turn Pay will drive the S15 instead.
- Both Racing Service Watanabe driver will now ran Antares tires.
- Hirotaka Kano will be the sole driver that ran Habilead tires.
- Naoki Nakamura miss the Tsukuba round due to his commitment in Drift Masters European Championship.
- Daigo Saito miss the Okuibuki and Tsukuba round due to his commitment in Formula Drift.

==== Mid-season Changes ====
- Naoki Nakamura replace his V8 powered S13 with a newly built Toyota GR86 from Ebisu round onwards.
- Kojiro Mekuwa change his car to Koji Yamaguchi's E92 for the remainder of the season. Mekuwa totalled his E92 in Ebisu during practice.
- Lattapon Keawchin (Pop) use Pay's S15 as the latter is not competing for the rest of the season after Tsukuba and Pop's BMW is in Thailand.

== Results and standings ==
=== Round Results ===
Round	Venue	Winner		Report
Round	Venue	Solo Run	Battle	Report
1	Okuibuki	Seimi Tanaka	Kojiro Mekuwa	
2	Okuibuki	Lattapon Keawchin	Kojiro Mekuwa	
3	Tsukuba	Mao Yamanaka	Kojiro Mekuwa	
4	Tsukuba	Mitsuru Murakami	Hokuto Matsuyama	
5	Ebisu	Koudai Sobagiri	Hideyuki Fujino	
6	Ebisu	Hokuto Matsuyama	Koudai Sobagiri	
7	Autopolis	Hideyuki Fujino	Koudai Sobagiri	
8	Autopolis	Koudai Sobagiri	Naoki Nakamura	
9	Odaiba	Hideyuki Fujino	Naoki Nakamura	
10	Odaiba	Tetsuya Hibino	Hideyuki Fujino	

Further Information : 2025 D1 Grand Prix Series Ranking

=== Drivers' championship ===
==== Point system ====
Positions	1st	2nd	3rd	4th	5th	6th	7th	8th	9th	10th	11th	12th	13th	14th	15th	16th
Point	25	21	18	16	13	12	11	10	8	7	6	5	4	3	2	1
Tanso point	4	3	2	1												

Tiebraker is determined by higher points in tanso standings.

Round winner indicated with Bold and solo run winner with Italics

Rank	Driver	Okuibuki		Tsukuba		Ebisu		Autopolis		Odaiba		Total
Rank	Driver	R1	R2	R3	R4	R5	R6	R7	R8	R9	R10	Total
1	Hideyuki Fujino	5	20	10	21	25	12	17	16	17	27	170
2	Koudai Sobagiri	6	16	15	13	25	27	27	17	16	7	169
3	Naoki Nakamura	15	0	-	-	17	21	18	25	27	21	144
4	Kojiro Mekuwa	27	25	25	9	0	0	15	11	18	0	130
5	Masashi Yokoi	12	24	18	18	8	10	9	10	0	1	110
6	Mao Yamanaka	3	13	17	6	7	19	1	7	21	13	107
7	Ryu Nakamura	0	0	0	16	21	4	0	21	6	18	86
8	Masato Kawabata	18	10	2	11	1	13	6	19	0	0	80
9	Tetsuya Hibino	10	0	0	0	5	16	16	0	15	17	79
10	Seimi Tanaka	17	0	9	0	11	0	21	0	9	10	77
11	Mitsuru Murakami	21	8	11	17	0	0	7	0	0	11	75
12	Hokuto Matsuyama	7	0	7	25	3	12	0	0	3	5	62
13	Lattapon Keawchin (Pop)	16	12	0	1	-	-	-	-	10	11	50
14	Junya Ishikawa	0	5	23	0	0	6	0	5	5	4	48
15	Kenshiro Wada	0	12	3	0	10	5	0	0	11	0	41
16	Yuki Tano	8	1	6	10	4	10	0	0	0	0	39
17	Yumeto Hatanaka	0	0	0	0	2	0	11	0	7	16	36
18	Daigo Saito	-	-	-	-	15	2	0	14	0	0	31
19	Takuya Inaoka	0	11	4	11	0	0	2	0	0	2	30
20	Takahiro Ueno	0	6	16	0	0	3		0	1	0	26
21	Koji Tada	0	2	0	0	6		10	1	0	6	25
22	Tetsuya Kume	0	0	0	0	0	11	0	11	0	0	22
23	Yukio Matsui	4	0	0	2	0	0	0	6	0	3	15
24	Shiina Tamaki	0	0	0	0	0	0	0	4	4	0	8
25	Ryo Ishii	0	0	1	0	0	0	5	0	2	0	8
26	Takahiro Mori	0	0	0	4	0	0	4	0	0	0	8
27	Teruyoshi Iwai	0	3	0	5	0	0	0	0	0	0	8
28	Hirotaka Kano	0	0	5	3	0	0	0	0	0	0	8
29	Atsuki Hoshi	0	0	0	0	0	1	0	3	0	0	4
30	Kazuya Matsukawa	0	4	0	0	0	0	0	0		0	4
31	Keiichi Nomura	2	0	0	0	0	0	0	0	0	0	2
32	Daychapon Toyingcharoen (Pond)	1	0	0	0	0	0	0	0	0	0	1

=== Solo run championship ===
Rank.	Driver	RD.1	RD.2	RD.3	RD.4	RD.5	RD.6	RD.7	RD.8	RD.9	RD.10	Total
1	Koudai Sobagiri	8	1	16	14	20	15	15	20	7	10	126
2	Hideyuki Fujino	5	15	6	8	12	6	20	12	20	15	119
3	Masashi Yokoi	14	16	11	13	13	16	14	11	0	1	109
4	Mao Yamanaka	3	12	20	10	11	14	1	10	13	14	108
5	Kojiro Mekuwa	15	13	10	15	0	0	16	16	8	0	93
6	Mitsuru Murakami	10	14	13	20	0	0	12	0	0	16	85
7	Naoki Nakamura	16	0			14	8	13	8	15	8	82
8	Seimi Tanaka	20		14		7		10		14	11	76
9	Masato Kawabata	13	4	2	16	1	13	11	14			7
10	Tetsuya Hibino	6				6	11	7		16	20	66
11	Ryu Nakamura				12	16	7		2	11	13	61
12	Hokuto Matsuyama	11		12	2	3	20			3	6	57
13	Junya Ishikawa		7	15			12		6	10	5	55
14	Lattapon Keawchin (Pop)	7	20		1					4	12	44
15	Kenshiro Wada		11	3		5	10			6		35
16	Daigo Saito					15	4	0	15			34
17	Takuya Inaoka		10	5	11			2			3	31
18	Yuki Tano	12	2	8	3	4	1					30
19	Koji Tada		3			8		4	1		7	23
20	Yumeto Hatanaka					2		6		12	2	22
21	Yukio Matsui	4			4				7		4	19
22	Takahiro Ueno		8	4			5		0	1		18
23	Tetsuya Kume					0	2		13			15
24	Teruyoshi Iwai		5		7							12
25	Hirotaka Kano			7	5							12
26	Ryo Ishii			1				8		2		11
27	Takahiro Mori				6			5				11
28	Shiina Tamaki								5	5		10
29	Atsuki Hoshi						3		4			7
30	Kazuya Matsukawa		6									6
31	Keiichi Nomura	2										2
32	Daychapon Toyingcharoen (Pond)	1										1

=== Team's championship ===
Points scored by the highest finishing driver in each round.

Rank.	Team	RD.1	RD.2	RD.3	RD.4	RD.5	RD.6	RD.7	RD.8	RD.9	RD.10	Total
1	Team TOYO TIRES DRIFT 1	15	15	6	20	26	6	6	15	6	26	141
2	TEAM VALINO × N-STYLE	6				10	20	15	26	26	20	123
3	SHIBATA RACING TEAM	6	10	6	6	20	26	26	6	10	6	122
4	VALINO TEAM G-Champion	26	26	26	3			6	3	15		105
5	TEAM D-MAX RACING	6	20	15	15	6	3	3	6	6	3	83
6	Waynes Toyota Kanagawa x It's Me! Racing	3	6	6	3	3	15	3	3	20	6	68
7	TEAM MORI				10	15	3		20	3	15	66
8	Team TOYO TIRES DRIFT 2	3	3	3	26	3	6			3	3	50
9	SEIMI STYLE SHIBATIRE DRIFT	6		3		6		20		3	6	44
10	Repair Create × Result Japan	20	3	6	6			3			3	41
11	Hiroshima Toyota team DROO-P		3	20			3		3	3	3	35
12	Nexzter drive to drift academy	10	3		3					6	6	28
13	DRIFT STAR Racing					3		6		3	10	22
14	TEAM VERTEX	3	3	10			3		0	3		22
15	CUSCO Racing		3			3	3	6	3		3	21
16	VEHIQL RACING × VALINO		6	3	6			3			3	21
17	FAT FIVE RACING					6	3	0	6			15
18	TEAM Amemiya Matsukiyo MINIGT Shiba Tire	3			3				3		3	12
19	TEAM BUZZBREAK DRIFT					0	6		6			12
20	Team BuzzBreak			3				3		3		9
21	Team TOYO TIRES DRIFT 3								3	3		6
22	GP SPORTS				3			3				6
23	Racing Service Watanabe		3		3							6
24	Hirano Tire ★ Hardcore Rocket Bunny Racing			3	3							6
25	URAS RACING	3										3
