= 2025 Mazda MX-5 Cup Benelux =

Seventh season of the BetCity Mazda MX-5 Cup

The 2025 Betcity Mazda MX-5 Cup was the seventh season since its inauguration in 2019. It began at Circuit Zandvoort 5 April and ended at TT Circuit Assen on 26 October.

== Calendar ==
The schedule was announced on 14 January 2025, featuring 6 rounds across 4 triple & 2 double-header weekends. No races where added in addition to the 2024 calendar.

| Round | Circuit | Date | Event | Notes |
|---|---|---|---|---|
| 1 | Circuit Zandvoort, Netherlands | 5–6 April | Spring Races | Races contested together with the Ford Fiesta Sprint Cup Benelux |
| 2 | Circuit Zolder, Belgium | 17–18 May | New Race Festival | Races contested together with the Ford Fiesta Sprint Cup Benelux |
| 3 | Circuit Zolder, Belgium | 11–13 July | Supercar Madness | Races contested together with the Ford Fiesta Sprint Cup Benelux |
| 4 | TT Circuit Assen, Netherlands | 8–10 August | JACK'S Racing Day | Races contested together with the Ford Fiesta Sprint Cup Benelux |
| 5 | Circuit Zandvoort, Netherlands | 27–28 September | Trophy of the Dunes | Races contested together with the Ford Fiesta Sprint Cup Benelux |
| 6 | TT Circuit Assen, Netherlands | 25–26 October | Supercar Madness Finale Races | |

== Entries ==
| Icon | Class |
|---|---|
| J | Junior Cup driver |
| G | Gold Cup driver |

| Team | No. | Driver | Class | Rounds |
|---|---|---|---|---|
| (Belgium) DDK Motorsports | 5 | (Ukraine) Ivan Yeremenko | | All |
| (Belgium) DDK Motorsports | 27 | (Ukraine) Mihailo Kohan | | All |
| (Belgium) DDK Motorsports | 32 | (Belgium) Delano de Ketele | J | 1-5 |
| (Belgium) DDK Motorsports | 33 | (Luxembourg) Thierry Glaesener | | All |
| (Belgium) DDK Motorsports | 43 | (Belgium) Leon Iserbyt | J | 1, 4 |
| (Belgium) DDK Motorsports | 44 | (Ukraine) Serhii Volobuiev | | All |
| (Netherlands) Dekker Racing | 6 | (Netherlands) Marcel Dekker | | All |
| (Netherlands) Dekker Racing | 17 | (Netherlands) Leon van Verseveld | J | All |
| (Netherlands) Dekker Racing | 19 | (Netherlands) Mats de Veij | J | 3-6 |
| (Belgium) TDB Racing | 7 | (Belgium) Noah Maton | J | 3-5 |
| (Belgium) TDB Racing | 61 | (Belgium) Thibauld Geladé | J | 3-6 |
| (Belgium) TDB Racing | 97 | (Belgium) Tomas de Backer | | 4-6 |
| (Netherlands) Vuik Motorsport | 11 | (Netherlands) Henk Vuik Jr. | J | All |
| (Netherlands) Vuik Motorsport | 12 | (Netherlands) Luuk Vuik | J | 5-6 |
| (Netherlands) Vuik Motorsport | 20 | (Netherlands) Jan Paul van Dongen | | 1-2 |
| (Netherlands) JW Raceservice | 13 | (Belgium) Maxim van Laere | J | 3 |
| (Netherlands) JW Raceservice | 16 | (Netherlands) Xavier van der Schoot | J | All |
| (Netherlands) JW Raceservice | 82 | (Netherlands) Maxim van den Doel | J | 1-5 |
| (Netherlands) MV Motorsport | 18 | (Netherlands) Kelvin Ursem | J | 4 |
| (Netherlands) MV Motorsport | 20 | (Netherlands) Henk Vuik | | 1 |
| (Netherlands) MV Motorsport | 21 | (Netherlands) Sem Karsten | J | 4 |
| (Netherlands) MV Motorsport | 28 | (Netherlands) Mees Houben | J | All |
| (Netherlands) MV Motorsport | 54 | (Netherlands) Jenson de Leeuw | J | 1-2 |
| (Netherlands) MV Motorsport | 65 | (Netherlands) Sam Jongejan | J | 6 |
| (Netherlands) MV Motorsport | 77 | (Netherlands) Robert-Jan van Wijnen | J | 6 |
| (Netherlands) van der Heijden Autosport | 20 | (Netherlands) Jan Paul van Dongen | | 2, 4-6 |
| (Netherlands) van der Heijden Autosport | 47 | (Netherlands) Jeff Hagelen | G | 4 (R1) |
| (Netherlands) van der Heijden Autosport | 47 | (Belgium) Sebas Walraven | G | 4 (R2) |
| (Netherlands) Fontys Motorsport Engineering | 23 | (Netherlands) Chris Schuttert | J | 1-4, 6 |
| (Netherlands) Isolcom by Fontys | 34 | (Netherlands) Wouter Jansen | | All |
| (Netherlands) Ferry Monster Autosport | 62 | (Netherlands) Pim van Riet | | 4-5 |
| (Netherlands) Ferry Monster Autosport | 95 | (Netherlands) Stijn Heere | J | All |
| (Netherlands) Ferry Monster Autosport | 96 | (Netherlands) Jordy van der Eijk | | 1-3 |

== Race results ==
Bold indicates overall winner.

| Round | | Circuit | Pole position | Fastest lap | Winning driver |
|---|---|---|---|---|---|
| 1 | R1 | (Netherlands) Zandvoort | (Netherlands) #23 Fontys Motorsport Engineering | (Netherlands) #96 Ferry Monster Autosport | (Belgium) #32 DDK Motorsport |
| 1 | R1 | (Netherlands) Zandvoort | (Netherlands) Chris Schuttert | (Netherlands) Jordy van der Eijk | (Belgium) Delano De Ketele |
| 1 | R2 | (Netherlands) Zandvoort | (Belgium) #32 DDK Motorsport | (Netherlands) #34 Isolcom by Fontys | (Netherlands) #6 Dekker Racing |
| 1 | R2 | (Netherlands) Zandvoort | (Belgium) Delano De Ketele | (Netherlands) Wouter Jansen | (Netherlands) Marcel Dekker |
| 1 | R3 | (Netherlands) Zandvoort | (Netherlands) #96 Ferry Monster Autosport | (Netherlands) #96 Ferry Monster Autosport | (Netherlands) #96 Ferry Monster Autosport |
| 1 | R3 | (Netherlands) Zandvoort | (Netherlands) Jordy van der Eijk | (Netherlands) Jordy van der Eijk | (Netherlands) Jordy van der Eijk |
| 2 | R1 | (Belgium) Zolder | (Netherlands) #95 Ferry Monster Autosport | (Netherlands) #96 Ferry Monster Autosport | (Netherlands) #6 Dekker Racing |
| 2 | R1 | (Belgium) Zolder | (Netherlands) Stijn Heere | (Netherlands) Jordy van der Eijk | (Netherlands) Marcel Dekker |
| 2 | R2 | (Belgium) Zolder | (Netherlands) #96 Ferry Monster Autosport | (Netherlands) #96 Ferry Monster Autosport | (Netherlands) #6 Dekker Racing |
| 2 | R2 | (Belgium) Zolder | (Netherlands) Jordy van der Eijk | (Netherlands) Jordy van der Eijk | (Netherlands) Marcel Dekker |
| 2 | R3 | (Belgium) Zolder | (Netherlands) #95 Ferry Monster Autosport | (Belgium) #32 DDK Motorsport | (Netherlands) #96 Ferry Monster Autosport |
| 2 | R3 | (Belgium) Zolder | (Netherlands) Stijn Heere | (Belgium) Delano de Ketele | (Netherlands) Jordy van der Eijk |
| 3 | R1 | (Belgium) Zolder | (Netherlands) #82 JW Raceservice | (Belgium) #32 DDK Motorsport | (Netherlands) #17 Dekker Racing |
| 3 | R1 | (Belgium) Zolder | (Netherlands) Maxim van den Doel | (Belgium) Delano de Ketele | (Netherlands) Leon van Verseveld |
| 3 | R2 | (Belgium) Zolder | (Netherlands) #28 MV Motorsport | (Netherlands) #34 Isolcom by Fontys | (Netherlands) #28 MV Motorsport |
| 3 | R2 | (Belgium) Zolder | (Netherlands) Mees Houben | (Netherlands) Wouter Jansen | (Netherlands) Mees Houben |
| 4 | R1 | (Netherlands) Assen | (Netherlands) #11 Vuik Motorsport | (Netherlands) #6 Dekker Racing | (Netherlands) #17 Dekker Racing |
| 4 | R1 | (Netherlands) Assen | (Netherlands) Henk Vuik Jr. | (Netherlands) Marcel Dekker | (Netherlands) Leon van Verseveld |
| 4 | R2 | (Netherlands) Assen | (Netherlands) #6 Dekker Racing | (Belgium) #33 DDK Motorsport | (Netherlands) #6 Dekker Racing |
| 4 | R2 | (Netherlands) Assen | (Netherlands) Marcel Dekker | (Luxembourg) Thierry Glaesener | (Netherlands) Marcel Dekker |
| 5 | R1 | (Netherlands) Zandvoort | (Netherlands) #11 Vuik Motorsport | (Belgium) #33 DDK Motorsport | (Netherlands) #17 Dekker Racing |
| 5 | R1 | (Netherlands) Zandvoort | (Netherlands) Henk Vuik Jr. | (Luxembourg) Thierry Glaesener | (Netherlands) Leon van Verseveld |
| 5 | R2 | (Netherlands) Zandvoort | (Belgium) #32 DDK Motorsport | (Netherlands) #34 Isolcom by Fontys | (Netherlands) #28 MV Motorsport |
| 5 | R2 | (Netherlands) Zandvoort | (Belgium) Delano de Ketele | (Netherlands) Wouter Jansen | (Netherlands) Mees Houben |
| 5 | R3 | (Netherlands) Zandvoort | (Netherlands) #6 Dekker Racing | (Belgium) #32 DDK Motorsport | (Netherlands) #17 Dekker Racing |
| 5 | R3 | (Netherlands) Zandvoort | (Netherlands) Marcel Dekker | (Belgium) Delano de Ketele | (Netherlands) Leon van Verseveld |
| 6 | R1 | (Netherlands) Assen | (Netherlands) #11 Vuik Motorsport | (Netherlands) #34 Isolcom by Fontys | (Netherlands) #34 Isolcom by Fontys |
| 6 | R1 | (Netherlands) Assen | (Netherlands) Henk Vuik Jr. | (Netherlands) Wouter Jansen | (Netherlands) Wouter Jansen |
| 6 | R2 | (Netherlands) Assen | (Netherlands) #28 MV Motorsport | (Belgium) #97 TDB Racing | (Netherlands) #6 Dekker Racing |
| 6 | R2 | (Netherlands) Assen | (Netherlands) Mees Houben | (Belgium) Tomas de Backer | (Netherlands) Marcel Dekker |
| 6 | R3 | (Netherlands) Assen | (Belgium) #97 TDB Racing | (Netherlands) #28 MV Motorsport | (Netherlands) #28 MV Motorsport |
| 6 | R3 | (Netherlands) Assen | (Belgium) Tomas de Backer | (Netherlands) Mees Houben | (Netherlands) Mees Houben |

=== Championship standings ===
| Position | **1st** | **2nd** | **3rd** | **4th** | **5th** | **6th** | **7th** | **8th** | **9th** | **10th** | **11th** | **12th** | **13th** | **14th** | **15th** | **Pole** | **FL** |
| Points | 20 | 17 | 15 | 13 | 11 | 10 | 9 | 8 | 7 | 6 | 5 | 4 | 3 | 2 | 1 | 1 | **1** |

| Pos. | Driver | (Netherlands) ZAN | | | (Belgium) ZOL | | | (Belgium) ZOL | | (Netherlands) ASS | | (Netherlands) ZAN | | | (Netherlands) ASS | | | Points |
Overall
| 1 | (Netherlands) Marcel Dekker | 5 | 1 | 2 | 1 | 1 | 3 | 4 | 2 | **2** | 1 | 14 | 2 | 18 | 4 | 1 | 4 | 237 |
| 2 | (Netherlands) Mees Houben J | 11 | 9 | 3 | RET | 2 | 7 | **2** | 1 | 4 | 2 | 2 | 1 | 2 | **10** | 2 | 1 | 220 |
| 3 | (Netherlands) Leon van Verseveld J | 3 | RET | DNS | 3 | 3 | 4 | 1 | 3 | 1 | 4 | 1 | 3 | 1 | 5 | 3 | 5 | 218 |
| 4 | (Netherlands) Wouter Jansen | 4 | 2 | 10 | 14 | 11 | 8 | 3 | 4 | RET | DNS | 3 | 6 | 4 | 1 | 18 | 3 | 156 |
| 5 | (Luxembourg) Thierry Glaesener | 7 | 5 | 7 | 4 | 6 | 14 | 8 | 8 | 16 | 5 | 6 | 10 | 8 | 6 | 4 | 9 | 137 |
| 6 | (Belgium) Delano de Ketele J | **1** | 3 | 6 | RET | 4 | 2 | 18 | 6 | 6 | 3 | **19** | RET | 3 | | | | 130 |
| 7 | (Netherlands) Stijn Heere J | 12 | 7 | 16 | 6 | 10 | 10 | 5 | 9 | 7 | 6 | 4 | 5 | 16 | 8 | 5 | 6 | 125 |
| 8 | (Netherlands) Jordy van der Eijk | 2 | 4 | 1 | **2** | 7 | 1 | 17 | 7 | | | | | | | | | 110 |
| 9 | (Netherlands) Henk Vuik Jr. J | 10 | 13 | 9 | 10 | 9 | 9 | 14 | 10 | 8 | 17 | 8 | 7 | 5 | 7 | 7 | 8 | 106 |
| 10 | (Belgium) Tomas de Backer | | | | | | | | | 3 | RET | 5 | 4 | 11 | 3 | 11 | 11 | 69 |
| 11 | (Netherlands) Mats de Veij J | | | | | | | 8 | 11 | 9 | 7 | 7 | 15 | 7 | 11 | 6 | 17 | 63 |
| 12 | (Netherlands) Chris Schuttert J | 17 | 6 | 8 | 7 | RET | DNS | 7 | 5 | RET | DNS | | | | 9 | 10 | 7 | 60 |
| 13 | (Netherlands) Maxim van den Doel J | 8 | RET | 5 | 5 | 8 | 6 | 6 | RET | 19 | RET | 19 | RET | DNS | | | | 58 |
| 14 | (Netherlands) Jenson de Leeuw J | 6 | RET | 4 | 8 | 5 | 5 | | | | | | | | | | | 53 |
| 15 | (Ukraine) Mykhailo Kohan | 16 | 10 | 12 | 9 | 12 | RET | 10 | 14 | RET | 18 | 13 | 13 | 13 | 17 | 12 | 18 | 42 |
| 16 | (Belgium) Thibauld Geladé J | | | | | | | 11 | 16 | 14 | RET | 9 | 14 | 9 | 12 | 9 | 10 | 40 |
| 17 | (Netherlands) Xavier van der Schoot J | RET | 15 | 13 | 11 | RET | DNS | 13 | 13 | RET | 11 | 20 | 9 | 11 | 13 | 13 | 12 | 39 |
| 18 | (Netherlands) Henk Vuik Sr. (Netherlands) Jan Paul van Dongen | 13 | 11 | 11 | 12 | 13 | 12 | | | 18 | 12 | 12 | RET | 15 | 19 | 14 | 13 | 38 |
| 19 | (Ukraine) Serhii Volobuiev | 15 | 14 | 15 | 13 | 14 | 13 | 12 | 18 | 15 | 8 | 18 | 19 | 10 | 14 | 15 | 15 | 35 |
| 20 | (Belgium) Noah Maton | | | | | | | RET | 12 | 12 | 9 | 15 | 8 | 6 | | | | 34 |
| 21 | (Ukraine) Ivan Yeremenko | 14 | 12 | 14 | DNS | 15 | 11 | 16 | RET | 17 | 14 | 10 | 12 | 17 | 16 | RET | 14 | 28 |
| 22 | (Netherlands) Sam Jongejan | | | | | | | | | | | | | | 2 | 8 | 2 | 25 |
| 23 | (Netherlands) Pim van Riet | | | | | | | | | 5 | RET | 11 | RET | DNS | | | | 16 |
| 24 | (Belgium) Leon Iserbyt | 9 | 8 | RET | | | | | | RET | DNS | | | | | | | 15 |
| 25 | (Netherlands) Kelvin Ursem | | | | | | | | | 11 | 10 | | | | | | | 11 |
| 26 | (Netherlands) Luuk Vuik | | | | | | | | | | | 18 | 11 | 14 | 18 | 13 | 16 | 10 |
| 27 | (Netherlands) Jeff Hagelen | | | | | | | | | 10 | | | | | | | | 6 |
| 28 | (Netherlands) Sem Karsten | | | | | | | | | 13 | 14 | | | | | | | 5 |
| 29 | (Belgium) Sebas Walraven | | | | | | | | | | 13 | | | | | | | 3 |
| 30 | (Belgium) Maxim Van Laere | | | | | | | 15 | 15 | | | | | | | | | 2 |
| 31 | (Netherlands) Robert-Jan van Wijnen | | | | | | | | | | | | | | 15 | 17 | RET | 1 |
