= Enzo Hallman =

Swedish racing driver (born 2007)

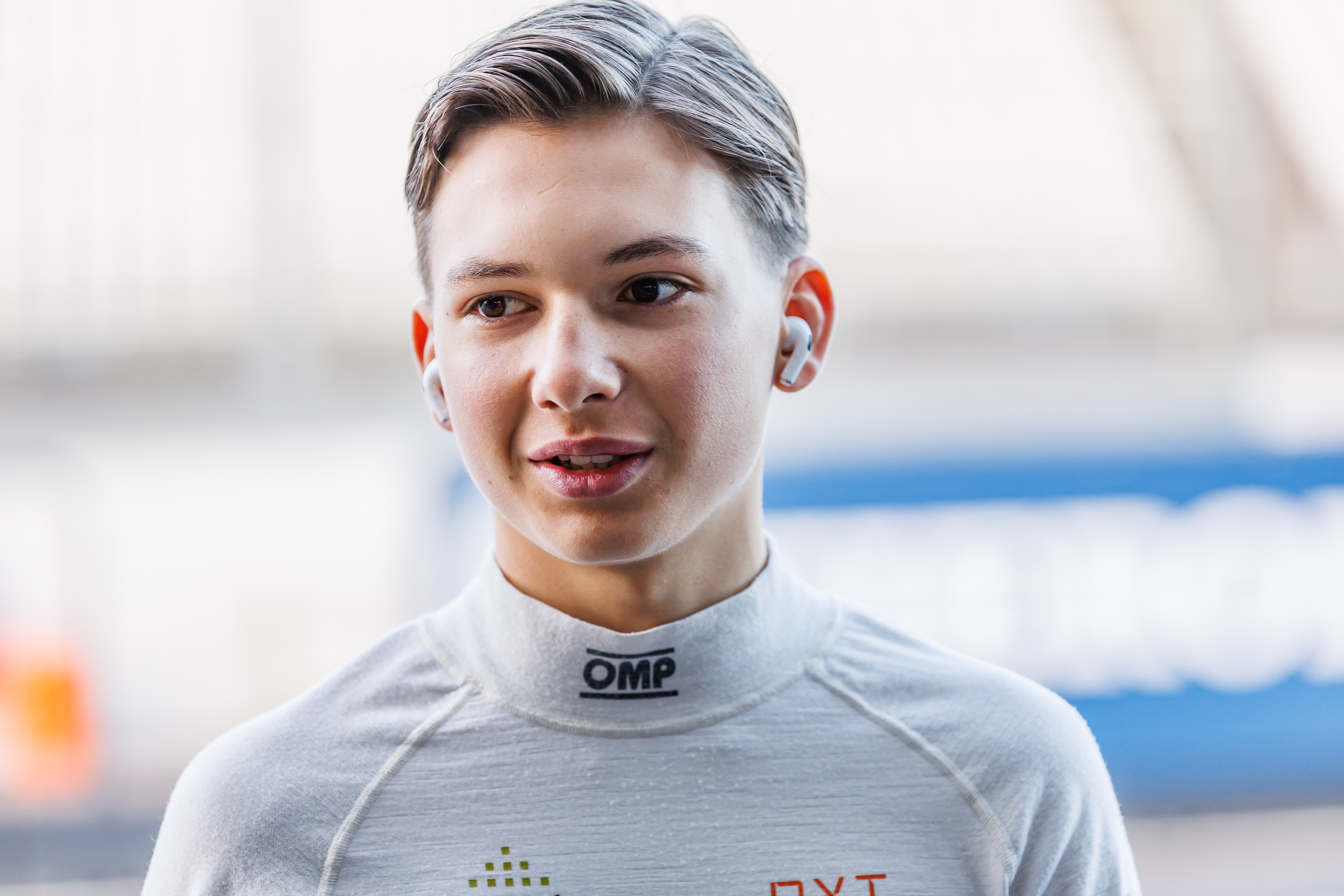
- Hallman in 2024
- Nationality: (Sweden) Swedish
- Born: Enzo Teodor Hallman; 28 November 2007 (age 18) Jönköping, Sweden

GB4 Championship career
- Debut season: 2025
- Current team: Hillspeed
- Car number: 7
- Former teams: Douglas Motorsport
- Starts: 42
- Wins: 1
- Podiums: 8
- Poles: 0
- Fastest laps: 3
- Best finish: 3rd in 2026

Previous series
- 2024 2023–2024: Formula Nordic; NXT Gen Cup

Enzo Teodor Hallman (born 28 November 2007) is a Swedish racing driver who last competed for Hillspeed in the GB4 Championship.

== Career ==
Born in Jönköping, Hallman started karting in 2018. Mainly racing nationally, he most notably won the 2021 Swedish Karting Championship in the Junior 125 class, the same year in which he made his interntational debut in karts by racing in the Andrea Margutti Trophy and IAME Warriors Final.

Stepping up to cars in 2023, Hallman was part of NXT Gen Cup's 18-car grid for the season's inaugural season. In his first season in cars, Hallman scored a best result of second in the season-opening round at Falkenbergs Motorbana and Karlskoga Motorstadion, as he finished fourth in points with four more podiums to his name.

Hallman returned to NXT Gen Cup for his sophomore season. Once again remaining winless, Hallman took eight podiums with a best result of second scored four times, as he ended the year third in points. During 2024, Hallman also competed as a privateer in Formula Nordic. Despite missing the first round of the season, Hallman finished runner-up to Daniel Varverud with one overall win to his name at Ljungbyheds Motorbana, along four more wins among the Formula Nordic entrants in races in conjunction with Nordic 4.

After testing Formula 4 machinery with Fortec Motorsport in late 2024 and winning the Ronnie Peterson Memorial Fund in early 2025, Hallman joined Douglas Motorsport to compete in GB4 for 2025. On his debut round at Donington Park, Hallman finished sixth and eleventh in the first two races before taking his maiden podium in race three by finishing second behind Alex Berg. Having left Donington Park fifth in points, Hallman fell to seventh after finishing no higher than 11th across the three races in the following round at Silverstone. Hallman then took his second podium at Oulton Park by finishing third in race one, before finishing 15th in race two and taking his maiden win in race three after gambling on wet tires. At Snetterton, Hallman finished in the top-ten in all three races with a best result of sixth all weekend, before taking only one top-ten across the following two rounds at Silverstone and Brands Hatch, coming in race two at the former. After that, Hallman finished eighth in race one at Donington Park to end the season ninth in points.

The following year, Hallman returned to GB4 as he switched to Hillspeed for his sophomore season in the series. Hallman began the season with three podiums across the Silverstone and Oulton Park rounds, before he scored further podiums at Snetterton and Donington Park en route to third in overall standings.

== Karting record ==
=== Karting career summary ===
Season	Series	Team	Position
2018	Swedish Karting Championship Invitational — Junior 60		21st
2019	Swedish Karting Championship — Junior 60		24th
2019	Swedish Kart League — Junior 60		18th
2021	Swedish Karting Championship — Junior 125	Jönköpings Karting Club	1st
2021	Sydsvenskans Kart Champion Cup — Junior 125		4th
2021	Andrea Margutti Trophy — X30 Junior	Ward Racing	24th
2021	IAME Warriors Final — X30 Junior	Ward Racing	NC
2022	Swedish Karting Championship — Senior 125		11th
2022	WSK Euro Series — OK	Leclerc By Lennox Racing	41st

== Racing record ==
=== Racing career summary ===
Season	Series	Team	Races	Wins	Poles	F/Laps	Podiums	Points	Position
2023	NXT Gen Cup	Lestrup Racing Team	12	0	0	1	6	193	4th
2024	NXT Gen Cup	Lestrup Racing Team	13	0	0	3	8	265	**3rd**
2024	Formula Nordic	Privateer	13	5	2	3	11	264	**2nd**
2025	GB4 Championship	Douglas Motorsport	21	1	0	0	3	224	9th
2026	GB4 Championship	Hillspeed	21	0	0	3	5	341	**3rd**

=== Complete NXT Gen Cup results ===
(key) (Races in bold indicate pole position) (Races in italics indicate fastest lap)

Year	Team	1	2	3	4	5	6	7	8	9	10	11	12	13	DC	Points
2023	Lestrup Racing Team	FAL; 1; 5	FAL; 2; 2	OSC; 1 Ret	OSC; 2; 8	NÜR; 1; 3^{2}	NÜR; 2; 8	KAR; 1; 3^{2}	KAR; 2; 2	KNU; 1; 6	KNU; 2; 3	MAN; 1; 3^{2}	MAN; 2; 8		4th	193
2024	Lestrup Racing Team	NOR; 1; 3	NOR; 2; 4	NOR; 3; 4	NOR; 4; 3	NÜR; 1; 2	NÜR; 2; 5	NÜR; 3; 2	SAC; 1; 2	SAC; 2; 9	SAC; 3; 3	SAC; 4; 3	HOC; 3; 2	HOC; 1; 3	3rd	265

=== Complete Formula Nordic results ===
(key) (Races in bold indicate pole position) (Races in italics indicate fastest lap)

Year	Team	1	2	3	4	5	6	7	8	9	10	11	12	13	14	15	DC	Points
2024	Privateer	FAL; 1	FAL; 2	KAR; 1; 9	KAR; 2; 11	KAR; 3; 12	**LJU**; **1**; 1^{1}	LJU; 2; 5	**FAL**; **1**; 6^{1}	FAL; 2; 8	FAL; 3; 8	RUD; 1; 2^{3}	RUD; 2; 2	JYL; 1; 7^{5}	JYL; 2; 8	JYL; 3; 9	2nd	264

=== Complete GB4 Championship results ===
(key) (Races in bold indicate pole position) (Races in italics indicate fastest lap)

Year	Entrant	1	2	3	4	5	6	7	8	9	10	11	12	13	14	15	16	17	18	19	20	21	22	DC	Points
2025	Douglas Motorsport	DON; 1; 6	DON; 2; 11	DON; 3; 2^{2}	SIL1; 1; 18	SIL1; 2; 12	SIL1; 3; 11^{5}	OUL; 1; 3	OUL; 2; 15	OUL; 3; 1^{12}	SNE; 1; 8	SNE; 2; 8	SNE; 3; 6	SIL2; 1; 12	SIL2; 2; 9	SIL2; 3; 14	BRH; 1; 12	BRH; 2; 12	BRH; 3 C	DON2; 1; 8	DON2; 2; 22	DON2; 3; 22	DON2; 4; 13^{1}	9th	224
2026	Hillspeed	SIL1; 1; 7	SIL1; 2; 2	SIL1; 3; 5^{5}	OUL; 1; 3	OUL; 2; 3	OUL; 3; 6^{4}	DON1; 1; 8	DON1; 2; 11	DON1; 3; 5^{12}	SIL2; 1; 11	SIL2; 2; 12	SIL2; 3; 16	SNE; 1; 10	SNE; 2; 8	SNE; 3; 2^{4}	DON2; 1; 4	DON2; 2; 3	DON2; 3; 12	BRH; 1; 4	BRH; 2; 4	BRH; 3; 4^{5}		3rd	341
