= Patricija Stalidzane =

Latvian racing driver

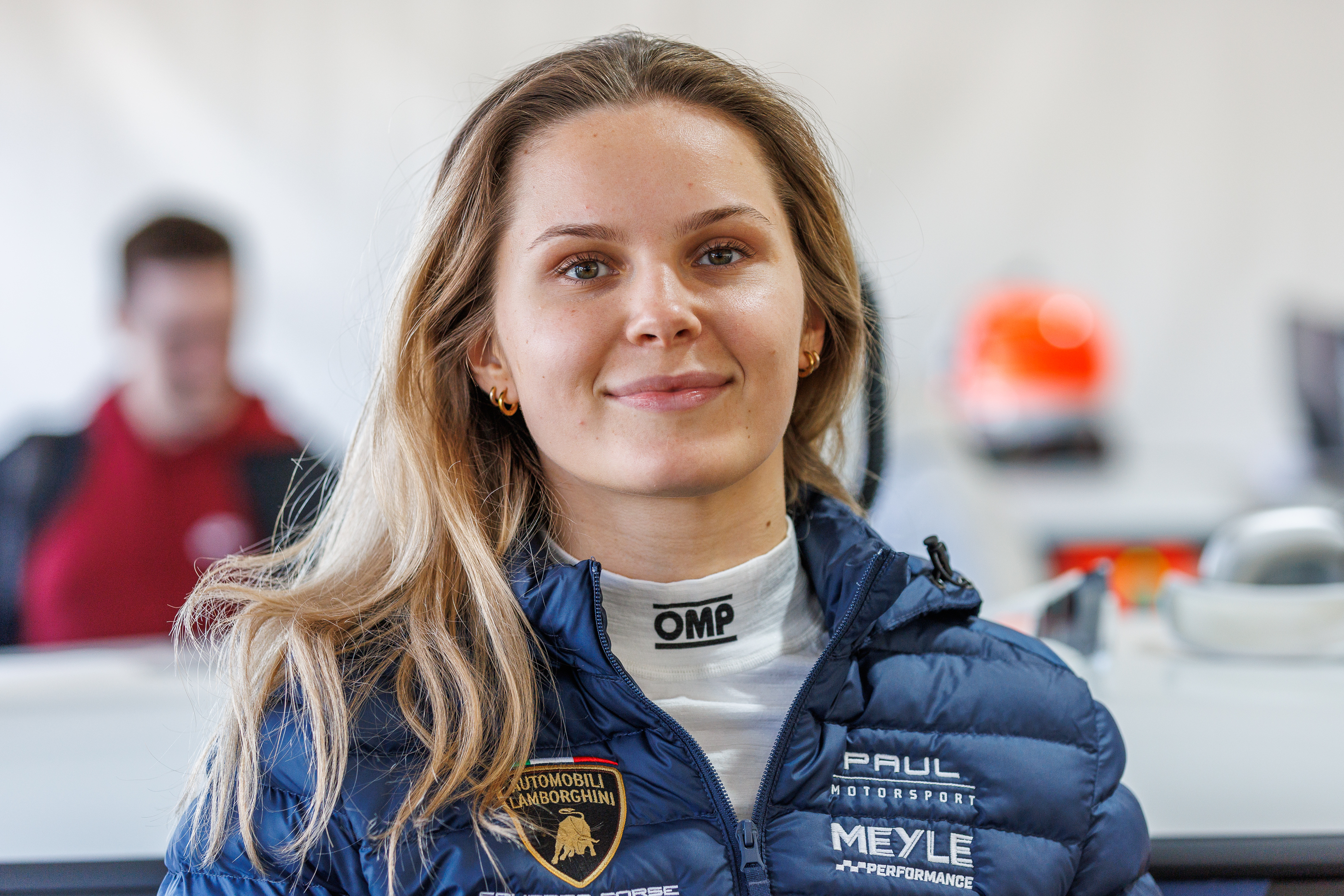
- Stalidzane in 2025
- Nationality: (Latvia) Latvian (Germany) German
- Born: Patrīcija Keita Stalidzāne; 17 April 2002 (age 24) Riga, Latvia

ADAC GT4 Germany
- Categorisation: FIA Silver
- Years active: 2019–2020
- Teams: racing one Dörr Motorsport
- Starts: 14
- Wins: 0
- Poles: 0
- Fastest laps: 0
- Best finish: 21st in 2019

Previous series
- 2018 2019–2020 2024–2025 2024–2025: Renault Clio Cup Central Europe; ADAC GT4 Germany; NXT Gen Cup; Nürburgring Langstrecken-Serie

Patrīcija Keita Stalidzāne (born 17 April 2002) is a Latvian and German racing driver.

== Biography ==
Born in Latvia to a family with a history in rallying, Stalidzane moved to Germany at 8 to participate in karting. Using her Latvian roots to find a licensing grey area, she made her car racing debut at 15 in Renault Clio Cup before moving up to ADAC GT4 Germany in 2019. Having scored a podium in the final round at Hockenheim, Stalidzane stayed in the series for 2020 before losing a major sponsor due to COVID-19 and only completed a handful of races as a result.

Stalidzane made sporadic appearances in the BMW M2 Cup Germany thereafter before joining WS Racing's "Girls Only" Nürburgring project in 2024, making her first start in the Nürburgring 24 Hours the following year. The Latvian twinned this with participation in the electric NXT Gen Cup, becoming the first female driver to take a podium finish in the championship at the Sachsenring.

Stalidzane is in a relationship with Lamborghini factory driver Maximilian Paul. In 2025, Stalidzane tested Paul's DTM car, a Lamborghini Huracán GT3 Evo, at Paul Ricard. She made her formal GT3 debut in 2026, joining Konrad Motorsport in the NLS and the 24 Hours of Nürburgring, as the only female driver in the SP9 class. Stalidzane, who shared the No. 7 Lamborghini with Christian Engelhart, Pavel Lefterov and Paul, retired from the N24 and finished third in the NLS standings.

== Racing record ==
=== Career summary ===
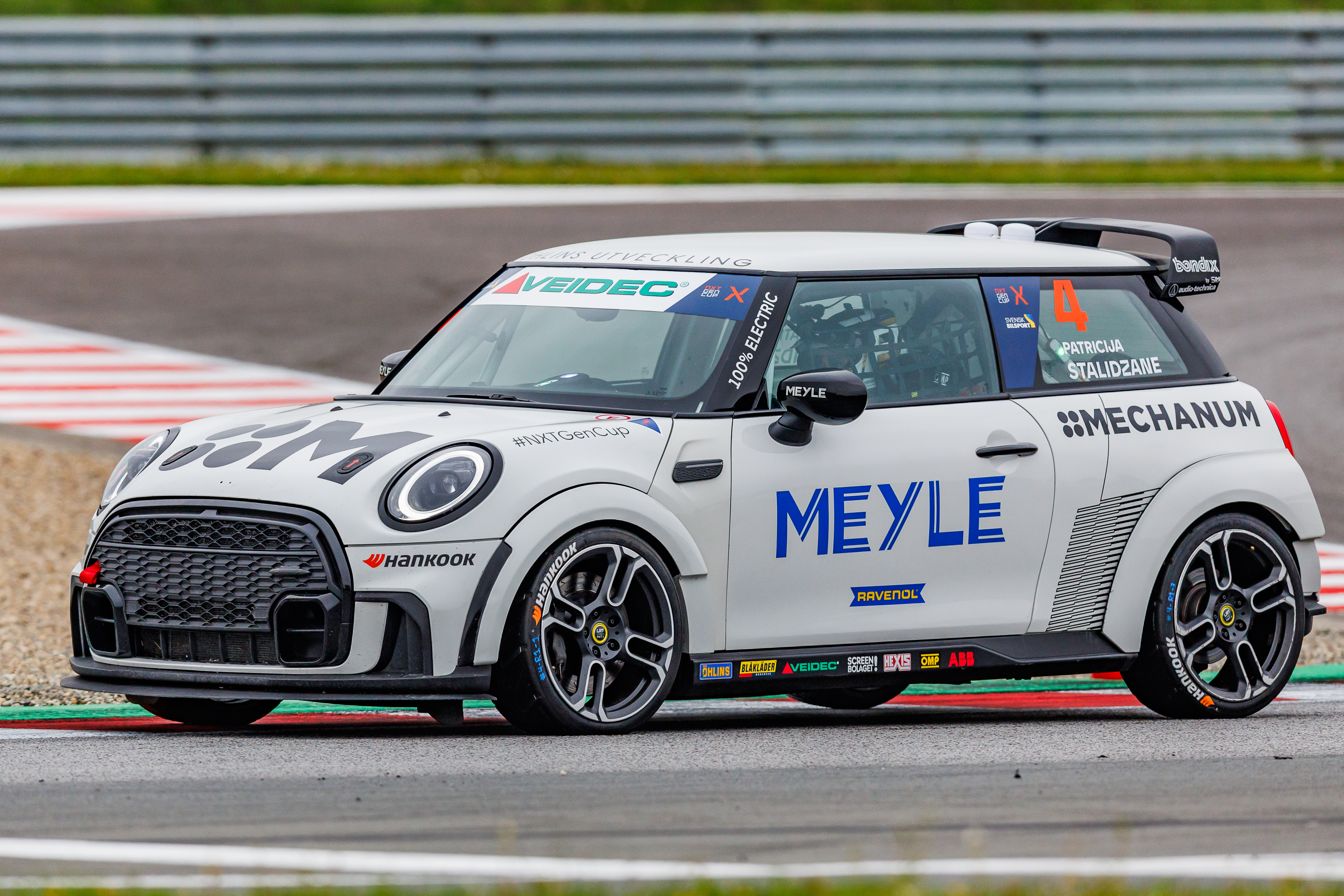
Stalidzane competing in NXT Gen Cup.

Season	Series	Team	Races	Wins	Poles	F/Lpaps	Podiums	Points	Position
2018	Renault Clio Cup Central Europe	FSR Performance	6	0	0	0	0	15	34th
2019	ADAC GT4 Germany	racing one	10	0	0	0	1	33	21st
2020	ADAC GT4 Germany	Dörr Motorsport	4	0	0	0	0	9	25th
2024	Nürburgring Langstrecken-Serie - VT2-R	Giti Tire Motorsport by WS Racing	2	0	0	0	1	?	?
2024	Nürburgring Langstrecken-Serie - SP8T	Giti Tire Motorsport by WS Racing	4	1	0	0	3	?	?
2024	NXT Gen Cup		13	0	0	1	1	170	5th
2025	NXT Gen Cup		13	1	2	3	6	225	4th
2025	Nürburgring Langstrecken-Serie - AT3	Giti Tire Motorsport by WS Racing	3	3	0	0	3	?	?
2025	Nürburgring Langstrecken-Serie - SP8T	Giti Tire Motorsport by WS Racing	1	0	0	0	1	?	?
2025	24 Hours of Nürburgring - AT3	Giti Tire Motorsport by WS Racing	1	0	0	0	0	N/A	4th
2026	Nürburgring Langstrecken-Serie - SP9	Konrad Motorsport	3	0	0	0	0	3	3rd
2026	24 Hours of Nürburgring - SP9	Konrad Motorsport	1	0	0	0	0	N/A	DNF
2026	Nürburgring Langstrecken-Serie - AT2	Giti Tire Motorsport by WS Racing							
2026	Italian GT Championship Sprint Cup - GT3	Oregon Team	2	0	0	0	0	0	NC†

=== 24 Hours of Nürburgring results ===
Year	Team	Co-Drivers	Car	Class	Laps	Ovr. Pos.	Class Pos.
2025	(Germany) WS Racing	(Germany) Janina Schall (Germany) Carrie Schreiner (Liechtenstein) Fabienne Wohlwend	BMW M4 (G82) GT4	AT3	104	66th	4th
2026	(Austria) Konrad Motorsport	(Germany) Christian Engelhart (Bulgaria) Pavel Lefterov (Germany) Maximilian Paul	Lamborghini Huracán GT3 Evo2	SP9; Pro	69	DNF	DNF
