= Alexia Danielsson =

Swedish racing driver (born 2009)

- Nationality: (Sweden) Swedish
- Born: 18 March 2009 (age 17) Storvreta, Sweden
- Relatives: Alx Danielsson (father)

Formula 4 CEZ Championship career
- Debut season: 2026
- Current team: STEP Motorsport
- Car number: 61
- Starts: 11
- Wins: 0
- Podiums: 0
- Poles: 0
- Fastest laps: 0
- Best finish: 31st in 2026

Previous series
- 2024–2025 2022–2024: Nordic 4 Championship; Aquila Formula 1000 Sweden

Alexia Danielsson (born 18 March 2009) is a Swedish racing driver who last competed in the Formula 4 CEZ Championship for STEP Motorsport.

== Personal life ==
Danielsson is the daughter of Swedish racing driver Alx Danielsson, the 2006 Formula Renault 3.5 Series champion and a test driver for Renault in Formula One.

== Career ==
Danielsson began karting at the age of six, competing until 2021, when she received special dispensation to drive single-seaters at the age of 12. Racing primarily in Sweden during her karting career, Danielsson was runner-up in the Micro and Mini classes of the MKR Serien in 2019 and 2021 respectively. Also in 2021, Danielsson was part of the FIA Girls on Track – Rising Stars junior shootout.

Moving up to single-seaters in 2022, Danielsson began racing in Aquila Formula 1000 Sweden, taking a best result of seventh at Gelleråsen to end the year seventh overall. Continuing in the series for 2023, Danielsson achieved her first pole position and podium at Mittsverigebanan, which helped her end the season in seventh for the second consecutive year. That year, aged 14, Danielsson also drove a Formula One car for the first time, testing a 2007 Williams FW29 owned by family friend Johan Rajamäki at Anderstorp Raceway.

Remaining in Aquila Formula 1000 Sweden for a third season in 2024, Danielsson took her only podium of the season at Kinnekulle to once again end the season seventh. In parallel, she also competed for FSP in the Nordic 4 Championship, taking a best result of fifth at Padborg Park, but suffered a rollover crash at the second Jyllands-Ringen round which forced her to skip the finale. In 2025, Danielsson remained with FSP for a second season in Nordic 4. She took a shock win at Karlskoga in the combined Nordic championship, but only managed a best result of fourth twice in the Danish championship to end the season ninth overall. That year, Danielsson also made one-off appearances in Porsche Sprint Challenge Scandinavia and Portugal, as part of the brand's Race Apprentice 2025 initiative, winning on debut in the former at Anderstorp. Towards the end of the year, Danielsson took part in F1 Academy's rookie test at Navarra, placing sixth in both sessions.

In 2026, Danielsson moved to STEP Motorsport to compete in the Formula 4 CEZ Championship, as well as joining David Coulthard's More Than Equal programme. In her rookie season in the series, Danielsson took a best result of sixth at Most to end the year 31st overall. During the year, Danielsson returned to the F1 Academy rookie test at Navarra as a McLaren nominee, topping the afternoon session ahead of a wildcard appearance in the series' Circuit of the Americas round for Hitech, with support from TeamViewer.

== Karting record ==
=== Karting career summary ===
Season	Series	Team	Position
2017	MKR Serien — Micro		33rd
2019	MKR Serien — Micro		2nd
2019	SMK Västerås Höstrusket — Micro		4th
2020	MKR Serien — Mini		4th
2021	MKR Serien — Mini		2nd
2021	Sydsvenskans Kart Champion Cup		10th

== Racing record ==
=== Racing career summary ===
Season	Series	Team	Races	Wins	Poles	F/Laps	Podiums	Points	Position
2022	Aquila Formula 1000 Sweden		18	0	0	0	0	232	7th
2023	Aquila Formula 1000 Sweden		24	0	1	0	1	438	7th
2024	Nordic 4 Championship	FSP	20	0	0	0	0	45	10th
2024	Formula Nordic	FSP	8	0	0	0	0	0	NC†
2024	Aquila Formula 1000 Sweden		15	0	1	0	1	379	7th
2025	Nordic 4 Championship	FSP	14	0	0	0	0	56	9th
2025	Nordic Championship Formula	FSP	13	1	0	0	1	56	18th
2025	Porsche Sprint Challenge Scandinavia	Porsche Experience Racing	2	1	0	0	1	39	14th
2026	Formula 4 CEZ Championship	STEP Motorsport	11	0	0	0	0	16	31st
2026	F1 Academy	Hitech	2	0	0	0	0	0	22nd

^{†} As Danielsson was a guest driver, she was ineligible to score points.
* Season still in progress.

=== Complete Nordic 4 Championship results ===
(key) (Races in bold indicate pole position) (Races in italics indicate fastest lap)

Year	Team	1	2	3	4	5	6	7	8	9	10	11	12	13	14	15	16	17	18	19	20	21	DC	Points
2024	FSP	PAD1; 1; 12	PAD1; 2; 10	PAD1; 3; 11	JYL1; 1; 12	JYL1; 2; 13	JYL1; 3; 9	KAR; 1; 8	KAR; 2; 10	KAR; 3; 7	DJU; 1; 9	DJU; 2 Ret	DJU; 3 Ret	FAL; 1; 12	FAL; 2 Ret	FAL; 3; 13	PAD2; 1; 8	PAD2; 2; 5	PAD2; 3; 8	JYL2; 1; 20	JYL2; 2 Ret	JYL2; 3 DNS	10th	45
2025	FSP	PAD1; 1; 6	PAD1; 2; 6	PAD1; 3; 6	AND; 1 WD	AND; 2 WD	AND; 3 WD	DJU; 1; 7	DJU; 2; 4	DJU; 3; 7	JYL1; 1 Ret	JYL1; 2; 4	JYL1; 3 Ret	PAD2; 1; 11	PAD2; 2; 12	PAD2; 3 Ret	JYL2; 1 DNS	JYL2; 2; 11	JYL2; 3; 9				9th	56

=== Complete Formula 4 CEZ Championship results ===
(key) (Races in bold indicate pole position) (Races in italics indicate fastest lap)

Year	Team	1	2	3	4	5	6	7	8	9	10	11	12	13	14	15	16	17	18	19	20	21	22	23	24	DC	Points
2026	STEP Motorsport	RBR1; 1	RBR1; 2; 17	RBR1; 3; 13	RBR1; 4; 15	SAL; 1; 19	SAL; 2	SAL; 3; 22	SAL; 4 C	SVK; 1	SVK; 2 Ret	SVK; 3; 15	SVK; 4; 15	MOS; 1	MOS; 2; 6	MOS; 3; 21	MOS; 4 Ret	BRN; 1	BRN; 2	BRN; 3	BRN; 4	HUN; 1	HUN; 2	HUN; 3	HUN; 4	31st	16

* Season still in progress.

=== Complete F1 Academy results ===
(key) (Races in bold indicate pole position; races in italics indicate points for the fastest lap of the points finishers)

Year	Entrant	1	2	3	4	5	6	7	8	9	10	11	12	13	14	Pos	Points
2026	Hitech	SHA; 1	SHA; 2	MTL; 1	MTL; 2	MTL; 3	SIL; 1	SIL; 2	ZAN; 1	ZAN; 2	COA; 1; 15	COA; 2 Ret	COA; 3 WD	LVG; 1	LVG; 2	21st*	0*

* Season still in progress.
