= 2024 Formula Nordic =

Motor racing championship held in 2024

The 2024 Formula Nordic season was the twelfth season of the Swedish-based single-seater championship, and the sixth independent of the STCC branding, following the STCC promoter's bankruptcy in 2018. The series continued to use the Formula Renault 1.6 chassis and engines, with Yokohama as the series' tyre supplier.

The season began on 3 May at Anderstorp Raceway, and concluded on 29 September at Jyllands-Ringen after fifteen races held over six rounds. Daniel Varverud was crowned champion with seven wins across the fifteen races.

== Drivers and teams ==
In rounds 2, 4 and 6, the Formula Nordic grid was combined with entries from the 2024 Nordic 4 Championship.

Team	No.	Drivers	Rounds
Privateer	7	(Sweden) Enzo Hallman	2–6
Privateer	18	(Greece) Joannis Matentzoglou (Note: Matentzoglou is a privateer who purchased his car from NIKA Racing.)	1–3
Privateer	23	(Sweden) Albin Stureson	1–4, 6
Privateer	70	(Sweden) Daniel Varverud	All
(Denmark) Philip Engbæk Racing	10	(Denmark) Philip Engbæk	3–4
(Norway) RPC Motorsport	40	(Norway) Birk August Larsen	2–4
(Norway) RPC Motorsport	51	(United Kingdom) Flame Airikkala	2
(Norway) Saltvedt Racing	48	(Norway) Peder Saltvedt	All
(Sweden) Granforce Racing	61	(Sweden) Robin Hafström	All
(Sweden) Aichhorn Racing	87	(Sweden) Andreas Aichhorn	1–5
(Sweden) Project F1	88	(Sweden) Viktor Molander	All
Nordic 4 Championship entries
(Denmark) FSP	8	(Denmark) Louis Leveau	2, 4, 6
(Denmark) FSP	15	(Denmark) Marius Kristiansen	2, 4, 6
(Denmark) FSP	61	(Sweden) Alexia Danielsson	2, 4, 6
(Denmark) MP Racing	12	(Denmark) Magnus Pedersen	2, 4, 6
(Denmark) STEP Motorsport	13	(Denmark) Lærke Rønn Sørensen	2, 4, 6
(Denmark) STEP Motorsport	21	(Denmark) Mathias Bjerre Jakobsen	2, 4, 6
(Denmark) STEP Motorsport	38	(Denmark) Sebastian Schou	6
(Denmark) STEP Motorsport	77	(Poland) Gustaw Wiśniewski	4, 6
(Denmark) STEP Motorsport	88	(Denmark) Sebastian Bach	2, 4, 6
(Denmark) RaceCraft Driver Academy	10	(Denmark) Michella Rasmussen	2
(Denmark) RaceCraft Driver Academy	10	(Denmark) Carl Pramming	6
Formula 5 entries
(Denmark) Leerskov Racing	4	(Denmark) Jørgen Leerskov	2, 4, 6
(Denmark) Mads Hoe Motorsport	16	(Denmark) Mads Kjelde Larsen	2, 4, 6
(Denmark) Mads Hoe Motorsport	47	(Denmark) Mads Hoe	2, 4, 6
(Denmark) Mads Hoe Motorsport	56	(Denmark) Mille Hoe	2, 4, 6
(Denmark) Sønderskov Motorsport	39	(Denmark) Line Sønderskov	6
(Denmark) Rytteriet	49	(Denmark) Niels Ejnar Rytter	2, 4, 6
(Denmark) MT Motorsport	222	(Denmark) Marcus Terkildsen	6

== Race calendar and results ==
The season was held over six rounds, beginning at Anderstorp Raceway and concluding at Jyllands-Ringen. Ljungbyheds Motorbana and Falkenbergs Motorbana featured on the calendar for the first time. The rounds at Karlskoga, Falkenberg and Jyllands-Ringen were held as combined grids with the Nordic 4 Championship and were triple-header rounds, whereas the remaining stand-alone rounds had two races each.

Round		Circuit	Date	Pole position	Fastest lap	Winning driver	Winning team
1	R1	(Sweden) Anderstorp Raceway, Anderstorp	4 May	(Sweden) Albin Stureson	(Sweden) Albin Stureson	(Sweden) Daniel Varverud	Privateer
1	R2	(Sweden) Anderstorp Raceway, Anderstorp	4 May		(Sweden) Daniel Varverud	(Sweden) Daniel Varverud	Privateer
2	R1	(Sweden) Gelleråsen Arena, Karlskoga	1 June	(Sweden) Daniel Varverud	(Sweden) Daniel Varverud	(Sweden) Daniel Varverud	Privateer
2	R2	(Sweden) Gelleråsen Arena, Karlskoga	2 June		(Sweden) Daniel Varverud	(Sweden) Albin Stureson	Privateer
2	R3	(Sweden) Gelleråsen Arena, Karlskoga	2 June		(Sweden) Daniel Varverud	(Sweden) Daniel Varverud	Privateer
3	R1	(Sweden) Ljungbyheds Motorbana, Ljungbyhed	29 June	(Sweden) Enzo Hallman	(Sweden) Daniel Varverud	(Sweden) Enzo Hallman	Privateer
3	R2	(Sweden) Ljungbyheds Motorbana, Ljungbyhed	29 June		(Sweden) Enzo Hallman	(Sweden) Daniel Varverud	Privateer
4	R1	(Sweden) Falkenbergs Motorbana, Bergagård	13–14 July	(Sweden) Enzo Hallman	(Sweden) Albin Stureson	(Sweden) Enzo Hallman	Privateer
4	R2	(Sweden) Falkenbergs Motorbana, Bergagård	13–14 July		(Sweden) Daniel Varverud	(Sweden) Daniel Varverud	Privateer
4	R3	(Sweden) Falkenbergs Motorbana, Bergagård	13–14 July		(Sweden) Enzo Hallman	(Sweden) Enzo Hallman	Privateer
5	R1	(Norway) Rudskogen Motorsenter, Rakkestad	10–11 August	(Sweden) Daniel Varverud	(Sweden) Daniel Varverud	(Sweden) Daniel Varverud	Privateer
5	R2	(Norway) Rudskogen Motorsenter, Rakkestad	10–11 August		(Sweden) Daniel Varverud	(Sweden) Daniel Varverud	Privateer
6	R1	(Denmark) Jyllands-Ringen, Silkeborg	28–29 September	(Norway) Peter Saltvedt	(Sweden) Enzo Hallman	(Sweden) Enzo Hallman	Privateer
6	R2	(Denmark) Jyllands-Ringen, Silkeborg	28–29 September		(Sweden) Daniel Varverud	(Sweden) Enzo Hallman	Privateer
6	R3	(Denmark) Jyllands-Ringen, Silkeborg	28–29 September		(Norway) Peter Saltvedt	(Norway) Peter Saltvedt	(Norway) Saltvedt Racing

== Championship standings ==
Qualifying points system

Points were awarded to the top 5 fastest qualifying times.

Position	**1st**	**2nd**	**3rd**	**4th**	**5th**
Points	5	4	3	2	1

Race points system

Points were awarded to the top 10 classified finishers; no points were offered for fastest lap. The worst result for each driver was dropped from the final standings.

Position	**1st**	**2nd**	**3rd**	**4th**	**5th**	**6th**	**7th**	**8th**	**9th**	**10th**
Points	25	18	15	12	10	8	6	4	2	1

=== Drivers' Championship ===
Pos	Driver	AND (Sweden)		KAR (Sweden)			LJU (Sweden)		FAL (Sweden)			RUD (Norway)		JYL (Denmark)			Pts
1	(Sweden) Daniel Varverud	1^{2}	1	Ret^{1}	9	6	2^{3}	1	9^{2}	7	10	**1**^{1}	1	9^{3}	Ret	12	298
2	(Sweden) Enzo Hallman			9	11	12	**1**^{1}	5	**6**^{1}	8	8	2^{3}	2	7^{5}	8	9	264
3	(Norway) Peder Saltvedt	2^{3}	3	Ret	12	13	4^{5}	2	13^{3}	9	15	4^{4}	3	**8**^{1}	10	6	225
4	(Sweden) Robin Hafström	3^{4}	2	7^{3}	21	8	5	4	15	10	14	3^{2}	4	15^{4}	14	15	198
5	(Sweden) Albin Stureson	**Ret**^{1}	Ret	6^{2}	8	11	3^{4}	3	8^{4}	12	DNS			12^{2}	9	14	182
6	(Sweden) Andreas Aichhorn	4^{5}	Ret	12	15	19	6	6	16^{5}	DNS	19	5^{5}	5				91
7	(Sweden) Viktor Molander	6	5	Ret	20	20	8	9	21	DNS	18	6†	6	Ret	19	19	74
8	(Greece) Joannis Matentzoglou	5	4	Ret	17	16	9	DNS									38
9	(Norway) Birk August Larsen			Ret	14	DNS	Ret^{2}	7	17	Ret	DNS						26
10	(Denmark) Philip Engbæk						7	8	18	Ret	DNS						14
11	(United Kingdom) Flame Airikkala			DSQ	18	17											10
Nordic 4 Championship entries
–	(Denmark) Mathias Bjerre Jakobsen			1	1	1			1	1	1			1	4	1	–
–	(Poland) Gustaw Wiśniewski								5	3	2			6	1	Ret	–
–	(Denmark) Marius Kristiansen			4	3	21†			2	5	4			4	3	2	–
–	(Denmark) Mads Hoe			2	Ret	2			10	4	6			3	6	3	–
–	(Denmark) Sebastian Bach			5	5	4			7	2	3			5	2	4	–
–	(Denmark) Magnus Pedersen			16†	4	3			3	14	5			2	5	5	–
–	(Denmark) Louis Leveau			3	2	Ret			4	Ret	7			Ret	11	10	–
–	(Denmark) Lærke Rønn Sørensen			11	7	5			11	13	9			14	7	7	–
–	(Denmark) Mads Kjelde Larsen			10	6	10			14	6	11			11	12	11	–
–	(Sweden) Alexia Danielsson			8	10	7			12	Ret	13			Ret	Ret	DNS	–
–	(Denmark) Sebastian Schou													13	15	8	–
–	(Denmark) Mille Hoe			13	13	9			19	11	12			WD	WD	WD	–
–	(Denmark) Carl Pramming													10	13	13	–
–	(Denmark) Michella Rasmussen			13	Ret	18											–
–	(Denmark) Jørgen Leerskov			14	Ret	15			Ret	15	16			17	16	16	–
–	(Denmark) Niels Ejnar Rytter			15	16	14			20	16	17			18	18	18	–
–	(Denmark) Line Sønderskov													16	17	17	–
Pos	Driver	AND (Sweden)		KAR (Sweden)			LJU (Sweden)		FAL (Sweden)			RUD (Norway)		JYL (Denmark)			Pts

Colour	Result
Gold	Winner
Silver	Second place
Bronze	Third place
Green	Points classification
Blue	Non-points classification
Blue	Non-classified finish (NC)
Purple	Retired, not classified (Ret)
Red	Did not qualify (DNQ)
Red	Did not pre-qualify (DNPQ)
Black	Disqualified (DSQ)
White	Did not start (DNS)
White	Withdrew (WD)
White	Race cancelled (C)
Blank	Did not practice (DNP)
Blank	Did not arrive (DNA)
Blank	Excluded (EX)

**Bold** – Pole
Italics – Fastest Lap
Superscript – Points-scoring qualifying position

† – Driver did not finish the race, but was classified as they completed over 75% of the race distance.
