= 2023 NXT Gen Cup season =

The 2023 NXT Gen Cup was the first season of NXT Gen Cup, world’s first fully electric junior touring car cup. It began at Falkenbergs Motorbana on 7 July and ended at Mantorp Park on 23 September.

== Calendar ==
Round	Circuit	Date	Supporting
1	Falkenbergs Motorbana, Bergagård, Sweden	7–9 July	TCR Denmark Touring Car Series; V8 Thunder Cars
2	Motorsport Arena Oschersleben, Oschersleben, Germany	28–30 July	ADAC Racing Weekend Oschersleben
3	Nürburgring, Nürburg, Germany	4–6 August	Deutsche Tourenwagen Masters; ADAC GT4 Germany; Porsche Carrera Cup Germany
4	Karlskoga Motorstadion, Karlskoga, Sweden	17–19 August	Porsche Carrera Cup Scandinavia; Porsche Sprint Challenge Scandinavia
5	Ring Knutstorp, Kågeröd, Sweden	30 August–1 September	V8 Thunder Cars; Radical Cup Scandinavia
6	Mantorp Park, Mantorp, Sweden	21–23 September	Porsche Carrera Cup Scandinavia; Porsche Sprint Challenge Scandinavia

== Entry list ==
All of the drivers used the LRT NXT1.

No.	Driver	Rounds
2	(Netherlands) Greaham Hofmans	All
3	(Sweden) Linus Granfors	All
4	(Sweden) Theo Jernberg	All
5	(Sweden) Sebastian Kinnmark	All
6	(Sweden) Isak Arvidsson	1–2
6	(Germany) Mats Overhoff	3
6	(Denmark) Mikkel Njor	4–6
7	(Sweden) Enzo Hallman	All
8	(Sweden) Elias Adestam	All
9	(Netherlands) Bente Boer	3
9	(Sweden) Isak Arvidsson	4, 6
9	(Netherlands) Lukas Stiefelhagen	5
11	(United States) Ellis Spiezia	All
12	(Czech Republic) Filip Bartoš	All
14	(United Kingdom) Katie Turner	All
16	(Sweden) Månz Thalin	All
19	(Sweden) Alexander Gustafsson	All
21	(Sweden) Siri Hökfelt	All
26	(Sweden) Oscar Pedersen	1
27	(Sweden) Alexzander Kristiansson	All
47	(Sweden) Jonathan Engström	All
50	(Denmark) Victor Nielsen	All
51	(Sweden) Louise Larsson	All
91	(Romania) Sebastian Serban	6

Icon	Class
	Guest Starter

== Results ==
Round		Circuit	Pole position	Fastest lap	Winning driver
1	R1	(Sweden) Falkenbergs Motorbana	(Sweden) Elias Adestam	(United States) Ellis Spiezia	(Sweden) Elias Adestam
1	R2	(Sweden) Falkenbergs Motorbana		(Sweden) Enzo Hallman	(United States) Ellis Spiezia
2	R1	(Germany) Motorsport Arena Oschersleben	(United States) Ellis Spiezia	(Sweden) Elias Adestam	(Sweden) Elias Adestam
2	R2	(Germany) Motorsport Arena Oschersleben		(United States) Ellis Spiezia	(United States) Ellis Spiezia
3	R1	(Germany) Nürburgring	(Sweden) Linus Granfors	(Sweden) Theo Jernberg	(Sweden) Linus Granfors
3	R2	(Germany) Nürburgring		(Sweden) Linus Granfors	(Sweden) Linus Granfors
4	R1	(Sweden) Karlskoga Motorstadion	(Sweden) Elias Adestam	(Sweden) Linus Granfors	(Sweden) Elias Adestam
4	R2	(Sweden) Karlskoga Motorstadion		(Sweden) Jonathan Engström	(Sweden) Linus Granfors
5	R1	(Sweden) Ring Knutstorp	(Netherlands) Lukas Stiefelhagen	(Sweden) Linus Granfors	(Sweden) Linus Granfors
5	R2	(Sweden) Ring Knutstorp		(Sweden) Linus Granfors	(Sweden) Elias Adestam
6	R1	(Sweden) Mantorp Park	(Sweden) Linus Granfors	(Denmark) Mikkel Njor	(Sweden) Elias Adestam
6	R2	(Sweden) Mantorp Park		(Sweden) Jonathan Engström	(Denmark) Mikkel Njor

== Championship standings ==
=== Scoring system ===
Position	**1st**	**2nd**	**3rd**	**4th**	**5th**	**6th**	**7th**	**8th**	**9th**	**10th**	**11th**	**12th**	**13th**	**14th**	**15th**	**16th**	**FL**
Points	30	25	21	17	14	12	10	9	8	7	6	5	4	3	2	1	1

Additionally, the top three placed drivers in qualifying also received points:

Qualifying position	**1st**	**2nd**	**3rd**
Points	4	2	1

=== Drivers' championship ===
Pos.	Driver	FAL (Sweden)		OSC (Germany)		NÜR (Germany)		KAR (Sweden)		KNU (Sweden)		MAN (Sweden)		Points
1	(Sweden) Elias Adestam	**1^{1}**	15	1	9	12	3	**1^{1}**	14	2^{2}	1	1^{3}	4	243
2	(Sweden) Linus Granfors	2^{3}	4	16^{2}	6	**1^{1}**	1	4	1	1	9	**2^{1}**	Ret	240
3	(United States) Ellis Spiezia	4	1	**2^{1}**	1	2	2	17†	7	4	15	4	2	229
4	(Sweden) Enzo Hallman	5	2	Ret	8	3^{2}	8	3^{3}	2	6	3	3^{2}	8	193
5	(Sweden) Jonathan Engström	14	7	6	2	4	5	2	4	10	4	9	7	167
6	(Sweden) Alexzander Kristiansson	7	12	7	3	14†^{3}	13	6^{2}	5	8	2	8	3	146
7	(Denmark) Victor Nielsen	18†^{2}	6	3	4	8	9	5	8	11	6	5	5	138
8	(Sweden) Alexander Gustafsson	6	5	5	5	6	4	9	9	7	5	12	10	135
9	(Sweden) Theo Jernberg	8	9	4^{3}	7	7	12	7	3	9^{3}	11	10	11	120
10	(Denmark) Mikkel Njor							10	10	3	13	6	1	82
11	(Sweden) Månz Thalin	11	Ret	12	13	5	7	Ret	11	12	7	11	12	71
12	(Netherlands) Greaham Hofmans	12	13	14	14	9	14	11	16	Ret	12	7	6	60
13	(Sweden) Sebastian Kinnmark	13	10	8	10	15†	15	13	12	14	10	16	14	54
14	(Sweden) Isak Arvidsson	16	11	9	15			8	6			14	9	49
15	(Sweden) Siri Hökfelt	9	8	10	11	16†	16	12	13	16	Ret	15	15	46
16	(Sweden) Oscar Pedersen	3	3											42
17	(Sweden) Louise Larsson	10	14	11	12	Ret	Ret	14	17	13	16	13	13	37
18	(Czech Republic) Filip Bartoš	15	16	13	16	13	10	15	15	15	14	17	16	29
19	(Netherlands) Lukas Stiefelhagen									**5^{1}**	8			27
20	(Germany) Mats Overhoff					10	6							19
21	(Netherlands) Bente Boer					11	11							12
22	(United Kingdom) Katie Turner	17	17†	15	Ret	Ret	17	16	18	WD	WD	18	Ret	3
Guest drivers ineligible to score points.
–	(Romania) Sebastian Serban											19	17	–
Pos.	Driver	FAL (Sweden)		OSC (Germany)		NÜR (Germany)		KAR (Sweden)		KNU (Sweden)		MAN (Sweden)		Points

Colour	Result
Gold	Winner
Silver	Second place
Bronze	Third place
Green	Points classification
Blue	Non-points classification
Blue	Non-classified finish (NC)
Purple	Retired, not classified (Ret)
Red	Did not qualify (DNQ)
Red	Did not pre-qualify (DNPQ)
Black	Disqualified (DSQ)
White	Did not start (DNS)
White	Withdrew (WD)
White	Race cancelled (C)
Blank	Did not practice (DNP)
Blank	Did not arrive (DNA)
Blank	Excluded (EX)

**Bold** – Pole

Italics – Fastest Lap

† — Did not finish, but classified

^{1} – 4 points for Pole

^{2} – 2 points for P2

^{3} – 1 point for P3
