= Norisring =

Street circuit in Germany

- Street Circuit (1972–present)
- Location: Nuremberg, Germany
- Coordinates: 49°25′53″N 11°07′30″E
- FIA Grade: 2
- Opened: 18 May 1948; 78 years ago
- Major events: Current: DTM; Norisring Nürnberg 200 Speedweekend (1984, 1987–1996, 2000–2019, 2021–present); Porsche Carrera Cup Germany (1986–1992, 1994–1996, 1998–2017, 2019, 2025); ADAC GT4 Germany (2024–present); Former: TCR Europe (2022); W Series (2019); F3 European Championship (2012–2018); Super Tourenwagen Cup (1997–1999); Porsche Supercup (1993); World Sportscar Championship (1986–1987); BMW M1 Procar Championship (1980); Formula Two (1973)
- Website: http://www.norisring.de

Street Circuit (1972–present)
- Surface: Asphalt
- Length: 2.300 km (1.429 mi)
- Turns: 8
- Race lap record: 0:46.618 ( (Switzerland) Nico Müller, Audi RS5 Turbo DTM 2019, 2019, Class 1)

Street Circuit (1948, 1952–1957, 1961–1971)
- Surface: Asphalt
- Length: 3.940 km (2.448 mi)
- Turns: 8
- Race lap record: 1.13.800 ( (United Kingdom) Peter Gethin, McLaren M8E, 1971, Group 7)

Short Street Circuit (1960–1968)
- Surface: Asphalt
- Length: 1.620 km (1.007 mi)
- Turns: 6

Street Circuit (1949–1951)
- Surface: Asphalt
- Length: 4.000 km (2.485 mi)
- Turns: 10

Street Circuit (1947)
- Surface: Asphalt
- Length: 2.000 km (1.243 mi)
- Turns: 7

The Norisring is a street circuit in Nuremberg, Bavaria, Germany. Originally established as a motorcycle racing venue in 1947 and named in a 1950 competition to win a light motorcycle, the track became known as a sports car racing venue in the 1970s. Since 2000, it has been annually used by the Deutsche Tourenwagen Masters, the premier Germany-based touring car racing series. The length of the simple track with two hairpin turns and a chicane has been set to 2.300 km (1.429 mi) since 1972, after various lengths were used in its early years.

== History ==
On 18 May 1947, the first motorcycle racing event took place at the Nuremberg street circuit that ran around the 360 m (390 yd) long former Nazi Party rally grounds grandstand, called the Zeppelinfeld or simply the Steintribüne. In 1950, the name Norisring was chosen for the venue in a competition to win a light motorcycle. Motorcycle racing events remained central to the circuit until 1957, as six motorcycle manufacturers were based in Nuremberg at the time, but a crisis in the industry led to no racing events taking place in 1958 and 1959.

Although automobile racing events were held at the circuit as early as 1948 and on its revival in 1960, they would only become the venue's primary focus after the Norisring Trophy was introduced in 1967. During the 1970s and 1980s, sports prototype racing was popular at the Norisring and motorcycle racing events were abandoned after 1976. The World Sportscar Championship events that took place in 1986 and 1987 each attracted more than 100,000 spectators to the circuit. After the 1980s, the venue switched its primary focus to touring car racing. In 2000, the premier Germany-based touring car series was revived under the Deutsche Tourenwagen Masters moniker and the annual Norisringrennen became the circuit's most important event.

The Norisringrennen traditionally takes place halfway through the Deutsche Tourenwagen Masters season in late June or early July. The race, which regularly attracts between 100,000 and 140,000 spectators to the circuit, is considered a highlight of the touring car series, as fans get closer to the action and the drivers than on modern venues. Since 2015, there has been one race on Saturday and one race on Sunday.

After the beginning of the 2020 season was postponed due to the COVID-19 pandemic, the Norisringrennen was planned to take place in mid-July as the season opener, but it was eventually cancelled in accordance with the restrictions on public events in Nuremberg. As the 2021 season began in late June, it was known that the Norisringrennen would not take place during the summer, but by the end of July the circuit was confirmed as the venue for the season finale in October for the first time in its history. In 2022, the Norisringrennen returned to its traditional spot in the race calendar, and a round of the TCR Europe Touring Car Series was run in support of the main event for the first time.

Due to its proximity to the Dutzendteich lake and its location inside a large city, the Norisring has been compared to the Circuit de Monaco.

== Layout ==
Different configurations were used in the early years of the circuit, including figure-8 layouts. Until 1972, the track length varied between 2 km (1.2 mi) and 4 km (2.5 mi), before being permanently set to 2.300 km (1.429 mi). The start-finish straight in front of the central grandstand, the Steintribüne, leads to a right-hand sweeper, followed by a left-hand U-turn that is located near the Grundig tower and called the Grundigkehre. After the U-turn, the track heads back to the Steintribüne via a left-hand sweeper, with the Schöller-S right-left chicane placed between the sweeper and the back straight. This is the place where cars often touch the outside wall. After a right-hand kink, a left-hand U-turn called the Dutzendteichkehre leads back to the main straight via a flat-out left-hand kink.

The Norisring is laid out on streets that are otherwise used for public traffic. The construction of the circuit begins two weeks before the race weekend. It includes installing 7 km (4.3 mi) of crash barriers, 6 km (3.7 mi) of catch fencing and several temporary stands. After the race weekend, the equipment is removed from the area within a week.

== Fatalities ==
Mexican racing driver Pedro Rodríguez died at the Norisring in 1971 when the Ferrari 512 he was hired to drive (in championship events, he used to race a Gulf Racing-Porsche 917) hit the bridge wall before the Schöller-S and burst into flames. Afterwards, the track was shortened by moving the Grundigkehre U-turn closer in order to reduce corner speeds. In 2006, a memorial plaque was inaugurated at the site of the crash.

In 1988, Hungarian racing driver Csaba Kesjár (quoted to enter the Formula One in the follow years) also died after crashing into the barriers at the Dutzendteichkehre during a practice session in the German Formula Three Championship.

== Events ==
Current

- July: DTM Norisring Nürnberg 200 Speedweekend, Porsche Carrera Cup Germany, ADAC GT4 Germany

Former

- ADAC GT Masters (2008, 2023)
- Audi Sport TT Cup (2015–2017)
- BMW M1 Procar Championship (1980)
- British Formula 3 International Series (2012)
- Deutsche Rennsport Meisterschaft (1973–1985)
- DTM Trophy (2021–2022)
- European Formula Two Championship (1973)
- FIA Formula 3 European Championship (2012–2018)
- Formula 3 Euro Series (2003–2012)
- Formula BMW ADAC (1997–2007)
- German Formula Three Championship (1985–1986, 1990–2002)
- Interserie (1970–1973)
- Lamborghini Super Trofeo Europe (2009)
- NXT Gen Cup (2024–2025)
- Porsche Supercup (1993)
- Prototype Cup Germany (2023, 2025)
- Super Tourenwagen Cup (1997–1999)
- TCR Europe Touring Car Series (2022)
- Volkswagen Scirocco R-Cup (2004–2014)
- W Series (2019)
- World Sportscar Championship (1986–1987)

== Lap records ==
As of July 2026, the fastest official race lap records at the Norisring are listed as:

Category	Time	Driver	Vehicle	Event
Street Circuit (1972–present): 2.300 km (1.429 mi)
Class 1 Touring Cars	0:46.618	Nico Müller	Audi RS5 Turbo DTM 2019	2019 Norisring DTM round
Group C	0:47.070	Hans-Joachim Stuck	Porsche 962C	1987 200 Miles of Norisring
DTM	0.47.846	Bruno Spengler	BMW M4 DTM	2017 Norisring DTM round
Formula Three	0:47.949	Callum Ilott	Dallara F314	2017 Norisring F3 European Championship round
GT3	0:48.830	Lucas Auer	Mercedes-AMG GT3 Evo	2026 Norisring DTM round
LMP3	0:49.097	Laurents Hörr	Duqueine D-08	2023 Norisring Prototype Cup Germany round
ITC	0.49.686	Uwe Alzen	Opel Calibra V6 4x4	1996 Norisring ITC round
Group 5	0:49.820	Rolf Stommelen	Porsche 935J	1979 Norisring DRM round
Porsche Carrera Cup	0:49.850	Flynt Schuring	Porsche 911 (992 II) Cup	2026 Norisring Porsche Carrera Cup Germany round
Formula Regional	0:50.975	Emma Kimiläinen	Tatuus F3 T-318	2019 Norisring W Series round
Formula Two	0.51.900	Jean-Pierre Jarier	March 732	1973 Norisring F2 round
GT4	0:53.592	Denny Berndt	Porsche 718 Cayman GT4 RS Clubsport	2026 Norisring ADAC GT4 Germany round
Group A	0.53.650	Emanuele Pirro	BMW M3 Sport Evolution	1992 Norisring DTM round
BMW M1 Procar	0.54.080	Marc Surer	BMW M1 Procar	1980 Norisring BMW M1 Procar round
Super Touring	0.54.351	Laurent Aïello	Peugeot 406	1997 Norisring STW Cup round
Formula BMW	0:54.698	Átila Abreu	Mygale FB02	2004 Norisring Formula BMW ADAC round
TCR Touring Car	0.54.819	Marco Butti	Audi RS 3 LMS TCR (2021)	2022 Norisring TCR Europe round
Audi Sport TT Cup	0:55.296	Lucas di Grassi	Audi TT Cup	2016 Norisring Audi Sport TT Cup round
Group 4	0.56.400	Toine Hezemans	Porsche 934	1976 Norisring European GT round
NXT Gen Cup	1:04.525	Enzo Hallman	LRT NXT1	2024 Norisring NXT Gen Cup round
Street Circuit (1948, 1952–1957, 1961–1971): 3.940 km (2.448 mi)
Group 7 (Can-Am)	1.13.800	Peter Gethin	McLaren M8E	1971 Norisring Interserie round
Group 5	1.17.300	Brian Redman	Lola T70 Mk III	1969 Norisringrennen
Formula Junior	1.37.900	Kurt Ahrens Jr.	Cooper T67	1963 Norisringrennen

== See also ==
- Norisring Nürnberg 200 Speedweekend
