= 2024 Nordic 4 Championship =

Motor racing competition

The 2024 Nordic 4 Championship season is the eighth season of the F4 Danish Championship. The season begins at Padborg Park in April and conclude at Jyllandsringen in October. This is the first season of the championship running under the new Nordic 4 banner as FIA had restricted the use of the Formula 4 name.

== Teams and drivers ==
Formula 4 entries
| Team | No. | Driver | Class | Rounds |
|---|---|---|---|---|
| (Denmark) FSP | 8 | (Denmark) Louis Leveau | | All |
| (Denmark) FSP | 15 | (Denmark) Marius Kristiansen | R | All |
| (Denmark) FSP | 31 | (Denmark) Mads Kjeldtoft Ljungberg | R | 1–2, 6 |
| (Denmark) FSP | 61 | (Sweden) Alexia Danielsson | | All |
| (Denmark) MP Racing | 12 | (Denmark) Magnus Pedersen | | All |
| (Denmark) STEP Motorsport | 13 | (Denmark) Lærke Rønn Sørensen | | All |
| (Denmark) STEP Motorsport | 21 | (Denmark) Mathias Bjerre Jakobsen | | All |
| (Denmark) STEP Motorsport | 38 | (Denmark) Sebastian Schou | R | 1, 7 |
| (Denmark) STEP Motorsport | 77 | (Poland) Gustaw Wiśniewski | R | 4–7 |
| (Denmark) STEP Motorsport | 88 | (Denmark) Sebastian Bach | R | All |
| (Denmark) RaceCraft Driver Academy | 10 | (Denmark) Anton Morsing | R | 1 |
| (Denmark) RaceCraft Driver Academy | 10 | (Denmark) Lau Gerner Knudsen | R | 2 |
| (Denmark) RaceCraft Driver Academy | 10 | (Denmark) Michella Rasmussen | | 3, 7 |
| (Denmark) RaceCraft Driver Academy | 11 | (Denmark) Nikolaj Dyrved | R | 1, 4 |
| (Denmark) RaceCraft Driver Academy | 11 | (Denmark) Carl Pramming | R | 2, 7 |
Formula 5 entries
| (Denmark) Leerskov Racing | 4 | (Denmark) Jørgen Leerskov | | 1, 3–7 |
| (Denmark) Mads Hoe Motorsport | 16 | (Denmark) Mads Kjelde Larsen | R | All |
| (Denmark) Mads Hoe Motorsport | 47 | (Denmark) Mads Hoe | | All |
| (Denmark) Mads Hoe Motorsport | 56 | (Denmark) Mille Hoe | | All |
| (Denmark) Sønderskov Motorsport | 39 | (Denmark) Line Sønderskov | | 2, 4, 6–7 |
| (Denmark) Rytteriet | 49 | (Denmark) Niels Ejnar Rytter | | 1, 3–7 |
| (Denmark) MT Motorsport | 222 | (Denmark) Marcus Terkildsen | R | 1–2, 4, 7 |

- Emily Cotty was scheduled to compete for STEP Motorsport, but did not appear at any rounds.

== Calendar ==
The championship make two abroad visits to Sweden. For these two rounds as well as the final round in Denmark, the series will be combining its grid with Formula Nordic, as it did in 2023.

| Rnd. | | Circuit/Location | Date | Supporting |
|---|---|---|---|---|
| 1 | R1 | (Denmark) Padborg Park, Padborg | 28–29 April | TCR Denmark; Super GT Denmark |
| 1 | R2 | (Denmark) Padborg Park, Padborg | 28–29 April | TCR Denmark; Super GT Denmark |
| 1 | R3 | (Denmark) Padborg Park, Padborg | 28–29 April | TCR Denmark; Super GT Denmark |
| 2 | R1 | (Denmark) Jyllands-Ringen, Silkeborg | 11–12 May | TCR Denmark; Super GT Denmark |
| 2 | R2 | (Denmark) Jyllands-Ringen, Silkeborg | 11–12 May | TCR Denmark; Super GT Denmark |
| 2 | R3 | (Denmark) Jyllands-Ringen, Silkeborg | 11–12 May | TCR Denmark; Super GT Denmark |
| 3 | R1 | (Sweden) Karlskoga Motorstadion, Karlskoga | 1–2 June | Formula Nordic; Porsche Carrera Cup Scandinavia |
| 3 | R2 | (Sweden) Karlskoga Motorstadion, Karlskoga | 1–2 June | Formula Nordic; Porsche Carrera Cup Scandinavia |
| 3 | R3 | (Sweden) Karlskoga Motorstadion, Karlskoga | 1–2 June | Formula Nordic; Porsche Carrera Cup Scandinavia |
| 4 | R1 | (Denmark) Ring Djursland, Pederstrup | 22–23 June | Super GT Denmark |
| 4 | R2 | (Denmark) Ring Djursland, Pederstrup | 22–23 June | Super GT Denmark |
| 4 | R3 | (Denmark) Ring Djursland, Pederstrup | 22–23 June | Super GT Denmark |
| 5 | R1 | (Sweden) Falkenbergs Motorbana, Falkenberg | 13–14 July | Formula Nordic; Radical Cup Scandinavia |
| 5 | R2 | (Sweden) Falkenbergs Motorbana, Falkenberg | 13–14 July | Formula Nordic; Radical Cup Scandinavia |
| 5 | R3 | (Sweden) Falkenbergs Motorbana, Falkenberg | 13–14 July | Formula Nordic; Radical Cup Scandinavia |
| 6 | R1 | (Denmark) Padborg Park, Padborg | 13–14 September | TCR Denmark; Super GT Denmark |
| 6 | R2 | (Denmark) Padborg Park, Padborg | 13–14 September | TCR Denmark; Super GT Denmark |
| 6 | R3 | (Denmark) Padborg Park, Padborg | 13–14 September | TCR Denmark; Super GT Denmark |
| 7 | R1 | (Denmark) Jyllands-Ringen, Silkeborg | 28–29 September | Formula Nordic; TCR Denmark |
| 7 | R2 | (Denmark) Jyllands-Ringen, Silkeborg | 28–29 September | Formula Nordic; TCR Denmark |
| 7 | R3 | (Denmark) Jyllands-Ringen, Silkeborg | 28–29 September | Formula Nordic; TCR Denmark |

== Race results ==
| Rnd. | | Circuit/Location | Overall | | | Formula 5 |
| Rnd. | | Circuit/Location | Pole position | Fastest lap | Winning driver | Winning driver |
|---|---|---|---|---|---|---|
| 1 | R1 | (Denmark) Padborg Park | (Denmark) Mathias Bjerre Jakobsen | (Denmark) Mathias Bjerre Jakobsen | (Denmark) Mathias Bjerre Jakobsen | (Denmark) Mads Hoe |
| 1 | R2 | (Denmark) Padborg Park | | (Denmark) Marius Kristiansen | (Denmark) Mads Hoe | (Denmark) Mads Hoe |
| 1 | R3 | (Denmark) Padborg Park | | (Denmark) Marius Kristiansen | (Denmark) Mads Hoe | (Denmark) Mads Hoe |
| 2 | R1 | (Denmark) Jyllands-Ringen | (Denmark) Mathias Bjerre Jakobsen | (Denmark) Mathias Bjerre Jakobsen | (Denmark) Sebastian Bach | (Denmark) Mads Hoe |
| 2 | R2 | (Denmark) Jyllands-Ringen | | (Denmark) Mathias Bjerre Jakobsen | (Denmark) Magnus Pedersen | (Denmark) Mads Hoe |
| 2 | R3 | (Denmark) Jyllands-Ringen | | (Denmark) Mathias Bjerre Jakobsen | (Denmark) Magnus Pedersen | (Denmark) Mads Hoe |
| 3 | R1 | (Sweden) Karlskoga Motorstadion | (Denmark) Mathias Bjerre Jakobsen | (Denmark) Mathias Bjerre Jakobsen | (Denmark) Mathias Bjerre Jakobsen | (Denmark) Mads Hoe |
| 3 | R2 | (Sweden) Karlskoga Motorstadion | | (Denmark) Mathias Bjerre Jakobsen | (Denmark) Mathias Bjerre Jakobsen | (Denmark) Mads Kjelde Larsen |
| 3 | R3 | (Sweden) Karlskoga Motorstadion | | (Denmark) Mathias Bjerre Jakobsen | (Denmark) Mathias Bjerre Jakobsen | (Denmark) Mads Hoe |
| 4 | R1 | (Denmark) Ring Djursland | (Denmark) Magnus Pedersen | (Denmark) Mads Hoe | (Denmark) Mads Hoe | (Denmark) Mads Hoe |
| 4 | R2 | (Denmark) Ring Djursland | | (Denmark) Mads Hoe | (Denmark) Mads Hoe | (Denmark) Mads Hoe |
| 4 | R3 | (Denmark) Ring Djursland | | (Denmark) Mads Hoe | (Denmark) Mads Hoe | (Denmark) Mads Hoe |
| 5 | R1 | (Sweden) Falkenbergs Motorbana | (Poland) Gustaw Wiśniewski | (Denmark) Louis Leveau | (Denmark) Mathias Bjerre Jakobsen | (Denmark) Mads Hoe |
| 5 | R2 | (Sweden) Falkenbergs Motorbana | | (Poland) Gustaw Wiśniewski | (Denmark) Mathias Bjerre Jakobsen | (Denmark) Mads Hoe |
| 5 | R3 | (Sweden) Falkenbergs Motorbana | | (Poland) Gustaw Wiśniewski | (Denmark) Mathias Bjerre Jakobsen | (Denmark) Mads Hoe |
| 6 | R1 | (Denmark) Padborg Park | (Denmark) Mathias Bjerre Jakobsen | (Denmark) Magnus Pedersen | (Denmark) Mathias Bjerre Jakobsen | (Denmark) Mads Hoe |
| 6 | R2 | (Denmark) Padborg Park | | (Denmark) Marius Kristiansen | (Denmark) Mathias Bjerre Jakobsen | (Denmark) Mads Kjelde Larsen |
| 6 | R3 | (Denmark) Padborg Park | | (Denmark) Mathias Bjerre Jakobsen | (Denmark) Mathias Bjerre Jakobsen | (Denmark) Mads Hoe |
| 7 | R1 | (Denmark) Jyllands-Ringen | (Denmark) Louis Leveau | (Denmark) Mathias Bjerre Jakobsen | (Denmark) Mathias Bjerre Jakobsen | (Denmark) Mads Hoe |
| 7 | R2 | (Denmark) Jyllands-Ringen | | (Denmark) Marius Kristiansen | (Poland) Gustaw Wiśniewski | (Denmark) Mads Hoe |
| 7 | R3 | (Denmark) Jyllands-Ringen | | (Denmark) Mathias Bjerre Jakobsen | (Denmark) Mathias Bjerre Jakobsen | (Denmark) Mads Hoe |

== Championship standings ==
Points are awarded to the top 10 classified finishers in each race. No points are awarded for pole position or fastest lap.

| Position | **1st** | **2nd** | **3rd** | **4th** | **5th** | **6th** | **7th** | **8th** | **9th** | **10th** |
| Points | 25 | 18 | 15 | 12 | 10 | 8 | 6 | 4 | 2 | 1 |

=== Drivers' standings ===
| Pos | Driver | PAD1 (Denmark) | | | JYL1 (Denmark) | | | KAR (Sweden) | | | DJU (Denmark) | | | FAL (Sweden) | | | PAD2 (Denmark) | | | JYL2 (Denmark) | | | Pts |
| Pos | Driver | R1 | R2 | R3 | R1 | R2 | R3 | R1 | R2 | R3 | R1 | R2 | R3 | R1 | R2 | R3 | R1 | R2 | R3 | R1 | R2 | R3 | Pts |
|---|---|---|---|---|---|---|---|---|---|---|---|---|---|---|---|---|---|---|---|---|---|---|---|
| 1 | (Denmark) Mathias Bjerre Jakobsen | **1** | 3 | Ret | **Ret** | 3 | 4 | **1** | 1 | 1 | 3 | 3 | 3 | 1 | 1 | 1 | **1** | 1 | 1 | 1 | 4 | 1 | 399 |
| 2 | (Denmark) Mads Hoe **(F5)** | 2 | 1 | 1 | 2 | 4 | 2 | 2 | Ret | 2 | 1 | 1 | 1 | 10 | 4 | 6 | 2 | Ret | 4 | 3 | 6 | 3 | 321 |
| 3 | (Denmark) Magnus Pedersen | 3 | 5 | 3 | 5 | 1 | 1 | 16† | 4 | 3 | **2** | 2 | 2 | 3 | 14 | 5 | 3 | 4 | 3 | 2 | 5 | 5 | 288 |
| 4 | (Denmark) Sebastian Bach **(R)** | 4 | 8 | 5 | 1 | 5 | 3 | 5 | 5 | 4 | 6 | 6 | 4 | 7 | 2 | 3 | 5 | 2 | 2 | 5 | 2 | 4 | 263 |
| 5 | (Denmark) Marius Kristiansen **(R)** | Ret | 4 | 2 | 4 | 2 | 5 | 4 | 3 | 21† | 4 | 4 | 7 | 2 | 5 | 4 | 4 | 16 | 7 | 4 | 3 | 2 | 230 |
| 6 | (Denmark) Louis Leveau | 6 | 9 | 7 | 3 | 6 | 6 | 3 | 2 | Ret | 5 | 5 | 8 | 4 | Ret | 7 | 10 | 8 | 5 | **19** | 11 | 10 | 145 |
| 7 | (Denmark) Lærke Rønn Sørensen | 5 | 2 | 4 | 6 | 8 | 14† | 11 | 7 | 5 | 12 | 15 | 6 | 11 | 13 | 9 | 7 | 3 | 9 | 14 | 7 | 7 | 130 |
| 8 | (Poland) Gustaw Wiśniewski **(R)** | | | | | | | | | | 11 | 11 | 5 | **5** | 3 | 2 | 6 | 6 | 6 | 6 | 1 | Ret | 110 |
| 9 | (Denmark) Mads Kjelde Larsen **(F5)** | 7 | 7 | Ret | 8 | 7 | WD | 10 | 6 | 10 | DNS | 9 | 11 | 14 | 6 | 11 | 11 | 7 | 10 | 11 | 12 | 11 | 68 |
| 10 | (Sweden) Alexia Danielsson | 12 | 10 | 11 | 12 | 13 | 9 | 8 | 10 | 7 | 9 | Ret | Ret | 12 | Ret | 13 | 8 | 5 | 8 | 20 | Ret | DNS | 45 |
| 11 | (Denmark) Mille Hoe **(F5)** | 9 | 11 | 8 | 7 | 9 | 10 | 13 | 13 | 9 | 7 | 8 | 9 | 19 | 11 | 12 | 15 | 10 | 11 | WD | WD | WD | 45 |
| 12 | (Denmark) Sebastian Schou **(R)** | 8 | 6 | 6 | | | | | | | | | | | | | | | | 13 | 15 | 8 | 28 |
| 13 | (Denmark) Carl Pramming **(R)** | | | | 9 | 11 | 7 | | | | | | | | | | | | | 10 | 13 | 13 | 16 |
| 14 | (Denmark) Marcus Terkildsen **(F5)** | 13 | 14 | Ret | 10 | 12 | 11 | | | | 8 | 7 | Ret | | | | | | | WD | WD | WD | 11 |
| 15 | (Denmark) Mads Kjeldtoft Ljungberg **(R)** | 15 | 15 | 10 | 11 | 10 | 8 | | | | | | | | | | 9 | 15 | 12 | | | | 8 |
| 16 | (Denmark) Niels Ejnar Rytter **(F5)** | 10 | WD | 13 | | | | 15 | 13 | 14 | 10 | 10 | 10 | 20 | 16 | 17 | 14 | 13 | 15 | 18 | 18 | 18 | 7 |
| 17 | (Denmark) Jørgen Leerskov **(F5)** | 14 | 12 | 12 | | | | 14 | Ret | 15 | 14 | 13 | 14 | Ret | 15 | 16 | 12 | 9 | 16 | 17 | 16 | 16 | 5 |
| 18 | (Denmark) Anton Morsing **(R)** | 11 | 13 | 9 | | | | | | | | | | | | | | | | | | | 2 |
| 19 | (Denmark) Lau Gerner Knudsen **(R)** | | | | 14 | 15 | 12 | | | | | | | | | | | | | | | | 0 |
| 20 | (Denmark) Line Sønderskov **(F5)** | | | | 13 | 14 | 13 | | | | 13 | 12 | 12 | | | | WD | WD | WD | 16 | 17 | 17 | 0 |
| 21 | (Denmark) Nikolaj Dyrved **(R)** | DNS | 16 | WD | | | | | | | 15 | 14 | 13 | | | | | | | | | | 0 |
| 22 | (Denmark) Michella Rasmussen | | | | | | | Ret | 19 | 18 | | | | | | | | | | WD | WD | WD | 0 |
Formula Nordic entries
| - | (Sweden) Daniel Varverud | | | | | | | Ret | 9 | 6 | | | | 9 | 7 | 10 | | | | 9 | Ret | 12 | – |
| - | (Sweden) Enzo Hallman | | | | | | | 9 | 11 | 12 | | | | 6 | 8 | 8 | | | | 7 | 8 | 9 | – |
| - | (Sweden) Albin Stureson | | | | | | | 6 | 8 | 11 | | | | 8 | 12 | DNS | | | | 12 | 9 | 14 | – |
| - | (Norway) Peter Saltvedt | | | | | | | Ret | 12 | 13 | | | | 13 | 9 | 15 | | | | 8 | 10 | 6 | – |
| - | (Sweden) Robin Hafström | | | | | | | 7 | 21 | 8 | | | | 15 | 10 | 14 | | | | 15 | 14 | 15 | – |
| - | (Sweden) Andreas Aichhorn | | | | | | | 12 | 15 | 19 | | | | 16 | DNS | 19 | | | | | | | – |
| - | (Norway) Birk August Larsen | | | | | | | Ret | 14 | Ret | | | | 17 | Ret | DNS | | | | | | | – |
| - | (Greece) Joannis Matentzoglou | | | | | | | Ret | 17 | 16 | | | | DNS | DNS | WD | | | | | | | – |
| - | (United Kingdom) Flame Airikkala | | | | | | | DSQ | 18 | 17 | | | | | | | | | | | | | – |
| - | (Sweden) Viktor Molander | | | | | | | Ret | 20 | 20 | | | | 21 | DNS | 18 | | | | 21 | 19 | 19 | – |
| - | (Denmark) Philip Engbæk | | | | | | | | | | | | | 18 | Ret | DNS | | | | | | | – |
| Pos | Driver | R1 | R2 | R3 | R1 | R2 | R3 | R1 | R2 | R3 | R1 | R2 | R3 | R1 | R2 | R3 | R1 | R2 | R3 | R1 | R2 | R3 | Pts |
| Pos | Driver | PAD1 (Denmark) | | | JYL1 (Denmark) | | | KAR (Sweden) | | | DJU (Denmark) | | | FAL (Sweden) | | | PAD2 (Denmark) | | | JYL2 (Denmark) | | | Pts |

| Colour | Result |
|---|---|
| Gold | Winner |
| Silver | Second place |
| Bronze | Third place |
| Green | Points classification |
| Blue | Non-points classification |
| Blue | Non-classified finish (NC) |
| Purple | Retired, not classified (Ret) |
| Red | Did not qualify (DNQ) |
| Red | Did not pre-qualify (DNPQ) |
| Black | Disqualified (DSQ) |
| White | Did not start (DNS) |
| White | Withdrew (WD) |
| White | Race cancelled (C) |
| Blank | Did not practice (DNP) |
| Blank | Did not arrive (DNA) |
| Blank | Excluded (EX) |

**Bold** – Pole
Italics – Fastest Lap

- † – Driver did not finish the race, but was classified as they completed over 75% of the race distance.
