= 2024 NXT Gen Cup season =

The 2024 NXT Gen Cup was the second season of NXT Gen Cup, world’s first fully electric junior touring car cup. It began at Norisring on 5 July and ended at Hockenheimring on 20 October.

== Calendar ==
Originally the NXT Gen Cup was supposed to be a support event to the 2023–24 Formula E World Championship, but the plans were cancelled and the series supported 4 rounds of the 2024 Deutsche Tourenwagen Masters.

| Round | Circuit | Date | Supporting |
|---|---|---|---|
| 1 | Norisring, Nuremberg, Germany | 5–7 July | Deutsche Tourenwagen Masters; ADAC GT4 Germany |
| 2 | Nürburgring, Nürburg, Germany | 16–18 August | Deutsche Tourenwagen Masters; ADAC GT4 Germany; Prototype Cup Germany; Porsche Carrera Cup Germany |
| 3 | Sachsenring, Hohenstein-Ernstthal, Germany | 6–8 September | Deutsche Tourenwagen Masters; Prototype Cup Germany; Porsche Carrera Cup Germany |
| 4 | Hockenheimring, Hockenheim, Germany | 18–20 October | Deutsche Tourenwagen Masters; ADAC GT Masters; ADAC GT4 Germany; Porsche Carrera Cup Germany |
Cancelled rounds
| – | Misano World Circuit Marco Simoncelli, Misano Adriatico, Italy | 13–14 April | Formula E World Championship |
| – | Circuit de Monaco, Monte Carlo, Monaco | 27 April | Formula E World Championship |
| – | Tempelhof Airport Street Circuit, Berlin, Germany | 11–12 May | Formula E World Championship |
| – | ExCeL London Circuit, London, United Kingdom | 20–21 July | Formula E World Championship |

== Entry list ==
All of the drivers used the LRT NXT1.

| No. | Driver | Rounds |
|---|---|---|
| 2 | (Netherlands) Greaham Hofmans | All |
| 3 | (Sweden) Linus Stjernelund | All |
| 4 | (Latvia) Patricija Stalidzāne | All |
| 5 | (Belgium) Nicolas Béver | 3 |
| 6 | (United Kingdom) Jodie Sloss | 3 |
| 7 | (Sweden) Enzo Hallman | All |
| 8 | (Germany) Chantal Fugel (Note: née Röhner) | All |
| 9 | (Netherlands) Lukas Stiefelhagen | All |
| 10 | (Germany) Jacqueline Kreutzpointner | 1 |
| 10 | (Germany) Ben Bendler | 2 |
| 10 | (Germany) Bennet Ehrl | 3 |
| 11 | (Germany) Alesia Kreutzpointner | 1 |
| 11 | (Norway) Storm Julius Gjerdrum | 2 |
| 12 | (Czech Republic) Filip Bartoš | All |
| 15 | (Germany) Theo Wieder | 4 |
| 16 | (Germany) Niklas Kalus | 4 |
| 17 | (Sweden) Alxander Spetz | 3 |
| 19 | (Sweden) Alex Gustafsson | 1 |
| 19 | (Germany) Leon Arndt | 4 |
| 21 | (Sweden) Siri Hökfelt | All |
| 23 | (Germany) Laurenz Rühl | 1–2, 4 |
| 24 | (Netherlands) Calvin de Groot | All |
| 27 | (Sweden) Alexzander Kristiansson | 4 |
| 35 | (Germany) Benjamin Mazatis | All |
| 47 | (Germany) Sophie Hofmann | All |
| 50 | (Denmark) Victor Nielsen | All |
| 91 | (Netherlands) Misha Charoudin | 2 |
| 91 | (Germany) Matthias Killing | 3 |

| Icon | Class |
|---|---|
| | Guest Starter |

- Emilien Carde, Jonathan Engström, Månz Thalin, Maxim Van Den Doel and Sita Vanmeert were supposed to start the season, but did not appear in any rounds.

== Results ==
| Round | | Circuit | Pole position | Fastest lap | Winning driver |
|---|---|---|---|---|---|
| 1 | R1 | (Germany) Norisring | (Netherlands) Lukas Stiefelhagen | (Netherlands) Calvin de Groot | (Netherlands) Lukas Stiefelhagen |
| 1 | R2 | (Germany) Norisring | | (Denmark) Victor Nielsen | (Denmark) Victor Nielsen |
| 1 | R3 | (Germany) Norisring | (Sweden) Linus Stjernelund | (Sweden) Enzo Hallman | (Netherlands) Calvin de Groot |
| 1 | R4 | (Germany) Norisring | | (Sweden) Linus Stjernelund | (Denmark) Victor Nielsen |
| 2 | R1 | (Germany) Nürburgring | (Denmark) Victor Nielsen | (Denmark) Victor Nielsen | (Netherlands) Calvin de Groot |
| 2 | R2 | (Germany) Nürburgring | | (Denmark) Victor Nielsen | (Netherlands) Calvin de Groot |
| 2 | R3 | (Germany) Nürburgring | | (Denmark) Victor Nielsen | (Netherlands) Calvin de Groot |
| 3 | R1 | (Germany) Sachsenring | (Belgium) Nicolas Béver | (Belgium) Nicolas Béver | (Denmark) Victor Nielsen |
| 3 | R2 | (Germany) Sachsenring | | (Sweden) Enzo Hallman | (Denmark) Victor Nielsen |
| 3 | R3 | (Germany) Sachsenring | (Netherlands) Calvin de Groot | (Latvia) Patricija Stalidzane | (Netherlands) Calvin de Groot |
| 3 | R4 | (Germany) Sachsenring | | (Denmark) Victor Nielsen | (Denmark) Victor Nielsen |
| 4 | R1 | (Germany) Hockenheimring | (Denmark) Victor Nielsen | (Sweden) Enzo Hallman | (Denmark) Victor Nielsen |
| 4 | R2 | (Germany) Hockenheimring | | (Denmark) Victor Nielsen | (Netherlands) Calvin de Groot |

== Championship standings ==
=== Scoring system ===
| Position | **1st** | **2nd** | **3rd** | **4th** | **5th** | **6th** | **7th** | **8th** | **9th** | **10th** | **11th** | **12th** | **13th** | **14th** | **15th** | **16th** | **FL** |
| Points | 30 | 25 | 21 | 17 | 14 | 12 | 10 | 9 | 8 | 7 | 6 | 5 | 4 | 3 | 2 | 1 | 1 |

Additionally, the top three placed drivers in qualifying also received points:

| Qualifying position | **1st** | **2nd** | **3rd** |
| Points | 4 | 2 | 1 |

=== Drivers' championship ===
| Pos. | Driver | NOR (Germany) | | | | NÜR (Germany) | | | SAC (Germany) | | | | HOC (Germany) | | Points |
|---|---|---|---|---|---|---|---|---|---|---|---|---|---|---|---|
| 1 | (Netherlands) Calvin de Groot | 2^{2} | 2 | 1^{2} | 2 | 1^{2} | 1 | 1 | **3^{1}** | 3 | **1^{1}** | 4 | 5^{2} | 1 | 345 |
| 2 | (Denmark) Victor Nielsen | 6^{3} | 1 | 3^{3} | 1 | **5^{1}** | 2 | 5 | 1^{2} | 1 | 2^{3} | 1 | **1^{1}** | 2 | 335 |
| 3 | (Sweden) Enzo Hallman | 3 | 4 | 4 | 3 | 2 | 5 | 2 | 2 | 9 | 3 | 3 | 2 | 3 | 265 |
| 4 | (Netherlands) Lukas Stiefelhagen | **1^{1}** | 3 | 2 | Ret | 4^{3} | 14 | 6 | 4^{3} | 2 | 5 | 6 | 8^{3} | 4 | 214 |
| 5 | (Latvia) Patricija Stalidzane | 5 | 6 | 6 | Ret | 6 | 4 | 7 | 8 | 4 | 7^{2} | 2 | 4 | 8 | 170 |
| 6 | (Sweden) Linus Stjernelund | 8 | 15 | **5^{1}** | 7 | 3 | 3 | 3 | 5 | 6 | 6 | 10 | Ret | 7 | 162 |
| 7 | (Netherlands) Greaham Hofmans | 11 | 8 | 10 | 5 | 8 | 12 | 9 | 6 | 7 | 16 | 9 | 7 | 5 | 117 |
| 8 | (Germany) Benjamin Mazatis | 7 | 7 | 16 | 9 | 11 | 7 | 8 | 9 | 11 | 11 | 8 | 12 | 10 | 98 |
| 9 | (Sweden) Siri Hökfelt | 14 | 10 | 13 | 8 | 7 | 8 | 15 | 11 | 14 | 9 | 7 | 11 | 9 | 89 |
| 10 | (Czech Republic) Filip Bartoš | Ret | 13 | 8 | 4 | 10 | 9 | 10 | 13 | 12 | 10 | 12 | 10 | 13 | 88 |
| 11 | (Germany) Sophie Hofmann | 10 | 12 | 12 | 10 | 12 | 10 | 11 | 16 | 16 | 13 | 16 | 6 | 12 | 70 |
| 12 | (Sweden) Alex Gustafsson | 4 | 5 | 7 | 6 | | | | | | | | | | 53 |
| 13 | (Sweden) Alxander Spetz | | | | | | | | 10 | 8 | 8 | 5 | | | 42 |
| 14 | (Norway) Storm Julius Gjerdrum | | | | | 9 | 6 | 4 | | | | | | | 37 |
| 15 | (Germany) Chantal Fugel (Röhner) | 15 | 16 | 14 | 13 | 14 | 15 | 16 | 15 | 15 | 14 | 15 | 13 | 15 | 37 |
| 16 | (Germany) Laurenz Rühl | 12 | 11 | 9 | Ret | 13 | 16 | 13 | | | | | 14 | 14 | 35 |
| 17 | (Germany) Niklas Kalus | | | | | | | | | | | | 3 | 6 | 33 |
| 18 | (Germany) Jacqueline Kreutzpointner | 9 | 9 | 11 | 11 | | | | | | | | | | 28 |
| 19 | (Germany) Bennet Ehrl | | | | | | | | 12 | 10 | 12 | 13 | | | 25 |
| 20 | (United Kingdom) Jodie Sloss | | | | | | | | 14 | 13 | 15 | 14 | | | 16 |
| 21 | (Germany) Leon Arndt | | | | | | | | | | | | 9 | 11 | 14 |
| 22 | (Germany) Alesia Kreutzpointner | 13 | 14 | 15 | 12 | | | | | | | | | | 14 |
| 23 | (Germany) Ben Bendler | | | | | 15 | 13 | 12 | | | | | | | 12 |
| 24 | (Germany) Theo Wieder | | | | | | | | | | | | 15 | 17 | 2 |
| 25 | (Sweden) Alexzander Kristiansson | | | | | | | | | | | | Ret | 16 | 1 |
Guest drivers ineligible to score points.
| – | (Netherlands) Misha Charoudin | | | | | 16 | 11 | 14 | | | | | | | – |
| – | (Germany) Matthias Killing | | | | | | | | 17 | WD | WD | WD | | | – |
| – | (Belgium) Nicolas Béver | | | | | | | | 7 (Note: Béver secured a fastest lap during Race 1 at Sachsenring, but Stiefelhagen inherited the bonus point.) | 5 | 4 | 11 | | | – |
| Pos. | Driver | NOR (Germany) | | | | NÜR (Germany) | | | SAC (Germany) | | | | HOC (Germany) | | Points |

| Colour | Result |
|---|---|
| Gold | Winner |
| Silver | Second place |
| Bronze | Third place |
| Green | Points classification |
| Blue | Non-points classification |
| Blue | Non-classified finish (NC) |
| Purple | Retired, not classified (Ret) |
| Red | Did not qualify (DNQ) |
| Red | Did not pre-qualify (DNPQ) |
| Black | Disqualified (DSQ) |
| White | Did not start (DNS) |
| White | Withdrew (WD) |
| White | Race cancelled (C) |
| Blank | Did not practice (DNP) |
| Blank | Did not arrive (DNA) |
| Blank | Excluded (EX) |

**Bold** – Pole

Italics – Fastest Lap

† — Did not finish, but classified

^{1} – 4 points for Pole

^{2} – 2 points for P2

^{3} – 1 point for P3
