= Falkenbergs Motorbana =

Motor racing circuit at Bergagård, Sweden

- Full Circuit (2004–present)
- Location: Bergagård, Sweden
- Coordinates: 56°58′30″N 12°34′05″E
- Owner: Falkenbergs Motorklubb
- Operator: Falkenbergs Motorklubb
- Broke ground: April 1967; 59 years ago
- Opened: 5 August 1967; 59 years ago
- Major events: Future: STCC (1996–2011, 2013–2019, 2027); Former: Nordic 4 Championship (2024–2025); TCR Denmark (2023); PSC Scandinavia (2004, 2006–2010, 2013–2017, 2020–2021); TTA – Racing Elite League (2012)

Full Circuit (2004–present)
- Length: 1.843 km (1.145 mi)
- Turns: 11
- Race lap record: 0:40.991 ( (Finland) Toomas Heikkinen, Tatuus FR2000, 2009, FR 2.0)

Original Circuit (1967–2003)
- Length: 1.830 km (1.137 mi)
- Turns: 9
- Race lap record: 0:39.252 ( (Sweden) Peter Åslund, Ralt RT35, 1992, F3)

Falkenbergs Motorbana is a motor racing circuit at Bergagård, Sweden. The circuit was opened in 1967, as a replacement for Skreabanan, and is currently owned and run by Falkenbergs Motorklubb. A chicane was added on the first corner in 2004 to improve safety on the relatively fast track. A round of the Scandinavian Touring Car Championship (formerly known as the Swedish Touring Car Championship) was held there from 1996 to 2019, except 2012. In addition there is a road racing event called Scandinavian Open run each year, endurance races, and a Classic motor event.

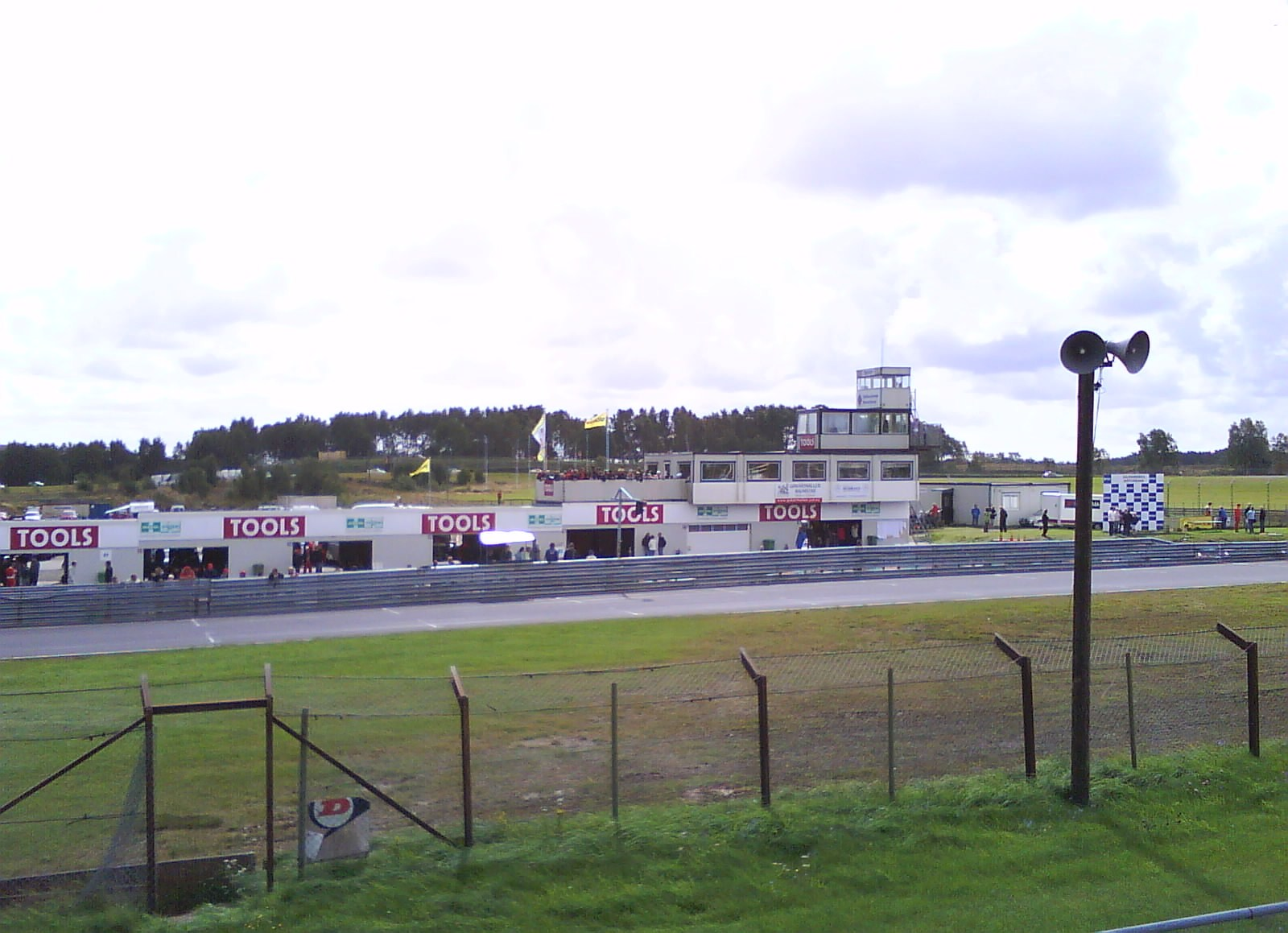
Pit garages and race control tower at Falkenbergs Motorbana.

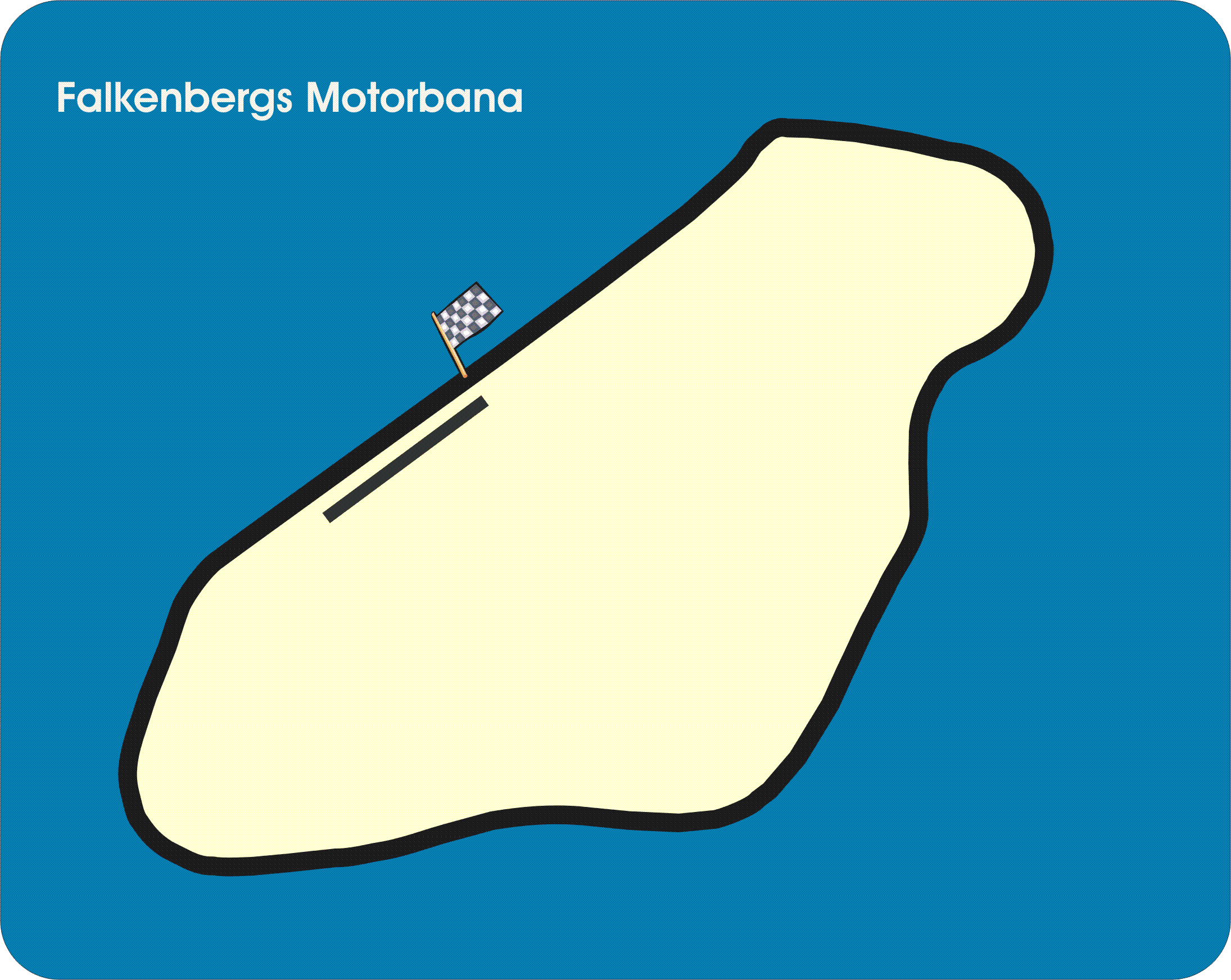
Original Circuit (1967–2003)

== Lap records ==
As of July 2024, the fastest official race lap records at Falkenbergs Motorbana are listed as:

Category	Time	Driver	Vehicle	Event
Full Circuit (2004–present): 1.843 km (1.145 mi)
Formula Renault 2.0	0:40.991	Toomas Heikkinen	Tatuus FR2000	2009 Falkenberg Formula Renault 2.0 Sweden round
Superkart	0:41.918	Henrik Vejen	PVP Superkart	2012 Falkenberg Swedish Superkart round
Sports car racing	0:42.357	Jesper Westerholm	Radical PR6	2012 Falkenberg Radical Sweden round
Porsche Carrera Cup	0:43.221	Lukas Sundahl	Porsche 911 (991 II) GT3 Cup	2020 Falkenberg Porsche Carrera Cup Scandinavia round
Silhouette racing car	0:43.283	Fredrik Ekblom	Volvo S60 TTA	2014 Falkenberg STCC round
Formula 4	0:43.648	Gustaw Wisniewski	Mygale M14-F4	2024 Falkenberg Nordic 4 round
Formula Renault 1.6	0:44.040	Enzo Hallman	Signatech FR1.6	2024 Falkenberg Formula Nordic round
Superbike	0:44.268	Jesper Pellijeff	Kawasaki ZX-10RR	2018 Falkenberg SM Roadracing round
Super 2000	0:44.978	Robin Rudholm	BMW 320si	2008 Falkenberg STCC round
TCR Touring Car	0:45.149	Daniel Haglöf	SEAT León TCR	2017 Falkenberg TCR STCC round
NXT Gen Cup	0:52.485	Ellis Spiezia	LRT NXT1	2023 Falkenberg NXT Gen Cup round
Original Circuit (1967–2004): 1.830 km (1.137 mi)
Formula Three	0:39.252	Peter Åslund	Ralt RT35	1992 Falkenberg Swedish F3 round
Super Touring	0:40.945	Nicklas Karlsson	Vauxhall Vectra 16V	2002 3rd Falkenberg STCC round
GT1 (GTS)	0:40.983	Henrik Roos	Chrysler Viper GTS-R	2001 1st Falkenberg Swedish GTR round
GT2	0:41.565	Thed Björk	Porsche 911 (996) GT3-RS	2001 2nd Falkenberg Swedish GTR round
Super 2000	0:42.424	Jan Nilsson	Volvo S60	2004 1st Falkenberg STCC round
Group 4	0:49.900	Sten Frohde	Porsche 911 S	1969 Västkustloppet Swedish 2.0 GT round
