= Bergagård =

- Location within Halland Location within Sweden
- Coordinates: 56°58′40″N 12°34′32″E
- Country: Sweden
- Province: Halland
- County: Halland County
- Municipality: Falkenberg Municipality

Area
  - Total: 0.31 km^{2} (0.12 sq mi)

Population (31 December 2010)
  - Total: 250
  - Density: 809/km^{2} (2,100/sq mi)
- Time zone: UTC+1 (CET)
  - Summer (DST): UTC+2 (CEST)

Bergagård is a locality situated in Falkenberg Municipality, Halland County, Sweden, with 250 inhabitants in 2010. It is located about 11 kilometers east of Falkenberg.

The village appeared for the first time in writing in 1569. The name is formed of the words berg (mountain) and gård (farm). It is located close to a hill with a view over river Ätran. Falkenbergs Motorbana auto racing circuit is located close to the village, which also hosts a school and a kindergarten. Large parts of the village were built in the 1970s when much housing construction took place.
