= Sachsenring =

Race track in Germany

- Grand Prix Circuit (2003–present)
- Location: Hohenstein-Ernstthal, Germany
- Coordinates: 50°47′30″N 12°41′20″E
- FIA Grade: 3
- Opened: 26 May 1927; 99 years ago Re-opened: 26 May 1996; 30 years ago (as Grand Prix Circuit)
- Closed: 1990 (as Road Circuit)
- Major events: Current: Grand Prix motorcycle racing German motorcycle Grand Prix (1998–2019, 2021–present); East German motorcycle Grand Prix (1961–1972); DTM (2000–2002, 2023–present); Future: ADAC GT Masters (2007–2023, 2027); Former: Sidecar World Championship (2005–2014, 2018, 2023–2024); FIA ETCR (2022); FIA GT1 World Championship (2011)
- Website: http://www.sachsenring-circuit.com

Circuit A Grand Prix Circuit (2003–present)
- Length: 3.671 km (2.281 mi)
- Turns: 13
- Race lap record: 1:13.714 ( (Belgium) Frédéric Vervisch, Dallara F306, 2008, F3)

Circuit B OMEGA-circuit (2003–present)
- Length: 2.100 km (1.305 mi)
- Turns: 11

Circuit C (2001–present)
- Length: 1.700 km (1.056 mi)
- Turns: 3

Grand Prix Circuit (2001–2002)
- Length: 3.704 km (2.302 mi)
- Turns: 14
- Race lap record: 1:17.151 ( (Japan) Kosuke Matsuura, Dallara F301, 2001, F3)

Grand Prix Circuit (2000)
- Length: 3.386 km (2.104 mi)
- Turns: 17
- Race lap record: 1:14.394 ( (Germany) Alex Müller, Dallara F300, 2000, F3)

Grand Prix Circuit (1998–1999)
- Length: 3.508 km (2.180 mi)
- Turns: 18
- Race lap record: 1:20.078 ( (Belgium) Bas Leinders, F397, 1998, F3)

Grand Prix Circuit (1996–1997)
- Length: 3.517 km (2.185 mi)
- Turns: 18
- Race lap record: 1:24.416 ( (Germany) Timo Scheider, Dallara F397, 1997, F3)

Original Circuit (1927–1990)
- Length: 8.618 km (5.355 mi)
- Race lap record: 2:55.400 ( (Italy) Giacomo Agostini, MV Agusta 500 Three, 1968, 500cc)

The Sachsenring (German pronunciation: [ˈzaksn̩ʁɪŋ]) is a motorsport racing circuit located in Hohenstein-Ernstthal near Chemnitz in Saxony, Germany. Among other events, it features the annual German motorcycle Grand Prix of the FIM Grand Prix motorcycle racing world championship.

== History ==
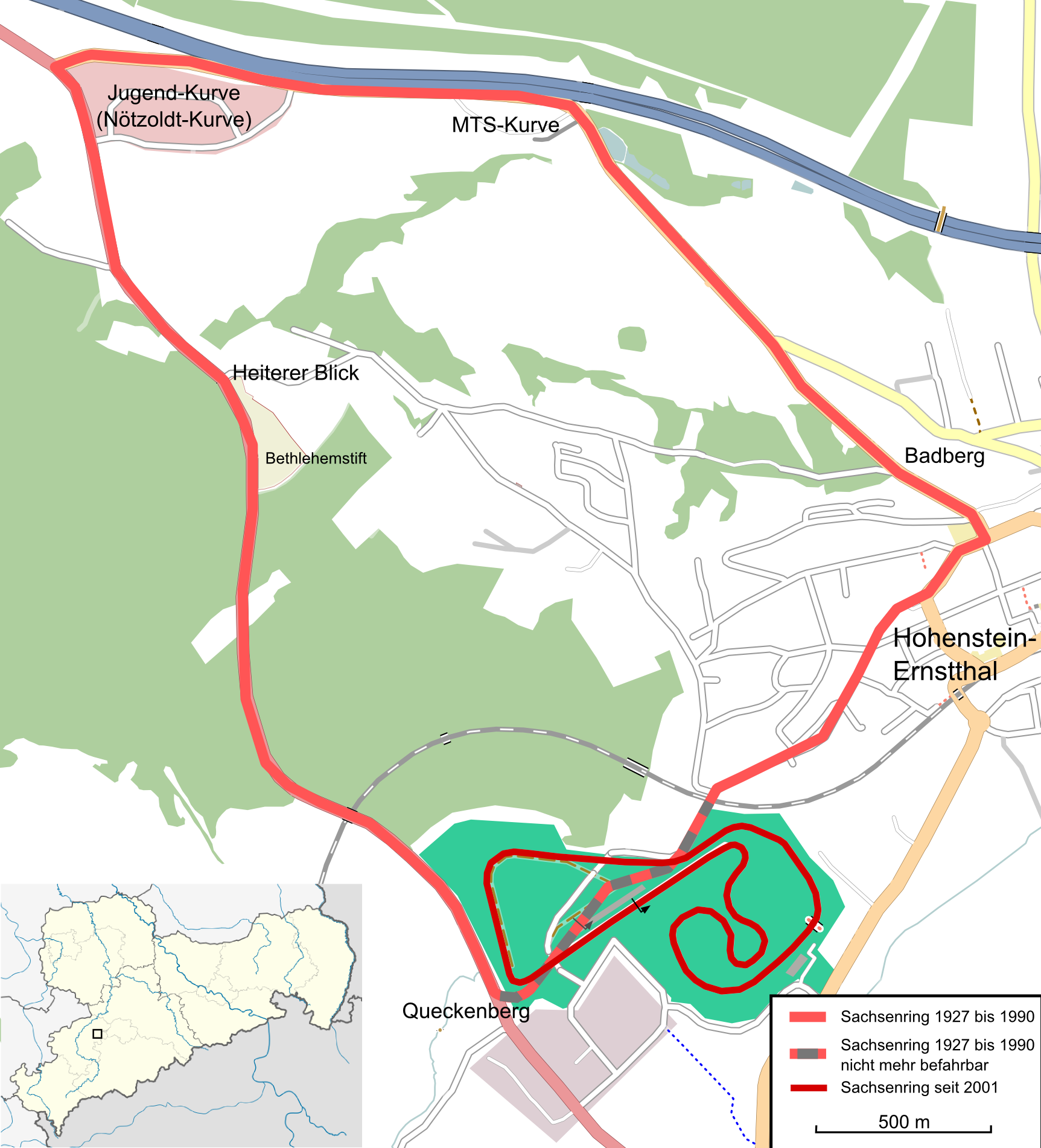
Comparison of original and modern layouts of Sachsenring

The first race was held on 26 May 1927 on an 8.618 km (5.355 mi) layout on public roads, running also through the village of Hohenstein-Ernstthal itself. It was dubbed "Sachsenring" in 1937.

The East German motorcycle Grand Prix was held there from 1961 to 1972. The local two stroke MZ bikes of Zschopau were competitive during this time. The quickest lap was achieved by 15 time World Champion Giacomo Agostini on a MV Agusta with a 180 km/h (110 mph) average. After West German Dieter Braun won in 1971 and the East German fans sang the West German National Anthem in celebration (as is the case in sport, the winner's National Anthem is played after the event), the event was limited to East European entrants for political reasons.

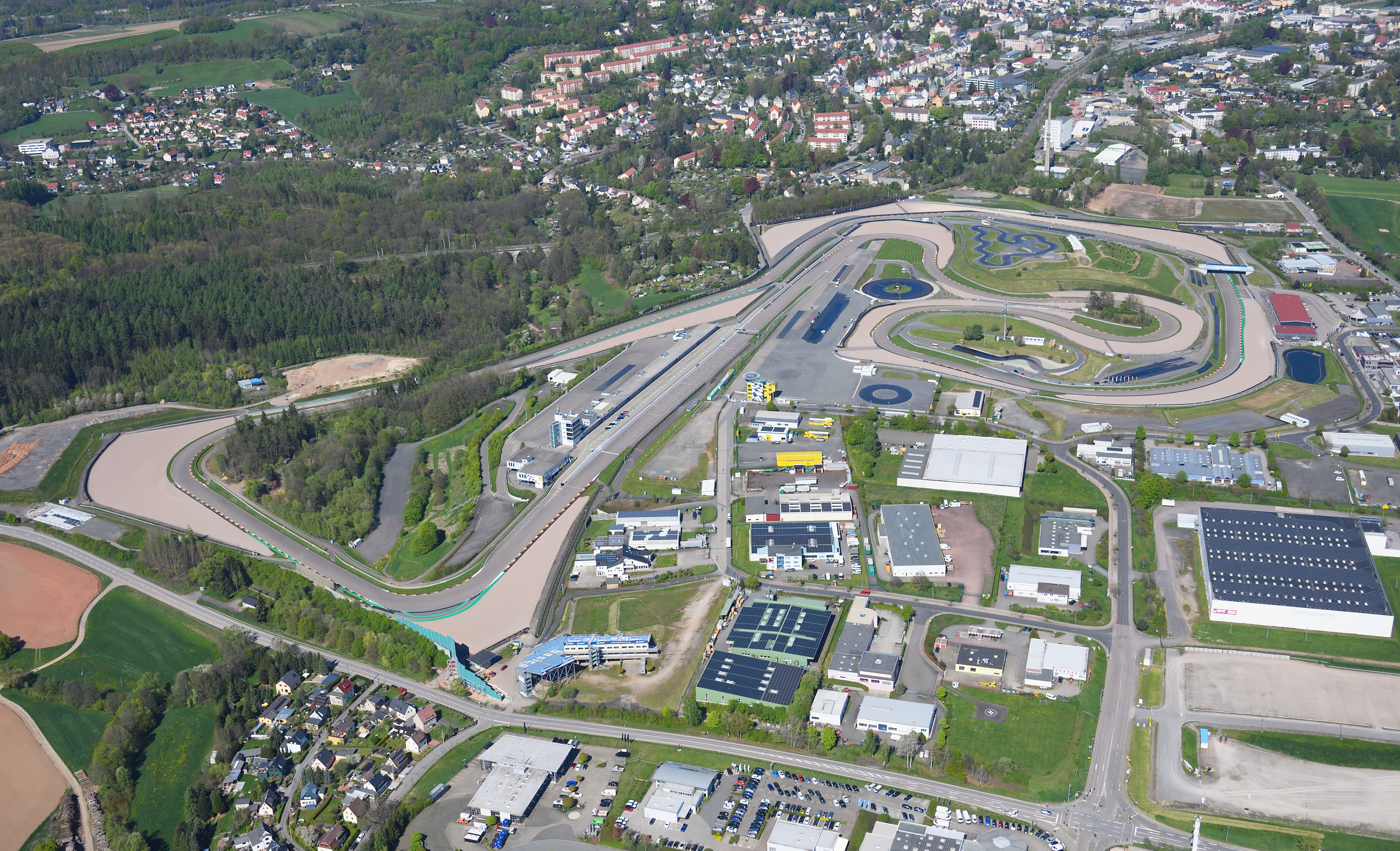
Aerial view

In 1990, with faster Western machinery now available, racing through the village became too dangerous with some fatalities (this can be compared with the Isle of Man TT).

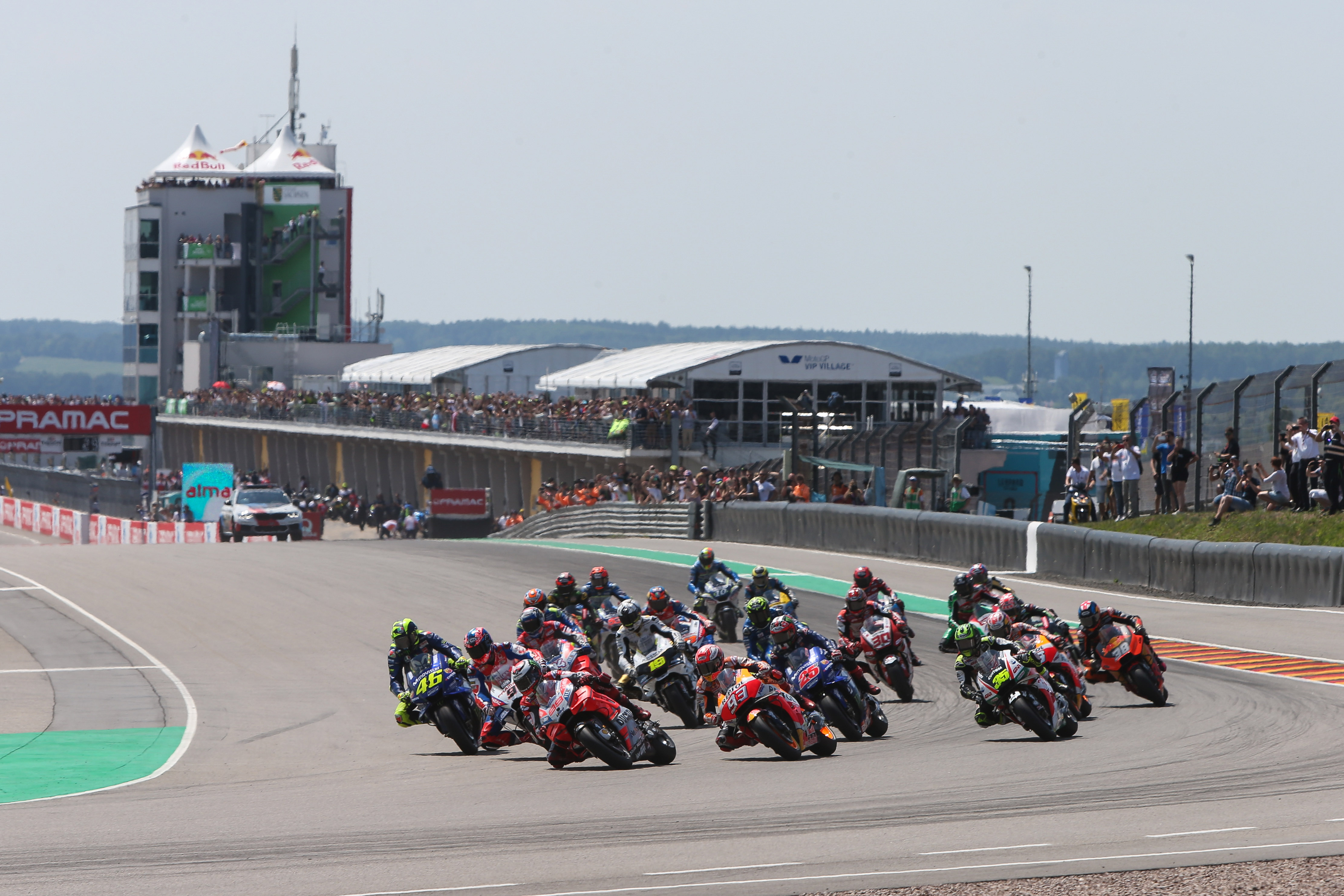
Main straight

To accelerate redevelopment of eastern Germany in the new unified Germany, a 3.517 km (2.185 mi) short track berg corner was built in the 1990s to bring international motorsport to the eastern part of Germany. In 1996, IDM motorcycle racing and the ADAC Super Tourenwagen Cup resumed racing here. The DTM raced here in 2000, with Klaus Ludwig winning at age 51, but the DTM did not return after 2002, preferring international venues. DTM returned to Sachsenring in 2023 after its take-over by ADAC due to its preference of using national venues again.

Since 1998, the German motorcycle Grand Prix moved to the Sachsenring from Nürburgring. In recent years, the track has been made faster and longer again, with the length now being 3.671 km (2.281 mi). Since 2007, the Sachsenring is part of the regular schedule of ADAC GT Masters. In 2011 the FIA GT1 World Championship held one of its race weekends at the Sachsenring.

== Layout history ==
Sachsenring layout history
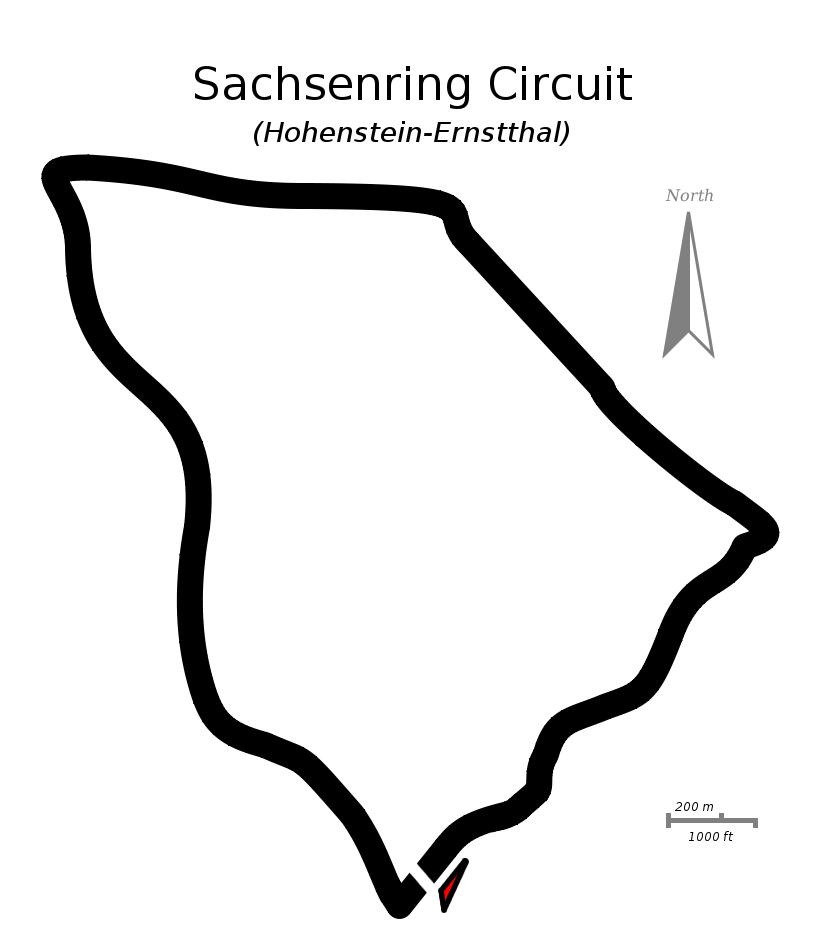
Original Circuit (1927–1990)

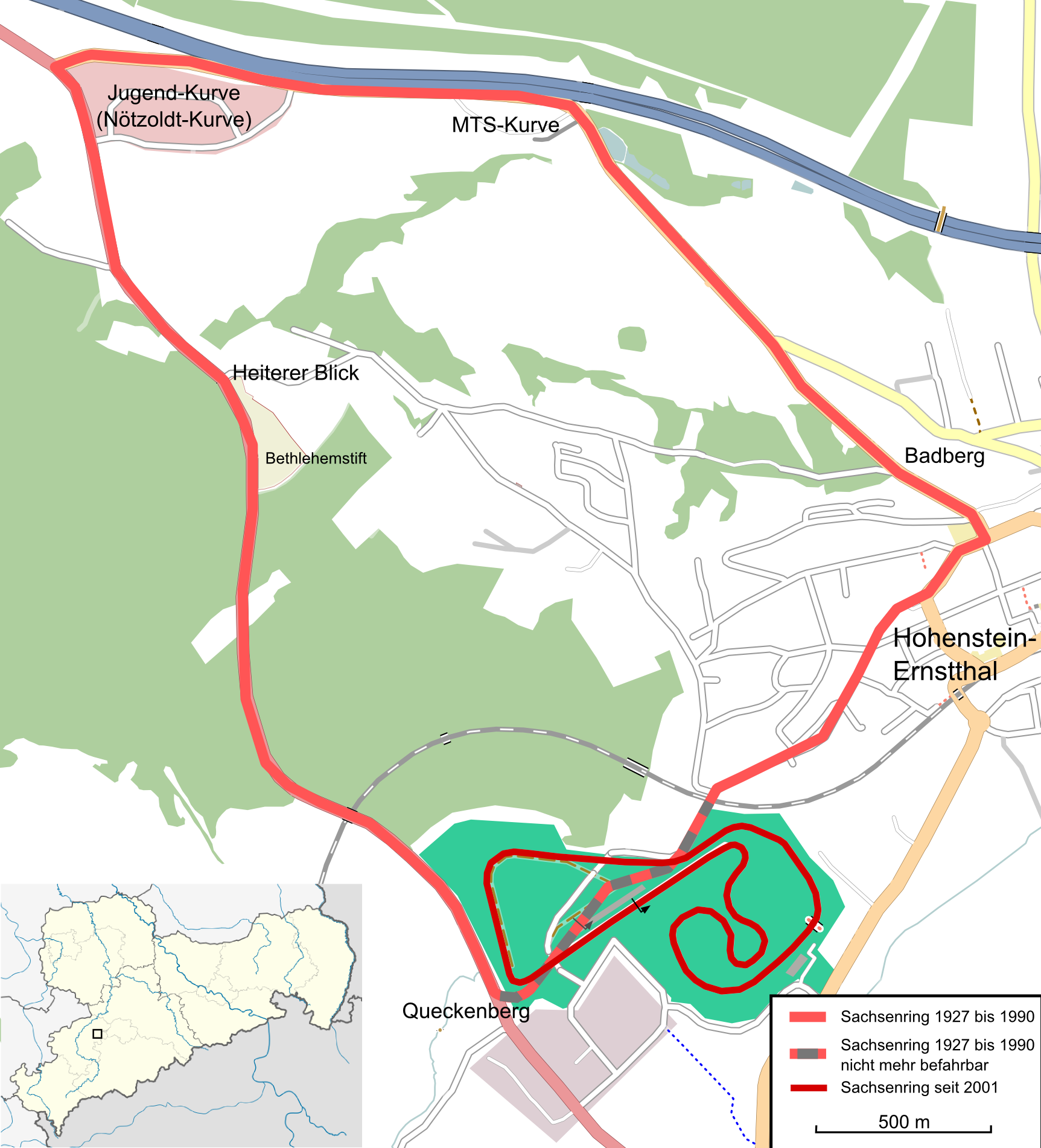
Comparison of original and modern layouts of Sachsenring

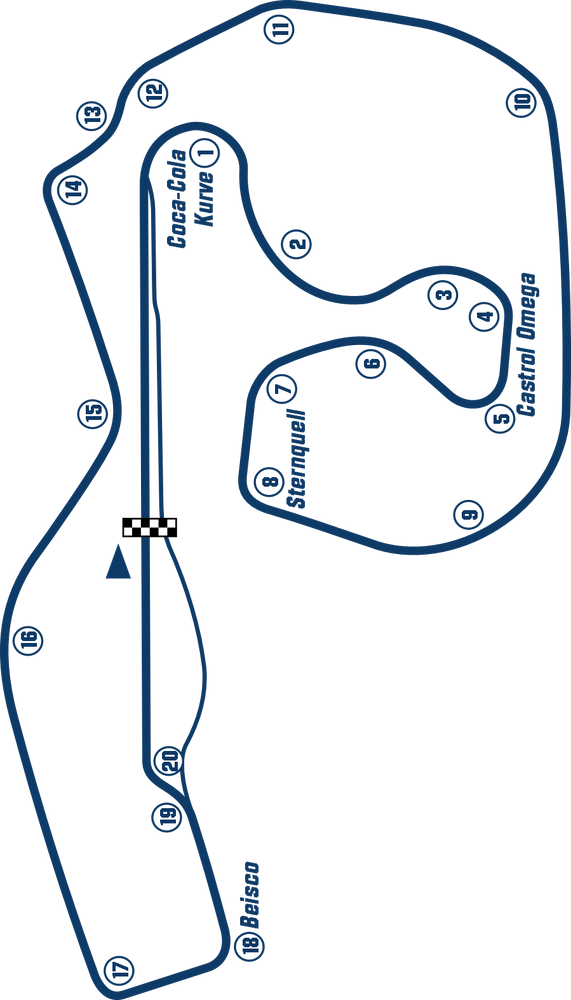
Grand Prix Circuit (1998–1999)

Grand Prix Circuit (2001–2002)

Grand Prix Circuit (2003–present)

== Most wins ==
=== Grand Prix motorcycle racing ===
Marc Márquez has won 125cc class once and Moto2 class twice and MotoGP class ten times, making him winning 13 times overall at this venue.

# Wins	Rider	Years won
13	(Spain) Marc Márquez	2010, 2011, 2012, 2013, 2014, 2015, 2016, 2017, 2018, 2019, 2021, 2025, 2026

== Events ==
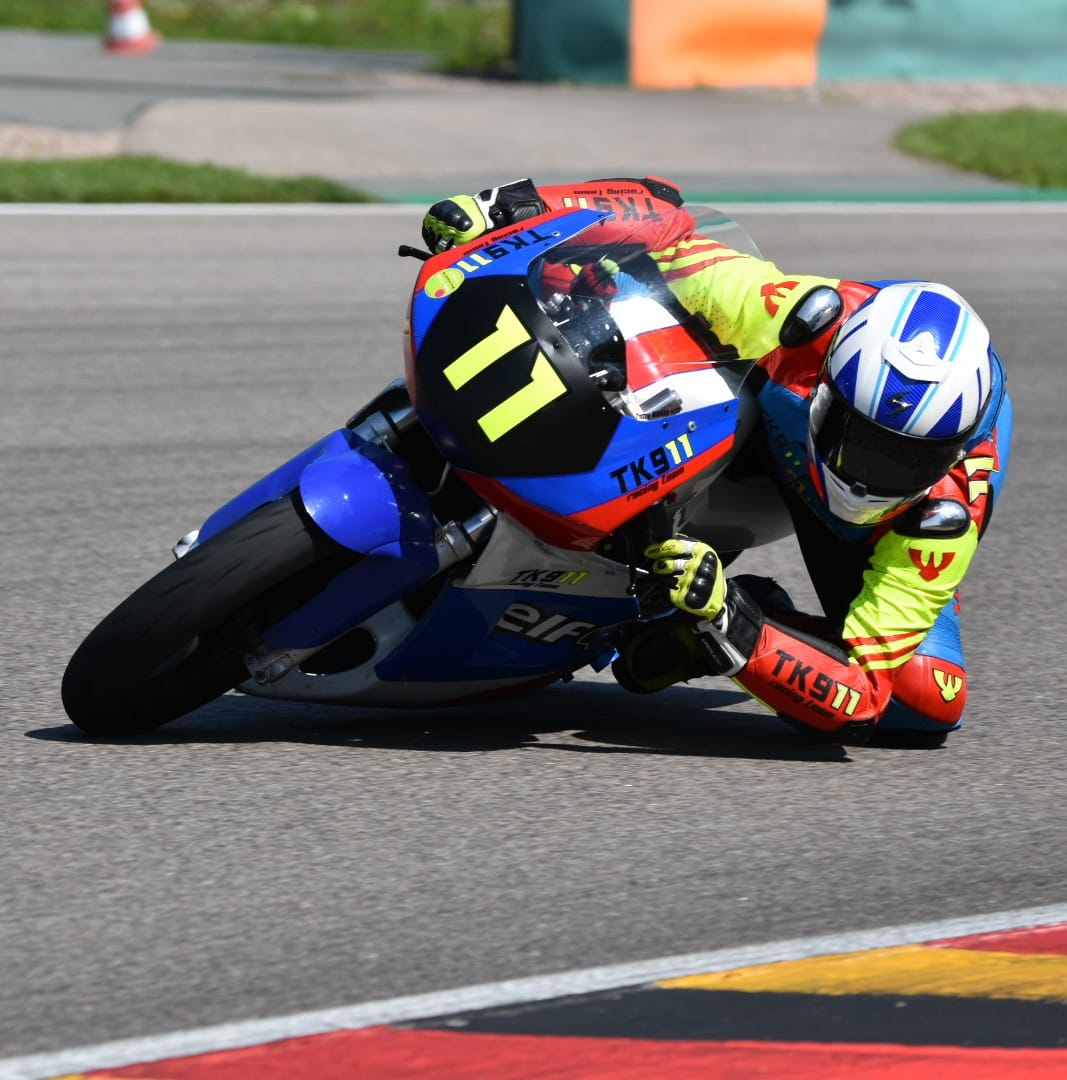
MZ-Cup - Supermono amateur competition series with MZ Skorpion since 1996 (Sachsenring 2020)

Current

- May: Euro-Moto Superbike Championship
- July: Grand Prix motorcycle racing German motorcycle Grand Prix, Red Bull MotoGP Rookies Cup, Moto4 Northern Cup
- September: Deutsche Tourenwagen Masters, ADAC GT4 Germany

Future

- ADAC GT Masters (2007–2023, 2027)
- F4 Germany Championship (2015–2017, 2019, 2021, 2027)
- Porsche Carrera Cup Germany (1999–2002, 2014, 2017–2025, 2027)

Former

- ADAC Formel Masters (2008–2014)
- ADAC TCR Germany Touring Car Championship (2016–2022)
- Austria Formula 3 Cup (1998, 2005)
- FIA ETCR – eTouring Car World Cup (2022)
- FIA GT1 World Championship (2011)
- Formula BMW ADAC (2000–2002)
- Formula Renault 2.0 Germany (2004–2005)
- German Formula Three Championship (1997–2002, 2004–2005, 2007–2014)
- Grand Prix motorcycle racing
  - East German motorcycle Grand Prix (1961–1972)
- MotoE World Championship
  - German eRace (2019, 2023–2024)
- NXT Gen Cup (2024–2025)
- Prototype Cup Germany (2024)
- Sidecar World Championship (2005–2014, 2018, 2023–2024)
- Super Tourenwagen Cup (1996–1999)
- V8Star Series (2003)

== Lap records ==
As of July 2026, the fastest official race lap records at the Sachsenring are listed as:

Category	Time	Driver	Vehicle	Event
Grand Prix Circuit (2003–present): 3.671 km (2.281 mi)
Formula Three	1:13.714	Frédéric Vervisch	Dallara F306	2008 Sachsenring German F3 round
LMP3	1:17.547	Keanu Al Azhari	Duqueine D-08	2024 Sachsenring Prototype Cup Germany round
Formula 4	1:18.362	Fabio Scherer	Tatuus F4-T014	2017 Sachsenring ADAC Formula 4 round
GT3	1:18.603	Luca Stolz	Mercedes-AMG GT3	2017 Sachsenring ADAC GT Masters round
GT1	1:19.602	Mike Hezemans	Chevrolet Corvette C6.R	2011 Sachsenring FIA GT1 round
MotoGP	1:20.667	Jorge Martín	Ducati Desmosedici GP24	2024 German motorcycle Grand Prix
Formula Renault 2.0	1:21.413	Colin Fleming	Tatuus FR2000	2004 Sachsenring Formula Renault 2000 Germany round
ADAC Formel Masters	1:21.715	Pascal Wehrlein	Dallara Formulino	2011 Sachsenring ADAC Formel Masters round
Superbike	1:22.134	Lukas Tulovic	Ducati Panigale V4 R	2026 Sachsenring Euro-Moto Superbike round
Moto2	1:22.248	Daniel Holgado	Kalex Moto2	2026 German motorcycle Grand Prix
Porsche Carrera Cup	1:22.629	Laurin Heinrich	Porsche 911 (992 I) GT3 Cup	2022 Sachsenring Porsche Carrera Cup Germany round
Supersport	1:24.428	Dirk Geiger	Yamaha YZF-R9	2026 Sachsenring Euro-Moto Supersport round
250cc	1:24.552	Álvaro Bautista	Aprilia RSA 250	2009 German motorcycle Grand Prix
Moto3	1:25.227	Máximo Quiles	KTM RC250GP	2026 German motorcycle Grand Prix
MotoE	1:26.522	Héctor Garzó	Ducati V21L	2024 German motorcycle Grand Prix
TCR Touring Car	1:26.749	Luca Engstler	Hyundai i30 N TCR	2018 Sachsenring TCR Germany round
125cc	1:26.909	Gábor Talmácsi	Aprilia RS125R	2007 German motorcycle Grand Prix
GT4	1:27.061	Mike David Ortmann	Aston Martin Vantage AMR GT4	2022 Sachsenring ADAC GT4 round
Sportbike	1:28.394	Jakob Rosenthaler	Triumph Daytona 660	2026 Sachsenring Euro-Moto Sportbike round
ETCR	1:30.251	Maxime Martin	Alfa Romeo Giulia ETCR	2022 Sachsenring FIA ETCR round
Supersport 300	1:31.779	Iñigo Iglesias	Kawasaki Ninja 400	2023 Sachsenring IDM Supersport 300 round
NXT Gen Cup	1:41.666	Victor Nielsen	LRT NXT1	2024 Sachsenring NXT Gen Cup round
Grand Prix Circuit (2001–2002): 3.704 km (2.302 mi)
Formula Three	1:17.151	Kosuke Matsuura	Dallara F301	2001 Sachsenring German F3 round
DTM	1:21.221	Michael Bartels	Opel Astra DTM	2002 Sachsenring DTM round
Formula BMW	1.25.988	Maximilian Götz	Mygale FB02	2002 Sachsenring Formula BMW ADAC round
MotoGP	1:26.226	Valentino Rossi	Honda RC211V	2002 German motorcycle Grand Prix
500cc	1:26.808	Shinya Nakano	Yamaha YZR500	2001 German motorcycle Grand Prix
250cc	1:27.233	Marco Melandri	Aprilia RSV250	2001 German motorcycle Grand Prix
Porsche Carrera Cup	1:29.125	Roland Asch	Porsche 911 (996 I) GT3 Cup	2001 Sachsenring Porsche Carrera Cup Germany round
125cc	1:29.486	Steve Jenkner	Aprilia RS125R	2002 German motorcycle Grand Prix
Grand Prix Circuit (2000): 3.386 km (2.104 mi)
Formula Three	1:14.394	Alex Müller	Dallara F300	2000 Sachsenring German F3 round
DTM	1:19.971	Marcel Fässler	Mercedes-Benz AMG CLK DTM	2000 Sachsenring DTM round
250cc	1:23.575	Olivier Jacque	Yamaha YZR250	2000 German motorcycle Grand Prix
500cc	1:23.918	Tadayuki Okada	Honda NSR500	2000 German motorcycle Grand Prix
125cc	1:26.150	Youichi Ui	Derbi RS125R	2000 German motorcycle Grand Prix
Porsche Carrera Cup	1:26.620	Roland Asch	Porsche 911 (996 I) GT3 Cup	2000 Sachsenring Porsche Carrera Cup Germany round
Grand Prix Circuit (1998–1999): 3.508 km (2.180 mi)
Formula Three	1:20.078	Bas Leinders	Dallara F397	1998 Sachsenring German F3 round
500cc	1:28.072	Alex Barros	Honda NSR500	1999 German motorcycle Grand Prix
Super Touring	1:28.384	Christian Abt	Audi A4 Quattro	1999 Sachsenring STW Cup round
250cc	1:28.625	Tetsuya Harada	Aprilia RSV 250	1998 German motorcycle Grand Prix
125cc	1:30.159	Emilio Alzamora	Honda RS125R	1999 German motorcycle Grand Prix
Grand Prix Circuit (1996–1997): 3.517 km (2.185 mi)
Formula Three	1:24.416	Timo Scheider	Dallara F397	1997 Sachsenring German F3 round
Super Touring	1:31.800	Laurent Aïello	Peugeot 406	1997 Sachsenring STW Cup round
Grand Prix Circuit (1927–1990): 8.618 km (5.355 mi)
500cc	2:55.400	Giacomo Agostini	MV Agusta 500 Three	1968 East German motorcycle Grand Prix
350cc	2:59.200	Giacomo Agostini	MV Agusta 350 3C	1971 East German motorcycle Grand Prix
250cc	3:01.100	Jarno Saarinen	Yamaha 250 V4	1972 East German motorcycle Grand Prix
125cc	3:12.200	Bill Ivy	Yamaha AS1	1968 East German motorcycle Grand Prix
Formula Three	3:12.200	Kurt Ahrens Jr.	Brabham BT18	1966 Sachsenringrennen
Formula Junior	3:21.700	Willy Lehmann	SEG - Wartburg	1963 Sachsenring East German Formula Junior round
50cc	3:41.200	Jan de Vries	Kreidler 50 GP	1972 East German motorcycle Grand Prix
Formula Two	3:44.600	Fritz Riess	AFM 3	1950 Sachsenringrennen

== Spectators at the MotoGP since 1998 ==
Year	Spectators	Growth
1998	142,000	
1999	151,000	+ 6.34%
2000	161.000	+ 6.62%
2001	177,000	+ 9.94%
2002	184,500	+ 4.24%
2003	204,000	+ 10.57%
2004	207,745	+ 1.84%
2005	216,457	+ 4.19%
2006	219,848	+ 1.57%
2007	226,944	+ 3.23%
2008	221,492	2.40%
2009	214,711	3,06%
2010	224,668	+ 4.64%
2011	230,133	+ 2.4%
2012	195,695	15%
2013	204,491	+ 4.5%
2014	209,408	+ 2.4%
2015	211,588	+ 1%

== Bibliography ==
- Wolfgang Hallmann: Das war der Sachsenring – Geschichte und Gegenwart einer legendären Rennstrecke; Chemnitzer Verlag, Chemnitz; 1996; ISBN 3-928678-32-9
