= NXT Gen Cup =

Electric touring car competition

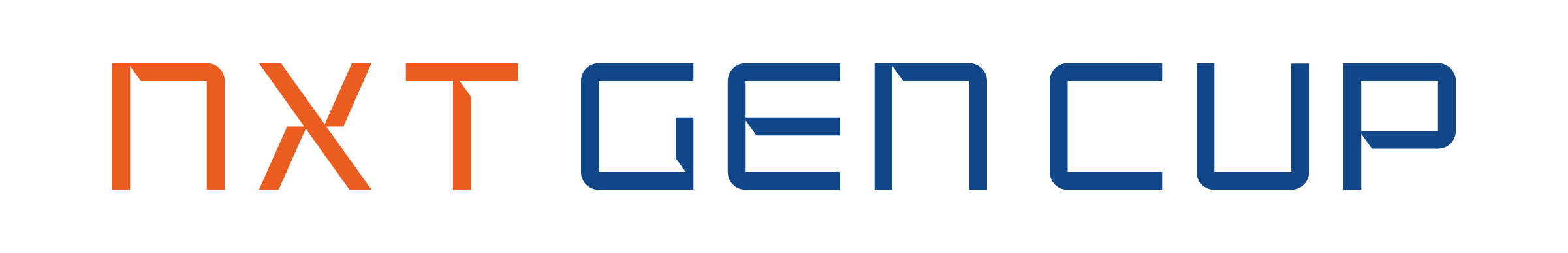
- Category: Touring car racing Electric motorsport
- Inaugural season: 2023
- Tyre suppliers: Hankook (2023–present)
- Drivers' champion: (Netherlands) Lukas Stiefelhagen
- Official website: www.nxtgencup.com

The NXT Gen Cup is the world’s first fully electric junior touring car cup. It was founded in 2023 by Fredrik Lestrup and Lestrup Racing Team.

== History ==
The NXT Gen Cup was created in 2023 as the world's first all-electric junior touring car series to provide a platform for young drivers, both male and female, to develop their racing careers in a sustainable and accessible way. It aims to bridge the gap between karting and professional racing, offering an "arrive-and-drive" package to ensure equal machinery and lower costs for competitors.

On 8 February 2024 it was announced that NXT Gen Cup would run as a support of the 2023–24 Formula E World Championship during four rounds, but the plan was cancelled and the races held were supporting the 2024 Deutsche Tourenwagen Masters.

The one-make series used the LRT NXT1, a racecar developed by QEV Technologies based on the Mini Cooper SE. It featured a 170 kilowatts (230 hp) electric motor and a 30 kWh battery.

== Champions ==
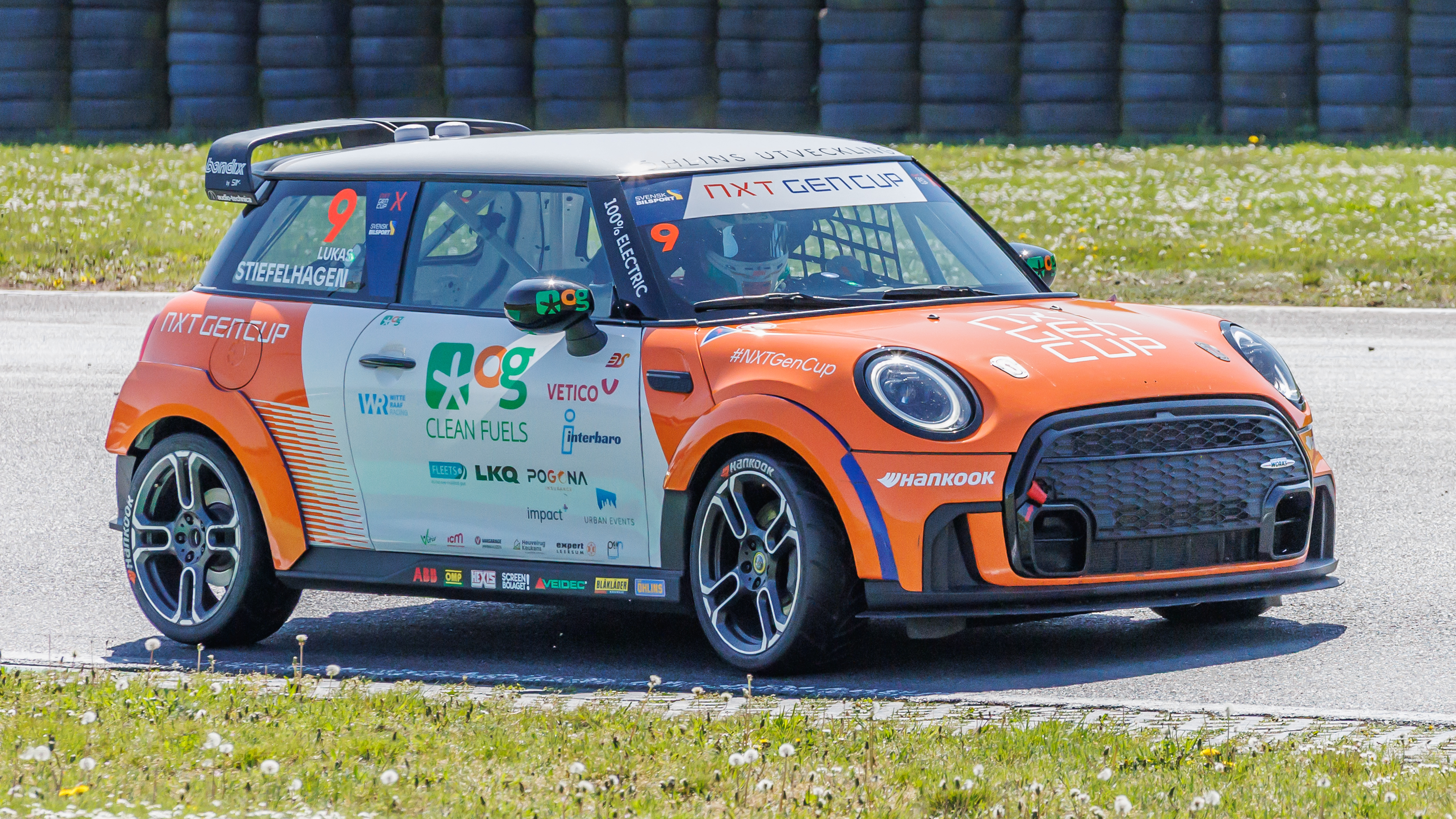
Lukas Stiefelhagen's 2025 Mini

Season	Driver	Poles	Wins	Podiums	Fastest laps	Points	Clinched	Margin
2023	(Sweden) Elias Adestam	2	5	7	1	243	Race 12 of 12	2
2024	(Netherlands) Calvin de Groot	1	6	11	1	345	Race 13 of 13	10
2025	(Netherlands) Lukas Stiefelhagen	2	7	12	2	368	Race 14 of 14	83

== Circuits ==
- (Sweden) Falkenbergs Motorbana (2023)
- (Germany) Motorsport Arena Oschersleben (2023, 2025)
- (Germany) Nürburgring (2023–2025)
- (Sweden) Karlskoga Motorstadion (2023)
- (Sweden) Ring Knutstorp (2023)
- (Sweden) Mantorp Park (2023)
- (Germany) Norisring (2024–2025)
- (Germany) Sachsenring (2024–2025)
- (Germany) Hockenheimring (2024)

== See also ==
- Electric motorsport
