= Binder (surname) =

There are several origins of the name, among them the shortened forms of German occupational names like "Fassbinder" or "Buchbinder" (i.e. Bookbinder). Also an old English name relating to Binders that bound barrels made by Coopers. Binder also has origins in Indian and Jewish culture.

== Notable people surnamed Binder ==
- Abraham Binder (1895–1966), American composer
- Brad Binder (born 1995), South African motorcycle racer
- Charles A. Binder (1857–1891), American politician from New York
- Claudia Kristofics-Binder (born 1961), Austrian figure skater
- Darryn Binder (born 1998), South African motorcycle racer
- David Binder (1931–2019), British-born American journalist
- Eando Binder, pseudonym used by American writing duo Earl Andrew Binder (1904–1965) and Otto Binder (1911–1974)
- Eberhard Binder (1924–1998), German illustrator
- Elisabeth Binder, doctor and neuroscientist
- Franz Binder (1911–1989), Austrian football player and trainer
- Hans Binder (born 1948), Austrian racing car driver
- Herbert Binder (born 1932), Swiss sport shooter
- Julius Binder (1870–1939), German jurist
- Karin Binder (born 1957), German politician
- Károly Binder (born 1956), Hungarian jazz pianist
- Maurice Binder (1925–1991), American film technician
- Max Binder (born 1947), Swiss politician
- Mike Binder (born 1958), American film director, writer and actor
- Otto Binder (1911–1974), American writer
- Paul Binder (1902–1981), German politician
- Reinhold Binder (born 1978), Austrian politician
- René Binder (born 1992), Austrian racing driver
- Richard Binder (1839–1912), American Medal of Honor recipient
- Seán Binder (born 1996), German human rights activist and rescue diver
- Sebastian Binder (1792–1845), Austrian opera singer
- Stefan Binder (born 1978), German football player
- Tom Binder (1889–1969), English football player

== See also ==
- Raj Binder, a character played by Shaun Majumder
- Pinder (disambiguation)
- Fassbinder
