= Marie Magdalena Frey =

Czech actress (c.1812–1870)

Marie Magdalena Frey (c. 1812–1870) was an actress. She was engaged at the Estates Theatre in Prague in 1834–1870, where she belonged to the theatre's star attractions. She was known for her roles as heroine, main parts in salon dramas and later her mother parts.

== Biography ==
She was one of eight children of the actor Bernard Jakob Frey (1784–1836) and the actress Elisabeth Frey and the sister of August Johann Frey (1829–1897). She married the actor Friedrich Frey (1824–1892) in 1854.

She made her debut as a child in her father's theater company in Graz. In 1831–33 she was active in Brno, in 1833–34 in Vienna, and 1834, she was engaged in the Estates Theatre in Prague. She was a celebrated leading lady in the roles of sentimental heroine in romantic dramas and tragedies of the theatre and was often given the main female parts, but she also frequently played boys in breeches roles. She was praised for her memorizing technique and was also able to sing, though she preferred to act in drama and avoided prominent roles as a singer. She performed exclusively in the German language. She was ranked among the highest paid actors of the theatre alongside Ferdinand Polawsky, Margarethe Binder, Franz Feistmantel and Franz Rudolf Bayer, and in the 1840s, she was the highest paid female actor in Prague.

She supported her mother and her siblings on her salary after the death of her father in 1836. Despite the low social status of an actor in the 19th century, Marie Magdalena Frey enjoyed respect also as a private person and was noted to socialize with the noble families in Prague, which was unusual for an actress of her time. She was respected also in Austria and Germany, where she made several guest appearances to assist her mother and siblings financially. Aside from her acting, she was also engaged to recite on festivities and celebrations, such as on the visit of the emperor in June 1854.

Her most celebrated role was reportedly the title role in Salomon Hermann Mosenthal's Deborah. From the 1850s, she progressed to roles as socialites and mother, and became particularly popular in the roles of dignified mother figures. From 1854, she was allowed to take out her pension allowance, but she continued to act. In 1864, she was celebrated for her thirty years onstage. She belonged to the most noted actors in 19th-century Bohemia.
