= André Rudersdorf =

German racing driver (born 1995)

André Rudersdorf (born 9 September 1995 in Hadamar) is a German racing driver. In 2013, he started in the FIA European Formula Three Championship series.

== Career ==
Rudersdorf began his racing career in karting in 2003. He remained in karting until 2010. In 2011, he began his formula racing career. He competed in the ADAC Formel Masters and concluded the season in 19th position in the championship. In 2012, Rudersdorf got a cockpit at ma-con in the German Formula Three Championship. He competed in an older-spec car and therefore he was eligible for the trophy standing. In this class, he won 14 of 21 races and reached the trophy championship. Furthermore, he started in the Austrian Formula Three Championship. He won seven of 14 races and won the championship with 212 to 185 points in front of Sandro Zeller.

In 2013, Rudersdorf stayed at ma-con and switched to the FIA European Formula Three Championship.

== Racing record ==
=== Career summary ===
Season	Series	Team	Races	Wins	Poles	F/Laps	Podiums	Points	Position
2011	ADAC Formel Masters	Krafft Walzen	24	0	0	0	0	12	19th
2012	German Formula 3 Championship - Trophy	ma-con	21	14	0	0	20	377	1st
2012	Austria Formula 3 Cup	ma-con	12	7	7	0	12	212	1st
2013	FIA Formula 3 European Championship	ma-con	30	0	0	0	0	3	24th

Sporting positions
Preceded by Sandro Zeller	Austria Formula 3 Cup champion 2012	Succeeded by Christopher Höher
