= 2012 German Formula Three Championship =

Seasons
- ← 2011 2013 →

The 2012 ATS Formel 3 Cup was the tenth edition of the German F3 Cup and the inaugural edition with one-make Volkswagen Power Engines. The Cup class is open for cars built between 2008 and 2011 and equipped with the new Volkswagen engine, while cars built between 2002 and 2007 with conventional Formula Three engines will race in the Trophy class. The season began on 4 May at Circuit Park Zandvoort and ended on 30 September at Hockenheim after nine race weekends, totalling 27 races.

Lotus driver Jimmy Eriksson became the first and only Swedish driver to win the championship. He clinched the title after taking points in the Hockenheim qualifying. He surpassed champion of the Rookie class Lucas Auer and Kimiya Sato by 110 and 127 respectively points. André Rudersdorf won the Trophy class, as his main rival Luca Stolz stepped up to the Cup class in the second half of the season.

== Teams and drivers ==
Team	Chassis	Engine	No.	Driver	Status	Rounds
Cup Class
(Netherlands) Van Amersfoort Racing	Dallara F308/006	VW Power Engine	1	(Austria) René Binder		All
(Netherlands) Van Amersfoort Racing	Dallara F308/007	VW Power Engine	2	(Austria) Lucas Auer	R	All
(Netherlands) Van Amersfoort Racing	Dallara F308/011	VW Power Engine	3	(Netherlands) Dennis van de Laar	R	1–3, 5–9
(Netherlands) Van Amersfoort Racing	Dallara F308/011	VW Power Engine	5	(Germany) Daniel Abt		4
(Sweden) Performance Racing	Dallara F310/002	VW Power Engine	9	(Germany) Luca Stolz		5–9
(Sweden) Performance Racing	Dallara F310/002	VW Power Engine	10	(Sweden) John Bryant-Meisner	R	1
(Sweden) Performance Racing	Dallara F308/020	VW Power Engine	11	(Switzerland) Yannick Mettler		All
(Sweden) Performance Racing	Dallara F308/092	VW Power Engine	25	(Australia) Mitchell Gilbert	R	All
(Germany) Lotus	Dallara F308/099	VW Power Engine	14	(Sweden) Jimmy Eriksson		All
(Germany) Lotus	Dallara F311/002	VW Power Engine	15	(Russia) Artem Markelov	R	All
(Germany) Lotus	Dallara F308/098	VW Power Engine	16	(Japan) Kimiya Sato		All
(Germany) Lotus	Dallara F308/096	VW Power Engine	17	(United Kingdom) Sheban Siddiqi	R	All
(Italy) EuroInternational	Dallara F308/057	VW Power Engine	18	(Italy) Michela Cerruti		6–9
(Italy) EuroInternational	Dallara F311/001	VW Power Engine	19	(United Kingdom) Tom Blomqvist		2–4, 6, 8
(Italy) EuroInternational	Dallara F311/001	VW Power Engine	20	(Israel) Alon Day		9
(Italy) ADM Motorsport	Dallara F308/072	VW Power Engine	27	(Israel) Alon Day		5–8
(Italy) ADM Motorsport	Dallara F308/029	VW Power Engine	28	(Switzerland) Zoël Amberg		6
Trophy Class
(Germany) Rhino's Leipert Motorsport	Dallara F304/012	Opel	52	(Italy) Luca Iannaccone		All
(Belgium) APEX Engineering	Dallara F305/034	OPC-Challenge	54	(Belgium) Jordi Weckx		All
(Germany) Rennsport Rössler	Dallara F306/016	OPC-Challenge	58	(Switzerland) Dominik Kocher		1–4, 6–9
(Austria) HS Engineering	Dallara F305/037	Volkswagen	63	(Germany) Luca Stolz		1–4
(Germany) ma-con	Dallara F305/030	Volkswagen	66	(Germany) André Rudersdorf	R	1–4, 6–8
(Austria) Michael Aberer	Dallara F306/034	Volkswagen	68	(Austria) Michael Aberer		9
(Austria) Franz Wöss Racing	Dallara F305/062	OPC-Challenge	72	(Germany) Maximilian Hackl		6
(Austria) Franz Wöss Racing	Dallara F302/033	Opel	78	(France) Sylvain Warnecke		6

Icon	Status
R	Rookie

== Race calendar and results ==
The 2012 calendar consists of nine meetings, of which five take place on German soil while neighbouring Netherlands, Belgium and Austria will host the remaining four rounds. The F3 Cup will be part of the ADAC Masters Weekend package seven times; GAMMA Race Day at Assen is once again part of the German F3 schedule with an International Superstars Series support round at Spa-Francorchamps. The series will adopt a format used in British Formula 3 and the Formula 3 Euro Series, with three races a weekend, two of which held on the Saturday and the final race on the Sunday.

Round		Circuit	Date	Pole position	Fastest lap	Winning driver	Winning team	Secondary Class winner
1	R1	(Netherlands) Circuit Park Zandvoort	5 May	(Austria) Lucas Auer	(Austria) Lucas Auer	(Sweden) Jimmy Eriksson	(Germany) Lotus	T: (Germany) Luca Stolz; R: (Austria) Lucas Auer
1	R2	(Netherlands) Circuit Park Zandvoort	5 May		(Japan) Kimiya Sato	(Switzerland) Yannick Mettler	(Sweden) Performance Racing	T: (Belgium) Jordi Weckx; R: (Sweden) John Bryant-Meisner
1	R3	(Netherlands) Circuit Park Zandvoort	6 May	(Austria) Lucas Auer	(Japan) Kimiya Sato	(Japan) Kimiya Sato	(Germany) Lotus	T: (Belgium) Jordi Weckx; R: (Australia) Mitchell Gilbert
2	R1	(Germany) Sachsenring	9 June	(Japan) Kimiya Sato	(Japan) Kimiya Sato	(Japan) Kimiya Sato	(Germany) Lotus	T: (Germany) Luca Stolz; R: (Russia) Artem Markelov
2	R2	(Germany) Sachsenring	9 June		(Russia) Artem Markelov	(Austria) René Binder	(Netherlands) Van Amersfoort Racing	T: (Germany) Luca Stolz; R: (Russia) Artem Markelov
2	R3	(Germany) Sachsenring	10 June	(United Kingdom) Tom Blomqvist	(Japan) Kimiya Sato	(Japan) Kimiya Sato	(Germany) Lotus	T: (Germany) André Rudersdorf; R: (Austria) Lucas Auer
3	R1	(Germany) Oschersleben	7 July	(Sweden) Jimmy Eriksson	(Sweden) Jimmy Eriksson	(Sweden) Jimmy Eriksson	(Germany) Lotus	T: (Germany) André Rudersdorf; R: (Australia) Mitchell Gilbert
3	R2	(Germany) Oschersleben	7 July		(Japan) Kimiya Sato	(Japan) Kimiya Sato	(Germany) Lotus	T: (Germany) Luca Stolz; R: (Russia) Artem Markelov
3	R3	(Germany) Oschersleben	8 July	(Sweden) Jimmy Eriksson	(Sweden) Jimmy Eriksson	(Sweden) Jimmy Eriksson	(Germany) Lotus	T: (Germany) Luca Stolz; R: (Austria) Lucas Auer
4	R1	(Belgium) Circuit de Spa-Francorchamps*	14 July	(Japan) Kimiya Sato	(Sweden) Jimmy Eriksson	(Sweden) Jimmy Eriksson	(Germany) Lotus	T: (Germany) André Rudersdorf; R: (Australia) Mitchell Gilbert
4	R2	(Belgium) Circuit de Spa-Francorchamps*	14 July		(Sweden) Jimmy Eriksson	(United Kingdom) Tom Blomqvist	(Italy) EuroInternational	T: (Germany) André Rudersdorf; R: (Russia) Artem Markelov
4	R3	(Belgium) Circuit de Spa-Francorchamps*	15 July	(Japan) Kimiya Sato	(Austria) René Binder	(Austria) René Binder	(Netherlands) Van Amersfoort Racing	T: (Germany) André Rudersdorf; R: (Austria) Lucas Auer
5	R1	(Netherlands) TT Circuit Assen*	3 August	(Sweden) Jimmy Eriksson	(Sweden) Jimmy Eriksson	(Sweden) Jimmy Eriksson	(Germany) Lotus	T: (Belgium) Jordi Weckx; R: (Netherlands) Dennis van de Laar
5	R2	(Netherlands) TT Circuit Assen*	4 August		(Sweden) Jimmy Eriksson	(Australia) Mitchell Gilbert	(Sweden) Performance Racing	T: (Belgium) Jordi Weckx; R: (Australia) Mitchell Gilbert
5	R3	(Netherlands) TT Circuit Assen*	5 August	(Sweden) Jimmy Eriksson	(Australia) Mitchell Gilbert	(Sweden) Jimmy Eriksson	(Germany) Lotus	T: (Belgium) Jordi Weckx; R: (Austria) Lucas Auer
6	R1	(Austria) Red Bull Ring	11 August	(United Kingdom) Tom Blomqvist	(Australia) Mitchell Gilbert	(United Kingdom) Tom Blomqvist	(Italy) EuroInternational	T: (Germany) André Rudersdorf; R: (Australia) Mitchell Gilbert
6	R2	(Austria) Red Bull Ring	11 August		(Austria) Lucas Auer	(Austria) Lucas Auer	(Netherlands) Van Amersfoort Racing	T: (Germany) André Rudersdorf; R: (Austria) Lucas Auer
6	R3	(Austria) Red Bull Ring	12 August	(United Kingdom) Tom Blomqvist	(Sweden) Jimmy Eriksson	(United Kingdom) Tom Blomqvist	(Italy) EuroInternational	T: (Germany) André Rudersdorf; R: (Austria) Lucas Auer
7	R1	(Germany) Lausitzring	25 August	(Australia) Mitchell Gilbert	(Australia) Mitchell Gilbert	(Australia) Mitchell Gilbert	(Sweden) Performance Racing	T: (Germany) André Rudersdorf; R: (Australia) Mitchell Gilbert
7	R2	(Germany) Lausitzring	25 August		(Australia) Mitchell Gilbert	(Russia) Artem Markelov	(Germany) Lotus	T: (Germany) André Rudersdorf; R: (Russia) Artem Markelov
7	R3	(Germany) Lausitzring	26 August	(Australia) Mitchell Gilbert	(Austria) Lucas Auer	(Austria) Lucas Auer	(Netherlands) Van Amersfoort Racing	T: (Germany) André Rudersdorf; R: (Austria) Lucas Auer
8	R1	(Germany) Nürburgring	15 September	(United Kingdom) Tom Blomqvist	(United Kingdom) Tom Blomqvist	(United Kingdom) Tom Blomqvist	(Italy) EuroInternational	T: (Germany) André Rudersdorf; R: (Austria) Lucas Auer
8	R2	(Germany) Nürburgring	15 September		(Japan) Kimiya Sato	(Austria) René Binder	(Netherlands) Van Amersfoort Racing	T: (Germany) André Rudersdorf; R: (Australia) Mitchell Gilbert
8	R3	(Germany) Nürburgring	16 September	(United Kingdom) Tom Blomqvist	(Japan) Kimiya Sato	(United Kingdom) Tom Blomqvist	(Italy) EuroInternational	T: (Germany) André Rudersdorf; R: (Austria) Lucas Auer
9	R1	(Germany) Hockenheimring	29 September	(Sweden) Jimmy Eriksson	(Sweden) Jimmy Eriksson	(Sweden) Jimmy Eriksson	(Germany) Lotus	T: (Switzerland) Dominik Kocher; R: (Australia) Mitchell Gilbert
9	R2	(Germany) Hockenheimring	29 September		(Austria) Lucas Auer	(Russia) Artem Markelov	(Germany) Lotus	T: (Switzerland) Dominik Kocher; R: (Russia) Artem Markelov
9	R3	(Germany) Hockenheimring	30 September	(Sweden) Jimmy Eriksson	(Sweden) Jimmy Eriksson	(Sweden) Jimmy Eriksson	(Germany) Lotus	T: (Switzerland) Dominik Kocher; R: (Austria) Lucas Auer

^{*} The rounds at Spa and Assen will be invitation rounds.

== Championship standings ==
=== Cup ===
- Cars built over the period of 2008–2011, and equipped with the Volkswagen Power Engine are eligible for Cup points.
- Cars built between 2002 and 2007 are eligible for Trophy points; points are awarded as follows:

	1	2	3	4	5	6	7	8	9	10	PP	FL
Races 1 & 3	25	18	15	12	10	8	6	4	2	1	**3**	3
Race 2	10	8	6	5	4	3	2	1	0	0	**0**	3

Pos	Driver	ZAN (Netherlands)			SAC (Germany)			OSC (Germany)			SPA (Belgium)			ASS (Netherlands)			RBR (Austria)			LAU (Germany)			NÜR (Germany)			HOC (Germany)			Pts
Cup Class
1	(Sweden) Jimmy Eriksson	1	5	6	2	3	4	**1**	3	**1**	1	2	4	**1**	6	**1**	11	4	3	2	3	6	4	Ret	3	**1**	3	**1**	408
2	(Austria) Lucas Auer	**2**	DNS	**4**	6	Ret	2	4	9	2	5	Ret	5	9	4	2	5	1	2	4	4	1	2	4	2	8	2	3	298
3	(Japan) Kimiya Sato	Ret	6	1	**1**	2	1	5	1	Ret	**13**	5	**3**	3	5	3	6	15	5	11	9	3	3	6	11	2	Ret	2	281
4	(Australia) Mitchell Gilbert	3	4	2	7	8	6	2	DSQ	8	4	7	6	7	1	8	2	2	7	**1**	6	**2**	6	2	4	3	4	4	277
5	(United Kingdom) Tom Blomqvist				3	4	**3**	3	6	10	2	1	2				**1**	9	**1**				**1**	Ret	**1**				222
6	(Austria) René Binder	4	2	13†	8	1	7	6	4	7	3	6	1	2	Ret	7	DNS	5	9	5	2	7	8	1	Ret	7	5	9	191
7	(Russia) Artem Markelov	Ret	9	Ret	4	5	DSQ	8	5	3	8	4	14†	5	7	6	8	8	10	6	1	8	5	5	6	4	1	6	155
8	(Switzerland) Yannick Mettler	5	1	DNS	5	14	DSQ	7	2	4	6	8	8	10	8	9	9	3	6	7	5	5	9	14	5	Ret	Ret	5	131
9	(Netherlands) Dennis van de Laar	10	10	3	9	13	11	9	7	6				4	9	4	17†	12	4	9	8	Ret	10	8	7	5	6	7	110
10	(Germany) Luca Stolz													8	2	5	4	Ret	8	3	10	4	7	3	9	12	7	8	85
11	(Israel) Alon Day													6	3	Ret	3	6	13	10	11	Ret	11	7	8	6	Ret	Ret	48
12	(United Kingdom) Sheban Siddiqi	11	11	9	Ret	10	12	11	11	11	14†	11	10	12	10	Ret	7	13	15	13	15	12	15	12	12	9	9	10	30
13	(Sweden) John Bryant-Meisner	7	3	5																									24
14	(Germany) Daniel Abt										7	3	7																18
15	(Italy) Michela Cerruti																12	16	12	12	12	10	12	10	14	11	10	12	3
16	(Switzerland) Zoël Amberg																DNS	DNS	DNS										0
Trophy Class
1	(Germany) André Rudersdorf	9	8	8	11	7	9	10	10	13	9	9	9				10	7	11	8	7	9	13	9	10				377
2	(Belgium) Jordi Weckx	8	7	7	Ret	9	13	13	14	9	11	Ret	DNS	11	11	10	16	11	16	14	13	14	14	11	13				300
3	(Switzerland) Dominik Kocher	12	12	11	Ret	11	14	14	12	Ret	12	12	11				14	14	17	15	14	11	16	13	15	10	8	11	268
4	(Italy) Luca Iannaccone	13	13	12	12	12	15	15	DSQ	12	15	14	12	13	12	11	15	18	19	16	16	13	WD	WD	WD	13	12	14	252
5	(Germany) Luca Stolz	6	DNS	10	10	6	10	12	8	5	10	10	13†																184
6	(Germany) Maximilian Hackl																13	10	14										44
7	(France) Sylvain Warnecke																Ret	17	18										14
Guest driver ineligible for points
	(Austria) Michael Aberer																									14	11	13	0
Pos	Driver	ZAN (Netherlands)			SAC (Germany)			OSC (Germany)			SPA (Belgium)			ASS (Netherlands)			RBR (Austria)			LAU (Germany)			NÜR (Germany)			HOC (Germany)			Pts

Colour	Result
Gold	Winner
Silver	Second place
Bronze	Third place
Green	Points classification
Blue	Non-points classification
Blue	Non-classified finish (NC)
Purple	Retired, not classified (Ret)
Red	Did not qualify (DNQ)
Red	Did not pre-qualify (DNPQ)
Black	Disqualified (DSQ)
White	Did not start (DNS)
White	Withdrew (WD)
White	Race cancelled (C)
Blank	Did not practice (DNP)
Blank	Did not arrive (DNA)
Blank	Excluded (EX)

**Bold** – Pole
Italics – Fastest Lap

- † — Drivers did not finish the race, but were classified as they completed over 90% of the race distance.

=== SONAX Rookie-Pokal ===
Rookie drivers are only eligible for the SONAX Rookie-Pokal title, if they have not previously competed in more than two events of national or international Formula 3 racing, and are 25 years old or younger in 2012.

Pos	Driver	ZAN (Netherlands)			SAC (Germany)			OSC (Germany)			SPA (Belgium)			ASS (Netherlands)			RBR (Austria)			LAU (Germany)			NÜR (Germany)			HOC (Germany)			Pts
1	(Austria) Lucas Auer	2	DNS	4	6	Ret	2	4	9	2	5	Ret	5	9	4	2	5	1	2	4	4	1	2	4	2	8	2	3	414
2	(Australia) Mitchell Gilbert	3	4	2	7	8	6	2	DSQ	8	4	7	6	7	1	8	2	2	7	1	6	2	6	2	4	3	4	4	399
3	(Russia) Artem Markelov	Ret	9	Ret	4	5	DSQ	8	5	3	8	4	14†	5	7	6	8	8	10	6	1	8	5	5	6	4	1	6	291
4	(Germany) Luca Stolz	6	DNS	10	10	6	10	12	8	5	10	10	13†	8	2	5	4	Ret	8	3	10	4	7	3	9	12	7	8	254
5	(Netherlands) Dennis van de Laar	10	10	3	9	13	11	9	7	6				4	9	4	17†	12	4	9	8	Ret	10	8	7	5	6	7	227
6	(Germany) André Rudersdorf	9	8	8	11	7	9	10	10	13	9	9	9				10	7	11	8	7	9	13	9	10				171
7	(United Kingdom) Sheban Siddiqi	11	11	9	Ret	10	12	11	11	11	14†	11	10	12	10	Ret	7	13	15	13	15	12	15	12	12†	9	9	10	150
8	(Sweden) John Bryant-Meisner	7	3	5																									34
9	(Germany) Maximilian Hackl																13	10	14										16
Pos	Driver	ZAN (Netherlands)			SAC (Germany)			OSC (Germany)			SPA (Belgium)			ASS (Netherlands)			RBR (Austria)			LAU (Germany)			NÜR (Germany)			HOC (Germany)			Pts

- † — Drivers did not finish the race, but were classified as they completed over 90% of the race distance.
