= 2011 ADAC Formel Masters =

Motorsport season

Seasons
- ← 2010 2012 →

The 2011 ADAC Formel Masters season was the fourth season of the ADAC Formel Masters open wheel auto racing series in Germany. The points system for the 2011 season changed to match the system used by the FIA for other championships such as Formula One. Points were awarded to the top ten drivers in each race as follows: 25, 18, 15, 12, 10, 8, 6, 4, 2, and 1. Pascal Wehrlein won seven of the 24 races and won the drivers' championship. Motopark Academy won the teams' title after their drivers Emil Bernstorff, Artem Markelov, Kean Kristensen and Mario Farnbacher occupied second, fourth, fifth and sixth place respectively. Sven Müller was third.

== Teams and drivers ==
Team	No.	Drivers	Rounds
(Germany) ma-con Motorsport	1	(Germany) Mario Farnbacher	1
(Germany) ma-con Motorsport	2	(Germany) Sven Müller	All
(Germany) ma-con Motorsport	3	(Denmark) Dennis Lind	1–4
(Germany) ma-con Motorsport	5	(Germany) André Rudersdorf	5
(Germany) ma-con Motorsport	6	(Denmark) Christina Nielsen	5
(Germany) ma-con Motorsport	7	(Germany) Maximilian Buhk	6–8
(Germany) ma-con Motorsport	27	(New Zealand) Nick Cassidy	7
(Germany) Motopark Academy	1	(Germany) Mario Farnbacher	2–8
(Germany) Motopark Academy	22	(United Kingdom) Sheban Siddiqi	All
(Germany) Motopark Academy	23	(Denmark) Kean Kristensen	All
(Germany) Motopark Academy	24	(Russia) Artem Markelov	All
(Germany) Motopark Academy	25	(United Kingdom) Emil Bernstorff	All
(Germany) Krafft Walzen	4	(Germany) Niklas Brinkmann	1–4
(Germany) Krafft Walzen	5	(Germany) André Rudersdorf	1–4, 6–8
(Germany) Krafft Walzen	6	(Denmark) Christina Nielsen	1–4, 6–8
(Germany) KUG Motorsport	7	(Germany) Maximilian Buhk	1–5
(Germany) KUG Motorsport	8	(Austria) Kevin Friesacher	1–4
(Austria) Neuhauser Racing	9	(Sweden) Gustav Malja	All
(Austria) Neuhauser Racing	10	(Austria) David Griessner	1–5
(Austria) Neuhauser Racing	11	(Germany) Hubertus-Carlos Vier	All
(Austria) Neuhauser Racing	32	(Austria) Thomas Jäger	7
(Germany) Mücke Motorsport	12	(Germany) Jason Kremer	All
(Germany) Mücke Motorsport	14	(Israel) Roy Nissany	All
(Germany) KSW Motorsport	13	(Germany) Toni Koitsch	1–2, 4–8
(Germany) ADAC Berlin-Brandenburg e.V.	15	(Hungary) Márk Királykúti	1–6
(Germany) ADAC Berlin-Brandenburg e.V.	16	(Netherlands) Peter Hoevenaars	All
(Germany) ADAC Berlin-Brandenburg e.V.	17	(Germany) Pascal Wehrlein	All
(Germany) ADAC Berlin-Brandenburg e.V.	20	(Switzerland) Jeffrey Schmidt	7–8
(Germany) URD Rennsport	18	(Germany) Luca Stolz	All
(Germany) URD Rennsport	19	(Germany) Lucas Wolf	All
(Germany) HAITECH-Racing	20	(Switzerland) Jeffrey Schmidt	1–6
(Germany) HAITECH-Racing	21	(Austria) Marc Coleselli	1–3, 5–6
(Germany) G&J Motorsport	26	(Germany) Ferdinand Gabor	4, 8

== Race calendar and results ==
- The championship increased to eight rounds, one more than in 2010. Seven of eight race weekends were a part of the ADAC's Masters Weekend package, with an additional round at the Nürburgring to support the ADAC Truck Grand Prix.

Round		Circuit	Date	Pole position	Fastest lap	Winning driver	Winning team
1	R1	(Germany) Oschersleben	24 April	(Germany) Pascal Wehrlein	(United Kingdom) Emil Bernstorff	(Germany) Pascal Wehrlein	(Germany) ADAC Berlin-Brandenburg e.V.
1	R2	(Germany) Oschersleben	25 April		(United Kingdom) Emil Bernstorff	(United Kingdom) Emil Bernstorff	(Germany) Motopark Academy
1	R3	(Germany) Oschersleben	25 April		(Germany) Mario Farnbacher	(United Kingdom) Emil Bernstorff	(Germany) Motopark Academy
2	R1	(Germany) Sachsenring	14 May	(Germany) Pascal Wehrlein	(Germany) Pascal Wehrlein	(Germany) Pascal Wehrlein	(Germany) ADAC Berlin-Brandenburg e.V.
2	R2	(Germany) Sachsenring	15 May		(United Kingdom) Emil Bernstorff	(Germany) Sven Müller	(Germany) ma-con Motorsport
2	R3	(Germany) Sachsenring	15 May		(Germany) Pascal Wehrlein	(Germany) Sven Müller	(Germany) ma-con Motorsport
3	R1	(Belgium) Zolder	11 June	(Germany) Pascal Wehrlein	(Germany) Pascal Wehrlein	(Germany) Pascal Wehrlein	(Germany) ADAC Berlin-Brandenburg e.V.
3	R2	(Belgium) Zolder	12 June		(Russia) Artem Markelov	(Germany) Pascal Wehrlein	(Germany) ADAC Berlin-Brandenburg e.V.
3	R3	(Belgium) Zolder	12 June		(Russia) Artem Markelov	(Germany) Pascal Wehrlein	(Germany) ADAC Berlin-Brandenburg e.V.
4	R1	(Germany) Nürburgring	9 July	(Germany) Pascal Wehrlein	(United Kingdom) Emil Bernstorff	(Germany) Pascal Wehrlein	(Germany) ADAC Berlin-Brandenburg e.V.
4	R2	(Germany) Nürburgring	9 July		(Germany) Pascal Wehrlein	(Germany) Pascal Wehrlein	(Germany) ADAC Berlin-Brandenburg e.V.
4	R3	(Germany) Nürburgring	10 July		(United Kingdom) Emil Bernstorff	(United Kingdom) Emil Bernstorff	(Germany) Motopark Academy
5	R1	(Austria) Red Bull Ring	13 August	(Germany) Pascal Wehrlein	(Russia) Artem Markelov	(Denmark) Kean Kristensen	(Germany) Motopark Academy
5	R2	(Austria) Red Bull Ring	14 August		(Germany) Jason Kremer	(Denmark) Kean Kristensen	(Germany) Motopark Academy
5	R3	(Austria) Red Bull Ring	14 August		(United Kingdom) Emil Bernstorff	(Russia) Artem Markelov	(Germany) Motopark Academy
6	R1	(Germany) Lausitzring	3 September	(Germany) Sven Müller	(Germany) Mario Farnbacher	(Germany) Pascal Wehrlein	(Germany) ADAC Berlin-Brandenburg e.V.
6	R2	(Germany) Lausitzring	4 September		(Russia) Artem Markelov	(Denmark) Kean Kristensen	(Germany) Motopark Academy
6	R3	(Germany) Lausitzring	4 September		(Germany) Mario Farnbacher	(Germany) Mario Farnbacher	(Germany) Motopark Academy
7	R1	(Netherlands) TT Circuit Assen	17 September	(Germany) Pascal Wehrlein	(Germany) Hubertus-Carlos Vier	(United Kingdom) Emil Bernstorff	(Germany) Motopark Academy
7	R2	(Netherlands) TT Circuit Assen	18 September		(Germany) Maximilian Buhk	(United Kingdom) Emil Bernstorff	(Germany) Motopark Academy
7	R3	(Netherlands) TT Circuit Assen	18 September		(Germany) Sven Müller	(Germany) Sven Müller	(Germany) ma-con Motorsport
8	R1	(Germany) Hockenheimring	1 October	(Germany) Pascal Wehrlein	(United Kingdom) Emil Bernstorff	(Germany) Jason Kremer	(Germany) Mücke Motorsport
8	R2	(Germany) Hockenheimring	2 October		(United Kingdom) Emil Bernstorff	(Germany) Sven Müller	(Germany) ma-con Motorsport
8	R3	(Germany) Hockenheimring	2 October		(Germany) Luca Stolz	(Germany) Lucas Wolf	(Germany) URD Rennsport

== Championship standings ==
=== Drivers' Championship ===
- Points were awarded as follows:

1	2	3	4	5	6	7	8	9	10
25	18	15	12	10	8	6	4	2	1

Pos	Driver	OSC (Germany)			SAC (Germany)			ZOL (Belgium)			NÜR (Germany)			RBR (Austria)			LAU (Germany)			ASS (Netherlands)			HOC (Germany)			Pts
1	(Germany) Pascal Wehrlein	**1**	2	2	**1**	Ret	5	**1**	1	1	**1**	1	DSQ	**13**	3	DSQ	1	4	3	**6**	DSQ	5	**3**	5	Ret	331
2	(United Kingdom) Emil Bernstorff	2	1	1	5	2	4	5	4	Ret	2	2	1	3	2	11	17	21	Ret	1	1	2	11	2	18	310
3	(Germany) Sven Müller	4	3	3	2	1	1	6	3	3	5	4	3	DSQ	6	16	**8**	5	10	9	DSQ	1	2	1	2	296
4	(Russia) Artem Markelov	DNS	Ret	14	3	3	3	2	2	2	6	3	4	6	8	1	11	3	2	Ret	7	6	5	3	6	251
5	(Denmark) Kean Kristensen	5	5	5	12	Ret	10	7	5	5	7	5	5	1	1	2	3	1	4	13	6	15	15	Ret	8	215
6	(Germany) Mario Farnbacher	8	7	4	6	4	22	14	Ret	9	Ret	7	2	2	5	3	9	2	1	DNS	9	10	7	6	15	173
7	(Germany) Jason Kremer	16	10	8	7	18	25	Ret	6	Ret	8	13	8	5	4	Ret	4	7	16	10	4	4	1	16	3	132
8	(Germany) Lucas Wolf	18	9	19	Ret	Ret	20	Ret	8	Ret	9	8	7	7	17	8	5	8	19	2	2	7	8	8	1	117
9	(Germany) Maximilian Buhk	7	6	7	21	Ret	19	Ret	9	4	11	15	17	12	Ret	12	2	6	9	17	5	3	Ret	Ret	14	87
10	(Denmark) Dennis Lind	12	22	DNS	4	5	2	3	20	DNS	4	6	6													83
11	(Israel) Roy Nissany	3	4	9	10	11	7	Ret	16	8	3	23	9	Ret	10	4	10	12	13	Ret	17	18	Ret	17	5	81
12	(Germany) Luca Stolz	9	11	10	19	12	11	13	7	7	12	9	11	9	7	6	6	9	5	14	Ret	11	4	7	10	72
13	(Sweden) Gustav Malja	15	15	15	15	9	9	15	10	10	Ret	Ret	15	Ret	9	5	18	16	7	4	3	9	9	9	4	69
14	(Switzerland) Jeffrey Schmidt	6	8	6	11	7	6	4	19	DNS	10	12	12	4	18	Ret	Ret	19	14	18	10	13	10	10	13	62
15	(Germany) Hubertus-Carlos Vier	14	16	16	13	10	12	8	14	Ret	16	11	13	18	13	10	7	10	6	5	16	16	6	4	19	51
16	(Hungary) Márk Királykúti	22	14	21	Ret	16	14	9	12	6	18	14	20	11	19	7	13	18	15							16
17	(Austria) Thomas Jäger																			3	11	12				15
18	(Austria) Kevin Friesacher	11	12	11	8	6	24	11	11	DNS	14	16	14													12
19	(Germany) André Rudersdorf	19	18	13	16	Ret	17	18	Ret	15	21	17	16	15	Ret	9	12	11	8	11	13	14	17	11	7	12
20	(Germany) Toni Koitsch	13	20	Ret	22	Ret	21				17	21	23	10	14	14	19	20	18	7	12	20	13	12	9	9
21	(Germany) Niklas Brinkmann	17	13	12	14	8	8	10	Ret	Ret	Ret	19	18													9
22	(New Zealand) Nick Cassidy																			12	8	8				8
23	(Austria) Marc Coleselli	10	Ret	17	9	13	13	16	18	14				8	Ret	18	14	15	17							7
24	(Denmark) Christina Nielsen	20	19	22	18	17	18	12	Ret	13	20	22	21	16	11	13	15	17	12	8	15	17	14	Ret	12	4
25	(Netherlands) Peter Hoevenaars	21	17	18	20	15	15	17	13	12	13	10	10	14	16	19	Ret	13	11	16	14	19	12	15	16	2
26	(Austria) David Griessner	DNS	21	20	17	14	16	DSQ	15	11	15	Ret	22	17	12	17										0
27	(Germany) Ferdinand Gabor										22	18	19										16	14	11	0
28	(United Kingdom) Sheban Siddiqi	DNS	DNS	DNS	23	Ret	23	19	17	Ret	19	20	24	19	15	15	16	14	Ret	15	Ret	Ret	Ret	13	17	0
Pos	Driver	OSC (Germany)			SAC (Germany)			ZOL (Belgium)			NÜR (Germany)			RBR (Austria)			LAU (Germany)			ASS (Netherlands)			HOC (Germany)			Pts

Colour	Result
Gold	Winner
Silver	Second place
Bronze	Third place
Green	Points classification
Blue	Non-points classification
Blue	Non-classified finish (NC)
Purple	Retired, not classified (Ret)
Red	Did not qualify (DNQ)
Red	Did not pre-qualify (DNPQ)
Black	Disqualified (DSQ)
White	Did not start (DNS)
White	Withdrew (WD)
White	Race cancelled (C)
Blank	Did not practice (DNP)
Blank	Did not arrive (DNA)
Blank	Excluded (EX)

**Bold** – Pole
Italics – Fastest Lap

=== Teams' Championship ===
Pos	Team	OSC (Germany)			SAC (Germany)			ZOL (Belgium)			NÜR (Germany)			RBR (Austria)			LAU (Germany)			ASS (Netherlands)			HOC (Germany)			Pts
1	(Germany) Motopark Academy	2	1	1	3	2	3	2	2	2	2	2	1	1	1	1	3	1	1	1	1	2	5	2	6	748
1	(Germany) Motopark Academy	5	5	5	5	3	4	5	4	5	6	3	2	2	2	2	9	2	2	13	6	6	7	3	8	748
2	(Germany) ma-con Motorsport	4	3	3	2	1	1	3	3	3	4	4	3	15	6	9	2	5	9	9	5	1	2	1	2	485
2	(Germany) ma-con Motorsport	8	7	4	4	5	2	6	20	DNS	5	6	6	16	11	13	8	6	10	12	8	3	Ret	Ret	14	485
3	(Germany) ADAC Berlin-Brandenburg e.V. (Germany) Mücke Motorsport	1	2	2	1	15	5	1	1	1	1	1	10	11	3	7	1	4	3	6	10	5	3	5	13	374
3	(Germany) ADAC Berlin-Brandenburg e.V. (Germany) Mücke Motorsport	21	14	18	20	16	14	9	12	6	13	10	20	13	16	19	13	13	11	16	14	13	10	10	16	374
4	(Germany) RSC Mücke Motorsport	3	4	8	7	11	7	Ret	6	8	3	13	8	5	4	4	4	7	13	10	4	4	1	16	3	240
4	(Germany) RSC Mücke Motorsport	16	10	9	10	18	25	Ret	16	Ret	8	23	9	Ret	10	Ret	10	12	16	Ret	17	18	Ret	17	5	240
5	(Germany) URD Rennsport	9	9	10	19	12	11	13	7	7	9	8	7	7	7	6	5	8	5	2	2	7	4	7	1	236
5	(Germany) URD Rennsport	18	11	19	Ret	Ret	20	Ret	8	Ret	12	9	11	9	17	8	6	9	19	14	Ret	11	8	8	10	236
6	(Austria) Neuhauser Racing	14	15	15	13	9	9	8	10	10	15	11	13	17	9	5	7	10	6	3	3	9	6	4	4	155
6	(Austria) Neuhauser Racing	15	16	16	15	10	12	15	14	11	16	Ret	15	18	12	10	18	16	7	4	11	12	9	9	19	155
7	(Germany) HAITECH-Racing	6	8	6	9	7	6	4	18	14	10	12	12	4	18	18	14	15	14							81
7	(Germany) HAITECH-Racing	10	Ret	17	11	13	13	16	19	DNS				8	Ret	Ret	Ret	19	17							81
8	(Germany) KUG Motorsport	7	6	7	8	6	19	11	9	4	11	15	14	12	Ret	12										57
8	(Germany) KUG Motorsport	11	12	11	21	Ret	24	Ret	11	DNS	14	16	17													57
9	(Germany) Krafft Walzen	17	13	12	14	8	8	10	Ret	13	20	17	16				12	11	8	8	13	14	14	11	7	33
9	(Germany) Krafft Walzen	19	18	13	16	17	17	12	Ret	15	21	19	18				15	17	12	11	15	17	17	Ret	12	33
10	(Germany) KSW Motorsport	13	20	Ret	22	Ret	21				17	21	23	10	14	14	19	20	18	7	12	20	13	12	9	15
11	(Germany) G&J Motorsport										22	18	19										16	14	11	0
Pos	Team	OSC (Germany)			SAC (Germany)			ZOL (Belgium)			NÜR (Germany)			RBR (Austria)			LAU (Germany)			ASS (Netherlands)			HOC (Germany)			Pts

Colour	Result
Gold	Winner
Silver	Second place
Bronze	Third place
Green	Points classification
Blue	Non-points classification
Blue	Non-classified finish (NC)
Purple	Retired, not classified (Ret)
Red	Did not qualify (DNQ)
Red	Did not pre-qualify (DNPQ)
Black	Disqualified (DSQ)
White	Did not start (DNS)
White	Withdrew (WD)
White	Race cancelled (C)
Blank	Did not practice (DNP)
Blank	Did not arrive (DNA)
Blank	Excluded (EX)
