= Luca Stolz =

German racing driver

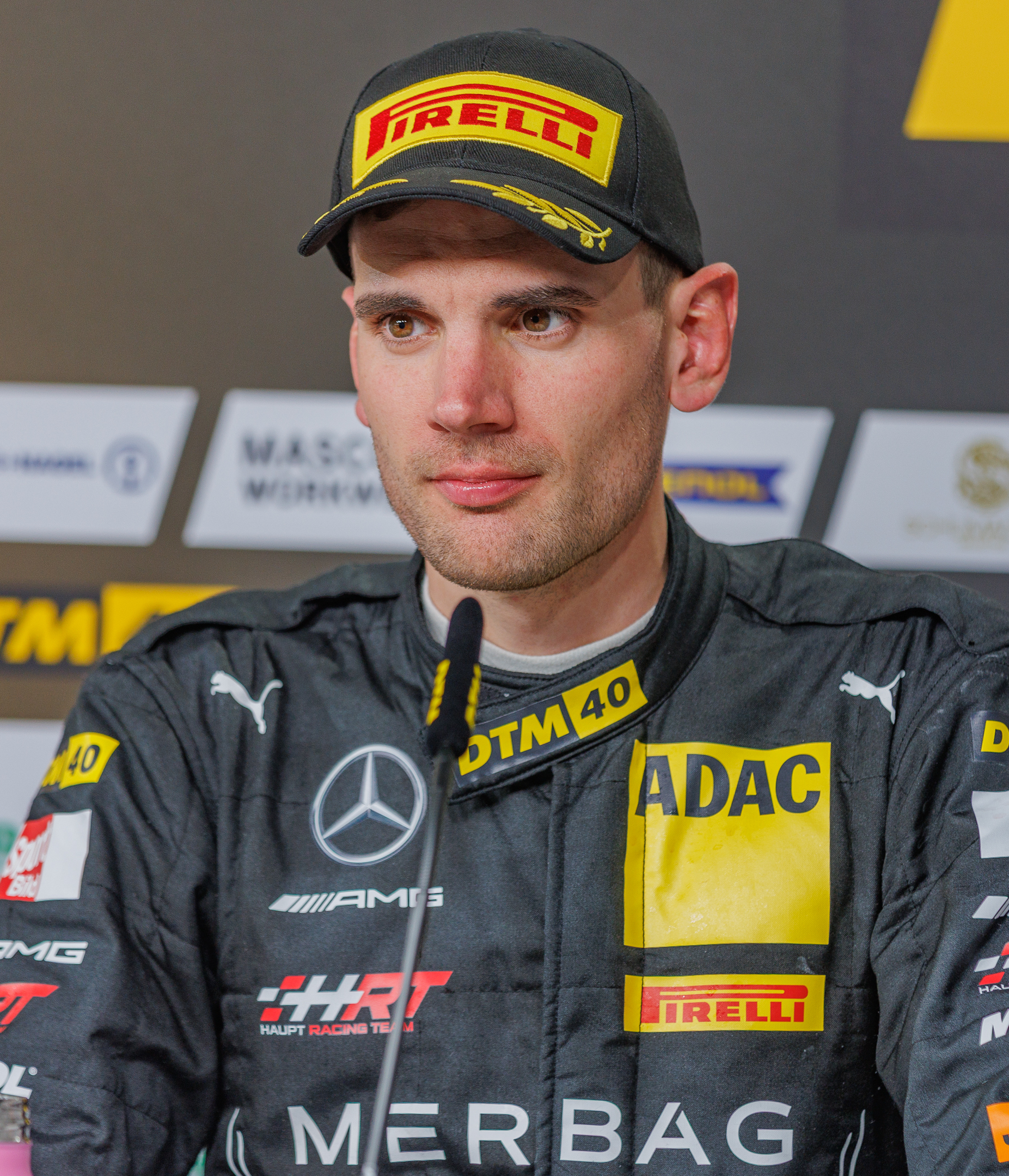
- Stolz in 2024
- Nationality: German
- Born: 29 July 1995 (age 31) Kirchen, Germany

ADAC GT Masters career
- Debut season: 2014
- Current team: Toksport WRT
- Categorisation: FIA Silver (until 2018); FIA Gold (2019–2022); FIA Platinum (2023–)
- Car number: 22
- Former teams: Team Zakspeed; GRT Grasser Racing Team; HTP Motorsport
- Starts: 104
- Wins: 2
- Podiums: 20
- Poles: 6
- Fastest laps: 3

Previous series
- 2011 2012 2013 2013: ADAC Formel Masters; ATS Formel 3 Cup; French GT Championship; Porsche Carrera Cup Germany

Championship titles
- 2016 2018, 2026: GT World Challenge Europe Sprint Cup – Silver Cup; GT World Challenge Europe Endurance Cup – Overall

Luca Stolz (born 29 July 1995) is a German racing driver who currently competes in the GT World Challenge Europe for Mercedes-AMG Team Mann-Filter. He has won the Bathurst 12 Hour twice (2022, 2023) and the 24 Hours of Nürburgring once (2026), and was previously the 2018 Blancpain GT Series Endurance Cup champion.

== Career ==
Stolz began his racing career in 2007, competing in the Cadet class of the Belgian Karting Championship. He raced in karts until 2010, before moving into single-seaters in 2011. He made his debut in the 2011 ADAC Formel Masters, driving for URD Rennsport. In his maiden season of formula competition, Stolz finished 12th in the championship. The following season, he moved to the German Formula Three Championship, initially competing in the Trophy class for HS Engineering, before stepping up to the overall championship beginning at TT Circuit Assen.

For 2013, Stolz began competing in sports car racing, joining Land Motorsport for the 2013 Porsche Carrera Cup Germany season. He made his GT World Challenge Europe Sprint Cup debut the following season, driving alongside Lucas Wolf for HTP Motorsport. Despite only competing in half the season, the duo would finish fourth in the Silver Cup class. For 2016, Stolz joined the Lamborghini GT3 Junior Program, which led to a full-season GT World Challenge Europe campaign with GRT Grasser Racing Team. Stolz and co-driver Michele Beretta were crowned Silver Cup champions of the Sprint Cup that season, claiming four class victories in ten races.

2017 saw Stolz join Mercedes-AMG Team Black Falcon for the Endurance Cup; the team with which he and co-drivers Yelmer Buurman and Maro Engel would claim the 2018 Blancpain GT Series Endurance Cup title.

2018 saw Stolz make his 24 Hours of Le Mans debut, driving for Keating Motorsports. The team finished 29th overall, and third in the LMGTE Am class. After competing with Black Falcon in 2019 and Haupt Racing Team in 2020, Stolz and Engel joined Toksport WRT for the 2021 season.

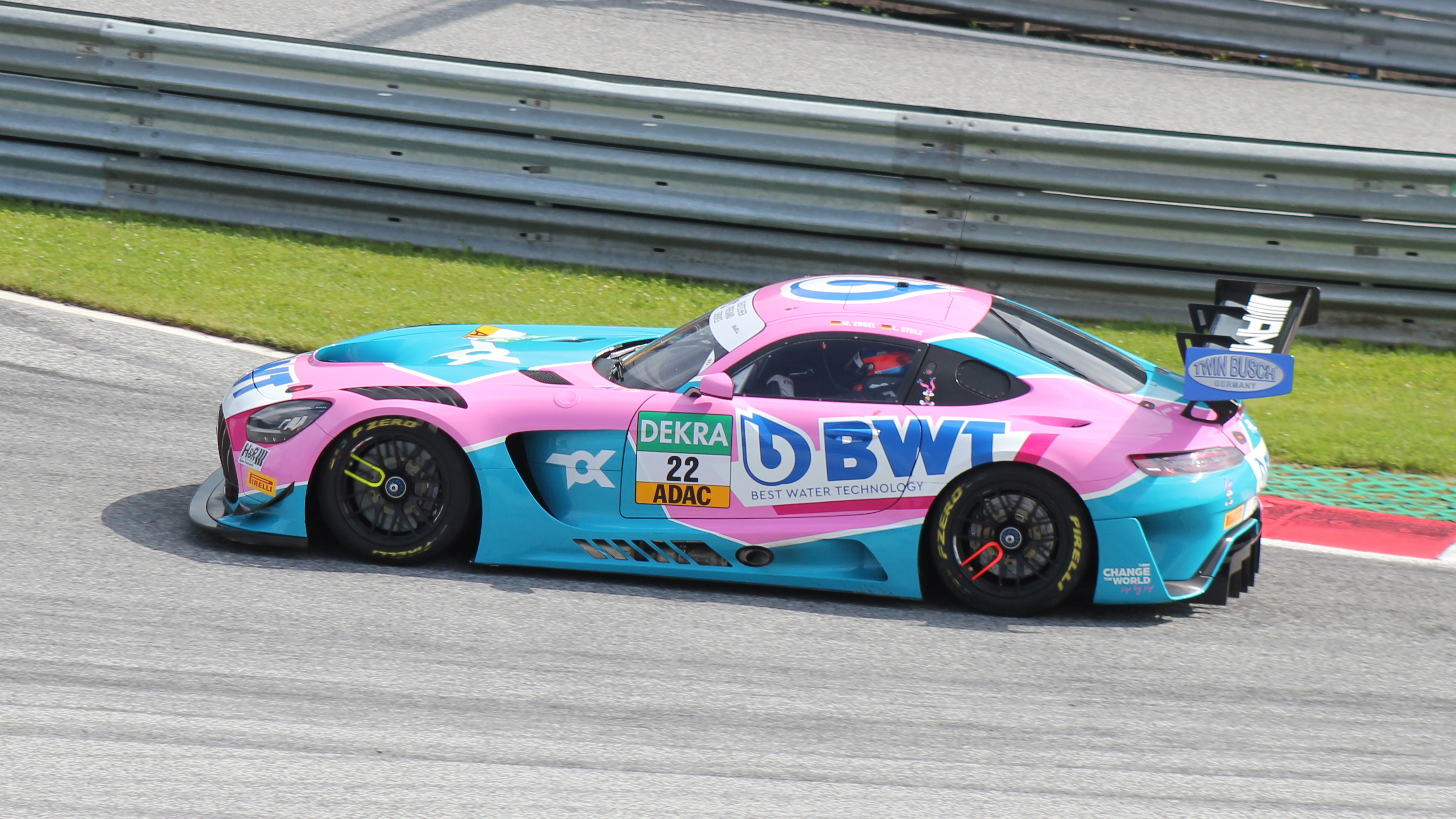
Stolz competing for Toksport WRT in 2021

In 2022, Stolz began competing in the DTM, driving for Haupt Racing Team. Throughout the season, he developed a reputation for staying out of the media limelight, preferring to essentially let his driving do the talking. He claimed his first DTM race win at the Nürburgring, taking victory in the second event of the weekend. 2022 also saw Stolz take victory at the Bathurst 12 Hour with Kenny Habul, Martin Konrad, and Jules Gounon. The following year, Stolz, Habul, and Gounon went back-to-back, winning the 2023 edition of the race as well. Stolz, Engel, and Mikaël Grenier added a victory at the Intercontinental GT Challenge season-ending Gulf 12 Hours, securing a second-place championship finish for Stolz. His primary program for 2023 involved a sophomore DTM drive, where he claimed four podiums and a race victory at the Sachsenring.

== Racing record ==
=== Career summary ===
Season	Series	Team	Races	Wins	Poles	F/Laps	Podiums	Points	Position
2011	ADAC Formel Masters	URD Rennsport	24	0	0	1	0	72	12th
2012	ATS Formel 3 Trophy	HS Engineering	12	5	4	5	10	184	5th
2012	ATS Formel 3 Cup	Performance Racing	18	0	0	0	3	85	10th
2013	Porsche Carrera Cup Germany	Land Motorsport	15	0	0	0	0	25	20th
2013	FFSA GT Championship	HTP Motorsport	2	0	1	0	2	0	NC
2014	Blancpain GT Sprint Series	HTP Motorsport	7	0	0	0	0	10	21st
2014	ADAC GT Masters	HTP Motorsport	16	0	0	0	1	36	24th
2015	ADAC GT Masters	HTP Motorsport	16	1	2	0	2	101	9th
2016	Blancpain GT Series Sprint Cup	GRT Grasser Racing Team	10	0	0	0	0	7	22nd
2016	ADAC GT Masters	GRT Grasser Racing Team	12	0	1	1	0	34	21st
2016	Blancpain GT Series Endurance Cup	GRT Grasser Racing Team	5	0	1	0	0	15	27th
2016	Nürburgring Endurance Series - SP9	Konrad Motorsport	1	0	0	0	0	?	?
2016	24 Hours of Nürburgring - SP9	Konrad Motorsport	1	0	0	0	0	N/A	DNF
2017	ADAC GT Masters	Team Zakspeed	14	0	2	2	3	87	11th
2017	Intercontinental GT Challenge	Black Falcon	1	0	0	0	0	4	14th
2017	Blancpain GT Series Endurance Cup	Black Falcon	5	0	1	0	0	19	19th
2017	Nürburgring Endurance Series - SP9	Black Falcon	2	0	0	0	0	?	?
2017	24 Hours of Nürburgring - SP9	Black Falcon	1	0	0	0	0	N/A	13th
2017	24H Series - A6	Konrad Motorsport	1	0	0	0	1	14	?
2017	24H Series - A6	Black Falcon	1	0	0	0	1	14	?
2017	IMSA SportsCar Championship - GTD	Konrad Motorsport	1	0	0	0	0	11	79th
2018	Blancpain GT Series Endurance Cup	Black Falcon	5	1	1	0	2	73	**1st**
2018	Blancpain GT Series Sprint Cup	Black Falcon	4	0	1	0	1	14	14th
2018	Nürburgring Endurance Series - SP9	Black Falcon	2	0	0	0	1	?	?
2018	24H GT Series - A6-Pro	Black Falcon	2	0	0	0	0	?	?
2018	ADAC GT Masters	Team Zakspeed	14	0	0	0	0	42	15th
2018	IMSA SportsCar Championship - GTD	Riley Motorsports	4	0	0	0	1	107	19th
2018	Intercontinental GT Challenge	Black Swan Racing	1	0	0	0	1	18	13th
2018	Intercontinental GT Challenge	Mercedes-AMG Team Black Falcon	1	0	0	0	1	18	13th
2018	Intercontinental GT Challenge	SunEnergy1 Racing	2	0	0	0	0	18	13th
2018	24 Hours of Le Mans - GTE Am	Keating Motorsports	1	0	0	0	1	N/A	**3rd**
2018	24 Hours of Nürburgring - SP9	Mercedes-AMG Team Black Falcon	1	0	0	0	1	N/A	**3rd**
2019	Blancpain GT Series Sprint Cup	Black Falcon	10	1	1	2	5	92.5	**2nd**
2019	Blancpain GT Series Endurance Cup	Black Falcon	5	0	1	0	2	51	**3rd**
2019	Nürburgring Endurance Series - SP9	Black Falcon	2	0	0	0	1	?	?
2019	Nürburgring Endurance Series - SPX	Black Falcon	1	1	0	0	1	?	?
2019	IMSA SportsCar Championship - GTD	Riley Motorsports	1	0	0	0	0	25	50th
2019	ADAC GT Masters	Toksport WRT	4	0	0	0	2	0	NC
2019	24H GT Series - A6	Abu Dhabi Racing Black Falcon	1	0	0	0	0	?	?
2019	24H GT Series - A6	Toksport WRT	2	0	0	0	1	?	?
2019	Intercontinental GT Challenge	Mercedes-AMG Team Craft-Bamboo Racing	2	0	0	0	0	48	9th
2019	Intercontinental GT Challenge	Mercedes-AMG Team GruppeM Racing	1	0	0	0	0	48	9th
2019	Intercontinental GT Challenge	Mercedes-AMG Team Black Falcon	1	0	1	0	1	48	9th
2019	Intercontinental GT Challenge	Mercedes-AMG Team SPS Automotive Performance	1	0	0	0	0	48	9th
2019	24 Hours of Nürburgring - SP9	Mercedes-AMG Team Black Falcon	1	0	0	0	1	N/A	**2nd**
2020	ADAC GT Masters	Toksport WRT	14	1	1	0	6	167	**3rd**
2020	24H GT Series - GT3-Pro	Toksport WRT	1	0	0	0	0	?	?
2020	GT World Challenge Europe Sprint Cup	Haupt Racing Team	8	1	2	1	4	60	6th
2020	GT World Challenge Europe Endurance Cup	Haupt Racing Team	4	0	0	0	1	40	7th
2020	Nürburgring Endurance Series - SP9	Haupt Racing Team	3	2	1	0	2	?	?
2020	Intercontinental GT Challenge	Mercedes-AMG Team Craft-Bamboo Black Falcon	1	0	0	0	0	20	11th
2020	Intercontinental GT Challenge	Mercedes-AMG Team HRT	1	0	0	0	0	20	11th
2020	24 Hours of Nürburgring - SP9	Mercedes-AMG Team HRT	1	0	0	0	0	N/A	DNF
2021	GT World Challenge Europe Sprint Cup	Toksport WRT	10	4	2	2	6	95	**2nd**
2021	ADAC GT Masters	Toksport WRT	14	0	0	0	6	176	**3rd**
2021	Deutsche Tourenwagen Masters	Mercedes-AMG Team Toksport WRT	2	0	0	0	0	0	NC†
2021	IMSA SportsCar Championship - GTD	SunEnergy1 Racing	2	0	0	0	1	341	44th
2021	GT World Challenge Europe Endurance Cup	Haupt Racing Team	5	0	0	0	1	25	12th
2021	Nürburgring Endurance Series - SP9	Haupt Racing Team	?	?	?	?	?	?	?
2021	Intercontinental GT Challenge	Mercedes-AMG Team HRT	1	0	0	0	0	0	NC
2021	Intercontinental GT Challenge	Mercedes-AMG Team Craft-Bamboo Racing	1	0	0	0	0	0	NC
2021	24 Hours of Nürburgring - SP9	Mercedes-AMG Team HRT Bilstein	1	0	0	0	0	N/A	DNF
2022	Deutsche Tourenwagen Masters	Mercedes-AMG Team HRT	16	1	0	2	4	108	6th
2022	ADAC GT Masters	Mercedes-AMG Team zvo	2	0	0	0	0	7	33rd
2022	GT World Challenge Europe Endurance Cup	BWT Team GetSpeed Performance	5	0	0	0	2	53	5th
2022	IMSA SportsCar Championship - GTD	SunEnergy1 Racing	1	0	0	0	0	128	70th
2022	Intercontinental GT Challenge	SunEnergy1 Racing by Triple Eight	1	1	0	0	1	55	4th
2022	Intercontinental GT Challenge	Mercedes-AMG Team GetSpeed	1	0	0	0	1	55	4th
2022	Intercontinental GT Challenge	Al Manar Racing by GetSpeed	1	0	0	0	0	55	4th
2022	24H GT Series - GT3	Al Manar Racing by HRT							
2022	FIA Motorsport Games GT Sprint	Team Germany	1	0	0	0	0	N/A	4th
2022	24 Hours of Nürburgring - SP9	Mercedes-AMG Team Bilstein by HRT	1	0	0	0	0	N/A	7th
2022-23	Middle East Trophy - GT3	Al Manar Racing by HRT							
2023	Deutsche Tourenwagen Masters	Mercedes-AMG Team HRT	16	1	1	1	4	133	6th
2023	GT World Challenge Europe Endurance Cup	Mercedes-AMG Team Al Manar	5	0	0	0	2	57	4th
2023	GT World Challenge Asia - GT3	Triple Eight JMR	8	2	1	1	4	95	5th
2023	GT World Challenge Asia - Pro-Am Cup	Triple Eight JMR	8	1	1	1	4	96	5th
2023	Asian Le Mans Series - GT	Haupt Racing Team	4	2	0	1	3	71	**2nd**
2023	IMSA SportsCar Championship - GTD	SunEnergy1	1	0	1	0	0	125	68th
2023	Intercontinental GT Challenge	SunEnergy1 Racing	1	1	0	0	1	83	**2nd**
2023	Intercontinental GT Challenge	SPS automotive performance	1	0	0	0	0	83	**2nd**
2023	Intercontinental GT Challenge	Mercedes-AMG Team Al Manar	1	0	0	0	0	83	**2nd**
2023	Intercontinental GT Challenge	Mercedes-AMG Team GruppeM Racing	2	1	1	1	2	83	**2nd**
2023	24 Hours of Nürburgring - SP9	Mercedes-AMG Team Bilstein by HRT	1	0	1	0	1	N/A	**3rd**
2023-24	Asian Le Mans Series - GT	Triple Eight JMR	5	2	0	0	2	74	**2nd**
2023-24	Middle East Trophy - GT3	GetSpeed Performance							
2024	Deutsche Tourenwagen Masters	Mercedes-AMG Team HRT	14	1	0	1	2	127	9th
2024	GT World Challenge Europe Endurance Cup	Mercedes-AMG Team GetSpeed	5	0	0	0	1	24	13th
2024	IMSA SportsCar Championship - GTD Pro	SunEnergy1 Racing	1	0	0	0	0	201	45th
2024	Intercontinental GT Challenge	SunEnergy1	1	0	0	0	1	34	6th
2024	Intercontinental GT Challenge	Mercedes-AMG Team Bilstein by HRT	1	0	0	0	0	34	6th
2024	Intercontinental GT Challenge	Mercedes-AMG Team GetSpeed	1	0	0	0	0	34	6th
2024	Intercontinental GT Challenge	Mercedes-AMG Team Lone Star Racing	1	0	0	0	0	34	6th
2024	Nürburgring Langstrecken-Serie - SP9	Mercedes-AMG Team Bilstein by HRT							
2024	24 Hours of Nürburgring - SP9	Mercedes-AMG Team Bilstein by HRT	1	0	0	0	0	N/A	4th
2024	GT World Challenge Asia	Triple Eight JMR	6	0	3	?	1	46	11th
2024	GT World Challenge America - Pro	Mercedes-AMG Team Lone Star Racing	1	0	0	0	0	0	NC†
2024-25	Asian Le Mans Series - GT	Winward Racing	4	0	0	0	2	30	11th
2025	IMSA SportsCar Championship - GTD Pro	GetSpeed	1	0	0	0	0	280	29th
2025	Intercontinental GT Challenge	75 Express	1	0	0	0	1	41	7th
2025	Intercontinental GT Challenge	Mercedes-AMG Team GetSpeed	2	0	0	0	0	41	7th
2025	Intercontinental GT Challenge	Mercedes-AMG Team GMR	2	0	0	0	1	41	7th
2025	Nürburgring Langstrecken-Serie - SP9	Mercedes-AMG Team Bilstein by GetSpeed							
2025	GT World Challenge Europe Endurance Cup	Mercedes-AMG Team GetSpeed	5	0	1	1	0	15	14th
2025	24 Hours of Nürburgring - SP9	Mercedes-AMG Team GetSpeed	1	0	0	0	0	N/A	DNF
2025	GT World Challenge Europe Sprint Cup	Boutsen VDS	10	0	0	0	0	17.5	10th
2025	24 Hours of Le Mans - LMGT3	Iron Lynx	1	0	0	0	0	N/A	15th
2025	International GT Open	GetSpeed	2	0	0	0	0	5	29th
2025-26	24H Series Middle East - GT3	Winward Racing							
2026	IMSA SportsCar Championship - GTD Pro	Winward Racing	2	0	0	0	1	512	29th
2026	Intercontinental GT Challenge	75 Express	1	0	0	0	0	61	3rd
2026	Intercontinental GT Challenge	Mercedes-AMG Team Ravenol	1	1	0	0	1	61	3rd
2026	Intercontinental GT Challenge	Mercedes-AMG Team GetSpeed	1	0	0	0	1	61	3rd
2026	Intercontinental GT Challenge	Mercedes-AMG Team Craft-Bamboo Racing	1	0	0	0	0	61	3rd
2026	Intercontinental GT Challenge	Mercedes-AMG Team Lone Star Racing	1	0	0	0	0	61	3rd
2026	Nürburgring Langstrecken-Serie - SP9	Mercedes-AMG Team Ravenol							
2026	24 Hours of Nürburgring - SP9	Mercedes-AMG Team Ravenol	1	1	0	0	1	N/A	**1st**
2026	GT World Challenge Europe Endurance Cup	Mercedes-AMG Team Mann-Filter	5	0	1	0	3	86	**1st**
2026	IMSA SportsCar Championship - GTD	Lone Star Racing	1	0	0	0	0	308	59th
2026	GT World Challenge America - Pro	Mercedes-AMG Team Lone Star Racing	1	0	0	0	0	0	NC†
2026-27	Asian Le Mans Series - GT3	Craft-Bamboo Iron Lynx							

^{*} Season still in progress.

=== Complete ADAC Formel Masters results ===
(key) (Races in bold indicate pole position) (Races in italics indicate fastest lap)

Year	Team	1	2	3	4	5	6	7	8	9	10	11	12	13	14	15	16	17	18	19	20	21	22	23	24	DC	Points
2011	URD Rennsport	OSC; 1; 9	OSC; 2; 11	OSC; 3; 10	SAC; 1; 19	SAC; 2; 12	SAC; 3; 11	ZOL; 1; 13	ZOL; 2; 7	ZOL; 3; 7	NÜR; 1; 12	NÜR; 2; 9	NÜR; 3; 11	RBR; 1; 9	RBR; 2; 7	RBR; 3; 6	LAU; 1; 6	LAU; 2; 9	LAU; 3; 5	ASS; 1; 14	ASS; 2 Ret	ASS; 3; 11	HOC; 1; 4	HOC; 2; 7	HOC; 3; 10	12th	72

=== Complete German Formula Three Championship results ===
(key) (Races in bold indicate pole position) (Races in italics indicate fastest lap)

Year	Entrant	1	2	3	4	5	6	7	8	9	10	11	12	13	14	15	16	17	18	19	20	21	22	23	24	25	26	27	DC	Points
2012	Performance Racing	ZAN; 1	ZAN; 2	ZAN; 3	SAC; 1	SAC; 2	SAC; 3	OSC; 1	OSC; 2	OSC; 2	SPA; 1	SPA; 2	SPA; 3	ASS; 1; 8	ASS; 2; 2	ASS; 3; 5	RBR; 1; 4	RBR; 2 Ret	RBR; 3; 8	LAU; 1; 3	LAU; 2; 10	LAU; 3; 4	NÜR; 1; 7	NÜR; 2; 3	NÜR; 3; 9	HOC; 1; 12	HOC; 2; 7	HOC; 3; 8	10th	85

=== Complete Porsche Carrera Cup Germany results ===
(key) (Races in bold indicate pole position) (Races in italics indicate fastest lap)

Year	Team	1	2	3	4	5	6	7	8	9	10	11	12	13	14	15	16	17	DC	Points
2013	Land — Motorsport	HOC; 1; 14	HOC; 2 Ret	NNS	RBR; 1; 8	RBR; 2 Ret	LAU; 1; 21	LAU; 2; 18	NOR; 1; 14	NOR; 2 DNS	NÜR; 1; 16	NÜR; 2; 17	OSC; 1 Ret	OSC; 2; 17	ZAN; 1; 10	ZAN; 2 Ret	HOC; 1; 13	HOC; 2; 30†	20th	25

=== Complete ADAC GT Masters results ===
(key) (Races in bold indicate pole position) (Races in italics indicate fastest lap)

Year	Team	Car	1	2	3	4	5	6	7	8	9	10	11	12	13	14	15	16	DC	Points
2014	HTP Motorsport	Mercedes-Benz SLS AMG GT3	OSC; 1; 21	OSC; 2; 7	ZAN; 1; 14	ZAN; 2 Ret	LAU; 1 Ret	LAU; 2; 14	RBR; 1; 22	RBR; 2; 12	SLO; 1; 19	SLO; 2; 9	NÜR; 1; 10	NÜR; 2; 9	SAC; 1; 7	SAC; 2; 11	HOC; 1; 8	HOC; 2; 3	24th	36
2015	Bentley Team HTP	Bentley Continental GT3	**OSC**; **1**; 11	**OSC**; **2**; 1	RBR; 1; 13	RBR; 2; 5	SPA; 1; 3	SPA; 2; 15	LAU; 1; 6	LAU; 2; 7	NÜR; 1; 13	NÜR; 2; 7	SAC; 1 Ret	SAC; 2; 4	ZAN; 1; 4	ZAN; 2; 9	**HOC**; **1** Ret	HOC; 2; 11	9th	101
2016	GRT Grasser Racing Team	Lamborghini Huracán GT3	OSC; 1; 29	OSC; 2; 13	**SAC**; **1**; 7	SAC; 2; 5	LAU; 1; 5	LAU; 2; 7	RBR; 1; 10	RBR; 2; 10	NÜR; 1 Ret	NÜR; 2; 25	ZAN; 1; 11	ZAN; 2; 14	HOC; 1	HOC; 2			21st	34
2017	Mercedes-AMG Team Zakspeed	Mercedes-AMG GT3	OSC; 1; 8	OSC; 2; 8	**LAU**; **1**; 2	LAU; 2; 17	RBR; 1; 5	RBR; 2; 6	ZAN; 1; 5	ZAN; 2; 10	**NÜR**; **1**; 3	NÜR; 2; 11	SAC; 1 DSQ	SAC; 2 DSQ	HOC; 1; 3	HOC; 2; 9			11th	87
2018	Team Zakspeed BKK Mobil Oil Racing	Mercedes-AMG GT3	OSC; 1; 4	OSC; 2; 17	MST; 1; 7	MST; 2 Ret	RBR; 1; 13	RBR; 2; 5	NÜR; 1; 4	NÜR; 2; 9	ZAN; 1; 14	ZAN; 2 Ret	SAC; 1; 18	SAC; 2; 26	HOC; 1; 27	HOC; 2; 16			15th	42
2019	Toksport WRT	Mercedes-AMG GT3	OSC; 1	OSC; 2	MST; 1	MST; 2	RBR; 1	RBR; 2	ZAN; 1 Ret	ZAN; 2; 5	NÜR; 1; 2	NÜR; 2; 3	HOC; 1	HOC; 2	SAC; 1	SAC; 2			NC†	0†
2020	Toksport WRT	Mercedes-AMG GT3 Evo	**LAU**; **1**; 1	LAU; 2; 2	NÜR; 1; 2	NÜR; 2; 7	HOC; 1; 18	HOC; 2; 9	SAC; 1; 3	SAC; 2 Ret	RBR; 1; 10	RBR; 2; 2	LAU; 1 Ret	LAU; 2; 4	OSC; 1; 2	OSC; 2; 5			**3rd**	**167**
2021	BWT Toksport WRT	Mercedes-AMG GT3 Evo	OSC; 1; 5	OSC; 2; 7	RBR; 1; 10	RBR; 2 Ret	ZAN; 1; 2	ZAN; 2; 6	LAU; 1; 2	LAU; 2; 2	SAC; 1; 2	SAC; 2; 2	HOC; 1; 4	HOC; 2; 3	NÜR; 1; 4	NÜR; 2 Ret			**3rd**	**176**

=== Complete GT World Challenge Europe results ===
==== GT World Challenge Europe Sprint Cup ====
(key) (Races in bold indicate pole position) (Races in italics indicate fastest lap)

Year	Team	Car	Class	1	2	3	4	5	6	7	8	9	10	11	12	13	14	Pos.	Points
2014	HTP Motorsport	Mercedes-Benz SLS AMG GT3	Silver	NOG; QR	NOG; CR	BRH; QR	BRH; CR	ZAN; QR	ZAN; CR	SLO; QR; 17	SLO; CR; 5	**POR**; **QR**; 8	POR; CR; 17	ZOL; QR; 19	ZOL; CR; 12	BAK; QR; 19	BAK; CR; DNS	4th	79
2016	GRT Grasser Racing Team	Lamborghini Huracán GT3	Silver	MIS; QR; 16	MIS; MR; 23	**BRH**; **QR**; 23	BRH; MR; 10	**NÜR**; **QR**; 15	NÜR; MR; 13	HUN; QR; 26	HUN; MR; 20	CAT; QR; 12	CAT; MR; 7					1st	125
2018	Black Falcon	Mercedes-AMG GT3	Silver	ZOL; 1	ZOL; 2	BRH; 1	BRH; 2	MIS; 1	MIS; 2	HUN; 1; 9	**HUN**; **2**; 12	NÜR; 1; 15	**NÜR**; **2**; 2					7th	43
2019	Black Falcon	Mercedes-AMG GT3	Pro	**BRH**; **1**; 2	BRH; 2; 1	MIS; 1; 3	MIS; 2; 4	ZAN; 1; 4	ZAN; 2; 4	NÜR; 1; 8	NÜR; 2; 4	HUN; 1; 2	HUN; 2; 3					2nd	92.5
2020	Haupt Racing Team	Mercedes-AMG GT3 Evo	Pro	MIS; 1; 4	MIS; 2; 2	MIS; 3; 4	**MAG**; **1**; 1	MAG; 2; 3	ZAN; 1	ZAN; 2	CAT; 1; 5	CAT; 2; 17	CAT; 3 Ret					6th	60
2021	Toksport WRT	Mercedes-AMG GT3 Evo	Pro	MAG; 1; 25	**MAG**; **2**; 1	ZAN; 1; 7	ZAN; 2 Ret	MIS; 1; 2	MIS; 2; 24	BRH; 1; 2	BRH; 2; 1	VAL; 1; 1	**VAL**; **2**; 1					2nd	95
2025	Boutsen VDS	Mercedes-AMG GT3 Evo	Pro	BRH; 1; 21	BRH; 2; 20	ZAN; 1; 8	ZAN; 2; 10	MIS; 1; 18	MIS; 2; 6	MAG; 1; 5	MAG; 2; 6	VAL; 1; 30	VAL; 2; 13					10th	17.5

==== GT World Challenge Europe Endurance Cup ====
(key) (Races in bold indicate pole position) (Races in italics indicate fastest lap)

Year	Team	Car	Class	1	2	3	4	5	6	7	Pos.	Points
2016	GRT Grasser Racing Team	Lamborghini Huracán GT3	Pro	MNZ; 40	SIL; 21	LEC; 40	SPA; 6H; 4	SPA; 12H; 24	SPA; 24H; 15	**NÜR**; 6	27th	15
2017	Mercedes-AMG Team Black Falcon	Mercedes-AMG GT3	Pro	MNZ; 10	SIL; Ret	**LEC**; 33	SPA; 6H; 13	SPA; 12H; 7	SPA; 24H; 8	CAT; 5	19th	19
2018	Mercedes-AMG Team Black Falcon	Mercedes-AMG GT3	Pro	MNZ; 3	SIL; 6	LEC; Ret	SPA; 6H; 5	SPA; 12H; 2	SPA; 24H; 5	**CAT**; 1	1st	73
2019	Black Falcon	Mercedes-AMG GT3	Pro	MNZ; 3	SIL; 7	LEC; 15	**SPA**; **6H**; 3	SPA; 12H; 3	SPA; 24H; 3	CAT; 12	3rd	51
2020	Haupt Racing Team	Mercedes-AMG GT3 Evo	Pro	IMO; 15	NÜR; 3	SPA; 6H; 12	SPA; 12H; 4	SPA; 24H; 7	LEC; 6		7th	40
2021	BWT Haupt Racing Team	Mercedes-AMG GT3 Evo	Pro	MNZ; 13	LEC; 38	SPA; 6H; 16	SPA; 12H; 15	SPA; 24H; 36	NÜR; 3	CAT; 5	12th	25
2022	BWT Team GetSpeed Performance	Mercedes-AMG GT3 Evo	Pro	IMO; 3	LEC; Ret	SPA; 6H; 7	SPA; 12H; 10	SPA; 24H; 2	HOC; 4	CAT; 8	5th	53
2023	Mercedes-AMG Team Al Manar	Mercedes-AMG GT3 Evo	Pro	MNZ; Ret	LEC; 2	SPA; 6H; 9	SPA; 12H; 15	SPA; 24H; 9	NÜR; 2	CAT; 4	4th	57
2024	Mercedes-AMG Team GetSpeed	Mercedes-AMG GT3 Evo	Pro	LEC; 3	SPA; 6H; 24	SPA; 12H; 5	SPA; 24H; Ret	NÜR; 12	MNZ; Ret	JED; 8	13th	24
2025	Mercedes-AMG Team GetSpeed	Mercedes-AMG GT3 Evo	Pro	LEC; 13	**MNZ**; 48†	SPA; 6H; 1	SPA; 12H; 60†	SPA; 24H; Ret	NÜR; 22	CAT; 14	14th	15
2026	Mercedes-AMG Team Mann-Filter	Mercedes-AMG GT3 Evo	Pro	**LEC**; 2	MNZ; 2	SPA; 6H; 3	SPA; 12H; 4	SPA; 24H; 2	NÜR; 4	ALG; 14	1st	86

=== 24 Hours of Nürburgring results ===
Year	Team	Co-drivers	Car	Class	Laps	Pos.	Class pos.
2016	(Austria) Konrad Motorsport	(Germany) Dominik Farnbacher (Austria) Franz Konrad (Austria) Christopher Zöchling	Lamborghini Huracán GT3	SP9	111	DNF	DNF
2017	(Germany) Black Falcon	(Saudi Arabia) Abdulaziz bin Turki Al-Faisal (Germany) Hubert Haupt (Spain) Daniel Juncadella	Mercedes-AMG GT3	SP9	156	13th	13th
2018	(Germany) Mercedes-AMG Team Black Falcon	(Netherlands) Yelmer Buurman (Germany) Thomas Jäger (Germany) Jan Seyffarth	Mercedes-AMG GT3	SP9	135	**3rd**	**3rd**
2019	(Germany) Mercedes-AMG Team Black Falcon	(Germany) Maximilian Buhk (Germany) Hubert Haupt (Germany) Thomas Jäger	Mercedes-AMG GT3	SP9	156	**2nd**	**2nd**
2020	(Germany) Mercedes-AMG Team HRT	(United Kingdom) Adam Christodoulou (Germany) Maro Engel (Germany) Manuel Metzger	Mercedes-AMG GT3 Evo	SP9	28	DNF	DNF
2021	(Germany) Mercedes-AMG Team HRT Bilstein	(United Kingdom) Adam Christodoulou (Germany) Maro Engel (Germany) Manuel Metzger	Mercedes-AMG GT3 Evo	SP9	37	DNF	DNF
2022	(Germany) Mercedes-AMG Team Bilstein by HRT	(Switzerland) Philip Ellis (Switzerland) Raffaele Marciello	Mercedes-AMG GT3 Evo	SP9; Pro	158	7th	7th
2022	(Germany) Mercedes-AMG Team Bilstein by HRT	(Switzerland) Philip Ellis (Switzerland) Raffaele Marciello (Switzerland) Edoardo Mortara	Mercedes-AMG GT3 Evo	SP9; Pro	162	**3rd**	**3rd**
2024	(Germany) Mercedes-AMG Team Bilstein by HRT	(Germany) Maximilian Götz (Spain) Daniel Juncadella (India) Arjun Maini	Mercedes-AMG GT3 Evo	SP9; Pro	50	4th	4th
2025	(Germany) Mercedes-AMG Team GetSpeed	(Germany) Maro Engel (Belgium) Maxime Martin (Germany) Fabian Schiller	Mercedes-AMG GT3 Evo	SP9; Pro	41	DNF	DNF
2026	(United States) Mercedes-AMG Team Ravenol	(Germany) Maro Engel (Belgium) Maxime Martin (Germany) Fabian Schiller	Mercedes-AMG GT3 Evo	SP9; Pro	156	**1st**	**1st**

=== Complete IMSA SportsCar Championship results ===
(key) (Races in bold indicate pole position; results in italics indicate fastest lap)

Year	Team	Class	Make	Engine	1	2	3	4	5	6	7	8	9	10	11	12	Pos.	Points
2017	Konrad Motorsport	GTD	Lamborghini Huracán GT3	Lamborghini DGF 5.2 L V10	DAY; 20	SEB	LBH	AUS	BEL	WGL	MOS	LIM	ELK	VIR	LGA	PET	79th	11
2018	Mercedes-AMG Team Riley Motorsports	GTD	Mercedes-AMG GT3	Mercedes-AMG M159 6.2 V8	DAY; 4	SEB; 3	MOH	BEL	WGL; 5	MOS	LIM	ELK	VIR	LGA	PET; 8		19th	107
2019	Mercedes-AMG Team Riley Motorsports	GTD	Mercedes-AMG GT3	Mercedes-AMG M159 6.2 L V8	DAY; 6	SEB	MDO	DET	WGL	MOS	LIM	ELK	VIR	LGA	PET		50th	25
2021	SunEnergy1 Racing	GTD	Mercedes-AMG GT3 Evo	Mercedes-AMG M159 6.2 L V8	DAY; 2	SEB	MDO	DET	WGL	WGL	LIM	ELK	LGA	LBH	VIR	PET	44th	341
2022	SunEnergy1	GTD	Mercedes-AMG GT3 Evo	Mercedes-AMG M159 6.2 L V8	DAY; 21	SEB	LBH	LGA	MDO	DET	WGL	MOS	LIM	ELK	VIR	PET	70th	128
2023	SunEnergy1	GTD	Mercedes-AMG GT3 Evo	Mercedes-AMG M159 6.2 L V8	**DAY**; 22	SEB	LBH	MON	WGL	MOS	LIM	ELK	VIR	IMS	PET		68th	125
2024	SunEnergy1 Racing	GTD Pro	Mercedes-AMG GT3 Evo	Mercedes-AMG M159 6.2 L V8	DAY; 13	SEB	LGA	DET	WGL	MOS	ELK	VIR	IMS	PET			45th	201
2025	GetSpeed	GTD Pro	Mercedes-AMG GT3 Evo	Mercedes-AMG M159 6.2 L V8	DAY; 5	SEB	LGA	DET	WGL	MOS	ELK	VIR	IMS	PET			29th	280
2026	Winward Racing	GTD Pro	Mercedes-AMG GT3 Evo	Mercedes-AMG M159 6.2 L V8	DAY; 3	SEB; 12		LGA	DET	WGL	MOS	ELK	VIR	IMS			29th	512
2026	Lone Star Racing	GTD	Mercedes-AMG GT3 Evo	Mercedes-AMG M159 6.2 L V8			LBH								PET; 4		59th	308

=== 24 Hours of Le Mans results ===
Year	Team	Co-Drivers	Car	Class	Laps	Pos.	Class Pos.
2018	(United States) Keating Motorsport	(Netherlands) Jeroen Bleekemolen (United States) Ben Keating	Ferrari 488 GTE	GTE; Am	334	28th	**3rd**
2025	(Italy) Iron Lynx	(Australia) Brenton Grove (Australia) Stephen Grove	Mercedes-AMG GT3 Evo	LMGT3	334	47th	15th

=== Bathurst 12 Hour results ===
Year	Team	Co-drivers	Car	Class	Laps	Ovr. Pos.	Cla. Pos.
2018	(United States) Black Swan Racing	(Netherlands) Jeroen Bleekemolen (Germany) Marc Lieb (United States) Tim Pappas	Porsche 911 GT3 R (991)	Pro-Am	271	**3rd**	**1st**
2019	(Hong Kong) Craft-Bamboo Racing / (Saudi Arabia) Black Falcon	(Germany) Maro Engel (United Kingdom) Gary Paffett	Mercedes-AMG GT3	Pro	185	DNF	DNF
2020	(Hong Kong) Craft-Bamboo Racing	(Netherlands) Yelmer Buurman (Germany) Maro Engel	Mercedes-AMG GT3 Evo	Pro	314	5th	5th
2022	(United States) SunEnergy1 Racing / (Australia) Triple Eight Race Engineering	(France) Jules Gounon (Australia) Kenny Habul (Austria) Martin Konrad	Mercedes-AMG GT3 Evo	Pro-Am	291	**1st**	**1st**
2023	(United States) SunEnergy1 Racing / (France) AKKodis ASP Team	(France) Jules Gounon (Australia) Kenny Habul	Mercedes-AMG GT3 Evo	Pro	323	**1st**	**1st**
2024	(United States) SunEnergy1 Racing	(France) Jules Gounon (Australia) Kenny Habul	Mercedes-AMG GT3 Evo	Pro	275	**2nd**	**2nd**
2025	(Australia) 75 Express	(Andorra) Jules Gounon (Australia) Kenny Habul	Mercedes-AMG GT3 Evo	Pro	306	**3rd**	**3rd**
2026	(Australia) 75 Express	(Andorra) Jules Gounon (Australia) Kenny Habul	Mercedes-AMG GT3 Evo	Pro	262	7th	5th

=== Complete Deutsche Tourenwagen Masters results ===
(key) (Races in bold indicate pole position; races in italics indicate fastest lap)

Year	Entrant	Chassis	1	2	3	4	5	6	7	8	9	10	11	12	13	14	15	16	Rank	Points
2021	Mercedes-AMG Team Toksport WRT	Mercedes-AMG GT3 Evo	MNZ; 1	MNZ; 2	LAU; 1	LAU; 2	ZOL; 1	ZOL; 2	NÜR; 1; 9	NÜR; 2 Ret	RBR; 1	RBR; 2	ASS; 1	ASS; 2	HOC; 1	HOC; 2	NOR; 1	NOR; 2	NC†	0†
2022	Mercedes-AMG Team HRT	Mercedes-AMG GT3 Evo	ALG; 1; 2	ALG; 2 Ret	LAU; 1; 2	LAU; 2; 12	IMO; 1; 11	IMO; 2; 12	NOR; 1; 7	NOR; 2; 8	NÜR; 1; 17	NÜR; 2; 1	SPA; 1; 15	SPA; 2; 5	RBR; 1; 10	RBR; 2; 2	HOC; 1; 9^{2}	HOC; 2; 9	6th	108
2023	Mercedes-AMG Team HRT	Mercedes-AMG GT3 Evo	OSC; 1 Ret	OSC; 2 Ret	ZAN; 1; 11	ZAN; 2; 3	NOR; 1 Ret	NOR; 2; 10	NÜR; 1; 15	NÜR; 2; 13	LAU; 1; 6	LAU; 2; 3	**SAC**; **1**; 1^{1}	SAC; 2; 2^{3}	RBR; 1; 7	RBR; 2 Ret	HOC; 1; 8	HOC; 2; 7^{3}	6th	133
2024	Mercedes-AMG Team HRT	Mercedes-AMG GT3 Evo	OSC; 1; 5	OSC; 2; 3^{2}	LAU; 1; 10	LAU; 2 Ret	ZAN; 1; 10	ZAN; 2; 5	NOR; 1; 11	NOR; 2; 7	NÜR; 1; 12	NÜR; 2; 11	SAC; 1; 4	SAC; 2; 1^{3}	RBR; 1; 4	RBR; 2 Ret	HOC; 1	HOC; 2	9th	127

^{†} As Stolz was a guest driver, he was ineligible to score points.

=== Complete Asian Le Mans Series results ===
(key) (Races in bold indicate pole position) (Races in italics indicate fastest lap)

Year	Team	Class	Car	Engine	1	2	3	4	5	6	Pos.	Points
2023	Haupt Racing Team	GT	Mercedes-AMG GT3 Evo	Mercedes-AMG M159 6.2 L V8	DUB; 1; 3	DUB; 2; 7	ABU; 1; 1	ABU; 2; 1			2nd	71
2023–24	Triple Eight JMR	GT	Mercedes-AMG GT3 Evo	Mercedes-AMG M159 6.2 L V8	SEP; 1; 7	SEP; 2; 6	DUB; 5	ABU; 1; 1	ABU; 2; 1		2nd	74
2024–25	Winward Racing	GT	Mercedes-AMG GT3 Evo	Mercedes-AMG M159 6.2 L V8	SEP; 1	SEP; 2	DUB; 1 Ret	DUB; 2; 2	**ABU**; **1** Ret	ABU; 2; 10	11th	30
2026–27	Craft-Bamboo Iron Lynx	GT	Mercedes-AMG GT3 Evo	Mercedes-AMG M159 6.2 L V8	LEC; 1; 2	LEC; 2; 15	JER; 1	JER; 2	ALG; 1	ALG; 2	4th*	18*

Sporting positions
Preceded by Jules Szymkowiak	GT World Challenge Europe Sprint Cup; Silver Cup Champion; 2016; With: Michele Beretta	Succeeded by Fabian Schiller; Jules Szymkowiak
Preceded by Mirko Bortolotti; Andrea Caldarelli; Christian Engelhart	GT World Challenge Europe Endurance Cup; Champion; 2018; With: Yelmer Buurman & Maro Engel	Succeeded by Andrea Caldarelli; Marco Mapelli
