= Pinder =

Pinder may refer to:

- Pinder (surname), people with the surname Pinder
- Pinder, New Brunswick, Canada
- Pinder Gully, gulley in Signey Island
- the keeper of a pinfold, i.e. of an animal pound
- Pinder's Drugs, a defunct Western Canadian pharmaceutical chain
