= René Binder =

Austrian racing driver (born 1992)

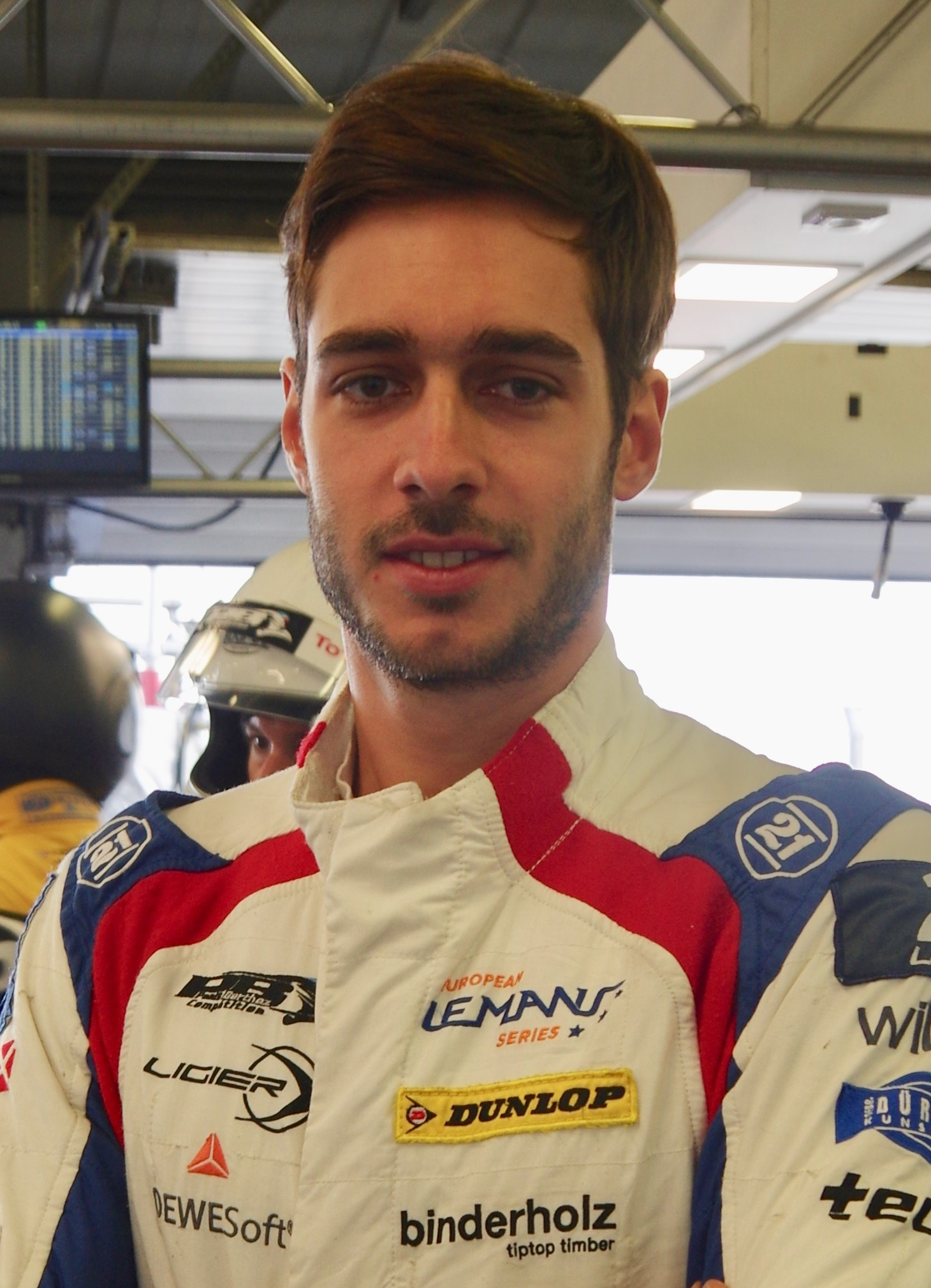
- Binder in 2019
- Nationality: (Austria) Austrian
- Born: 1 January 1992 (age 34) Innsbruck, Austria
- Relatives: Franz Binder (father); Hans Binder (uncle)

European Le Mans Series career
- Debut season: 2019
- Current team: Proton Competition
- Categorisation: FIA Silver (until 2022); FIA Gold (2023–)
- Former teams: Panis Barthez Competition, Inter Europol Competition, Algarve Pro Racing
- Starts: 35 (35 entries)
- Championships: 0
- Wins: 2
- Podiums: 3
- Poles: 9
- Fastest laps: 0
- Best finish: 3rd in 2024

Previous series
- 2018–19, 2022 2018 2017 2016–17 2012–16 2015 2010–12 2011 2009: World Endurance Championship; IndyCar Series; FIA Formula 2 Championship; Formula V8 3.5 Series; GP2 Series; Formula Renault 3.5 Series; ATS Formel 3 Cup; FIA Formula Two Championship; ADAC Formel Masters

Championship titles
- 2021: Asian Le Mans - LMP2

René Binder (born 1 January 1992) is an Austrian racing driver who currently competes in the European Le Mans Series with Proton Competition. He is the nephew of former Formula One driver Hans Binder, and his father, Franz, was also a racing driver.

== Early career ==
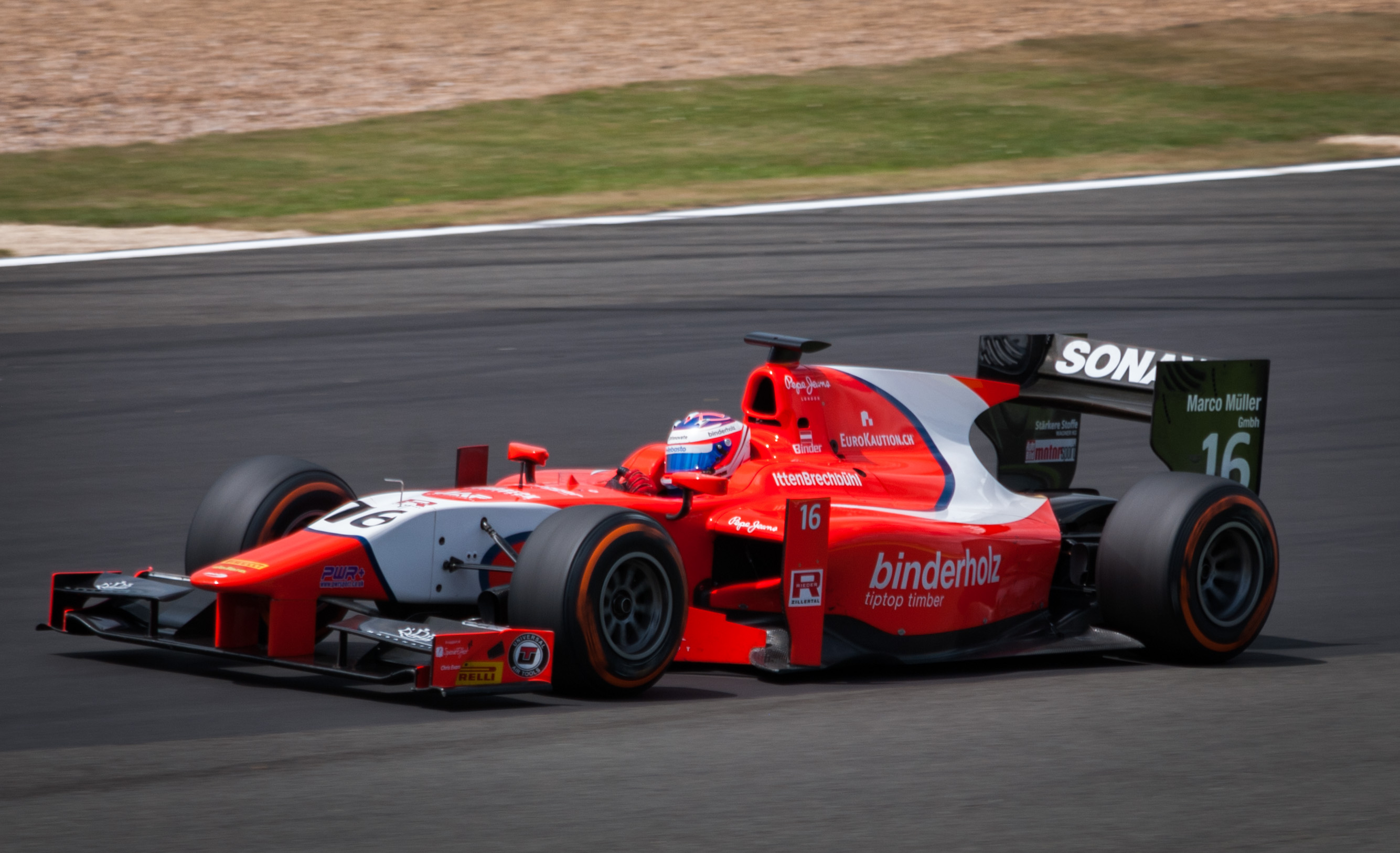
Binder competing at Silverstone during the 2014 GP2 Series.

Binder was born in Innsbruck. He began his racing career in karting in 2002, remaining in the category until 2008. During this time, he finished third in the German Junior Kart Championship in 2007 and was runner-up in the German Challenger Kart Championship in 2008.

In 2009, Binder began his formula racing career by competing in the ADAC Formel Masters series for the Abt Sportsline team. Whilst his teammate Daniel Abt won the championship, the Austrian finished the season in seventh position with three podium finishes. Binder then moved up to the German Formula Three Championship: in 2010, he drove for Motopark Academy and finished in twelfth place in the championship, with a best result of third position; 2011 saw him move to the Jo Zeller Racing team, for whom he improved to eighth place despite missing a round of the championship; and for the 2012 season, he drove for the Van Amersfoort Racing team. In 2011, he also competed in one round of the FIA Formula Two Championship, held at the Austrian Red Bull Ring.

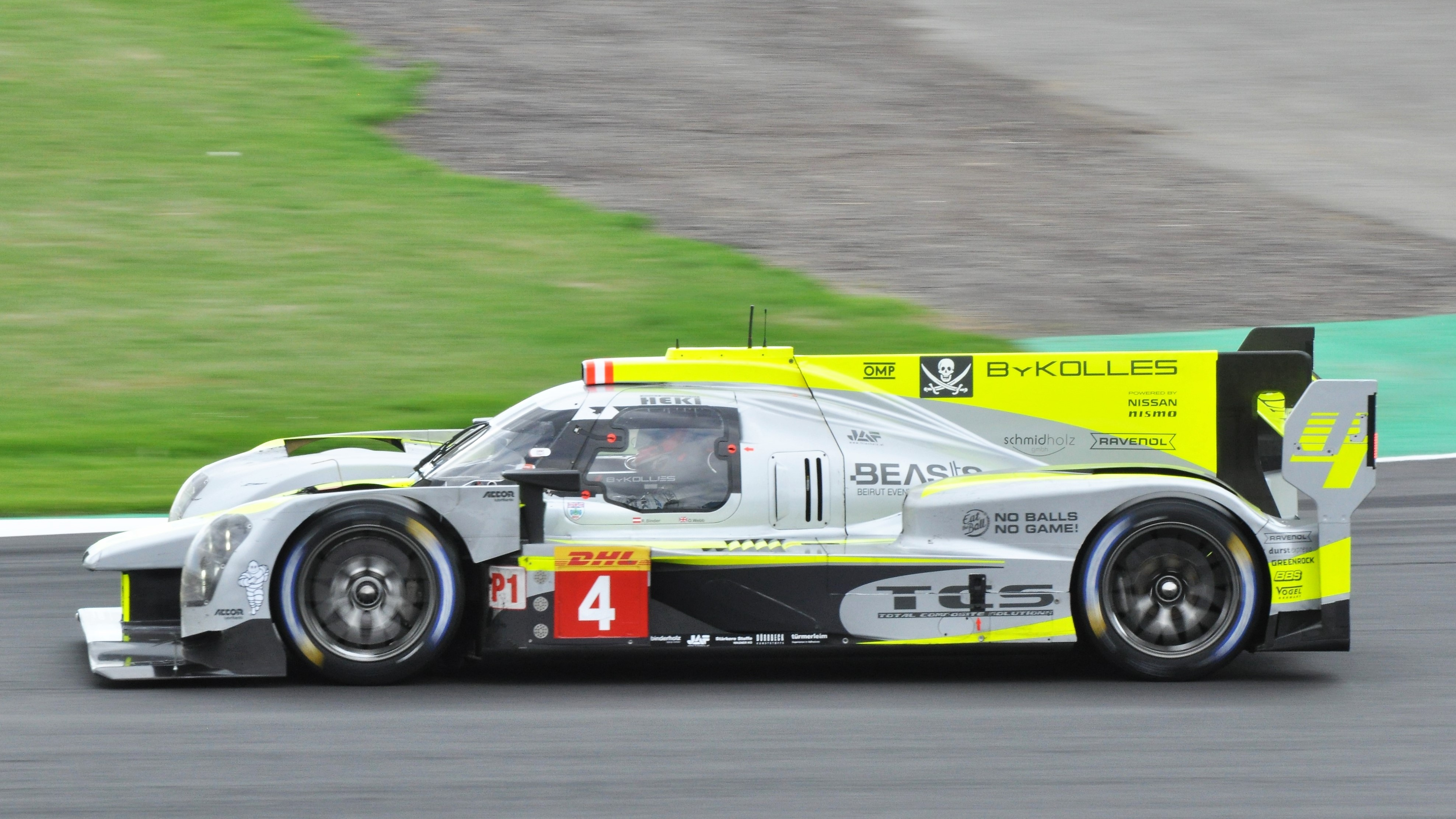
Binder driving in the 2018 6 Hours of Silverstone.

Binder made his GP2 Series début in the tenth round of the 2012 season, held at the Circuit de Spa-Francorchamps. He replaced Giancarlo Serenelli in the Lazarus team, where he partnered Sergio Canamasas. He did not score any championship points. The following year, Binder would remain at Lazarus for a full-time assault at GP2. Taking three points finishes, including a season-best sixth at Monte Carlo, the Austrian would end up 23rd in the standings.

A switch to Arden International was in order for the 2014 season, where Binder teamed up with Brazilian André Negrão. However, whilst his teammate turned out to score points regularly during the second half of the year, Binder would regress, only amassing three points on his way to 25th in the championship.

For the 2015 season, Binder partnered Ferrari Academy driver Raffaele Marciello at Trident Racing. Following a scoreless opening half of the season and after missing the round at Spa due to a streptococcus infection, Binder moved to MP Motorsport. Despite taking a pair of points finishes during his first round with the team, Binder would finish the season 22nd overall.

Binder made a change of career trajectory in 2016, moving to the Charouz Racing System-run Lotus team in the rebranded Formula V8 3.5 Series. Even though Binder was beaten in the standings by fellow Lotus driver Roy Nissany, his results progressed, as five podiums throughout the campaign earned him seventh place in the drivers' standings. Remaining with Lotus in 2017, he secured his first podium at Spa-Francorchamps and subsequently won both races at Monza, taking his first victories since 2012. Thus, Binder temporarily took the championship lead, although he would soon fall down to sixth overall following the middle portion of the season. He made up ground in Austin, winning his third race after taking pole position. He won the very last race of the year in Bahrain and finished fourth in the championship, level on points with Nissany but ahead of him in terms of wins. However, Binder would once again be beaten by his Lotus teammate, this time via eventual champion Pietro Fittipaldi.

At the end of 2017, Binder took part in a private test with the Renault Sport F1 Team, driving a rebadged Lotus E20 at the Circuit Paul Ricard.

== IndyCar and endurance racing ==
=== 2018 ===
In 2018, Binder signed a contract with Juncos Racing to run the No. 32 car in six races of the IndyCar Series. With two top-twenty race finishes, Binder ended up 28th in the standings. During the same year, he would take his first step into endurance racing, driving an LMP1 car for ByKolles Racing at the 6 Hours of Silverstone. However, the Austrian failed to see the checkered flag, as he spun out during full-course yellow conditions.

=== 2019 ===
2019 saw Binder undertake a fully-fledged assault at the sportscar scene, as he partnered Will Stevens and Julien Canal at Panis Barthez Competition in the LMP2 class of the European Le Mans Series. In addition, he would join Juncos Racing's new project in the DPi category for the Michelin Endurance Cup rounds of the IMSA calendar.

=== 2020 ===
For the following year, Binder switched to Inter Europol Competition for another season in the ELMS, teaming up with Matevos Isaakyan and Jakub Śmiechowski. With a pair of top-ten results, the outfit finished twelfth in the teams' standings.

=== 2021 ===
At the start of 2021, Binder partook in the Asian Le Mans Series alongside Yifei Ye and Ferdinand Habsburg with Algarve Pro-run G-Drive Racing. The campaign began strongly, as a fortunately timed pit stop under full-course yellow conditions granted the team victory at the season opener in Dubai. Another win followed the next day, as Binder took the lead during his opening stint before handing the car to his teammates. Despite a clean sweep by title rivals Jota at Yas Marina, second and fourth-placed finishes were enough for Binder, Ye and Habsburg to claim the title.

In the ELMS, Binder moved teams once again, this time entering as part of the Duqueine Team. He, Tristan Gommendy, and Memo Rojas ran in the upper midfield for the majority of the season, with a highlight coming at Spa-Francorchamps, where the team finished second. Fifth place overall would end up being Duqueine's final result.

=== 2022 ===
Originally slated to join G-Drive alongside Daniil Kvyat and James Allen in the FIA World Endurance Championship for the 2022 season, the Russian invasion of Ukraine and subsequent withdrawal of the team forced Binder and Allen to enter the series under the Algarve Pro Racing banner, driving alongside bronze-rated Steven Thomas in the LMP2 Pro-Am category. The year turned out to yield success, as the trio took a class victory at the 24 Hours of Le Mans along with another class win during the subsequent round at Monza. Algarve Pro ended up second in the Pro-Am classification, 23 points behind AF Corse.

=== 2023 ===
Following a driver ranking upgrade from silver to gold in 2023, Binder returned to the European Le Mans Series with Duqueine, this time teamed up with Neel Jani and Nico Pino. The team began the season with a class win at Barcelona, missing out on overall victory to the Pro-Am Racing Team Turkey entry of Louis Delétraz. A second place overall in Le Castellet followed, however this would be Duqueine's final podium of the year, with them missing out on a spot in the championship's top three by season's end. The closest they came was at the Portimão season finale, where Binder charged from sixth to second during a weather-affected middle stint, before teammate Jani was involved in an incident later on.

In July of the same year, Binder, Jani, and Pino entered into the 24 Hours of Le Mans under the Duqueine banner, taking third overall despite suffering a broken suspension on the final corner of the final lap. Binder took part in the WEC rookie test at the end of the season, driving a Porsche 963 with Proton Competition. He returned to the team in December, as he partnered GT star Julien Andlauer and bronze driver Giorgio Roda in the Asian Le Mans Series. The trio scored three podiums in a campaign which went into early 2024, leaving Proton second in the standings.

=== 2024 ===
Binder remained at Proton for the 2024 ELMS season, being part of the team's Pro-Am lineup alongside Bent Viscaal and Giorgio Roda. After a fifth place in class at Barcelona, the trio managed to score a second place at Le Castellet.

== Personal life ==
Binder married a woman named Melanie in November 2017. His family runs the company Binderholz, a manufacturer of solid wood products, whose 2018 revenue reached up to 1.3 billion euros.

== Racing record ==
=== Racing career summary ===
| Season | Series | Team | Races | Wins | Poles | F/Laps | Podiums | Points | Position |
|---|---|---|---|---|---|---|---|---|---|
| 2009 | ADAC Formel Masters | Team Abt Sportsline | 16 | 0 | 0 | 1 | 3 | 90 | 7th |
| 2010 | ATS Formel 3 Cup | Motopark Academy | 18 | 0 | 0 | 0 | 1 | 12 | 12th |
| 2011 | ATS Formel 3 Cup | Jo Zeller Racing | 16 | 0 | 0 | 0 | 1 | 26 | 8th |
| 2011 | FIA Formula Two Championship | MotorSport Vision | 2 | 0 | 0 | 0 | 0 | 0 | 28th |
| 2012 | ATS Formel 3 Cup | Van Amersfoort Racing | 27 | 3 | 0 | 1 | 7 | 191 | 6th |
| 2012 | GP2 Series | Venezuela GP Lazarus | 6 | 0 | 0 | 0 | 0 | 0 | 31st |
| 2013 | GP2 Series | Venezuela GP Lazarus | 21 | 0 | 0 | 0 | 0 | 11 | 23rd |
| 2014 | GP2 Series | Arden International | 22 | 0 | 0 | 0 | 0 | 3 | 25th |
| 2015 | GP2 Series | Trident | 12 | 0 | 0 | 0 | 0 | 2 | 22nd |
| 2015 | GP2 Series | MP Motorsport | 7 | 0 | 0 | 0 | 0 | 2 | 22nd |
| 2015 | Formula Renault 3.5 Series | Pons Racing | 2 | 0 | 0 | 0 | 0 | 4 | 22nd |
| 2016 | Formula V8 3.5 Series | Lotus | 18 | 0 | 0 | 0 | 5 | 161 | 7th |
| 2016 | GP2 Series | ART Grand Prix | 2 | 0 | 0 | 0 | 0 | 0 | 23rd |
| 2016 | GP2 Series | Carlin | 2 | 0 | 0 | 0 | 0 | 0 | 23rd |
| 2017 | World Series Formula V8 3.5 | Lotus | 18 | 4 | 2 | 2 | 5 | 201 | 4th |
| 2017 | FIA Formula 2 Championship | Rapax | 2 | 0 | 0 | 0 | 0 | 0 | 28th |
| 2018 | IndyCar Series | Juncos Racing | 6 | 0 | 0 | 0 | 0 | 61 | 28th |
| 2018–19 | FIA World Endurance Championship | ByKolles Racing Team | 1 | 0 | 0 | 0 | 0 | 0 | NC |
| 2019 | European Le Mans Series - LMP2 | Panis Barthez Competition | 6 | 0 | 0 | 0 | 0 | 19.5 | 18th |
| 2019 | 24 Hours of Le Mans - LMP2 | Panis Barthez Competition | 1 | 0 | 0 | 0 | 0 | N/A | 8th |
| 2019 | IMSA SportsCar Championship - DPi | Juncos Racing | 4 | 0 | 0 | 0 | 0 | 88 | 18th |
| 2020 | European Le Mans Series - LMP2 | Inter Europol Competition | 5 | 0 | 0 | 0 | 0 | 15.5 | 16th |
| 2020 | 24 Hours of Le Mans - LMP2 | Inter Europol Competition | 1 | 0 | 0 | 0 | 0 | N/A | 17th |
| 2021 | European Le Mans Series - LMP2 | Duqueine Team | 6 | 0 | 0 | 0 | 1 | 52 | 7th |
| 2021 | Asian Le Mans Series - LMP2 | G-Drive Racing | 4 | 2 | 0 | 0 | 3 | 81 | **1st** |
| 2022 | FIA World Endurance Championship - LMP2 | Algarve Pro Racing | 6 | 0 | 0 | 0 | 0 | 10 | 19th |
| 2022 | 24 Hours of Le Mans - LMP2 | Algarve Pro Racing | 1 | 0 | 0 | 0 | 0 | N/A | 15th |
| 2023 | European Le Mans Series - LMP2 | Duqueine Team | 6 | 1 | 0 | 0 | 2 | 79 | 4th |
| 2023 | 24 Hours of Le Mans - LMP2 | Duqueine Team | 1 | 0 | 0 | 0 | 1 | N/A | **3rd** |
| 2023–24 | Asian Le Mans Series - LMP2 | Proton Competition | 5 | 0 | 0 | 0 | 3 | 71 | **2nd** |
| 2024 | European Le Mans Series - LMP2 Pro-Am | Proton Competition | 6 | 1 | 0 | 0 | 4 | 95 | **3rd** |
| 2024 | 24 Hours of Le Mans - LMP2 Pro-Am | DKR Engineering | 1 | 0 | 0 | 0 | 1 | N/A | **3rd** |
| 2025 | European Le Mans Series - LMP2 Pro-Am | Proton Competition | 6 | 0 | 0 | 0 | 1 | 66 | 6th |
| 2025 | 24 Hours of Le Mans - LMP2 Pro-Am | Proton Competition | 1 | 0 | 0 | 0 | 1 | N/A | **3rd** |
| 2026 | European Le Mans Series - LMP2 | Proton Competition | 6 | 0 | 0 | 0 | 0 | 6 | 16th |

=== Complete ADAC Formel Masters results ===
(key) (Races in bold indicate pole position) (Races in italics indicate fastest lap)

| Year | Team | 1 | 2 | 3 | 4 | 5 | 6 | 7 | 8 | 9 | 10 | 11 | 12 | 13 | 14 | 15 | 16 | Pos | Points |
|---|---|---|---|---|---|---|---|---|---|---|---|---|---|---|---|---|---|---|---|
| 2009 | Team Abt Sportsline | OSC1; 1; 3 | OSC1; 2; 10 | ASS; 1; 5 | ASS; 2 Ret | NÜR1; 1; 7 | NÜR1; 2 Ret | HOC; 1; 3 | HOC; 2; 12 | LAU; 1; 6 | LAU; 2 Ret | NÜR2; 1; 2 | NÜR2; 2; 5 | SAC; 1; 6 | SAC; 2; 9 | OSC2; 1; 6 | OSC2; 2; 4 | 7th | 90 |

=== Complete German Formula Three Championship results ===
(key) (Races in bold indicate pole position) (Races in italics indicate fastest lap)

| Year | Entrant | 1 | 2 | 3 | 4 | 5 | 6 | 7 | 8 | 9 | 10 | 11 | 12 | 13 | 14 | 15 | 16 | 17 | 18 | 19 | 20 | 21 | 22 | 23 | 24 | 25 | 26 | 27 | DC | Points |
|---|---|---|---|---|---|---|---|---|---|---|---|---|---|---|---|---|---|---|---|---|---|---|---|---|---|---|---|---|---|---|
| 2010 | Motopark Academy | OSC1; 1; 10 | OSC1; 2 Ret | SAC; 1; 13 | SAC; 2; 12 | HOC; 1; 12 | HOC; 2; 14 | ASS1; 1; 12 | ASS1; 2 Ret | NÜR1; 1; 4 | NÜR1; 2; 10 | ASS2; 1; 8 | ASS2; 2; 3 | LAU; 1; 16† | LAU; 2; 16 | NÜR2; 1 Ret | NÜR2; 2; 16 | OSC2; 1 Ret | OSC2; 2; 13 | | | | | | | | | | 12th | 12 |
| 2011 | Jo Zeller Racing | OSC; 1; 6 | OSC; 2; 3 | SPA; 1 Ret | SPA; 2; 4 | SAC; 1 | SAC; 2 | ASS1; 1; 6 | ASS1; 2 Ret | ZOL; 1; 15† | ZOL; 2; 9 | RBR; 1; 10 | RBR; 2; 9 | LAU; 1; 11 | LAU; 2; 7 | ASS2; 1; 7 | ASS2; 2 DNS | HOC; 1; 5 | HOC; 2; 9 | | | | | | | | | | 8th | 26 |
| 2012 | Van Amersfoort Racing | ZAN; 1; 4 | ZAN; 2; 2 | ZAN; 3; 13† | SAC; 1; 8 | SAC; 2; 1 | SAC; 3; 7 | OSC; 1; 6 | OSC; 2; 4 | OSC; 2; 7 | SPA; 1; 3 | SPA; 2; 6 | SPA; 3; 1 | ASS; 1; 2 | ASS; 2 Ret | ASS; 3; 7 | RBR; 1 DNS | RBR; 2; 5 | RBR; 3; 9 | LAU; 1; 5 | LAU; 2; 2 | LAU; 3; 7 | NÜR; 1; 8 | NÜR; 2; 1 | NÜR; 3 Ret | HOC; 1; 7 | HOC; 2; 5 | HOC; 3; 9 | 6th | 191 |

=== Complete FIA Formula Two Championship results ===
(key) (Races in bold indicate pole position) (Races in italics indicate fastest lap)

| Year | 1 | 2 | 3 | 4 | 5 | 6 | 7 | 8 | 9 | 10 | 11 | 12 | 13 | 14 | 15 | 16 | Pos | Points |
|---|---|---|---|---|---|---|---|---|---|---|---|---|---|---|---|---|---|---|
| 2011 | SIL; 1 | SIL; 2 | MAG; 1 | MAG; 2 | SPA; 1 | SPA; 2 | NÜR; 1 | NÜR; 2 | BRH; 1 | BRH; 2 | RBR; 1; 16 | RBR; 2; 13 | MON; 1 | MON; 2 | CAT; 1 | CAT; 2 | 28th | 0 |

=== Complete GP2 Series/FIA Formula 2 Championship results ===
(key) (Races in bold indicate pole position) (Races in italics indicate fastest lap)

| Year | Entrant | 1 | 2 | 3 | 4 | 5 | 6 | 7 | 8 | 9 | 10 | 11 | 12 | 13 | 14 | 15 | 16 | 17 | 18 | 19 | 20 | 21 | 22 | 23 | 24 | DC | Points |
|---|---|---|---|---|---|---|---|---|---|---|---|---|---|---|---|---|---|---|---|---|---|---|---|---|---|---|---|
| 2012 | Venezuela GP Lazarus | SEP; FEA | SEP; SPR | BHR1; FEA | BHR1; SPR | BHR2; FEA | BHR2; SPR | CAT; FEA | CAT; SPR | MON; FEA | MON; SPR | VAL; FEA | VAL; SPR | SIL; FEA | SIL; SPR | HOC; FEA | HOC; SPR | HUN; FEA | HUN; SPR | SPA; FEA; 19 | SPA; SPR; 17 | MNZ; FEA; 17 | MNZ; SPR; 13 | MRN; FEA; Ret | MRN; SPR; Ret | 31st | 0 |
| 2013 | Venezuela GP Lazarus | SEP; FEA; 11 | SEP; SPR; 8 | BHR; FEA; 18 | BHR; SPR; 25 | CAT; FEA; 20 | CAT; SPR; 19 | MON; FEA; 7 | MON; SPR; 6 | SIL; FEA; 16 | SIL; SPR; 13 | NÜR; FEA; 20 | NÜR; SPR; 10 | HUN; FEA; 22 | HUN; SPR; 13 | SPA; FEA; DNS | SPA; SPR; 20 | MNZ; FEA; 16 | MNZ; SPR; 14 | MRN; FEA; 18 | MRN; SPR; 9 | YMC; FEA; 15 | YMC; SPR; 16 | | | 23rd | 11 |
| 2014 | Arden International | BHR; FEA; 9 | BHR; SPR; 8 | CAT; FEA; 15 | CAT; SPR; Ret | MON; FEA; Ret | MON; SPR; 20 | RBR; FEA; 12 | RBR; SPR; 12 | SIL; FEA; 24 | SIL; SPR; 19 | HOC; FEA; 11 | HOC; SPR; 22 | HUN; FEA; 20 | HUN; SPR; 14 | SPA; FEA; Ret | SPA; SPR; 23 | MNZ; FEA; 20 | MNZ; SPR; Ret | SOC; FEA; 23 | SOC; SPR; Ret | YMC; FEA; Ret | YMC; SPR; 23 | | | 25th | 3 |
| 2015 | Trident | BHR; FEA; 17 | BHR; SPR; Ret | CAT; FEA; 22 | CAT; SPR; Ret | MON; FEA; 11 | MON; SPR; 16 | RBR; FEA; 17 | RBR; SPR; 14 | SIL; FEA; 17 | SIL; SPR; 18 | HUN; FEA; 23 | HUN; SPR; 24 | SPA; FEA | SPA; SPR | | | | | | | | | | | 22nd | 2 |
| 2015 | MP Motorsport | | | | | | | | | | | | | | | MNZ; FEA; 10 | MNZ; SPR; 8 | SOC; FEA; 16 | SOC; SPR; Ret | BHR; FEA; 20 | BHR; SPR; Ret | YMC; FEA; 14 | YMC; SPR; C | | | 22nd | 2 |
| 2016 | ART Grand Prix | CAT; FEA | CAT; SPR | MON; FEA | MON; SPR | BAK; FEA | BAK; SPR | RBR; FEA; 16 | RBR; SPR; 15 | SIL; FEA | SIL; SPR | HUN; FEA | HUN; SPR | | | | | | | | | | | | | 23rd | 0 |
| 2016 | Carlin | | | | | | | | | | | | | HOC; FEA; 13 | HOC; SPR; 15 | SPA; FEA | SPA; SPR | MNZ; FEA | MNZ; SPR | SEP; FEA | SEP; SPR | YMC; FEA | YMC; SPR | | | 23rd | 0 |
| 2017 | Rapax | BHR; FEA | BHR; SPR | CAT; FEA | CAT; SPR | MON; FEA | MON; SPR | BAK; FEA | BAK; SPR | RBR; FEA | RBR; SPR | SIL; FEA | SIL; SPR | HUN; FEA | HUN; SPR | SPA; FEA | SPA; SPR | MNZ; FEA | MNZ; SPR | JER; FEA; 15 | JER; SPR; 17 | YMC; FEA | YMC; SPR | | | 28th | 0 |

=== Complete World Series Formula V8 3.5 results ===
(key) (Races in bold indicate pole position; races in italics indicate fastest lap)

| Year | Team | 1 | 2 | 3 | 4 | 5 | 6 | 7 | 8 | 9 | 10 | 11 | 12 | 13 | 14 | 15 | 16 | 17 | 18 | Pos | Points |
|---|---|---|---|---|---|---|---|---|---|---|---|---|---|---|---|---|---|---|---|---|---|
| 2015 | Pons Racing | ALC; 1 | ALC; 2 | MON; 1 | SPA; 1 | SPA; 2 | HUN; 1 | HUN; 2 | RBR; 1 | RBR; 2 | SIL; 1 | SIL; 2 | NÜR; 1; 13 | NÜR; 2; 8 | BUG; 1 | BUG; 2 | JER; 1 | JER; 2 | | 22nd | 4 |
| 2016 | Lotus | ALC; 1; 4 | ALC; 2; 3 | HUN; 1; 11 | HUN; 2; 7 | SPA; 1; 5 | SPA; 2; 6 | LEC; 1; 3 | LEC; 2; 5 | SIL; 1; 3 | SIL; 2; 2 | RBR; 1 Ret | RBR; 2; 12 | MNZ; 1; 5 | MNZ; 2; 2 | JER; 1; 5 | JER; 2; 7 | CAT; 1 Ret | CAT; 2; 6 | 7th | 161 |
| 2017 | Lotus | SIL; 1; 5 | SIL; 2; 4 | SPA; 1; 6 | SPA; 2; 2 | MNZ; 1; 1 | MNZ; 2; 1 | JER; 1; 4 | JER; 2; 5 | ALC; 1; 5 | ALC; 2 Ret | NÜR; 1; 6 | NÜR; 2; 9 | MEX; 1; 6 | MEX; 2 Ret | **COA**; **1**; 1 | COA; 2; 10 | BHR; 1; 9 | **BHR**; **2**; 1 | 4th | 201 |

=== American open-wheel racing results ===
(key) (Races in bold indicate pole position) (Races in italics indicate fastest lap)

==== IndyCar Series ====
(key)

| Year | Team | No. | Chassis | Engine | 1 | 2 | 3 | 4 | 5 | 6 | 7 | 8 | 9 | 10 | 11 | 12 | 13 | 14 | 15 | 16 | 17 | Rank | Points | Ref |
|---|---|---|---|---|---|---|---|---|---|---|---|---|---|---|---|---|---|---|---|---|---|---|---|---|
| 2018 | Juncos Racing | 32 | Dallara DW12 | Chevrolet | STP; 22 | PHX | LBH | ALA; 16 | IMS | INDY | DET; 21 | DET; 22 | TXS | ROA | IOW | TOR; 17 | MDO; 21 | POC | GTW | POR | SNM | 28th | 61 | |

=== Complete FIA World Endurance Championship results ===
| Year | Entrant | Class | Car | Engine | 1 | 2 | 3 | 4 | 5 | 6 | 7 | 8 | Rank | Points |
|---|---|---|---|---|---|---|---|---|---|---|---|---|---|---|
| 2018–19 | ByKolles Racing Team | LMP1 | ENSO CLM P1/01 | Nismo VRX30A 3.0 L Turbo V6 | SPA | LMS | SIL; Ret | FUJ | SHA | SEB | SPA | | NC | 0 |
| 2018–19 | Panis Barthez Competition | LMP2 | Ligier JS P217 | Gibson GK428 4.2 L V8 | | | | | | | | LMS; 8 | NC | 0 |
| 2019-20 | Inter Europol Competition | LMP2 | Ligier JS P217 | Gibson GK428 4.2 L V8 | SIL | FUJ | SHA | BHR | COA | SPA | LMS; 17 | BHR | NC | 0 |
| 2021 | Duqueine Team | LMP2 | Oreca 07 | Gibson GK428 4.2L V8 | SPA | ALG | MNZ | LMS; 9 | BHR | BHR | | | NC | 0 |
| 2022 | Algarve Pro Racing | LMP2 | Oreca 07 | Gibson GK428 4.2 L V8 | SEB; 11 | SPA; 11 | LMS; 9 | MNZ; 7 | FUJ; 13 | BHR; 12 | | | 19th | 10 |

=== Complete IMSA SportsCar Championship results ===
(key) (Races in bold indicate pole position; races in italics indicate fastest lap)

| Year | Entrant | Class | Make | Engine | 1 | 2 | 3 | 4 | 5 | 6 | 7 | 8 | 9 | 10 | Rank | Points |
|---|---|---|---|---|---|---|---|---|---|---|---|---|---|---|---|---|
| 2019 | Juncos Racing | DPi | Cadillac DPi-V.R | Cadillac 5.5 L V8 | DAY; 8 | SEB; 10 | LBH | MDO | DET | WGL; 8 | MOS | ELK | LGA | PET; 10 | 18th | 88 |

=== Complete European Le Mans Series results ===
(key) (Races in bold indicate pole position; results in italics indicate fastest lap)

| Year | Entrant | Class | Chassis | Engine | 1 | 2 | 3 | 4 | 5 | 6 | Rank | Points |
|---|---|---|---|---|---|---|---|---|---|---|---|---|
| 2019 | Panis Barthez Competition | LMP2 | Ligier JS P217 | Gibson GK428 4.2 L V8 | LEC; 10 | MNZ; 9 | CAT; 15 | SIL; 7 | SPA; 8 | ALG; 7 | 18th | 19.5 |
| 2020 | Inter Europol Competition | LMP2 | Ligier JS P217 | Gibson GK428 4.2 L V8 | LEC; 7 | SPA; 11 | LEC; 6 | MNZ; 12 | ALG; Ret | | 16th | 15.5 |
| 2021 | Duqueine Team | LMP2 | Oreca 07 | Gibson GK428 4.2 L V8 | CAT; 6 | RBR; 9 | LEC; 4 | MNZ; 5 | SPA; 2 | ALG; Ret | 7th | 52 |
| 2023 | Duqueine Team | LMP2 | Oreca 07 | Gibson GK428 4.2 L V8 | CAT; 1 | LEC; 2 | ARA; 6 | SPA; 6 | POR; 5 | ALG; 5 | 4th | 79 |
| 2024 | Proton Competition | LMP2 Pro-Am | Oreca 07 | Gibson GK428 4.2 L V8 | **CAT**; 5 | **LEC**; 2 | **IMO**; 8 | SPA; 2 | **MUG**; 3 | **ALG**; 1 | 3rd | 95 |
| 2025 | Proton Competition | LMP2 Pro-Am | Oreca 07 | Gibson GK428 4.2 L V8 | **CAT**; 4 | LEC; 4 | **IMO**; 2 | **SPA**; 6 | SIL; Ret | **ALG**; 4 | 6th | 66 |
| 2026 | Proton Competition | LMP2 Pro-Am | Oreca 07 | Gibson GK428 4.2 L V8 | CAT; 9 | LEC; 12 | IMO; 10 | SPA; 9 | SIL; 12 | ALG; 10 | 16th | 6 |

=== Complete 24 Hours of Le Mans results ===
| Year | Team | Co-Drivers | Car | Class | Laps | Pos. | Class Pos. |
|---|---|---|---|---|---|---|---|
| 2019 | (France) Panis Barthez Competition | (France) Julien Canal (United Kingdom) Will Stevens | Ligier JS P217-Gibson | LMP2 | 362 | 13th | 8th |
| 2020 | (Poland) Inter Europol Competition | (Poland) Jakub Śmiechowski (Russia) Matevos Isaakyan | Ligier JS P217-Gibson | LMP2 | 325 | 42nd | 17th |
| 2021 | (France) Duqueine Team | (France) Tristan Gommendy (Mexico) Memo Rojas | Oreca 07-Gibson | LMP2 | 357 | 14th | 9th |
| 2022 | (Portugal) Algarve Pro Racing | (Australia) James Allen (United States) Steven Thomas | Oreca 07-Gibson | LMP2 | 363 | 19th | 15th |
| 2023 | (France) Duqueine Team | (Switzerland) Neel Jani (Chile) Nico Pino | Oreca 07-Gibson | LMP2 | 327 | 11th | **3rd** |
| 2024 | (Luxembourg) DKR Engineering | (Germany) Laurents Hörr (Germany) Alexander Mattschull | Oreca 07-Gibson | LMP2 | 195 | 21st | 7th |
| 2024 | (Luxembourg) DKR Engineering | (Germany) Laurents Hörr (Germany) Alexander Mattschull | Oreca 07-Gibson | LMP2 Pro-Am | 195 | 21st | **3rd** |
| 2025 | (Germany) Proton Competition | (Italy) Giorgio Roda (Netherlands) Bent Viscaal | Oreca 07-Gibson | LMP2 | 365 | 23rd | 6th |
| 2025 | (Germany) Proton Competition | (Italy) Giorgio Roda (Netherlands) Bent Viscaal | Oreca 07-Gibson | LMP2 Pro-Am | 365 | 23rd | **3rd** |

=== Complete Asian Le Mans Series results ===
(key) (Races in bold indicate pole position) (Races in italics indicate fastest lap)

| Year | Team | Class | Car | Engine | 1 | 2 | 3 | 4 | 5 | Pos. | Points |
|---|---|---|---|---|---|---|---|---|---|---|---|
| 2021 | G-Drive Racing | LMP2 | Aurus 01 | Gibson GK428 4.2 L V8 | DUB; 1; 1 | DUB; 2; 1 | ABU; 1; 2 | **ABU**; **2**; 4 | | 1st | 81 |
| 2023–24 | Proton Competition | LMP2 | Oreca 07 | Gibson GK428 4.2 L V8 | SEP; 1; 5 | SEP; 2; 3 | DUB; 2 | ABU; 1; 5 | ABU; 2; 2 | 2nd | 71 |

Sporting positions
| Preceded by Roman Rusinov; James French; Leonard Hoogenboom | Asian Le Mans Series; LMP2 Champion; 2021; With: Ferdinand von Habsburg & Yifei Ye | Succeeded by Ben Hanley; Matt Bell; Rodrigo Sales |
