= Margarethe Binder =

Margarethe Binder (1801 – 1870) was an actress. She was engaged at the Estates Theatre in Prague in 1824–1854, where she belonged to the theatre's star attractions. She was known for her roles as heroine and later comic old women and queens.

== Biography ==
Margarethe Binder was the daughter of the acting couple Carl Mayer and Philippine Mayer. Her parents where engaged at the Dresden Court Theatre, where she made her debut as a child actor in 1807. She followed her parents on their tours and engagements and made her debut as an adult actor in St. Petersburg in Russia in 1816 and Revaler Theater in Reval in Estonia the same year. She married the Baltic German aristocrat Baron Jacob von der Klogen in 1817, but did not use her married name on stage, rather used her original name as her stage name. She was engaged in Bremen, Hannover, Dresden, Wroclaw and in 1824 in Prague, where she was given a contract the following year. In 1825, she was widowed and remarried the tenor Sebastian Binder. She made guest appearances to great acclaim in Budapest (October 1826), Vienna (Burgtheater 1828, 1831) and Dresden (1835).

Binder was successful in the parts of naive ingenue heroines in the sentimental romantic dramas of the time. She was described as a graceful and with a voice she could model in all manners of expressions necessary for her parts. Among her more known parts where Scribe's Yelva, Fenella, and Auber's Die Stumme von Portici. The great majority of her career was spent in Prague where she was described as very popular with the audience. In the late 1830s, she started to perform in character and comical roles, and noted for her queen's roles, such as Elizabeth in William Shakespeare's Richard III.
