= Reinhold Binder =

Austrian politician (born 1978)

Member of the National Council
- Incumbent
- Assumed office 24 October 2024

Personal details
- Born: 12 August 1978 (age 47) Kirchdorf an der Krems, Austria
- Party: Social Democratic Party

Reinhold Binder (born 12 August 1978) is an Austrian trade unionist and politician of the Social Democratic Party. He was elected member of the National Council in the 2024 legislative election, and has served as chairman of PRO-GE since 2023.
