= Sebastian Binder =

Austrian opera singer

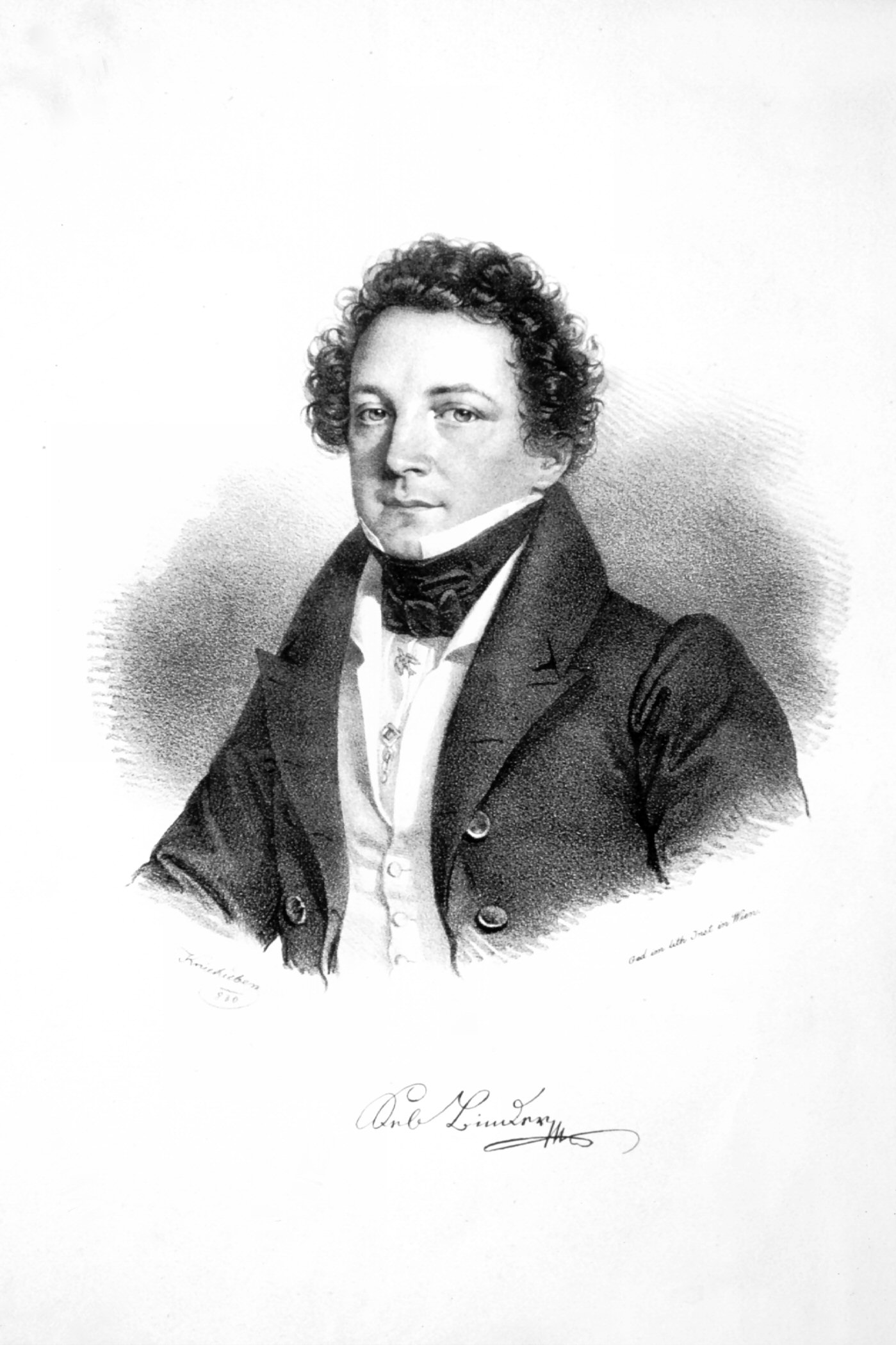
Lithograph by Josef Kriehuber

Sebastian Binder (1792 – 15 January 1845) was an Austrian operatic tenor.

== Life ==
Binder was born in Prague in 1792. His career began in Vienna, in the chorus at the Theater an der Wien and at the Theater am Kärntnertor. He was subsequently a soloist in Linz and Graz, and from 1815 to 1818 appeared at the Vienna Court Opera.

From 1822 to 1829 he was engaged at the Estates Theatre in Prague. During this period he made guest appearances in Leipzig, Budapest and Berlin. In 1825 he married the actress Margarethe von der Klogen; they were divorced in 1836.

After his time in Prague he was engaged at the Court Opera in Dresden and at the Court Opera in Vienna; he made guest appearances in other cities.

In Vienna he became very successful, and was regarded as a rival to the celebrated opera singer Franz Wild. His success was due to the quality of his voice rather than his appearance, since his figure was not effective in heroic roles. Excessive drinking affected the sonority of his voice, and ended his operatic career. From 1842 he was a singing teacher in Budapest; he died there in 1845.

=== Roles ===
Roles played included Adolar in Weber's opera Euryanthe and Huon in Weber's Oberon (both premieres in Prague of the operas); also Don Ottavio in Mozart's Don Giovanni and Tamino in Mozart's The Magic Flute.
