= Pinder (surname) =

Pinder is the surname of the following people:

- Andrew Pinder, British corporate director
- Beverley Pinder, Australian executive
- Branden Pinder, American baseball player
- Chad Pinder, American baseball player
- Charles Pinder, Anglican priest
- Cyril Pinder, American footballer
- Demetrius Pinder, Bahamian sprinter
- Enrique Pinder, Panamanian boxer
- George F. Pinder (born 1942), American engineer
- George Pinder (cricketer), 19th-century English cricketer
- Gerry Pinder, Canadian ice hockey player
- Herb Pinder (ice hockey)
- Herb Pinder, Canadian politician
- Holm Pinder, German footballer
- Jack Pinder, English football player
- James K. Pinder, British-Canadian politician
- Jefferson Pinder, American artist
- John J. Pinder Jr. (1912–1944), U.S. soldier
- John Pinder (comedy producer), New Zealand-Australian
- John Pinder (RAF officer)
- John Pinder II, Bahamian politician
- Jordan Pinder, Canadian curler
- Julian T. Pinder, Canadian film director
- Keanu Pinder, Australian-Bahamian basketball player
- Leslie Hall Pinder, Canadian lawyer and poet
- Lucy Pinder, British glamour model and actress
- Mike Pinder (1941–2024), English musician
- Nelson Pinder, Florida activist
- Patrick Pinder, Catholic archbishop of Nassau, Bahamas
- Philip Pinder, Bahamian boxer
- Powis Pinder (1872–1941), English actor and singer
- Ralph Pinder-Wilson, British art historian
- Robert Mitford Pinder, Canadian politician
- Ryan Pinder, Bahamian politician
- Sam Pinder, New Zealand-Scottish rugby player
- Steven Pinder, British actor
- Tiny Pinder (born 1956), Bahamian basketballer
- Troy Pinder, Bahamian footballer
