= Jimmy Eriksson =

Swedish race car driver (born 1991)

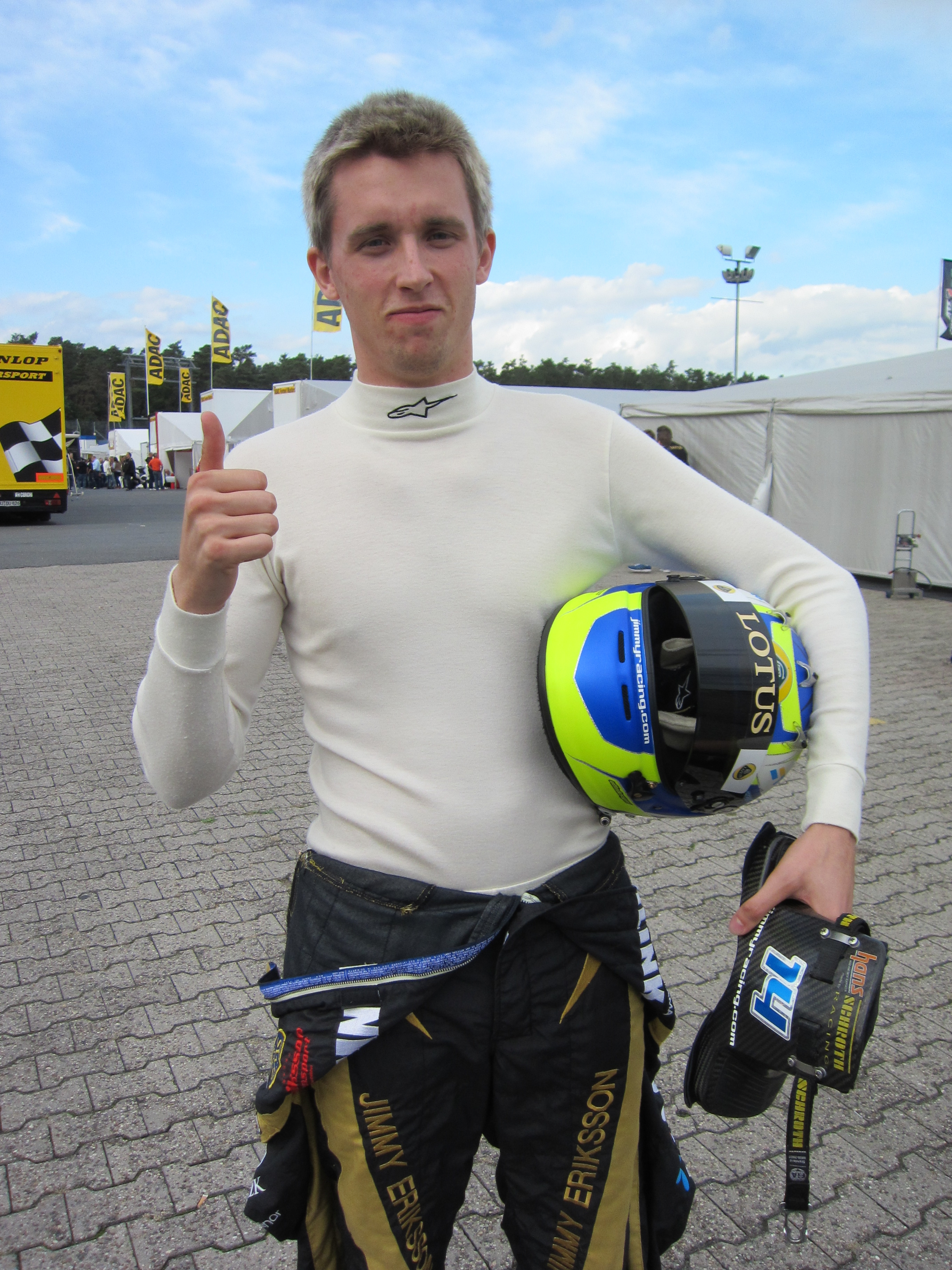
- Jimmy Eriksson in 2012
- Nationality: (Sweden) Swedish
- Born: Jimmy Joakim Eriksson; 14 March 1991 (age 35) Tomelilla, Sweden
- Relatives: Joel Eriksson (brother)

GP2 Series career
- Debut season: 2016
- Categorisation: FIA Gold (2014–2021); FIA Silver (2022–)
- Car number: 25
- Former teams: Arden International
- Starts: 18
- Wins: 0
- Poles: 0
- Fastest laps: 0
- Best finish: 20th in 2016

Previous series
- 2010, 12 2010-11 2009 2009 2009 2009 2015: German Formula Three; Formula 3 Euro Series; Formula Renault 2.0 NEC; Formula Renault 2.0 NEZ; Formula Renault 2.0 Sweden; Eurocup Formula Renault 2.0

Championship titles
- 2012: German Formula Three

Jimmy Joakim Eriksson (born 14 March 1991 in Tomelilla) is a Swedish race car driver who drove in the GP2 Series for Arden International and Blancpain GT Series for HTP Motorsport. He is the brother of Joel Eriksson.

== Career ==
=== Karting ===
Eriksson made his karting debut in 2005, at the age of fourteen. In 2008, he was champion of the Swedish Formula Yamaha Championship.

=== Formula Renault ===
Eriksson began his car racing career by driving in the Formula Renault 2.0 Northern European Cup with Motopark Academy in 2009. He took a victory at Alastaro Circuit along with fourteen point-scoring positions to finish sixteenth in championship. He also competed in some races of Formula Renault 2.0 NEZ, Formula Renault 2.0 Sweden and Eurocup Formula Renault 2.0, all with Motopark.

=== Formula Three ===
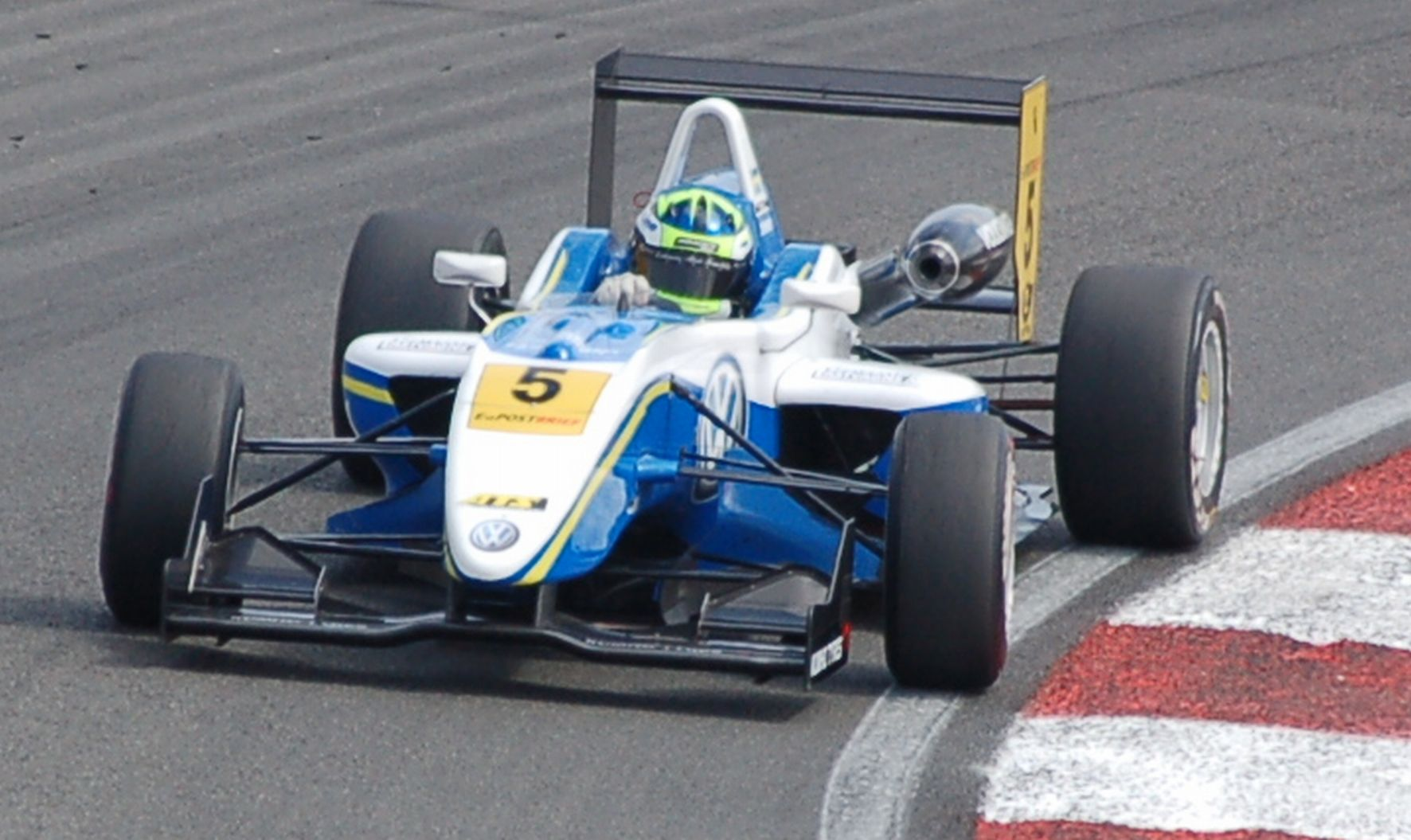
Jimmy Eriksson in 2011

In 2010, Eriksson stepped up to the German Formula Three Championship with the Motopark Academy team. finishing sixth in points. He moved to the Formula 3 Euro Series in 2011, finishing ninth. Eriksson returned to German Formula Three in 2012, winning the championship with eight wins and 17 podiums in 27 races.

=== GP3 Series ===
In 2013, Eriksson progressed to GP3 Series, scoring no points for Status Grand Prix. In 2014, he joined Koiranen GP, ranking fourth in the drivers' championship. Continuing with Koiranen in 2015, Eriksson finished fifth in points.

=== GP2 Series ===
On 29 April 2016, Eriksson was announced at driving at the GP2 Series for Arden International. He scored points once at the Austria feature race with a fifth-place finish, but missed the final two rounds due to financial setbacks.

=== GT racing ===
In 2017, Eriksson was signed by HTP Motorsport to drive a Mercedes-AMG GT3 at the Blancpain GT Series Sprint Cup. Partnering with Dominik Baumann, he finished fifth at the Misano feature race, and seventh at the Hungary feature race.

== Personal life ==
Eriksson's younger brother, Joel Eriksson, is also a racing driver, and most recently raced in Formula E in 2021.

== Racing career ==
=== Career summary ===
Season	Series	Team	Races	Wins	Poles	F/Laps	Podiums	Points	Position
2009	Formula Renault 2.0 NEC	Motopark Academy	16	1	1	1	1	113	15th
2009	Formula Renault 2.0 NEZ	Motopark Academy	4	0	0	0	1	47	10th
2009	Formula Renault 2.0 Sweden	Motopark Academy	4	0	0	0	1	16	9th
2009	Eurocup Formula Renault 2.0	Motopark Academy	2	0	0	0	0	N/A	NC†
2010	German Formula 3 Championship	Motopark Academy	17	1	0	0	3	43	6th
2010	Formula 3 Euro Series	Motopark Academy	2	0	0	0	0	N/A	NC†
2011	Formula 3 Euro Series	Motopark Academy	27	0	0	0	0	93	9th
2012	German Formula 3 Championship	Lotus	27	8	8	9	17	408	**1st**
2013	GP3 Series	Status Grand Prix	16	0	0	0	0	0	24th
2014	GP3 Series	Koiranen GP	18	2	2	0	5	134	4th
2014	Formula Acceleration 1	Acceleration Team Sweden	2	0	0	0	0	11	16th
2014	European Le Mans Series	Sébastien Loeb Racing	1	1	0	0	1	25	10th
2015	GP3 Series	Koiranen GP	18	1	0	0	3	118	5th
2016	GP2 Series	Arden International	18	0	0	0	0	10	20th
2017	Blancpain GT Series Sprint Cup	HTP Motorsport	10	0	0	0	1	21	14th
2017	Blancpain GT Series Endurance Cup	HTP Motorsport	5	0	0	0	2	52	**3rd**
2017	24H Series - A6	HTP Motorsport							
2017	Intercontinental GT Challenge	Mercedes-AMG Team HTP Motorsport	1	0	0	0	0	0	NC
2018	ADAC GT Masters	Team Rosberg	14	0	0	0	0	0	NC
2019	ADAC GT Masters	Team Zakspeed BKK Mobil Oil Racing	14	0	0	0	1	87	11th
2020	ADAC GT Masters	Team Zakspeed BKK Mobil Oil Racing	12	0	0	0	0	23	29th
2024	STCC Scandinavia Touring Car Championship	Brink Motorsport	10	4	3	3	7	185	**2nd**

^{†} As Eriksson was a guest driver, he was ineligible for points.

=== Complete Formula Renault 2.0 NEC results ===
(key) (Races in bold indicate pole position) (Races in italics indicate fastest lap)

Year	Entrant	1	2	3	4	5	6	7	8	9	10	11	12	13	14	15	16	DC	Points
2009	Motopark Academy	ZAN; 1 Ret	ZAN; 2; 18	HOC; 1; 11	HOC; 2; 17	**ALA**; **1**; 1	ALA; 2; 13	OSC; 1; 15	OSC; 2; 19	ASS; 1; 10	ASS; 2; 13	MST; 1 Ret	MST; 2; 18	NÜR; 1; 12	NÜR; 2; 16	SPA; 1; 16	SPA; 2; 12	15th	113

=== Complete Eurocup Formula Renault 2.0 results ===
(key) (Races in bold indicate pole position; races in italics indicate fastest lap)

Year	Entrant	1	2	3	4	5	6	7	8	9	10	11	12	13	14	DC	Points
2009	Motopark Academy	CAT; 1	CAT; 2	SPA; 1	SPA; 2	HUN; 1	HUN; 2	SIL; 1	SIL; 2	LMS; 1	LMS; 2	NÜR; 1; 10	NÜR; 2; 14	ALC; 1	ALC; 2	NC†	0

† As Eriksson was a guest driver, he was ineligible for points

=== Complete Formula 3 Euro Series results ===
(key)

Year	Entrant	Chassis	Engine	1	2	3	4	5	6	7	8	9	10	11	12	13	14	15	16	17	18	19	20	21	22	23	24	25	26	27	DC	Points
2010	Motopark Academy	Dallara F305/045	Volkswagen	LEC; 1	LEC; 2	HOC; 1; 11	HOC; 2 Ret	VAL; 1	VAL; 2	NOR; 1	NOR; 2	NÜR; 1	NÜR; 2	ZAN; 1	ZAN; 2	BRH; 1	BRH; 2	OSC; 1	OSC; 2	HOC; 1	HOC; 2										NC†	N/A
2011	Motopark Academy	Dallara F308/099	Volkswagen	LEC; 1; 10	LEC; 2; 9	LEC; 3; 6	HOC; 1; 9	HOC; 2; 8	HOC; 3; 7	ZAN; 1; 9	ZAN; 2; 9	ZAN; 3; 7	RBR; 1; 9	RBR; 2; 5	RBR; 3; 6	NOR; 1; 5	NOR; 2; 4	NOR; 3; 7	NÜR; 1; 10	NÜR; 2 Ret	NÜR; 3; 10	SIL; 1; 9	SIL; 2; 9	SIL; 3; 6	VAL; 1; 9	VAL; 2; 9	VAL; 3; 11	HOC; 1; 9	HOC; 2; 8	HOC; 3; 7	9th	93

=== Complete GP3 Series results ===
(key) (Races in bold indicate pole position) (Races in italics indicate fastest lap)

Year	Entrant	1	2	3	4	5	6	7	8	9	10	11	12	13	14	15	16	17	18	D.C.	Points
2013	Status Grand Prix	CAT; FEA; 19	CAT; SPR; Ret	VAL; FEA; 18	VAL; SPR; 16	SIL; FEA; 18	SIL; SPR; 21†	NÜR; FEA; Ret	NÜR; SPR; 18	HUN; FEA; 13	HUN; SPR; 12	SPA; FEA; 17	SPA; SPR; 15	MNZ; FEA; 13	MNZ; SPR; Ret	YMC; FEA; 23	YMC; SPR; 26			24th	0
2014	Koiranen GP	CAT; FEA; 2	CAT; SPR; 6	RBR; FEA; 3	RBR; SPR; 2	**SIL**; **FEA**; 1	SIL; SPR; Ret	HOC; FEA; 7	HOC; SPR; 15	HUN; FEA; 10	HUN; SPR; 16	SPA; FEA; Ret	SPA; SPR; 19	**MNZ**; **FEA**; 1	MNZ; SPR; 8	SOC; FEA; 4	SOC; SPR; 16	YMC; FEA; 10	YMC; SPR; 5	4th	134
2015	Koiranen GP	CAT; FEA; 6	CAT; SPR; 2	RBR; FEA; 20†	RBR; SPR; 10	SIL; FEA; 5	SIL; SPR; 4	HUN; FEA; 6	HUN; SPR; 6	SPA; FEA; 13	SPA; SPR; 16	MNZ; FEA; 5	MNZ; SPR; 5	SOC; FEA; 8	SOC; SPR; 1	BHR; FEA; 5	BHR; SPR; 7	YMC; FEA; 3	YMC; SPR; 5	5th	118

^{†} Driver did not finish, but was classified as he completed 90% of the race distance.

=== Complete European Le Mans Series results ===
Year	Entrant	Class	Chassis	Engine	1	2	3	4	5	Rank	Points
2014	Sébastien Loeb Racing	LMP2	Oreca 03	Nissan VK45DE 4.5 L V8	SIL	IMO	RBR	LEC	EST; 1	10th	25

=== Complete GP2 Series results ===
(key) (Races in bold indicate pole position) (Races in italics indicate fastest lap)

Year	Entrant	1	2	3	4	5	6	7	8	9	10	11	12	13	14	15	16	17	18	19	20	21	22	DC	Points
2016	Arden International	CAT; FEA; 16	CAT; SPR; 19	MON; FEA; Ret	MON; SPR; 15	BAK; FEA; 11†	BAK; SPR; Ret	RBR; FEA; 5	RBR; SPR; 13	SIL; FEA; 15	SIL; SPR; 17	HUN; FEA; 21†	HUN; SPR; Ret	HOC; FEA; 12	HOC; SPR; 13	SPA; FEA; 15	SPA; SPR; 20	MNZ; FEA; 15	MNZ; SPR; 18†	SEP; FEA	SEP; SPR	YMC; FEA	YMC; SPR	20th	10

^{†} Driver did not finish, but was classified as he completed 90% of the race distance.

=== Complete Blancpain GT Series results ===
==== Blancpain GT Series Endurance Cup ====
(key) (Races in bold indicate pole position; races in italics indicate fastest lap)

Year	Team	Car	Class	1	2	3	4	5	6	7	Pos.	Points
2017	Mercedes-AMG Team HTP Motorsport	Mercedes-AMG GT3	Pro	MNZ; 3	SIL; 2	LEC; 40	SPA; 6H; 3	SPA; 12H; 52	SPA; 24H; Ret	CAT; 4	3rd	52

==== Blancpain GT Series Sprint Cup ====
(key) (Races in bold indicate pole position; races in italics indicate fastest lap)

Year	Team	Car	Class	1	2	3	4	5	6	7	8	9	10	Pos.	Points
2017	HTP Motorsport	Mercedes-AMG GT3	Pro	MIS; QR; 20	MIS; CR; 3	BRH; QR; 17	BRH; CR; 22	ZOL; QR; 8	ZOL; CR; 29	HUN; QR; 11	HUN; CR; 7	NÜR; QR; 23	NÜR; CR; 17	14th	21

=== Complete Scandinavian Touring Car Championship results ===
(key) (Races in bold indicate pole position) (Races in italics indicate fastest lap)

Year	Team	Car	1	2	3	4	5	6	7	8	9	10	DC	Points
2024	Brink Motorsport	Tesla Model 3 ETCR	GBG; 1; 1	**GBG**; **2**; 2	LJU; 1; 9	LJU; 2 Ret	**KNU**; **1**; 1	KNU; 2; 2	KNU; 3 Ret	KNU; 4; 1	MAN; 1; 3	**MAN**; **2**; 1	2nd	185

Sporting positions
Preceded by Richie Stanaway	German Formula Three Champion; 2012	Succeeded by Marvin Kirchhöfer
