= 2025 Formula Nordic =

Motor racing championship held in 2025

The 2025 Formula Nordic season was the thirteenth season of the Swedish-based single-seater championship and the seventh under the Formula Nordic name. For the first time, the series consisted of two championships: the regular JSM championship, and the new Nordic Championship, which was combined with Nordic 4. The change was made so that drivers could 'race a regional championship on a relatively low budget', according to series promoter Alex Stubberup Frederichsen.

The series used the Formula Renault 1.6 car, with Yokohama as the series' tyre supplier. The season began on 9 May at Anderstorp Raceway and concluded on 28 September at Jyllands-Ringen.

== Drivers and teams ==
Team	No.	Drivers	Rounds
Privateer	17	(Sweden) Olivia Ernstson	All
Privateer	18	(Sweden) Joannis Matentzoglou	1, 4–7
Privateer	51	(Sweden) Louise Larsson	1–5, 7
Privateer	61	(Sweden) Robin Hafström	1–5, 7
Privateer	72	(Sweden) Richard Olson	1–5, 7
Privateer	90	(Sweden) Hampus Varis	All
Race Team Gelleråsen	22	(Sweden) Melvin Kalousdian	All
Aichhorn Racing	87	(Sweden) Andreas Aichhorn	1–4
Project F1	88	(Sweden) Viktor Molander	1–5, 7

== Calendar ==
The season will be held over seven rounds, four in Sweden and three in Denmark. Six will form the JSM Championship and six will be part of the Nordic Championship combined with Nordic 4.

Rnd.		Circuit/Location	Championship	Date	Supporting
1	R1	(Sweden) Anderstorp Raceway, Gislaved	JSM; Nordic	9–10 May	Nordic 4 Porsche Carrera Cup Scandinavia
1	R2	(Sweden) Anderstorp Raceway, Gislaved	JSM; Nordic	9–10 May	Nordic 4 Porsche Carrera Cup Scandinavia
1	R3	(Sweden) Anderstorp Raceway, Gislaved	JSM; Nordic	9–10 May	Nordic 4 Porsche Carrera Cup Scandinavia
2	R1	(Sweden) Karlskoga Motorstadion, Karlskoga	JSM; Nordic	30 May–1 June	Porsche Carrera Cup Scandinavia
2	R2	(Sweden) Karlskoga Motorstadion, Karlskoga	JSM; Nordic	30 May–1 June	Porsche Carrera Cup Scandinavia
2	R3	(Sweden) Karlskoga Motorstadion, Karlskoga	JSM; Nordic	30 May–1 June	Porsche Carrera Cup Scandinavia
3	R1	(Sweden) Ljungbyheds Motorbana, Ljungbyhed	JSM	27–28 June	Radical Cup Scandinavia
3	R2	(Sweden) Ljungbyheds Motorbana, Ljungbyhed	JSM	27–28 June	Radical Cup Scandinavia
4	R1	(Sweden) Falkenbergs Motorbana, Falkenberg	JSM; Nordic	11–13 July	
4	R2	(Sweden) Falkenbergs Motorbana, Falkenberg	JSM; Nordic	11–13 July	
4	R3	(Sweden) Falkenbergs Motorbana, Falkenberg	JSM; Nordic	11–13 July	
5	R1	(Denmark) Jyllands-Ringen, Silkeborg	JSM; Nordic	22–24 August	Nordic 4 TCR Denmark; Super GT Denmark
5	R2	(Denmark) Jyllands-Ringen, Silkeborg	JSM; Nordic	22–24 August	Nordic 4 TCR Denmark; Super GT Denmark
5	R3	(Denmark) Jyllands-Ringen, Silkeborg	JSM; Nordic	22–24 August	Nordic 4 TCR Denmark; Super GT Denmark
6	R1	(Denmark) Padborg Park, Padborg	Nordic	12–13 September	Nordic 4 TCR Denmark; Super GT Denmark
6	R2	(Denmark) Padborg Park, Padborg	Nordic	12–13 September	Nordic 4 TCR Denmark; Super GT Denmark
6	R3	(Denmark) Padborg Park, Padborg	Nordic	12–13 September	Nordic 4 TCR Denmark; Super GT Denmark
7	R1	(Denmark) Jyllands-Ringen, Silkeborg	JSM; Nordic	27–28 September	Nordic 4
7	R2	(Denmark) Jyllands-Ringen, Silkeborg	JSM; Nordic	27–28 September	Nordic 4
7	R3	(Denmark) Jyllands-Ringen, Silkeborg	JSM; Nordic	27–28 September	Nordic 4

== Race results ==
Rnd.		Circuit	Pole position	Fastest lap	Winning driver
1	R1	(Sweden) Anderstorp Raceway	(Sweden) Melvin Kalousdian	(Sweden) Robin Hafström	(Sweden) Melvin Kalousdian
1	R2	(Sweden) Anderstorp Raceway		(Sweden) Richard Olson	(Sweden) Melvin Kalousdian
1	R3	(Sweden) Anderstorp Raceway		(Sweden) Melvin Kalousdian	(Sweden) Melvin Kalousdian
2	R1	(Sweden) Karlskoga Motorstadion	(Sweden) Richard Olson	(Sweden) Melvin Kalousdian	(Sweden) Richard Olson
2	R2	(Sweden) Karlskoga Motorstadion		(Sweden) Robin Hafström	(Sweden) Melvin Kalousdian
2	R3	(Sweden) Karlskoga Motorstadion		(Sweden) Hampus Varis	(Sweden) Richard Olson
3	R1	(Sweden) Ljungbyheds Motorbana	(Sweden) Richard Olson	(Sweden) Louise Larsson	(Sweden) Richard Olson
3	R2	(Sweden) Ljungbyheds Motorbana		(Sweden) Melvin Kalousdian	(Sweden) Melvin Kalousdian
4	R1	(Sweden) Falkenbergs Motorbana	(Sweden) Hampus Varis	(Sweden) Richard Olson	(Sweden) Melvin Kalousdian
4	R2	(Sweden) Falkenbergs Motorbana		(Sweden) Richard Olson	(Sweden) Melvin Kalousdian
4	R3	(Sweden) Falkenbergs Motorbana		(Sweden) Hampus Varis	(Sweden) Melvin Kalousdian
5	R1	(Denmark) Jyllands-Ringen	(Sweden) Melvin Kalousdian	(Sweden) Melvin Kalousdian	(Sweden) Melvin Kalousdian
5	R2	(Denmark) Jyllands-Ringen		(Sweden) Hampus Varis	(Sweden) Robin Hafström
5	R3	(Denmark) Jyllands-Ringen		(Sweden) Hampus Varis	(Sweden) Melvin Kalousdian
6	R1	(Denmark) Padborg Park	(Sweden) Melvin Kalousdian	(Sweden) Hampus Varis	(Sweden) Hampus Varis
6	R2	(Denmark) Padborg Park		(Sweden) Melvin Kalousdian	(Sweden) Melvin Kalousdian
6	R3	(Denmark) Padborg Park		(Sweden) Melvin Kalousdian	(Sweden) Melvin Kalousdian
7	R1	(Denmark) Jyllands-Ringen	(Sweden) Hampus Varis	(Sweden) Hampus Varis	(Sweden) Melvin Kalousdian
7	R2	(Denmark) Jyllands-Ringen		(Sweden) Hampus Varis	(Sweden) Melvin Kalousdian
7	R3	(Denmark) Jyllands-Ringen		(Sweden) Hampus Varis	(Sweden) Melvin Kalousdian

== Championship standings ==
Qualifying points system

Points are awarded to the top 5 fastest qualifying times.

Position	**1st**	**2nd**	**3rd**	**4th**	**5th**
Points	5	4	3	2	1

Race points system

Points are awarded to the top 10 classified finishers; no points are offered for fastest lap. The worst result for each driver is dropped from the final standings.

Position	**1st**	**2nd**	**3rd**	**4th**	**5th**	**6th**	**7th**	**8th**	**9th**	**10th**
Points	25	18	15	12	10	8	6	4	2	1

=== FSM Championship ===
Pos.	Driver	AND (Sweden)			KAR (Sweden)			LJU (Sweden)		FAL (Sweden)			JYL1 (Denmark)			JYL2 (Denmark)			Pts.
Pos.	Driver	R1	R2	R3	R1	R2	R3	R1	R2	R1	R2	R3	R1	R2	R3	R1	R2	R3	Pts.
1	(Sweden) Melvin Kalousdian	**1**^{1}	1	1	2^{3}	1	(Ret)	8†^{2}	1	1^{2}	1	1	**1**^{1}	Ret	1	1^{3}	1	1	371
2	(Sweden) Richard Olson	(3)^{2}	2	2	**1**^{1}	2	1	**1**^{1}	3	2	2	3	2^{4}	3	3^{2}	3	7	DNS	284
3	(Sweden) Robin Hafström	2^{3}	3	(4)	3^{5}	3	3	3^{4}	4	3^{3}	3	4	3^{3}	1	2	4^{4}	3	4	258
4	(Sweden) Hampus Varis	4^{4}	4	3	6^{2}	(Ret)	2	2^{3}	Ret	**4^{1}**	4	2	5^{2}	5	4	**2^{1}**	2	2	234
5	(Sweden) Viktor Molander	9	7	7	4	4	4	6	7	6	5	(Ret)	8	DNS	8	7	6	3	119
6	(Sweden) Louise Larsson	8	5	5	(DNS)	DNS	DNS	7†	5	5^{5}	6	6	4^{5}	2	5	6	Ret	Ret	116
7	(Sweden) Olivia Ernstsson	7	8	8	(Ret)	5	5	5	6	8	8	Ret	7	6	7	Ret^{5}	5	Ret	91
8	(Greece) Joannis Matentzoglou	6	6	(Ret)	DNS	DNS	DNS			7	7	5	6	4	6	5	4	Ret	88
9	(Sweden) Andreas Aichhorn	5^{5}	9	6	5^{4}	(DNS)	DNS	4^{5}	2	Ret^{4}	DNS	DNS							66

Colour	Result
Gold	Winner
Silver	Second place
Bronze	Third place
Green	Points classification
Blue	Non-points classification
Blue	Non-classified finish (NC)
Purple	Retired, not classified (Ret)
Red	Did not qualify (DNQ)
Red	Did not pre-qualify (DNPQ)
Black	Disqualified (DSQ)
White	Did not start (DNS)
White	Withdrew (WD)
White	Race cancelled (C)
Blank	Did not practice (DNP)
Blank	Did not arrive (DNA)
Blank	Excluded (EX)

**Bold** – Pole
Italics – Fastest Lap
Superscript – Points-scoring qualifying position
(Brackets) – Dropped points
