= 2025 Nordic 4 Championship =

Danish motor racing series

The 2025 Nordic 4 Championship season was the ninth season of the F4 Danish Championship and the second under the Nordic 4 name. For the first time, the series consisted of two championships, a Danish Championship and a Nordic Championship, the latter of which was combined with Formula Nordic. The change was made so that drivers could 'race a regional championship on a relatively low budget', according to series promoter Alex Stubberup Frederichsen.

The season began at Padborg Park in April and concluded at Jyllandsringen in September. The Formula 4 category continued to use the Mygale M14-F4 car, while the Formula 5 category used Formula Ford cars, also from Mygale.

== Teams and drivers ==
Formula 4 entries
Team	No.	Driver	Class	Rounds
(Denmark) STEP Motorsport	1	(Denmark) Casper Nissen	R	All
(Denmark) STEP Motorsport	7	(Denmark) Victor Snebjørn Poulsen	R	All
(Denmark) STEP Motorsport	10	(Sweden) Milla Sjöstrand	R	7
(Denmark) STEP Motorsport	65	(Greece) George Sebastian Pavlopoulos	R	1–6
(Denmark) STEP Motorsport	88	(Denmark) Sebastian Bach		All
(Denmark) RaceCraft Driver Academy	11	(Denmark) Nikolaj Dyrved	R	1
(Denmark) RaceCraft Driver Academy	11	(Denmark) Carl Pramming		6–7
(Denmark) RaceCraft Driver Academy	22	(Denmark) Cecilie Nør-Jensen	R	1–7
(Denmark) MP Racing	12	(Denmark) Magnus Pedersen		1–4, 6–8
(Denmark) FSP	15	(Denmark) Marius Kristiansen		All
(Denmark) FSP	61	(Sweden) Alexia Danielsson		1, 3–8
(Denmark) SE Racing	21	(Denmark) Silas Egedal	R	6–8
Formula 5 entries
(Denmark) Leerskov Racing	4	(Denmark) Jørgen Leerskov		1–4, 6–8
(Denmark) Mads Hoe Motorsport	16	(Denmark) Mads Kjelde Larsen		1–2, 4–5
(Denmark) Mads Hoe Motorsport	47	(Denmark) Mads Hoe		All
(Denmark) Mads Hoe Motorsport	53	(Denmark) Anton Morsing	R	All
(Denmark) Mads Hoe Motorsport	56	(Denmark) Mille Hoe		All
(Denmark) Sønderskov Motorsport	39	(Denmark) Line Sønderskov		6
(Denmark) Rytteriet	49	(Denmark) Niels Ejnar Rytter		1–4, 6–8

== Calendar ==
The Nordic 4 championship consists of eight rounds overall, five in Denmark and three in Sweden. Six of these rounds contribute to the Danish Championship, while six are part of the combined Nordic Championship with Formula Nordic.

Rnd.		Circuit/Location	Championship	Date	Supporting
1	R1	(Denmark) Padborg Park, Padborg	Danish	26–27 April	TCR Denmark; Super GT Denmark
1	R2	(Denmark) Padborg Park, Padborg	Danish	26–27 April	TCR Denmark; Super GT Denmark
1	R3	(Denmark) Padborg Park, Padborg	Danish	26–27 April	TCR Denmark; Super GT Denmark
2	R1	(Sweden) Anderstorp Raceway, Gislaved	Danish; Nordic	9–10 May	Formula Nordic; Porsche Carrera Cup Scandinavia
2	R2	(Sweden) Anderstorp Raceway, Gislaved	Danish; Nordic	9–10 May	Formula Nordic; Porsche Carrera Cup Scandinavia
2	R3	(Sweden) Anderstorp Raceway, Gislaved	Danish; Nordic	9–10 May	Formula Nordic; Porsche Carrera Cup Scandinavia
3	R1	(Sweden) Karlskoga Motorstadion, Karlskoga	Nordic	30 May–1 June	Formula Nordic
3	R2	(Sweden) Karlskoga Motorstadion, Karlskoga	Nordic	30 May–1 June	Formula Nordic
3	R3	(Sweden) Karlskoga Motorstadion, Karlskoga	Nordic	30 May–1 June	Formula Nordic
4	R1	(Denmark) Ring Djursland, Pederstrup	Danish	21–22 June	TCR Denmark; Super GT Denmark
4	R2	(Denmark) Ring Djursland, Pederstrup	Danish	21–22 June	TCR Denmark; Super GT Denmark
4	R3	(Denmark) Ring Djursland, Pederstrup	Danish	21–22 June	TCR Denmark; Super GT Denmark
5	R1	(Sweden) Falkenbergs Motorbana, Falkenberg	Nordic	11–13 July	Formula Nordic
5	R2	(Sweden) Falkenbergs Motorbana, Falkenberg	Nordic	11–13 July	Formula Nordic
5	R3	(Sweden) Falkenbergs Motorbana, Falkenberg	Nordic	11–13 July	Formula Nordic
6	R1	(Denmark) Jyllands-Ringen, Silkeborg	Danish; Nordic	22–24 August	Formula Nordic; TCR Denmark; Super GT Denmark
6	R2	(Denmark) Jyllands-Ringen, Silkeborg	Danish; Nordic	22–24 August	Formula Nordic; TCR Denmark; Super GT Denmark
6	R3	(Denmark) Jyllands-Ringen, Silkeborg	Danish; Nordic	22–24 August	Formula Nordic; TCR Denmark; Super GT Denmark
7	R1	(Denmark) Padborg Park, Padborg	Danish; Nordic	12–13 September	TCR Denmark; Super GT Denmark
7	R2	(Denmark) Padborg Park, Padborg	Danish; Nordic	12–13 September	TCR Denmark; Super GT Denmark
7	R3	(Denmark) Padborg Park, Padborg	Danish; Nordic	12–13 September	TCR Denmark; Super GT Denmark
8	R1	(Denmark) Jyllands-Ringen, Silkeborg	Danish; Nordic	27–28 September	Formula Nordic
8	R2	(Denmark) Jyllands-Ringen, Silkeborg	Danish; Nordic	27–28 September	Formula Nordic
8	R3	(Denmark) Jyllands-Ringen, Silkeborg	Danish; Nordic	27–28 September	Formula Nordic

== Race results ==
Rnd.		Circuit	Overall			Formula 5
Rnd.		Circuit	Pole position	Fastest lap	Winning driver	Winning driver
1	R1	(Denmark) Padborg Park	(Denmark) Sebastian Bach	(Denmark) Marius Kristiansen	(Denmark) Sebastian Bach	(Denmark) Anton Morsing
1	R2	(Denmark) Padborg Park		(Denmark) Marius Kristiansen	(Denmark) Magnus Pedersen	(Denmark) Mads Kjelde Larsen
1	R3	(Denmark) Padborg Park		(Denmark) Mads Hoe	(Denmark) Marius Kristiansen	(Denmark) Mads Kjelde Larsen
2	R1	(Sweden) Anderstorp Raceway	(Denmark) Mads Hoe	(Denmark) Mads Hoe	(Denmark) Mads Hoe	(Denmark) Mads Hoe
2	R2	(Sweden) Anderstorp Raceway		(Denmark) Marius Kristiansen	(Denmark) Mads Hoe	(Denmark) Mads Hoe
2	R3	(Sweden) Anderstorp Raceway		(Denmark) Mads Hoe	(Denmark) Mads Hoe	(Denmark) Mads Hoe
3	R1	(Sweden) Karlskoga Motorstadion	(Denmark) Sebastian Bach	(Denmark) Marius Kristiansen	(Denmark) Sebastian Bach	(Denmark) Anton Morsing
3	R2	(Sweden) Karlskoga Motorstadion		(Denmark) Sebastian Bach	(Sweden) Alexia Danielsson	(Denmark) Mads Hoe
3	R3	(Sweden) Karlskoga Motorstadion		(Denmark) Victor Snejbørn Poulsen	(Denmark) Marius Kristiansen	(Denmark) Anton Morsing
4	R1	(Denmark) Ring Djursland	(Denmark) Sebastian Bach	(Denmark) Mads Hoe	(Denmark) Mads Hoe	(Denmark) Mads Hoe
4	R2	(Denmark) Ring Djursland		(Denmark) Sebastian Bach	(Denmark) Marius Kristiansen	(Denmark) Mads Hoe
4	R3	(Denmark) Ring Djursland		(Denmark) Marius Kristiansen	(Denmark) Mads Hoe	(Denmark) Mads Hoe
5	R1	(Sweden) Falkenbergs Motorbana	(Denmark) Sebastian Bach	(Denmark) Sebastian Bach	(Denmark) Sebastian Bach	(Denmark) Mads Hoe
5	R2	(Sweden) Falkenbergs Motorbana		(Denmark) Sebastian Bach	(Denmark) Sebastian Bach	(Denmark) Anton Morsing
5	R3	(Sweden) Falkenbergs Motorbana		(Denmark) Marius Kristiansen	(Denmark) Sebastian Bach	(Denmark) Anton Morsing
6	R1	(Denmark) Jyllands-Ringen	(Denmark) Marius Kristiansen	(Denmark) Marius Kristiansen	(Denmark) Marius Kristiansen	(Denmark) Mads Hoe
6	R2	(Denmark) Jyllands-Ringen		(Denmark) Marius Kristiansen	(Denmark) Victor Snebjørn Poulsen	(Denmark) Anton Morsing
6	R3	(Denmark) Jyllands-Ringen		(Denmark) Marius Kristiansen	(Denmark) Magnus Pedersen	(Denmark) Mads Hoe
7	R1	(Denmark) Padborg Park	(Denmark) Sebastian Bach	(Denmark) Sebastian Bach	(Denmark) Casper Nissen	(Denmark) Anton Morsing
7	R2	(Denmark) Padborg Park		(Denmark) Marius Kristiansen	(Denmark) Marius Kristiansen	(Denmark) Mads Hoe
7	R3	(Denmark) Padborg Park		(Denmark) Magnus Pedersen	(Denmark) Marius Kristiansen	(Denmark) Mads Hoe
8	R1	(Denmark) Jyllands-Ringen	(Denmark) Marius Kristiansen	(Denmark) Sebastian Bach	(Denmark) Sebastian Bach	(Denmark) Mads Hoe
8	R2	(Denmark) Jyllands-Ringen		(Denmark) Marius Kristiansen	(Denmark) Silas Egedal	(Denmark) Mads Hoe
8	R3	(Denmark) Jyllands-Ringen		(Denmark) Victor Snebjørn Poulsen	(Denmark) Magnus Pedersen	(Denmark) Mads Hoe

== Championship standings ==
Points are awarded to the top 10 classified finishers in each race. No points are awarded for pole position or fastest lap.

Position	**1st**	**2nd**	**3rd**	**4th**	**5th**	**6th**	**7th**	**8th**	**9th**	**10th**
Points	25	18	15	12	10	8	6	4	2	1

=== Danish Championship ===
Pos.	Driver	PAD1 (Denmark)			AND (Sweden)			DJU (Denmark)			JYL1 (Denmark)			PAD2 (Denmark)			JYL2 (Denmark)			Pts.
Pos.	Driver	R1	R2	R3	R1	R2	R3	R1	R2	R3	R1	R2	R3	R1	R2	R3	R1	R2	R3	Pts.
1	(Denmark) Marius Kristiansen	2	2	1	2	6	6	3	1	2	**1**	Ret	3	2	1	1	**DSQ**	3	4	288
2	(Denmark) Sebastian Bach	**1**	4	2	4	2	2	**2**	3	3	2	Ret	4	**4**	2	2	1	7	8	264
3	(Denmark) Mads Hoe **(F5)**	Ret	Ret	Ret	**1**	1	1	1	2	1	5	16	7	Ret	3	3	3	5	5	224
4	(Denmark) Casper Nissen **(R)**	4	3	5	7	3	7	4	9	5	4	2	2	1	4	Ret	4	2	2	221
5	(Denmark) Magnus Pedersen	3	1	3	3	19	5	13	6	DNS	3	4	1	15	8	7	2	4	1	205
6	(Denmark) Victor Snejbørn Poulsen **(R)**	Ret	7	4	5	4	3	5	11	8	6	1	5	5	7	5	10	13	Ret	139
7	(Denmark) Anton Morsing **(R)(F5)**	7	11	8	6	Ret	4	6	5	4	7	6	8	3	11	6	9	9	6	113
8	(Denmark) Silas Egedal **(R)**										8	3	6	6	6	4	6	1	3	103
9	(Sweden) Alexia Danielsson	6	6	6	WD	WD	WD	7	4	7	Ret	7	Ret	11	12	Ret	DNS	11	9	56
10	(Denmark) Mads Kjelde Larsen **(F5)**	Ret	5	7	10	5	8	8	7	6										49
11	(Greece) George Sebastian Pavlopoulos **(R)**	5	8	Ret	8	7	9	Ret	8	9	13	5	21							42
12	(Denmark) Mille Hoe **(F5)**	8	9	9	12	8	10	9	10	Ret	DNS	10	13	9	10	11	13	10	11	20
13	(Denmark) Carl Pramming										12	8	Ret	Ret	Ret	DNS				4
14	(Denmark) Jørgen Leerskov **(F5)**	9	10	Ret	Ret	DNS	16	11	13	11	18	13	15	12	17	14	15	16	12	3
15	(Denmark) Niels Ejnar Rytter **(F5)**	10	Ret	11				10	12	10	19	17	18	Ret	16	15	Ret	17	13	3
16	(Sweden) Milla Sjöstrand **(R)**													10	13	10				2
17	(Denmark) Nikolaj Dyrved **(R)**	11	12	10																1
18	(Denmark) Cecilie Nør-Jensen **(R)**	12	13	12	20	18	18	12	14	12	22	20	22	16	18	16				0
19	(Denmark) Line Sønderskov **(F5)**										21	19	19							0

Colour	Result
Gold	Winner
Silver	Second place
Bronze	Third place
Green	Points classification
Blue	Non-points classification
Blue	Non-classified finish (NC)
Purple	Retired, not classified (Ret)
Red	Did not qualify (DNQ)
Red	Did not pre-qualify (DNPQ)
Black	Disqualified (DSQ)
White	Did not start (DNS)
White	Withdrew (WD)
White	Race cancelled (C)
Blank	Did not practice (DNP)
Blank	Did not arrive (DNA)
Blank	Excluded (EX)

**Bold** – Pole
Italics – Fastest Lap
