= Vicky Farfus =

Brazilian and Italian racing driver (born 2011)

- Nationality: (Brazil) Brazilian
- Born: 12 June 2011 (age 15) Curitiba, Brazil
- Relatives: Augusto Farfus (father)

Previous series
- 2026: Ginetta Junior Championship

Victoria Johnsson Farfus dos Santos (born 12 June 2011) is a Brazilian and Italian racing driver who competes in the F4 Brazilian Championship for TMG Racing. She is the daughter of Augusto Farfus.

== Personal life ==
Farfus was born on 12 June 2011 in Curitiba, Brazil, but as of 2026 is based in Monaco. She is the daughter of BMW factory driver Augusto Farfus, and the older sister of Johnny Farfus, who is also a racing driver.

== Career ==
Farfus began karting in 2023, competing until 2025. After a podium at the 50 Milhas de Kart on her debut year, Farfus joined Iron Dames in early 2024 for her first full-season in junior karts. Following a quiet season mostly spent in OK-NJ, Farfus found more success in the category in 2025, finishing eighth in the Champions of the Future Academy Program standings and fourth in the Karting World Cup. During her karting career, Farfus was also part of F1 Academy's Discover Your Drive initiative.

In 2026, Farfus stepped up to car racing by entering the Ginetta Junior Championship with Paradine Competition. After taking a best result of 11th at Snetterton in the first six rounds, Farfus switched to R Racing for the penultimate of the season at Donington Park, where she took a season-best result of tenth in race three. During 2026, Farfus also began testing Formula 4 machinery with Cram Motorsport, before participating in F1 Academy's rookie test at Navarra in September, in which she set the overall fastest time. After ending her rookie campaign in the Ginetta Junior Championship, Farfus resumed her F4 testing programme, now with Prema Racing, as she joined them for her single-seater debut at the final round of the E4 Championship at Monza, in which she scored overall points by finishing 13th in race two. Following that, Farfus made cameo appearances in the Formula 4 CEZ Championship for Cram Motorsport, as well as the F4 Brazilian Championship for TMG Racing.

== Karting record ==
=== Karting career summary ===
Season	Series	Team	Position
2023	Trofeo D'Autunno — Mini Gr.3	Scarpi Racing	17th
2023	Rok Cup Superfinal — Mini Rok		61st
2023	Champions of the Future Academy Program — Mini Gr.3		22nd
2024	WSK Super Master Series — OK-NJ	AKM Motorsport	50th
2024	Champions of the Future Academy Program — OK-NJ		29th
2024	IAME Euro Series — X30 Junior	ASD Autoeuropeo Motorsport	38th
2024	WSK Euro Series — OK-NJ	Kidix Driver Performance	23rd
2024	WSK Super Cup — OK-NJ	KR Motorsport	19th
2024	WSK Final Cup — OK-NJ	Kidix Driver Performance	35th
2025	WSK Super Master Series — OK-NJ	Prema Racing; Kidix Driver Performance (Note: Farfus competed for Prema Racing in round 3 and for Kidix Driver Performance in round 4.)	33rd
2025	Champions of the Future Academy Program — OK-NJ		8th
2025	Champions of the Future Euro Series — OK-J	Prema Racing; VictoryLane (Note: Farfus competed for Prema Racing in round 2 and for VictoryLane in round 3.)	131st
2025	WSK Euro Series — OK-NJ	Kidix Driver Performance	41st
2025	Karting World Cup — OK-NJ	Prema Racing	4th
2025	Rok Cup Superfinal — Junior Rok	Kidix Driver Performance	18th
2025	WSK Final Cup — OK-NJ	Kidix Driver Performance	34th

== Racing record ==
=== Racing career summary ===
Season	Series	Team	Races	Wins	Poles	F/Laps	Podiums	Points	Position
2026	Ginetta Junior Championship	Paradine Competition	19	0	0	0	0	60	23rd
2026	Ginetta Junior Championship	R Racing	3	0	0	0	0	60	23rd
2026	E4 Championship	Prema Racing	3	0	0	0	0	4	35th
2026	Formula 4 CEZ Championship	Cram Motorsport	3	0	0	0	0	21	29th
2026	F4 Brazilian Championship	TMG Racing	3	0	0	1	2	*	*

=== Complete Ginetta Junior Championship results ===
(key) (Races in bold indicate pole position; races in italics indicate fastest lap)

Year	Entrant	1	2	3	4	5	6	7	8	9	10	11	12	13	14	15	16	17	18	19	20	21	22	23	24	25	Pos	Points
2026	Paradine Competition	DON1; 1; 17	DON1; 2; 18	DON1; 3 Ret	SIL; 1; 16	SIL; 2; 21	SIL; 3; 22	OUL; 1; 22	OUL; 2; 17	OUL; 3 Ret	CRO; 1; 17	CRO; 2; 20	CRO; 3; 24	CRO; 4; 17	ZAN; 1; 12	ZAN; 2 Ret	ZAN; 3 Ret	SNE; 1; 11	SNE; 2; 18	SNE; 3; 18							23rd	60
2026	R Racing																				DON2; 1; 18	DON2; 2; 13	DON2; 3; 10	BRH; 1	BRH; 2	BRH; 3	23rd	60

=== Complete E4 Championship results ===
(key) (Races in bold indicate pole position; races in italics indicate fastest lap)

Year	Team	1	2	3	4	5	6	7	8	9	DC	Points
2026	Prema Racing	VLL; 1	VLL; 2	VLL; 3	LEC; 1	LEC; 2	LEC; 3	MNZ; 1; 17	MNZ; 2; 13	MNZ; 3 Ret	35th	4

=== Complete Formula 4 CEZ Championship results ===
(key) (Races in bold indicate pole position) (Races in italics indicate fastest lap)

Year	Team	1	2	3	4	5	6	7	8	9	10	11	12	13	14	15	16	17	18	19	20	21	22	23	24	DC	Points
2026	Cram Motorsport	RBR1; 1	RBR1; 2	RBR1; 3	RBR1; 4	SAL; 1	SAL; 2	SAL; 3	SAL; 4	SVK; 1	SVK; 2	SVK; 3	SVK; 4	MOS; 1	MOS; 2	MOS; 3	MOS; 4	BRN; 1	BRN; 2	BRN; 3	BRN; 4	HUN; 1; 8	HUN; 2; 6	HUN; 3	HUN; 4; 13	29th	21
