= 2024 STCC Scandinavia Touring Car Championship =

Motorsport season

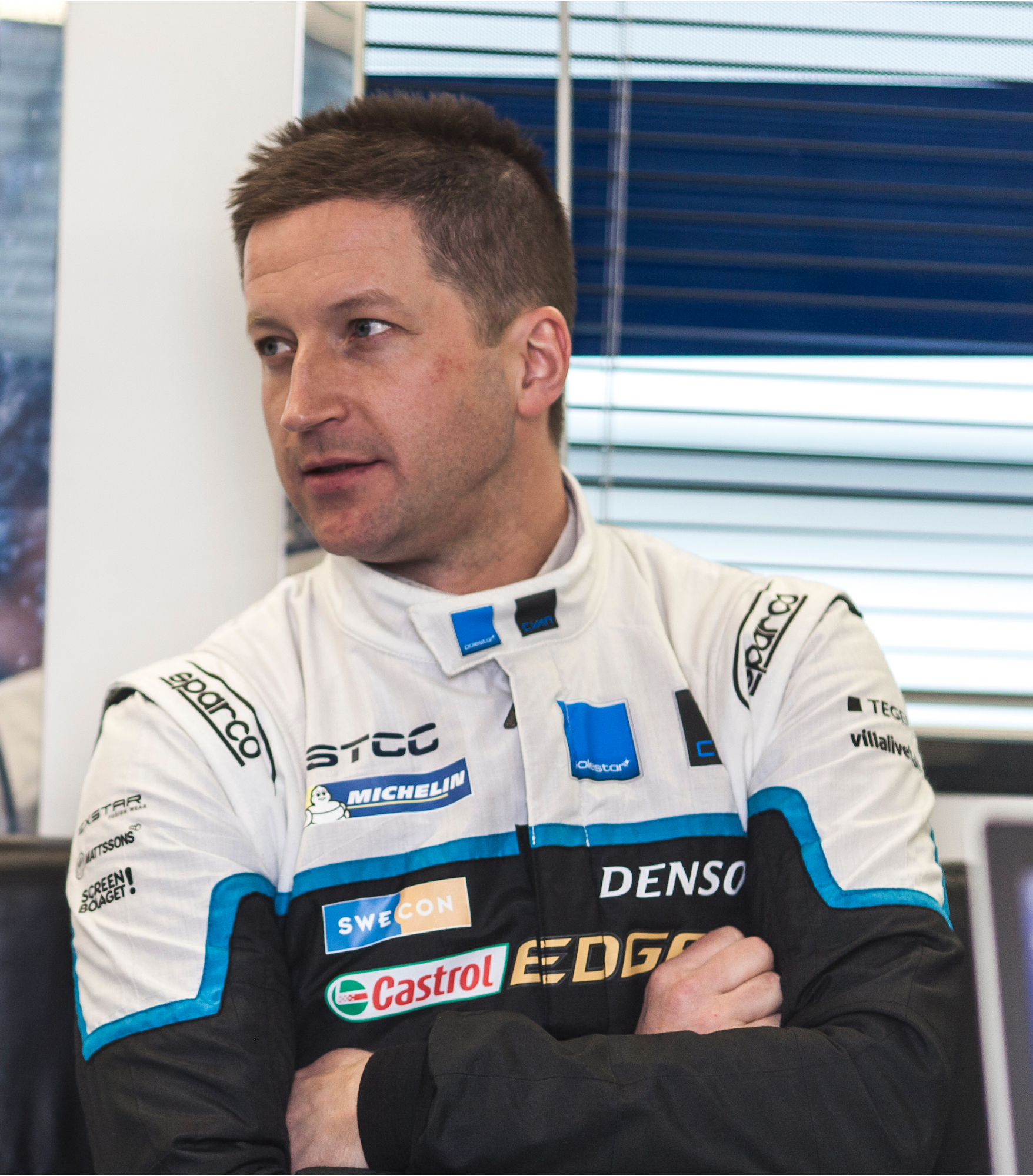
Robert Dahlgren is the reigning Drivers' Champion from 2022.

The 2024 STCC Scandinavia Touring Car Championship was the fourteenth season of the championship and the first season to feature new all-electric touring cars, built to specifications custom designed for the championship. The season began on June 8 in Gothenburg and concluded on September 21 at Mantorp Park. The championship organizing committee had opted to reschedule the electrified 2023 STCC season to 2024, in response to supplier shortages that hindered the production of all 12 required racing cars.

The reigning drivers' champion from the 2022 season was Robert Dahlgren, who drove a CUPRA Leon Competición TCR. His team, CUPRA Dealer Team - PWR Racing, also won the team title. Axel Bengtsson, also driving a CUPRA Leon Competición TCR, was the junior drivers' champion, while Marius Solberg Hansen, in a Volkswagen Golf GTI TCR, won the Däckteam trophy.

The Scandinavian Touring Car Championship organisers have claimed the competition as the world's first all-electric national championship.

== Teams and drivers ==
Entrant	Car	Race drivers		
Entrant	Car	No.	Driver name	Rounds
(Sweden) CUPRA Dealer Team – PWR Racing	Cupra Born e-Racer	2	(Sweden) Robert Dahlgren	All
(Sweden) CUPRA Dealer Team – PWR Racing	Cupra Born e-Racer	55	(Sweden) Axel Bengtsson	All
(Sweden) CUPRA Dealer Team – PWR Racing	Cupra Born e-Racer	92	(Sweden) Anton Marklund	All
(Sweden) Brink Motorsport	Tesla Model 3 ETCR	14	(Sweden) Jimmy Eriksson	All
(Sweden) Brink Motorsport	Tesla Model 3 ETCR	48	(Sweden) Mikael Karlsson	All
(Sweden) Brink Motorsport	Tesla Model 3 ETCR	71	(Sweden) Tobias Brink	All
(Sweden) Exion Racing	BMW i4 ETCR	6	(Sweden) Mikael Bern	3–10
(Sweden) Exion Racing	BMW i4 ETCR	7	(Sweden) Jonathan Engström	3–4
(Sweden) Exion Racing	BMW i4 ETCR	16	(Sweden) Calle Bergman	1–2, 5–10
(Sweden) Exion Racing	BMW i4 ETCR	27	(Sweden) Månz Thalin	All
(Sweden) Exion Racing	BMW i4 ETCR	74	(Sweden) Lukas Sundahl	1–2
(Sweden) Exion Racing	Volkswagen ID.3 ETCR	19	(Sweden) Viktor Gustavsson	1–2, 5–10
(Sweden) Exion Racing	Volkswagen ID.3 ETCR	20	(Sweden) Ola Nilsson	1–2
(Sweden) Exion Racing	Volkswagen ID.3 ETCR	24	(Sweden) Linus Ohlsson	3–4
(Sweden) Exion Racing	Volkswagen ID.3 ETCR	77	(Sweden) Alexander Graff	All

== Race calendar ==
The provisional calendar was published on 29 November 2023, in which contains three city circuit races on two venues with Head 2 Head format, and three circuit races with more traditional format.

Round	Circuit	Location	Date	Pole position	Fastest lap	Race winner	Winning team
1	(Sweden) Ullevi	Gothenburg, Västra Götaland	8 June	(Sweden) Ola Nilsson		(Sweden) Jimmy Eriksson	(Sweden) Brink Motorsport
2	(Sweden) Ullevi	Gothenburg, Västra Götaland	9 June	(Sweden) Jimmy Eriksson		(Sweden) Robert Dahlgren	(Sweden) Cupra Dealer Team – PWR Racing
3	(Sweden) Ljungbyheds Motorbana	Ljungbyhed, Skåne	28 June	(Sweden) Tobias Brink	(Sweden) Mikael Karlsson	(Sweden) Tobias Brink	(Sweden) Brink Motorsport
4	(Sweden) Ljungbyheds Motorbana	Ljungbyhed, Skåne	29 June	(Sweden) Tobias Brink	(Sweden) Mikael Karlsson	(Sweden) Tobias Brink	(Sweden) Brink Motorsport
5	(Sweden) Ring Knutstorp	Kågeröd, Skåne	13 September	(Sweden) Jimmy Eriksson	(Sweden) Jimmy Eriksson	(Sweden) Jimmy Eriksson	(Sweden) Brink Motorsport
6	(Sweden) Ring Knutstorp	Kågeröd, Skåne	13 September	(Sweden) Tobias Brink	(Sweden) Tobias Brink	(Sweden) Tobias Brink	(Sweden) Brink Motorsport
7	(Sweden) Ring Knutstorp	Kågeröd, Skåne	14 September	(Sweden) Mikael Karlsson	(Sweden) Mikael Karlsson	(Sweden) Mikael Karlsson	(Sweden) Brink Motorsport
8	(Sweden) Ring Knutstorp	Kågeröd, Skåne	14 September	(Sweden) Mikael Karlsson	(Sweden) Tobias Brink	(Sweden) Jimmy Eriksson	(Sweden) Brink Motorsport
9	(Sweden) Mantorp Park	Mantorp, Östergötland	21 September	(Sweden) Tobias Brink	(Sweden) Jimmy Eriksson	(Sweden) Mikael Karlsson	(Sweden) Brink Motorsport
10	(Sweden) Mantorp Park	Mantorp, Östergötland	21 September	(Sweden) Jimmy Eriksson	(Sweden) Jimmy Eriksson	(Sweden) Jimmy Eriksson	(Sweden) Brink Motorsport

== Championship standings ==
This year's scoring system, with points now being handed to the top 10 finishers.

Position	**1st**	**2nd**	**3rd**	**4th**	**5th**	**6th**	**7th**	**8th**	**9th**	**10th**
Qualifying	5	4	3	2	1	—N/a				
Race	25	18	15	12	10	8	6	4	2	1

=== Drivers' Championship ===
Pos.	Driver	GBG (Sweden)		LJU (Sweden)		KNU (Sweden)				MAN (Sweden)		Pts
Pos.	Driver	RD1	RD2	RD1	RD2	RD1	RD2	RD3	RD4	RD1	RD2	Pts
1	(Sweden) Mikael Karlsson	2^{4}	4^{3}	3	2^{3}	9	3^{3}	**1^{1}**	**2^{1}**	1^{2}	2^{5}	192
2	(Sweden) Jimmy Eriksson	1^{5}	**2^{1}**	9^{2}	Ret	**1^{1}**	2^{2}	Ret^{3}	1^{2}	3^{5}	**1^{1}**	185
3	(Sweden) Tobias Brink	6	5	**1^{1}**	**1^{1}**	8^{2}	**1^{1}**	2^{2}	3^{3}	**Ret^{1}**	7^{2}	171
4	(Sweden) Robert Dahlgren	4^{2}	1^{4}	2^{3}	6^{2}	3^{5}	6	6	6^{4}	4	3	145
5	(Sweden) Alexander Graff	11	Ret	7^{4}	5^{4}	2^{3}	4^{4}	4	4^{5}	6	6	96
6	(Sweden) Anton Marklund	5^{3}	8	8	4	11^{4}	7^{5}	3	8	8	5	75
7	(Sweden) Axel Bengtsson	8	10^{5}	4	8^{5}	10	10	8	10	2^{3}	Ret^{4}	53
8	(Sweden) Månz Thalin	12	Ret	6	7	6	9	5	5	7	Ret	50
9	(Sweden) Viktor Gustavsson	9	7			5	8	10	9	5	4^{3}	50
10	(Sweden) Ola Nilsson	**3^{1}**	3^{2}									39
11	(Sweden) Calle Bergman	7	6			4	Ret	7^{4}	Ret	10^{4}	Ret	37
12	(Sweden) Mikael Bern			Ret^{5}	Ret	7	5	9^{5}	7	9	8	32
13	(Sweden) Jonathan Engström			10	3							16
14	(Sweden) Linus Ohlsson			5	Ret							10
15	(Sweden) Lukas Sundahl	10	9									3

Colour	Result
Gold	Winner
Silver	Second place
Bronze	Third place
Green	Points classification
Blue	Non-points classification
Blue	Non-classified finish (NC)
Purple	Retired, not classified (Ret)
Red	Did not qualify (DNQ)
Red	Did not pre-qualify (DNPQ)
Black	Disqualified (DSQ)
White	Did not start (DNS)
White	Withdrew (WD)
White	Race cancelled (C)
Blank	Did not practice (DNP)
Blank	Did not arrive (DNA)
Blank	Excluded (EX)

**Bold** – Pole
Italics – Fastest Lap
† — Did not finish, but classified

=== Teams ===
Points are given only to the two highest-classified cars of each team in every race and qualifying.

Pos.	Team	GBG (Sweden)		LJU (Sweden)		KNU (Sweden)				MAN (Sweden)		Pts
Pos.	Team	RD1	RD2	RD1	RD2	RD1	RD2	RD3	RD4	RD1	RD2	Pts
1	(Sweden) Brink Motorsport	1^{4,5}	2^{1,3}	1^{1,2}	1^{1,3}	1^{1,2,3}	1^{1,2,3}	1^{1,2,3,}	1^{1,2,3}	1^{1,2,5}	1^{1,2,5}	479
1	(Sweden) Brink Motorsport	2	4	3	2	8	2	2	2	3	2	479
2	(Sweden) CUPRA Dealer Team – PWR Racing	4^{2,3}	1^{4,5}	2^{3}	4^{2,5}	3^{4,5}	6^{5}	3	6^{4}	2^{3}	3^{4}	250
2	(Sweden) CUPRA Dealer Team – PWR Racing	5	8	4	6	10	7	6	8	4	5	250
3	(Sweden) Exion Racing VW	3^{1}	3^{2}	5^{4}	5^{4}	2^{3}	4^{4}	4	4^{5}	5	4^{3}	195
3	(Sweden) Exion Racing VW	9	7	7	Ret	5	8	10	9	6	6	195
4	(Sweden) Exion Racing BMW	7	6	6^{5}	3	4	5	5^{4,5}	5	7^{4}	8^{3}	129
4	(Sweden) Exion Racing BMW	10	9	10	7	6	9	7	7	9	Ret	129
