= Melvin Kalousdian =

Swedish racing driver (born 2011)

- Nationality: (Sweden) Swedish
- Born: 24 August 2011 (age 15) Örebro, Sweden

Ginetta Junior Championship career
- Debut season: 2026
- Current team: R Racing
- Car number: 5
- Starts: 25
- Wins: 4
- Podiums: 8
- Poles: 4
- Fastest laps: 1
- Best finish: 3rd in 2026

Previous series
- 2025: Formula Nordic

Championship titles
- 2025 2025: Formula Nordic JSM; Formula Nordic Championship
- Statistics up to date as of 19 May 2026.

Melvin Kalousdian (born 24 August 2011) is a Swedish racing driver who last competed for R Racing in the Ginetta Junior Championship.

Born in Örebro, Kalousdian began karting at the age of seven before stepping up to single-seaters and winning the 2025 Formula Nordic title on debut, doing so at 13 years old.

== Career ==
=== Karting (2018–2024) ===
Kalousdian began karting in 2018 after discovering it at a local camping site. Starting out in micro karts, Kalousdian stepped up to mini karts in 2021, winning the MKR Series Sweden title in both of his seasons in the category. Moving to junior karts for the following two years, Kalousdian most notably won the Swedish Championship, South Swedish Kart Cup and the Rok Cup Superfinal during his final year of karting in 2024.

=== Formula Nordic (2025) ===
Kalousdian made his single-seater debut in 2025, competing for Race Team Gelleråsen in Formula Nordic. After winning all three races at Anderstorp to take an early championship lead, Kalousdian took two more wins between the Karlskoga and Ljungbyhed rounds as he fell to second in points. Kalousdian then won all three races at the Falkenberg round to take back the points lead, before winning five of the last six races to seal the Swedish and Nordic titles.

=== Ginetta Junior Championship (2026–) ===
The following year, Kalousdian moved to car racing, joining R Racing to compete in the Ginetta Junior Championship. Starting off the season with a third-place finish at Donington Park, Kalousdian finished no lower than sixth at Silverstone, before taking his second podium of the season at Oulton Park. Two rounds later, Kalousdian achieved his maiden pole position at Zandvoort, a round in which he matched his season-best result of third in race three. After that, Kalousdian won four races in a row between the Snetterton and Donington Park rounds, before rounding out the season with a podium at Brands Hatch to take third in the overall standings.

=== Formula One ===
In March 2026, Kalousdian was announced as a member of the Red Bull Junior Team.

== Karting record ==
=== Karting career summary ===
Season	Series	Team	Position
2019	Juniorfestivalen — Micro		2nd
2019	SMK Västerås Höstrusket — Micro		2nd
2019	Kristianstad KK Grande Finale — Micro		3rd
2019	Raket Cup Sweden — Micro		5th
2019	MKR Sweden — Micro		5th
2021	IAME Winter Cup — X30 Mini	KH Racing Team	15th
2021	MKR Series Sweden — Junior 60	SMK Örebro	1st
2021	Swedish Kart Championship — Junior 60	SMK Örebroavdelning	9th
2021	Sydsvenskans Kart Cup — Junior 60		10th
2021	IAME Warriors Final — X30 Mini	Gold Kart Racing Team	NC
2021	WSK Final Cup — 60 Mini	Gold Kart Racing Team	34th
2022	WSK Super Master Series — 60 Mini	Gold Kart Racing Team	95th
2022	Andrea Margutti Trophy — 60 Mini	Gold Kart Racing Team	21st
2022	MKR Series Sweden — Junior 60	SMK Örebroavdelningen	1st
2022	WSK Open Cup — 60 Mini	SMK Örebroavdelningen	43rd
2022	Trofeo Delle Industrie — 60 Mini	AD Motorsport	18th
2022	WSK Final Cup — 60 Mini	Ward Racing	18th
2023	WSK Champions Cup — OK-J	Ward Racing	25th
2023	WSK Super Master Series — OK-J	Ward Racing	30th
2023	Andrea Margutti Trophy — OK-J	Ward Racing	18th
2023	Trofeo Delle Industrie — OK-J	Ward Racing	15th
2023	WSK Final Cup — OK-J	Ward Racing	59th
2024	WSK Super Master Series — OK-J	Ward Racing	88th
2024	Champions of the Future Euro Series — OK-J	Ward Racing	132nd
2024	Karting European Championship — OK-J	Ward Racing	122nd
2024	Swedish Championship — Junior 125		1st
2024	South Swedish Kart Cup — OK-J		1st
2024	Sydsvenskans Kart Champion Cup — Junior 125		5th
2024	Rok Cup Superfinal — Junior Rok	Ward Racing	1st

== Racing record ==
=== Racing career summary ===
Season	Series	Team	Races	Wins	Poles	F/Laps	Podiums	Points	Position
2025	Formula Nordic	Race Team Gelleråsen	17	13	2	2	14	371	**1st**
2026	Ginetta Junior Championship	R Racing	25	4	4	1	8	473	**3rd**

=== Complete Formula Nordic results ===
(key) (Races in bold indicate pole position) (Races in italics indicate fastest lap)

Year	Team	1	2	3	4	5	6	7	8	9	10	11	12	13	14	15	16	17	DC	Points
2025	Race Team Gelleråsen	**AND**; **1**; 1^{1}	AND; 2; 1	AND; 3; 1	KAR; 1; 2^{3}	KAR; 2; 1	KAR; 3 Ret	LJU; 1; 8†^{2}	LJU; 2; 1	FAL; 1; 1^{2}	FAL; 2; 1	FAL; 3; 1	**JYL1**; **1**; 1^{1}	JYL1; 2 Ret	JYL1; 3; 1	JYL2; 1; 1^{3}	JYL2; 2; 1	JYL2; 3; 1	1st	371

=== Complete Ginetta Junior Championship results ===
(key) (Races in bold indicate pole position; races in italics indicate fastest lap)

Year	Entrant	1	2	3	4	5	6	7	8	9	10	11	12	13	14	15	16	17	18	19	20	21	22	23	24	25	Pos	Points
2026	R Racing	DON1; 1; 6	DON1; 2; 6	DON1; 3; 3	SIL; 1; 6	SIL; 2; 5	SIL; 3; 5	OUL; 1; 18	OUL; 2; 7	OUL; 3; 3	CRO; 1; 20	CRO; 2; 7	CRO; 3; 14	CRO; 4; 6	**ZAN**; **1**; 5	ZAN; 2; 5	ZAN; 3; 3	**SNE**; **1**; 1	**SNE**; **2**; 1	SNE; 3; 1	**DON2**; **1**; 1	DON2; 2; 4	DON2; 3; 15	BRH; 1; 2	BRH; 2; 5	BRH; 3; 13	3rd	473
