= Richard Olson (racing driver) =

Swedish–German racing driver (born 2003)

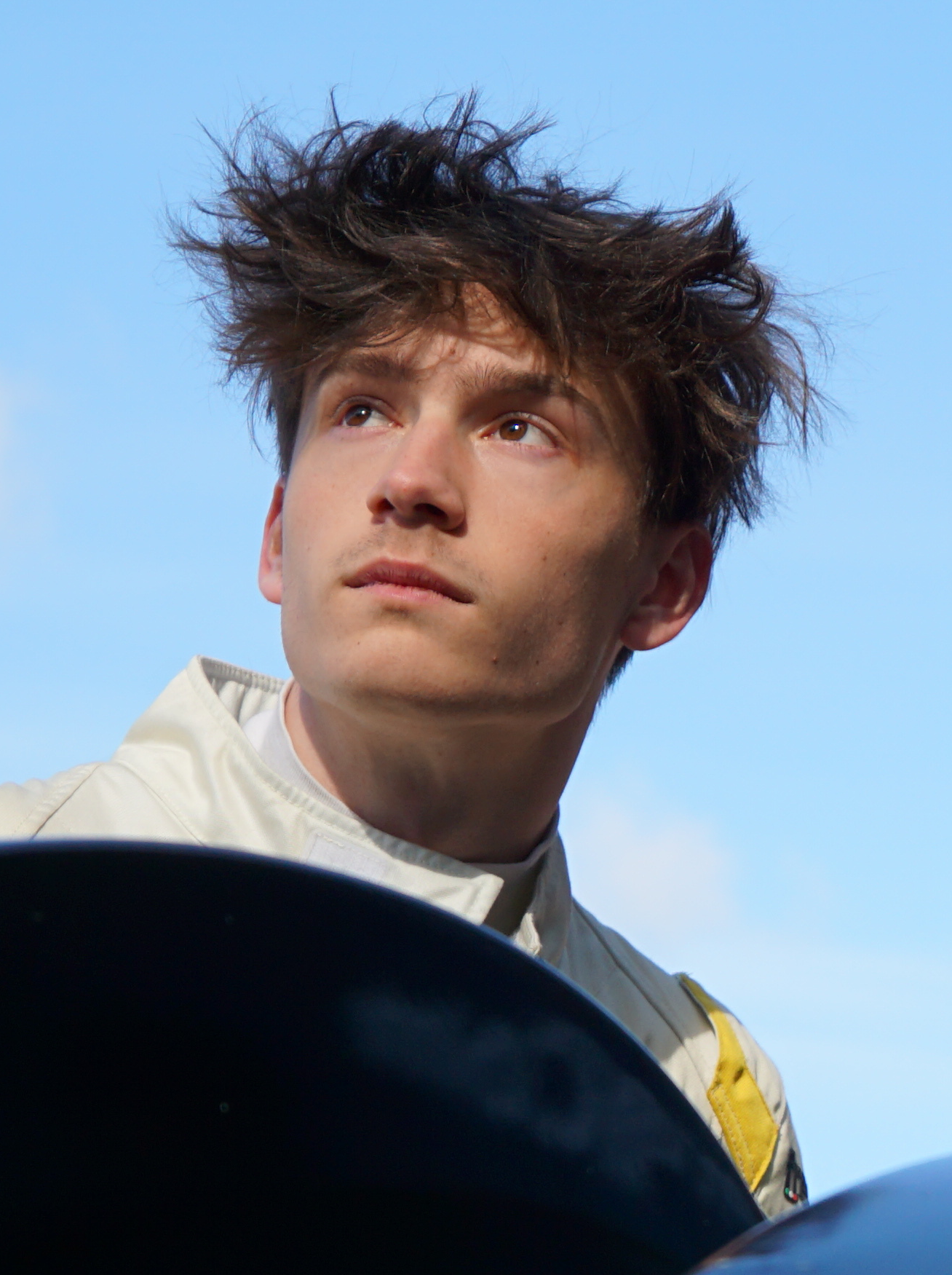
- Olson at Mantorp Raceway in 2024
- Born: Gothenburg, Sweden
- Years active: 2019–present

Richard Olson is a Swedish–German racing driver who competes in the Formula Nordic championship with Proston Performance Group.

== Career ==
=== Karting ===
Olson started karting in 2019. He competed in two races that year with PDB Racing Team Sweden. The following year, Olson competed in 23 races across Sweden and finished third, fourth and 38th in that years championships.

The 2021 season would come to a halt for Olson after an arm fracture in the first race. After a return in August, he won Kart Cup Väst and finished 13th in SKCC.

In 2022, Olson won the Swedish Kart League and the SKCC. Olson made his International Karting debut in June when he competed in one of the European Championship rounds in Kristianstad. He finished in 58th position.

=== Aquila Formula 1000 ===
After three testdays in 2022, Olson decided to take part in the championship in 2023. Olson ended the season early for unknown reasons which made him 13th overall with 215 points scored.

Olson remained in Aquila to have another go at the championship the following year. After 24 races, Olson won the 2024 Aquila Formula 1000 championship in the final round at Ring Knutstorp. Olson broke the record for most points, wins and pole positions in a single season.

== Personal life ==
Olson was born in Gothenburg, Sweden, but he is however half German on his mother's side and has German citizenship. Richard's father Denny Olson and grandfather Sven Olson were both Swedish musicians.

== Karting record ==
=== Karting career summary ===
Season	Series	Team	Position
2020	SKCC	PDB Racing Team Sweden	3rd
2020	Kart Cup Väst	PDB Racing Team Sweden	4th
2020	SKCC	PDB Racing Team Sweden	38th
2021	SKCC	AD Motorsport	13th
2021	Distrikt Mästerskap	AD Motorsport	1st
2021	Kart Cup Väst	AD Motorsport	1st
2022	SKCC	AD Motorsport	1st
2022	Swedish Kart League	AD Motorsport	1st

== Racing record ==
=== Racing career summary ===
Season	Series	Team	Races	Wins	Poles	F/Laps	Podiums	Points	Position
2023	Aquila Formula 1000	Proston Performance Group	9	0	0	0	1	215	13th
2024	Aquila Formula 1000	Proston Performance Group	24	12	5	2	16	795	1st
2025	Formula Nordic	Proston Performance Group	17	3	2	3	15	284	2nd
