= 2026 Ginetta Junior Championship =

British one-make automobile racing championship

The 2026 Ginetta Junior Championship was the 22nd season of the Ginetta Junior Championship, a British one-make motor racing series for junior drivers using Ginetta G40 Junior Evo cars. The championship is contested by drivers aged 14 to 17 and is organised as an entry-level car racing series for young drivers moving from karting into circuit racing.

The season compromised of an eight-event, 25-race calendar. It opened at Donington Park on 11 April and concluded at Brands Hatch on 27 September. For 2026, SRO Motorsports Group assumed operational control of Ginetta's UK-based championships, including Ginetta Juniors.

== Teams and drivers ==
Team	No.	Driver	Rounds
Paradine Competition	31	(Italy) Samuel Del Gaudio	1–3, 5
Paradine Competition	2	(Brazil) Vicky Farfus	1–6
R Racing	2	(Brazil) Vicky Farfus	7
R Racing	4	(United Kingdom) Lewis Goff	All
R Racing	5	(Sweden) Melvin Kalousdian	All
R Racing	17	(United Kingdom) Max Murray	All
R Racing	18	(United Kingdom) Riley Cranham	All
R Racing	26	(United Kingdom) Jesse Phillips	All
R Racing	27	(United Kingdom) Louis Radcliffe	6–8
R Racing	36	(United Kingdom) Sebastian Leusch	All
Project R	3	(Netherlands) Jorn Helder	1–4
E3 Sport	6	(United States) Andrew Robinson	1–6
Elite Motorsport	7	(Romania) Ian Danicska	4–5, 8
Elite Motorsport	8	(Netherlands) Devon Hagelen	All
Elite Motorsport	11	(United Kingdom) Henry Cameron	All
Elite Motorsport	12	(Spain) Daniel Oliver	1–6
Elite Motorsport	24	(United Kingdom) Harrison Mackie	All
Elite Motorsport	44	(Canada) Maxim Kharuk	6–8
Elite Motorsport	46	(United Kingdom) Jacob Ashcroft	All
Elite Motorsport	67	(Ukraine) Vladislav Tomenchuk	1–5
Elite Motorsport	81	(United Kingdom) Finlay Lines	8
MKH Racing	9	(United Kingdom) Bailey Doughty	All
MKH Racing	21	(United Kingdom) Ethan Brass	All
MDD Motorsport	15	(United Kingdom) Addison Smith	All
Pace Performance	20	(United Kingdom) Luca Luen	4
Pace Performance	42	(Canada) Pearce Wade	1–2
Pace Performance	63	(United Kingdom) Henry Carter	1–3
Pace Performance	64	(United Kingdom) Oliver Vaux	6
Pace Performance	73	(United Kingdom) Harry Bartle	All
Pace Performance	75	(United Kingdom) Kai Veitch	1–3
Performance One	22	(United Kingdom) Josh Watts	All
Performance One	47	(United Kingdom) Dominic Darling	All
Performance One	95	(United Kingdom) Noah Young	All
RAB Sport Racing	33	(South Africa) Anesu Maphumulo	All
RAB Sport Racing	52	(United Kingdom) Oscar Stockley-King	1–2
Orion SPR	84	(United Kingdom) Jake Woods	1–2

== Calendar ==
All rounds are scheduled to run alongside the British GT Championship apart from the rounds at Zandvoort, Croft and the first Donington round.

Round	Circuit	Date
1	(United Kingdom) Donington Park, Leicestershire (Grand Prix Circuit)	11–12 April
2	(United Kingdom) Silverstone, Northamptonshire (Grand Prix Circuit)	25–26 April
3	(United Kingdom) Oulton Park, Cheshire (International Circuit)	23–25 May
4	(United Kingdom) Croft Circuit, North Yorkshire	27–28 June
5	(Netherlands) Zandvoort Circuit, Zandvoort	11–12 July
6	(United Kingdom) Snetterton, Norfolk (300 Circuit)	15–16 August
7	(United Kingdom) Donington Park, Leicestershire (Grand Prix Circuit)	5–6 September
8	(United Kingdom) Brands Hatch, Kent (Grand Prix Circuit)	26–27 September

== Race results ==
Round		Circuit	Date	Pole position	Fastest lap	Winning driver	Winning team	Rookie Winner
1	R1	(United Kingdom) Donington Park, Leicestershire (Grand Prix Circuit)	11–12 April	(United Kingdom) Lewis Goff	(United Kingdom) Jesse Phillips	(United Kingdom) Lewis Goff	R Racing	(United Kingdom) Lewis Goff
1	R2	(United Kingdom) Donington Park, Leicestershire (Grand Prix Circuit)	11–12 April	(United Kingdom) Lewis Goff	(United Kingdom) Lewis Goff	(United Kingdom) Lewis Goff	R Racing	(United Kingdom) Lewis Goff
1	R3	(United Kingdom) Donington Park, Leicestershire (Grand Prix Circuit)	11–12 April		(United Kingdom) Jesse Phillips	(United Kingdom) Lewis Goff	R Racing	(United Kingdom) Lewis Goff
2	R1	(United Kingdom) Silverstone, Northamptonshire (Grand Prix Circuit)	25–26 April	(United Kingdom) Harry Bartle	(United Kingdom) Harry Bartle	(United Kingdom) Lewis Goff	R Racing	(United Kingdom) Lewis Goff
2	R2	(United Kingdom) Silverstone, Northamptonshire (Grand Prix Circuit)	25–26 April	(United Kingdom) Harry Bartle	(United Kingdom) Jesse Phillips	(United Kingdom) Harry Bartle	Pace Performance	(United Kingdom) Lewis Goff
2	R3	(United Kingdom) Silverstone, Northamptonshire (Grand Prix Circuit)	25–26 April		(United Kingdom) Harry Bartle	(United Kingdom) Lewis Goff	R Racing	(United Kingdom) Lewis Goff
3	R1	(United Kingdom) Oulton Park, Cheshire (International Circuit)	23–25 May	(United Kingdom) Harrison Mackie	(United Kingdom) Max Murray	(United Kingdom) Josh Watts (Note: Harrison Mackie originally won the race, but received a penalty of 6 positions for causing a collision. Josh Watts, initially classified second, thus inherited the win.)	Performance One	(United Kingdom) Jesse Phillips
3	R2	(United Kingdom) Oulton Park, Cheshire (International Circuit)	23–25 May	(United Kingdom) Riley Cranham	(United Kingdom) Lewis Goff	(United Kingdom) Harrison Mackie (Note: Riley Cranham was the first driver to cross the finish line, but received a 15-second penalty for track limits. Harrison Mackie, who was the second driver to cross the finish line, thus inherited the win.)	Elite Motorsport	(United Kingdom) Harrison Mackie
3	R3	(United Kingdom) Oulton Park, Cheshire (International Circuit)	23–25 May		(United Kingdom) Riley Cranham	(United Kingdom) Lewis Goff	R Racing	(United Kingdom) Lewis Goff
4	R1	(United Kingdom) Croft Circuit, North Yorkshire	27–28 June	(United Kingdom) Jacob Ashcroft	(United Kingdom) Harrison Mackie	(United Kingdom) Jacob Ashcroft (Note: Riley Cranham originally won the race, but received a 16.1-second penalty for causing a collision. Jacob Ashcroft, initially classified second, thus inherited the win.)	Elite Motorsport	(United Kingdom) Jacob Ashcroft
4	R2	(United Kingdom) Croft Circuit, North Yorkshire	27–28 June	(United Kingdom) Riley Cranham	(United Kingdom) Josh Watts	(United Kingdom) Harrison Mackie	Elite Motorsport	(United Kingdom) Harrison Mackie
4	R3	(United Kingdom) Croft Circuit, North Yorkshire	27–28 June	(United Kingdom) Riley Cranham	(United Kingdom) Harrison Mackie	(United Kingdom) Riley Cranham	R Racing	(United Kingdom) Riley Cranham
4	R4	(United Kingdom) Croft Circuit, North Yorkshire	27–28 June	(United Kingdom) Riley Cranham	(Netherlands) Devon Hagelen	(United Kingdom) Harry Bartle (Note: Riley Cranham originally won the race, but received a penalty of 4 positions for causing a collision. Harry Bartle, initially classified second, thus inherited the win.)	Pace Performance	(United Kingdom) Harrison Mackie
5	R1	(Netherlands) Zandvoort Circuit, Zandvoort	11–12 July	(Sweden) Melvin Kalousdian	(United Kingdom) Lewis Goff	(United Kingdom) Lewis Goff	R Racing	(United Kingdom) Lewis Goff
5	R2	(Netherlands) Zandvoort Circuit, Zandvoort	11–12 July	(United Kingdom) Lewis Goff	(United Kingdom) Lewis Goff	(United Kingdom) Harrison Mackie	Elite Motorsport	(United Kingdom) Harrison Mackie
5	R3	(Netherlands) Zandvoort Circuit, Zandvoort	11–12 July		(United Kingdom) Harrison Mackie	(United Kingdom) Lewis Goff	R Racing	(United Kingdom) Lewis Goff
6	R1	(United Kingdom) Snetterton, Norfolk (300 Circuit)	15–16 August	(Sweden) Melvin Kalousdian	(United Kingdom) Riley Cranham	(Sweden) Melvin Kalousdian	R Racing	(Netherlands) Devon Hagelen
6	R2	(United Kingdom) Snetterton, Norfolk (300 Circuit)	15–16 August	(Sweden) Melvin Kalousdian	(United Kingdom) Riley Cranham	(Sweden) Melvin Kalousdian	R Racing	(United Kingdom) Riley Cranham
6	R3	(United Kingdom) Snetterton, Norfolk (300 Circuit)	15–16 August		(United Kingdom) Sebastian Leusch	(Sweden) Melvin Kalousdian	R Racing	(United Kingdom) Sebastian Leusch
7	R1	(United Kingdom) Donington Park, Leicestershire (Grand Prix Circuit)	5–6 September	(Sweden) Melvin Kalousdian	(Sweden) Melvin Kalousdian	(Sweden) Melvin Kalousdian	R Racing	(United Kingdom) Riley Cranham
7	R2	(United Kingdom) Donington Park, Leicestershire (Grand Prix Circuit)	5–6 September	(United Kingdom) Riley Cranham	(United Kingdom) Harry Bartle	(United Kingdom) Riley Cranham	R Racing	(United Kingdom) Riley Cranham
7	R3	(United Kingdom) Donington Park, Leicestershire (Grand Prix Circuit)	5–6 September		(United Kingdom) Harrison Mackie	(United Kingdom) Lewis Goff (Note: Riley Cranham was the first driver to cross the finish line, but received a 5-second penalty for track limits. Lewis Goff, who was the second driver to cross the finish line, thus inherited the win.)	R Racing	(United Kingdom) Lewis Goff
8	R1	(United Kingdom) Brands Hatch, Kent (Grand Prix Circuit)	26–27 September	(United Kingdom) Jesse Phillips	(United Kingdom) Riley Cranham	(United Kingdom) Harrison Mackie	Elite Motorsport	(United Kingdom) Harrison Mackie
8	R2	(United Kingdom) Brands Hatch, Kent (Grand Prix Circuit)	26–27 September	(United Kingdom) Jesse Phillips	(United Kingdom) Lewis Goff	(United Kingdom) Riley Cranham	R Racing	(United Kingdom) Riley Cranham
8	R3	(United Kingdom) Brands Hatch, Kent (Grand Prix Circuit)	26–27 September		(United Kingdom) Riley Cranham	(United Kingdom) Lewis Goff	R Racing	(United Kingdom) Lewis Goff

== Championship standings ==
Championship points are awarded to classified finishers in each race as follows:

Position	1st	2nd	3rd	4th	5th	6th	7th	8th	9th	10th	11th	12th	13th	14th	15th	16th	17th	18th	19th	20th
Points	35	30	26	22	20	18	16	14	12	11	10	9	8	7	6	5	4	3	2	1

Competitors count all championship rounds less two dropped scores. A round cannot be dropped where the competitor receives certain penalties or is disqualified from a classified race result for a sporting or technical infringement.

=== Drivers' Championship ===
(key) (Races in bold indicate pole position; races in italics indicate fastest lap, (R) indicates rookie season)

Pos	Driver	DON1 (United Kingdom)			SIL (United Kingdom)			OUL (United Kingdom)			CRO (United Kingdom)				ZAN (Netherlands)			SNE (United Kingdom)			DON2 (United Kingdom)			BRA (United Kingdom)			Total	Drop	Pen.	Points
1	(United Kingdom) Lewis Goff **(R)**	**1**	**1**	1	1	2	1	4	5	1	24	3	9	4	1	**3**	1	Ret	4	4	5	3	1	3	4	1	652		6	646
2	(United Kingdom) Harrison Mackie **(R)**	19	3	4	4	Ret	12	**7**	1	2	8	1	2	2	2	1	2	Ret	10	13	3	5	2	1	3	3	553	2	15	536
3	(Sweden) Melvin Kalousdian	6	6	3	6	5	5	18	7	3	20	7	14	6	**5**	5	3	**1**	**1**	1	**1**	4	15	2	5	13	504	7	24	473
4	(United Kingdom) Jesse Phillips **(R)**	3	5	2	5	8	3	2	15	8	2	5	3	3	10	6	6	Ret	9	6	19	6	Ret	**5**	**2**	2	469		12	457
5	(United Kingdom) Harry Bartle	2	2	7	**2**	**1**	2	6	4	7	16	8	4	1	3	9	4	8	8	10	Ret	2	DSQ	4	6	16	481	5	27	449
6	(United Kingdom) Riley Cranham **(R)**	10	4	6	9	7	27	5	**24**	6	9	**6**	**1**	**5**	Ret	2	5	3	2	3	2	**1**	4	Ret	1	7	478		48	430
7	(United Kingdom) Jacob Ashcroft **(R)**	8	9	5	3	3	4	3	2	20	**1**	2	5	Ret	4	4	8	Ret	14	11	9	Ret	Ret	6	11	4	400		9	391
8	(Netherlands) Devon Hagelen **(R)**	14	Ret	13	Ret	13	10	14	6	4	11	15	10	7	9	8	7	2	7	8	4	7	12	19	14	5	303		9	294
8	(United Kingdom) Max Murray **(R)**	4	7	17	8	4	7	16	3	12	3	Ret	6	9	6	21	22	14	5	5	7	12	DSQ	15	Ret	9	299		12	287
10	(United Kingdom) Sebastian Leusch **(R)**	9	10	8	11	24	16	19	20	19	5	9	7	12	8	10	10	4	3	2	14	16	3	7	20	14	291	1	15	275
11	(United Kingdom) Henry Cameron	15	11	10	13	6	6	10	8	5	10	10	11	11	15	7	9	7	15	15	8	17	9	13	15	6	282	10		272
12	(United Kingdom) Noah Young	7	Ret	9	7	23	9	21	Ret	10	4	12	17	13	11	12	13	6	11	17	12	Ret	8	8	10	10	228		6	222
13	(United Kingdom) Josh Watts	Ret	14	Ret	Ret	10	8	1	21	Ret	6	Ret	23	10	14	Ret	14	10	6	7	Ret	15	6	16	18	18	191		6	185
14	(United Kingdom) Bailey Doughty **(R)**	12	Ret	19	15	14	18	12	11	Ret	21	Ret	19	16	16	11	15	12	17	14	16	8	11	10	9	8	160		12	148
15	(United Kingdom) Dominic Darling **(R)**	Ret	23	21	21	16	17	23	Ret	13	12	13	15	15	19	16	20	9	23	16	6	9	5	11	12	17	144			144
16	(United Kingdom) Addison Smith **(R)**	11	12	16	10	9	Ret	11	9	18	14	14	12	Ret	17	14	17	Ret	12	12	13	10	Ret	WD	WD	WD	146		6	140
17	(Spain) Daniel Oliver **(R)**	5	8	18	DSQ	DSQ	DSQ	8	16	Ret	DSQ	4	8	8	7	Ret	12	5	13	9							171		36	135
18	(United Kingdom) Ethan Brass **(R)**	22	19	25	18	18	20	24	14	15	23	17	18	14	21	17	19	15	16	20	11	11	7	14	13	15	111			111
19	(Ukraine) Vladislav Tomenchuk **(R)**	13	Ret	14	12	12	11	9	19	9	13	11	13	DSQ	18	15	16										109		12	97
20	(Netherlands) Jorn Helder **(R)**	21	15	12	17	11	15	15	10	14	15	16	16	Ret													75		6	69
21	(Romania) Ian Danicska **(R)**										7	19	20	Ret	13	13	11							17	7	Ret	65			65
22	(United Kingdom) Kai Veitch **(R)**	16	12	11	Ret	15	13	13	12	11																	65			65
23	(Brazil) Vicky Farfus **(R)**	17	18	Ret	16	21	22	22	17	Ret	17	20	24	17	12	Ret	Ret	11	18	18	18	13	10				72		12	60
24	(United Kingdom) Louis Radcliffe **(R)**																	13	19	24	10	14	Ret	9	17	12	53			53
25	(United States) Andrew Robinson **(R)**	20	16	15	20	17	19	20	13	16	22	21	22	18	20	18	18	16	21	19							50			50
26	(United Kingdom) Finlay Lines **(R)**																							12	8	11	33			33
27	(South Africa) Anesu Maphumulo **(R)**	26	21	24	25	22	25	26	22	Ret	18	18	21	19	23	20	Ret	Ret	Ret	23	17	18	14	18	16	19	33			33
28	(United Kingdom) Henry Carter **(R)**	18	20	Ret	14	Ret	14	17	18	Ret																	25			25
29	(Canada) Maxim Kharuk **(R)**																	Ret	22	21	15	19	13	Ret	19	Ret	18			18
30	(Canada) Pearce Wade **(R)**	24	17	20	19	19	21																				9			9
31	(United Kingdom) Oliver Vaux **(R)**																	17	20	22							5			5
32	(United Kingdom) Luca Luen **(R)**										19	22	25	20													3			3
33	(United Kingdom) Jake Woods **(R)**	WD	WD	WD	22	20	24																				1			1
34	(United Kingdom) Oscar Stockley-King **(R)**	25	22	23	24	25	23																				0			0
35	(Italy) Samuel Del Gaudio **(R)**	23	DSQ	22	23	26	26	25	23	17					22	19	21										6		12	-6

== Ginetta Junior Winter Series ==
=== Teams and drivers ===
Team	No.	Driver
Elite Motorsport	7	(Romania) Ian Danicska
Elite Motorsport	20	(United Kingdom) Luca Luen
Elite Motorsport	22	(Poland) Julia Angelard
Elite Motorsport	46	(United Kingdom) Jacob Ashcroft
Elite Motorsport	81	(United Kingdom) Finlay Lines
Orion SPR	12	(United Kingdom) Charlie Halewood
Orion SPR	88	(Netherlands) Luuk Taal
R Racing	21	(United Kingdom) Noah Baglin
R Racing	27	(United Kingdom) Louis Radcliffe
R Racing	33	(South Africa) Anesu Maphumulo
R Racing	36	(United Kingdom) Sebastian Leusch
R Racing	58	(Canada) Rayan Ghandour
MK Racing	26	(United Kingdom) Barnaby Brewer
Performance One	47	(United Kingdom) Dominic Darling
