= Kai Veitch =

British and Australian racing driver (born 2010)

- Nationality: (United Kingdom) British (Australia) Australian
- Born: 5 August 2010 (age 16) Paddington, London, England

Ginetta Junior Championship career
- Debut season: 2026
- Current team: Pace Performance
- Car number: 75

Previous series
- 2025: Ginetta Junior Winter Series
- Statistics up to date as of 16 June 2026.

Kai Veitch (pronounced /kaɪ viːtʃ/; born 5 August 2010) is a British and Australian racing driver who competes in the Ginetta Junior Championship with Pace Performance.

Following a karting career headlined by finishing third in the 2025 Kartmasters British Grand Prix in Senior Max, Veitch made his car racing debut in the Ginetta Junior Winter Series later that year before joining Pace Performance for his first full season of car racing in 2026.

== Early life and background ==
Veitch was born in Paddington, London. He holds British and Australian nationality and has Filipino heritage on his mother's side.

Alongside his racing career, Veitch attends Minerva Virtual Academy, and as of 2025, Veitch is also studying German.

== Career ==
=== Karting (2019–2025) ===
Veitch discovered karting at the age of three after seeing junior karts at a farmers' market, and first drove a kart on his fourth birthday. Nine years later, Veitch began karting in arrive-and-drive competition in 2019, in the 2019 Daytona Sandown Park Junior InKart Championship. After progressing through owner-driver and club-level karting over the next three years, during which he worked with Enzo Mucci, who has notably worked with Formula 1 drivers Liam Lawson and Oliver Bearman, for off-track preparation.

Over the following two years, Veitch raced in junior karts, as a driver for Synergy Factory Team (2023) and KR Sport (2024), before stepping up to Senior Max the following year, in which he finished third in the Kartmasters British Grand Prix after starting 14th.

=== Ginetta Juniors (2025–) ===
Veitch made his car racing debut in the Ginetta Junior Winter Series with Elite Motorsport, after being nominated by Ginetta as one of two Ginetta Junior Scholarship finalists making their Junior debuts at the event. In the three-race Winter Series, Veitch scored a best result of eighth in the finale, as he ended the season 14th in points.

The following year, Veitch joined Pace Performance for the 2026 Ginetta Junior Championship. At the opening round at Donington Park, he finished 16th, 12th and 11th in the three races. In the following round at Silverstone, Veitch finished 15th in race two and 13th in race three.

In 2026, Veitch also launched #TeamKV, an online supporter initiative for his move into car racing.

== Karting record ==
=== Karting career summary ===
Season	Series	Team	Position
2019	Daytona Sandown Park Junior InKart Championships — Cadet		
2022	IKR Turkey Trot — Mini Max	PRP Karting	
2023	British Kart Championship — Junior Max	Synergy Factory Team	31st
2023	Rotax Max Euro Trophy — Junior Max	Synergy Factory Team	NC
2023	Ultimate Karting Championship — Junior Max	Synergy Factory Team	
2024	Champions Winter Trophy / BNL — Junior Max	KR Sport	
2024	British Kart Championship — Junior Max	KR Sport	17th
2024	Ultimate Karting Championship — Junior Max	KR Sport	
2024	Kartmasters British Grand Prix — Junior Max	KR Sport	24th
2024	RMC International Trophy — Junior Max	KR Sport	46th
2025	Rotax Max Winter Series — Senior Max	KR Sport	12th
2025	Rotax Max Euro Trophy — Senior Max	KR Sport	14th
2025	Kartmasters British Grand Prix — Senior Max	KR Sport	3rd
2025	RMC International Trophy — Senior Max	KR Sport	53rd

== Racing record ==
=== Racing career summary ===
Season	Series	Team	Races	Wins	Poles	F/Laps	Podiums	Points	Position
2025	Ginetta Junior Winter Series	Elite Motorsport	3	0	0	0	0	28	14th
2026	Ginetta Junior Championship	Pace Performance	9	0	0	0	0	65	22nd

* Season still in progress.
