= 2026 F4 Brazilian Championship =

Brazilian motorsports competition

The 2026 F4 Brazilian Championship is the fifth season of the F4 Brazilian Championship. It is a multi-event motor racing championship for open wheel, formula racing cars regulated according to FIA Formula 4 regulations.

== Teams and drivers ==
All pre-selected teams were Brazilian-registered.

Team	No.	Driver	Class	Rounds
TMG Racing	1	(Brazil) Celo Hahn		1–5, NC
TMG Racing	4	(Argentina) Gianni Giovanelli	R	1–5, NC
TMG Racing	8	(Brazil) Vicky Farfus		NC
TMG Racing	9	(Brazil) Pedro Bartelle	R	5
TMG Racing	23	(Argentina) Federico Díaz		NC
TMG Racing	34	(Brazil) Davi Mantoan		NC
TMG Racing	45	(Brazil) João Paulo Sanzovo	R	1–5
TMG Racing	59	(Brazil) Pietro Mesquita		1–5, NC
TMG Racing	88	(Brazil) Bernardo Gentil	R	1–5
TMG Racing	15	(Brazil) Alexandre Louza	R	1–2
Cavaleiro Sports	15	(Brazil) Alexandre Louza	R	3–5, NC
Cavaleiro Sports	3	(Brazil) Naim Saleh	R	2–3, NC
Cavaleiro Sports	6	(Brazil) Guilherme Moleiro	R	2
Cavaleiro Sports	11	(Argentina) Thiago Palotini		NC
Cavaleiro Sports	12	(Brazil) Alan Soloviov	R	1, 3–5, NC
Cavaleiro Sports	22	(Brazil) Gustavo Almeida	R	5
Cavaleiro Sports	29	(Brazil) Enricco Abreu		1–5
Cavaleiro Sports	33	(Brazil) Fabricio Fogaça	R	1, 4–5, NC
Cavaleiro Sports	37	(Argentina) Fausto Arnaudo		2–5
Cavaleiro Sports	77	(Brazil) Rodrigo Rocha	R	1
Cavaleiro Sports	105	(Brazil) Luiz Queiroz	R	3–4, NC
Starrett Bandeiras Bassani	16	(Argentina) Franco Paolini	R	2–5, NC
Starrett Bandeiras Bassani	21	(Brazil) Elias Barbosa	R	1–5, NC
Starrett Bandeiras Bassani	26	(Brazil) Pedro Lins		1–5, NC
Starrett Bandeiras Bassani	48	(Brazil) Paulo Willemann	R	1–5, NC
Starrett Bandeiras Bassani	72	(Argentina) Ignacio Díaz	R	1–4

Icon	Class
R	Rookie

== Race calendar ==
The schedule with the planned circuits was revealed on 6 January 2026, however the calendar was changed for many times.

Round		Circuit	Date	Pole position	Fastest lap	Winning driver	Winning team	Rookie winner
1	R1	Interlagos Circuit, São Paulo	25 April	(Brazil) Pietro Mesquita	(Argentina) Ignacio Díaz	(Brazil) Pietro Mesquita	TMG Racing	(Brazil) Bernardo Gentil
1	R2	Interlagos Circuit, São Paulo	25 April		(Brazil) Pedro Lins	(Brazil) Celo Hahn	TMG Racing	(Argentina) Ignacio Díaz
1	R3	Interlagos Circuit, São Paulo	26 April	(Brazil) Bernardo Gentil	(Brazil) Pedro Lins	(Brazil) Bernardo Gentil	TMG Racing	(Brazil) Bernardo Gentil
2	R1	Autódromo Velo Città, Mogi Guaçu	25 July	(Argentina) Fausto Arnaudo	(Argentina) Fausto Arnaudo	(Argentina) Fausto Arnaudo	Cavaleiro Sports	(Argentina) Ignacio Díaz
2	R2	Autódromo Velo Città, Mogi Guaçu	26 July		(Brazil) João Paulo Sanzovo	(Brazil) Pedro Lins	Starrett Bandeiras Bassani	(Brazil) Guilherme Moleiro
2	R3	Autódromo Velo Città, Mogi Guaçu	26 July	(Argentina) Fausto Arnaudo	(Argentina) Fausto Arnaudo	(Argentina) Fausto Arnaudo	Cavaleiro Sports	(Brazil) Bernardo Gentil
3	R1	Interlagos Circuit, São Paulo	5 September	(Argentina) Fausto Arnaudo	(Brazil) Bernardo Gentil	(Argentina) Fausto Arnaudo	Cavaleiro Sports	(Brazil) Bernardo Gentil
3	R2	Interlagos Circuit, São Paulo	6 September		(Argentina) Fausto Arnaudo	(Brazil) Celo Hahn	TMG Racing	(Argentina) Ignacio Díaz
3	R3	Interlagos Circuit, São Paulo	6 September	(Argentina) Fausto Arnaudo	(Brazil) Paulo Willemann	(Argentina) Fausto Arnaudo	Cavaleiro Sports	(Brazil) Paulo Willemann
4	R1	Autódromo Internacional de Brasília, Brasília	26 September	(Brazil) Alexandre Louza	(Brazil) Fabricio Fogaça	(Argentina) Fausto Arnaudo	Cavaleiro Sports	(Brazil) Fabricio Fogaça
4	R2	Autódromo Internacional de Brasília, Brasília	27 September		(Brazil) Fabricio Fogaça	(Brazil) Bernardo Gentil	TMG Racing	(Brazil) Bernardo Gentil
4	R3	Autódromo Internacional de Brasília, Brasília	27 September	(Brazil) Celo Hahn	(Brazil) Fabricio Fogaça	(Argentina) Fausto Arnaudo	Cavaleiro Sports	(Brazil) Fabricio Fogaça
NC	R1	Interlagos Circuit, São Paulo	7 November	(Brazil) Fabricio Fogaça	(Brazil) Vicky Farfus	(Brazil) Fabricio Fogaça	Cavaleiro Sports	(Brazil) Fabricio Fogaça
NC	R2	Interlagos Circuit, São Paulo	7 November		(Argentina) Thiago Palotini	(Brazil) Luiz Queiroz	Cavaleiro Sports	(Brazil) Luiz Queiroz
NC	R3	Interlagos Circuit, São Paulo	8 November	(Brazil) Fabricio Fogaça	(Argentina) Federico Díaz	(Brazil) Fabricio Fogaça	Cavaleiro Sports	(Brazil) Fabricio Fogaça
5	R1	Interlagos Circuit, São Paulo	21 November	(Brazil) Fabricio Fogaça	(Argentina) Fausto Arnaudo	(Brazil) Bernardo Gentil	TMG Racing	(Brazil) Bernardo Gentil
5	R2	Interlagos Circuit, São Paulo	22 November		(Brazil) Paulo Willemann	(Brazil) Celo Hahn	TMG Racing	(Brazil) Paulo Willemann
5	R3	Interlagos Circuit, São Paulo	22 November	(Brazil) Bernardo Gentil (Note: Fabricio Fogaça set the fastest lap in the qualifying but received a six-place grid penalty for being penalized for third time during the season. Bernardo Gentil inherited the pole position.)	(Brazil) Fabricio Fogaça	(Brazil) Fabricio Fogaça	Cavaleiro Sports	(Brazil) Fabricio Fogaça
6	R1	Interlagos Circuit, São Paulo	11–13 December					
6	R2	Interlagos Circuit, São Paulo	11–13 December					
6	R3	Interlagos Circuit, São Paulo	11–13 December					

== Championship standings ==
Points are awarded to the top ten classified finishers in 30-minute races and for the top eight classified finishers in 20-minute races. The final individual classifications will be obtained by dropping two worst scores before the final round.

Races	Position, points per race										
Races	**1st**	**2nd**	**3rd**	**4th**	**5th**	**6th**	**7th**	**8th**	**9th**	**10th**	**FL**
Qualifying	2										
30-minute races	25	18	15	12	10	8	6	4	2	1	1
20-minute races	15	12	10	8	6	4	2	1			1

=== Drivers' standings ===
Pos	Driver	INT1			MGG			INT2			BRS			INT3			INT4			INT5	Pts
1	(Argentina) Fausto Arnaudo				**1**	6	**1**	**1**	2	**1**	1	2	1				2	4	3		227
2	(Brazil) Bernardo Gentil	2	6	**1**	4	4	4	2	15†	10	6	1	5				1	5	**2**		182
3	(Brazil) Celo Hahn	7	1	Ret	Ret	Ret	9	8	1	2	2	7	**2**	2	7	3	5	1	4		137
4	(Brazil) Pietro Mesquita	**1**	7	4	5	5	2	4	3	11†	4	3	4	12†	DNS	Ret	Ret	12	6		137
5	(Brazil) Pedro Lins	Ret	3	2	Ret	1	6	6	4	Ret	5	5	7	Ret	14	6	8	2	11		107
6	(Brazil) Fabricio Fogaça	10	DSQ	Ret							3	4	3	**1**	8	**1**	**3**	6	1		89
7	(Brazil) Paulo Willemann	5	5	6	6	Ret	7	3	14	3	Ret	13	10	4	5	5	12	3	12		81
8	(Argentina) Ignacio Díaz	3	4	5	2	7	8	9	5	9	14†	Ret	Ret								68
9	(Brazil) Enricco Abreu	8	2	Ret	3	9	3	7	10	4	13†	12	Ret				11	8	10		66
10	(Brazil) João Paulo Sanzovo	6	9	7	8	3	13	5	13	Ret	11	11	Ret				7	10	9		47
11	(Brazil) Alexandre Louza	4	12†	10	Ret	10	Ret	10	16†	DSQ	**10**	9	DSQ	5	4	13	4	DNS	DNS		27
12	(Argentina) Gianni Giovanelli	Ret	8	DSQ	9	11	10	Ret	9	8	Ret	Ret	8	7	2	7	6	7	8		26
13	(Brazil) Luiz Queiroz							14	8	7	7	6	6	8	1	11					25
14	(Brazil) Alan Soloviov	Ret	11	3				13	7	Ret	8	8	Ret	9	9	10	Ret	Ret	Ret		22
15	(Brazil) Guilherme Moleiro				7	2	11														18
16	(Brazil) Elias Barbosa	9	10	8	11	Ret	14	12	12	5	9	10	11	13†	12	8	DSQ	11	14		18
17	(Brazil) Naim Saleh				12	8	5	11	6	DSQ				Ret	13	4					15
18	(Brazil) Gustavo Almeida																9	14	5		12
19	(Argentina) Franco Paolini				10	Ret	12	Ret	11	6	12	14	9	Ret	15	15	Ret	9	13		11
20	(Brazil) Pedro Bartelle																10	13	7		7
21	(Brazil) Rodrigo Rocha	Ret	Ret	9																	2
non championship round entries ineligible for points
–	(Brazil) Vicky Farfus													3	6	2					–
–	(Argentina) Federico Díaz													6	3	12					–
–	(Argentina) Thiago Palotini													11	11	9					–
–	(Brazil) Davi Mantoan													10	10	14					–

Colour	Result
Gold	Winner
Silver	Second place
Bronze	Third place
Green	Points classification
Blue	Non-points classification
Blue	Non-classified finish (NC)
Purple	Retired, not classified (Ret)
Red	Did not qualify (DNQ)
Red	Did not pre-qualify (DNPQ)
Black	Disqualified (DSQ)
White	Did not start (DNS)
White	Withdrew (WD)
White	Race cancelled (C)
Blank	Did not practice (DNP)
Blank	Did not arrive (DNA)
Blank	Excluded (EX)

**Bold** – Pole
Italics – Fastest Lap
† — Did not finish but classified

=== Rookies' championship ===
Pos	Driver	INT1			MGG			INT2			BRS			INT3			INT4	INT5	Pts
1	(Brazil) Bernardo Gentil	**1**	3	**1**	**2**	3	**1**	1	10†	7	2	1	**2**						204
2	(Argentina) Ignacio Díaz	2	1	3	1	4	4	4	1	6	9†	Ret	Ret						132
3	(Brazil) Paulo Willemann	4	2	4	3	Ret	3	**2**	9	1	Ret	8	6	2	4	3			119
4	(Brazil) João Paulo Sanzovo	5	5	5	5	2	8	3	8	Ret	7	7	Ret						78
5	(Brazil) Elias Barbosa	6	6	6	8	Ret	9	7	7	2	5	6	7	7†	7	5			72
6	(Brazil) Fabricio Fogaça	7	DSQ	Ret							**1**	2	1	**1**	5	**1**			71
7	(Brazil) Luiz Queiroz							9	4	4	3	3	3	5	1	7			62
8	(Argentina) Gianni Giovanelli	Ret	4	DSQ	6	7	5	Ret	5	5	Ret	Ret	4	4	2	4			56
9	(Brazil) Alan Soloviov	Ret	7	2				8	3	Ret	4	4	Ret	6	6	6			54
10	(Brazil) Alexandre Louza	3	8†	8	Ret	6	Ret	5	11†	DSQ	6	5	DSQ	3	3	8			48
11	(Brazil) Naim Saleh				9	5	2	6	2	**DSQ**				Ret	8	2			46
12	(Argentina) Franco Paolini				7	Ret	7	Ret	6	3	8	9	5	Ret	9	9			45
13	(Brazil) Guilherme Moleiro				4	1	6												35
14	(Brazil) Rodrigo Rocha	Ret	Ret	7															6
–	(Brazil) Pedro Paulo Bartelle																		–
–	(Brazil) Gustavo Delgado																		–

=== Teams' championship ===
Each team acquired the points earned by their two best drivers in each race.

Pos	Team	INT1			MGG			INT2			BRS			INT3			INT4	INT5	Pts
1	TMG Racing	**1**	1	**1**	4	3	2	2	1	2	2	1	**2**	2	2	2			337
1	TMG Racing	2	6	4	5	4	4	4	3	8	4	3	4	3	3	3			337
2	Cavaleiro Sports	8	2	3	**1**	2	**1**	**1**	2	**1**	1	2	1	**1**	1	**1**			324
2	Cavaleiro Sports	10	11	9	3	6	3	7	6	4	3	4	3	5	4	4			324
3	Starrett Bassani	3	3	2	2	1	6	3	4	3	5	5	7	4	5	5			220
3	Starrett Bassani	5	4	5	6	7	7	6	5	5	9	10	9	13†	12	6			220
