= Sebastian Bach (racing driver) =

Danish racing driver (born 2008)

- Nationality: (Denmark) Danish
- Born: Sebastian Kirch Bach; 4 June 2008 (age 18) Aalborg, Denmark

Le Mans Cup career
- Debut season: 2026
- Current team: Forestier Racing by VPS
- Categorisation: FIA Silver
- Car number: 92
- Starts: 6
- Wins: 0
- Podiums: 0
- Poles: 0
- Fastest laps: 0
- Best finish: 6th in 2026

Championship titles
- 2025: Nordic Championship Formula
- Statistics up to date as of 27 August 2026.

Sebastian Kirch Bach (born 4 June 2008) is a Danish racing driver who last competed in the LMP3 class of the Le Mans Cup for Forestier Racing by VPS.

== Personal life ==
Bach is the son of Kenn Bach, a former racing driver who competed in TCR Denmark from 2020 to 2022.

== Career ==
Bach began karting at the age of ten, competing until 2023. Racing mainly in Europe in his karting career, he most notably was the Danish Rotax Max champion in 2021 and 2022 in the Mini and Junior classes respectively. Bach also partook in the Rotax Max Challenge Grand Finals three times, scoring a best result of ninth in 2023 whilst racing in the E20 Senior Max class.

In 2024, Bach made his single-seater debut in the newly rebranded Nordic 4 Championship for STEP Motorsport. In his maiden season in the series, Bach scored his only win of the season in the second round at Jyllands-Ringen and took six more podiums to secure fourth in the overall standings and also secured the rookie title.

The following year, Bach returned to Formula 4 competition, joining AS Motorsport to contest the first three rounds of the Formula Winter Series, in which he scored points twice by finishing ninth in race two at Algarve and tenth in race three at Aragón. For the rest of 2025, Bach returned to STEP Motorsport for his sophomore year in Nordic 4, winning at Padborg Park and Jyllands-Ringen, to secure runner-up honors in the Danish standings. Despite losing the title to Marius Kristiansen by seven points in the former, Bach won the Nordic Championship Formula title, held in conjunction with Formula Nordic, after winning all three races at Falkenbergs Motorbana earlier in the year.

During 2025, Bach also made his sportscar debut in Ligier JS Cup France, in which he competed in four races for Loire Valley Racing. At the end of the year, Bach took part in the European Le Mans Series rookie tests, sampling LMP3 machinery for the first time with CLX Motorsport. The following year, Bach joined Forestier Racing by VPS to race in the LMP3 class of the Le Mans Cup. In his first season in LMP3 competition, Bach took a best result of fourth at Spa to end the year sixth in points. Towards the end of the year, Bach partook in the European Le Mans Series rookie tests in R-ace GP's Duqueine D09.

== Karting record ==
=== Karting career summary ===
Season	Series	Team	Position
2021	RMC Grand Finals - Mini Max	RS Competition	14th
2022	Rotax Max Challenge Denmark - Junior Max		1st
2022	Rotax Max Euro Trophy - Junior Max	RS Competition	42nd
2022	RMC Grand Finals - Junior Max	RS Competition	47th
2023	Rotax Max Euro Trophy - Senior Max	RS Competition	32nd
2023	BNL Kart Series - Senior Max	RS Competition	30th
2023	RMC Grand Finals - E20 Senior Max	RS Competition	9th

== Racing record ==
=== Racing career summary ===
Season	Series	Team	Races	Wins	Poles	F/Laps	Podiums	Points	Position
2024	Nordic 4 Championship	STEP Motorsport	15	1	0	0	7	263	4th
2025	Formula Winter Series	AS Motorsport	9	0	0	0	0	3	20th
2025	Ligier JS Cup France	TMP by LVR	4	0	0	1	0	321‡	20th‡
2025	Nordic 4 Championship	STEP Motorsport	18	2	1	1	12	275	**2nd**
2025	Nordic Championship Formula	STEP Motorsport	18	5	0	0	13	279	**1st**
2026	Le Mans Cup – LMP3	Forestier Racing by VPS	6	0	0	0	0	45	6th

^{‡} Team standings

=== Complete Nordic 4 Championship results ===
(key) (Races in bold indicate pole position) (Races in italics indicate fastest lap)

Year	Team	1	2	3	4	5	6	7	8	9	10	11	12	13	14	15	16	17	18	19	20	21	DC	Points
2024	STEP Motorsport	PAD1; 1; 4	PAD1; 2; 8	PAD1; 3; 5	JYL1; 1; 1	JYL1; 2; 5	JYL1; 3; 3	KAR; 1; 5	KAR; 2; 5	KAR; 3; 4	DJU; 1; 6	DJU; 2; 6	DJU; 3; 4	FAL; 1; 7	FAL; 2; 2	FAL; 3; 3	PAD2; 1; 5	PAD2; 2; 2	PAD2; 3; 2	JYL2; 1; 5	JYL2; 2; 2	JYL2; 3; 4	4th	263
2025	STEP Motorsport	**PAD1**; **1**; 1	PAD1; 2; 4	PAD1; 3; 2	AND; 1; 4	AND; 2; 2	AND; 3; 2	**DJU**; **1**; 2	DJU; 2; 3	DJU; 3; 3	JYL1; 1; 2	JYL1; 2 Ret	JYL1; 3; 4	**PAD2**; **1**; 4	PAD2; 2; 2	PAD2; 3; 2	JYL2; 1; 1	JYL2; 2; 7	JYL2; 3; 3				2nd	275

=== Complete Formula Winter Series results ===
(key) (Races in bold indicate pole position) (Races in italics indicate fastest lap)

Year	Team	1	2	3	4	5	6	7	8	9	10	11	12	DC	Points
2025	AS Motorsport	POR; 1; 18	POR; 2; 9	POR; 3; 16	CRT; 1; 12	CRT; 2; 22	CRT; 3 Ret	ARA; 1 Ret	ARA; 2; 12	ARA; 3; 10	CAT; 1	CAT; 2	CAT; 3	20th	3

=== Complete Le Mans Cup results ===
(key) (Races in bold indicate pole position; results in italics indicate fastest lap)

Year	Entrant	Class	Chassis	1	2	3	4	5	6	Rank	Points
2026	Forestier Racing by VPS	LMP3	Ligier JS P325	BAR; 8	LEC; 5	LMS; 7	SPA; 4	SIL; 13	POR; 5	6th	45

^{*} Season still in progress.
