= Ljungbyheds Motorbana =

Motor racing track in Skåne County, Sweden

- Location: Ljungbyhed, Skåne County, Sweden
- Coordinates: 56°5′4.93″N 13°13′20.21″E
- Opened: 12 June 2016; 10 years ago
- Major events: Current: Radical Cup Scandinavia (2019–2022, 2024–present); Future: Scandinavian Touring Car Championship (2021–2022, 2024, 2027)

Course 1 (2016–present)
- Length: 2.100 km (1.305 mi)
- Turns: 10

Course 2 (2016–present)
- Length: 2.020 km (1.255 mi)
- Turns: 10
- Race lap record: 0:45.111 ( (Norway) Jonathan Lykke Nessjøen, Yamaha YZF-R1, 2022, SBK)

Course 3 (2016–present)
- Length: 1.400 km (0.870 mi)
- Turns: 7

Ljungbyheds Motorbana is a 2.100 km (1.305 mi) motorsports circuit located on the 1.4 km (0.87 mi) northwest of Ljungbyhed, Sweden. Like Drivecenter Arena, the circuit was converted from the former military airfield of Swedish Air Force, Swedish Air Force Flying School.

Before opening for motorsports purposes on 12 June 2016, the circuit area was used for driving education purposes from 2007. The circuit hosts national events such as Scandinavian Touring Car Championship, Radical Cup Scandinavia and Pro Superbike events.

== Lap records ==
As of June 2025, the fastest official race lap records at the Ljungbyheds Motorbana are listed as:

Category	Time	Driver	Vehicle	Event
Course 2 (2016–present): 2.020 km (1.255 mi)
Superbike	0:45.111	Jonathan Lykke Nessjøen	Yamaha YZF-R1	2022 Ljungbyhed Pro Superbike round
Radical Cup	0:49.886	Noah Degnbol	Radical SR3	2022 Ljungbyhed Radical Cup Scandinavia round
TCR Touring Car	0:52.065	Robert Dahlgren	CUPRA León Competición TCR	2022 Ljungbyhed STCC round
Formula Renault 1.6	0:52.444	Melvin Kalousdian	Signatech FR1.6	2025 Ljungbyhed Formula Nordic round
STCC Electric Car	0:56.588	Mikael Karlsson	Tesla Model 3 ETCR	2024 Ljungbyhed STCC round
