= 2025 Porsche Carrera Cup Scandinavia =

Motor racing championship

The 2025 Porsche Carrera Cup Scandinavia was the 22nd season of the Porsche Carrera Cup Scandinavia. It began on 9 May at Anderstorp Raceway and ended on 20 September at Mantorp Park. The championship was made up of the Porsche 911 GT3 Cup (Type 992) with two classes for drivers, Overall and Pro-Am.

== Calendar ==
Round	Circuit	Date
1	Anderstorp Raceway, Anderstorp, Sweden	May 9–10
2	Drivecenter Arena, Fällfors, Sweden	June 13–14
3	Jyllands-Ringen, Silkeborg, Denmark	June 28–29
4	Karlskoga Motorstadion, Karlskoga, Sweden	August 15–16
5	Rudskogen, Rakkestad, Norway	September 5–6
6	Mantorp Park, Mantorp, Sweden	September 19–20

== Entry list ==
Team	No.	Drivers	Class	Rounds
(Sweden) M3G Motorsport	2	(Sweden) Marcus Annervi		1–4
(Sweden) M3G Motorsport	3	(Sweden) Johan Kristoffersson		2–3
(Sweden) M3G Motorsport	17	(Sweden) Gustav Bergström		1, 4–6
(Sweden) M3G Motorsport	93	(Sweden) Sebastian Eriksson	G	6
(Sweden) Stenhaga Motorsport	4	(Sweden) Theo Jernberg		All
(Sweden) Stenhaga Motorsport	43	(Sweden) Anders Steiner	PA	1, 4–6
(Sweden) Stenhaga Motorsport	44	(Sweden) Svante Andersson	PA	1, 4–6
(Sweden) Stenhaga Motorsport	96	(Sweden) Ludwig Ellhage	PA	All
(Sweden) Fragus Motorsport	5	(Sweden) William Siverholm		All
(Sweden) Fragus Motorsport	14	(Sweden) Daniel Ros		All
(Sweden) Fragus Motorsport	46	(Sweden) Wilmer Wallenstam		All
(Sweden) Fragus Motorsport	94	(United Kingdom) Mat Armstrong	G	6
(Sweden) Fragus Motorsport	113	(Norway) Isabell Rustad		All
(Sweden) Micke Kågered Racing	7	(Sweden) Emil Persson		All
(Sweden) Micke Kågered Racing	21	(Sweden) Kjelle Lejonkrans	PA	All
(Sweden) Micke Kågered Racing	22	(Sweden) Albin Wärnelöv	PA	1–3, 5–6
(Sweden) Mtech Competition	9	(Sweden) Thomas Karlsson	G	6
(Sweden) Mtech Competition	42	(Sweden) Christoffer Bergström	PA	2
(Sweden) Mtech Competition	69	(Denmark) Gustav Krogh		All
(Germany) Porsche Experience Racing	13	(Sweden) Carl Phillip Bernadotte	PA	1, 4, 6
(Germany) Porsche Experience Racing	911	(Denmark) Ole Petersen	G	1, 3
(Germany) Porsche Experience Racing	911	(Norway) Dennis Hauger	G	5

Icon	Class
PA	Pro-Am Cup
G	Guest

== Race results ==
Round		Circuit	Pole position	Fastest lap	Winning driver	Winning team	Pro-Am winner
1	R1	(Sweden) Anderstorp Raceway	(Sweden) William Siverholm	(Sweden) William Siverholm	(Sweden) William Siverholm	(Sweden) Fragus Motorsport	(Sweden) Kjelle Lejonkrans
1	R2	(Sweden) Anderstorp Raceway	(Sweden) Gustav Bergström	(Sweden) William Siverholm	(Sweden) Gustav Bergström (Note: William Siverholm originally won the race, but later received a 5-second time penalty for a restart infringement. Gustav Bergström, initially classified second, thus inherited the win.)	(Sweden) M3G Motorsport	(Sweden) Albin Wärnelöv
2	R1	(Sweden) Drivecenter Arena	(Sweden) Daniel Ros	(Sweden) Daniel Ros	(Sweden) Daniel Ros	(Sweden) Fragus Motorsport	(Sweden) Albin Wärnelöv
2	R2	(Sweden) Drivecenter Arena	(Sweden) Marcus Annervi	(Sweden) Daniel Ros	(Sweden) Marcus Annervi	(Sweden) M3G Motorsport	(Sweden) Albin Wärnelöv
3	R1	(Denmark) Jyllands-Ringen	(Sweden) Johan Kristoffersson	(Sweden) Johan Kristoffersson	(Sweden) Emil Persson	(Sweden) Micke Kågered Racing	(Sweden) Albin Wärnelöv
3	R2	(Denmark) Jyllands-Ringen	(Sweden) Daniel Ros	(Sweden) Daniel Ros	(Sweden) Daniel Ros	(Sweden) Fragus Motorsport	(Sweden) Kjelle Lejonkrans
4	R1	(Sweden) Karlskoga Motorstadion	(Sweden) William Siverholm	(Sweden) William Siverholm	(Sweden) Daniel Ros	(Sweden) Fragus Motorsport	(Sweden) Kjelle Lejonkrans
4	R2	(Sweden) Karlskoga Motorstadion	(Sweden) Daniel Ros	(Sweden) Daniel Ros	(Sweden) Daniel Ros	(Sweden) Fragus Motorsport	(Sweden) Kjelle Lejonkrans
5	R1	(Norway) Rudskogen	(Norway) Dennis Hauger	(Norway) Dennis Hauger	(Norway) Dennis Hauger	(Germany) Porsche Experience Racing	(Sweden) Kjelle Lejonkrans
5	R2	(Norway) Rudskogen	(Norway) Dennis Hauger	(Norway) Dennis Hauger	(Norway) Dennis Hauger	(Germany) Porsche Experience Racing	(Sweden) Kjelle Lejonkrans
6	R1	(Sweden) Mantorp Park	(Sweden) William Siverholm	(Sweden) Daniel Ros	(Sweden) Daniel Ros	(Sweden) Fragus Motorsport	(Sweden) Albin Wärnelöv
6	R2	(Sweden) Mantorp Park	(Sweden) William Siverholm	(Sweden) Daniel Ros	(Sweden) William Siverholm	(Sweden) Fragus Motorsport	(Sweden) Albin Wärnelöv

== Championship standings ==
=== Points system ===
Championship points are awarded in each class at the finish of each event. Points are awarded based on finishing positions in the race as shown in the chart below.

Position	**1st**	**2nd**	**3rd**	**4th**	**5th**	**6th**	**7th**	**8th**	**9th**	**10th**	**11th**	**12th**	**13th**	**14th**	**15th**	Pole	FL
Points	25	20	17	14	12	10	9	8	7	6	5	4	3	2	1	1	1

=== Drivers' Championship ===
Pos	Driver	AND (Sweden)		SKE (Sweden)		JYL (Denmark)		KAR (Sweden)		RUD (Norway)		MAN (Sweden)		Pts
Pos	Driver	R1	R2	R1	R2	R1	R2	R1	R2	R1	R2	R1	R2	Pts
Overall
1	(Sweden) Daniel Ros	4	9	**1**	4	3	**1**	1	**1**	5	3	1	2	240
2	(Sweden) William Siverholm	**1**	3	2	5	5	DNS	**2**	3	4	4	**2**	**1**	212
3	(Sweden) Emil Persson	3	2	6	13	1	3	4	4	2	2	5	4	197
4	(Denmark) Gustav Krogh	8	Ret	3	3	4	2	5	5	3	5	3	6	161
5	(Sweden) Gustav Bergström	5	**1**					3	2	6	6	6	3	126
6	(Norway) Isabell Rustad	7	7	7	6	8	7	10	7	7	11	4	10	108
7	(Sweden) Marcus Annervi	2	Ret	4	**1**	7	4	8	6					102
8	(Sweden) Wilmer Wallenstam	12	4	Ret	7	10	8	6	13	9	10	8	5	92
9	(Sweden) Albin Wärnelöv	9	5	8	8	9	11	9	9	12	9	10	9	91
10	(Sweden) Kjelle Lejonkrans	6	6	11	9	12	10	7	8	10	7	11	12	89
11	(Sweden) Theo Jernberg	10	8	9	10	11	9	11	10	8	8	7	7	88
12	(Sweden) Johan Kristoffersson			5	2	**2**	6							66
13	(Sweden) Ludwig Ellhage	Ret	10	12	12	13	12	14	15	13	14	17	16	37
14	(Sweden) Svante Andersson	13	12					13	11	11	12	14	14	35
15	(Sweden) Anders Steiner	14	11					15	14	14	13	15	15	24
16	(Sweden) Carl Phillip Bernadotte	DNS	DNS					12	12			13	11	19
17	(Sweden) Christoffer Bergström			10	11									11
Guest drivers ineligible for points
—	(Norway) Dennis Hauger									**1** (Note: Dennis Hauger took the overall pole position and set the fastest lap in race 1 at Rudskogen, but he was ineligible to score points due to competing as a guest driver. As a result, the pole position point was awarded to William Siverholm and the fastest lap point was awarded to Emil Persson.)	**1** (Note: Dennis Hauger took the overall pole position and set the fastest lap in race 2 at Rudskogen, but he was ineligible to score points due to competing as a guest driver. As a result, both the pole position point and the fastest lap point were awarded to William Siverholm.)			–
—	(Denmark) Ole Petersen	11	Ret			6	5							–
—	(Sweden) Sebastian Eriksson											9	8	–
—	(Sweden) Thomas Karlsson											12	EX	–
—	(United Kingdom) Mat Armstrong											16	13	–
Pro-Am
1	(Sweden) Albin Wärnelöv	2	1	1	1	1	2	2	2	3	2	1	1	267
2	(Sweden) Kjelle Lejonkrans	1	2	3	2	2	1	1	1	1	1	2	3	264
3	(Sweden) Ludwig Ellhage	Ret	3	4	4	3	3	5	6	4	5	6	6	147
4	(Sweden) Svante Andersson	3	5					4	3	2	3	4	4	125
5	(Sweden) Anders Steiner	4	4					6	5	5	4	5	5	100
6	(Sweden) Carl Phillip Bernadotte	DNS	DNS					3	4			3	2	68
7	(Sweden) Christoffer Bergström			2	3									37
Pos	Driver	R1	R2	R1	R2	R1	R2	R1	R2	R1	R2	R1	R2	Pts
Pos	Driver	AND (Sweden)		SKE (Sweden)		JYL (Denmark)		KAR (Sweden)		RUD (Norway)		MAN (Sweden)		Pts

Colour	Result
Gold	Winner
Silver	Second place
Bronze	Third place
Green	Points classification
Blue	Non-points classification
Blue	Non-classified finish (NC)
Purple	Retired, not classified (Ret)
Red	Did not qualify (DNQ)
Red	Did not pre-qualify (DNPQ)
Black	Disqualified (DSQ)
White	Did not start (DNS)
White	Withdrew (WD)
White	Race cancelled (C)
Blank	Did not practice (DNP)
Blank	Did not arrive (DNA)
Blank	Excluded (EX)

**Bold** – Pole
Italics – Fastest Lap

=== Teams' Championship ===
Pos	Team	Pts
1	(Sweden) Fragus Motorsport	450
2	(Sweden) M3G Motorsport	305
3	(Sweden) Micke Kågered Racing	300
4	(Sweden) Mtech Competition	176
5	(Sweden) Stenhaga Motorsport	138
6	(Germany) Porsche Experience Racing	16
