= Michel Nykjær =

Danish racing driver

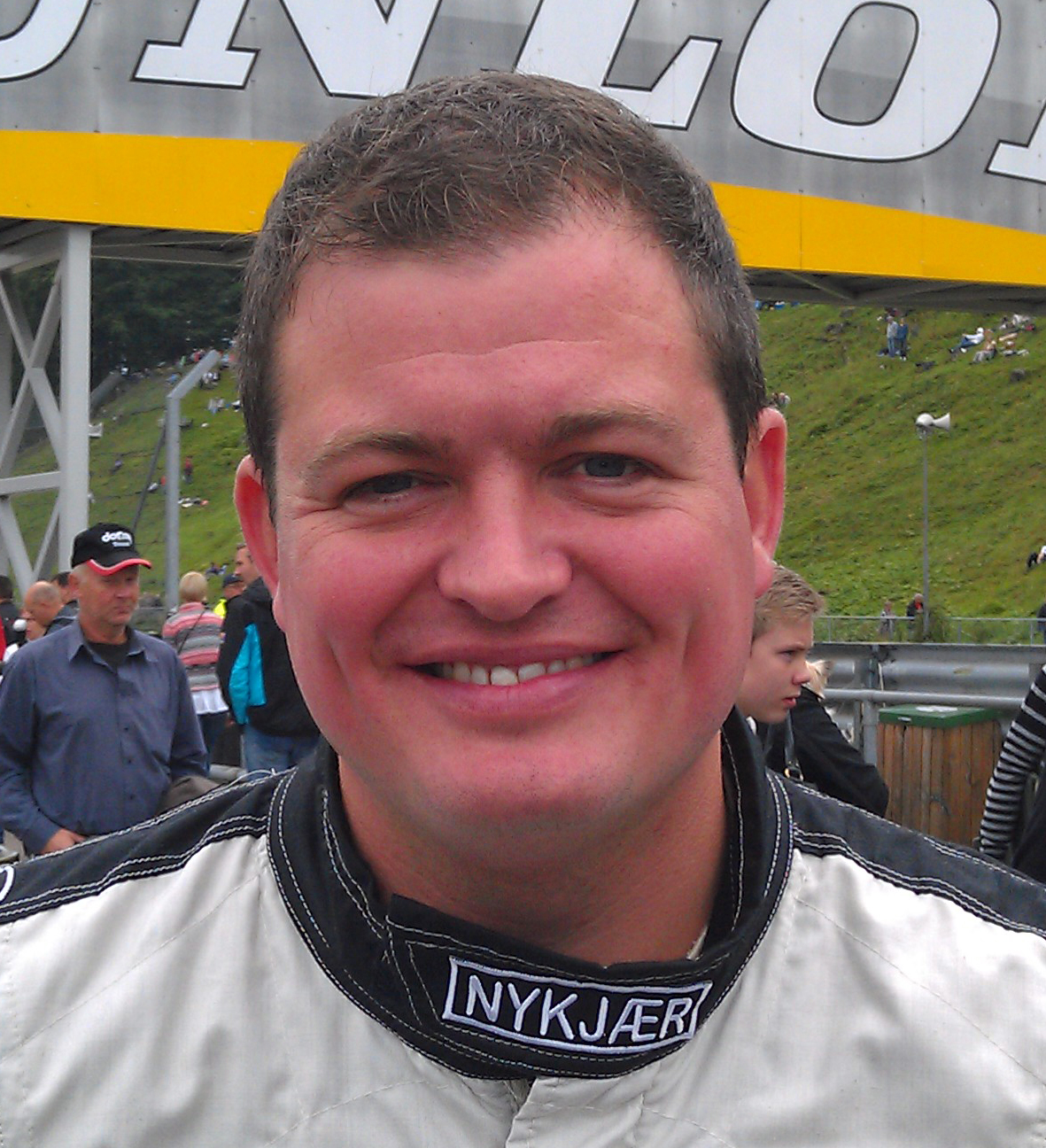
- Michel Nykjær in 2011.
- Nationality: Danish
- Born: 17 September 1979 (age 47) Tappernøje (Denmark)
- Car number: 17
- Starts: 38
- Wins: 3
- Poles: 0
- Fastest laps: 0

Previous series
- 2009–2013 2011–2012 2005–2011 2003–2009 1998–2002: World Touring Car Championship; STCC; ETCC; Danish Touring Car Championship; Danish Group N Championship

Championship titles
- 2007, 2009 2007–2008: Danish Touring Car Championship; ETCC

Michel Nykjær (born 17 September 1979) is a Danish auto racing driver. Nykjær is a two-time European Touring Car Cup winner.

== Career ==
=== Early years ===
Between 1989 and 1993, Nykjær spent his early racing years in karting. After a break, he returned to motorsport in 1998, with saloon cars in the Danish Group N Championship. He stepped up to the Danish Touring Car Championship in 2003, and was crowned champion in 2007 for SEAT Racing Team, in a SEAT Leon. Also in 2007, he won the European Touring Car Cup for the GR Asia Team.

In 2008, Nykjær moved to the Poulsen Motorsport Team in a BMW for another season in the DTC. He defended his ETC Cup title in 2008 for Chevrolet Motorsport Denmark in a Chevrolet Lacetti.

=== World Touring Car Championship ===
==== Perfection Racing (2009) ====
For 2009, Nykjær was supposed to compete in the World Touring Car Championship for the Poulsen Motorsport Team in a BMW 320si but Poulsen chose to run his car for Engstler Motorsport and Nykjær was forced to remain in the DTC where he retained his title. However, he raced the WTCC round at Oschersleben for Perfection Racing. He attended the 2009 European Touring Car Cup, but lost his crown to James Thompson.

==== SUNRED Engineering (2010–2011) ====
In 2010, Nykjær raced for SUNRED Engineering in the WTCC in a SEAT León 2.0 TDI. He made it into the second part of qualifying for the Race of Morocco when he crashed at turn ten and brought the session to a premature end, his best time put him sixth on the grid. In race one he was battling with Jordi Gené but ran wide and dropped down the field, finishing just outside the points in eleventh. He started on pole position for race two of the Race of Italy and was initially passed by Gabriele Tarquini who was then issued with a drive-through penalty. Before Tarquini could serve the penalty, Nykjær re-passed him and led until the final lap of the race he suffered a puncture and pulled off the track, handing the victory to Yvan Muller. In race one of the Race of Belgium, he made contact with the bamboo-engineering car of Darryl O'Young which left O'Young in the gravel trap while Nykjær finished eighteenth. He failed to make it through to the second part of qualifying for the Race of Portugal and then ran wide when battling with Norbert Michelisz for seventh place in race one. Nykjær was bumped off the circuit by Tiago Monteiro in race two of the Race of Germany, Monteiro was penalised and Nykjær went on to finish fourth. He started on pole position for race two of the Race of Japan and led until lap nine when he slid off in the wet conditions, eventually finished seventh. He was caught up in a first lap incident at the Race of Macau which was originally between Andy Priaulx and André Couto, ending his race on the first lap. He finished the second race of the day in eleventh place and finished the season 12th in the drivers' championship.

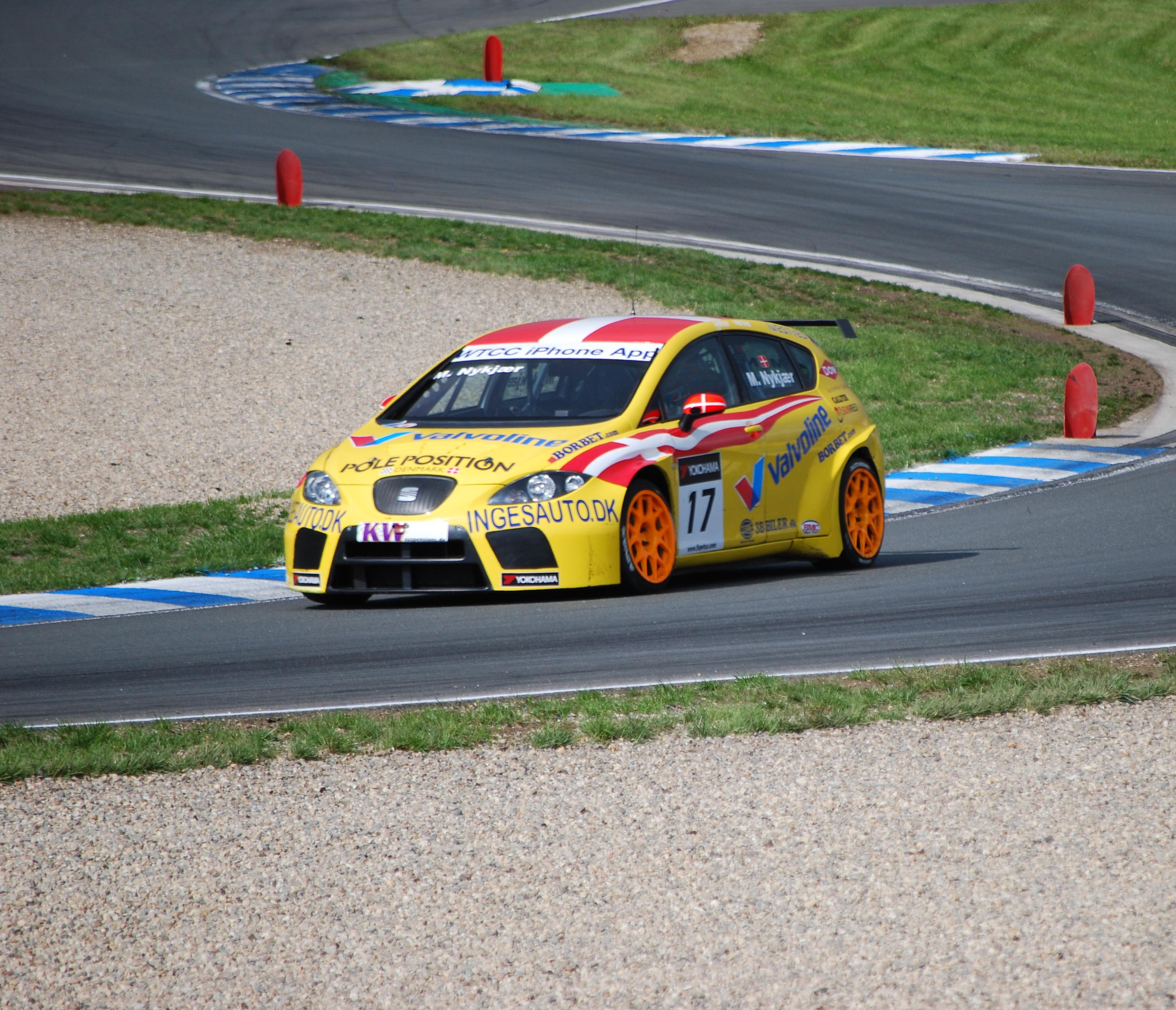
Nykjær driving for SUNRED Engineering at the 2010 FIA WTCC Race of Germany.

Nykjær continued in the WTCC with SUNRED for 2011. In race two of the Race of Brazil he collided with Kristian Poulsen while the two were fighting over the lead of the independents' category. He qualified in 20th place for the Race of Belgium having not set a time. He had clipped one of the barriers at the chicane and was unable to continue in the session due to damage. He scored points in both races, finished fifth in the second race of the day. Having started the season with the TDI engine, Nykjær switched to the new SUNRED 1.6T engine for the Race of Hungary. The engine change did not yield any points until the following round where Nykjær finished tenth having collided at the first corner in race one. He then started on pole position for race two but was passed by Tom Coronel at the start and then Yvan Muller. By the end of the race, he had dropped down to fourth but he still took the independents' victory. He started second for race two of the Race of UK at Donington Park but ended his race on the first lap when he became stuck in the gravel trap at Coppice. He qualified in seventh place for race one of the Race of Japan, on the opening lap he tagged the Volvo of Robert Dahlgren. He was running fourth in the later stages of the race when Muller made a mistake and dropped behind him, giving Nykjær his first overall podium result in the WTCC and the independents' victory. He was the winning independent again in race two when he finished sixth. He didn't score any points in China, crashing out two laps from the end of race one and finished fourteenth in race two. He qualified ahead of most of his rivals for the independents' trophy at the Race of Macau, finishing fifth and claiming the independents' victory in both races. He finished the season second in the Yokohama Drivers' Trophy, two points behind Kristian Poulsen.

==== Bamboo Engineering (2012) ====
Nykjær was brought in to substitute for Pasquale di Sabatino at bamboo-engineering for the 2012 FIA WTCC Race of Brazil. He qualified fourth for race one and took the independents' victory in race one by finishing fifth.

==== NIKA Racing (2013) ====
Nykjær returned to the WTCC full-time in 2013, driving for NIKA Racing. He dropped out of race one of the Race of Italy early on with driveshaft problems but finished second in race two from third on the grid to take the team's first podium finish in the WTCC. He claimed his first overall victory in the WTCC in race one of the Race of Morocco having started from fourth on the grid. In the week leading up to the 2013 FIA WTCC Race of Japan, he left the team citing financial reasons.

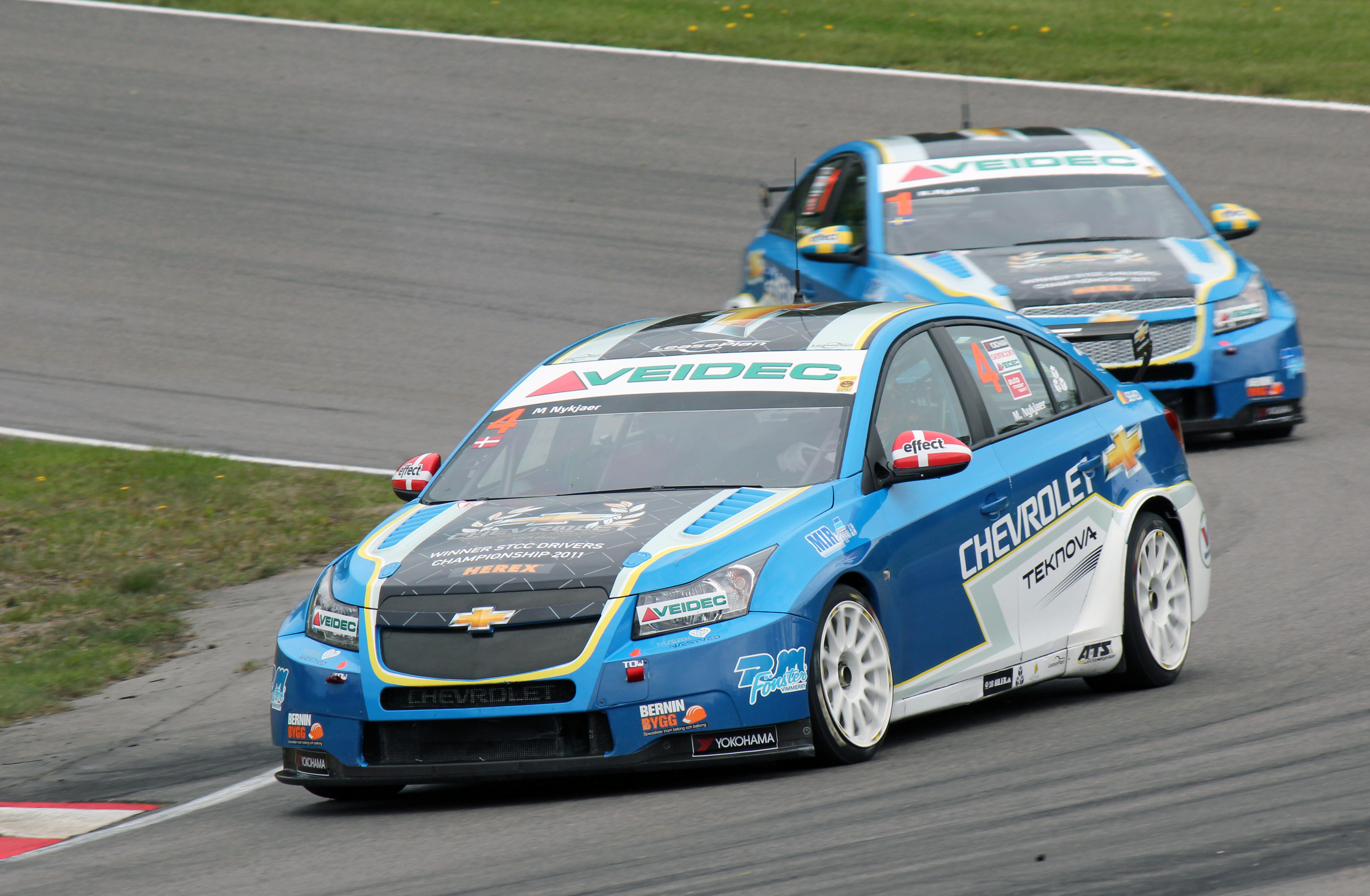
Michel Nykjær on Ring Knutstorp in Scandinavian Touring Car Championship 2012.

=== Scandinavian Touring Car Championship ===
==== Chevrolet Motorsport Sweden (2011–2012) ====
In 2012, Nykjær was frontrunner in Scandinavian Touring Car Championship, STCC

== Racing record ==
=== Complete World Touring Car Championship results ===
(key) (Races in bold indicate pole position) (Races in italics indicate fastest lap)

Year	Team	Car	1	2	3	4	5	6	7	8	9	10	11	12	13	14	15	16	17	18	19	20	21	22	23	24	DC	Points
2009	Perfection Racing	Chevrolet Lacetti	BRA; 1	BRA; 2	MEX; 1	MEX; 2	MAR; 1	MAR; 2	FRA; 1	FRA; 2	ESP; 1	ESP; 2	CZE; 1	CZE; 2	POR; 1	POR; 2	GBR; 1	GBR; 2	GER; 1 NC	GER; 2; 18	ITA; 1	ITA; 2	JPN; 1	JPN; 2	MAC; 1	MAC; 2	36th	0
2010	SUNRED Engineering	SEAT León 2.0 TDI	BRA; 1; 12	BRA; 2; 8	MAR; 1; 11	MAR; 2; 7	ITA; 1; 8	**ITA**; **2**; 19	BEL; 1; 18	BEL; 2 Ret	POR; 1; 17	POR; 2 Ret	GBR; 1; 15	GBR; 2; 9	CZE; 1; 7	CZE; 2 Ret	GER; 1; 7	GER; 2; 4	ESP; 1; 9	ESP; 2; 7	JPN; 1; 6	JPN; 2; 6	MAC; 1 Ret	MAC; 2; 11			12th	66
2011	SUNRED Engineering	SEAT León 2.0 TDI	BRA; 1; 8	BRA; 2 Ret	BEL; 1; 8	BEL; 2; 5	ITA; 1; 12	ITA; 2 Ret																			10th	86
2011	SUNRED Engineering	SUNRED SR León 1.6T							HUN; 1; 13	HUN; 2 Ret	CZE; 1; 10	**CZE**; **2**; 5	POR; 1; 9	POR; 2; 12	GBR; 1; 7	GBR; 2 Ret	GER; 1; 7	GER; 2; 17	ESP; 1; 11	ESP; 2; 15	JPN; 1; 3	JPN; 2; 6	CHN; 1; 14	CHN; 2; 14	MAC; 1; 5	MAC; 2; 5	10th	86
2012	bamboo-engineering	Chevrolet Cruze 1.6T	ITA; 1	ITA; 2	ESP; 1	ESP; 2	MAR; 1	MAR; 2	SVK; 1	SVK; 2	HUN; 1	HUN; 2	AUT; 1	AUT; 2	POR; 1	POR; 2	BRA; 1; 5	BRA; 2; 4	USA; 1	USA; 2	JPN; 1	JPN; 2	CHN; 1	CHN; 2	MAC; 1	MAC; 2	16th	20
2013	NIKA Racing	Chevrolet Cruze 1.6T	ITA; 1; 20	ITA; 2; 2	MAR; 1; 1	MAR; 2; 7	SVK; 1; 7	SVK; 2; 12	HUN; 1; 10	HUN; 2; 9	**AUT**; **1**; 1	AUT; 2; 5	RUS; 1; 7	RUS; 2; 1	POR; 1; 3	POR; 2; 3	ARG; 1; 6	ARG; 2; 4	USA; 1; 12	USA; 2; 17	JPN; 1	JPN; 2	CHN; 1	CHN; 2	MAC; 1	MAC; 2	7th	180

=== Complete Scandinavian Touring Car Championship results ===
(key) (Races in bold indicate pole position) (Races in italics indicate fastest lap)

Year	Team	Car	1	2	3	4	5	6	7	8	9	10	11	12	13	14	15	16	17	18	DC	Points
2011	Chevrolet Motorsport Sweden	Chevrolet Cruze	JYL; 1	JYL; 2	KNU; 1	KNU; 2	MAN; 1	MAN; 2	GÖT; 1	GÖT; 2	FAL; 1	FAL; 2	KAR; 1	KAR; 2	JYL; 1	JYL; 2	KNU; 1; 4	KNU; 2; 15	MAN; 1; 5	MAN; 2; 18	18th	22
2012	Chevrolet Motorsport Sweden	Chevrolet Cruze	MAN; 1; 6	MAN; 2; 4	KNU; 1 Ret	**KNU**; **2**; 1	STU; 1; 4	**STU**; **2**; 1	MAN; 1; 4	**MAN**; **2**; 1	ÖST; 1; 5	ÖST; 2; 5	**JYL**; **1**; 1	JYL; 2; 2	**KNU**; **1**; 1	KNU; 2; 2	SOL; 1; 9	SOL; 2; 8			**3rd**	**231**

=== Complete TCR International Series results ===
(key) (Races in bold indicate pole position) (Races in italics indicate fastest lap)

Year	Team	Car	1	2	3	4	5	6	7	8	9	10	11	12	13	14	15	16	17	18	19	20	21	22	DC	Points
2015	Target Competition	SEAT León Cup Racer	MYS; 1; 8	MYS; 2 Ret	CHN; 1; 9	CHN; 2; 5	ESP; 1; 7	ESP; 2; 2	POR; 1 Ret	POR; 2; 1	ITA; 1; 13†	ITA; 2 DNS	AUT; 1; 12†	AUT; 2; 1	RUS; 1; 9	RUS; 2; 7	RBR; 1	RBR; 2	SIN; 1	SIN; 2	THA; 1	THA; 2	MAC; 1	MAC; 2	9th	100

^{†} Driver did not finish the race, but was classified as he completed over 90% of the race distance.

== Britcar 24 Hour results ==
Year	Team	Co-Drivers	Car	Car No.	Class	Laps	Pos.	Class Pos.
2010	(United Kingdom) JetAlliance Racing	(Austria) Vitus Eckert (Austria) Lukas Lichtner-Hoyer (United Kingdom) Martin Rich (Germany) Marco Seefried	Porsche 997	22	2	565	2nd	1st

Sporting positions
Preceded by Casper Elgaard	Danish Touring Car Champion; 2007	Succeeded by Jan Magnussen
Preceded by Ryan Sharp	European Touring Car Cup Champion; 2007, 2008	Succeeded by James Thompson
Preceded by Jan Magnussen	Danish Touring Car Champion; 2009	Succeeded by Casper Elgaard
