= 2016 Scandinavian Touring Car Championship =

The 2016 Scandinavian Touring Car Championship was the sixth Scandinavian Touring Car Championship season, and the twenty-first season of touring car racing in Sweden. The season started at Skövde Airport on May 1 and ended at Ring Knutstorp on September 24, after seven rounds. It was the fourth and final season that the STCC used "Solution F" touring car regulations, switching to TCR Touring Cars from 2017.

== Teams and drivers ==
All teams are Swedish-registered.

Team	Car	No.	Driver	Rounds
PWR Racing – SEAT Dealer Team	SEAT León STCC	3	(Sweden) Johan Kristoffersson	1–5, 7
PWR Racing – SEAT Dealer Team	SEAT León STCC	7	(Sweden) Philip Morin	6–7
PWR Racing – SEAT Dealer Team	SEAT León STCC	37	(Sweden) Daniel Haglöf	All
PWR Racing – SEAT Dealer Team	SEAT León STCC	77	(Finland) Emma Kimiläinen	1, 3–5
Flash Engineering	Saab 9-3	8	(Sweden) Björn Wirdheim	2–7
Flash Engineering	Saab 9-3	9	(Sweden) Reuben Kressner	All
Flash Engineering	Saab 9-3	24	(Sweden) Linus Ohlsson	1
Flash Engineering	Nissan SE	24	(Sweden) Linus Ohlsson	2–7
Polestar Cyan Racing	Volvo S60	11	(Sweden) Robert Dahlgren	All
Polestar Cyan Racing	Volvo S60	12	(Sweden) Richard Göransson	All
Polestar Cyan Racing	Volvo S60	13	(Sweden) Carl Philip Bernadotte	2–7
Polestar Cyan Racing	Volvo S60	33	(New Zealand) Scott McLaughlin	1
Dacia Dealer Team	Dacia SE	20	(Sweden) Mattias Andersson	All
Brovallen Design	Ford Mondeo BD Edition	28	(Sweden) Rasmus Mårthen	1–2, 4–6

== Calendar ==
=== Race calendar and results ===
All rounds were held in Sweden.

Round		Circuit	Location	Date	Pole position	Fastest lap	Race winner	Winning team
1	R1	Skövde Airport	Skövde, Västra Götaland	1 May	(Sweden) Robert Dahlgren	(New Zealand) Scott McLaughlin	(Sweden) Robert Dahlgren	Polestar Cyan Racing
1	R2	Skövde Airport	Skövde, Västra Götaland	1 May		(Sweden) Robert Dahlgren	(Sweden) Richard Göransson	Polestar Cyan Racing
2	R1	Mantorp Park	Mantorp, Östergötland	26 May	(Sweden) Richard Göransson	(Sweden) Richard Göransson	(Sweden) Richard Göransson	Polestar Cyan Racing
2	R2	Mantorp Park	Mantorp, Östergötland	26 May		(Sweden) Richard Göransson	(Sweden) Robert Dahlgren	Polestar Cyan Racing
3	R1	Anderstorp Raceway	Anderstorp, Jönköping	19 June	(Sweden) Johan Kristoffersson	(Sweden) Johan Kristoffersson	(Sweden) Johan Kristoffersson	PWR Racing – SEAT Dealer Team
3	R2	Anderstorp Raceway	Anderstorp, Jönköping	19 June		(Sweden) Björn Wirdheim	(Sweden) Daniel Haglöf	PWR Racing – SEAT Dealer Team
4	R1	Falkenbergs Motorbana	Bergagård, Halland	10 July	(Sweden) Richard Göransson	(Finland) Emma Kimiläinen	(Sweden) Richard Göransson	Polestar Cyan Racing
4	R2	Falkenbergs Motorbana	Bergagård, Halland	10 July		(Sweden) Richard Göransson	(Sweden) Richard Göransson	Polestar Cyan Racing
5	R1	Karlskoga Motorstadion	Karlskoga, Örebro	14 August	(Sweden) Robert Dahlgren	(Sweden) Robert Dahlgren	(Sweden) Robert Dahlgren	Polestar Cyan Racing
5	R2	Karlskoga Motorstadion	Karlskoga, Örebro	14 August		(Sweden) Robert Dahlgren	(Sweden) Björn Wirdheim	Flash Engineering
6	R1	Solvalla	Stockholm, Stockholm	3 September	(Sweden) Björn Wirdheim	(Sweden) Philip Morin	(Sweden) Daniel Haglöf	PWR Racing – SEAT Dealer Team
6	R2	Solvalla	Stockholm, Stockholm	3 September		(Sweden) Linus Ohlsson	(Sweden) Linus Ohlsson	Flash Engineering
7	R1	Ring Knutstorp	Kågeröd, Skåne	24 September	(Sweden) Johan Kristoffersson	(Sweden) Johan Kristoffersson	(Sweden) Johan Kristoffersson	PWR Racing – SEAT Dealer Team
7	R2	Ring Knutstorp	Kågeröd, Skåne	24 September		(Sweden) Robert Dahlgren	(Sweden) Mattias Andersson	Dacia Dealer Team

== Championship standings ==
=== Drivers' championship ===
Pos	Driver	SKÖ			MAN			AND			FAL			GEL			SOL			KNU			Pts
Pos	Driver	Q1	R1	R2	Q2	R3	R4	Q3	R5	R6	Q4	R7	R8	Q5	R9	R10	Q6	R11	R12	Q7	R13	R14	Pts
1	(Sweden) Richard Göransson	3	Ret	1	1	**1**	2	5	3	2	1	**1**	1	4	4	Ret	4	4	3	4	2	4	307
2	(Sweden) Robert Dahlgren	1	**1**	2	4	5	1	2	2	5	2	Ret	Ret	1	**1**	5	5	Ret	2	2	3	2	300
3	(Sweden) Johan Kristoffersson	8	4	5	2	3	Ret	1	**1**	3	3	2	5	2	EX	EX				1	**1**	6	243
4	(Sweden) Björn Wirdheim				3	2	4	4	5	4	5	4	Ret	6	5	1	1	**2**	Ret	7	4	3	220
5	(Sweden) Daniel Haglöf	5	Ret	6	5	4	3	6	6	1	11	5	Ret	7	3	3	2	1	Ret	3	5	7	206
6	(Sweden) Mattias Andersson	4	5	3	9	7	7	7	4	10	9	Ret	2	5	2	6	7	6	7	10	7	1	164
7	(Sweden) Linus Ohlsson	6	3	Ret	8	8	6	10	8	7	7	3	Ret	3	6	8†	10	Ret	1	6	8	Ret	125
8	(Sweden) Rasmus Mårthen	10	7	4	10	9	5				8	9	3	10	9	2	9	7	4				94
9	(Sweden) Reuben Kressner	9	6	Ret	6	Ret	DNS	8	7	8	10	7	Ret	8	8	4	6	5	Ret	9	9	5	84
10	(Sweden) Carl Philip Bernadotte				7	6	8	9	10	9	6	8	4	11	10	7	8	Ret	6	8	6	Ret	78
11	(Finland) Emma Kimiläinen	7	Ret	Ret				3	9	6	4	6	Ret	9	7	Ret							59
12	(Sweden) Philip Morin																3	3	5	5	DNS	Ret	50
13	(New Zealand) Scott McLaughlin	2	2	Ret																			36

Colour	Result
Gold	Winner
Silver	Second place
Bronze	Third place
Green	Points classification
Blue	Non-points classification
Blue	Non-classified finish (NC)
Purple	Retired, not classified (Ret)
Red	Did not qualify (DNQ)
Red	Did not pre-qualify (DNPQ)
Black	Disqualified (DSQ)
White	Did not start (DNS)
White	Withdrew (WD)
White	Race cancelled (C)
Blank	Did not practice (DNP)
Blank	Did not arrive (DNA)
Blank	Excluded (EX)

**Bold** – Pole
Italics – Fastest Lap

Notes:

- † — Drivers did not finish the race, but were classified as they completed over 70% of the race distance.

=== Teams' championship ===
Pos	Driver	SKÖ	MAN	AND	FAL	GEL	SOL	KNU	Pts
1	Polestar Cyan Racing	111	115	91	93	86	67	93	656
2	PWR Racing – SEAT Dealer Team	45	70	108	59	54	83	93	512
3	Flash Engineering	44	67	57	49	74	72	51	414
4	Dacia Dealer Team	42	20	26	24	38	26	39	215
5	Brovallen Design	24	18	0	31	28	26	0	127
