= 2012 Scandinavian Touring Car Championship =

Seasons
- ← 2011 2013 →

The 2012 Scandinavian Touring Car Championship season was the second Scandinavian Touring Car Championship season. The season started at Mantorp Park on 5 May and ended on 22 September at the brand new track at Solvalla in Stockholm. It would have been the first season to include cars built to the Next Generation Touring Car specification, but the plans ultimately fell through and no NGTC cars ever raced in Scandinavia.

== Teams and drivers ==
(Note: drivers with car numbers 88–99 are eligible for the Semcon cup). All teams were Swedish-registered.

| Team | Car | No. | Drivers | Rounds |
|---|---|---|---|---|
| Chevrolet Motorsport Sweden | Chevrolet Cruze 1.6T | 1 | (Sweden) Rickard Rydell | All |
| Chevrolet Motorsport Sweden | Chevrolet Cruze 1.6T | 4 | (Denmark) Michel Nykjær | All |
| Volkswagen Team Biogas | Volkswagen Scirocco^{1} | 2 | (Spain) Jordi Gené | All |
| Volkswagen Team Biogas | Volkswagen Scirocco^{1} | 3 | (Sweden) Johan Kristoffersson | All |
| IPS Team Biogas | Volkswagen Scirocco^{1} | 15 | (Sweden) Patrik Olsson | All |
| IPS Team Biogas | Volkswagen Scirocco^{1} | 21 | (Sweden) Johan Stureson | All |
| Honda Racing Sweden | Honda Civic | 17 | (Sweden) Tomas Engström | All |
| SEAT Sport Sweden | Seat León | 22 | (Sweden) Robin Appelqvist | All |
| SEAT Sport Sweden | Seat León | 23 | (Sweden) Santosh Berggren | All |
| MECA | Alfa Romeo 156 | 89 | (Sweden) Claes Hoffsten | 1 |
| NP Racing | Seat León 2.0 TFSI | 90 | (Sweden) Niclas Olsson | All |
| G-Rex Sweden | Mercedes-Benz C 200 | 91 | (Sweden) Tony Johansson | 2–8 |
| Memphis Racing | Opel Astra | 92 | (Sweden) André Andersson | 1–2 |
| Memphis Racing | BMW 320i | 92 | (Sweden) André Andersson | 3–8 |
| BMS Event | Audi A4 | 97 | (Sweden) Joakim Ahlberg | All |
| BMS Event | Audi A4 | 98 | (Sweden) Andreas Ahlberg | All |

Notes:

- ^1 — Volkswagen Team Biogas and IPS Team Biogas are using Biogas (CNG) 2.0-litre Turbo engines in their four Volkswagen Sciroccos.

== Race calendar ==
The provisional calendar was announced by the championship organisers on 15 October 2011. 2012 will see the inclusion of the brand new Sovalla track on the streets of Stockholm and a track at the Östersund airport.

| Round | | Circuit | Date | Pole position | Fastest lap | Winning driver | Winning team |
|---|---|---|---|---|---|---|---|
| 1 | R1 | (Sweden) Mantorp Park | 5 May | (Sweden) Johan Stureson | (Sweden) Rickard Rydell | (Sweden) Johan Kristoffersson | Volkswagen Team Biogas |
| 1 | R2 | (Sweden) Mantorp Park | 5 May | (Sweden) Johan Kristoffersson | (Sweden) Rickard Rydell | (Sweden) Johan Kristoffersson | Volkswagen Team Biogas |
| 2 | R3 | (Sweden) Ring Knutstorp | 19 May | (Sweden) Rickard Rydell | (Sweden) Rickard Rydell | (Sweden) Rickard Rydell | Chevrolet Motorsport Sweden |
| 2 | R4 | (Sweden) Ring Knutstorp | 19 May | (Denmark) Michel Nykjær | (Denmark) Michel Nykjær | (Denmark) Michel Nykjær | Chevrolet Motorsport Sweden |
| 3 | R5 | (Sweden) Sturup Raceway | 16 June | (Sweden) Tomas Engström | (Sweden) Tomas Engström | (Sweden) Tomas Engström | Honda Racing Sweden |
| 3 | R6 | (Sweden) Sturup Raceway | 16 June | (Denmark) Michel Nykjær | (Sweden) Tomas Engström | (Denmark) Michel Nykjær | Chevrolet Motorsport Sweden |
| 4 | R7 | (Sweden) Mantorp Park | 7 July | (Sweden) Rickard Rydell | (Sweden) Tomas Engström | (Sweden) Johan Kristoffersson | Volkswagen Team Biogas |
| 4 | R8 | (Sweden) Mantorp Park | 7 July | (Denmark) Michel Nykjær | (Sweden) Tomas Engström | (Denmark) Michel Nykjær | Chevrolet Motorsport Sweden |
| 5 | R9 | (Sweden) Airport Race Östersund | 11 August | (Sweden) Tomas Engström | (Sweden) Tomas Engström | (Sweden) Tomas Engström | Honda Racing Sweden |
| 5 | R10 | (Sweden) Airport Race Östersund | 11 August | (Sweden) Tomas Engström | (Sweden) Tomas Engström | (Sweden) Tomas Engström | Honda Racing Sweden |
| 6 | R11 | (Denmark) Jyllands-Ringen | 26 August | (Denmark) Michel Nykjær | (Spain) Jordi Gené | (Denmark) Michel Nykjær | Chevrolet Motorsport Sweden |
| 6 | R12 | (Denmark) Jyllands-Ringen | 26 August | (Spain) Jordi Gené | (Sweden) Johan Kristoffersson | (Sweden) Patrik Olsson | IPS Team Biogas |
| 7 | R13 | (Sweden) Ring Knutstorp | 9 September | (Denmark) Michel Nykjær | (Denmark) Michel Nykjær | (Denmark) Michel Nykjær | Chevrolet Motorsport Sweden |
| 7 | R14 | (Sweden) Ring Knutstorp | 9 September | (Sweden) Rickard Rydell | (Denmark) Michel Nykjær | (Sweden) Rickard Rydell | Chevrolet Motorsport Sweden |
| 8 | R15 | (Sweden) Solvalla Stockholm | 22 September | (Sweden) Johan Kristoffersson | (Sweden) Johan Stureson | (Sweden) Johan Kristoffersson | Volkswagen Team Biogas |
| 8 | R16 | (Sweden) Solvalla Stockholm | 22 September | (Sweden) Patrik Olsson | (Sweden) Johan Stureson | (Sweden) Johan Kristoffersson | Volkswagen Team Biogas |

== Championship standings ==
=== Drivers championships ===
| Pos | Driver | MAN (Sweden) | | KNU (Sweden) | | STU (Sweden) | | MAN (Sweden) | | ÖST (Sweden) | | JYL (Denmark) | | KNU (Sweden) | | SOL (Sweden) | | Pts |
Overall
| 1 | (Sweden) Johan Kristoffersson | 1 | 1 | 2 | 3 | 6 | 2 | 1 | 4 | 2 | 6 | 3 | 3 | 4 | Ret | 1 | 1 | 264 |
| 2 | (Sweden) Rickard Rydell | 2 | 2 | 1 | 2 | 5 | 3 | 2 | 3 | 3 | 4 | 2 | 4 | 3 | 1 | 4 | 4 | 258 |
| 3 | (Denmark) Michel Nykjær | 6 | 4 | Ret | 1 | 4 | 1 | 4 | 1 | 5 | 5 | 1 | 2 | 1 | 2 | 9 | 8 | 231 |
| 4 | (Sweden) Patrik Olsson | 5 | 5 | 4 | 6 | 3 | 4 | 6 | 5 | Ret | 7 | 4 | 1 | 2 | 4 | 3 | 5 | 183 |
| 5 | (Sweden) Tomas Engström | Ret | DNS | 3 | 4 | 1 | 5 | 3 | 2 | 1 | 1 | Ret | Ret | Ret | 6 | 5 | 3 | 178 |
| 6 | (Sweden) Johan Stureson | 3 | 3 | 5 | 5 | 2 | 11 | 5 | 6 | Ret | 3 | 5 | Ret | 5 | 5 | 2 | 2 | 167 |
| 7 | (Spain) Jordi Gené | 4 | 6 | 6 | 7 | 7 | 6 | 7 | 7 | 4 | 2 | 6 | 5 | 6 | 3 | 6 | 6 | 147 |
| 8 | (Sweden) Niclas Olsson | 8 | 7 | 9 | 9 | 8 | 7 | Ret | 10 | Ret | 9 | 8 | 6 | 8 | 9 | 8 | 7 | 55 |
| 9 | (Sweden) Santosh Berggren | 7 | Ret | 7 | 8 | 10 | 12† | 11† | 8 | Ret | DNS | 7 | 9 | 7 | 8 | 7 | 10† | 46 |
| 10 | (Sweden) Joakim Ahlberg | 10 | 10† | Ret | 12† | 11 | 10† | 9 | Ret | 6 | 12 | 12† | 7 | 9 | 10 | 10 | 9 | 25 |
| 11 | (Sweden) Andreas Ahlberg | Ret | 9 | 10 | 11 | 9 | 8 | 8 | 11 | 7 | 10 | 9 | 11† | 10 | Ret | 11† | 11† | 23 |
| 12 | (Sweden) Robin Appelqvist | Ret | 8 | 8 | Ret | 13† | DNS | Ret | 9 | Ret | 8 | Ret | 10† | Ret | 7 | Ret | Ret | 21 |
| 13 | (Sweden) André Andersson | 11† | Ret | DNS | DNS | 12 | 9 | 10 | 12 | 8 | 11 | 11 | 8 | 11 | 11 | DNS | DNS | 11 |
| 14 | (Sweden) Tony Johansson | | | Ret | 10 | Ret | DNS | Ret | Ret | 9 | Ret | 10 | Ret | DNS | DNS | DNS | DNS | 4 |
| 15 | (Sweden) Claes Hoffsten | 9 | Ret | | | | | | | | | | | | | | | 2 |
Semcon Cup
| 1 | (Sweden) Niclas Olsson | 8 | 7 | 9 | 9 | 8 | 7 | Ret | 10 | Ret | 9 | 8 | 6 | 8 | 9 | 8 | 7 | 350 |
| 2 | (Sweden) Andreas Ahlberg | Ret | 9 | 10 | 11 | 9 | 8 | 8 | 11 | 7 | 10 | 9 | 11† | 10 | Ret | 11† | 11† | 241 |
| 3 | (Sweden) Joakim Ahlberg | 10 | 10† | Ret | 12† | 11 | 10† | 9 | Ret | 6 | 12 | 12† | 7 | 9 | 10 | 10 | 9 | 224 |
| 4 | (Sweden) André Andersson | 11† | Ret | DNS | DNS | 12 | 9 | 10 | 12 | 8 | 11 | 11 | 8 | 11 | 11 | DNS | DNS | 153 |
| 5 | (Sweden) Tony Johansson | | | Ret | 10 | Ret | DNS | Ret | Ret | 9 | Ret | 10 | Ret | DNS | DNS | DNS | DNS | 45 |
| 6 | (Sweden) Claes Hoffsten | 9 | Ret | | | | | | | | | | | | | | | 18 |
| Pos | Driver | MAN (Sweden) | | KNU (Sweden) | | STU (Sweden) | | MAN (Sweden) | | ÖST (Sweden) | | JYL (Denmark) | | KNU (Sweden) | | SOL (Sweden) | | Pts |

| Colour | Result |
|---|---|
| Gold | Winner |
| Silver | Second place |
| Bronze | Third place |
| Green | Points classification |
| Blue | Non-points classification |
| Blue | Non-classified finish (NC) |
| Purple | Retired, not classified (Ret) |
| Red | Did not qualify (DNQ) |
| Red | Did not pre-qualify (DNPQ) |
| Black | Disqualified (DSQ) |
| White | Did not start (DNS) |
| White | Withdrew (WD) |
| White | Race cancelled (C) |
| Blank | Did not practice (DNP) |
| Blank | Did not arrive (DNA) |
| Blank | Excluded (EX) |

† — Drivers did not finish the race, but were classified as they completed over 90% of the race distance.
