= 2018 TCR Scandinavia Touring Car Championship =

Car racing season

The 2018 TCR Scandinavia Touring Car Championship was the eighth Scandinavian Touring Car Championship season. This season was the second season since the introduction of the TCR regulations and the last under the promotion of STCC AB, which declared bankruptcy in early February 2019. The season started at Ring Knutstorp on 4 May and ended at Mantorp Park on 22 September, after six rounds.

Robert Dahlgren is the defending drivers' champion, while Volkswagen Dealer Team Sweden are the defending teams' champions.

== Teams and drivers ==
Team	Car	No.	Drivers	Class	Rounds
(Sweden) PWR Racing – SEAT Dealer Team	CUPRA León TCR	1	(Sweden) Robert Dahlgren		All
(Sweden) PWR Racing – SEAT Dealer Team	CUPRA León TCR	37	(Sweden) Daniel Haglöf		All
(Sweden) SEAT Dealer Team – PWR Racing	CUPRA León TCR	19	(Sweden) Mikaela Åhlin-Kottulinsky		All
(Sweden) SEAT Dealer Team – PWR Racing	CUPRA León TCR	86	(Sweden) Philip Morin	JTCC	All
(Sweden) Racing For Charity	Audi RS3 LMS TCR	59	(Sweden) Peter "Poker" Wallenberg		All
(Sweden) Volkswagen Dealer Team BAUHAUS	Volkswagen Golf GTI TCR	3	(Sweden) Johan Kristoffersson		All
(Sweden) Volkswagen Dealer Team BAUHAUS	Volkswagen Golf GTI TCR	69	(Sweden) Hugo Nerman	JTCC	All
(Sweden) Volkswagen Dealer Team BAUHAUS	Volkswagen Golf GTI TCR	81	(Sweden) Nicklas Oscarsson	JTCC	All
(Sweden) Lestrup Racing Team	Volkswagen Golf GTI TCR	4	(Sweden) Oliver Söderström	JTCC	All
(Sweden) Lestrup Racing Team	Volkswagen Golf GTI TCR	7	(Sweden) Andreas Wernersson		All
(Sweden) Experion Racing Team	Volkswagen Golf GTI TCR	22	(Sweden) Albin Wärnelöv		All
(Sweden) WestCoast Racing	Volkswagen Golf GTI TCR	14	(Sweden) Fredrik Ekblom		All
(Sweden) WestCoast Racing	Volkswagen Golf GTI TCR	29	(Sweden) Andreas Bäckman	JTCC	1–4, 6
(Sweden) WestCoast Racing	Volkswagen Golf GTI TCR	26	(Sweden) Jessica Bäckman	JTCC	1–4, 6
(Sweden) Micke Kågered Racing	Volkswagen Golf GTI TCR	15	(Sweden) Oskar Krüger	JTCC	1–2
(Sweden) Micke Kågered Racing	Volkswagen Golf GTI TCR	17	(Sweden) Tomas Engström		4, 6
(Sweden) Micke Kågered Racing	Volkswagen Golf GTI TCR	21	(Sweden) Andreas Ahlberg		All
Honda Racing Sweden	Honda Civic TCR (FK2)	20	(Sweden) Mattias Andersson		All
(Sweden) Brovallen Design	Audi RS3 LMS TCR	23	(Sweden) Alex Andersson		1–4, 6
(Sweden) Brovallen Design	Audi RS3 LMS TCR	91	(Estonia) Andre Kiil		5–6
(Estonia) ALM Motorsport	CUPRA León TCR	91	(Estonia) Andre Kiil		2
(Sweden) Brink Motorsport	Audi RS3 LMS TCR	36	(Sweden) Micke Ohlsson		All
(Sweden) Brink Motorsport	Audi RS3 LMS TCR	71	(Sweden) Tobias Brink		All
(Finland) LMS Racing	CUPRA León TCR	44	(Finland) Olli Parhankangas	JTCC	1, 3–6

Icon	Class
JTCC	Junior

== Calendar ==
On 16 November 2017, the calendar was announced which was reduced from seven events to six. The championship will host five rounds in Sweden and the series would make a return to Norway for the first time since 2008 when it was called Swedish Touring Car Championship with the event would be held at the Rudskogen circuit. The Solvalla Circuit in Stockholm and Alastaro Circuit in Finland were dropped.

On 19 December 2017, it was announced that the series would revert to a two-race format after using a three-race format in the previous season. Reversed grids for Race 2 were also reintroduced after being absent from the previous season.

=== Race calendar and results ===
Round		Circuit	Location	Date	Pole position	Fastest lap	Race winner	Winning team	Supporting
1	R1	(Sweden) Ring Knutstorp	Kågeröd, Skåne	4–5 May	(Sweden) Philip Morin	(Sweden) Daniel Haglöf	(Sweden) Daniel Haglöf	(Sweden) PWR Racing – SEAT Dealer Team	Formula STCC Nordic
1	R2	(Sweden) Ring Knutstorp	Kågeröd, Skåne	4–5 May		(Sweden) Robert Dahlgren	(Sweden) Andreas Wernersson	(Sweden) Lestrup Racing Team	Formula STCC Nordic
2	R1	(Sweden) Anderstorp Raceway	Anderstorp, Jönköping	16–17 June	(Sweden) Johan Kristoffersson	(Sweden) Philip Morin	(Sweden) Philip Morin	(Sweden) SEAT Dealer Team – PWR Racing	Formula STCC Nordic
2	R2	(Sweden) Anderstorp Raceway	Anderstorp, Jönköping	16–17 June		(Sweden) Fredrik Ekblom	(Sweden) Tobias Brink	(Sweden) Brink Motorsport	Formula STCC Nordic
3	R1	(Sweden) Falkenbergs Motorbana	Bergagård, Halland	7–8 July	(Sweden) Robert Dahlgren	(Sweden) Andreas Wernersson	(Sweden) Robert Dahlgren	(Sweden) PWR Racing – SEAT Dealer Team	Formula STCC Nordic
3	R2	(Sweden) Falkenbergs Motorbana	Bergagård, Halland	7–8 July		(Sweden) Johan Kristoffersson	(Sweden) Mattias Andersson	Honda Racing Sweden	Formula STCC Nordic
4	R1	(Sweden) Karlskoga Motorstadion	Karlskoga, Örebro	18–19 August	(Sweden) Philip Morin	(Sweden) Daniel Haglöf	(Sweden) Daniel Haglöf	(Sweden) PWR Racing – SEAT Dealer Team	stand-alone event
4	R2	(Sweden) Karlskoga Motorstadion	Karlskoga, Örebro	18–19 August		(Sweden) Daniel Haglöf	(Sweden) Mikaela Åhlin-Kottulinsky	(Sweden) SEAT Dealer Team – PWR Racing	stand-alone event
5	R1	(Norway) Rudskogen Motorpark	Rakkestad, Østfold	8–9 September	(Sweden) Daniel Haglöf	(Sweden) Johan Kristoffersson	(Sweden) Johan Kristoffersson	(Sweden) Volkswagen Dealer Team BAUHAUS	Formula STCC Nordic
5	R2	(Norway) Rudskogen Motorpark	Rakkestad, Østfold	8–9 September		(Sweden) Philip Morin	(Sweden) Johan Kristoffersson	(Sweden) Volkswagen Dealer Team BAUHAUS	Formula STCC Nordic
6	R1	(Sweden) Mantorp Park	Mantorp, Östergötland	21–22 September	(Sweden) Andreas Wernersson	(Sweden) Johan Kristoffersson	(Sweden) Johan Kristoffersson	(Sweden) Volkswagen Dealer Team BAUHAUS	Formula STCC Nordic
6	R2	(Sweden) Mantorp Park	Mantorp, Östergötland	21–22 September		(Sweden) Daniel Haglöf	(Sweden) Tobias Brink	(Sweden) Brink Motorsport	Formula STCC Nordic

== Championship standings ==
=== Drivers' Championship ===
Pos	Driver	KNU (Sweden)		AND (Sweden)		FAL (Sweden)		GEL (Sweden)		RUD (Norway)		MAN (Sweden)		Pts
Pos	Driver	RD1	RD2	RD1	RD2	RD1	RD2	RD1	RD2	RD1	RD2	RD1	RD2	Pts
1	(Sweden) Johan Kristoffersson	4^{3}	3	5^{1}	4	2^{3}	16	3^{4}	3	1	1	1	5	195
2	(Sweden) Robert Dahlgren	2^{4}	2	3^{4}	2	1^{1}	6	5^{3}	7	2^{2}	3	3^{3}	Ret	185
3	(Sweden) Daniel Haglöf	1^{2}	5	2^{2}	19	3	10	1^{2}	5	3^{1}	5	5^{4}	2	176
4	(Sweden) Andreas Wernersson	6	1	6^{5}	5	4^{2}	4	4	4	6	2	2^{1}	4	167
5	(Sweden) Philip Morin	3^{1}	17	1^{3}	Ret	7	7	2^{1}	11	4^{3}	4	10	Ret	111
6	(Sweden) Fredrik Ekblom	5	4	7	3	5^{4}	2	7	16	7^{5}	8	4^{5}	6	111
7	(Sweden) Tobias Brink	17^{5}	6	17	1	9	3	6^{5}	6	11	11	11	1	93
8	(Sweden) Mattias Andersson	10	10	4	Ret	6	1	10	2	13	6	8	3	93
9	(Sweden) Hugo Nerman	7	7	11	9	13	5	11	19	5^{4}	13	Ret^{2}	8	44
10	(Sweden) Mikaela Åhlin-Kottulinsky	11	18	8	7	12	9	Ret	1	15	16	9	12	39
11	(Sweden) Oliver Söderström	8	15	10	10	Ret	8	8	8	9	9	6	Ret	30
12	(Sweden) Andreas Ahlberg	9	8	17	12	11^{5}	Ret	12	10	10	7	7	7	27
13	(Sweden) Micke Ohlsson	Ret	9	16	6	8	Ret	9	9	8	10	13	16	23
14	(Sweden) Andreas Bäckman	Ret	16	9	8	10	11	15	14			14	10	8
15	(Sweden) Nicklas Oscarsson	12	11	Ret	16	14	17	17	12	12	12	Ret	9	2
16	(Sweden) Alex Andersson	16	12	19	18	Ret	13	19	18			19	11	0
17	(Estonia) Andre Kiil			15	11					14	14	20	18	0
18	(Sweden) Jessica Bäckman	13	Ret	14	14	Ret	12	14	13			17	15	0
19	(Sweden) Tomas Engström							13	Ret			12	13	0
20	(Sweden) Albin Wärnelöv	Ret	DNS	13	13	15	14	18	15	Ret	17	16	17	0
21	(Finland) Olli Kangas	18	13			Ret	DNS	16	Ret	16	15	15	Ret	0
22	(Sweden) "Poker"	15	14	18	17	16	15	20	17			18	14	0
23	(Sweden) Oskar Krüger	14	Ret	Ret	15									0

Championship points were awarded on the results of each race at each event as follows:

Position	1st	2nd	3rd	4th	5th	6th	7th	8th	9th	10th
Race	25	18	15	12	10	8	6	4	2	1
Qualifying (Race 1)	5	4	3	2	1					

=== Junior Class ===
Pos	Driver	Pts
1	(Sweden) Philip Morin	212
2	(Sweden) Hugo Nerman	191
3	(Sweden) Oliver Söderström	173
4	(Sweden) Andreas Bäckman	137
5	(Sweden) Nicklas Oscarsson	124
6	(Sweden) Jessica Bäckman	88
7	(Finland) Olli Kangas	61
8	(Sweden) Oskar Krüger	18

=== Teams' Championship ===
Pos	Team	Pts
1	(Sweden) PWR Racing – SEAT Dealer Team	358
2	(Sweden) Volkswagen Dealer Team BAUHAUS	239
3	(Sweden) Lestrup Racing Team	196
4	(Sweden) WestCoast Racing	124
5	(Sweden) Brink Motorsport	123
6	(Sweden) SEAT Dealer Team – PWR Racing	120
7	Honda Racing Sweden	95
8	(Sweden) Micke Kågered Racing	31
9	(Sweden) Brovallen Design	1
NC	(Sweden) Experion Racing Team	0
NC	(Finland) LMS Racing	0
NC	(Sweden) Racing For Charity	0
