= 2026 FIA European Rallycross Championship =

The 2026 FIA European Rallycross Championship is the ongoing 51st season of the FIA European Rallycross Championship, recognized by the Fédération Internationale de l'Automobile as the highest class of international rallycross following the cancellation of the FIA World Rallycross Championship after the 2025 season. The championship will consist of four classes: RX1 and RX3, as well as the newly introduced RX4 and RX5 categories.

The championship begins on 9 May at the Biķernieku Kompleksā Sporta Bāze in Latvia, and will finish on 13 September at Circuito Automóvel de Lousada in Portugal.

== Calendar ==
The calendar was announced by the FIA on 28 November 2025. It featured six rounds. The Euro RX of Ireland at Mondello Park returned to the calendar for the first time since the 1996 season.

Rnd	Event	Date	Venue	Class	Winner	Team
1	Euro RX of Latvia	9–10 May	Biķernieku Kompleksā Sporta Bāze, Riga	RX1	(Sweden) Johan Kristoffersson	(Sweden) Kristoffersson Motorsport
1	Euro RX of Latvia	9–10 May	Biķernieku Kompleksā Sporta Bāze, Riga	RX3	(France) Julien Meunier	(France) Julien Meunier
1	Euro RX of Latvia	9–10 May	Biķernieku Kompleksā Sporta Bāze, Riga	RX4	(France) Andréa Bénézet	(France) Andréa Bénézet
1	Euro RX of Latvia	9–10 May	Biķernieku Kompleksā Sporta Bāze, Riga	RX5	(Germany) Tim Braumüller	(Poland) Volland Racing - Team Ligier
2	Euro RX of Hungary	30–31 May	Nyirád Racing Center, Nyirád	RX1	(Norway) Andreas Bakkerud	(Norway) Bergen Motorsport Evolution
2	Euro RX of Hungary	30–31 May	Nyirád Racing Center, Nyirád	RX3	(France) Julien Meunier	(France) Julien Meunier
2	Euro RX of Hungary	30–31 May	Nyirád Racing Center, Nyirád	RX4	(Poland) Filip Melon	(Poland) Filip Melon
2	Euro RX of Hungary	30–31 May	Nyirád Racing Center, Nyirád	RX5	(France) Valentin Comte	(Poland) Volland Racing - Team Ligier
3	Euro RX of Sweden	4–5 July	Höljesbanan, Höljes	RX1	(Sweden) Johan Kristoffersson	(Sweden) Kristoffersson Motorsport
3	Euro RX of Sweden	4–5 July	Höljesbanan, Höljes	RX3	(Lithuania) Rytis Gurklys	(Lithuania) NGRacing Team
3	Euro RX of Sweden	4–5 July	Höljesbanan, Höljes	RX4	(Poland) Filip Melon	(Poland) Filip Melon
3	Euro RX of Sweden	4–5 July	Höljesbanan, Höljes	RX5	(Spain) Diego Martínez González	(Spain) Nebrija Speedcar Factory Team
4	(Republic of Ireland) Euro RX of Ireland	18–19 July	Mondello Park, Caragh	RX1	(Norway) Andreas Bakkerud	(Norway) Bergen Motorsport Evolution
4	(Republic of Ireland) Euro RX of Ireland	18–19 July	Mondello Park, Caragh	RX3	(Lithuania) Rytis Gurklys (Note: Julian Meunier finished first, but was handed a three-second penalty for leaving the circuit and exceeding track limits during the final. Rytis Gurklys inherited the win.)	(Lithuania) NGRacing Team
4	(Republic of Ireland) Euro RX of Ireland	18–19 July	Mondello Park, Caragh	RX4	(France) Andréa Bénézet (Note: Filip Melon finished first, but was later disqualified due to the thickness of his Peugeot 208's radiator exceeding the maximum homologated figure. Thomas Quincé, who finished second would've inherited the win, but was also penalized for contact with Melon on the opening lap of the final. Andrea Benezet, who originally finished third, inherited the win instead.)	(France) Andréa Bénézet
4	(Republic of Ireland) Euro RX of Ireland	18–19 July	Mondello Park, Caragh	RX5	(Estonia) Armin Raag	(Estonia) Armin Raag
5	Euro RX of France	29–30 August	Circuit de Lohéac, Lohéac	RX1	(France) Fabien Pailler	(France) Pailler Compétition
5	Euro RX of France	29–30 August	Circuit de Lohéac, Lohéac	RX3	(France) Julien Meunier	(France) KMS by Meunier Competition
6	Euro RX of Portugal 1	12 September	Circuito Automóvel de Lousada, Lousada	RX1	(Sweden) Johan Kristoffersson	(Sweden) Kristoffersson Motorsport
6	Euro RX of Portugal 1	12 September	Circuito Automóvel de Lousada, Lousada	RX3	(Portugal) André Sousa	(Portugal) André Sousa
6	Euro RX of Portugal 1	12 September	Circuito Automóvel de Lousada, Lousada	RX4	(Poland) Filip Melon	(Poland) Filip Melon
6	Euro RX of Portugal 1	12 September	Circuito Automóvel de Lousada, Lousada	RX5	(Estonia) Armin Raag	(Estonia) Armin Raag
7	Euro RX of Portugal 2	13 September	Circuito Automóvel de Lousada, Lousada	RX1	(Sweden) Johan Kristoffersson	(Sweden) Kristoffersson Motorsport
7	Euro RX of Portugal 2	13 September	Circuito Automóvel de Lousada, Lousada	RX3	(Portugal) André Sousa	(Portugal) André Sousa
7	Euro RX of Portugal 2	13 September	Circuito Automóvel de Lousada, Lousada	RX4	(China) Haotian Deng	(Poland) Volland Racing
7	Euro RX of Portugal 2	13 September	Circuito Automóvel de Lousada, Lousada	RX5	(Germany) Bryan Neumeyer	(Germany) Bryan Neumeyer

== Series News ==
- The FIA announced in September 2025 that from the 2026 season the European Championship would again be the top category of international rallycross. The top class will only be populated by internal combustion cars. The announcement also included intent to establish the Rallycross World Cup; a competition in rallycross outside of Europe bringing together the best drivers from across the globe for a non-championship event showdown. When the World Rally Championship applies new technical regulations in 2028, those same regulations will be applied in rallycross with the goal of bringing back the FIA World Rallycross Championship for the 2028 season.
- Two new classes were introduced. The RX4 class will utilize current Rally4 machinery with minimal adaptions outside of removing the co-drivers seat and associated equipment. The RX5 class will utilize the technical specifications from the FIA European Cross Car Championship.
- On 10 March 2026, the FIA announced that the previously announced Rallycross World Cup would take place in Jakarta, Indonesia at the Jakarta International e-Prix Circuit on 5-6 December 2026. The drivers will compete in RX1-class vehicles, and the event will follow classic rallycross format.

== Entries ==
=== RX1 ===
Constructor	Team	Car	No.	Driver	Rounds	Ref
Audi	(Hungary) Kárai Motorsport Sportegyesület	Audi S1 RX	9	(Hungary) Zoltan Koncseg	1	
Audi	(Hungary) Kárai Motorsport Sportegyesület	Audi S1 RX	73	(Hungary) Tamás Kárai	1–2, 4–7	
Audi	(Poland) Volland Racing	Audi S1 RX	30	(Germany) Nils Volland	All	
Audi	(Poland) Automax Motorsport	Audi S1 RX	66	(Poland) Damian Litwinowicz	1–2	
Audi	(Republic of Ireland) Michael Leonard	Audi S1 RX	117	(Republic of Ireland) Michael Leonard	4, 6–7	
Citroën	(Slovakia) Beckert Technology	Citroën DS3 RX	44	(Slovakia) Bruno Beckert	2	
Citroën	(Slovakia) Beckert Technology	Citroën DS3 RX	133	(Slovakia) Norbert Beckert	2	
Citroën	(Slovakia) Beckert Technology	Citroën DS3 RX	155	(Slovakia) Ján Beckert	2	
Ford	(Estonia) Maiko Tamm	Ford Fiesta RX	11	(Estonia) Maiko Tamm	1	
Ford	(Norway) Bergen Motorsport Evolution	Ford Fiesta RX	13	(Norway) Andreas Bakkerud	All	
Ford	(Portugal) Cesar Pereira	Ford Fiesta RX	15	(Portugal) Cesar Pereira	6–7	
Ford	(Finland) SET Promotion	Ford Fiesta RX	20	(Finland) Joni Turpeinen	All	
Ford	(Finland) SET Promotion	Ford Fiesta RX	43	(Portugal) Sérgio Dias	6–7	
Ford	(Hungary) Nyirád Motorsport KFT	Ford Fiesta RX	50	(Hungary) Attila Mózer	2–3, 5–6	
Ford	(Hungary) Nyirád Motorsport KFT	Ford Fiesta RX	51	(Hungary) Mark Mózer	1	
Ford	(Sweden) Enlunds Motorsport	Ford Fiesta RX	60	(Sweden) Martin Enlund	All	
Ford	(Norway) Johannes Rafoss	Ford Fiesta RX	67	(Norway) Johannes Rafoss	All	
Ford	(Republic of Ireland) Thomas J. Graham	Ford Fiesta RX	72	(Republic of Ireland) Thomas J. Graham	4	
Ford	(United Kingdom) William Carey	Ford Fiesta RX	95	(United Kingdom) William Carey	4	
Ford	(Netherlands) Bart Bel	Ford Focus RX	69	(Netherlands) Bart Bel	3	
Honda	(Republic of Ireland) Eoin Murray	Honda Civic Coupe RX	40	(Republic of Ireland) Eoin Murray	5	
Honda	(Republic of Ireland) John McCluskey	Honda Civic Coupe RX	59	(Republic of Ireland) John Mc Cluskey	4	
Honda	(Republic of Ireland) Gary Donoghue	Honda Civic Coupe RX	80	(Republic of Ireland) Gary Donoghue	4	
Hyundai	(Lithuania) RB Motorsport	Hyundai i20 RX	14	(Lithuania) Rokas Baciuška	1, 5	
Hyundai	(Finland) SET Promotion	Hyundai i20 RX	18	(Finland) Juha Rytkönen	All	
Hyundai	(Sweden) Kevin Hansen	Hyundai i20 RX	71	(Sweden) Kevin Hansen	5	
Hyundai	(Norway) Hans-Jøran Østreng	Hyundai i20 RX	85	(Norway) Hans-Jøran Østreng	3	
Hyundai	(Portugal) João Ribeiro	Hyundai i20 RX	99	(Portugal) João Ribeiro	2–3, 5–7	
Mini	(United Kingdom) Oliver Bennett	Mini Cooper RX	42	(United Kingdom) Oliver Bennett	6–7	
Mini	(Sweden) Nils Andersson	Mini Cooper RX	114	(Sweden) Nils Andersson	5	
Peugeot	(United Kingdom) Team RX Racing	Peugeot 208 RX	2	(Republic of Ireland) Ollie O'Donovan	All	
Peugeot	(United Kingdom) Team RX Racing	Peugeot 208 RX	7	(United Kingdom) Patrick O'Donovan (Note: Patrick O'Donovan is an Irish racing driver competing with a British license.)	All	
Peugeot	(Sweden) Hedströms Motorsport	Peugeot 208 RX	5	(Sweden) Peter Hedström	3	
Peugeot	(Latvia) Jānis Baumanis	Peugeot 208 RX	6	(Latvia) Jānis Baumanis	1	
Peugeot	(Portugal) JMO	Peugeot 208 RX	10	(Portugal) José Oliveira	All	
Peugeot	(France) Eddy Benezet	Peugeot 208 RX	12	(France) Eddy Benezet	2	
Peugeot	(France) Julien Fébreau	Peugeot 208 RX	16	(France) Julien Fébreau	5	
Peugeot	(France) Sébastien Loeb	Peugeot 208 RX	19	(France) Sébastien Loeb	5	
Peugeot	(Estonia) Tikkri Motorsport	Peugeot 208 RX	23	(Estonia) Mart Tikkerbär	1	
Peugeot	(Hungary) Speedbox Racing Team KFT.	Peugeot 208 RX	27	(Hungary) László Kiss	2	
Peugeot	(Sweden) JRS	Peugeot 208 RX	36	(Sweden) Casper Jansson	All	
Peugeot	(Portugal) Leonel Sampaio	Peugeot 208 RX	47	(Portugal) Leonel Sampaio	6–7	
Peugeot	(Hungary) Nyirád Motorsport KFT	Peugeot 208 RX	50	(Hungary) Attila Mózer	7	
Peugeot	(Hungary) Nyirád Motorsport KFT	Peugeot 208 RX	51	(Hungary) Márk Mózer	2–3	
Peugeot	(France) Andréa Bénézet	Peugeot 208 RX	57	(France) Andréa Bénézet	5	
Peugeot	(Portugal) António Sousa	Peugeot 208 RX	129	(Portugal) António Sousa	6–7	
Peugeot	(Republic of Ireland) Derek Tohill	Peugeot 208 RX	177	(Republic of Ireland) Derek Tohill	4	
Renault	(Portugal) Joaquim Machado	Renault Clio RX	46	(Portugal) Joaquim Machado	6–7	
Renault	(France) Pailler Compétition	Renault Mégane R.S. RX	29	(France) Fabien Pailler	All	
Renault	(Hungary) TRX Motorsport	Renault Mégane R.S. RX	88	(Hungary) Andor Trepák	1–2	
SEAT	(Germany) ALL-INKL.COM Münnich Motorsport	SEAT Ibiza RX	38	(Germany) Mandie August	All	
SEAT	(Germany) ALL-INKL.COM Münnich Motorsport	SEAT Ibiza RX	77	(Germany) René Münnich	All	
Škoda	(Finland) Anton Seppä	Škoda Fabia RX	24	(Finland) Anton Seppä	All	
Škoda	(Lithuania) Paulius Pleskovas	Škoda Fabia RX	55	(Lithuania) Paulius Pleskovas	1–3, 6–7	
Volkswagen	(Sweden) Kristoffersson Motorsport	Volkswagen Polo RX	8	(Sweden) Johan Kristoffersson	All	
Volkswagen	(Sweden) Kristoffersson Motorsport	Volkswagen Polo RX	96	(Norway) Ole Christian Veiby	All	
Volkswagen	(Sweden) JC Raceteknik	Volkswagen Polo RX	17	(Sweden) Mats Öhman	3, 5	
Volkswagen	(Norway) Kjetil Larsen	Volkswagen Polo RX	22	(Norway) Kjetil Larsen	1	
Volkswagen	(Republic of Ireland) Niall Murray	Volkswagen Polo RX	25	(Republic of Ireland) Niall Murray	4	
Volkswagen	(Hungary) Speedbox Racing Team KFT.	Volkswagen Polo RX	27	(Hungary) László Kiss	5–7	
Volkswagen	(Sweden) JRS	Volkswagen Polo RX	28	(Sweden) Filip Thorén	3, 5–7	
Volkswagen	(Sweden) Team Skåab	Volkswagen Polo RX	32	(Sweden) Viktor Kristensson	3	
Volkswagen	(Denmark) Linnemann Promotion	Volkswagen Polo RX	33	(Denmark) Ulrik Linnemann	1–3	
Volkswagen	(Republic of Ireland) Shane Murphy	Volkswagen Polo RX	70	(Republic of Ireland) Shane Murphy	4	
Volkswagen	(Norway) Tom Daniel Tånevik	Volkswagen Polo RX	100	(Norway) Tom Daniel Tånevik	3	
Volkswagen	(Czech Republic) KRTZ Motorsport	Volkswagen Polo RX	111	(Czech Republic) Aleš Fučik	1–2, 5	

=== RX3 ===
Constructor	Team	Car	No.	Driver	Rounds	Ref
Audi	(Czech Republic) Biba Racing	Audi A1	14	(Czech Republic) Libor Teješ	All	
Audi	(Portugal) Luis Pedro Ferreira	Audi A1	18	(Portugal) Luis Pedro Ferreira	6–7	
Audi	(France) KMS by Meunier Competition	Audi A1	15	(France) Julien Meunier	1–6	
Audi	(Lithuania) NGRacing Team	Audi A1	22	(Lithuania) Rytis Gurklys	All	
Audi	(Poland) Volland Racing	Audi A1	26	(Belgium) Nicolas Geleyns	All	
Audi	(Czech Republic) AB Motorsport Klub V ACR	Audi A1	33	(Czech Republic) Jan Dvořák	1, 3, 5	
Audi	(France) Lambec	Audi A1	66	(France) Jérémy Lambec	2	
Audi	(Portugal) André Sousa	Audi A1	104	(Portugal) André Sousa	1–3, 5–7	
Ford	(Portugal) Rogerio Sousa	Ford Fiesta	105	(Portugal) Rogerio Sousa	6–7	
Ford	(Portugal) Tiago Ferreira	Ford Fiesta	121	(Portugal) Tiago Ferreira	All	
Peugeot	(Portugal) António Sousa Jr.	Peugeot 208	6	(Portugal) António Sousa Jr.	6–7	
Peugeot	(Portugal) Rafaela Barbosa	Peugeot 208	76	(Portugal) Rafaela Barbosa	6–7	
Peugeot	(Portugal) Jorge Machado	Peugeot 208	101	(Portugal) Jorge Machado	6–7	
Peugeot	(Portugal) Ricardo Costa	Peugeot 208	118	(Portugal) Ricardo Costa	6–7	
Škoda	(Hungary) Korda Racing	Škoda Fabia	7	(Hungary) Sámuel Kovács	All	
Škoda	(France) Julien Meunier	Škoda Fabia	15	(France) Julien Meunier	7	
Škoda	(Lithuania) Motorsport Šiauliai	Škoda Fabia	21	(Lithuania) Audrius Kragas	1–3, 5–7	
Škoda	(Czech Republic) KRTZ Motorsport	Škoda Fabia	28	(Austria) Josef Strebinger	2–3, 5	
Škoda	(Czech Republic) KRTZ Motorsport	Škoda Fabia	58	(Austria) Dominik Senegacnik	1–3, 5	
Škoda	(France) Tom Le Jossec	Škoda Fabia	35	(France) Tom Le Jossec	5	
Škoda	(Portugal) Bruno Gonçalves	Škoda Fabia	67	(Portugal) Bruno Gonçalves	6–7	
Škoda	(Portugal) André Monteiro	Škoda Fabia	69	(Portugal) André Monteiro	6–7	
Škoda	(Germany) Lukas Ney	Škoda Fabia	86	(Germany) Lukas Ney	3	
Škoda	(Czech Republic) Václav Tuma	Škoda Fabia	88	(Czech Republic) Václav Tuma	1–5	
Škoda	(Norway) Markus Røsrud	Škoda Fabia	95	(Norway) Markus Røsrud	All	
Škoda	(Lithuania) Valdas Mikužis	Škoda Fabia	153	(Lithuania) Valdas Mikužis	1	
Suzuki	(Hungary) Speedy Motorsport	Suzuki Swift	110	(Hungary) Levente Kacor	1–2	
Volkswagen	(France) Dufas	Volkswagen Polo	9	(France) Dylan Dufas	All	
Volkswagen	(France) Martin Massé	Volkswagen Polo	13	(France) Martin Massé	5	
Volkswagen	(Hungary) Kárai Motorsport Sportegyesület	Volkswagen Polo	45	(Hungary) Tamás Végh	5	

=== RX4 ===
Constructor	Team	Car	No.	Driver	Rounds	Ref
Ford	(Latvia) Lenards Lepsis	Ford Fiesta Rally4	14	(Latvia) Lenards Lepsis	1	
Lancia	(Portugal) Hélder Ferreira	Lancia Ypsilon Rally4 HF	55	(Portugal) Hélder Ferreira	5–6	
Peugeot	(Poland) Automax Motorsport	Peugeot 208 Rally4	7	(Poland) Anna Rusek	1–3, 5–6	
Peugeot	(Poland) Filip Melon	Peugeot 208 Rally4	69	(Poland) Filip Melon	All	
Renault	(Sweden) AT Racing Team	Renault Clio Rally4	6	(Norway) Marius Solberg Hansen	3	
Renault	(France) Eleven Motorsport	Renault Clio Rally4	12	(France) Andréa Bénézet	All	
Renault	(France) Eleven Motorsport	Renault Clio Rally4	25	(France) Thomas Quincé	All	
Renault	(Finland) SET Promotion	Renault Clio Rally4	32	(Estonia) Albert Ako Kokk	All	
Renault	(Latvia) Ivo Gabrāns	Renault Clio Rally4	94	(Latvia) Ivo Gabrāns	All	
Renault	(Poland) Volland Racing	Renault Clio Rally4	116	(China) Haotian Deng	All	

=== RX5 ===
Constructor	Team	Car	No.	Driver	Rounds	Ref
Atome	(France) Le Jossec Marin	Atome	15	(France) Marin Le Jossec	All	
Atome	(United Kingdom) Benjamin Bartlett	Atome	44	(United Kingdom) Benjamin Bartlett	1–3	
Hornet	(Latvia) Voldemars Kalve	Hornet R1	71	(Latvia) Roberts Purmalis	1	
LifeLive	(Hungary) Kárai Motorsport Sportegyesület	LifeLive TN11	8	(Hungary) Ottó Horváth	All	
LifeLive	(Hungary) Kárai Motorsport Sportegyesület	LifeLive TN11	11	(Hungary) Ádám Keló Gere	2	
LifeLive	(Estonia) PACE Motorsport	LifeLive TN11	25	(Estonia) Martin Juga	All	
LifeLive	(Portugal) Tiago Costa	LifeLive TN11	43	(Portugal) Tiago Costa	5–6	
Ligier	(Poland) Volland Racing - Team Ligier	Ligier XC04	19	(United Kingdom) Teddie Macpherson	3–4	
Ligier	(Poland) Volland Racing - Team Ligier	Ligier XC04	22	(Germany) Tim Braumüller	All	
Ligier	(Poland) Volland Racing - Team Ligier	Ligier XC04	117	(France) Valentin Comte	All	
Ligier	(United Kingdom) Benjamin Bartlett	Ligier XC04	44	(United Kingdom) Benjamin Bartlett	4–6	
P-Tech	(Estonia) Marko Andreas Muru	P-Tech Estfighter 2	27	(Estonia) Marko Muru	1–3, 5–6	
P-Tech	(Estonia) Armin Raag	P-Tech Estfighter 2	108	(Estonia) Armin Raag	All	
Planet Motorsport	(France) Martins	Planet Motorsport K3	5	(France) Paolo Martins	All	
Planet Motorsport	(France) Martins	Planet Motorsport K3	7	(France) Flavio Martins	All	
Semog	(Hungary) Korda Racing	Semog Shark	21	(Hungary) Domonkos Kovács	All	
Semog	(Latvia) Arnis Odins	Semog Shark	81	(Latvia) Ronalds Baldiņš	1	
Speedcar	(United Kingdom) David Thomas Kane	Speedcar Wonder-R	2	(United Kingdom) David Kane	4	
Speedcar	(Spain) Nebrija Speedcar Factory Team	Speedcar Wonder-R	17	(Spain) Diego Martínez González	All	
Speedcar	(Czech Republic) Aleš Fučik	Speedcar Wonder-R	77	(Czech Republic) Marek Mičík	2–6	
Speedcar	(Germany) Bryan Neumeyer	Speedcar Wonder-R	95	(Germany) Bryan Neumeyer	All	

== Championship standings ==
Points are scored as follows:

Position	1st	2nd	3rd	4th	5th	6th
Final points	22	15	12	9	6	3
Semi-Final points	12	10	8	6	4	2
Quarter-Final points	6	5	4	3	2	1

=== RX1 Championship ===
Pos.	Driver	LAT (Latvia)	HUN (Hungary)	SWE (Sweden)	IRL (Republic of Ireland)	FRA (France)	PRT (Portugal)		Points
1	(Sweden) Johan Kristoffersson	1	5	1	3	4	1	1	235
2	(Finland) Juha Rytkönen	6	2	4	5	3	3	3	175
3	(Norway) Andreas Bakkerud	4	1	5	1	2	14	8	171
4	(Norway) Ole Christian Veiby	2	4	2	2	17	9	6	144
5	(Finland) Joni Turpeinen	3	3	7	4	21	7	10	111
6	(United Kingdom) Patrick O'Donovan	5	11	13	7	9	2	4	108
7	(France) Fabien Pailler	DNS	7	11	20 (Note: Loss of 15 championship points for receiving a third set of engine seals across the season.)	1 (Note: Loss of 15 championship points for receiving a fourth set of engine seals across the season.)	4	2	86
8	(Sweden) Casper Jansson	8	6	3	13	16	21	7	72
9	(Germany) Nils Volland	19	14	14	6	11	13	5	52
10	(Republic of Ireland) Ollie O'Donovan	23	18	24	9	12	5	13	36
11	(Sweden) Martin Enlund	25	23	8	10	14	11	26	28
12	(Lithuania) Rokas Baciuška	9				5			27
13	(Hungary) László Kiss		19			13	6	12	24
14	(Denmark) Ulrik Linnemann	10	21	6					24
15	(Hungary) Tamás Kárai	22	13	WD	14	18	8	18	21
16	(Finland) Anton Seppä	15	15	20	15	22	17	11	20
17	(Germany) René Münnich	WD	24	12	17	24	10	22	18
18	(Portugal) José Oliveira	13	26	23	12	20	15	14	18
19	(Lithuania) Paulius Pleskovas	17	12	10			24	17	18
20	(Hungary) Andor Trepák	11	9						17
21	(France) Sébastien Loeb					6			15
22	(Portugal) João Ribeiro		17	22		8	23	WD	14
23	(Poland) Damian Litwinowicz	16	8						13
24	(Portugal) Sérgio Dias						16	9	13
25	(Republic of Ireland) Michael Leonard				8		20	28	12
26	(Norway) Johannes Rafoss	21	10	17	24	28	22	21	12
27	(France) Julien Fébreau					7			11
28	(Sweden) Peter Hedström			9					10
29	(Republic of Ireland) Eoin Murray					10			9
30	(Hungary) Mark Mózer	18	16	19					7
31	(Germany) Mandie August	25	22	15	22	DNS	27	19	7
32	(Republic of Ireland) Derek Tohill				11				6
33	(Portugal) Leonel Sampaio						12	23	6
34	(Estonia) Maiko Tamm	12							6
35	(Portugal) Joaquim Machado						18	16	5
36	(Czech Republic) Aleš Fučik	14	NC			23			4
37	(United Kingdom) Oliver Bennett						26	15	3
38	(France) Andréa Bénézet					15			3
39	(Sweden) Mats Öhman			16		25			3
40	(Republic of Ireland) John Mc Cluskey				16				3
41	(United Kingdom) William Carey				18				2
42	(Portugal) António Sousa						19	24	2
43	(Sweden) Kevin Hansen					19			2
44	(France) Eddy Benezet		20						3
45	(Latvia) Jānis Baumanis	20							2
46	(Sweden) Filip Thorén			25		26	25	20	1
47	(Norway) Hans-Jøran Østreng			21					1
48	(Republic of Ireland) Gary Donoghue				21				1
49	(Republic of Ireland) Thomas J. Graham				23				1
50	(Norway) Kjetil Larsen	24							0
51	(Hungary) Attila Mózer		25	25		27	29	25	0
52	(Republic of Ireland) Niall Murray				25				0
53	(Portugal) Cesar Pereira						28	27	0
54	(Norway) Tom Daniel Tånevik			27					0
55	(Slovakia) Bruno Beckert		27						0
56	(Estonia) Mart Tikkerbär	27							0
57	(Netherlands) Bart Bel			28					0
58	(Slovakia) Ján Beckert		29						0
59	(Sweden) Nils Andersson					29			0
60	(Hungary) Zoltan Koncseg	7	WD (Note: Loss of 15 championship points.)						-4
61	(Sweden) Viktor Kristensson			18 (Note: Loss of 10 championship points for sealing a new turbo outside of the scheduled scrutineering time.)					-8
62	(Republic of Ireland) Shane Murphy				19 (Note: Loss of 10 championship points.)				-8
63	(Slovakia) Norbert Beckert		28 (Note: Loss of 10 championship points for sealing a new turbo outside of the scheduled scrutineering time.)						-10
Pos.	Driver	LAT (Latvia)	HUN (Hungary)	SWE (Sweden)	IRL (Republic of Ireland)	FRA (France)	PRT (Portugal)		Points

Colour	Result
Gold	Winner
Silver	Second place
Bronze	Third place
Green	Points classification
Blue	Non-points classification
Blue	Non-classified finish (NC)
Purple	Retired, not classified (Ret)
Red	Did not qualify (DNQ)
Red	Did not pre-qualify (DNPQ)
Black	Disqualified (DSQ)
White	Did not start (DNS)
White	Withdrew (WD)
White	Race cancelled (C)
Blank	Did not practice (DNP)
Blank	Did not arrive (DNA)
Blank	Excluded (EX)

=== RX3 Championship ===
Pos.	Driver	LAT (Latvia)	HUN (Hungary)	SWE (Sweden)	IRL (Republic of Ireland)	FRA (France)	PRT (Portugal)		Points
1	(Lithuania) Rytis Gurklys	2	2	1	1	5	9	6	154
2	(France) Julien Meunier	1	1	11	3	1	7	5	152
3	(Czech Republic) Libor Teješ	9	4	4	6	8	2	2	106
4	(Portugal) André Sousa	5	14	6		10	1	1	97
5	(Antigua and Barbuda) Nicolas Geleyns	3	13	9	2	4	8	7	82
6	(Hungary) Sámuel Kovács	13	3	2	7	14	3	11	77
7	(Lithuania) Audrius Kragas	6	8	7	WD	2	10	8	62
8	(Norway) Markus Røsrud	7	6	3	9	6	17		54
9	(France) Dylan Dufas	12	5	5	4	13	WD	WD	47
10	(Portugal) Tiago Ferreira	15	7	13	5	9	5	14	38
11	(Portugal) Rogerio Sousa						4	4	34
12	(Portugal) André Monteiro						11	3	22
13	(France) Tom Le Jossec					3			20
14	(Czech Republic) Václav Tuma	10	9	12	8	11			18
15	(Lithuania) Valdas Mikužis	4							17
16	(Portugal) Jorge Machado						6	9	17
17	(Hungary) Levente Kacor	8	11	WD					8
18	(Austria) Dominik Senegacnik	11	12	8		WD			8
19	(France) Martin Massé					7			6
20	(Czech Republic) Jan Dvořák	14		10		12			6
21	(France) Jérémy Lambec		10						4
22	(Portugal) Luis Pedro Ferreira						16	10	2
23	(Portugal) Bruno Gonçalves						12	15	2
24	(Portugal) Rafaela Barbosa						13	12	0
25	(Portugal) Ricardo Costa						14	13	0
26	(Portugal) António Sousa Jr.						15	16	0
27	(Germany) Lukas Ney			15					0
28	(Hungary) Tamás Végh					15			0
29	(Austria) Josef Strebinger		15	14		WD			0
Pos.	Driver	LAT (Latvia)	HUN (Hungary)	SWE (Sweden)	IRL (Republic of Ireland)	FRA (France)	PRT (Portugal)		Points

=== RX4 Championship ===
Pos.	Driver	LAT (Latvia)	HUN (Hungary)	SWE (Sweden)	IRL (Republic of Ireland)	PRT (Portugal)		Points
1	(France) Andréa Bénézet	1	2	2	1	5	3	114
2	(Poland) Filip Melon	5	1	1	DSQ	1	5	100
3	(China) Haotian Deng	4	6	4	2	3	1	86
4	(Latvia) Ivo Gabrāns	6	4	3	3	2	4	78
5	(Estonia) Albert Kokk	2	5	5	4	6	2	74
6	(France) Thomas Quincé	3	3	7	5	WD	WD	40
7	(Poland) Anna Rusek	8	7	8	WD	4	6	24
8	(Norway) Marius Solberg Hansen			6				15
9	(Latvia) Lenards Lepsis	7						6
10	(Portugal) Hélder Ferreira					7	7	0
Pos.	Driver	LAT (Latvia)	HUN (Hungary)	SWE (Sweden)	IRL (Republic of Ireland)	PRT (Portugal)		Points

=== RX5 Championship ===
Pos.	Driver	LAT (Latvia)	HUN (Hungary)	SWE (Sweden)	IRL (Republic of Ireland)	PRT (Portugal)		Points
1	(Estonia) Armin Raag	2	4	4	1	1	2	154
2	(Estonia) Martin Juga	3	3	3	2	7	3	123
3	(Spain) Diego Martínez González	6	7	1	4	11	4	91
4	(France) Valentin Comte	12	1	2	14	6	6	83
5	(Germany) Bryan Neumeyer	15	13	5	10	2	1	79
6	(Germany) Tim Braumüller	1	6	9	6	5	11	76
7	(Estonia) Marko Muru	5	5	12	WD	4	7	55
8	(France) Marin Le Jossec	14	8	10	15	3	8	38
9	(United Kingdom) Benjamin Bartlett	8	14	15	9	9	5	28
10	(Hungary) Ádám Keló Gere		2					27
11	(United Kingdom) David Kane				3			24
12	(Czech Republic) Marek Mičík		15	11	5	10	10	24
13	(Hungary) Ottó Horváth	7	9	7	8	13	14	22
14	(Latvia) Roberts Purmalis	4						19
15	(United Kingdom) Teddie Macpherson			6	7			19
16	(France) Flavio Martins	10	11	14	11	12	9	14
17	(Hungary) Domonkos Kovács	9	12	8	12	14	15	14
18	(France) Paolo Martins	13	10	13	13	8	13	10
19	(Latvia) Ronalds Baldiņš	11						2
20	(Portugal) Tiago Costa					15	12	2
Pos.	Driver	LAT (Latvia)	HUN (Hungary)	SWE (Sweden)	IRL (Republic of Ireland)	PRT (Portugal)		Points
