= Johan Kristoffersson =

Swedish racing driver

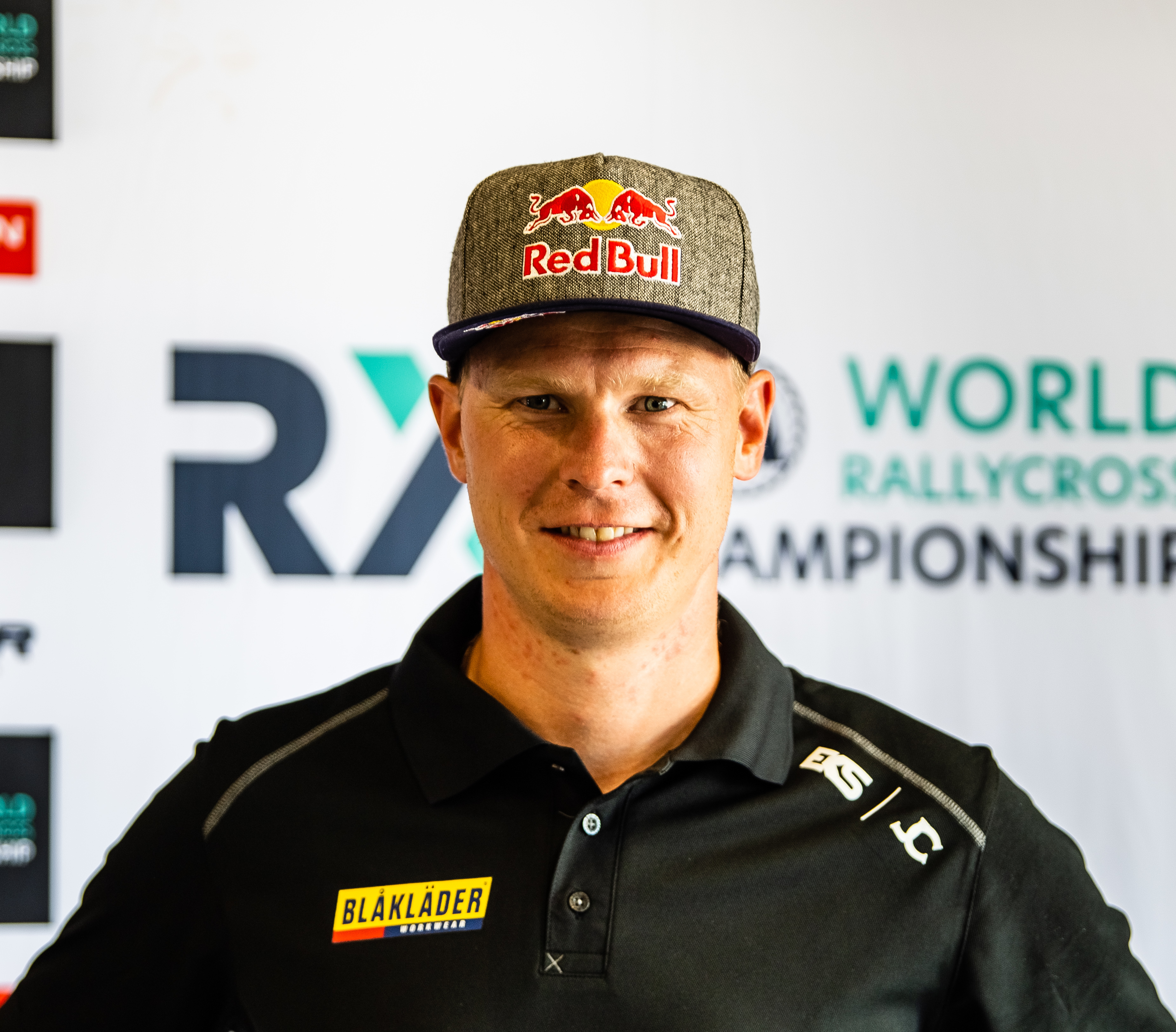
- Johan Kristoffersson in July, 2021
- Nationality: (Sweden) Swedish
- Born: Johan David Kristoffersson; 6 December 1988 (age 37) Arvika, Sweden
- Relatives: Tommy Kristoffersson (father)

FIA World Rallycross Championship career
- Debut season: 2014
- Current team: Kristoffersson Motorsport
- Categorisation: FIA Gold
- Car number: 1
- Spotter: Tommy Kristoffersson
- Former teams: Volkswagen RX Sweden, PSRX Volkswagen Sweden, KYB EKS JC
- Starts: 103
- Championships: 8 (2017, 2018, 2020, 2021, 2022, 2023, 2024, 2025)
- Wins: 48
- Podiums: 67
- Current team: Kristoffersson Motorsport

FIA ERX Supercar Championship
- Years active: 2013–2014, 2022
- Car number: 3
- Former teams: Volkswagen Dealer Team KMS
- Starts: 5
- Wins: 1
- Podiums: 2
- Best finish: 8th in 2014 (Supercar)

Previous series
- 2011 2011–12 2011–12 2009–2010 2008: Porsche Carrera Cup Germany; STCC; Porsche Carrera Cup Scandinavia; STCC (Sweden); JTCC (Sweden)

Championship titles
- 2021, 2023 2017-18, 2020-25 2012, 2018 2012 2012-13, 2015: Extreme E FIA World Rallycross; STCC; Superstars Series; Porsche Carrera Cup Scandinavia

Johan David Kristoffersson (born 6 December 1988) is a Swedish racecar driver. He is an eight-time World Rallycross Champion (six consecutive titles) having won the FIA World Rallycross Championship in 2017, 2018, 2020, 2021, 2022, 2023, 2024 and in 2025. In 2018 he won a record breaking 11 out of 12 events in the championship. He is the son of former racing driver and Kristoffersson Motorsport (KMS) team owner Tommy Kristoffersson. He also won the Superstars Series championship in 2012, the same year in which he claimed the Scandinavian Touring Car Championship and Porsche Carrera Cup Scandinavia titles.

== Racing career ==
=== Early career ===
Kristoffersson competed for his father's team in Junior Touring Car Championship in 2008. He finished fourth in the championship, after winning two races during the season, in a Volkswagen. KMS also competed in the Swedish Touring Car Championship, which he had to move up to the year 2009. He did not take any points in the main series, but finished second behind Viktor Hallrup in the Semcon Cup, a private preparatory cup. During the 2010 season, Kristoffersson drove for Team Biogas.se for three race weekends.

=== Touring Cars ===
Kristoffersson's breakthrough came in the 2011 season. It was to the races on the Falkenbergs Motorbana that he got to drive a third car for Team Biogas.se in Scandinavian Touring Car Championship. He was high up there, but had to retire both races. He then picked three fourth places in the four subsequent races, before he took a third place in the second race on the Ring Knutstorp. He then took another third place at Mantorp Park and finished the season in tenth place overall, despite the fact that he only drove just over half the season.

In 2011, Kristoffersson also drove in the Porsche Carrera Cup Scandinavia, where he fought for the title with Robin Rudholm. During the last race weekend, he had a good chance at the title, but lost it after receiving a penalty for a false start in the first race. Kristofferson won the second race, but still could not win the championship, then Rudholm finished second and had too big a lead in the overall driver's championship.

During the 2012 season, Kristoffersson competed in the Italian-based Touring Car Championship, Superstars Series, for Kristoffersson Motorsport under the name Audi Sport KMS. He took five titles in a single year – winning Porsche Carrera Cup Scandinavia, STCC and Superstars Series in all three categories (Italian, International and Rookie).

Kristoffersson joined the Petri Corse team for the 2013 Superstars Series season, where he drove a Porsche Panamera.

Also in 2013, Kristoffersson drove a family-run Volkswagen Scirocco at a European Rallycross Championship round.

On 20 December 2018, it was announced that Kristofferson would join Volkswagen for the 2019 World Touring Car Cup season, partnering team's regulars Mehdi Bennani and Rob Huff.

=== Rally and Rallycross ===
In 2014, Kristoffersson raced part-time at the FIA World Rallycross Championship with a Kristofferson Volkswagen Polo, finishing third at Belgium. In 2015, he won at Portugal and claimed podiums at UK, Spain, Turkey and Italy, finishing third in the standings.

In 2016, KMS and Marklund merged their Volkswagen factory teams, with Kristoffersson driving a Polo. He claimed a win, three podiums and nine top-six finishes, and was runner-up in the Supercars overall standings behind Mattias Ekström.

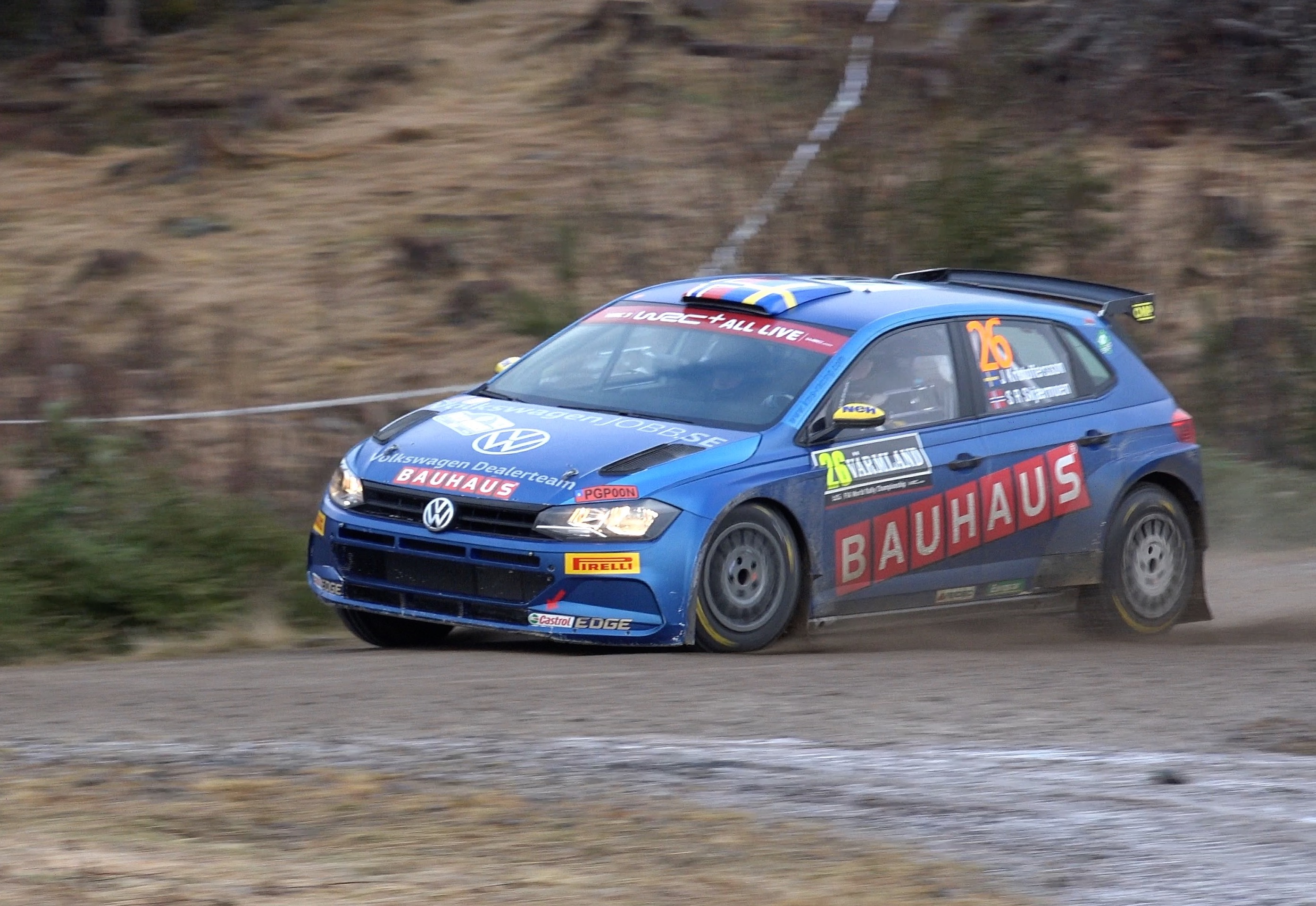
Kristoffersson at the 2020 Rally Sweden

In 2019, Kristofferson would also make the switch over to rallying, running a full-time campaign with Volkswagen in the Swedish Rally Championship with his WRX team Kristoffersson Motorsport, using the Volkswagen Polo GTI R5.

Kristoffersson won the 2018 WRX title with a record-breaking 11 out of 12 event wins during the season.

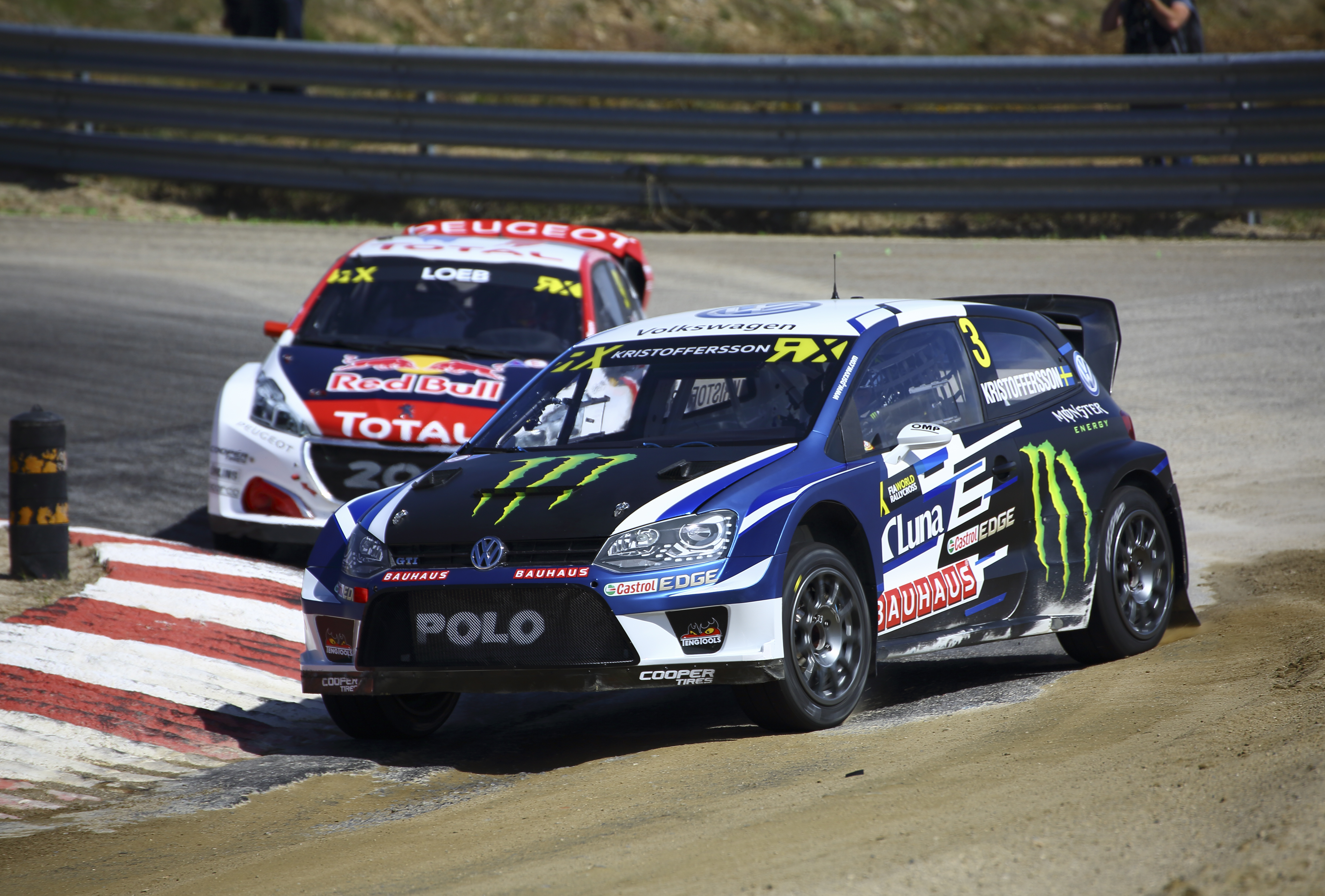
FIA World RX of Portugal 2017 in Montalegre

Kristoffersson won the 2017, 2018, 2020, 2021 2022, 2023, and 2024 FIA World Rallycross Championship making him a seven-time World Champion.

Kristoffersson participated in the 2022 FIA World Rallycross Championship and 2023 FIA World Rallycross Championship in a Kristoffersson Motorsport run Electric Volkswagen.

=== Extreme E ===
Kristofferson joined Rosberg X Racing in Extreme E for its inaugural season and drove alongside Australian Molly Taylor. They Won the Championship even though Team X44's drivers 9X World Rally Champion Sébastien Loeb and Spanish driver Cristina Gutiérrez finished level on points with them, as RXR had three wins to X44's one win.

Kristoffersson re-signed with RXR for the 2022 Extreme E Championship and would drive for them alongside fellow Swede Mikaela Åhlin-Kottulinsky. They won the first round of the season in Neom, Saudi Arabia.

== Racing record ==
=== Career summary ===
Season	Series	Team	Races	Wins	Poles	F/Laps	Podiums	Points	Position
2009	Swedish Touring Car Championship	Kristoffersson Motorsport	18	0	0	0	0	0	18th
2010	Swedish Touring Car Championship	Team Biogas.se	6	0	0	0	0	3	15th
2011	Scandinavian Touring Car Championship	Biogas.se	10	0	0	0	2	84	10th
2012	International Superstars Series	Audi Sport KMS	16	4	2	3	7	185	**1st**
2012	Scandinavian Touring Car Championship	Volkswagen Team Biogas	16	5	2	1	11	264	**1st**
2013	European Rallycross Championship	Volkswagen Dealer Team KMS	1	0	N/A	N/A	0	11	28th
2013	International Superstars Series	Petri Corse	2	0	0	0	0	0	NC
2014	European Rallycross Championship	Volkswagen Dealer Team KMS	3	1	N/A	N/A	2	30	8th
2014	FIA World Rallycross Championship	Volkswagen Dealer Team KMS	4	0	N/A	N/A	0	33	15th
2015	FIA World Rallycross Championship	Volkswagen Team Sweden	13	1	N/A	N/A	5	234	**3rd**
2016	FIA World Rallycross Championship	Volkswagen RX Sweden	12	1	N/A	N/A	3	240	**2nd**
2016	Scandinavian Touring Car Championship	PWR Racing - SEAT Dealer Team	12	2	2	2	5	243	**3rd**
2016	World Rally Championship	Johan Kristoffersson	1	0	N/A	N/A	0	0	NC
2017	FIA World Rallycross Championship	PSRX Volkswagen Sweden	12	7	N/A	N/A	10	316	**1st**
2017	TCR Scandinavia Touring Car Championship	Volkswagen Dealer Team Sweden	12	6	7	6	8	217	4th
2018	FIA World Rallycross Championship	PSRX Volkswagen Sweden	12	11	N/A	N/A	11	341	**1st**
2018	TCR Scandinavia Touring Car Championship	Kristoffersson Motorsport	12	3	1	3	7	195	**1st**
2018	World Rally Championship	Johan Kristoffersson	1	0	N/A	N/A	0	0	NC
2019	World Rally Championship-2	Volkswagen Dealer Team Bauhaus	2	0	N/A	N/A	2	30	14th
2019	World Touring Car Cup	SLR Volkswagen	30	3	1	2	5	243	5th
2020	FIA World Rallycross Championship	Volkswagen Dealerteam BAUHAUS	8	4	N/A	N/A	7	219	**1st**
2020	World Rally Championship-3	Kristoffersson Motorsport	1	0	N/A	N/A	1	15	13th
2021	Extreme E Championship	Rosberg X Racing	10	3	N/A	N/A	8	133	**1st**
2021	FIA World Rallycross Championship	KYB EKS JC	9	3	N/A	N/A	5	217	**1st**
2021	World Rally Championship-3	Kristoffersson Motorsport	1	0	N/A	N/A	0	5	50th
2022	Extreme E Championship	Rosberg X Racing	5	2	N/A	N/A	2	68	**2nd**
2022	FIA European Rallycross Championship	Kristoffersson Motorsport	1	0	N/A	N/A	0	12	16th
2022	FIA World Rallycross Championship	Kristoffersson Motorsport	10	8	N/A	N/A	8	183	**1st**
2022	24H GT Series - 992	HRT Performance							
2023	Extreme E Championship	Rosberg X Racing	10	3	N/A	N/A	7	159	**1st**
2023	FIA World Rallycross Championship	Volkswagen Dealerteam BAUHAUS	7	5	N/A	N/A	6	141	**1st**
2024	Extreme E Championship	Rosberg X Racing	4	1	N/A	N/A	1	67	**3rd**
2024	Nürburgring Langstrecken-Serie - TCR	MSC Sinzig e.V. im ADAC	2	1	0	0	2		
2024	24 Hours of Nürburgring - AT3	Max Kruse Racing	1	1	0	0	1	N/A	**1st**
2024	FIA World Rallycross Championship	KMS - HORSE Powertrain	10	5	N/A	N/A	7	240	**1st**
2025	Nürburgring Langstrecken-Serie - AT3	Max Kruse Racing							
2025	Porsche Carrera Cup Scandinavia	M3G Motorsport	4	0	1	1	2	66	12th
2025	FIA World Rallycross Championship	Kristoffersson Motorsport	6	3	N/A	N/A	5	144	**1st**
2026	Nürburgring Langstrecken-Serie - SP4T	Max Kruse Racing							
2026	FIA European Rallycross Championship	Kristoffersson Motorsport	7	4	N/A	N/A	5	235	**1st**

^{†} Non-championship event.
^{*} Season still in progress.

=== Complete Swedish Touring Car Championship results ===
(key) (Races in bold indicate pole position) (Races in italics indicate fastest lap)

Year	Team	Car	1	2	3	4	5	6	7	8	9	10	11	12	13	14	15	16	17	18	DC	Points
2009	Kristoffersson Motorsport	Audi A4	MAN; 1; 10	MAN; 2; 12	KAR; 1; 12	KAR; 2; 13	GÖT; 1 Ret	GÖT; 2 DNS	KNU; 1; 14	KNU; 2; 15	FAL; 1; 10	FAL; 2; 10	KAR; 1; 11	KAR; 2; 11	VAL; 1 Ret	VAL; 2; 16	KNU; 1 Ret	KNU; 2; 10	MAN; 1; 12	MAN; 2; 10	18th	0
2010	Team Biogas.se	Volkswagen Scirocco	JYL; 1	JYL; 2	KNU; 1	KNU; 2	KAR; 1	KAR; 2	GÖT; 1	GÖT; 2	FAL; 1	FAL; 2	KAR; 1	KAR; 2	JYL; 1; 15	JYL; 2; 15	KNU; 1; 10	KNU; 2; 13	MAN; 1; 15	MAN; 2; 11	15th	3

=== Complete Scandinavian Touring Car Championship results ===
(key) (Races in bold indicate pole position) (Races in italics indicate fastest lap)

Year	Team	Car	1	2	3	4	5	6	7	8	9	10	11	12	13	14	15	16	17	18	19	20	21	DC	Points
2011	Biogas.se	Volkswagen Scirocco	JYL; 1	JYL; 2	KNU; 1	KNU; 2	MAN; 1	MAN; 2	GÖT; 1	GÖT; 2	FAL; 1 Ret	FAL; 2 Ret	KAR; 1; 4	KAR; 2; 7	JYL; 1; 4	JYL; 2; 4	KNU; 1; 5	KNU; 2; 3	MAN; 1; 3	MAN; 2; 9				10th	84
2012	Volkswagen Team Biogas	Volkswagen Scirocco	MAN; 1; 1	**MAN**; **2**; 1	KNU; 1; 2	KNU; 2; 3	STU; 1; 6	STU; 2; 2	MAN; 1; 1	MAN; 2; 4	ÖST; 1; 2	ÖST; 2; 6	JYL; 1; 3	JYL; 2; 3	KNU; 1; 4	KNU; 2 Ret	**SOL**; **1**; 1	SOL; 2; 1						1st	264
2016	PWR Racing - SEAT Dealer Team	SEAT León STCC	SKÖ; 1; 4	SKÖ; 2; 5	MAN; 1; 3	MAN; 2 Ret	**AND**; **1**; 1	AND; 2; 3	FAL; 1; 2	FAL; 2; 5	KAR; 1 EX	KAR; 2 EX	SOL; 1	SOL; 2	**KNU**; **1**; 1	KNU; 2; 6								3rd	243
2017	Volkswagen Dealer Team Sweden	Volkswagen Golf GTI TCR	KNU; 1	KNU; 2	KNU; 3	**ALA**; **1**; 1	**ALA**; **2**; 1	**ALA**; **3**; 1	**SOL**; **1**; 1	**SOL**; **2**; 1	**SOL**; **3**; 2	FAL; 1; 2	FAL; 2; 4	FAL; 3; 1	**KAR**; **1** Ret	**KAR**; **2** DNS	KAR; 3 DNS	AND; 1	AND; 2	AND; 3	MAN; 1	MAN; 2	MAN; 3	4th	217
2018	Kristoffersson Motorsport	Volkswagen Golf GTI TCR	KNU; 1; 4	KNU; 2; 3	**AND**; **1**; 5	AND; 2; 5	**FAL**; **1**; 2	FAL; 2; 16	KAR; 1; 3	KAR; 2; 3	RUD; 1; 1	RUD; 2; 1	MAN; 1; 1	MAN; 2; 5										1st	195

=== Complete International Superstars Series results ===
(key) (Races in bold indicate pole position) (Races in italics indicate fastest lap)

Year	Team	Car	1	2	3	4	5	6	7	8	9	10	11	12	13	14	15	16	DC	Points
2012	Audi Sport KMS	Audi RS5	MNZ; 1; 5	MNZ; 2 Ret	**IMO**; **1**; 1	IMO; 2; 1	DON; 1; 2	DON; 2; 2	MUG; 1; 4	MUG; 2; 7	HUN; 1; 5	HUN; 2 Ret	SPA; 1; 2	SPA; 2 Ret	**VAL**; **1**; 1	VAL; 2; 1	PER; 1; 5	PER; 2 Ret	**1st**	**185**
2013	Petri Corse	Porsche Panamera S	MNZ; 1 DNS	MNZ; 2 DNS	BRN; 1	BRN; 2	SVK; 1	SVK; 2	ZOL; 1	ZOL; 2	ALG; 1	ALG; 2	DON; 1	DON; 2	IMO; 1	IMO; 2	VAL; 1	VAL; 2	NC	0

=== Complete FIA European Rallycross Championship results ===
(key)

==== Supercar/RX1 ====
Year	Entrant	Car	1	2	3	4	5	6	7	8	9	ERX	Points
2013	Volkswagen Dealer Team KMS	Volkswagen Scirocco	GBR	POR	HUN	FIN	NOR	SWE; 10	FRA	AUT	GER	28th	11
2014	Volkswagen Dealer Team KMS	Volkswagen Polo	GBR	NOR	BEL; DSQ	GER; 3	ITA; 1					8th	30
2022	Kristoffersson Motorsport	Volkswagen Polo	HUN	SWE; 4	NOR	LAT	PRT	BEL	GER			16th	12
2026	Kristoffersson Motorsport	Volkswagen Polo	LAT; 1	HUN; 5	SWE; 1	IRL; 3	FRA; 4	PRT 1; 1	PRT 2; 1			16th	12

=== Complete FIA World Rallycross Championship results ===
(key)

==== Supercar/RX1/RX1e ====
Year	Entrant	Car	1	2	3	4	5	6	7	8	9	10	11	12	13	WRX	Points
2014	Volkswagen Dealer Team KMS	Volkswagen Polo	POR	GBR	NOR	FIN	SWE; 20	BEL; DSQ	CAN	FRA	GER; 8	ITA; 5	TUR	ARG		15th	33
2015	Volkswagen Team Sweden	Volkswagen Polo	POR; 1	HOC; 8	BEL; 7	GBR; 3	GER; 4	SWE; 7	CAN; 11	NOR; 10	FRA; 4	BAR; 2	TUR; 3	ITA; 2	ARG; 13	3rd	234
2016	Volkswagen RX Sweden	Volkswagen Polo	POR; 6	HOC; 7	BEL; 6	GBR; 12	NOR; 7	SWE; 5	CAN; 3	FRA; 1	BAR; 6	LAT; 5	GER; 6	ARG; 2		2nd	240
2017	PSRX Volkswagen Sweden	Volkswagen Polo GTI	BAR; 6	POR; 3	HOC; 2	BEL; 1	GBR; 2	NOR; 1	SWE; 1	CAN; 1	FRA; 1	LAT; 1	GER; 7	RSA; 1		1st	316
2018	PSRX Volkswagen Sweden	Volkswagen Polo R	BAR; 1	POR; 1	BEL; 5	GBR; 1	NOR; 1	SWE; 1	CAN; 1	FRA; 1	LAT; 1	USA; 1	GER; 1	RSA; 1		1st	341
2020	Volkswagen Dealerteam BAUHAUS	Volkswagen Polo GTI	SWE; 1	SWE; 3	FIN; 1	FIN; 4	LAT; 1	LAT; 2	ESP; 2	ESP; 1						1st	219
2021	KYB EKS JC	Audi S1	ESP; 3	SWE; 7	FRA; 7	LAT; 5	LAT; 1	BNL; 1	POR; 6	GER; 1	GER; 3					1st	217
2022	Kristoffersson Motorsport	Volkswagen Polo RX1e	NOR; 1	LAT; 1	LAT; 1	POR; 1	POR; 5	BNL; 1	BNL; 1	ESP; 4	ESP; 1	GER; 1				1st	183
2023	Volkswagen Dealerteam BAUHAUS	Volkswagen Polo RX1e	POR; 1	NOR; 1	SWE; 1	GBR; C	BNL; C	GER; C								1st	141
2023	Volkswagen Dealerteam BAUHAUS	OMSE ZEROID X1							RSA; 1	RSA; 3	CHN; 6	CHN; 1				1st	141
2024	KMS - HORSE Powertrain	Volkswagen Polo KMS 601 RX	SWE; 1	SWE; 1	HUN; 5	HUN; 1	BNL; 4	BNL; 1	PRT; 1	PRT; 2	TUR; 6	TUR; 2				1st	240
2025	Kristoffersson Motorsport	Volkswagen Polo RX1e	PRT; 5	SWE; 1	HUN; 1	FIN; 2	TUR1; 1	TUR2; 2								1st	144

^{*} Season still in progress.

=== Complete WRC results ===
(key)

Year	Entrant	Car	1	2	3	4	5	6	7	8	9	10	11	12	13	14	Pos.	Points
2016	Johan Kristoffersson	Škoda Fabia S2000	MON	SWE; 21	MEX	ARG	POR	ITA	POL	FIN	GER	CHN	FRA	ESP	GBR	AUS	NC	0
2018	Johan Kristoffersson	Škoda Fabia R5	MON	SWE; 17	MEX	FRA	ARG	POR	ITA	FIN	GER	TUR	GBR	ESP	AUS		NC	0
2019	Volkswagen Dealerteam Bauhaus	Volkswagen Polo GTI R5	MON	SWE; 13	MEX	FRA	ARG	CHL	POR	ITA	FIN; 12	GER	TUR	GBR	ESP	AUS; C	NC	0
2020	Kristoffersson Motorsport	Volkswagen Polo GTI R5	MON	SWE; 14	MEX	EST	TUR	ITA	MNZ								NC	0
2021	Kristoffersson Motorsport	Volkswagen Polo GTI R5	MON	ARC; 27	CRO	POR	ITA	KEN	EST	BEL	GRE	FIN	ESP	MNZ			NC	0

* Season still in progress.

=== WRC-2 Results ===
(key)

Year	Entrant	Car	1	2	3	4	5	6	7	8	9	10	11	12	13	14	Pos.	Points
2019	Volkswagen Dealerteam Bauhaus	Volkswagen Polo GTI R5	MON	SWE; 3	MEX	FRA	ARG	CHL	POR	ITA	FIN; 3	GER	TUR	GBR	ESP	AUS; C	14th	30

=== WRC-3 Results ===
(key)

Year	Entrant	Car	1	2	3	4	5	6	7	8	9	10	11	12	Pos.	Points
2020	Kristoffersson Motorsport	Volkswagen Polo GTI R5	MON	SWE; 3	MEX	EST	TUR	ITA	MNZ						13th	15
2021	Kristoffersson Motorsport	Volkswagen Polo GTI R5	MON	ARC; 10	CRO	POR	ITA	KEN	EST	BEL	GRE	FIN	ESP	MNZ	50th	5

* Season still in progress.

=== Complete World Touring Car Cup results ===
(key) (Races in bold indicate pole position) (Races in italics indicate fastest lap)

Year	Team	Car	1	2	3	4	5	6	7	8	9	10	11	12	13	14	15	16	17	18	19	20	21	22	23	24	25	26	27	28	29	30	DC	Pts
2019	SLR Volkswagen	Volkswagen Golf GTI TCR	MAR; 1 Ret	MAR; 2; 17	MAR; 3; 17	HUN; 1; 8	HUN; 2 Ret	HUN; 3; 22	SVK; 1; 20	SVK; 2; 15	SVK; 3; 18	NED; 1; 4	NED; 2; 3	NED; 3; 7	GER; 1; 10	GER; 2; 1	GER; 3 Ret	POR; 1; 7	POR; 2; 14	POR; 3; 10	CHN; 1; 8	CHN; 2; 12	CHN; 3; 10	JPN; 1; 5	JPN; 2; 7	**JPN**; **3**; 1	MAC; 1; 11	MAC; 2; 5	MAC; 3; 4	MAL; 1; 8	MAL; 2; 3	MAL; 3; 1	5th	243

=== Complete Extreme E results ===
(key)

Year	Team	Car	1	2	3	4	5	6	7	8	9	10	Pos.	Points
2021	Rosberg X Racing	Spark ODYSSEY 21	DES; Q 3	DES; R 1	OCE; Q 2	OCE; R 1	ARC; Q 3	ARC; R 5	ISL; Q 2	ISL; R 1	JUR; Q 2	JUR; R 4	1st	133
2022	Rosberg X Racing	Spark ODYSSEY 21	DES; 1	ISL1; 5	ISL2; 1	COP; 6	ENE; 10						2nd	68
2023	Rosberg X Racing	Spark ODYSSEY 21	DES; 1; 3	DES; 2; 3	HYD; 1; 5	HYD; 2; 5	ISL1; 1; 1	ISL1; 2; 1	ISL2; 1; 4	ISL2; 2; 2	COP; 1; 1	COP; 2; 2	1st	159
2024	Rosberg X Racing	Spark ODYSSEY 21	DES; 1; 1	DES; 2; 4	HYD; 1; 4	HYD; 2; 4	ISL1; 1 C	ISL1; 2 C	ISL2; 1 C	ISL2; 2 C	VAL; 1 C	VAL; 2 C	3rd ^{†}	67 ^{†}
2025	Team KMS	Spark ODYSSEY 21	DES; 1; 1	DES; 2; 3									N/A	N/A

^{†} Season abandoned.

Sporting positions
Preceded by Rickard Rydell	Scandinavian Touring Car Championship; Champion; 2012	Succeeded by Thed Björk
Preceded by Alberto Cerqui	Campionato Italiano Superstars; Champion; 2012	Succeeded by Gianni Morbidelli
Preceded by Andrea Bertolini	International Superstars Series; Champion; 2012	Succeeded by Gianni Morbidelli
Preceded by Robin Rudholm	Porsche Carrera Cup Scandinavia; Champion; 2012-2013	Succeeded by Oscar Palm
Preceded by Oscar Palm	Porsche Carrera Cup Scandinavia; Champion; 2015	Succeeded by Fredrik Larsson
Preceded by Mattias Ekström	World Rallycross Champion; 2017-2018	Succeeded by Timmy Hansen
Preceded by Robert Dahlgren	TCR Scandinavia Touring Car Championship; Champion; 2018	Succeeded by Robert Dahlgren
Preceded by René Rast; Timo Bernhard	Race of Champions Nations' Cup; 2019; With: Tom Kristensen	Succeeded by Petter Solberg; Oliver Solberg
Preceded by Timmy Hansen	World Rallycross Champion; 2020-2025	Succeeded by Incumbent
