= 2017 TCR Scandinavia Touring Car Championship =

Scandinavian touring car racing season

The 2017 TCR Scandinavia Touring Car Championship was the seventh Scandinavian Touring Car Championship season. This season will see the introduction of the TCR regulations. The season started at Ring Knutstorp on 7 May and ended at Mantorp Park on 17 September, after eight rounds.

== Teams and drivers ==
Team	Car	No.	Driver	Rounds
(Sweden) SEAT Dealer Team - PWR Racing	SEAT León TCR	2	(Sweden) Robert Dahlgren	All
(Sweden) SEAT Dealer Team - PWR Racing	SEAT León TCR	37	(Sweden) Daniel Haglöf	All
(Sweden) PWR Racing Customer Team	SEAT León TCR	59	(Sweden) "Poker"	All
(Sweden) PWR Racing Junior Team	Audi RS3 LMS TCR	80	(Sweden) John Bryant-Meisner	7
(Sweden) PWR Racing Junior Team	Audi RS3 LMS TCR	89	(Sweden) Mikaela Åhlin-Kottulinsky	1, 3–6
Volkswagen Dealer Team Sweden	Volkswagen Golf GTI TCR	3	(Sweden) Johan Kristoffersson	2–5
Volkswagen Dealer Team Sweden	Volkswagen Golf GTI TCR	9	(Sweden) Fredrik Blomstedt	All
Volkswagen Dealer Team Sweden	Volkswagen Golf GTI TCR	30	(Sweden) Fredrik Ekblom	All
(Sweden) Lestrup Racing Team	Volkswagen Golf GTI TCR	4	(Sweden) Dennis Strandberg	1–4, 6
(Sweden) Lestrup Racing Team	Volkswagen Golf GTI TCR	7	(Sweden) Andreas Wernersson	7
(Sweden) Lestrup Racing Team	Volkswagen Golf GTI TCR	8	(Sweden) Robin Fredriksson	5
(Sweden) Experion Racing Team	Volkswagen Golf GTI TCR	22	(Sweden) Albin Wärnelöv	All
(Sweden) Brovallen Design	Audi RS3 LMS TCR	6	(Sweden) Joakim Darbom	6
(Sweden) Brovallen Design	Audi RS3 LMS TCR	88	(Sweden) Reuben Kressner	All
(Finland) LMS Racing	Audi RS3 LMS TCR	10	(Finland) Antti Buri	2
(Finland) LMS Racing	Audi RS3 LMS TCR	68	(Finland) Niko Kankkunen	2
(Finland) LMS Racing	SEAT León TCR	44	(Finland) Olli Parhankangas	All
(Finland) LMS Racing	SEAT León TCR	57	(Sweden) Andreas Andersson	1
(Finland) LMS Racing	SEAT León TCR	67	(Finland) Kari-Pekka Laaksonen	1–4, 6
(Sweden) LMP Engineering	Honda Civic TCR	11	(Sweden) Niklas Lilja	1
(Sweden) Team Honda Racing	Honda Civic TCR	20	(Sweden) Mattias Andersson	All
(Sweden) Micke Kågered Racing	Volkswagen Golf GTI TCR	21	(Sweden) Andreas Ahlberg	All
(Sweden) Brink Motorsport	Audi RS3 LMS TCR	36	(Sweden) Micke Ohlsson	All
(Sweden) Brink Motorsport	Audi RS3 LMS TCR	71	(Sweden) Tobias Brink	All
(Finland) Kart In Club Driving Academy	Audi RS3 LMS TCR	45	(Finland) Joonas Lappalainen	2–6
(Sweden) Rent A Wreck Racing	Honda Civic TCR	61	(Sweden) Marcus Annervi	All
(Sweden) TeamA Teknik	Kia Cee'd TCR	81	(Sweden) Nicklas Oscarsson	All

=== Team and driver changes ===
With the introduction of the new technical regulations many of the teams competing in the previous season did not return. Polestar Cyan Racing left the STCC for the support Swedish GT series. Flash Engineering also left the championship.

== Calendar ==
On 18 October 2016, a preliminary calendar was announced, with one round still to be announced. The championship will host six rounds in Sweden and one round in Finland.

=== Race calendar and results ===
Round		Circuit	Location	Date	Pole position	Fastest lap	Race winner	Winning team
1	R1	(Sweden) Ring Knutstorp	Kågeröd, Skåne	6 May	(Sweden) Fredrik Ekblom	(Sweden) Fredrik Ekblom	(Sweden) Robert Dahlgren	(Sweden) SEAT Dealer Team - PWR Racing
1	R2	(Sweden) Ring Knutstorp	Kågeröd, Skåne	6 May	(Sweden) Robert Dahlgren	(Sweden) Fredrik Ekblom	(Sweden) Robert Dahlgren	(Sweden) SEAT Dealer Team - PWR Racing
1	R3	(Sweden) Ring Knutstorp	Kågeröd, Skåne	6 May	(Sweden) Fredrik Ekblom	(Sweden) Fredrik Ekblom	(Sweden) Fredrik Ekblom	Volkswagen Dealer Team Sweden
2	R1	(Finland) Alastaro Circuit	Virttaa, Loimaa	20 May	(Sweden) Johan Kristoffersson	(Sweden) Johan Kristoffersson	(Sweden) Johan Kristoffersson	Volkswagen Dealer Team Sweden
2	R2	(Finland) Alastaro Circuit	Virttaa, Loimaa	20 May	(Sweden) Johan Kristoffersson	(Sweden) Johan Kristoffersson	(Sweden) Johan Kristoffersson	Volkswagen Dealer Team Sweden
2	R3	(Finland) Alastaro Circuit	Virttaa, Loimaa	20 May	(Sweden) Johan Kristoffersson	(Sweden) Johan Kristoffersson	(Sweden) Johan Kristoffersson	Volkswagen Dealer Team Sweden
3	R1	(Sweden) Solvalla	Stockholm, Stockholm	17 June	(Sweden) Daniel Haglöf	(Sweden) Johan Kristoffersson	(Sweden) Johan Kristoffersson	Volkswagen Dealer Team Sweden
3	R2	(Sweden) Solvalla	Stockholm, Stockholm	17 June	(Sweden) Johan Kristoffersson	(Sweden) Johan Kristoffersson	(Sweden) Johan Kristoffersson	Volkswagen Dealer Team Sweden
3	R3	(Sweden) Solvalla	Stockholm, Stockholm	17 June	(Sweden) Johan Kristoffersson	(Sweden) Johan Kristoffersson	(Sweden) Robert Dahlgren	(Sweden) SEAT Dealer Team - PWR Racing
4	R1	(Sweden) Falkenbergs Motorbana	Bergagård, Halland	9 July	(Sweden) Fredrik Ekblom	(Sweden) Fredrik Blomstedt	(Sweden) Fredrik Blomstedt	Volkswagen Dealer Team Sweden
4	R2	(Sweden) Falkenbergs Motorbana	Bergagård, Halland	9 July	(Sweden) Fredrik Ekblom	(Sweden) Daniel Haglöf	(Sweden) Fredrik Ekblom	Volkswagen Dealer Team Sweden
4	R3	(Sweden) Falkenbergs Motorbana	Bergagård, Halland	9 July	(Sweden) Fredrik Blomstedt	(Sweden) Dennis Strandberg	(Sweden) Johan Kristoffersson	Volkswagen Dealer Team Sweden
5	R1	(Sweden) Karlskoga Motorstadion	Karlskoga, Örebro	13 August	(Sweden) Johan Kristoffersson	(Sweden) Daniel Haglöf	(Sweden) Robert Dahlgren	(Sweden) SEAT Dealer Team - PWR Racing
5	R2	(Sweden) Karlskoga Motorstadion	Karlskoga, Örebro	13 August	(Sweden) Johan Kristoffersson	(Finland) Joonas Lappalainen	(Sweden) Fredrik Ekblom	Volkswagen Dealer Team Sweden
5	R3	(Sweden) Karlskoga Motorstadion	Karlskoga, Örebro	13 August	(Sweden) Robert Dahlgren	(Sweden) Fredrik Blomstedt	(Sweden) Robert Dahlgren	(Sweden) SEAT Dealer Team - PWR Racing
6	R1	(Sweden) Anderstorp Raceway	Anderstorp, Jönköping	3 September	(Sweden) Daniel Haglöf	(Sweden) Fredrik Blomstedt	(Sweden) Daniel Haglöf	(Sweden) SEAT Dealer Team - PWR Racing
6	R2	(Sweden) Anderstorp Raceway	Anderstorp, Jönköping	3 September	(Sweden) Fredrik Blomstedt	(Sweden) Robert Dahlgren	(Sweden) Robert Dahlgren	(Sweden) SEAT Dealer Team - PWR Racing
6	R3	(Sweden) Anderstorp Raceway	Anderstorp, Jönköping	3 September	(Sweden) Robert Dahlgren	(Sweden) Fredrik Blomstedt	(Sweden) Robert Dahlgren	(Sweden) SEAT Dealer Team - PWR Racing
7	R1	(Sweden) Mantorp Park	Mantorp, Östergötland	17 September	(Sweden) Fredrik Ekblom	(Sweden) Mattias Andersson	(Sweden) Fredrik Ekblom	Volkswagen Dealer Team Sweden
7	R2	(Sweden) Mantorp Park	Mantorp, Östergötland	17 September	(Sweden) Fredrik Ekblom	(Sweden) Tobias Brink	(Sweden) Fredrik Ekblom	Volkswagen Dealer Team Sweden
7	R3	(Sweden) Mantorp Park	Mantorp, Östergötland	17 September	(Sweden) Mattias Andersson	(Sweden) Fredrik Ekblom	(Sweden) Fredrik Blomstedt	Volkswagen Dealer Team Sweden

== Championship standings ==
=== Drivers' championship ===
Pos	Driver	KNU (Sweden)			ALA (Finland)			SOL (Sweden)			FAL (Sweden)			GEL (Sweden)			AND (Sweden)			MAN (Sweden)			Pts
Pos	Driver	RD1	RD2	RD3	RD1	RD2	RD3	RD1	RD2	RD3	RD1	RD2	RD3	RD1	RD2	RD3	RD1	RD2	RD3	RD1	RD2	RD3	Pts
1	(Sweden) Robert Dahlgren	1	**1**	2	4	3	5	2	2	1	4	2	2	1	3	**1**	3	1	**1**	6	8	3	374
2	(Sweden) Fredrik Ekblom	**2**	2	**1**	3	2	3	11	3	3	**3**	**1**	16	2	1	3	2	12	4	**1**	**1**	8	327
3	(Sweden) Fredrik Blomstedt	3	7	4	2	16	2	4	4	9	1	14	**DNS**	9	2	6	5	**2**	2	13	DSQ	1	223
4	(Sweden) Johan Kristoffersson				**1**	**1**	**1**	1	**1**	**2**	2	4	1	**Ret**	**DNS**	4							217
5	(Sweden) Daniel Haglöf	4	4	3	8	4	10	**7**	10	5	5	3	13	8	4	2	**1**	14	3	4	Ret	Ret	186
6	(Sweden) Mattias Andersson	9	9	8	14	12	4	3	16	13	Ret	7	14	3	5	7	7	4	10	5	2	**2**	137
7	(Sweden) Tobias Brink	5	3	5	7	Ret	9	10	7	7	6	9	5	Ret	6	Ret	9	Ret	5	9	3	6	121
8	(Finland) Joonas Lappalainen				15	5	6	6	6	Ret	10	6	8	4	8	5	4	3	Ret				100
9	(Sweden) Andreas Ahlberg	10	Ret	7	6	13	DNS	15	17	6	Ret	DNS	7	7	7	11	8	6	DSQ	3	4	5	90
10	(Sweden) Micke Ohlsson	11	Ret	6	5	Ret	DNS	12	11	14	8	16	4	Ret	Ret	12	6	5	9	10	7	Ret	61
11	(Sweden) Dennis Strandberg	15	5	Ret	10	8	7	5	5	4	Ret	Ret	12				18	Ret	6				61
12	(Sweden) Reuben Kressner	14	13	DNS	13	10	11	8	9	10	7	5	3	13	Ret	10	17	7	8	Ret	9	7	60
13	(Sweden) Andreas Wernersson																			2	6	4	38
14	(Sweden) Albin Wärnelöv	12	8	9	DSQ	9	Ret	9	18	Ret	Ret	8	6	5	9	9	14	DNS	DNS	Ret	DNS	DNS	36
15	(Sweden) Marcus Annervi	8	Ret	10	12	Ret	Ret	14	DNS	DNS	12	17	17	Ret	13	16	11	8	7	12	5	12	23
16	(Finland) Olli Parhankangas	13	11	13	16	7	12	Ret	13	12	13	10	9	10	14	8	13	9	14	7	Ret	11	22
17	(Sweden) Nicklas Oscarsson	7	15	Ret	DNS	DNS	DNS	13	12	9	11	15	DNS	6	10	Ret	10	16	11	8	Ret	DNS	22
18	(Sweden) Niklas Lilja	6	6	15																			16
19	(Finland) Antti Buri				11	6	14																8
20	(Sweden) Mikaela Åhlin-Kottulinsky	Ret	Ret	12				Ret	8	11	9	11	15	Ret	12	15	Ret	15	Ret				6
21	(Finland) Niko Kankkunen				9	15	8																6
22	(Sweden) John Bryant-Meisner																			Ret	DNS	9	2
23	(Finland) Kari-Pekka Laaksonen	16	10	11	17	11	Ret	Ret	14	16	Ret	13	10				16	13	Ret				2
24	(Sweden) "Poker"	Ret	12	14	18	14	13	16	15	15	14	12	11	12	15	14	15	11	12	11	Ret	10	1
25	(Sweden) Joakim Darbom																12	10	13				1
26	(Sweden) Robin Fredriksson													11	11	13							0
27	(Sweden) Andreas Andersson	17	14	DNS																			0
Pos	Driver	KNU (Sweden)			ALA (Finland)			SOL (Sweden)			FAL (Sweden)			GEL (Sweden)			AND (Sweden)			MAN (Sweden)			Pts

Colour	Result
Gold	Winner
Silver	Second place
Bronze	Third place
Green	Points classification
Blue	Non-points classification
Blue	Non-classified finish (NC)
Purple	Retired, not classified (Ret)
Red	Did not qualify (DNQ)
Red	Did not pre-qualify (DNPQ)
Black	Disqualified (DSQ)
White	Did not start (DNS)
White	Withdrew (WD)
White	Race cancelled (C)
Blank	Did not practice (DNP)
Blank	Did not arrive (DNA)
Blank	Excluded (EX)

**Bold** – Pole

Italics – Fastest Lap

=== Teams' championship ===
Pos	Driver	KNU (Sweden)			ALA (Finland)			SOL (Sweden)			FAL (Sweden)			GEL (Sweden)			AND (Sweden)			MAN (Sweden)			Pts
Pos	Driver	RD1	RD2	RD3	RD1	RD2	RD3	RD1	RD2	RD3	RD1	RD2	RD3	RD1	RD2	RD3	RD1	RD2	RD3	RD1	RD2	RD3	Pts
1	Volkswagen Dealer Team Sweden	**2**	2	**1**	**1**	**1**	**1**	1	**1**	**2**	**2**	**1**	1	2	1	3	2	**2**	2	**1**	**1**	1	671
1	Volkswagen Dealer Team Sweden	3	7	4	3	2	3	11	3	3	3	4	16	**Ret**	**DNS**	4	5	12	4	13	DSQ	8	671
2	(Sweden) SEAT Dealer Team - PWR Racing	1	**1**	2	4	3	5	**2**	2	1	4	2	2	1	3	**1**	**1**	1	**1**	4	8	3	586
2	(Sweden) SEAT Dealer Team - PWR Racing	4	4	3	8	4	10	7	10	5	5	3	13	8	4	2	3	14	3	6	Ret	Ret	586
3	(Sweden) Brink Motorsport	5	3	5	5	Ret	9	10	7	7	6	9	4	Ret	6	12	6	5	5	9	3	6	222
3	(Sweden) Brink Motorsport	11	Ret	6	7	Ret	DNS	12	11	14	8	16	5	Ret	Ret	Ret	9	Ret	9	10	7	Ret	222
4	(Sweden) Team Honda Racing	9	9	8	14	12	4	3	16	13	Ret	7	14	3	5	7	7	4	10	5	2	**2**	154
5	(Finland) Kart In Club Driving Academy				15	5	6	6	6	Ret	10	6	8	4	8	5	4	3	Ret				115
6	(Sweden) Lestrup Racing Team	15	5	Ret	10	8	7	5	5	4	Ret	Ret	12	11	11	13	18	Ret	6	2	6	4	109
7	(Sweden) Micke Kågered Racing	10	Ret	7	6	13	DNS	15	17	6	Ret	DNS	7	7	7	11	8	6	DSQ	3	4	5	101
8	(Sweden) Experion Racing Team	12	8	9	DSQ	9	Ret	9	18	Ret	Ret	8	6	5	9	9	14	DNS	DNS	Ret	DNS	DNS	54
9	(Sweden) Rent A Wreck Racing	8	Ret	10	12	Ret	Ret	14	DNS	DNS	12	17	17	Ret	13	16	11	8	7	12	5	12	33
10	(Sweden) TeamA Teknik	7	15	Ret	DNS	DNS	DNS	13	12	9	11	15	DNS	6	10	Ret	10	16	11	8	Ret	DNS	32
11	(Sweden) PWR Racing Junior Team	Ret	Ret	12				Ret	8	11	9	11	15	Ret	12	15	Ret	15	Ret	Ret	DNS	9	20
12	(Sweden) LMP Engineering	6	6	15																			16
13	(Sweden) PWR Racing Customer Team	Ret	12	14	18	14	13	16	15	15	14	12	11	12	15	14	15	11	12	11	Ret	10	14
14	(Finland) LMS Racing (Note: Only one car LMS Racing was declared in the team's championship.)	16	10	11	17	11	Ret	Ret	14	16	Ret	13	10				16	13	Ret				10
Teams ineligible to score points
	(Sweden) Brovallen Design	14	13	DNS	13	10	11	8	9	10	7	5	3	13	Ret	10	17	7	8	Ret	9	7	
	(Sweden) Brovallen Design																12	10	13				
Pos	Driver	KNU (Sweden)			ALA (Finland)			SOL (Sweden)			FAL (Sweden)			GEL (Sweden)			AND (Sweden)			MAN (Sweden)			Pts

Colour	Result
Gold	Winner
Silver	Second place
Bronze	Third place
Green	Points classification
Blue	Non-points classification
Blue	Non-classified finish (NC)
Purple	Retired, not classified (Ret)
Red	Did not qualify (DNQ)
Red	Did not pre-qualify (DNPQ)
Black	Disqualified (DSQ)
White	Did not start (DNS)
White	Withdrew (WD)
White	Race cancelled (C)
Blank	Did not practice (DNP)
Blank	Did not arrive (DNA)
Blank	Excluded (EX)

**Bold** – Pole

Italics – Fastest Lap
