= Åre Östersund Airport =

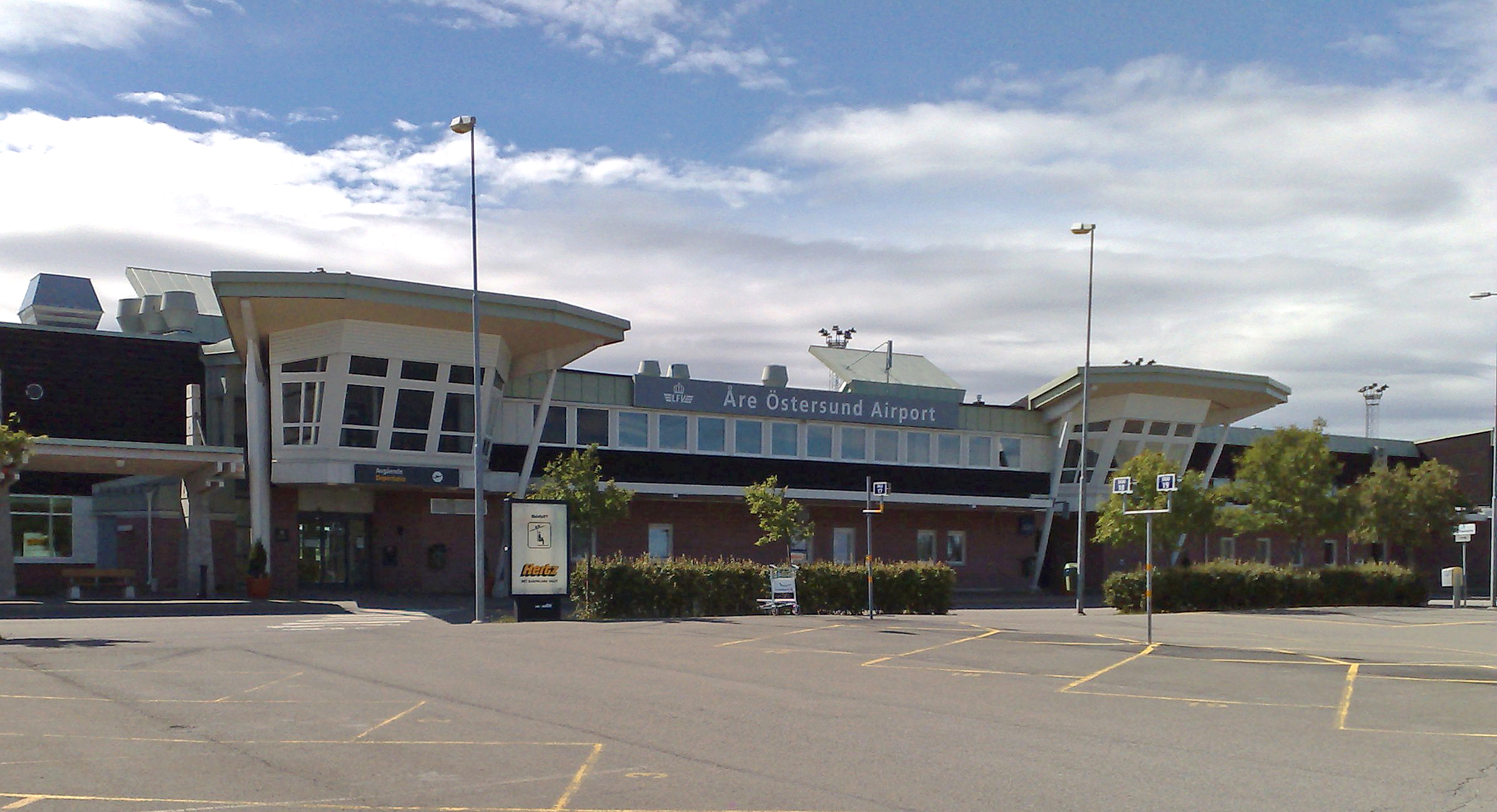
- IATA: OSD; ICAO: ESNZ

Summary
- Airport type: Public
- Operator: Swedavia
- Serves: Östersund & Åre
- Location: Frösön, Sweden
- Elevation AMSL: 1,233 ft (376 m)
- Coordinates: 63°11′39″N 14°30′07″E
- Website: www.swedavia.com/ostersund/

Map
- Location of airport in Jämtland OSD (Sweden)

Runways
Direction	Length		Surface
Direction	ft	m	Surface
12/30	8,202	2,500	Asphalt
~~12L/30R~~; Closed	~~4,034~~	~~1,230~~	~~Asphalt~~

Statistics (2015)
- Passengers total: 465,196
- International passengers: 20,696
- Domestic passengers: 444,500
- Landings total: 5,208
- Statistics: Swedavia

Åre Östersund Airport (IATA: OSD, ICAO: ESNZ), previously known as Östersund–Frösön Airport is located about 11 km (6.8 mi) west of Östersund, Sweden and 94 km (58 mi) east of Åre, Sweden. The airport opened in 1958.

Åre Östersund airport is an international airport and served 465,196 passengers in 2015.

== Airlines and destinations ==
The following airlines operate regular scheduled and charter flights at Åre Östersund Airport:

Airlines	Destinations
Jonair	Umeå
Norwegian Air Shuttle	Seasonal: Stockholm–Arlanda
Scandinavian Airlines	Stockholm–Arlanda; Seasonal: Copenhagen
Transavia	Seasonal charter: Amsterdam, Groningen

== Statistics ==
Busiest routes to and from Åre Östersund Airport (2019)
Rank	Airport	Passengers handled	% change 2018/19
1	Sweden, Stockholm-Arlanda, Stockholm-Bromma	428,988	▼8.0
2	United Kingdom, London-Gatwick	9,476	▲24.4
3	Sweden, Umeå	4,882	▼14.7
4	Spain, Gran Canaria	4,702	▼30.8
5	Spain, Palma de Mallorca	4,644	▲2.2

Countries with most handled passengers to/from Åre Östersund Airport (2019)
Rank	Country	Passengers	Change 2018/19
1	United Kingdom	10,705	▲32.3%
2	Spain	9,346	▼17.6%
3	Denmark	3,118	▼5.3%
4	Greece	2,702	▼35,7%
5	Turkey	2,504	▲NEW

Traffic by calendar year
Year	Passenger volume	Change	Domestic	Change	International	Change
2025	245,656	▲2.7%	228,954	▲1.0%	16,702	▲34.7%
2024	239,196	▼5.4%	226,798	▼7.7%	12,398	▲71.1%
2023	252,839	▲15.2%	245,591	▲15.7%	7,248	▲1.2%
2022	219,485	▲75.0%	212,326	▲72.5%	7,159	▲214.7%
2021	125,395	▼10.8%	123,120	▼5.7%	2,275	▼77.2%
2020	140,572	▼70.3%	130,590	▼70.4%	9,982	▼69.5%
2019	473,497	▼7.5%	440,772	▼8.4%	32,725	▲6.0%
2018	511,986	▼3.6%	481,111	▼5.0%	30,875	▲27.1%
2017	530,983	▲7.1%	506,687	▲4.8%	24,296	▲96.1%
2016	495,734	▲6.6%	483,342	▲8.7%	12,392	▼40.1%
2015	465,196	▲1.0%	444,500	▲2.3%	20,696	▼20.9%
2014	460,720	▲12.7%	434,552	▲13.2%	26,168	▲5.0%
2013	408,700	▲6.7%	383,770	▲6.8%	24,930	▲5.7%
2012	383,086		359,496		23,590	

== Ground transportation ==
=== Bus ===
Airport Coaches (Stadsbussarna) departs from the airport to down town Östersund. In the winter, Åre Flygtransfer departs in connection with every SAS and BRA flight, to and from Åre.

== Incidents and accidents ==
- On 9 September 2007 an MD83 took off for a charter flight bound for Antalya, Turkey. The plane was overloaded and left the runway very late and touched the landing light equipment that was placed outside the runway. It continued to Antalya where it landed normally.
- On 29 December 2019 an Easyjet A320 (G-EZWY) skidded off a taxiway, resulting in a 29-hour delay of the return flight to LGW as an engineering inspection was required

== Östersund Airport Circuit ==
On 2012 and 2013, Östersund Airport hosted a round of the Scandinavian Touring Car Championship and Porsche Carrera Cup Scandinavia, in which 1.930 km (1.199 mi) temporary airfield circuit was made within this airport for these races.

The fastest official race lap records at the Östersund Airport Circuit are listed as:

Category	Time	Driver	Vehicle	Event
Full Circuit (2012–2013): 1.930 km (1.199 mi)
Silhouette racing car	0:51.564	Robert Dahlgren	Volvo S60 TTA	2013 Östersund STCC round
Porsche Carrera Cup	0:51.845	Johan Kristoffersson	Porsche 911 (997 II) GT3 Cup	2012 Östersund Porsche Carrera Cup Scandinavia round
Formula Renault 1.6	0:54.568	Martin Rump	Signatech FR1.6	2013 Östersund Formula Renault 1.6 Nordic round
Super 2000	0:54.744	Tomas Engström	Honda Civic	2012 Östersund STCC round
Renault Clio Cup	0:59.929	Joakim Forsell	Renault Clio III RS	2012 Östersund Renault Clio Cup JTCC round

== See also ==
- List of the busiest airports in the Nordic countries
