= Solvalla Stockholm =

Motorsport race track in Stockholm, Sweden

Solvalla
- Location: Bromma, Stockholm, Sweden
- Coordinates: 59°22′03″N 17°56′23″E
- Opened: 21 September 2012; 13 years ago
- Closed: 17 June 2017; 8 years ago
- Major events: Scandinavian Touring Car Championship (2012–2017); Porsche Carrera Cup Scandinavia (2012–2013, 2015–2016)
- Website: http://solvalla.se/

Full Circuit (2012–2017)
- Length: 1.250 km (0.777 mi)
- Turns: 8
- Race lap record: 1:17.034 ( (Sweden) Thed Björk, Volvo S60 TTA, 2014, Silhouette racing car)

Solvalla Stockholm is a temporary motorsport race track in Sweden. The circuit is located in the Bromma district west of the Swedish capital Stockholm. Rather than using the streets of the city, the track itself will use the horse racing venue, making it the first stadium circuit in Sweden.

It was announced that the venue would host the final round of the 2012 Scandinavian Touring Car Championship season. The championship returned to Solvalla for the next five seasons, before being dropped from the calendar for the 2018 season.

== Lap records ==
The fastest official race lap records at the Solvalla are listed as:

Category	Time	Driver	Vehicle	Event
Full Circuit (2012–2017): 1.250 km (0.777 mi)
Silhouette racing car	0:43.262	Thed Björk	Volvo S60 TTA	2014 Solvalla STCC round
Porsche Carrera Cup	0:43.976	Philip Morin	Porsche 911 (991 I) GT3 Cup	2016 Solvalla Porsche Carrera Cup Scandinavia round
TCR Touring Car	0:44.832	Johan Kristoffersson	Volkswagen Golf GTI TCR	2017 Solvalla TCR STCC round
Formula Renault 1.6	0:46.942	Ralf Aron	Signatech FR1.6	2014 Solvalla Formula Renault 1.6 Nordic round
Renault Clio Cup	0:47.351	Ilmari Korpivaara	Renault Clio IV RS	2017 Solvalla Renault Clio Cup JTCC round
Super 2000	0:52.032	Johan Stureson	Volkswagen Scirocco STCC	2012 Solvalla STCC round
