= 2006 Swedish Touring Car Championship =

Seasons
- ← 2005 2007 →

The 2006 Swedish Touring Car Championship season was the 11th Swedish Touring Car Championship (STCC) season. In total nine racing weekends at six different circuits were held; each round comprising one race.

== Changes for 2006 ==
- The race format and points system was changed. During the 2006 season one race of 40 minutes was held each weekend. Each race had one mandatory pitstop.
- The points system changed to the standard FIA system of 10-8-6-5-4-3-2-1.
- A privateers championship named Caran Cup was created for drivers using cars constructed in 2003 or earlier.

== Teams and drivers ==
List of starting drivers for the 2006 Swedish Touringcar Championship season.

Team	Car	No.	Drivers
Drivers' Championship
Flash Engineering	BMW 320si E90	1	(Sweden) Richard Göransson
Flash Engineering	BMW 320si E90	4	(Sweden) Edward Sandström
Flash Engineering	BMW 320si E90	9	(Sweden) Jan Nilsson
Kristoffersson Motorsport	Audi A4	2	(Sweden) Thed Björk
Kristoffersson Motorsport	Audi A4	6	(Sweden) Fredrik Ekblom
Kristoffersson Motorsport	Audi A4	10	(Sweden) Tommy Kristoffersson
Crawford Racing	BMW 320si E90	3	(Sweden) Carl Rosenblad
Honda Engström Motorsport	Honda Accord	5	(Sweden) Tomas Engström
Polestar Racing	Volvo S60	7	(Sweden) Robert Dahlgren
Polestar Racing	Volvo S60	17	(Sweden) Alexander Storckenfeldt
Opel Team Sweden	Opel Astra GTC 2000	8	(Sweden) Nicklas Karlsson
West Coast Racing	BMW 320i	11	(Netherlands) Duncan Huisman
West Coast Racing	BMW 320i	12	(Sweden) Robin Rudholm
Mercedes-Benz Sport	Mercedes-Benz C200	14	(Sweden) Hans Simonsson
Mercedes-Benz Sport	Mercedes-Benz C200	15	(Sweden) Tobias Johansson
MA GP/Team caWalli	Alfa Romeo 156	20	(Sweden) Mattias Andersson
IPS Motorsport	Peugeot 407	21	(Sweden) Johan Stureson
IPS Motorsport	Peugeot 407	22	(Sweden) Stefan Söderberg
Picko Troberg Racing	BMW 320i	44	(Sweden) David Björk
STCC Challenge
Gellerstedt Motorsport	BMW 320i	94	(Sweden) Christer Gellerstedt
Malmborg Racing	Ford Focus	95	(Sweden) Håkan Malmborg
Tysslinge Racing	BMW 320R	97	(Sweden) Tobias Tegelby
Team Euromaster	BMW 320i	98	(Sweden) Joakim Fridh

== Race calendar ==
Round	Circuit	Date	Winning driver	Winning team
1	(Sweden) Ring Knutstorp	14 May	Thed Björk	Kristoffersson Motorsport
2	(Sweden) Karlskoga Motorstadion	28 May	Robert Dahlgren	Polestar Racing
3	(Sweden) Mantorp Park	18 June	Richard Göransson	Flash Engineering
4	(Sweden) Falkenbergs Motorbana	16 July	Thed Björk	Kristoffersson Motorsport
5	(Norway) Vålerbanen	30 July	Richard Göransson	Flash Engineering
6	(Sweden) Anderstorp	13 August	Richard Göransson	Flash Engineering
7	(Sweden) Karlskoga Motorstadion	27 August	Thed Björk	Kristoffersson Motorsport
8	(Sweden) Ring Knutstorp	10 September	Richard Göransson	Flash Engineering
9	(Sweden) Mantorp Park	1 October	Richard Göransson	Flash Engineering

== Championship standings (after 9 of 9 rounds) ==
=== Drivers ===
Pos	Driver	KNU (Sweden)	KAR (Sweden)	MAN (Sweden)	FAL (Sweden)	VÅL (Norway)	AND (Sweden)	KAR (Sweden)	KNU (Sweden)	MAN (Sweden)	Pts
1	(Sweden) T. Björk	1	3	7	1	2	16	1	2	4	59
2	(Sweden) Göransson	5	13	1	10	1	1	8	1	1	55
3	(Netherlands) Huisman	4	Ret	3	3		2	2	5	10	37
4	(Sweden) Ekblom	2	10	4	Ret	3	8	10	3	5	30
5	(Sweden) Engström	3	2	Ret	16	5	Ret	4	9	3	29
6	(Sweden) Dahlgren	Ret	1	Ret	2	12	3	Ret	6	7	29
7	(Sweden) Rudholm	14	5	2	11	6	9	3	7	6	26
8	(Sweden) Stureson	7	4	Ret	Ret	7	5	5	11	Ret	17
9	(Sweden) Nilsson	8	7	Ret	4	Ret	4	9	8	12	14
10	(Sweden) Kristoffersson	Ret	12	5	9	4	13	16	4	Ret	14
11	(Sweden) D. Björk	6	6	6	13	Ret	6	15	14	8	13
12	(Sweden) Rosenblad	9	11	Ret	7	10	10	7	10	2	12
13	(Sweden) Karlsson	Ret	8	Ret	Ret	9	7	6	15	13	6
14	(Sweden) Storckenfeldt	12	9	Ret	5	Ret	DSQ	11	13	9	4
15	(Sweden) Andersson	13	11	DNS	6	8	11	12	12	10	4
16	(Sweden) Fridh	Ret	15	8	15	Ret	12	14	17	15	1
17	(Sweden) Söderberg	11	18	9	8	Ret	Ret	Ret	Ret	Ret	1
18	(Sweden) Johansson	16	14	DNS	12	11	14	DNS	16	DNS	0
19	(Sweden) Simonsson	DNS	Ret	Ret	Ret	Ret	DNS	13	19	14	0
20	(Sweden) Tegelby	17	16	Ret	14	13	15	Ret	20	Ret	0
21	(Sweden) Gellerstedt	15	Ret	10	17		Ret	Ret	18	16	0
22	(Sweden) Sandström	10	17	Ret							0
23	(Sweden) Malmborg							Ret		Ret	0

Colour	Result
Gold	Winner
Silver	Second place
Bronze	Third place
Green	Points classification
Blue	Non-points classification
Blue	Non-classified finish (NC)
Purple	Retired, not classified (Ret)
Red	Did not qualify (DNQ)
Red	Did not pre-qualify (DNPQ)
Black	Disqualified (DSQ)
White	Did not start (DNS)
White	Withdrew (WD)
White	Race cancelled (C)
Blank	Did not practice (DNP)
Blank	Did not arrive (DNA)
Blank	Excluded (EX)

STCC Teams Championship
Position	Make	Points
1	KMS/Audi	65
2	Flash/BMW	64
3	WCR/BMW	54
4	Engström/Honda	38
5	Polestar/Volvo	35
6	IPS/Peugeot	30
7	Elgh/BMW	24
8	PTR/BMW	18
9	Dealer Team/Opel	10
10	MA GP/Alfa Romeo	9
11	MB Sport/PWR/Mercedes	1

STCC Manufacturers Championship
Position	Make	Points
1	BMW	72
2	Audi	68
3	Volvo	42
4	Honda	41
5	Peugeot	33
6	Alfa Romeo	20
7	Opel	18
8	Mercedes	8

Caran Cup
Position	Driver	Points
1	Joakim Frid	68
2	Tobias Tegelby	50
3	Christer Gellerstedt	32
