= 2004 Swedish Touring Car Championship =

Seasons
- ← 2003 2005 →

The 2004 Swedish Touring Car Championship season was the 9th Swedish Touring Car Championship (STCC) season. In total nine racing weekends at five different circuits were held; each round comprising two races, making an eighteen-round competition in total.

== Teams and drivers ==
Team	Car	No.	Drivers
Drivers' Championship
Kristoffersson Motorsport	Audi A4	1	(Sweden) Fredrik Ekblom
Kristoffersson Motorsport	Audi A4	6	(Sweden) Tommy Kristoffersson
Flash Engineering	Volvo S60	2	(Sweden) Jan Nilsson
Flash Engineering	Volvo S60	7	(Sweden) Robert Dahlgren
Engström Motorsport	Honda Civic Type-R	3	(Sweden) Tomas Engström
Engström Motorsport	Honda Civic Type-R	8	(Sweden) Jens Hellström
Opel Team Sweden	Opel Astra	4	(Norway) Tommy Rustad
West Coast Racing	BMW 320i	5	(Sweden) Richard Göransson
West Coast Racing	BMW 320i	9	(Sweden) Thed Björk
West Coast Racing	BMW 320i	11	(Sweden) Niklas Lovén
SEAT Sport	SEAT Toledo	10	(Sweden) Rickard Rydell
LMS Racing	Audi A4	12	(Finland) Olli Haapalainen
Team Italienska Bil	Alfa Romeo 156	20	(Sweden) Mattias Andersson
IPS Motorsport	Peugeot 307	21	(Sweden) Johan Stureson
Peugeot Statoil Motorsport	Peugeot 307	23	(Denmark) Jan Magnussen
STCC Challenge
Rosén Racing	Volvo S60	92	(Sweden) Tobbe Rosén
Landegren Motorsport	Volvo S60	93	(Sweden) Johan Landegren
Gellerstedt Motorsport	BMW 320i	94	(Sweden) Christer Gellerstedt
Lindblom Motorsport	Volvo S60	95	(Sweden) Jan Lindblom
Norén Racing	BMW 320i	96	(Sweden) Peo Norén
JN Racing	BMW 320i	97	(Sweden) Johan Nilsson
Team Gustavsson	Volvo S60	98	(Sweden) Joakim Gustavsson
Mälarpower	Volvo S40 Evo 5	99	(Sweden) Ronnie Brandt

== Race calendar and winners ==
Round	Circuit	Date	Winning driver	Winning team
1 2	(Sweden) Ring Knutstorp	1–2 May	Robert Dahlgren; Richard Göransson	Flash Engineering; West Coast Racing
3 4	(Sweden) Falkenbergs Motorbana	15–16 May	Jan Nilsson; Fredrik Ekblom	Flash Engineering; Kristoffersson Motorsport
5 6	(Sweden) Karlskoga Motorstadion	30–31 May	Richard Göransson; Richard Göransson	West Coast Racing; West Coast Racing
7 8	(Sweden) Mantorp Park	19–20 June	Robert Dahlgren; Rickard Rydell	Polestar Racing; SEAT Sport
9 10	(Sweden) Ring Knutstorp	3–4 July	Richard Göransson; Richard Göransson	West Coast Racing; West Coast Racing
11 12	(Sweden) Ring Knutstorp	17–18 July	Richard Göransson; Tommy Rustad	West Coast Racing; Opel Team Sweden
13 14	(Norway) Arctic Circle Raceway	31 July–1 August	Richard Göransson; Richard Göransson	West Coast Racing; West Coast Racing
15 16	(Sweden) Karlskoga Motorstadion	14–15 August	Robert Dahlgren; Tommy Rustad	Flash Engineering; Opel Team Sweden
17 18	(Sweden) Mantorp Park	18–19 September	Fredrik Ekblom; Richard Göransson	Kristoffersson Motorsport; West Coast Racing

== Championship results ==
=== Championship standings ===
Pos.	Driver	KNU (Sweden)		FAL (Sweden)		GEL (Sweden)		MAN (Sweden)		FAL (Sweden)		KNU (Sweden)		MIR (Norway)		GEL (Sweden)		MAN (Sweden)		Pts
1	(Sweden) Richard Göransson	3	1	3	12	1	1	12	6	1	1	1	3	1	1	2	9	7	1	227
2	(Sweden) Robert Dahlgren	1	11	2	4	2	4	1	7	2	3	10	9	3	5	1	2	Ret	8	176
3	(Sweden) Fredrik Ekblom	4	6	5	1	6	3	4	5	4	2	7	6	2	4	6	8	1	3	165
4	(Sweden) Jan Nilsson	2	2	1	5	4	Ret	9	Ret	3	Ret	4	2	5	3	Ret	6	2	13	137
5	(Norway) Tommy Rustad	Ret	4	4	7	5	DNS	Ret	3	8	6	3	1	4	2	3	1	6	Ret	137
6	(Sweden) Tomas Engström	9	10	6	2	3	2	3	Ret	6	Ret	5	4	6	10	14	10	4	2	128
7	(Sweden) Johan Stureson	5	3	Ret	DNS	9	5	2	2	7	5	2	5	14	6	10	7	Ret	Ret	107
8	(Sweden) Tommy Kristoffersson	8	13	8	6	10	Ret	8	8	5	4	9	8	8	8	7	4	8	5	102
9	(Sweden) Jens Hellström	6	7	Ret	8	7	Ret	7	Ret	Ret	9	8	7	9	9	8	5	Ret	6	80
10	(Sweden) Mattias Andersson	7	15	7	3	8	6	Ret	DNS	Ret	8	16	DNS	7	7	5	Ret	Ret	DNS	59
11	(Sweden) Thed Björk											Ret	14			4	3	3	4	48
12	(Sweden) Johan Landegren			9	11	11	7	6	4	10	7	17	Ret	10	11	9	15	13	Ret	48
13	(Sweden) Peo Norén	11	8	10	9	12	Ret	10	9	9	10	14	Ret	15	DNS			11	7	43
14	(Sweden) Johan Nilsson	12	12	12	13	15	8	11	10	13	13	12	10	11	12	11	11	DNS	10	30
15	(Sweden) Rickard Rydell							5	1											26
16	(Sweden) Christer Gellerstedt	13	DNS	DNS	10	13	9	Ret	DNS	11	11	11	11					18	9	23
17	(Sweden) Niklas Lovén	10	5	11	Ret	14	Ret	Ret	11											15
18	(Sweden) Tobbe Rosén									12	12	DNS	DNS	12	14	12	12	9	11	13
19	(Finland) Olli Haapalainen																	5	18	8
20	(Denmark) Jan Magnussen											6	15							7
21	(Sweden) Ronnie Brandt	Ret	DNS	DNS	DNS							13	12	13	13	13	13	10	12	6
22	(Sweden) Jan Lindblom	Ret	9																	4
23	(Sweden) Joakim Gustavsson	14	14	DNS	DNS					DNS	Ret	15	13					12	Ret	1

=== Driver's championship ===
Position	Driver	Points
1	Richard Göransson	227
2	Robert Dahlgren	176
3	Fredrik Ekblom	165
4	Jan Nilsson	137
5	Tommy Rustad	137
6	Tomas Engström	128
7	Johan Stureson	107
8	Tommy Kristoffersson	102
9	Jens Hellström	80
10	Mattias Andersson	59
11	Johan Landegren	48
12	Thed Björk	48
13	Peo Norén	43
14	Johan Nilsson	30
15	Rickard Rydell	26
16	Christer Gellerstedt	23
17	Niklas Lovén	15
18	Tobbe Rosén	13
19	Olli Happalainen	8
20	Jan Magnussen	7
21	Ronnie Brandt	6
22	Jan Lindblom	4
23	Joakim Gustavsson	1

=== STCC Challenge ===
Position	Driver	Points
1	Johan Nilsson	176
2	Johan Landegren	164
3	Peo Norén	129
4	Christer Gellerstedt	89
5	Tobbe Rosén (4 tävlingar)	59
6	Ronnie Brandt	58
7	Joakim Gustavsson	26
8	Jan Lindblom	12

=== Manufacturer's championship ===
Position	Manufacturer	Points
1	BMW	225
2	Volvo	206
3	Audi	176
4	Honda	150
5	Opel	142
6	Peugeot	120
7	Alfa Romeo	67
