= 2011 Scandinavian Touring Car Championship =

Seasons
- ← 2010 (Sweden); 2010 (Denmark) 2012 →

The 2011 Scandinavian Touring Car Championship season was the inaugural Scandinavian Touring Car Championship (STCC) season. The Scandinavian Touring Car Cup was awarded in 2010 to the driver with best results from selected races in the Danish and Swedish seasons.

== Teams and drivers ==
- The championship entry list was released on 16 March 2011.

Team	Car	No.	Drivers	Rounds
(Sweden) WestCoast Racing	BMW 320si	1	(Sweden) Richard Göransson	1, 4–9
(Sweden) WestCoast Racing	BMW 320si	66	(Sweden) Martin Öhlin	All
(Sweden) Polestar Racing	Volvo C30	2	(United Kingdom) James Thompson	1–5
(Sweden) Polestar Racing	Volvo C30	3	(Italy) Gabriele Tarquini	6–7
(Sweden) Polestar Racing	Volvo C30	4	(Sweden) Robert Dahlgren	8–9
(Sweden) Polestar Racing	Volvo C30	7	(Norway) Tommy Rustad	All
(Sweden) Flash Engineering	BMW 320si	5	(United Kingdom) Colin Turkington	All
(Sweden) Flash Engineering	BMW 320si	50	(Sweden) Jan Nilsson	All
(Sweden) Flash Engineering	BMW 320si	95	(Sweden) Daniel Roos	9
(Denmark) Team Bygma	SEAT León	6	(Denmark) Jason Watt	1–2, 7–8
(Sweden) SEAT Dealer Team/Brovallen	SEAT León	8	(Sweden) Roger Eriksson	All
(Sweden) SEAT Dealer Team/Brovallen	SEAT León	90	(Sweden) Tobias Johansson	All
Chevrolet Motorsport Sweden	Chevrolet Cruze	10	(Denmark) Michel Nykjær	8–9
Chevrolet Motorsport Sweden	Chevrolet Cruze	11	(Sweden) Rickard Rydell	All
Chevrolet Motorsport Sweden	Chevrolet Cruze	12	(Sweden) Viktor Hallrup	All
(Sweden) Biogas.se	Volkswagen Scirocco	14	(Sweden) Fredrik Ekblom	All
(Sweden) Biogas.se	Volkswagen Scirocco	15	(Sweden) Patrik Olsson	All
(Sweden) Biogas.se	Volkswagen Scirocco	41	(Sweden) Johan Kristoffersson	5–9
(Sweden) Biogas.se	Volkswagen Scirocco	42	(Sweden) Alexander Graff	4
(Sweden) Biogas.se	Volkswagen Scirocco	51	(Sweden) Thed Björk	9
(Sweden) Seco Tools Racing Team	Honda Accord	17	(Sweden) Tomas Engström	1–4, 6, 9
(Denmark) Hartmann Racing	Honda Accord	18	(Italy) Fabrizio Giovanardi	7
(Denmark) Hartmann Racing	Honda Accord	87	(Denmark) Casper Elgaard	7
(Sweden) MA:GP/IPS Motorsport	Alfa Romeo 156	20	(Sweden) Mattias Andersson	All
(Sweden) MA:GP/IPS Motorsport	BMW 320si	21	(Sweden) Johan Stureson	All
(Sweden) Danielsson Motorsport	SEAT León	26	(Sweden) Jens Hellström	5
(Sweden) Danielsson Motorsport	SEAT León	27	(Sweden) Alx Danielsson	2–3, 5, 9
(Sweden) Danielsson Motorsport	SEAT León	28	(Sweden) Tommy Lindroth	2
(Sweden) Danielsson Motorsport	SEAT León	29	(Norway) Thomas Faraas	3
(Sweden) Danielsson Motorsport	SEAT León	88	(Sweden) Robin Appelqvist	9
(Sweden) Appelqvist Racing	Alfa Romeo 156 GTA	88	(Sweden) Robin Appelqvist	2–3, 6
(Sweden) Team Pansar Motorsport	Alfa Romeo 156	89	(Sweden) Claes Hoffsten	9
(Sweden) Ebbesson Motorsport	BMW 320si	96	(Sweden) Andreas Ebbesson	1–6, 8–9
(Sweden) BMS Event	BMW 320i	97	(Sweden) Joakim Ahlberg	All

== Race calendar and results ==
The calendar for the 2011 STCC season was released on 8 November 2010.

Round		Circuit	Date	Pole position	Fastest lap	Winning driver	Winning team
1	R1	(Denmark) Jyllands-Ringen	23 April	(Norway) Tommy Rustad	(Sweden) Richard Göransson	(Denmark) Jason Watt	(Denmark) Jason Watt Racing
1	R2	(Denmark) Jyllands-Ringen	23 April		(Sweden) Johan Stureson	(Sweden) Johan Stureson	(Sweden) MA:GP/IPS Motorsport
2	R3	(Sweden) Ring Knutstorp	7 May	(Sweden) Fredrik Ekblom	(Sweden) Fredrik Ekblom	(Sweden) Fredrik Ekblom	(Sweden) Biogas.se
2	R4	(Sweden) Ring Knutstorp	7 May		(Sweden) Martin Öhlin	(Sweden) Mattias Andersson	(Sweden) MA:GP/IPS Motorsport
3	R5	(Sweden) Mantorp Park	21 May	(Sweden) Fredrik Ekblom	(Sweden) Jan Nilsson	(Sweden) Fredrik Ekblom	(Sweden) Biogas.se
3	R6	(Sweden) Mantorp Park	21 May		(Sweden) Jan Nilsson	(Sweden) Jan Nilsson	(Sweden) Flash Engineering
4	R7	(Sweden) Göteborg City Race	18 June	(Sweden) Rickard Rydell	(Sweden) Rickard Rydell	(Sweden) Rickard Rydell	Chevrolet Motorsport Sweden
4	R8	(Sweden) Göteborg City Race	18 June		(Sweden) Rickard Rydell	(Sweden) Richard Göransson	(Sweden) WestCoast Racing
5	R9	(Sweden) Falkenbergs Motorbana	2 July	(Sweden) Fredrik Ekblom	(Sweden) Richard Göransson	(Sweden) Fredrik Ekblom	(Sweden) Biogas.se
5	R10	(Sweden) Falkenbergs Motorbana	2 July		(Norway) Tommy Rustad	(Sweden) Jan Nilsson	(Sweden) Flash Engineering
6	R11	(Sweden) Karlskoga Motorstadion	13 August	(Sweden) Richard Göransson	(Sweden) Richard Göransson	(Sweden) Richard Göransson	(Sweden) WestCoast Racing
6	R12	(Sweden) Karlskoga Motorstadion	13 August		(Sweden) Richard Göransson	(Sweden) Richard Göransson	(Sweden) WestCoast Racing
7	R13	(Denmark) Jyllands-Ringen	28 August	(Norway) Tommy Rustad	(Norway) Tommy Rustad	(Norway) Tommy Rustad	(Sweden) Polestar Racing
7	R14	(Denmark) Jyllands-Ringen	28 August		(Sweden) Richard Göransson	(Italy) Fabrizio Giovanardi	(Denmark) Hartmann Racing
8	R15	(Sweden) Ring Knutstorp	10 September	(Sweden) Rickard Rydell	(Sweden) Rickard Rydell	(Sweden) Rickard Rydell	Chevrolet Motorsport Sweden
8	R16	(Sweden) Ring Knutstorp	10 September		(Norway) Tommy Rustad	(Norway) Tommy Rustad	(Sweden) Polestar Racing
9	R17	(Sweden) Mantorp Park	24 September	(Sweden) Rickard Rydell	(Denmark) Michel Nykjær	(Sweden) Rickard Rydell	Chevrolet Motorsport Sweden
9	R18	(Sweden) Mantorp Park	24 September		(Sweden) Rickard Rydell	(Sweden) Robert Dahlgren	(Sweden) Polestar Racing

== Championship standings ==
The points system used for both the main championship and Semcon Cup is the new FIA system of 25–18–15–12–10–8–6–4–2–1, awarded to the top ten finishers of each race.

=== Drivers championship ===
Pos	Driver	JYL (Denmark)		KNU (Sweden)		MAN (Sweden)		GÖT (Sweden)		FAL (Sweden)		KAR (Sweden)		JYL (Denmark)		KNU (Sweden)		MAN (Sweden)		Pts
Overall
1	(Sweden) Rickard Rydell	4	5	3	Ret	2	4	1	5	3	5	5	4	Ret	5	1	6	1	4	229
2	(Sweden) Fredrik Ekblom	11	10	1	6	1	6	2	3	1	8	3	5	3	10	2	7	2	3	227
3	(Norway) Tommy Rustad	2	13	2	5	6	2	7	4	14	7	2	Ret	1	13	8	1	DNS	11	168
4	(Sweden) Johan Stureson	6	1	7	2	15†	11	5	11	7	2	6	2	5	15	7	5	13	8	147
5	(United Kingdom) Colin Turkington	7	2	6	3	Ret	10	11	10	4	3	16†	9	2	Ret	6	2	12	6	130
6	(Sweden) Richard Göransson	Ret	DNS					8	1	2	6	1	1	Ret	6	Ret	16†	9	19	115
7	(Sweden) Mattias Andersson	8	4	8	1	Ret	12	12	12	Ret	DNS	15†	10	6	2	13	Ret	8	2	94
8	(Sweden) Jan Nilsson	9	6	10	7	7	1	10	8	8	1	Ret	6	10	11	15	Ret	10	21†	92
9	(Sweden) Patrik Olsson	10	Ret	5	4	9	8	14	7	5	4	14†	8	Ret	8	Ret	10	4	5	88
10	(Sweden) Johan Kristoffersson									Ret	Ret	4	7	4	4	5	3	3	9	84
11	(Sweden) Roger Eriksson	5	3	9	Ret	4	7	9	9	Ret	10	8	3	11	16†	12	9	22†	20†	71
12	(United Kingdom) James Thompson	3	8	18†	11	5	5	3	6	Ret	9									64
13	(Sweden) Tomas Engström	12	11	11	Ret	3	3	4	2			10	Ret					14	14	61
14	(Sweden) Robert Dahlgren															3	4	6	1	60
15	(Sweden) Martin Öhlin	Ret	7	4	10	14	9	13	13	12	Ret	7	11	7	3	9	8	Ret	12	54
16	(Italy) Fabrizio Giovanardi													8	1					29
17	(Denmark) Jason Watt	1	Ret	12	9									12	Ret	Ret	DNS			27
18	(Denmark) Michel Nykjær															4	15	5	18	22
19	(Sweden) Viktor Hallrup	DNS	DNS	13	15†	10	15†	6	Ret	13	Ret	12	15	13	7	10	11	11	15	16
20	(Sweden) Thed Björk																	7	7	12
21	(Sweden) Andreas Ebbesson	13	9	16	8	13	Ret	16	15	9	11	9	14			14	12	19	17	10
22	(Sweden) Tobias Johansson	14	12	15	Ret	11	DSQ	15	17	6	14†	Ret	12	14	14	Ret	13	16	13	8
23	(Sweden) Alx Danielsson			14	12	8	Ret			Ret	DNS							15	10	5
24	(Italy) Gabriele Tarquini											11	13	Ret	9					2
25	(Denmark) Casper Elgaard													9	Ret					2
26	(Sweden) Jens Hellström									10	12									1
27	(Sweden) Joakim Ahlberg	15	14	17	13	16†	14	18†	14	11	13	13	Ret	15	12	11	14	18	16	0
28	(Norway) Thomas Faraas					12	13													0
29	(Sweden) Tommy Lindroth			Ret	14															0
30	(Sweden) Alexander Graff							17	16											0
31	(Sweden) Robin Appelqvist			Ret	Ret	Ret	16					DNS	DNS					20	Ret	0
32	(Sweden) Daniel Roos																	17	22†	0
33	(Sweden) Claes Hoffsten																	21	Ret	0
Semcon Cup
1	(Sweden) Joakim Ahlberg	15	14	17	13	16†	14	18†	14	11	13	13	Ret	15	12	11	14	18	16	310
2	(Sweden) Andreas Ebbesson	13	9	16	8	13	Ret	16	15	9	11	9	14			14	12	19	17	303
3	(Sweden) Tobias Johansson	14	12	15	Ret	11	DSQ	15	17	6	14†	Ret	12	14	14	Ret	13	16	13	302
4	(Sweden) Daniel Roos																	17	22†	30
5	(Sweden) Robin Appelqvist			Ret	Ret	Ret	16					DNS	DNS					20	Ret	28
Pos	Driver	JYL (Denmark)		KNU (Sweden)		MAN (Sweden)		GÖT (Sweden)		FAL (Sweden)		KAR (Sweden)		JYL (Denmark)		KNU (Sweden)		MAN (Sweden)		Pts

Colour	Result
Gold	Winner
Silver	Second place
Bronze	Third place
Green	Points classification
Blue	Non-points classification
Blue	Non-classified finish (NC)
Purple	Retired, not classified (Ret)
Red	Did not qualify (DNQ)
Red	Did not pre-qualify (DNPQ)
Black	Disqualified (DSQ)
White	Did not start (DNS)
White	Withdrew (WD)
White	Race cancelled (C)
Blank	Did not practice (DNP)
Blank	Did not arrive (DNA)
Blank	Excluded (EX)

† — Drivers did not finish the race, but were classified as they completed over 90% of the race distance.

=== Teams championship ===
Pos	Team	JYL (Denmark)		KNU (Sweden)		MAN (Sweden)		GÖT (Sweden)		FAL (Sweden)		KAR (Sweden)		JYL (Denmark)		KNU (Sweden)		MAN (Sweden)		Pts
1	(Sweden) Biogas.se	10	10	1	4	1	6	2	3	1	4	3	5	3	8	2	7	2	3	327
1	(Sweden) Biogas.se	11	Ret	5	6	9	8	14	7	5	8	14†	8	Ret	10	Ret	10	4	5	327
2	(Sweden) Polestar Racing	2	8	2	5	5	2	3	4	14	7	2	13	1	9	3	1	6	1	312
2	(Sweden) Polestar Racing	3	13	18†	11	6	5	7	6	Ret	9	11	Ret	Ret	13	8	4	DNS	11	312
3	(Sweden) MA:GP/IPS Motorsport	6	1	7	1	15†	11	5	11	7	2	6	2	5	2	7	5	8	2	266
3	(Sweden) MA:GP/IPS Motorsport	8	4	8	2	Ret	12	12	12	Ret	DNS	15†	10	6	15	13	Ret	13	8	266
4	Chevrolet Motorsport Sweden	4	5	3	15†	2	4	1	5	3	5	5	4	13	5	1	6	1	4	263
4	Chevrolet Motorsport Sweden	DNS	DNS	13	Ret	10	15†	6	Ret	13	Ret	12	15	Ret	7	10	11	11	15	263
5	(Sweden) Flash Engineering	7	2	6	3	7	1	10	8	4	1	16	6	2	11	6	2	10	6	239
5	(Sweden) Flash Engineering	9	6	10	7	Ret	10	11	10	8	3	Ret	9	10	Ret	15	Ret	12	21†	239
6	(Sweden) WestCoast Racing	Ret	7	4	10	14	9	8	1	2	6	1	1	7	3	9	8	9	12	192
6	(Sweden) WestCoast Racing	Ret	DNS					13	13	12	Ret	7	11	Ret	6	Ret	16†	Ret	19	192
7	(Sweden) SEAT Dealer Team	5	3	9	Ret	4	7	9	9	Ret	10	8	3	11	16†	12	9	22†	20†	78
8	(Sweden) Seco Tools Racing Team	12	11	11	Ret	3	3	4	2			10	Ret					14	14	65
9	(Denmark) Hartmann Racing													8	1					35
9	(Denmark) Hartmann Racing													9	Ret					35
10	(Denmark) Team Bygma	1	Ret	12	9									12	Ret	Ret	DNS			29
11	(Sweden) Danielsson Motorsport			14	12	8	13			10	12							15	10	12
11	(Sweden) Danielsson Motorsport			Ret	14	12	Ret			Ret	DNS							20	Ret	12
Pos	Team	JYL (Denmark)		KNU (Sweden)		MAN (Sweden)		GÖT (Sweden)		FAL (Sweden)		KAR (Sweden)		JYL (Denmark)		KNU (Sweden)		MAN (Sweden)		Pts

Colour	Result
Gold	Winner
Silver	Second place
Bronze	Third place
Green	Points classification
Blue	Non-points classification
Blue	Non-classified finish (NC)
Purple	Retired, not classified (Ret)
Red	Did not qualify (DNQ)
Red	Did not pre-qualify (DNPQ)
Black	Disqualified (DSQ)
White	Did not start (DNS)
White	Withdrew (WD)
White	Race cancelled (C)
Blank	Did not practice (DNP)
Blank	Did not arrive (DNA)
Blank	Excluded (EX)
