= 2005 Swedish Touring Car Championship =

International automotive racing competition

Seasons
- ← 2004 2006 →

The 2005 Swedish Touring Car Championship season was the 10th Swedish Touring Car Championship (STCC) season. In total eight racing weekends at six different circuits were held; each round comprising three races, making a twenty-four round competition in total.

== Changes for 2005 ==
- The race format of qualifying and two races per weekend were removed. Instead two short sprints would be raced, and the combined results of those two races would determine the grid for the third, longer race.
- Points were awarded to the top six grid positions for the long race (the six drivers that succeeded the most in the qualification races): 6-5-4-3-2-1.
- The longer race gave points by the system 20-17-14-11-9-7-5-3-2-1.
- Grid positions for the first qualification race was decided by randomly drawing the driver's starting numbers from a cup. This grid was then reversed for the second qualification race. The drawings were later replaced by a one-lap shootout for the quickest time after teams put pressure on the organisation.
- Extra ballast weight were given to the top four drivers of the championship and the top four long race winners by the system 1st: +20 kg, 2nd: +15 kg, 3rd: +10 kg and 4th: +5 kg. Maximum extra weight was set to 40 kg. Weight gained from the long race stayed for one weekend after the gaining of the weight and was then removed from the car.
- Tyres were limited to 20 slick tyres per weekend, whereof 8 of these 20 were allowed to be new tyres.
- TV coverage was extended, with Viasat Sport/ZTV covering three and a half hours live action from each race weekend
- STCC AB had a board change. Mike Luff, Sven-Göte Svensson, Håkan Junfors and Lars Frisell were replaced by Tommy Theorin, Joakim Wiedesheim and Christer Johansson.

== Teams and drivers ==
Team	Car	No.	Drivers
Drivers' Championship
West Coast Racing	BMW 320i	1	(Sweden) Richard Göransson
West Coast Racing	BMW 320i	11	(Sweden) Thed Björk
Polestar Racing	Volvo S60	2	(Sweden) Robert Dahlgren
Polestar Racing	Volvo S60	7	(Sweden) Edward Sandström
Kristoffersson Motorsport	Audi A4	3	(Sweden) Fredrik Ekblom
Kristoffersson Motorsport	Audi A4	8	(Sweden) Tommy Kristoffersson
Flash Engineering	BMW 320i	4	(Sweden) Jan Nilsson
Opel Team Sweden	Opel Astra	5	(Norway) Tommy Rustad
Engström Motorsport	Honda Accord	6	(Sweden) Tomas Engström
Engström Motorsport	Honda Civic Type-R	9	(Sweden) Jens Hellström
Team Agrol	Honda Civic Type-R	10	(Sweden) Daniel Haglöf
Mercedes-Benz Sport	Mercedes C200	12	(Sweden) Tobias Johansson
Mercedes-Benz Sport	Mercedes C200	14	(Sweden) Hans Simonsson
Team Italienska Bil	Alfa Romeo 156	20	(Sweden) Mattias Andersson
IPS Motorsport	Peugeot 407	21	(Sweden) Johan Stureson
STCC Challenge
Budda Racing	Volvo S60	93	(Sweden) Patrik Andersson
Gellerstedt Motorsport	BMW 320i	94	(Sweden) Christer Gellerstedt
Johansson Motorsport	BMW 320 D E46	95	(Sweden) Håkan Johansson
JN Racing	BMW 320i	97	(Sweden) Johan Nilsson
Team Gustavsson	Volvo S60	98	(Sweden) Joakim Gustavsson
Mälarpower	Volvo S40 Evo 5	99	(Sweden) Ronnie Brandt

== Race calendar and winners ==
Round	Circuit	Date	Winning driver	Winning team
1 2	(Sweden) Ring Knutstorp	22 May	Tommy Rustad; Thed Björk	Opel Team Sweden; West Coast Racing
3 4	(Sweden) Karlskoga Motorstadion	6 June	Jan Nilsson; Tomas Engström	Flash Engineering; Engström Motorsport
5 6	(Sweden) Anderstorp	19 June	Johan Stureson; Edward Sandström	IPS Motorsport; Polestar Racing
7 8	(Sweden) Falkenbergs Motorbana	10 July	Robert Dahlgren; Robert Dahlgren	Polestar Racing; Polestar Racing
9 10	(Sweden) Ring Knutstorp	7 August	Robert Dahlgren; Johan Stureson	Polestar Racing; IPS Motorsport
11 12	(Sweden) Karlskoga Motorstadion	21 August	Fredrik Ekblom; Thed Björk	Kristoffersson Motorsport; West Coast Racing
13 14	(Norway) Våler	4 September	Tomas Engström; Richard Göransson	Engström Motorsport; West Coast Racing
15 16	(Sweden) Mantorp	18 September	Richard Göransson; Richard Göransson	West Coast Racing; West Coast Racing

== Championship results ==
=== Championship standings ===
Pos.	Driver	KNU (Sweden)	GEL (Sweden)	AND (Sweden)	FAL (Sweden)	KNU (Sweden)	GEL (Sweden)	GEL (Norway)	MAN (Sweden)	Pts
1	(Sweden) Richard Göransson	2	8	8	2	3	2	1	1	169
2	(Sweden) Thed Björk	1	3	3	6	DNS	1	2	3	141
3	(Sweden) Johan Stureson	10	2	2	11	1	9	7	2	117
4	(Sweden) Edward Sandström	4	9	1	4	5	DNS	Ret	4	97
5	(Sweden) Tomas Engström	7	1	6	3	11	4	8	7	87
6	(Sweden) Fredrik Ekblom	5	5	10	5	4	3	Ret	17	73
7	(Sweden) Robert Dahlgren	13	11	Ret	1	2	7	Ret	6	71
8	(Norway) Tommy Rustad	3	Ret	Ret	10	10	5	Ret	5	67
9	(Sweden) Jan Nilsson	9	4	14	7	6	10	4	8	49
10	(Sweden) Tommy Kristoffersson	6	10	5	9	8	8	3	11	41
11	(Sweden) Daniel Haglöf	11	7	4	12	9	Ret	5	10	30
12	(Sweden) Mattias Andersson	8	Ret	7	8	14	6	10	9	25
13	(Sweden) Jens Hellström	12	6	9	Ret	7	11	6	12	21
14	(Sweden) Ronnie Brandt		Ret	Ret	16	16	14	9	16	2
15	(Sweden) Johan Nilsson	14	13	11		17	12		13	0
16	(Sweden) Christer Gellerstedt								14	0
17	(Sweden) Joakim Gustavsson	15		13	15	15			15	0
18	(Sweden) Tobias Johansson			Ret	13	13	DNS	Ret	Ret	0
19	(Sweden) Håkan Johansson				Ret		13		DNS	0
20	(Sweden) Hans Simonsson		12		14	12	DNS	Ret	DNS	0
21	(Sweden) Patrik Andersson				12					0

=== Driver's championship ===
Position	Driver	Points
1	Richard Göransson	169
2	Thed Björk	141
3	Johan Stureson	117
4	Edward Sandström	97
5	Tomas Engström	87
6	Fredrik Ekblom	73
7	Robert Dahlgren	71
8	Tommy Rustad	67
9	Jan Nilsson	49
10	Tommy Kristoffersson	41
11	Daniel Haglöf	30
12	Mattias Andersson	25
13	Jens Hellström	21
14	Ronnie Brandt	2

=== STCC Challenge ===
Position	Driver	Points
1	Johan Nilsson	168
2	Ronnie Brandt	124
3	Joakim Gustavsson	97
4	Christer Gellerstedt	44
5	Håkan Johansson	26
6	Patrik Andersson	22

=== Manufacturer's championship ===
Position	Manufacturer	Points
1	BMW	159
2	Peugeot	120
3	Volvo	120
4	Honda	115
5	Audi	104
6	Alfa Romeo	68
