= 2003 Swedish Touring Car Championship =

Seasons
- ← 2002 2004 →

The 2003 Swedish Touring Car Championship season was the 8th Swedish Touring Car Championship (STCC) season. In total eight racing weekends at four different circuits were held; each round comprising two races, making a sixteen-round competition in total.

== Changes for 2003 ==
- The Supertouring regulations were removed and replaced with Super2000.
- The pitstops were also removed
- Each round were to consist of two races, with one sprint race of 15–25 minutes and one super-race approximately 15–30 minutes longer.
- Qualifying was conducted by having a standard qualifying session followed by a one-lap Superpole for the 8 fastest drivers.
- The top 15 finishers were awarded points: 20-17-15-13-11-10-9-8-7-6-5-4-3-2-1.

== Teams and drivers ==
Team	Car	No.	Drivers
Kristoffersson Motorsport	Audi A4 B6/7	1	(Sweden) Tommy Kristoffersson
Kristoffersson Motorsport	Audi A4 B6/7	8	(Sweden) Tobias Johansson
Kristoffersson Motorsport	Audi A4 B6/7	10	(Sweden) Fredrik Ekblom
Flash Engineering	Volvo S60	2	(Sweden) Jan Nilsson
Flash Engineering	Volvo S60	4	(Sweden) Magnus Krokström
WestCoast Racing	BMW 320i	3	(Sweden) Mattias Andersson
WestCoast Racing	BMW 320i	11	(Sweden) Richard Göransson
Engström Motorsport	Honda Civic Type-R	5	(Sweden) Tomas Engström
Crawford Racing	BMW 320i	6	(Sweden) Carl Rosenblad
Opel Team Sweden	Opel Astra	7	(Norway) Tommy Rustad
Podium SEAT Sport Team	SEAT Toledo	9	(Sweden) Robin Rudholm
Podium SEAT Sport Team	SEAT Toledo	12	(Sweden) Johan Stureson
Bakajev Motorsport	BMW 320i	15	(Sweden) Patrik Ernstsson
Bakajev Motorsport	BMW 320i	16	(Sweden) Jan Brunstedt
Euroracing	Alfa Romeo 156	17	(Sweden) Nicklas Karlsson
Peugeot Statoil Motorsport	Peugeot 307	19	(Sweden) Jens Edman
Vic Lee Racing	Peugeot 406 Coupé	24	(Norway) Roger Möen

== Race calendar and winners ==
All rounds were held in Sweden.

Round	Circuit	Date	Winning driver	Winning team
1 2	Falkenbergs Motorbana	4 May	Fredrik Ekblom; Richard Göransson	Kristoffersson Motorsport; West Coast Racing
3 4	Mantorp Park	18 May	Jan Nilsson; Fredrik Ekblom	Flash Engineering; Kristoffersson Motorsport
5 6	Karlskoga Motorstadion	9 June	Richard Göransson; Tomas Engström	West Coast Racing; Engström Motorsport
7 8	Falkenbergs Motorbana	6 July	Jan Nilsson; Patrik Ernstsson	Flash Engineering; Bakajev Motorsport
9 10	Ring Knutstorp	20 July	Richard Göransson; Jan Nilsson	West Coast Racing; Flash Engineering
11 12	Karlskoga Motorstadion	17 August	Richard Göransson; Carl Rosenblad	West Coast Racing; Crawford Racing
13 14	Ring Knutstorp	31 August	Tommy Rustad; Jan Nilsson	Opel Team Sweden; Flash Engineering
15 16	Mantorp Park	18 September	Richard Göransson; Nicklas Karlsson	West Coast Racing; Euroracing

== Championship results ==
=== Drivers' championship ===
Pos.	Driver	FAL		MAN		GEL		FAL		KNU		GEL		KNU		MAN		Pts
1	(Sweden) Fredrik Ekblom	1	3	2	1	3	4	2	10	2	2	3	8	3	11	2	7	224
2	(Sweden) Jan Nilsson	3	2	1	2	5	Ret	1	Ret	Ret	1	9	10	2	1	6	2	214
3	(Sweden) Tomas Engström	4	7	3	Ret	4	1	5	9	Ret	Ret	2	Ret	5	9	3	3	168
4	(Norway) Tommy Rustad	Ret	6	4	5	6	2	3	5	6	4	11	7	1	2	Ret	DNS	161
5	(Sweden) Richard Göransson	8	1	DNS	Ret	1	Ret	Ret	DNS	1	Ret	1	2	6	4	1	Ret	148
6	(Sweden) Tobias Johansson	6	4	5	3	9	6	8	Ret	5	5	6	3	8	10	11	Ret	140
7	(Sweden) Tommy Kristoffersson	10	DNS	Ret	4	7	12	4	4	9	7	5	5	4	5	13	8	139
8	(Sweden) Carl Rosenblad	Ret	DNS	Ret	7	11	13	7	3	3	8	4	1	10	12	9	5	136
9	(Sweden) Nicklas Karlsson	5	5	Ret	DNS	2	3	Ret	Ret	DNS	DNS	7	4			5	1	127
10	(Sweden) Patrik Ernstson	Ret	DNS	10	11	10	5	10	1	Ret	6	DNS	6	12	6	8	6	116
11	(Sweden) Johan Stureson	7	8	7	6	12	10	9	6	Ret	DNS	8	Ret	9	3	4	Ret	106
12	(Sweden) Magnus Krokström	Ret	Ret	11	8	8	7	DNS	7	7	3	10	9	7	8	10	Ret	99
13	(Sweden) Mattias Andersson	Ret	Ret	6	Ret	14	9	6	2	4	Ret	12	Ret	13	7	12	9	93
14	(Sweden) Robin Rudholm	11	Ret	9	9	15	11	11	Ret	10	9	13	Ret	11	Ret	7	4	86
15	(Sweden) Jan Brunstedt	9	9	8	10	13	8	12	8	8	11	Ret	Ret			14	10	78
16	(Sweden) Jens Edman	2	Ret															17
17	(Norway) Roger Moen							DNS	DNS	DNS	10							6
	(Norway) Ronnie Brandt											Ret	DNS					0

=== Manufacturer's championship ===
Position	Manufacturer	Points
1	Volvo	242
2	Audi	240
3	BMW	229
4	SEAT	184
5	Honda	181
