= Scandinavian Touring Car Championship =

Racing championship in Northern Europe

- Category: Touring cars
- Country: Scandinavia
- Inaugural season: 2011
- Drivers: 17
- Teams: 15
- Constructors: 3
- Tyre suppliers: Yokohama
- Drivers' champion: (Sweden) Mikael Karlsson
- Official website: stcc.se

The Scandinavian Touring Car Championship (STCC) is a touring car racing series based in Scandinavia. The series took over from the Danish Touringcar Championship and Swedish Touring Car Championship, with its first season in 2011. The Scandinavian Touring Car Cup was awarded in 2010 to the driver with best results from selected races in the Danish and Swedish seasons.

In 2013, the series merged with the rival TTA – Racing Elite League, which was formed as a result of the split in 2012. From the 2013 season onwards, the series would see a new format based upon the TTA series.

After the change to the TCR ruleset 2017, The follow-up series is the TCR Scandinavia Touring Car Championship. For the 2019 season STCC changed promotor to a constellation called Scandinavian Racing League (SRL). For season 2020 and forward STCC brand and championship changed promotor again to SNB-events AB.

The championship switched format for 2023 with the all-electric EPWR regulations, but delays in deliveries of the new race cars meant that the debut was pushed to 2024.

The promoter SNB Events AB withdrew at the end of the 2024 season, leaving the championship in a two-year hiatus.

The championship returns for 2027 under new ownership consisting of four Swedish circuits, Gelleråsen Arena, Mantorp Park, Ljungbyheds Motorbana and Ring Knutstorp. STCC will move away from touring cars for the first time, instead introducing GT4 regulations, running under the STCC GT4 Nordic banner.

== Champions ==
Season	Series Name	Driver	Car	Team
2011	Scandinavian Touring Car Championship	(Sweden) Rickard Rydell	Chevrolet Cruze	Chevrolet Motorsport Sweden
2012	Scandinavian Touring Car Championship	(Sweden) Johan Kristoffersson	Volkswagen Scirocco	(Sweden) Volkswagen Team Biogas
2013	STCC – Racing Elite League	(Sweden) Thed Björk	Volvo S60 TTA	(Sweden) Volvo Polestar Racing
2014	Scandinavian Touring Car Championship	(Sweden) Thed Björk	Volvo S60 TTA	(Sweden) Volvo Polestar Racing
2015	Scandinavian Touring Car Championship	(Sweden) Thed Björk	Volvo S60 TTA	(Sweden) Volvo Cyan Racing
2016	Scandinavian Touring Car Championship	(Sweden) Richard Göransson	Volvo S60 TTA	(Sweden) Polestar Cyan Racing
2017	TCR Scandinavian Touring Car Championship	(Sweden) Robert Dahlgren	CUPRA León TCR	SEAT Dealer Team Sweden
2018	TCR Scandinavian Touring Car Championship	(Sweden) Johan Kristoffersson	Volkswagen Golf GTI TCR	Volkswagen Dealer Team Sweden
2019	TCR Scandinavian Touring Car Championship	(Sweden) Robert Dahlgren	CUPRA León TCR	SEAT Dealer Team Sweden
2020	STCC TCR Scandinavian Touring Car Championship	(United Kingdom) Robert Huff	Volkswagen Golf GTI TCR	(Sweden) Lestrup Racing Team
2021	STCC TCR Scandinavian Touring Car Championship	(Sweden) Robert Dahlgren	Cupra León Competición TCR	(Sweden) Cupra Dealer Team – PWR Racing
2022	STCC TCR Scandinavian Touring Car Championship	(Sweden) Robert Dahlgren	Cupra León Competición TCR	(Sweden) Cupra Dealer Team – PWR Racing
2024	STCC Scandinavian Touring Car Championship	(Sweden) Mikael Karlsson	Tesla Model 3 EPWR	(Sweden) Brink Motorsport

== Event Winners ==
=== Scandinavian Touring Car Cup ===
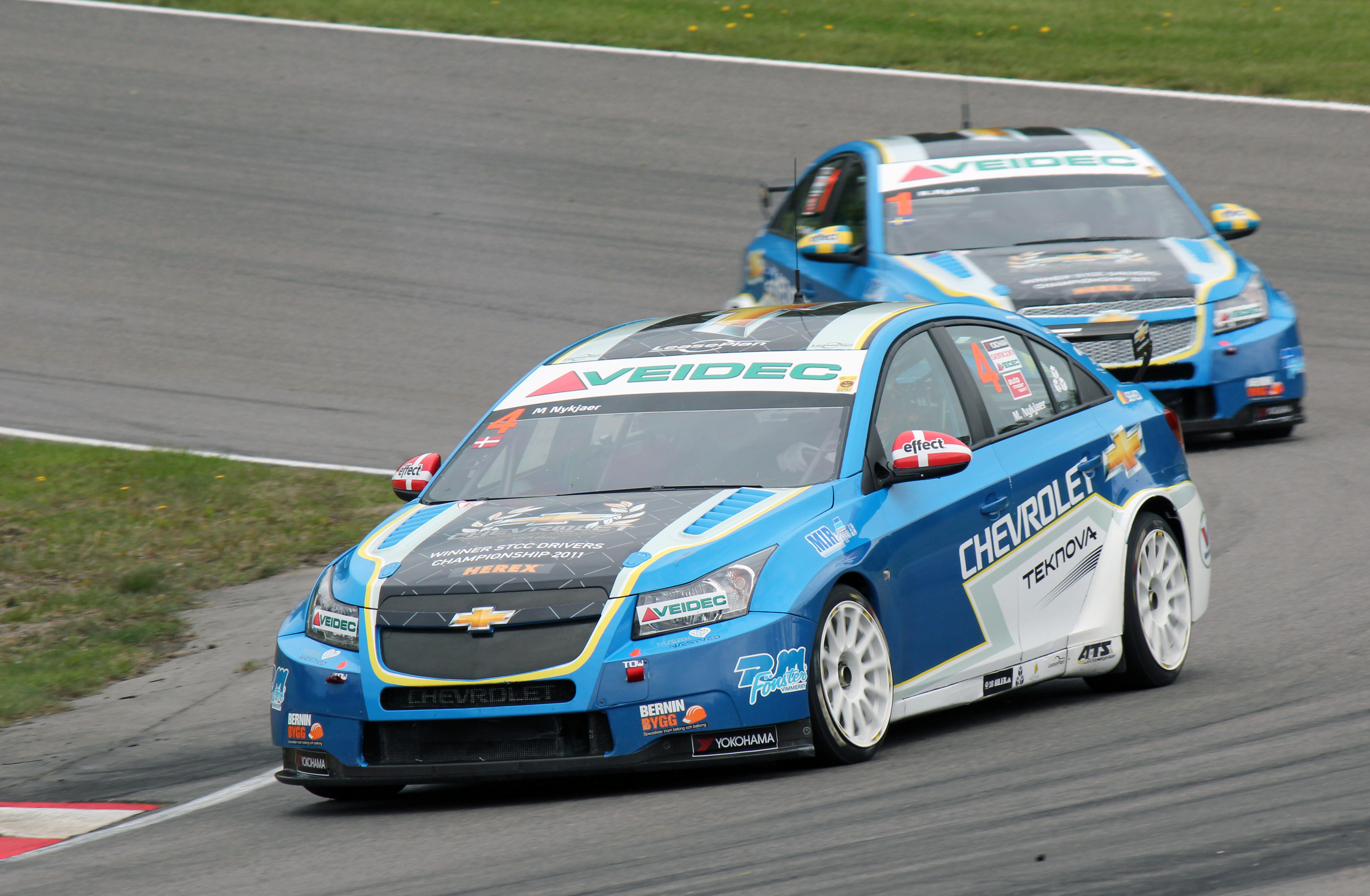
Ring Knutstorp Scandinavian Touring Car Championship 2012.

Drivers
	Driver	Total
1	(Sweden) Thed Björk	2
1	(Sweden) Richard Göransson	2
1	(Sweden) Robert Dahlgren	2
4	(Sweden) Fredrik Ekblom	1
4	(Norway) Tommy Rustad	1

Manufacturers
	Constructor	Total
1	(Germany) BMW	4
2	(Sweden) Volvo	3
3	(Germany) Volkswagen	1

Cars
	Car	Total
1	BMW 320si	4
2	Volvo C30	3
3	Volkswagen Scirocco	1

=== Scandinavian Touring Car Championship ===
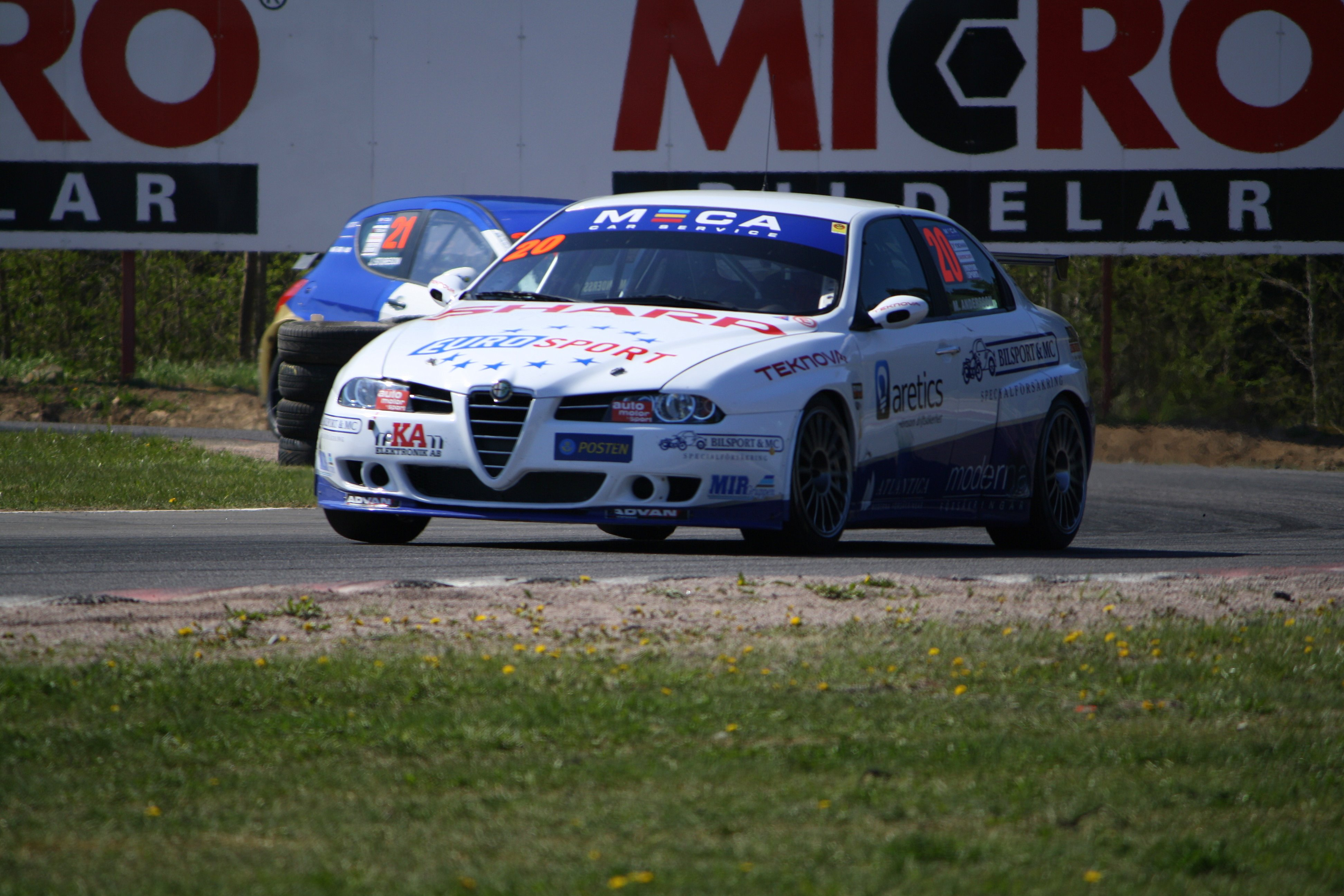
Mattias Andersson's Alfa Romeo 156.

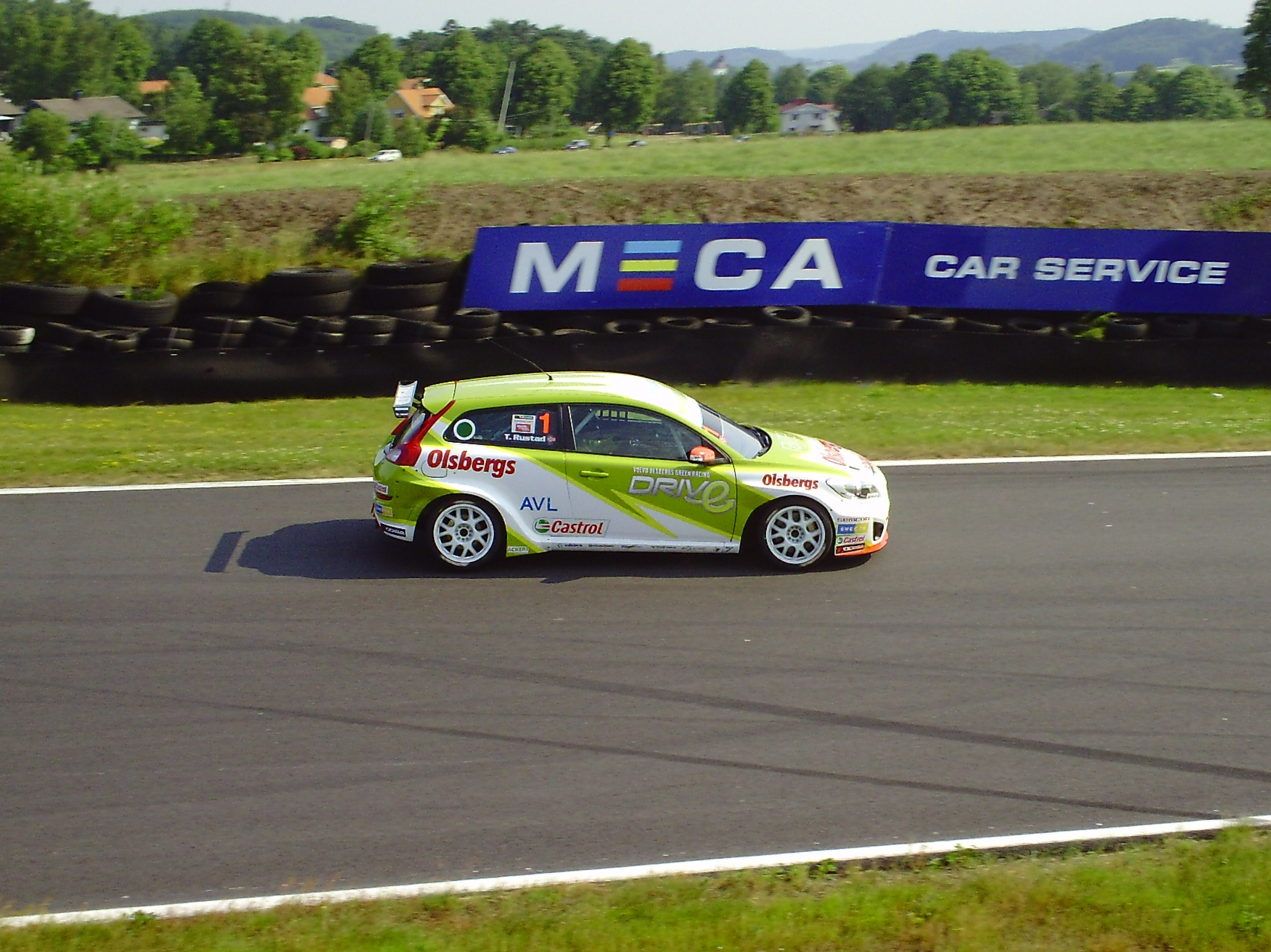
Rustad Polestar Racing 2010.

Drivers
	Driver	Total
1	(Sweden) Fredrik Ekblom	10
2	(Sweden) Thed Björk	8
3	(Sweden) Johan Kristoffersson	6
3	(Sweden) Richard Göransson	6
5	(Sweden) Rickard Rydell	5
5	(Denmark) Michel Nykjær	5
7	(Sweden) Robert Dahlgren	4
7	(Sweden) Fredrik Larsson	4
9	(Sweden) Tomas Engström	3
10	(Sweden) Mattias Andersson	2
10	(Sweden) Daniel Haglöf	2
10	(Sweden) Philip Forsman	2
10	(Norway) Tommy Rustad	2
10	(Sweden) Jan Nilsson	2
14	(Sweden) Linus Ohlsson	1
14	(Sweden) Björn Wirdheim	1
14	(Sweden) Carl Philip Bernadotte	1
14	(Sweden) Andreas Wernersson	1
14	(Sweden) Erik Jonsson	1
14	(Sweden) Mattias Lindberg	1
14	(Sweden) Patrik Olsson	1
14	(Italy) Fabrizio Giovanardi	1
14	(Sweden) Johan Stureson	1
14	(Denmark) Jason Watt	1
14	(Sweden) Mikaela Åhlin-Kottulinsky	1

Manufacturers
	Constructor	Total
1	(Sweden) Volvo	26
2	(Germany) BMW	12
3	(United States) Chevrolet	10
4	(Germany) Volkswagen	9
5	(Japan) Honda	4
6	(Spain) SEAT	3
7	(Sweden) Saab	2
7	(South Korea) KIA	2
9	(Romania) Dacia	1
9	(Japan) Nissan	1
9	(Italy) Alfa Romeo	1

Cars
	Car	Total
1	Volvo S60 TTA	23
2	Chevrolet Cruze	10
3	Volkswagen Scirocco	9
4	BMW SR TTA	7
5	BMW 320si	6
6	SEAT León	3
6	Honda Civic	3
6	Volvo C30	3
9	Saab 9-3 TTA	2
9	KIA Optima TTA	2
11	Nissan SE	1
11	Honda Accord	1
11	Alfa Romeo 156	1

=== STCC – Racing Elite League ===
Drivers
	Driver	Total
1	(Sweden) Thed Björk	8
2	(Sweden) Linus Ohlsson	2
2	(Sweden) Richard Göransson	2

Manufacturers
	Constructor	Total
1	(Sweden) Volvo	10
2	(Germany) BMW	2

Cars
	Car	Total
1	Volvo S60 TTA	10
2	BMW SR TTA	2
