= Fredrik Ekblom =

Swedish race car driver from Kumla

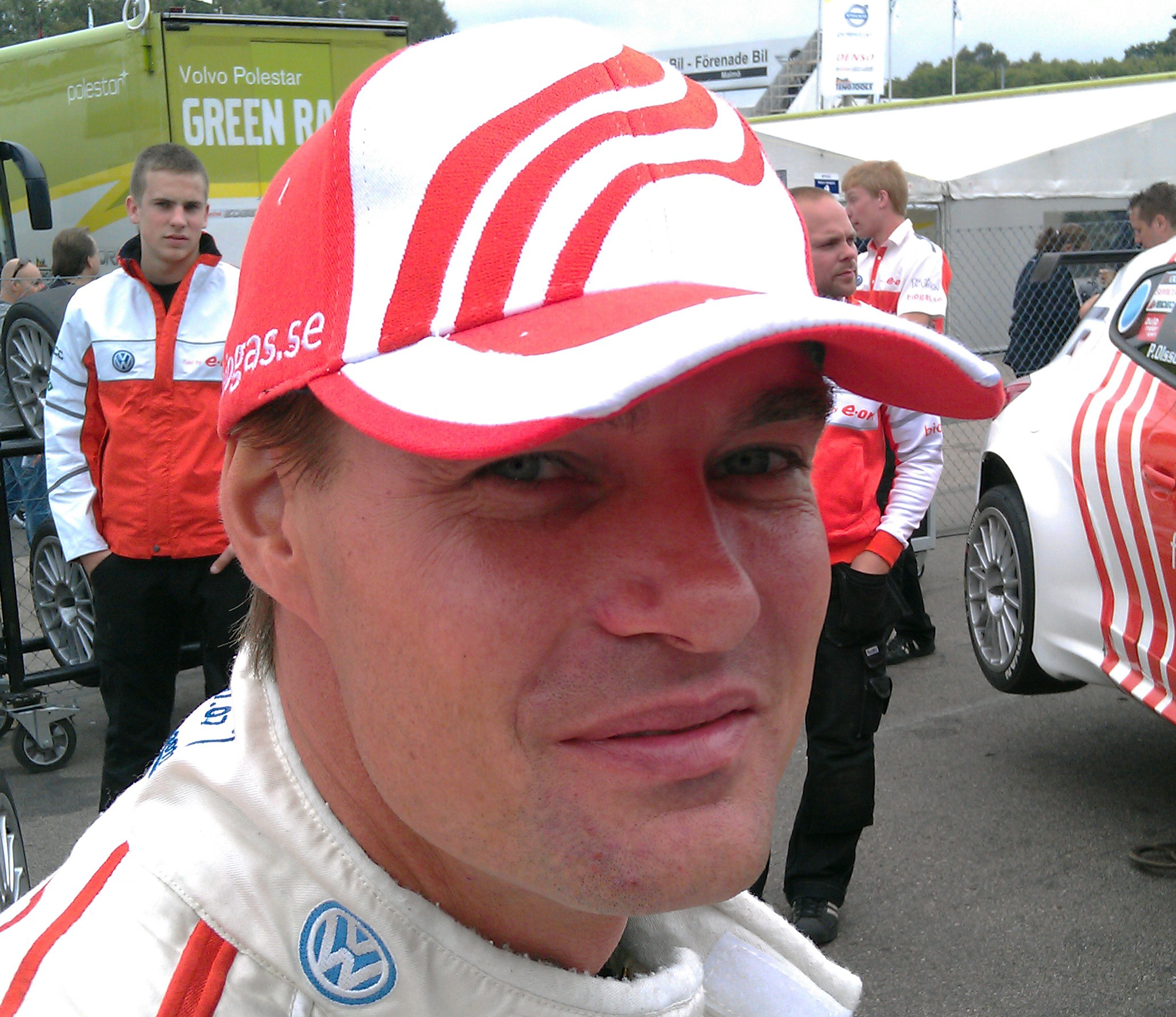
- Ekblom at the second Ring Knutstorp round of the 2011 Scandinavian Touring Car Championship season.
- Nationality: (Sweden) Swedish
- Born: 6 October 1970 (age 56) Kumla, Sweden

STCC – Racing Elite League career
- Debut season: 2011
- Current team: Volvo Polestar Racing
- Car number: 11
- Starts: 20
- Wins: 2
- Poles: 1
- Fastest laps: 5
- Best finish: 1st in 2012

Previous series
- 2007 2002 2001 1998–2000, 2003–10 1995–97 1994–96 1992–93 1991 1990 1990 1989–90: WTCC; ETCC; ALMS; STCC; IMSA GT Championship; CART; Indy Lights; British Formula 3000; German F3 Championship; British F3 Championship; Swedish F3 Championship

Championship titles
- 2012 1998, 2003, 2007: TTA – Racing Elite League; STCC

24 Hours of Le Mans career
- Years: 1997–1999
- Teams: Courage Compétition, Nissan Motorsports
- Best finish: 8th (1999)
- Class wins: 0

Lars Fredrik Wilhelm Ekblom (born 6 October 1970) is a Swedish race car driver from Kumla. After an early career in single-seaters, he switched to touring car racing, where he won multiple titles in his native Swedish Touring Car Championship and later in the TTA – Racing Elite League.

== Career ==
=== CART ===
Ekblom made 13 Indy Lights starts in 1992 and 1993. He then made three starts in CART for three different teams and was entered in the 1994 and 1995 Indianapolis 500 races, but after passing rookie orientation in 1994, he never appeared for practice either year.

=== 24 Hours of Le Mans ===
In 1997 and 1998, Ekblom drove in the 24 Hours of Le Mans for Courage Compétition and in 1999 for Nissan Motorsports.

=== Swedish Touring Car Championship ===
Ekblom began racing in the Swedish Touring Car Championship where he was the series champion in 1998 in a WestCoast Racing prepared BMW 320i. Un the 2000 Swedish Touring Car Championship, he led the points standings heading into the season finale, but a mechanical failure in the last race meant he finished runner-up for the season.

After two seasons away from the championship, Ekblom went on to be champion twice more, winning his second title on his return to the series in 2003 with a Kristoffersson Motorsport–run Audi A4. He continued to drive in the series for Audi until 2006 before returning to WestCoast Racing in 2007 where he became champion for the third time. He stayed with the team for the following season where he finished runner–up to Richard Göransson. For the 2009 season, he moved to the E.ON Biogas Racing Team, driving a Volkswagen Scirocco which ran on bio–gas.

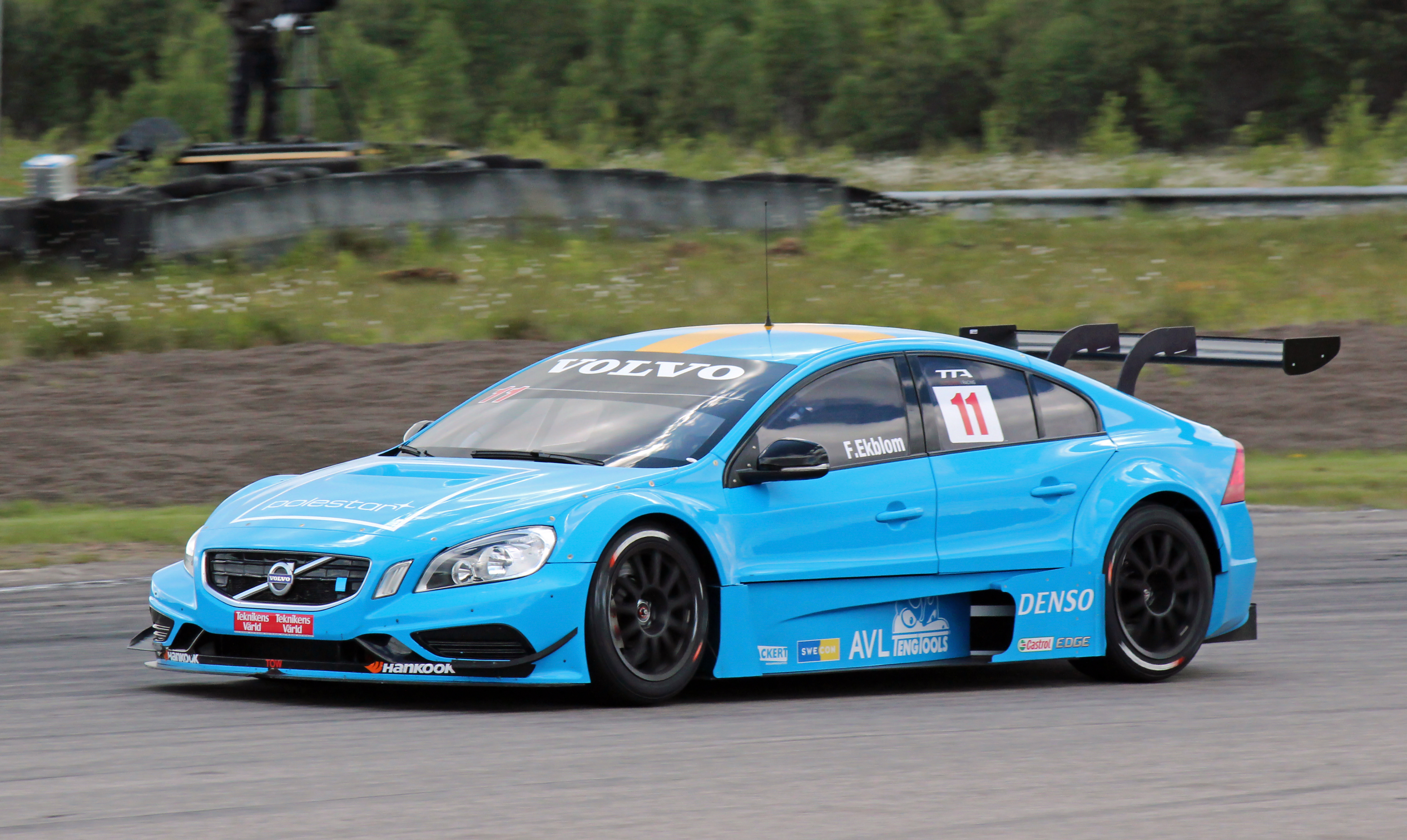
Ekblom driving for Volvo Polestar Racing at the Anderstorp round of the 2012 TTA – Racing Elite League season.

=== European Touring Car Championship ===
During his time away from the Swedish Touring Car Championship, Ekblom competed in the American Le Mans Series and then the European Touring Car Championship in 2002. He drove a BMW 320i for BMW Team Belgium He finished sixth in the championship with a trio of third–place finishes as his best results.

=== World Touring Car Championship ===
Ekblom competed in some rounds of the 2007 World Touring Car Championship season for BMW Team UK to help Andy Priaulx with his title campaign. He made his first appearance at the Race of Sweden before returning for the final two rounds of the season, he scored a single point at the final race in Macau.

Ekblom drove a Volvo S60 in seven rounds of the 2016 World Touring Car Championship for Polestar Cyan Racing, with a best result of fourth at Hungary race 1.

=== TTA / STCC ===
Ekblom signed a three-year deal with Volvo Polestar Racing to compete in the TTA – Racing Elite League starting in 2012. Ekblom secured third on grid at the final round in Gothenburg to claim the drivers' championship title. He finished fifth in the 2013 STCC – Racing Elite League. Despite missing two races, he came third in the 2014. He was runner-up in 2015, also with a Polestar Volvo S60.

After skipping the 2016 season, Ekblom joined Kristoffersson Motorsport to compete at the 2017 TCR Scandinavia Touring Car Championship with a dealer-supported Volkswagen Golf GTI.

== Racing record ==
=== American Open Wheel ===
(key)

==== CART ====
Year	Team	1	2	3	4	5	6	7	8	9	10	11	12	13	14	15	16	17	Rank	Points	Ref
1994	McCormack	SRF	PHX	LBH	INDY	MIL	DET; 15	POR	CLE	TOR	MIS	MDO	NHM	VAN	ROA	NZR	LS		**39th**	**0**	
1995	Foyt	MIA	SRF	PHX	LBH	NZR	INDY	MIL	DET	POR	ROA	TOR	CLE	MIS	MDO	NHM	VAN	LS; 19	**42nd**	**0**	
1996	Walker	MIA	RIO	SRF	LBH	NZR	500; 25	MIL	DET	POR	CLE	TOR	MIS	MDO	ROA	VAN	LS		**40th**	**0**	

=== 24 Hours of Le Mans results ===
Year	Team	Co-Drivers	Car	Class	Laps	Pos.	Class Pos.
1997	(France) Courage Compétition	(France) Jean-Louis Ricci (Belgium) Jean-Paul Libert	Courage C36	LMP	265	16th	5th
1998	(France) Courage Compétition	(France) Patrice Gay (Japan) Takeshi Tsuchiya	Courage C51	LMP1	126	DNF	DNF
1999	(Japan) Nissan Motorsports	(France) Didier Cottaz (Belgium) Marc Goossens	Courage C52	LMP	335	8th	7th

=== Complete Swedish Touring Car Championship results ===
(key) (Races in bold indicate pole position) (Races in italics indicate fastest lap)

Year	Team	Car	1	2	3	4	5	6	7	8	9	10	11	12	13	14	15	16	17	18	DC	Points
1998	BMW Dealer Team	BMW 320i	MAN; 1; 4	MAN; 2; 1	KAR; 1; 2	KAR; 2; 2	AND; 1; 3	AND; 2; 4	FAL; 1 Ret	FAL; 2; 2	**KNU**; **1**; 1	KNU; 2; 3	MAN; 1; 1	MAN; 2; 2							1st	229
1999	BMW Dealer Team	BMW 320i	MAN; 1; 1	MAN; 2; 4	KNU; 1; 2	KNU; 2; 7	KAR; 1; 3	KAR; 2; 2	AND; 1; 21	AND; 2; 2	FAL; 1; 1	FAL; 2; 5	AND; 1 Ret	AND; 2; 3	ARC; 1; 5	ARC; 2; 6	MAN; 1; 3	MAN; 2; 1			2nd	209
2000	Kristoffersson Motorsport	Audi A4 Quattro	KAR; 1; 1	KAR; 2; 1	**KNU**; **1**; 1	**KNU**; **2**; 1	MAN; 1; 2	MAN; 2; 1	FAL; 1; 6	FAL; 2; 3	AND; 1; 7	AND; 2; 3	ARC; 1; 5	ARC; 2; 4	**KAR**; **1**; 1	**KAR**; **2**; 1	MAN; 1; 8	MAN; 2 Ret			2nd	167
2003	Kristoffersson Motorsport	Audi A4 B6/7	FAL; 1; 1	FAL; 2; 3	MAN; 1; 2	MAN; 2; 1	KAR; 1; 3	KAR; 2; 4	FAL; 1; 2	FAL; 2; 10	KNU; 1; 2	KNU; 2; 2	KAR; 1; 3	KAR; 2; 8	KNU; 1; 3	KNU; 2; 11	MAN; 1; 2	MAN; 2; 7			1st	224
2004	Kristoffersson Motorsport	Audi A4	KNU; 1; 4	KNU; 2; 6	FAL; 1; 5	FAL; 2; 1	KAR; 1; 6	KAR; 2; 3	MAN; 1; 4	MAN; 2; 5	FAL; 1; 4	FAL; 2; 2	KNU; 1; 7	KNU; 2; 6	ARC; 1; 2	ARC; 2; 4	KAR; 1; 6	KAR; 2; 8	MAN; 1; 1	MAN; 2; 3	3rd	165
2005	Kristoffersson Motorsport	Audi A4	KNU; 5	KAR; 5	AND; 10	FAL; 5	KNU; 4	KAR; 3	VAL; Ret	MAN; 17											6th	73
2006	Kristoffersson Motorsport	Audi A4	KNU; 2	KAR; 10	MAN; 4	FAL; Ret	VAL; 3	AND; 8	KAR; 10	KNU; 3	MAN; 5										4th	30
2007	West Coast Racing	BMW 320si E90	STU; 12	KNU; 3	MAN; 2	KAR; 1	AND; 4	VAL; 5	FAL; 2	KAR; 2	KNU; 6	STU; 1	MAN; Ret								1st	62
2008	West Coast Racing	BMW 320si E90	KNU; 2	STU; 1	MAN; 3	KAR; Ret	GÖT; 3	STU; 5	FAL; 1	KAR; 2	KNU; 9	VAL; 12	MAN; 2								2nd	60
2009	Biogas.se	Volkswagen Scirocco	MAN; 1; 11	MAN; 2; 9	KAR; 1; 10	KAR; 2; 9	GÖT; 1; 8	**GÖT**; **2**; 10	KNU; 1 Ret	KNU; 2; 10	FAL; 1; 9	FAL; 2; 17	KAR; 1 Ret	KAR; 2 Ret	VAL; 1 DNS	VAL; 2; 6	KNU; 1; 14	KNU; 2; 5	MAN; 1; 10	MAN; 2; 8	13th	9
2010	Team Biogas.se	Volkswagen Scirocco	JYL; 1; 5	**JYL**; **2**; 9	KNU; 1; 4	KNU; 2; 5	**KAR**; **1**; 1	KAR; 2; 6	GÖT; 1; 3	GÖT; 2; 3	FAL; 1; 4	FAL; 2; 4	**KAR**; **1**; 1	KAR; 2; 5	JYL; 1; 5	JYL; 2; 5	**KNU**; **1**; 1	KNU; 2; 5	MAN; 1; 3	MAN; 2; 8	3rd	230

=== Complete European Touring Car Championship results ===
(key) (Races in bold indicate pole position) (Races in italics indicate fastest lap)

Year	Team	Car	1	2	3	4	5	6	7	8	9	10	11	12	13	14	15	16	17	18	19	20	DC	Pts
2002	BMW Team Belgium	BMW 320i	MAG; 1; 6	**MAG**; **2**; 6	SIL; 1; 10	SIL; 2; 6	BRN; 1; 7	BRN; 2 Ret	JAR; 1; 8	JAR; 2; 5	AND; 1; 11	AND; 2; 3	OSC; 1 Ret	OSC; 2; 9	SPA; 1; 3	SPA; 2 Ret	PER; 1; 5	PER; 2; 5	DON; 1	DON; 2	EST; 1 Ret	EST; 2; 3	6th	21

=== Complete World Touring Car Championship results ===
(key) (Races in bold indicate pole position) (Races in italics indicate fastest lap)

Year	Team	Car	1	2	3	4	5	6	7	8	9	10	11	12	13	14	15	16	17	18	19	20	21	22	DC	Points
2007	BMW Team UK	BMW 320si	BRA; 1	BRA; 2	NED; 1	NED; 2	ESP; 1	ESP; 2	FRA; 1	FRA; 2	CZE; 1	CZE; 2	POR; 1	POR; 2	SWE; 1; 12	SWE; 2; 14	GER; 1	GER; 2	GBR; 1	GBR; 2	ITA; 1; 11	ITA; 2; 12	MAC; 1; 16	MAC; 2; 9	20th	1
2016	Polestar Cyan Racing	Volvo S60 Polestar TC1	FRA; 1 NC	FRA; 2; 10	SVK; 1; 10	SVK; 2; 8	HUN; 1; 4	HUN; 2; 11	MAR; 1; 7	MAR; 2; 11	GER; 1; 8	GER; 2; 7	RUS; 1; 13	RUS; 2; 12	POR; 1	POR; 2	ARG; 1	ARG; 2	JPN; 1	JPN; 2	CHN; 1; 8	CHN; 2; 6	QAT; 1	QAT; 2	13th	47

=== Complete Scandinavian Touring Car Championship results ===
(key) (Races in bold indicate pole position) (Races in italics indicate fastest lap)

Year	Team	Car	1	2	3	4	5	6	7	8	9	10	11	12	13	14	15	16	17	18	19	20	21	DC	Points
2011	Biogas.se	Volkswagen Scirocco	JYL; 1; 11	JYL; 2; 10	**KNU**; **1**; 1	KNU; 2; 6	**MAN**; **1**; 1	MAN; 2; 6	GÖT; 1; 2	GÖT; 2; 3	**FAL**; **1**; 1	FAL; 2; 8	KAR; 1; 3	KAR; 2; 5	JYL; 1; 3	JYL; 2; 10	KNU; 1; 2	KNU; 2; 7	MAN; 1; 2	MAN; 2; 3				2nd	227
2013	Volvo Polestar Racing	Volvo S60 TTA	KNU; 1; 6	KNU; 2; 6	SOL; 1; 3	GÖT; 1; 9	FAL; 1; 2	FAL; 2; 3	ÖST; 1; 4	KAR; 1; 4	KAR; 2; 2	TIE; 1; 6	MAN; 1; 2	MAN; 2 Ret										5th	140
2014	Volvo Polestar Racing	Volvo S60 TTA	KNU; 1; 6	**KNU**; **2**; 1	GÖT; 1; 7	GÖT; 2 DNS	FAL; 1 Ret	**FAL**; **2**; 1	KNU; 1 Ret	**KNU**; **2** DNS	SOL; 1; 12	SOL; 2; 4	MAN; 1; 6	MAN; 2; 1										3rd	210
2015	Volvo Polestar Racing	Volvo S60 TTA	VRS; 1; 2	VRS; 2 Ret	AND; 1; 3	AND; 2; 2	MAN; 1; 3	MAN; 2; 1	FAL; 1; 2	FAL; 2 Ret	KAR; 1; 2	KAR; 2; 1												2nd	356
2015	Volvo Cyan Racing	Volvo S60 TTA											SOL; 1; 7	SOL; 2; 5	**KNU**; **1**; 1	KNU; 2; 1								2nd	356
2017	Volkswagen Dealer Team Sweden	Volkswagen Golf GTI TCR	**KNU**; **1**; 2	KNU; 2; 2	**KNU**; **3**; 1	ALA; 1; 3	ALA; 2; 2	ALA; 3; 3	SOL; 1; 11	SOL; 2; 3	SOL; 3; 3	**FAL**; **1**; 3	**FAL**; **2**; 1	FAL; 3; 16	KAR; 1; 2	KAR; 2; 1	KAR; 3; 3	AND; 1; 2	AND; 2; 12	AND; 3; 4	**MAN**; **1**; 1	**MAN**; **2**; 1	MAN; 3; 8	2nd	327
2018	WestCoast Racing	Volkswagen Golf GTI TCR	KNU; 1; 5	KNU; 2; 4	AND; 1; 7	AND; 2; 3	FAL; 1; 5	FAL; 2; 2	KAR; 1; 4	KAR; 2; 15	RUD; 1; 7	RUD; 2; 8	MAN; 1; 4	MAN; 2; 6										6th	111

=== Complete TTA–Racing Elite League results ===
(key) (Races in bold indicate pole position) (Races in italics indicate fastest lap)

Year	Team	Car	1	2	3	4	5	6	7	8	DC	Points
2012	Volvo Polestar Racing	Volvo S60 TTA	KAR; 2	AND; 1	GÖT; 5	FAL; 4	**KAR**; 1	AND; 2	TIE; 2	GÖT; 4	**1st**	**151**

Sporting positions
Preceded by Jan Nilsson	Swedish Touring Car Champion; 1998	Succeeded by Mattias Ekström
Preceded by Roberto Colciago	Swedish Touring Car Champion; 2003	Succeeded by Richard Göransson
Preceded by Thed Björk	Swedish Touring Car Champion; 2007	Succeeded by Richard Göransson
