= Johan Stureson =

Swedish auto racing driver (born 1973)

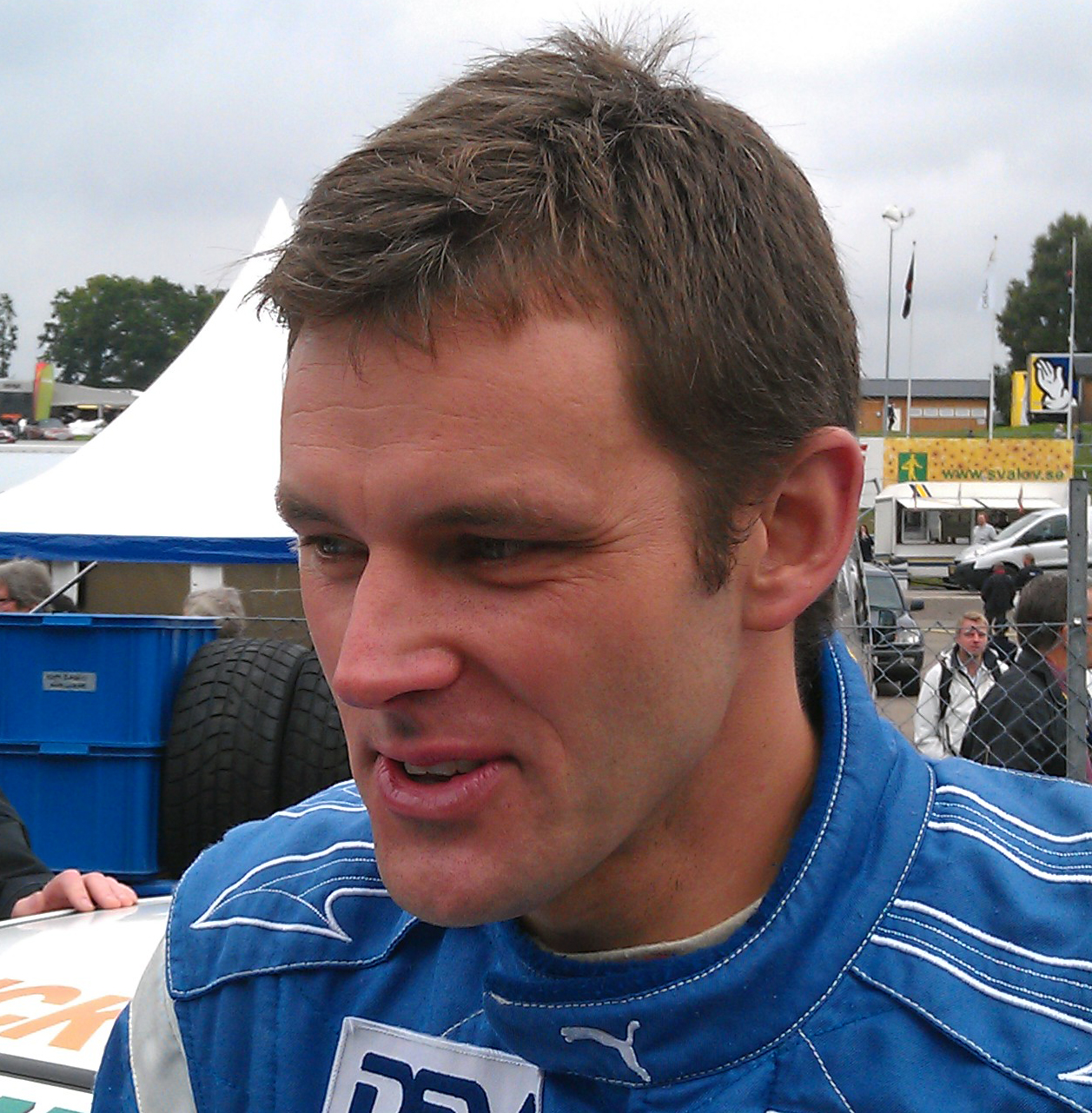
- Johan Stureson in 2011.
- Nationality: (Sweden) Swedish
- Born: August 3, 1973 (age 53) Kristianstad, Sweden
- Relatives: Per Stureson (father)

Scandinavian Touring Car Championship career
- Debut season: 2011
- Current team: IPS Team Biogas
- Car number: 21

Previous series
- 2003–2010 N/A–2002: Swedish Touring Car Championship; Swedish GT

Championship titles
- 2002: Swedish GT

Per Johan Fredrik Stureson (born 3 August 1973 in Kristianstad) is a Swedish auto racing driver who formerly raced in the Scandinavian Touring Car Championship for IPS Motorsport. He is son of the former driver and 1985 DTM champion Per Stureson.

== Racing career ==
Stureson began his career in Formula BMW Junior in 1992. He is Swedish GT champion for 2002 and he moved to the Swedish Touring Car Championship in 2003. He raced in 2005 with Peugeot 407 and with Peugeot 308 in 2008. For 2010 season, he switched to BMW 320si, after racing with Peugeot since 2004. For the 2012 Scandinavian Touring Car Championship season, he would race Volkswagen Scirocco again for his family-run team IPS.

== Racing record ==
=== Complete German Formula 3 results ===
(key) (Races in bold indicate pole position) (Races in italics indicate fastest lap)

Year	Entrant	1	2	3	4	5	6	7	8	9	10	11	12	13	14	15	16	17	18	19	20	DC	Points
1995	IPS Motorsport	HOC; 18	HOC; Ret	AVU; 14	AVU; 19	NOR	NOR	DIE; 10	DIE; 14	NÜR; 14	NÜR; 20	SIN; 15	SIN; 13	MAG; 12	MAG; 15	HOC; 12	HOC; Ret					27th	1
1996	IPS Motorsport	HOC; Ret	HOC; 17	NÜR; 11	NÜR; 21	NÜR; 10	NOR; 13	NOR; DNS	DIE; 15	DIE; 18	NÜR; 6	NÜR; 9	MAG; 8	MAG; Ret	HOC; 9	HOC; 9						16th	16
1997	IPS Motorsport	HOC; 10	HOC; Ret	NÜR; Ret	NÜR; DNS	SAC; 8	SAC; 16	NOR; 7	NOR; 9	WUN; 6	WUN; 11	ZWE; 15	ZWE; Ret	SAL; 8	SAL; 8	LAH; 13	LAH; Ret	NÜR; 7	NÜR; Ret			14th	26
1998	IPS Motorsport	HOC; 12	HOC; 8	NÜR; 11	NÜR; 11	SAC; 6	SAC; 4	NOR; 11	NOR; 8	LAH; Ret	LAH; 15	WUN; 17	WUN; 8	ZWE; 7	ZWE; 8	SAL; 6	SAL; 15	LAH; 6	LAH; 5	NÜR; Ret	NÜR; 15	13th	52

=== Complete Swedish GTR Championship results ===
(key) (Races in bold indicate pole position) (Races in italics indicate fastest lap)

Year	Entrant	Car	Class	1	2	3	4	5	6	7	8	DC	Points
2001	IPS Motorsport	Porsche 996 GT3	GT3	FAL; 2	MAN; 9	GEL; Ret	JYL; 3	FAL; Ret	MIR; 3	MAN; 4 (2)	MAN; 2	4th	131
2002	Podium Racing	Porsche 996 GT3 RS	GTB	MAN; 1	GEL; 2 (1)	FAL; 2 (1)	KNU; 2 (1)	GEL; 2 (1)	MAN; 2 (1)	MAN; 2 (1)		**1st**	**171**

=== Complete European Touring Car Championship results ===
(key) (Races in bold indicate pole position) (Races in italics indicate fastest lap)

Season	Team	Car	VAL (Spain)	MAG (France)	PER (Italy)	BRN (Czech Republic)	DON (United Kingdom)	SPA (Belgium)	AND (Sweden)		OSC (Germany)	EST (Portugal)	MON (Italy)	Pos	Pts
2003	Podium Racing	Seat Toledo Cupra							16	16†				27th	0
