= Richard Göransson =

Swedish racing driver (born 1978)

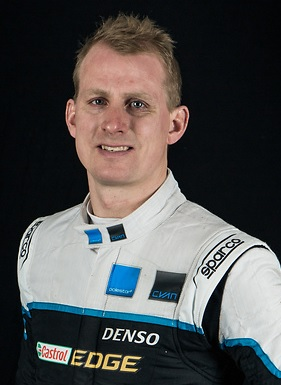
Richard Göransson in April 2016

Karl Richard Jonsson Göransson (born 8 August 1978 in Örebro) is a Swedish racing driver. He is a four-time champion of the Swedish Touring Car Championship winning it for West Coast Racing in 2004, 2005, 2008 and 2010. He won the Scandinavian Touring Car Championship in 2016 for Polestar Cyan Racing.

== Career ==
Göransson started racing in karting from 1989 through to 1993. In 1996, he was Swedish Formula Ford Champion. He also competed in both the British and European Formula Ford Championships. He won the European Formula Ford Championship in 2001. In 2002, he raced in some rounds of the British Formula Renault, before moving to the STCC in 2003 where he finished fifth in his first season.

Göransson's time in the STCC has been very successful. After winning back-to-back titles for West Coast Racing in 2004 and 2005, he switched to Flash Engineering in 2006 and drove alongside team owner Jan "Flash" Nilsson for three years. In 2008, he was champion for the third time. In 2009, he returned to WCR and regained the drivers title in 2010.

Göransson was winner of the European Touring Car Cup held at Vallelunga in 2005.

== Racing record ==
=== WRC results ===
| Year | Entrant | Car | 1 | 2 | 3 | 4 | 5 | 6 | 7 | 8 | 9 | 10 | 11 | 12 | 13 | WDC | Points |
|---|---|---|---|---|---|---|---|---|---|---|---|---|---|---|---|---|---|
| 2011 | Richard Göransson | Mitsubishi Lancer Evo X | SWE; 17 | MEX | POR | JOR | ITA | ARG | GRE | FIN | GER | AUS | FRA | ESP | GBR | NC | 0 |
| 2012 | Richard Göransson | Mini John Cooper Works WRC | MON | SWE; 38 | MEX | POR | ARG | GRE | NZL | FIN | GER | GBR | FRA | ITA | ESP | NC | 0 |

=== Complete FIA European Rallycross Championship results ===
==== Supercar ====
| Year | Entrant | Car | 1 | 2 | 3 | 4 | 5 | ERX | Points |
|---|---|---|---|---|---|---|---|---|---|
| 2014 | Olsbergs MSE | Ford Fiesta ST | GBR | NOR | BEL | GER | ITA; 4 | 19th | 13 |

=== Complete FIA World Rallycross Championship results ===
==== Supercar ====
| Year | Entrant | Car | 1 | 2 | 3 | 4 | 5 | 6 | 7 | 8 | 9 | 10 | 11 | 12 | WRX | Points |
|---|---|---|---|---|---|---|---|---|---|---|---|---|---|---|---|---|
| 2014 | Olsbergs MSE | Ford Fiesta ST | POR | GBR | NOR | FIN | SWE | BEL | CAN | FRA | GER | ITA; 2 | TUR; 9 | ARG | 19th | 26 |
| 2016 | Olsbergs MSE | Ford Fiesta ST | POR | HOC | BEL | GBR | NOR | SWE; 17 | CAN | FRA | BAR | LAT | GER | ARG | 26th | 0 |

==== RX Lites Cup ====
| Year | Entrant | Car | 1 | 2 | 3 | 4 | 5 | 6 | Lites | Points |
|---|---|---|---|---|---|---|---|---|---|---|
| 2014 | Olsbergs MSE | Lites Ford Fiesta | POR; 3 | GBR; 2 | FIN | SWE; 3 | ITA | TUR | 6th | 73 |

Sporting positions
| Preceded by Fredrik Ekblom | Swedish Touring Car Champion; 2004-2005 | Succeeded by Thed Bjork |
| Preceded by None | European Touring Car Cup Champion; 2005 | Succeeded by Ryan Sharp |
| Preceded by Fredrik Ekblom | Swedish Touring Car Champion; 2008 | Succeeded by Tommy Rustad |
| Preceded by Tommy Rustad | Swedish Touring Car Champion; 2010 | Succeeded by Rickard Rydell |
