= Tommy Rustad =

Norwegian racing driver (born 1968)

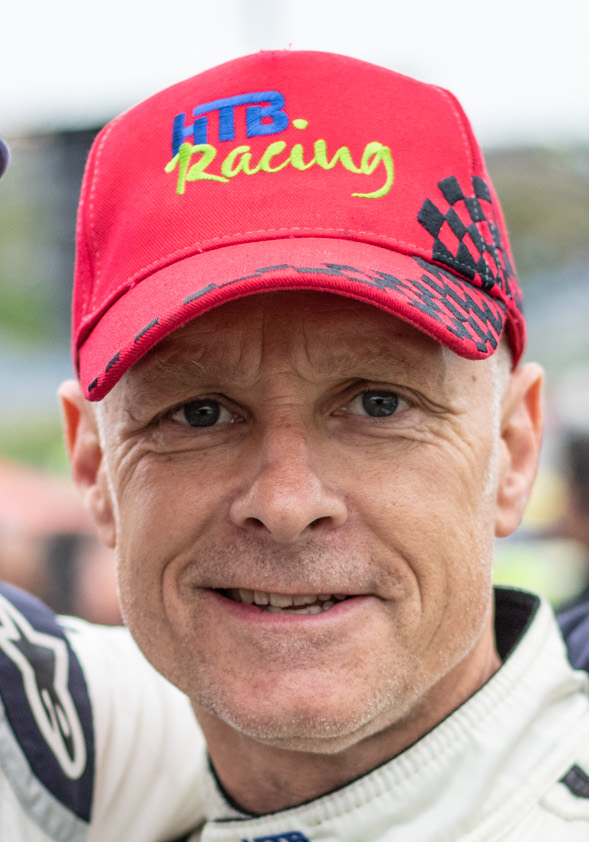
- Rustad at the 2018 World RX of Norway
- Nationality: (Norway) Norwegian
- Born: 3 September 1968 (age 58) Oslo, Norway

FIA ERX Supercar Championship career
- Debut season: 2011
- Current team: Albatec-HTB Racing
- Car number: 24
- Former teams: HTB Racing-Marklund Motorsport; HTB Racing
- Starts: 22
- Championships: 1 (2015)
- Wins: 4
- Podiums: 6

FIA World Rallycross Championship
- Years active: 2014–2018
- Former teams: Münnich Motorsport; HTB Racing-Marklund Motorsport; HTB Racing
- Starts: 13
- Wins: 0
- Podiums: 0
- Best finish: 17th in 2018

Tommy Rustad (born 3 September 1968) is a Norwegian racing driver. He currently drives in the FIA European Rallycross Championship and occasionally in the FIA World Rallycross Championship. He is the son of former well known Norwegian racer Ola Rustad.

== Racing career ==
=== Early Rallycross Years ===
Rustad started his motor sport career in karting before racing in the Norwegian Rallycross Championship, winning the so-called Supernasjonal title for six years in a row between 1987 and 1992. On 14 June 1992, he claimed overall victory in the Irish round of the European Rallycross Championship at Mondello Park, racing one of the two 650bhp strong Ford RS200 Group B cars of his compatriot and mentor Martin Schanche.

=== Single Seaters ===
In 1993, Rustad switched to circuit racing, becoming the Swedish Formula Opel Champion in his first year. He drove in the Formula Opel Euroseries in 1994, finishing fifth in points, and finished sixth in the 1995 Eurocup Formula Renault. In 1996, he was in the Italian Formula Three Championship finishing ninth, and the Renault Spider Eurocup, finishing second in his first year, and was champion in 1997.

=== BTCC ===
In 1998, Rustad got a drive in the British Touring Car Championship. He drove a Renault Laguna for the DC Cook Motorsport team in the Michelin Independents Cup, despite getting some backing from the Renault works team. With five class wins throughout the seasons, he was crowned independent champion. A 16th place overall finish saw him one place ahead of works Peugeot driver Tim Harvey.

=== STCC ===
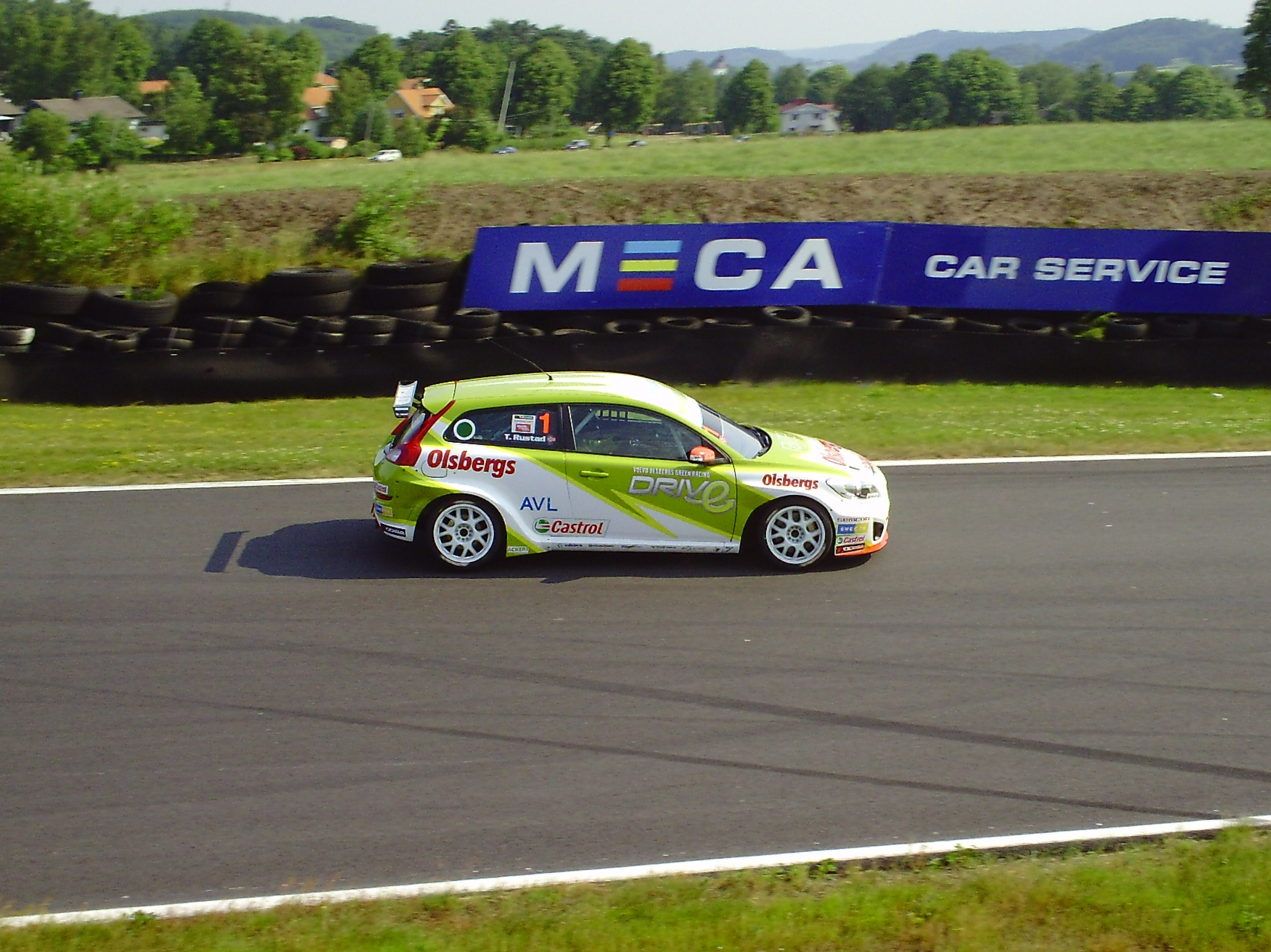
Rustad driving a Volvo C30 at Falkenbergs Motorbana.

Since his drive in the BTCC, Rustad has spent most of his career driving in the Swedish Touring Car Championship. He was champion in both the STCC and the Norwegian Touring Car Championship in 2000, driving a works Nissan Primera. After this, he spent a couple of seasons racing in the European Touring Car Championship, before returning to Sweden in 2003 in an Opel Astra. After another rallycross year, he returned to the STCC Opel Team in 2007. 2008 had him drive a works Volvo C30 powered by bio-ethanol for Polestar Racing. He went on to win the championship for the second time in 2009 for Polestar.

=== WTCC ===
Rustad became the first Norwegian to drive in the World Touring Car Championship when his Polestar Racing team entered rounds 15 and 16 of the 2009 season at Brands Hatch. Rustad retired from both races.

=== Rallycross ===
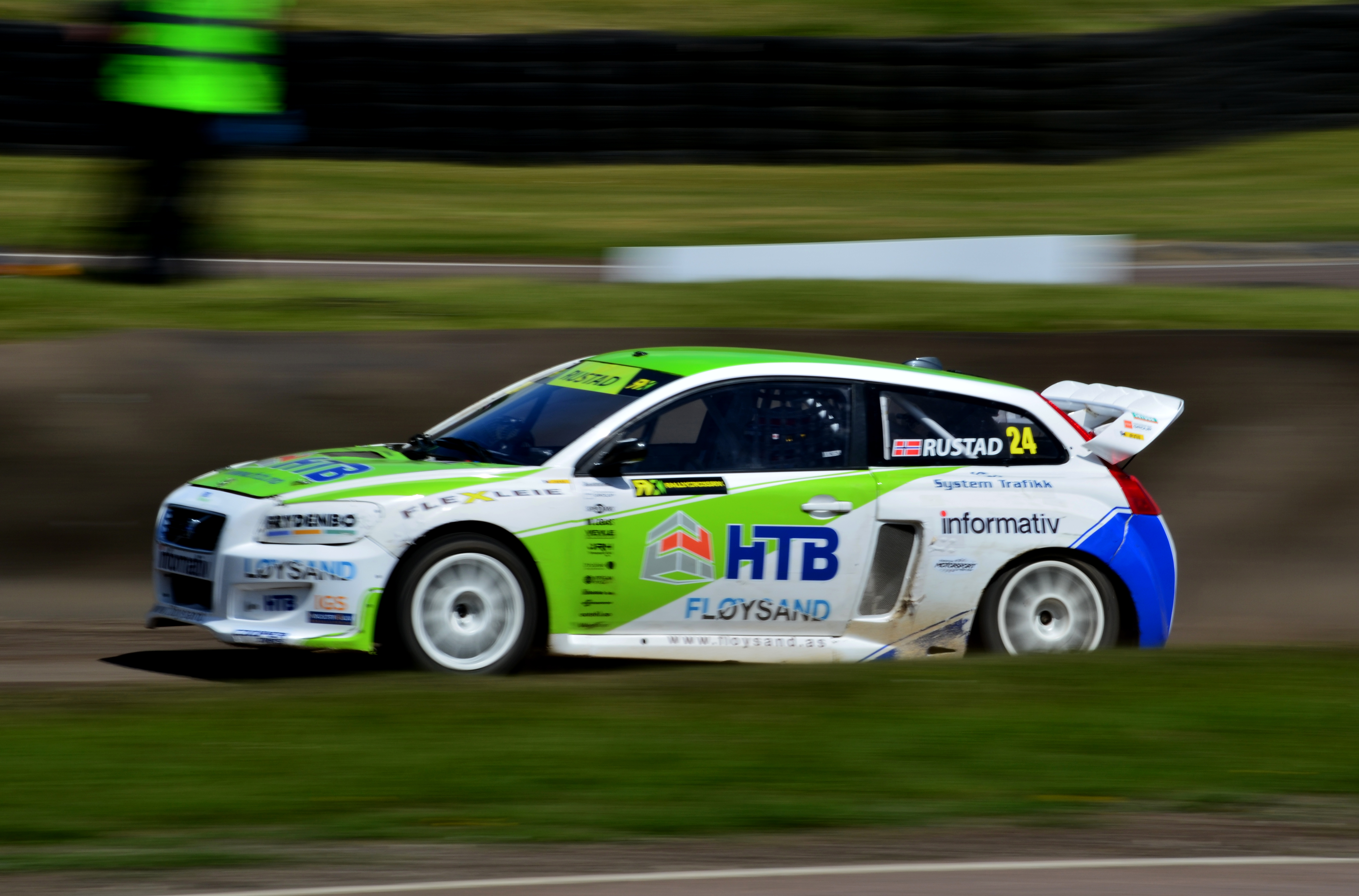
Rustad competing in the 2014 World RX of Great Britain

In 2006, Rustad went back to rallycross for one year, forming a team with his compatriot Sverre Isachsen for to compete in the FIA European Championships for Rallycross Drivers where he eventually finished third overall with a Ford Focus T16 4x4.

After his retirement from tarmac racing, Rustad took the decision to return full-time to rallycross in 2013, driving a Volvo S40 Mk1 in all the rounds of the Norwegian Rallycross Championship for SuperNational cars with an engine capacity of over 2000cc. He was also seen in the two Scandinavian rounds (Norway and Sweden) of the 2013 European Rallycross Championship, driving a rented Volvo C30 SuperCar. In 2014, he participated in six of the twelve rounds of the inaugural FIA World Rallycross Championship, again racing a Volvo C30 SuperCar, but with little success. However, while finishing 27th of the final WorldRX standings only his sixth place overall in the EuroRX series was a much better result. For 2015, he was entrusted by his sponsor with a competitive VW Polo Mk5 SuperCar of the Volkswagen Team Marklund Motorsport, which he used successfully to claim his first European Rallycross title. Of the five rounds counting towards the EuroRX series Rustad won three, beating his strongest competitor Jérôme Grosset-Janin from France to second place.

== Racing record ==
=== Complete British Touring Car Championship results ===
(key) (Races in bold indicate pole position – 1 point awarded all races) (Races in italics indicate fastest lap) (* signifies that driver lead feature race for at least one lap – 1 point awarded)

Year	Team	Car	1	2	3	4	5	6	7	8	9	10	11	12	13	14	15	16	17	18	19	20	21	22	23	24	25	26	Pos	Pts
1998	DC Cook Motorsport	Renault Laguna	THR; 1; 16	THR; 2 Ret	SIL; 1; 15	SIL; 2; 13	DON; 1; 17	DON; 2; 12	BRH; 1; 12	BRH; 2; 14*	OUL; 1; 13	OUL; 2; 12	DON; 1; 12	DON; 2; 8	CRO; 1; 15	CRO; 2 Ret	SNE; 1; 17	SNE; 2; 12	THR; 1; 14	THR; 2 Ret	KNO; 1; 13	KNO; 2; 8	BRH; 1; 15	BRH; 2; 13	OUL; 1; 12	OUL; 2; 8			16th	12
1998	Blend 37 Williams Renault	Renault Laguna																									SIL; 1; 11	SIL; 2; 9	16th	12

=== Complete Swedish Touring Car Championship results ===
(key) (Races in bold indicate pole position) (Races in italics indicate fastest lap)

Year	Team	Car	1	2	3	4	5	6	7	8	9	10	11	12	13	14	15	16	17	18	DC	Points
1999	Elgh Motorsport	Nissan Primera GT	**MAN**; **1**; 2	MAN; 2 Ret	KNU; 1; 6	KNU; 2; 9	**KAR**; **1**; 1	KAR; 2 Ret	**AND**; **1**; 1	**AND**; **2**; 1	FAL; 1; 5	FAL; 2; 2	**AND**; **1**; 1	**AND**; **2**; 1	**ARC**; **1**; 1	**ARC**; **2**; 1	MAN; 1; 18	MAN; 2 Ret			3rd	186
2000	Crawford Nissan Racing	Nissan Primera Mk3 GT	**KAR**; **1**; 7	**KAR**; **2**; 2	KNU; 1; 5	KNU; 2; 2	MAN; 1; 1	MAN; 2; 4	FAL; 1; 3	**FAL**; **2**; 1	AND; 1; 3	AND; 2; 2	ARC; 1; 2	ARC; 2; 2	KAR; 1; 2	KAR; 2; 3	**MAN**; **1**; 20	**MAN**; **2**; 3			1st	175
2003	Opel Team Sweden	Opel Astra	FAL; 1 Ret	FAL; 2; 6	MAN; 1; 4	MAN; 2; 5	KAR; 1; 6	KAR; 2; 2	FAL; 1; 3	FAL; 2; 5	KNU; 1; 6	KNU; 2; 4	KAR; 1; 11	KAR; 2; 7	KNU; 1; 1	KNU; 2; 2	MAN; 1 Ret	MAN; 2 DNS			4th	161
2004	Opel Team Sweden	Opel Astra	KNU; 1 Ret	KNU; 2; 4	FAL; 1; 4	FAL; 2; 7	KAR; 1; 5	KAR; 2 DNS	MAN; 1 Ret	MAN; 2; 3	FAL; 1; 8	FAL; 2; 6	KNU; 1; 3	KNU; 2; 1	ARC; 1; 4	ARC; 2; 2	KAR; 1; 3	KAR; 2; 1	MAN; 1; 6	MAN; 2 Ret	5th	137
2005	Opel Team Sweden	Opel Astra	KNU; 3	KAR; Ret	AND; Ret	FAL; 10	KNU; 10	KAR; 5	VAL; Ret	MAN; 5											8th	67
2007	Opel Team Sweden	Opel Astra GTC 2000	STU; 9	KNU; Ret	MAN; Ret	KAR; 12	AND; 6	VAL; Ret	FAL; Ret	KAR; 9	KNU; 5	STU; 9	MAN; 1								11th	17
2008	Volvo Olsbergs Green Racing	Volvo C30	KNU; 10	STU; Ret	MAN; 2	KAR; Ret	GÖT; 5	STU; 10	FAL; 5	KAR; 6	KNU	VAL; DSQ	MAN; Ret								9th	19
2009	Polestar Racing	Volvo C30	MAN; 1; 2	MAN; 2; 4	KAR; 1; 5	KAR; 2; 8	**GÖT**; **1**; 1	GÖT; 2; 6	KNU; 1; 6	KNU; 2; 6	**FAL**; **1**; 1	FAL; 2; 2	KAR; 1 Ret	KAR; 2 DNS	VAL; 1; 1	VAL; 2; 1	KNU; 1; 4	KNU; 2; 14	MAN; 1; 1	MAN; 2; 5	1st	94
2010	Polestar Racing	Volvo C30	**JYL**; **1**; 1	JYL; 2 Ret	KNU; 1 Ret	KNU; 2 DNS	KAR; 1; 9	KAR; 2; 10	GÖT; 1; 9	GÖT; 2; 11	FAL; 1; 8	**FAL**; **2**; 1	KAR; 1; 10	KAR; 2; 9	JYL; 1; 3	JYL; 2; 4	KNU; 1; 3	KNU; 2; 7	MAN; 1; 6	MAN; 2; 1	7th	143

=== Complete European Touring Car Championship results ===
(key) (Races in bold indicate pole position) (Races in italics indicate fastest lap)

Year	Team	Car	1	2	3	4	5	6	7	8	9	10	11	12	13	14	15	16	17	18	19	20	DC	Pts
2002	RJN Motorsport	Nissan Primera	MAG; 1 Ret	MAG; 2; 10	SIL; 1; 11	SIL; 2 Ret	BRN; 1; 11	BRN; 2; 15†	JAR; 1 DNS	JAR; 2; 10	AND; 1; 14	AND; 2 Ret	OSC; 1; 10	OSC; 2; 10	SPA; 1; 11	SPA; 2 Ret	PER; 1; 16	PER; 2; 15	DON; 1 Ret	DON; 2 DNS	EST; 1; 5	EST; 2; 10	15th	2

† — Did not finish the race, but was classified as he completed over 90% of the race distance.

=== Complete World Touring Car Championship results ===
(key) (Races in bold indicate pole position) (Races in italics indicate fastest lap)

Year	Team	Car	1	2	3	4	5	6	7	8	9	10	11	12	13	14	15	16	17	18	19	20	21	22	23	24	DC	Points
2009	Volvo Olsbergs Green Racing	Volvo C30	BRA; 1	BRA; 2	MEX; 1	MEX; 2	MAR; 1	MAR; 2	FRA; 1	FRA; 2	ESP; 1	ESP; 2	CZE; 1	CZE; 2	POR; 1	POR; 2	GBR; 1 Ret	GBR; 2 Ret	GER; 1	GER; 2	ITA; 1	ITA; 2	JPN; 1	JPN; 2	MAC; 1	MAC; 2	NC†	0†

† – Not eligible for points, as a guest driver.

=== Complete FIA World Rallycross Championship results ===
(key)

==== Supercar ====
Year	Entrant	Car	1	2	3	4	5	6	7	8	9	10	11	12	13	WRX	Points
2014	HTB Racing	Volvo C30	POR	GBR; 21	NOR; 16	FIN	SWE; 18	BEL; 22	CAN	FRA	GER; 9	ITA; 14	TUR	ARG		27th	14
2015	HTB Racing-Marklund Motorsport	Volkswagen Polo	POR	HOC	BEL	GBR	GER	SWE; 12								18th	24
2015	All-Inkl.com Münnich Motorsport	Audi S3							CAN; 4	NOR	FRA	BAR	TUR	ITA	ARG	18th	24
2016	Albatec Racing	Peugeot 208	POR	HOC	BEL	GBR	NOR	SWE	CAN	FRA; 13	BAR	LAT				22nd	4
2016	All-Inkl.com Münnich Motorsport	SEAT Ibiza											GER; 25	ARG		22nd	4
2018	HTB Racing-Marklund Motorsport	Volkswagen Polo	BAR	POR	BEL	GBR; 11	NOR; 13	SWE	CAN	FRA; 16	LAT	USA	GER	RSA		17th	14

=== Complete FIA European Rallycross Championship results ===
(key)

==== Division 2* ====
Year	Entrant	Car	1	2	3	4	5	6	7	8	9	10	11	ERX	Points
1989	Tommy Rustad	Volvo 240	ESP	AUT	SWE	FIN	IRE	FRA	BEL	NED	NOR; 13	GBR	GER	44th	4
1990	Tommy Rustad	Volvo 240	AUT	SWE	FIN	IRE	FRA	BEL	NED	NOR; 14	GER	GBR		41st	3
1991	Tommy Rustad	Ford RS200 E2	POR	AUT	FIN	FRA	IRE	SWE	BEL	NED	NOR; 2	GBR	GER; 2	13th	34
1992	Tommy Rustad	Ford RS200 E2	GBR	AUT	POR	FIN	SWE	FRA; 5	IRE; 1	BEL	NED	NOR; 2	GER	11th	49

^{*} Division 2 was rebranded as Division 1 in 1997.

==== Division 1 ====
Year	Entrant	Car	1	2	3	4	5	6	7	8	9	10	11	ERX	Points
2004	Tommy Rustad	Ford Focus T16	POR	FRA	CZE	AUT	NOR; 6	SWE	BEL	NED	POL	GER		20th	11
2006	Tommy Rustad	Ford Focus T16	POR; 3	FRA; 4	CZE (9)	AUT; 6	SWE; 4	HUN; 2	BEL (10)	NED; 2	NOR; 3	POL; 5	GER; 3	3rd	128
2007	Tommy Rustad	Citroën Xsara T16	POR	FRA	HUN	AUT	SWE	NOR; 2	BEL	NED	POL	CZE		18th	17

==== Supercar ====
Year	Entrant	Car	1	2	3	4	5	6	7	8	9	ERX	Points
2013	Tommy Rustad	Volvo C30	GBR	POR	HUN	FIN	NOR; 8	SWE; 17	FRA	AUT	GER	20th	16
2014	HTB Racing	Volvo C30	GBR; 12	NOR; 8	BEL; 13	GER; 6	ITA; 7					6th	39
2015	HTB Racing-Marklund Motorsport	Volkswagen Polo	BEL; 4	GER; 1	NOR; 1	BAR; 6	ITA; 1					1st	135
2016	Albatec-HTB Racing	Peugeot 208	BEL; 5	NOR; 7	SWE; 3	BAR; 2	LAT; 1					4th	94
2017	Albatec-HTB Racing	Peugeot 208	BAR; 9	NOR; 6	SWE; 9	FRA; 6	LAT; 4					5th	86

Sporting positions
Preceded by Franck Lagorce	Renault Sport Spider Elf Trophy Champion; 1997	Succeeded by Andrea Belicchi
Preceded by Mattias Ekström	Swedish Touring Car Champion; 2000	Succeeded by Roberto Colciago
Preceded by Richard Göransson	Swedish Touring Car Champion; 2009	Succeeded by Richard Göransson
Preceded by Robin Larsson	European Rallycross Supercar Champion; 2015	Succeeded by Kevin Hansen
