= Mattias Andersson (racing driver) =

Swedish racing driver (born 1973)

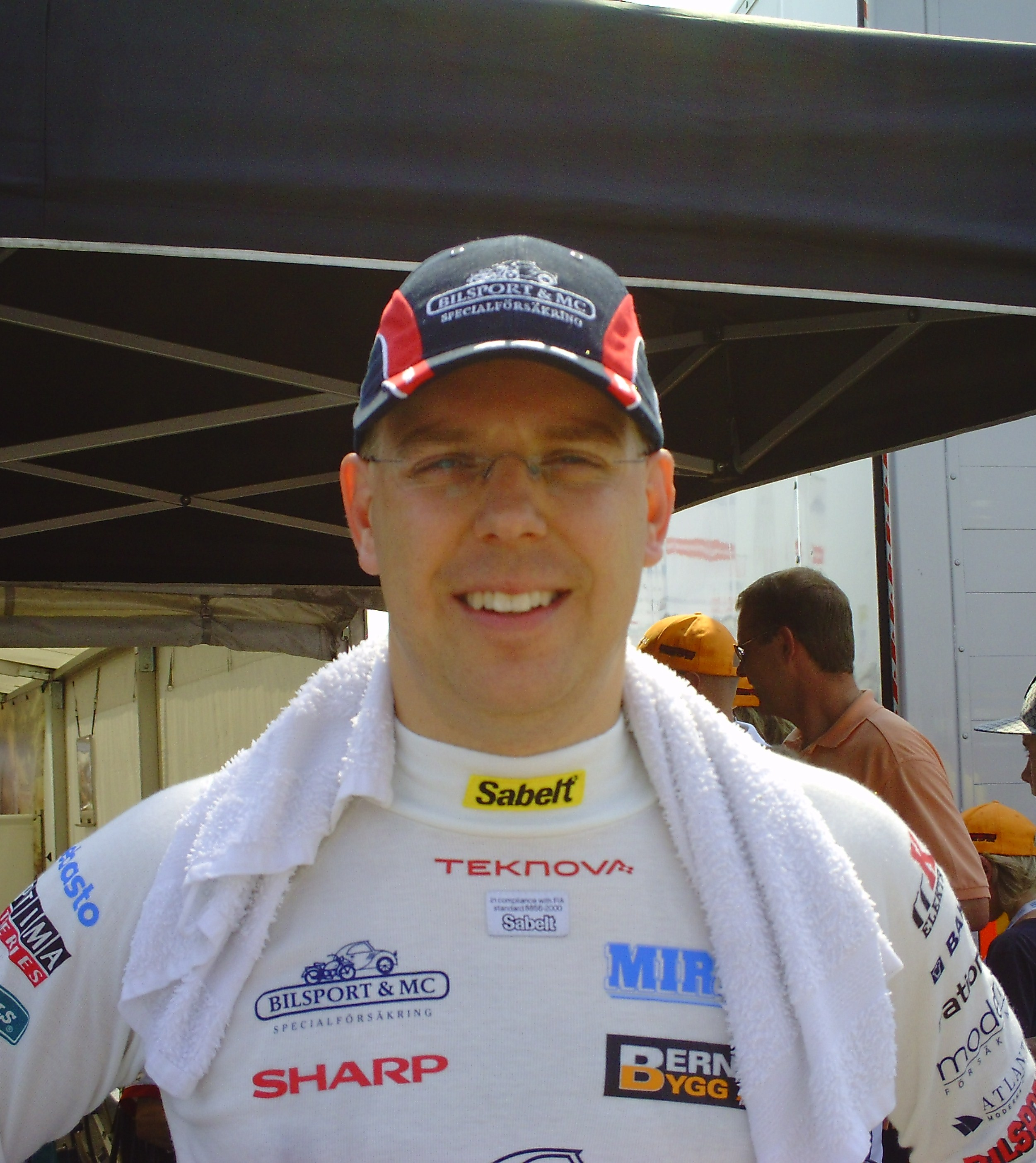
- Nationality: (Sweden) Swedish
- Born: Hans Olof Mattias Andersson; 9 May 1973 (age 53) Åtvidaberg, Sweden
- Relatives: Viktor Andersson (son)

Scandinavian Touring Car Championship career
- Current team: Honda Racing Sweden
- Car number: 20
- Former teams: WestCoast Racing, Team Italienska Bil, MA:GP, Flash Engineering

Previous series
- 2012: TTA – Racing Elite League

Hans Olof Mattias Andersson (born 9 May 1973 in Åtvidaberg) is a Swedish race car driver and Eurosport commentator, who currently resides in Linköping, Sweden. He started his career in Scandinavian Formula Opel in 1991 and continued in Scandinavia until 1996, when he joined the Barber Dodge Pro Series. He moved to Indy Lights in 1998, where he drove a select few races, before moving on to the Swedish Touring Car Championship in a works Opel Vectra. In 2003, he drove a BMW 320i in the STCC for WestCoast Racing, before moving to Team Italienska Bil in an Alfa Romeo 156 in 2004. Since 2006, he has driven that car for his own team, MA:GP.

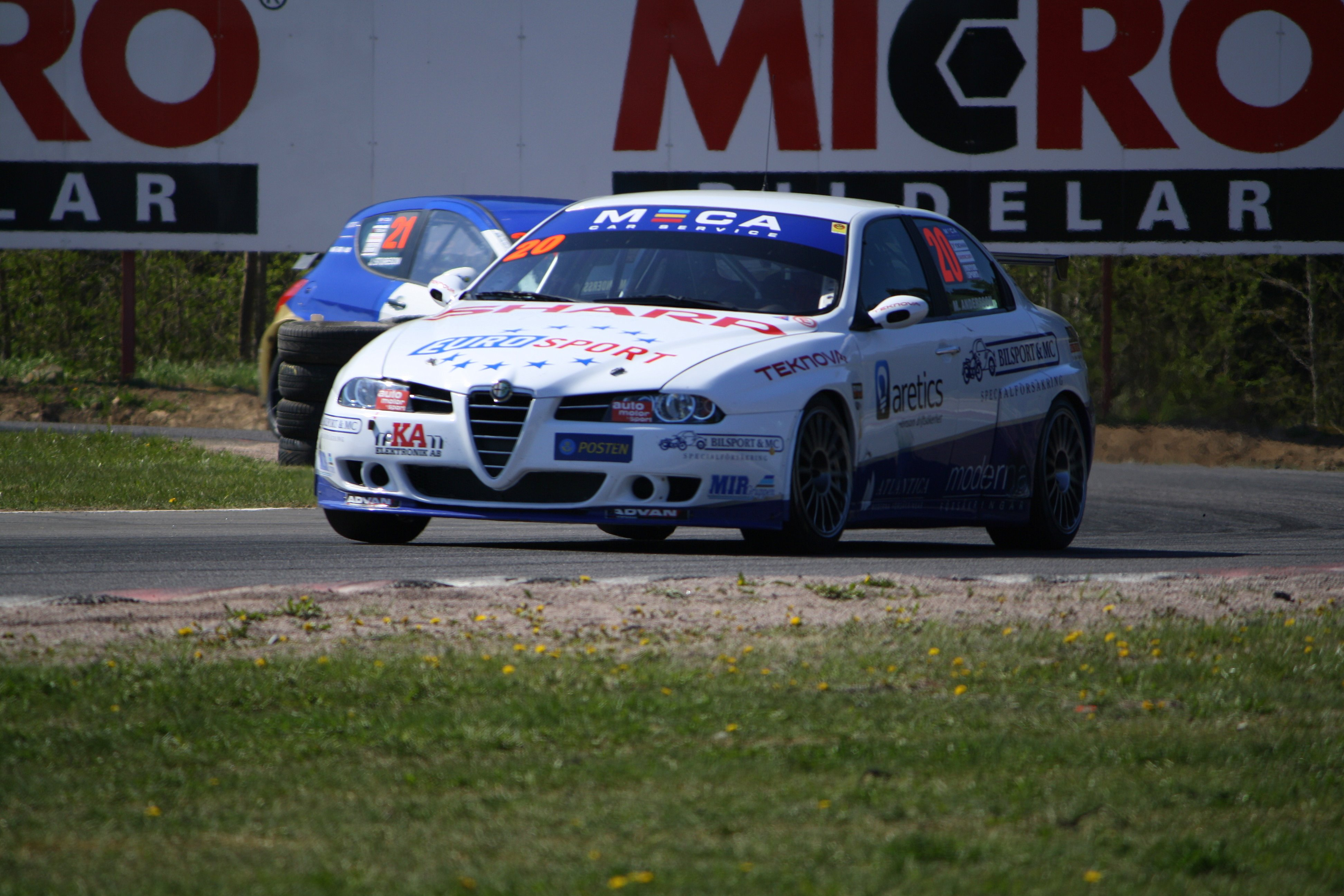
Mattias Andersson with Alfa Romeo 156 in STCC Mantorp 2009.

== American open–wheel racing results ==
(key) (Races in bold indicate pole position) (Races in italics indicate fastest lap)

=== Indy Lights ===
Year	Team	1	2	3	4	5	6	7	8	9	10	11	12	13	14	Rank	Points	Ref
1996	Brian Stewart Racing	MIA; 20	LBH; 13	NAZ	MIS	MIL	DET	POR	CLE	TOR	TRO	VAN	LAG			**30th**	**0**	
1998	Brian Stewart Racing	MIA; 15	LBH; 7	NAZ; 17	STL	MIL	DET	POR	CLE	TOR	MIS	TRO	VAN	LAG	FON	**25th**	**6**	

=== Atlantic Championship ===
Year	Team	1	2	3	4	5	6	7	8	9	10	11	12	Rank	Points
1997	BRS Motorsport	HMS	LBH	NAZ	MIL	MTL	CLE	TOR	TRR	MDO	ROA	VAN	LAG; 15	**38th**	**1**
