= Tommy Kristoffersson =

Swedish racing driver

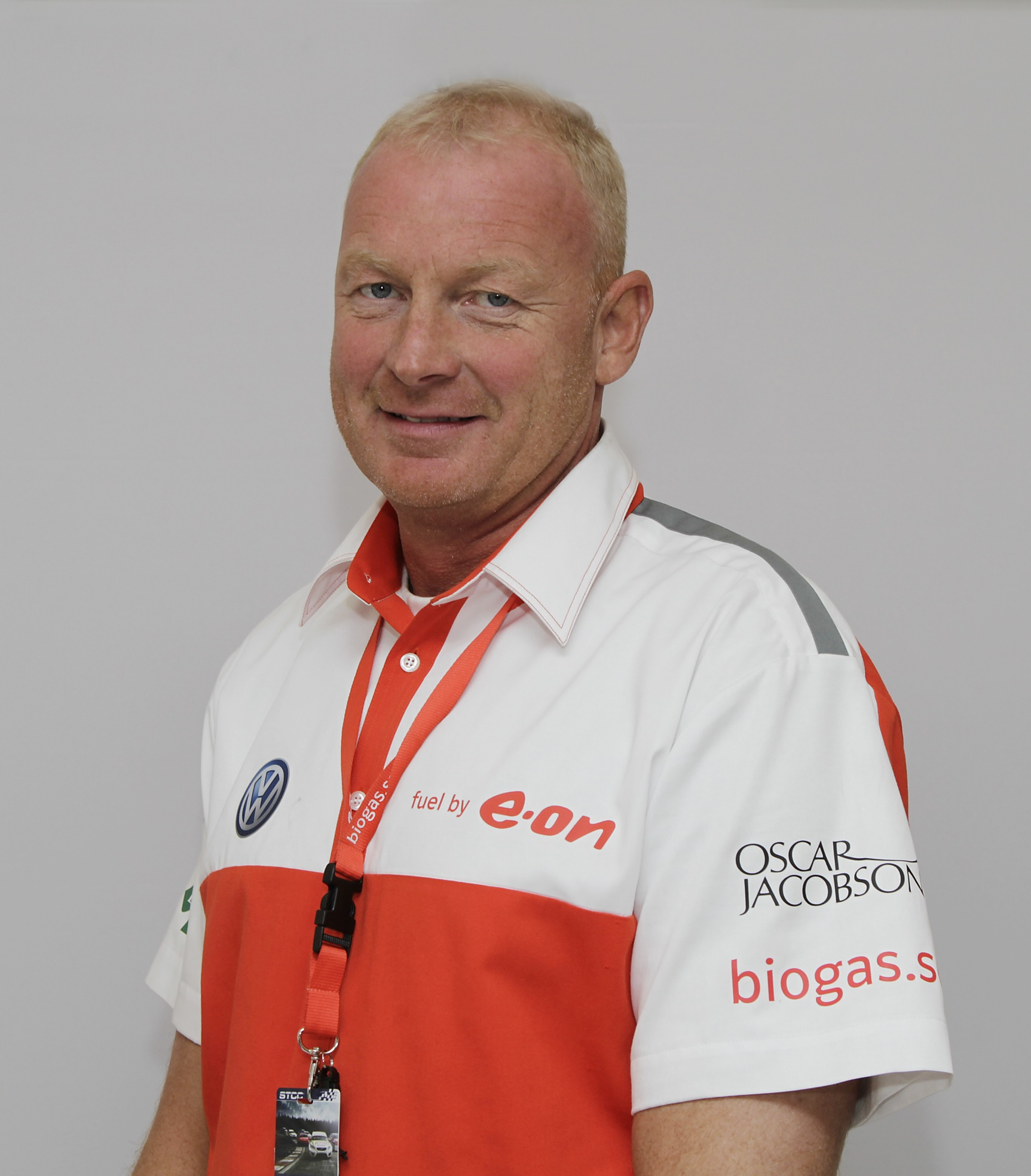
- Tommy Kristoffersson in 2011
- Nationality: (Sweden) Swedish
- Born: Tommy Sten Kristoffersson; May 1, 1959 (age 67) Eda, Sweden
- Retired: 2009
- Relatives: Johan Kristoffersson (son)

FIA ERX Division 1 (1997–2010) Championship
- Years active: 1997–1998
- Former teams: Kristoffersson Motorsport
- Starts: 8
- Wins: 1
- Podiums: 1
- Best finish: 7th in 1997

FIA ERX Division 2 (1982–1996) Championship
- Years active: 1989–1996
- Starts: 68
- Wins: 2
- Podiums: 17
- Best finish: 3rd in 1993

Tommy Sten Kristoffersson, actually Tommy Sten Kristoffersen, (born 1 May 1959 in Eda) is a Swedish race car driver whose father hails from Denmark. In the beginning of his career he competed in rallycross for Audi before starting a team in the Swedish Touring Car Championship (STCC) in 1998 running Audi A4 Quattros with himself as one of the drivers. Tommy Kristoffersson has competed for his team from 1998 to 2008, finishing 4th overall in 1998 and 2001. He retired from the STCC before the start of the 2009 season, as Kristoffersson Motorsport was struggling in the championship three years after Audi pulled out from backing his team.

As of 2015 he is the team principal of Volkswagen Team Sweden, taking part in the FIA World Rallycross Championship.

== Racing record ==
=== Complete FIA European Rallycross Championship results ===
==== Division 2^{*} ====
Year	Entrant	Car	1	2	3	4	5	6	7	8	9	10	11	12	ERX	Points
1989	Kristoffersson Motorsport	Audi Quattro	SPA	AUT	SWE; NC	FIN; 14	IRE	FRA	BEL	NED	NOR	GBR	GER		51st	3
1990	Kristoffersson Motorsport	Audi Quattro	AUT	SWE; 10	FIN; 4	IRE; 9	FRA	BEL; 6	NED; 8	NOR; 13	GER; 7	GBR			9th	62
1991	Kristoffersson Motorsport	Audi Quattro	POR; 7	AUT; 7	FIN; 3	FRA; 3	IRE; 4	SWE (7)	BEL; 5	NED (16)	NOR; 3	GBR; 8	GER (7)		4th	90
1992	Kristoffersson Motorsport	Audi Quattro	GBR	AUT	POR	FIN; 2	SWE; 4	FRA	IRE	BEL; 3	NED; 1	NOR; 9	GER; 3		6th	88
1993	Kristoffersson Motorsport	Audi S2 Coupé	AUT (5)	POR; 3	FRA; 2	IRE; 2	SWE; 2	FIN; 1	BEL (4)	NED (11)	NOR; 4	GER; 4			3rd	112
1994	Kristoffersson Motorsport	Audi S2 Coupé	AUT; 3	POR (10)	FRA; 6	IRE (NC)	GBR	SWE; 3	FIN; 5	BEL (9)	NED; 4	NOR; 4	GER; 3		5th	94
1995	Kristoffersson Motorsport	Audi S2 Coupé	AUT; 4	POR (NC)	FRA (NC)	SWE; 4	IRE; 10	GBR; 6	BEL; 5	NED (NC)	NOR; 6	FIN; 2	CZE (NC)	GER; 4	6th	97
1996	Kristoffersson Motorsport	Audi S2 Coupé	AUT; 5	POR; 3	FRA (11)	SWE (8)	IRE (8)	GBR; 7	BEL; 6	NED; 6	NOR; 6	CZE; 7	GER (8)		8th	80

^{*} Division 2 was rebranded as Division 1 in 1997.

==== Division 1 ====
Year	Entrant	Car	1	2	3	4	5	6	7	8	9	10	ERX	Points
1997	Kristoffersson Motorsport	Audi S2 Coupé	AUT; 6	FRA	POR	GBR	SWE; 7	FIN; 4	BEL; 4	NOR; 10	CZE; 11	GER; 4	7th	73
1998	Kristoffersson Motorsport	Audi S2 Coupé	AUT	POR	FRA	SWE; 1	GBR	FIN	BEL	NOR	GER	CZE	13th	20

== Personal life ==
He is the father of touring car driver and world rallycross champion Johan Kristoffersson.
