= Engström Motorsport =

Engström Motorsport is a Swedish motorsport team owned by its driver Tomas Engström.

== Camaro Cup ==
The team started competing in the Swedish Camaro Cup series in 1991. After finishing runner-up in 1993 the team and Engström took five straight championship titles, the first in 1994 and the last in 1998. Engström also won 32 of his 45 cup races.

== STCC ==
=== Chrysler ===
In 1999 the team moved up to race in the Swedish Touring Car Championship as the Chrysler works team under the Chrysler Racing Team Sweden name, running a 1998 spec Stratus for Engström. The car lacked paced and Engström finished 13th in the standings. The next season went better, with some top five finishes and tenth overall. The team switched name to DC Motorsport in 2001 and competed in the privateers cup, where Engström finishing third.

=== Honda ===
After Hubert Bergh Motorsport, the team that had run the Honda works team, withdrew from the series Engström Motorsport became their replacement. With a 2001-spec Honda Accord Engström finished fifth in the 2002 season, in which he also won his first STCC race.

STCC switched to Super 2000 rules in 2003 and the Accord was replaced by a Honda Civic Type-R. Now called Honda Dealer Team Sweden Engström continued to be the team's only driver and now had his most successful STCC season, winning one race and finishing third overall. The team expanded to two cars for 2004 with Jens Hellström driving the Civic. Engström finished sixth in the standings and Hellström ninth, but neither won any races. Engström also took part in two races in the Finnish Touring Car Championship.

In 2005 Engström's Civic was replaced by an Accord Euro-R while Hellström kept the Civic. Engström won one race and finished fifth overall, while Hellström had a bad season and ended up thirteenth, two places behind independent Civic Type-R driver Daniel Haglöf. The team also took part in two weekends in the World Touring Car Championship. Neither driver scored any overall points, but Engström did win one race and finished ninth overall in the independent's cup.

Engström Motorsport did not retain Hellström for the 2006 season. Instead they ran a brand new Honda Accord Euro-R for Engström, who took several podium finishes but no win and finished fifth overall. The team finished the season in Portugal and the European Touring Car Cup, where Engström finished on a noticeable third place behind GR Asia SEAT drivers Ryan Sharp and Emmet O'Brien.
