= Swedish Touring Car Championship =

Touring car racing championship in Sweden

- Category: Touring cars
- Country: Sweden, Norway
- Inaugural season: 1996
- Folded: 2010
- Last Drivers' champion: (Sweden) Richard Göransson
- Last Makes' champion: Volvo
- Last Teams' champion: Polestar Racing
- Official website: stcc.se

Swedish Touring Car Championship (STCC) was a touring car racing series based in Sweden, but also with rounds in Norway. They began operating in 1996, heavily influenced by the British Touring Car Championship and the success of BTCC racing on Swedish television. STCC replaced the 1991–1995 Nordic Touring Car Championship. There were also a number of accompanying support classes that raced alongside STCC; Radical, the Camaro Cup, Superkart, Pro Superbike, the JTCC and the Porsche Carrera Cup Scandinavia. The final STCC season was in 2010, as the series merged with the Danish Touringcar Championship to form the Scandinavian Touring Car Championship.

== Rules ==
The cars were built according to the Super 2000 rules used in the FIA WTCC. A national counterpart, N2000, also exists to encourage teams to build their own cars without having to have them homologated by FIA. So far Audi, Volvo, Opel, and Mercedes have constructed their own cars.

Points System (as of 2006)

Position	1st	2nd	3rd	4th	5th	6th	7th	8th
Points	10	8	6	5	4	3	2	1

Qualifying & Race
Every racing weekend consist of the following:

- Qualifying: First, a 20-minute qualifying session open to all drivers is run. The eight fastest drivers in the 20 minute session go on to drive in the Super pole. Drivers from 9th quickest and backwards start in the qualifying order for the first race. The grid for the second race is reversed results of top eight from the results of the first race. The cars behind top eight start in the position they finished in race one.
- Super Pole: Super pole is a one-lap shootout for the first eight grid positions of race one. The driver with the 8th fastest qualifying time is the first to run a Super Pole lap. Each of the remaining seven drivers run their Super Pole lap in order of slowest to fastest. In the end, the driver with the fastest Super Pole lap starts the race from pole, or first, position.
- Race: There are two races in a race weekend and each race is approximately 20 minutes in length. All races start using a rolling start.

== TV Coverage ==
STCC was first aired in 1997 on SVT, featured in the program called "Race" along with the British Touring Car Championship. BTCC was dropped by SVT at the end of the 1999 season and was replaced by CART, while STCC stayed. When BTCC, which had been the main focus of Race, was dropped, STCC was upgraded to be the series which the program had its focus on. Previously when BTCC and STCC clashed, the STCC races were shown in-between the two BTCC races. This was changed for the 2000 season, and now CART was shown in-between the two STCC races. In 2002 VEIDEC Trophy, a motorcycle class that raced on the STCC-weekends, replaced CART on the program. All Race programs were either 30 or 45 minutes in length, depending on if one or two series were featured.
In 2003 STCC coverage moved from SVT to TV4. The program was now shown on TV4 Plus, a channel which not everyone had access to (at the time only SVT1, SVT2 and TV4 was available to all viewers for free). TV4 only kept STCC for a year, selling it to TV3. The races appeared again in a highlights format on TV3 during 2004, but in 2005 the coverage was extended to include several hours of live coverage from each race weekend on the TV3-owned sports channel Viasat Sport.
In 2006 STCC returned to SVT and Race, again being available to all viewers, but coverage was cut down to only a 30-minute highlight program. The final season was broadcast by another TV3-owned channel, Viasat Motor.

== Car brands ==
The cars competing in the STCC were in 2010: Alfa Romeo, BMW, Chevrolet, Honda, Opel, Peugeot, SEAT, Volkswagen and Volvo.

== Champions ==
Season	Championship			Independent	
Season	Driver	Manufacturer	Team	Driver	Manufacturer
1996	(Sweden) Jan Nilsson	Volvo	Flash Engineering	none	
1997	(Sweden) Jan Nilsson	Volvo	Flash Engineering	none	
1998	(Sweden) Fredrik Ekblom	BMW	WestCoast Racing	(Sweden) Pontus Mörth	Opel
1999	(Sweden) Mattias Ekström	Audi	Kristoffersson Motorsport	(Norway) Kim Esbjug	BMW
2000	(Norway) Tommy Rustad	Nissan	Crawford Nissan Racing	(Sweden) Magnus Krokström	Audi
2001	(Italy) Roberto Colciago	Audi	Kristoffersson Motorsport	(Sweden) Tobias Johansson	Audi
2002	(Italy) Roberto Colciago	Audi	Kristoffersson Motorsport	(Sweden) Tobias Johansson	Audi
2003	(Sweden) Fredrik Ekblom	Audi	Kristoffersson Motorsport	none	
2004	(Sweden) Richard Göransson	BMW	WestCoast Racing	(Sweden) Johan Nilsson	Volvo
2005	(Sweden) Richard Göransson	BMW	WestCoast Racing	(Sweden) Johan Nilsson	BMW
2006	(Sweden) Thed Björk	BMW	Kristoffersson Motorsport	(Sweden) Joakim Fridh	BMW
2007	(Sweden) Fredrik Ekblom	BMW	WestCoast Racing	(Sweden) Joakim Fridh	Opel
2008	(Sweden) Richard Göransson	BMW	Flash Engineering	(Sweden) Tobias Johansson	Mercedes-Benz
2009	(Norway) Tommy Rustad	Volvo	Polestar Racing	(Sweden) Viktor Hallrup	BMW
2010	(Sweden) Richard Göransson	BMW	WestCoast Racing	(Sweden) Andreas Ebbesson	BMW
