= Ring Knutstorp =

Motor racing circuit in Kågeröd, Sweden

- Full Circuit (1980–present)
- Location: Kågeröd, Sweden
- Coordinates: 55°59′15″N 13°6′53″E
- FIA Grade: 4
- Opened: 1963
- Major events: Current: Radical Cup Scandinavia (2019–present); Future: STCC (1996–2022, 2024, 2027); Former: NXT Gen Cup (2023); Porsche Carrera Cup Scandinavia (2004–2021); European F3 (1976–1984); European RX (1973–1978, 1980–1982, 1984, 1986, 1988)
- Website: http://www.ringknutstorp.com/

Full Circuit (1980–present)
- Length: 2.079 km (1.292 mi)
- Turns: 14
- Race lap record: 0:55.501 ( (Sweden) Patric Sundel, PVP Superkart, 2009, Superkart)

Full Circuit (1970–1979)
- Length: 2.200 km (1.367 mi)
- Turns: 15
- Race lap record: 1:00.720 ( (France) Alain Prost, Martini MK27, 1979, F3)

Original Circuit (1963–1969)
- Length: 1.100 km (0.684 mi)
- Turns: 8

Ring Knutstorp is a motor racing circuit in Kågeröd, Sweden, just west of the Knutstorp Castle and 60 km (37 mi) north of Malmö. The circuit was built in 1963, extended in 1970, and modified to its present configuration in 1980.

Ring Knutstorp has hosted rounds of Swedish and Danish national championships including the Swedish Touring Car Championship, Scandinavian Touring Car Championship and Danish Touringcar Championship. During the 1970, rounds of the Formula Three European Cup were held at the circuit, with winners including Alain Prost. The track was used during the 1984 European Rallycross Championship season. It is a playable track in the video game STCC – The Game.

== Lap records ==
As of September 2024, the fastest official race lap records at the Ring Knutstorp are listed as:

Category	Time	Driver	Vehicle	Event
Full Circuit (1980–present): 2.079 km (1.292 mi)
Superkart	0:55.501	Patric Sundel	PVP Superkart	2009 Knutstorp Swedish Superkart round
Formula Renault 2.0	0:55.666	Daniel Roos	Tatuus FR2000	2010 Knutstorp Formula Renault 2.0 Sweden round
Formula Three	0:56.801	Alain Ferté	Martini MK34	1981 Knutstorp European F3 round
Porsche Carrera Cup	0:57.741	Lukas Sundahl	Porsche 911 (991 II) GT3 Cup	2018 Knutstorp Porsche Carrera Cup Scandinavia round
Silhouette racing car	0:58.184	Johan Kristoffersson	SEAT León STCC	2016 Knutstorp STCC round
Superbike	0:58.509	Andreas Mårtensson	Honda CBR1000RR	2009 Knutstorp Pro Superbike round
Super Touring	1:00.187	Jan Nilsson	Volvo S40	2002 2nd Knutstorp STCC round
TCR Touring Car	1:00.291	Robert Dahlgren	CUPRA León TCR	2018 Knutstorp STCC round
Super 2000	1:00.571	Fredrik Ekblom	BMW 320si	2008 1st Knutstorp STCC round
STCC Electric Car	1:05.651	Jimmy Eriksson	Tesla Model 3 ETCR	2024 Knutstorp STCC round
NXT Gen Cup	1:10.398	Linus Granfors	LRT NXT1	2023 Knutstorp NXT Gen Cup round
Full Circuit (1970–1979): 2.200 km (1.367 mi)
Formula Three	1:00.720	Alain Prost	Martini MK27	1979 Knutstorp European F3 round
