= 2009 Swedish Touring Car Championship =

Seasons
- ← 2008 2010 →

The 2009 Swedish Touring Car Championship season was the 14th Swedish Touring Car Championship (STCC) season. It was decided over nine race weekends (comprising eighteen races) at six different circuits.

Tommy Rustad won the drivers' championship for the second time. The ethanol powered Volvo C30 of Polestar Racing proved to be the fastest car over one lap, as evidenced by them setting all fastest qualifying times during the season (although grid penalties ruined the perfect score), but they were plagued by bad reliability. Instead, Thed Björk, driving for Flash Engineering, lead the championship most of the season, only to be overtaken in the last race.

The team championship also went down to the wire, with Polestar Racing besting WestCoast Racing by one point in the last race.

The entry of the Biogas.se team with their Volkswagen Scirocco meant the debut of a biogas powered car in STCC. Unfortunately, they had trouble matching the pace of the other factory teams and ended up last in the team championship.

== Changes for 2009 ==
There were several rule changes for the 2009 season.

Race format changes:

- Two races of approximately 20 minutes were held each race weekend.
- There were no mandatory pitstops in either race.
- The starting grid of the first race was determined by qualifying.
- The starting grid of the second race was determined by the results from the first race with the top eight positions reversed.
- The qualifying was divided into two sessions, where the eight fastest from the first (20 minutes) session moved on to the second (10 minutes) session.
- Both races used rolling starts.

Other changes:

- Yokohama replaced Michelin as tyre supplier.
- Each race weekend, the team that scored most points received a price sum of 100.000 SEK. For this purpose, some of the one-car teams combined two and two.
- The winner of the team championship was awarded an additional 100.000 SEK.
- The manufacturers' championship was dropped.

== Drivers ==
These were the STCC entries for the 2009 season. Drivers with numbers 88 and higher also competed in Semcon Cup, open for privateers only. All teams were Swedish-registered.

Team	Car	No.	Drivers	Class	Rounds
WestCoast Racing	BMW 320si E90	1	(Sweden) Richard Göransson	D	All
WestCoast Racing	BMW 320si E90	4	(Sweden) Robin Rudholm	D	All
Biogas.se	Volkswagen Scirocco	2	(Sweden) Fredrik Ekblom	D	All
Biogas.se	Volkswagen Scirocco	11	(Sweden) Patrik Olsson	D	All
Flash Engineering	BMW 320si E90	3	(Sweden) Thed Björk	D	All
Flash Engineering	BMW 320si E90	6	(Sweden) Jan "Flash" Nilsson	D	All
Flash Engineering	BMW 320si E90	92	(Sweden) Tobias Tegelby	S	17–18
Polestar Racing	Volvo C30	5	(Sweden) Robert Dahlgren	D	All
Polestar Racing	Volvo C30	10	(Norway) Tommy Rustad	D	All
Chevrolet Motorsport Sweden; Nordic Fine Art	Chevrolet Lacetti				
Chevrolet Motorsport Sweden; Nordic Fine Art	Chevrolet Lacetti	7	(Norway) Thomas Schie	D	1–6
Chevrolet Motorsport Sweden; Nordic Fine Art	Chevrolet Lacetti	12	(Sweden) Pontus Mörth	D	7–18
Chevrolet Motorsport Sweden; Nordic Fine Art	SEAT León	9	(Sweden) Roger Eriksson	D	All
Engström Motorsport	Honda Accord	8	(Sweden) Tomas Engström	D	All
MA:GP; IPS Motorsport	Alfa Romeo 156	20	(Sweden) Mattias Andersson	D	All
MA:GP; IPS Motorsport	Peugeot 308	21	(Sweden) Johan Stureson	D	All
Team CaWalli	BMW 320i E46	88	(Sweden) Viktor Hallrup	S	All
Team CaWalli	BMW 320i E46	93	(Sweden) Dick Sahlén	S	All
Team MECA	Alfa Romeo 156 GTA	89	(Sweden) Claes Hoffsten	S	All
G-Rex Sweden	Mercedes-Benz C200	91	(Sweden) Tony Johansson	S	1–6,9–12
Micke Ohlsson Motorsport	Peugeot 407/BMW 320i E46	94	(Sweden) Mikael Ohlsson	S	1–10,15–16
Kristoffersson Motorsport	Audi A4	95	(Sweden) Andreas Simonsen	S	5–6,9–10
Kristoffersson Motorsport	Audi A4	98	(Sweden) Johan Kristoffersson	S	All
Huggare Racing	Opel Astra	96	(Sweden) Viktor Huggare	S	All
Mälarpower Motorsport	Volvo S60	99	(Sweden) Ronnie Brandt	S	5–8,11–14,17–18

Icon	Class
D	Drivers' Championship
S	Semcon Cup

* Mikko Tiainen, Petter Granlund and Joakim Ahlberg were on the official entry list, but failed to participate in any races during the season.

== Race calendar ==
The race calendar for this season was as follows:

Round	Circuit/Location	Date
1 & 2	(Sweden) Mantorp Park	May 2
3 & 4	(Sweden) Karlskoga Motorstadion	May 23
5 & 6	(Sweden) Göteborg City Race	June 6
7 & 8	(Sweden) Ring Knutstorp	June 27
9 & 10	(Sweden) Falkenbergs Motorbana	July 11
11 & 12	(Sweden) Karlskoga Motorstadion	August 15
13 & 14	(Norway) Vålerbanen	August 29
15 & 16	(Sweden) Ring Knutstorp	September 12
17 & 18	(Sweden) Mantorp Park	September 26

== Results and standings ==
The points system used for both the main championship and Semcon Cup was the standard FIA system of 10-8-6-5-4-3-2-1, awarded to the top eight finishers of each race. In case of ties in points, the championship positions were determined by the classification in the latest race.

=== Races ===
Round	Circuit/Location	Pole position	Fastest lap	Winning driver	Winning team	Highest Scoring Team	Winning privateer
1	(Sweden) Mantorp Park	(Sweden) Robert Dahlgren	(Sweden) Robert Dahlgren	(Sweden) Robert Dahlgren	Polestar Racing	Flash Engineering	(Sweden) Johan Kristoffersson
2	(Sweden) Mantorp Park	(Norway) Thomas Schie	(Sweden) Thed Björk	(Sweden) Richard Göransson	WestCoast Racing	Flash Engineering	(Sweden) Johan Kristoffersson
3	(Sweden) Karlskoga Motorstadion	(Sweden) Robin Rudholm*	(Sweden) Robin Rudholm	(Sweden) Robin Rudholm	WestCoast Racing	WestCoast Racing	(Sweden) Johan Kristoffersson
4	(Sweden) Karlskoga Motorstadion	(Sweden) Roger Eriksson	(Sweden) Robin Rudholm	(Sweden) Robin Rudholm	WestCoast Racing	WestCoast Racing	(Sweden) Viktor Hallrup
5	(Sweden) Göteborg City Race	(Norway) Tommy Rustad*	(Sweden) Robert Dahlgren	(Norway) Tommy Rustad	Polestar Racing	MA:GP/IPS	(Sweden) Andreas Simonsen
6	(Sweden) Göteborg City Race	(Sweden) Fredrik Ekblom	(Sweden) Robert Dahlgren	(Sweden) Tomas Engström	Engström Motorsport	MA:GP/IPS	(Sweden) Viktor Hallrup
7	(Sweden) Ring Knutstorp	(Sweden) Robert Dahlgren	(Sweden) Robin Rudholm	(Sweden) Robert Dahlgren	Polestar Racing	WestCoast Racing	(Sweden) Dick Sahlén
8	(Sweden) Ring Knutstorp	(Sweden) Roger Eriksson	(Sweden) Robin Rudholm	(Sweden) Jan Nilsson	Flash Engineering	WestCoast Racing	(Sweden) Dick Sahlén
9	(Sweden) Falkenbergs Motorbana	(Norway) Tommy Rustad	(Norway) Tommy Rustad	(Norway) Tommy Rustad	Polestar Racing	WestCoast Racing	(Sweden) Johan Kristoffersson
10	(Sweden) Falkenbergs Motorbana	(Sweden) Tomas Engström	(Sweden) Thed Björk	(Sweden) Richard Göransson	WestCoast Racing	WestCoast Racing	(Sweden) Andreas Simonsen
11	(Sweden) Karlskoga Motorstadion	(Sweden) Robert Dahlgren	(Sweden) Jan Nilsson	(Sweden) Jan Nilsson	Flash Engineering	WestCoast Racing	(Sweden) Tony Johansson
12	(Sweden) Karlskoga Motorstadion	(Sweden) Patrik Olsson	(Sweden) Robert Dahlgren	(Sweden) Robert Dahlgren	Polestar Racing	WestCoast Racing	(Sweden) Dick Sahlén
13	(Norway) Vålerbanen	(Sweden) Robert Dahlgren	(Norway) Tommy Rustad	(Norway) Tommy Rustad	Polestar Racing	Polestar Racing	(Sweden) Viktor Hallrup
14	(Norway) Vålerbanen	(Sweden) Pontus Mörth	(Sweden) Thed Björk	(Norway) Tommy Rustad	Polestar Racing	Polestar Racing	(Sweden) Dick Sahlén
15	(Sweden) Ring Knutstorp	(Sweden) Robert Dahlgren	(Sweden) Robert Dahlgren	(Sweden) Richard Göransson	WestCoast Racing	MA:GP/IPS	(Sweden) Viktor Hallrup
16	(Sweden) Ring Knutstorp	(Sweden) Patrik Olsson	(Sweden) Thed Björk	(Sweden) Johan Stureson	IPS Motorsport	MA:GP/IPS	(Sweden) Mikael Ohlsson
17	(Sweden) Mantorp Park	(Sweden) Robin Rudholm^{♯}	(Sweden) Robert Dahlgren	(Norway) Tommy Rustad	Polestar Racing	Polestar Racing	(Sweden) Johan Kristoffersson
18	(Sweden) Mantorp Park	(Sweden) Tomas Engström	(Sweden) Robert Dahlgren	(Sweden) Robert Dahlgren	Polestar Racing	Polestar Racing	(Sweden) Johan Kristoffersson

* Robert Dahlgren set the fastest qualifying time, but was moved down 10 places on the grid, due to engine changes.

^{♯} Robert Dahlgren set the fastest qualifying time, but was moved down 10 places on the grid, due to having received two yellow cards for unfair driving.

=== Drivers championship ===
The drivers' championship was won by Tommy Rustad. In the end he scored the same number of points as Thed Björk, but won thanks to finishing higher in the last race.

Pos.	Driver	MAN (Sweden)		KAR (Sweden)		GÖT (Sweden)		KNU (Sweden)		FAL (Sweden)		KAR (Sweden)		VÅL (Norway)		KNU (Sweden)		MAN (Sweden)		Pts
1	(Norway) Tommy Rustad	2	4	5	8	**1**	6	6	6	**1**	2	Ret	DNS	1	1	4	14*	1	5	94
2	(Sweden) Thed Björk	4	2	4	3	2	4	3	Ret	2	3	4	4	2	3	2	11	4	Ret	94
3	(Sweden) Robin Rudholm	Ret	11	**1**	1	10	9	2	2	7	5	3	3	6	2	5	9	**2**	6	80
4	(Sweden) Richard Göransson	3	1	11	5	9	7	4	5	3	1	2	5	9	9	1	Ret	3	Ret	75
5	(Sweden) Mattias Andersson	6	5	Ret	10	3	5	7	4	Ret	7	5	2	5	Ret	9	6	6	2	56
6	(Sweden) Jan "Flash" Nilsson	5	3	3	7	11	16	5	1	6	12	1	8	Ret	7	3	Ret	9	Ret	54
7	(Sweden) Robert Dahlgren	**1**	Ret	6	16	17	8	**1**	3	Ret	DNS	**6**	1	**Ret**	4	**Ret**	15^{♯}	5	1	52
8	(Sweden) Tomas Engström	Ret	10	2	6	7	1	9	11	8	4	7	14	3	Ret	12	3	8	3	50
9	(Sweden) Johan Stureson	7	8	7	2	6	2	Ret	Ret	4	19	Ret	DNS	7	5	6	1	Ret	Ret	48
10	(Sweden) Roger Eriksson	9	6	8	4	4	3	8	7	5	13	Ret	Ret	4	11	13	4	Ret	7	39
11	(Sweden) Pontus Mörth							Ret	9	12	6	9	7	8	8	11	8	7	4	15
12	(Sweden) Patrik Olsson	14	15	16	12	15	11	10	8	13	9	8	6	10	13	8	2	11	9	14
13	(Sweden) Fredrik Ekblom	11	9	10	9	8	10	Ret	10	9	17	Ret	Ret	DNS	6	14	5	10	8	9
14	(Norway) Thomas Schie	8	7	9	Ret	5	DNS													7
15	(Sweden) Mikael Ohlsson	15	16	18	DNS	Ret	Ret	16	14	15	14					10	7			2
16	(Sweden) Viktor Hallrup	12	13	14	11	13	12	12	13	14	11	13	10	11	12	7	Ret	13	11	2
17	(Sweden) Andreas Simonsen					12	14			11	8									1
18	(Sweden) Johan Kristoffersson	10	12	12	13	Ret	DNS	14	15	10	10	11	11	Ret	16	Ret	10	12	10	0
19	(Sweden) Tobias Tegelby																	15	12	0
20	(Sweden) Dick Sahlén	16	17	13	17	14	13	11	12	17	15	Ret	9	12	9	Ret	12	14	13	0
21	(Sweden) Viktor Huggare	13	14	15	15	16	15	13	Ret	16	16	15	12	13	10	15	13	Ret	14	0
22	(Sweden) Claes Hoffsten	Ret	DNS	17	14	Ret	DNS	15	16	18	18	12	13	14	14	Ret	DNS	DNS	DNS	0
23	(Sweden) Ronnie Brandt					DNS	DNS	DNS	DNS			14	Ret	15	15			DNS	DNS	0
24	(Sweden) Tony Johansson	DNS	DNS	DNS	DNS	Ret	Ret			19	Ret	10	Ret							0

Colour	Result
Gold	Winner
Silver	Second place
Bronze	Third place
Green	Points classification
Blue	Non-points classification
Blue	Non-classified finish (NC)
Purple	Retired, not classified (Ret)
Red	Did not qualify (DNQ)
Red	Did not pre-qualify (DNPQ)
Black	Disqualified (DSQ)
White	Did not start (DNS)
White	Withdrew (WD)
White	Race cancelled (C)
Blank	Did not practice (DNP)
Blank	Did not arrive (DNA)
Blank	Excluded (EX)

**Bold** – Pole
Italics – Fastest Lap

* Tommy Rustad was given a 30 seconds time penalty for an incident in the start, dropping him from 7th to 14th place.

^{♯} Robert Dahlgren was docked 10 points in the drivers' championship, due to being deemed responsible for a crash with Thed Björk. Note that this penalty didn't affect the team score.

=== Team championship ===
The team championship was won by Polestar Racing, a single point ahead of West Coast Racing.

Pos	Team	Pts	Prize money
1	Polestar Racing	156	300.000 SEK
2	West Coast Racing	155	400.000 SEK
3	Flash Engineering	148	100.000 SEK
4	MA:GP / IPS	104	200.000 SEK
5	CMS / NFA	60	
6	Engström Motorsport	50	
7	Biogas.se	23	

=== Semcon Cup ===
The results in the 2009 Semcon Cup were as follows:

Pos.	Driver	MAN (Sweden)		KAR (Sweden)		GÖT (Sweden)		KNU (Sweden)		FAL (Sweden)		KAR (Sweden)		VÅL (Norway)		KNU (Sweden)		MAN (Sweden)		Pts
1	(Sweden) Viktor Hallrup	2	2	3	1	2	1	2	2	3	3	4	2	1	3	1	Ret	2	2	133
2	(Sweden) Johan Kristoffersson	1	1	1	2	Ret	DNS	4	4	1	2	2	3	Ret	6	Ret	2	1	1	111
3	(Sweden) Dick Sahlén	5	5	2	5	3	2	1	1	6	5	Ret	1	2	1	Ret	3	3	4	106
4	(Sweden) Viktor Huggare	3	3	4	4	4	4	3	Ret	5	6	6	4	3	2	3	4	Ret	5	82
5	(Sweden) Mikael Ohlsson	4	4	6	DNS	Ret	Ret	6	3	4	4					2	1			50
6	(Sweden) Claes Hoffsten	Ret	DNS	5	3	Ret	DNS	5	5	7	7	3	5	4	4	Ret	DNS	DNS	DNS	42
7	(Sweden) Andreas Simonsen					1	3			2	1									34
8	(Sweden) Ronnie Brandt					DNS	DNS	DNS	DNS			5	Ret	5	5			DNS	DNS	12
9	(Sweden) Tobias Tegelby																	4	3	11
10	(Sweden) Tony Johansson	DNS	DNS	DNS	DNS	Ret	Ret			8	Ret	1	Ret							11

Colour	Result
Gold	Winner
Silver	Second place
Bronze	Third place
Green	Points classification
Blue	Non-points classification
Blue	Non-classified finish (NC)
Purple	Retired, not classified (Ret)
Red	Did not qualify (DNQ)
Red	Did not pre-qualify (DNPQ)
Black	Disqualified (DSQ)
White	Did not start (DNS)
White	Withdrew (WD)
White	Race cancelled (C)
Blank	Did not practice (DNP)
Blank	Did not arrive (DNA)
Blank	Excluded (EX)
