= 2010 Swedish Touring Car Championship =

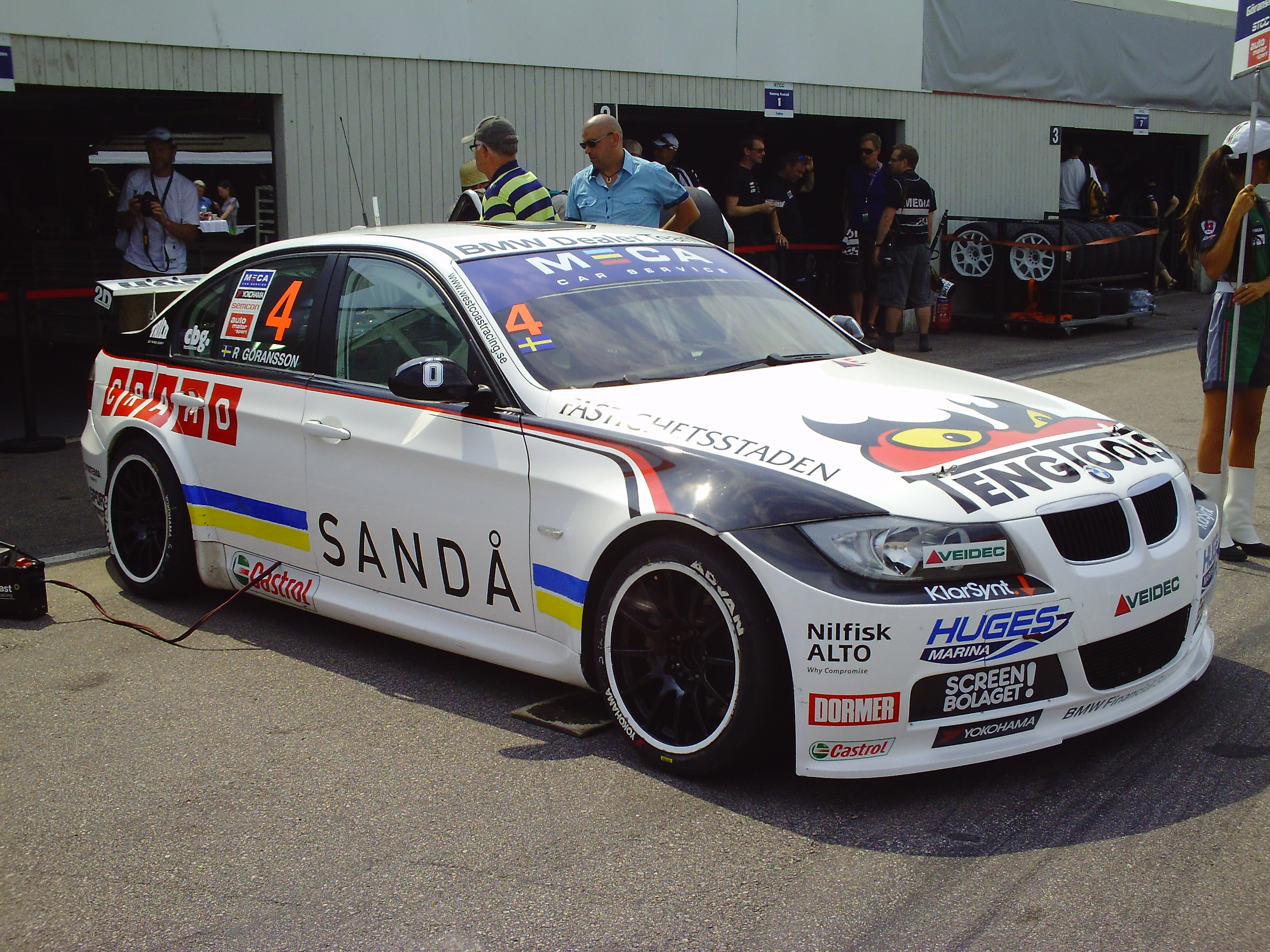
Richard Göransson won the championship, defeating Robert Dahlgren by two points, having trailed Dahlgren into the final race.

The 2010 Swedish Touring Car Championship season was the 15th and last Swedish Touring Car Championship (STCC) season. Four of the race weekends were held together with the Danish Touring Car Championship and the results from these races also counted towards the Scandinavian Touring Car Cup. From 2011, the new Scandinavian Touring Car Championship replaced both the Swedish and the Danish Touring Car Championships.

== Teams and drivers ==
The official entry list for the 2010 STCC season was released on March 20. All teams were Swedish-registered.

Team	Car	No.	Drivers	Class	Rounds
Polestar Racing	Volvo C30	1	(Norway) Tommy Rustad	D	All
Polestar Racing	Volvo C30	7	(Sweden) Robert Dahlgren	D	All
Flash Engineering	BMW 320si	2	(Sweden) Thed Björk	D	All
Flash Engineering	BMW 320si	6	(Sweden) Jan Nilsson	D	All
Flash Engineering	BMW 320si	92	(Sweden) Tobias Tegelby	S	11–12, 15–18
WestCoast Racing	BMW 320si	4	(Sweden) Richard Göransson	D	All
Mattias Ekström Juniorteam	SEAT León	10	(Sweden) Roger Eriksson	D	All
Mattias Ekström Juniorteam	SEAT León	29	(Sweden) Dick Sahlén	D	All
Team Biogas.se	Volkswagen Scirocco	14	(Sweden) Fredrik Ekblom	D	All
Team Biogas.se	Volkswagen Scirocco	15	(Sweden) Patrik Olsson	D	All
Team Biogas.se	Volkswagen Scirocco	41	(Sweden) Johan Kristoffersson	D	15–18
Chevrolet Motorsport Sweden	Chevrolet Cruze	17	(Sweden) Viktor Hallrup	D	1–4, 7–18
Huggare Racing	Opel Astra	18	(Sweden) Viktor Huggare	D	3–18
MA:GP/IPS/Bilsport & MC	Alfa Romeo 156	20	(Sweden) Mattias Andersson	D	All
MA:GP/IPS/Bilsport & MC	BMW 320si	21	(Sweden) Johan Stureson	D	All
Appelqvist Racing	Alfa Romeo 156 GTA	88	(Sweden) Robin Appelqvist	S	1–6, 9–12, 17–18
MECA	Alfa Romeo 156	89	(Sweden) Claes Hoffsten	S	1–6, 9–12, 15–18
G-REX Sweden	Mercedes-Benz C200	91	(Sweden) Tony Johansson	S	15–18
Ebbeson Motorsport	BMW 320si	96	(Sweden) Andreas Ebbeson	S	1–12, 15–18
BMS Event	BMW 320i	97	(Sweden) Joakim Ahlberg	S	3–18
Mälarpower Motorsport	Volvo S60	99	(Sweden) Ronnie Brandt	S	9–10

Icon	Class
D	Drivers' Championship
S	Semcon Cup

== Race calendar ==
The calendar for the 2010 season was published in November 2009. As a first step towards the planned merger with the Danish Touring Car Championship, four of the races will be held together with DTC.

Round	Circuit	Date
1–2	(Denmark) Jyllandsringen *	25 April
3–4	(Sweden) Ring Knutstorp	8 May
5–6	(Sweden) Karlskoga Motorstadion	22 May
7–8	(Sweden) Göteborg City Race *	5 June
9–10	(Sweden) Falkenbergs Motorbana	10 July
11–12	(Sweden) Karlskoga Motorstadion	14 August
13–14	(Denmark) Jyllandsringen *	5 September
15–16	(Sweden) Ring Knutstorp *	18 September
17–18	(Sweden) Mantorp Park	2 October

*Joint STCC and DTC races.

== Results and standings ==
The points system used for both the main championship and Semcon Cup is the new FIA system of 25-18-15-12-10-8-6-4-2-1, awarded to the top ten finishers of each race. In case of ties in points, the championship positions are determined by the classification in the latest race.

=== Races ===
Round	Circuit/Location	Pole position	Fastest lap	Winning driver	Winning team	Highest Scoring Team	Winning privateer
1	(Denmark) Jyllandsringen*	(Norway) Tommy Rustad	(Norway) Tommy Rustad	(Norway) Tommy Rustad	Polestar Racing	Polestar Racing	(Sweden) Andreas Ebbeson
2	(Denmark) Jyllandsringen*	(Sweden) Fredrik Ekblom	(Sweden) Robert Dahlgren	(Sweden) Robert Dahlgren	Polestar Racing	Polestar Racing	(Sweden) Andreas Ebbeson
3	(Sweden) Ring Knutstorp	(Sweden) Thed Björk	(Sweden) Richard Göransson	(Sweden) Richard Göransson	WestCoast Racing	Team Biogas.se	(Sweden) Claes Hoffsten
4	(Sweden) Ring Knutstorp	(Sweden) Mattias Andersson	(Sweden) Robert Dahlgren	(Sweden) Mattias Andersson	MA:GP	Team Biogas.se	(Sweden) Claes Hoffsten
5	(Sweden) Karlskoga Motorstadion	(Sweden) Fredrik Ekblom	(Sweden) Fredrik Ekblom	(Sweden) Fredrik Ekblom	Team Biogas.se	Flash Engineering	(Sweden) Claes Hoffsten
6	(Sweden) Karlskoga Motorstadion	(Sweden) Dick Sahlén	(Sweden) Jan Nilsson	(Sweden) Jan Nilsson	Flash Engineering	Flash Engineering	(Sweden) Andreas Ebbeson
7	(Sweden) Göteborg City Race*	(Sweden) Robert Dahlgren	(Sweden) Robert Dahlgren	(Sweden) Robert Dahlgren	Polestar Racing	Team Biogas.se	(Sweden) Andreas Ebbeson
8	(Sweden) Göteborg City Race*	(Sweden) Patrik Olsson	(Sweden) Richard Göransson	(Sweden) Richard Göransson	WestCoast Racing	Team Biogas.se	(Sweden) Andreas Ebbeson
9	(Sweden) Falkenbergs Motorbana	(Sweden) Robert Dahlgren	(Sweden) Robert Dahlgren	(Sweden) Robert Dahlgren	Polestar Racing	Polestar Racing	(Sweden) Joakim Ahlberg
10	(Sweden) Falkenbergs Motorbana	(Norway) Tommy Rustad	(Sweden) Thed Björk	(Norway) Tommy Rustad	Polestar Racing	Polestar Racing	(Sweden) Andreas Ebbeson
11	(Sweden) Karlskoga Motorstadion	(Sweden) Fredrik Ekblom	(Sweden) Patrik Olsson	(Sweden) Fredrik Ekblom	Team Biogas.se	Team Biogas.se	(Sweden) Andreas Ebbeson
12	(Sweden) Karlskoga Motorstadion	(Sweden) Dick Sahlén	(Sweden) Jan Nilsson	(Sweden) Dick Sahlén	Mattias Ekström Juniorteam	Team Biogas.se	(Sweden) Andreas Ebbeson
13	(Denmark) Jyllandsringen*	(Sweden) Robert Dahlgren	(Sweden) Thed Björk	(Sweden) Richard Göransson	WestCoast Racing	Polestar Racing	(Sweden) Joakim Ahlberg
14	(Denmark) Jyllandsringen*	(Sweden) Thed Björk	(Sweden) Thed Björk	(Sweden) Thed Björk	Flash Engineering	Polestar Racing	(Sweden) Joakim Ahlberg
15	(Sweden) Ring Knutstorp*	(Sweden) Fredrik Ekblom	(Sweden) Fredrik Ekblom	(Sweden) Fredrik Ekblom	Team Biogas.se	Team Biogas.se	(Sweden) Tobias Tegelby
16	(Sweden) Ring Knutstorp*	(Sweden) Patrik Olsson	(Sweden) Richard Göransson	(Sweden) Thed Björk	Flash Engineering	Team Biogas.se	(Sweden) Andreas Ebbeson
17	(Sweden) Mantorp Park	(Sweden) Mattias Andersson	(Sweden) Thed Björk	(Sweden) Mattias Andersson	MA:GP	Polestar Racing	(Sweden) Andreas Ebbeson
18	(Sweden) Mantorp Park	(Sweden) Jan Nilsson	(Norway) Tommy Rustad	(Norway) Tommy Rustad	Polestar Racing	Polestar Racing	(Sweden) Tobias Tegelby

* In the joint STCC and DTC races, only the highest placed STCC driver/team is listed.

=== Drivers championship ===
Pos.	Driver	JYL (Denmark)		KNU (Sweden)		KAR (Sweden)		GÖT (Sweden)		FAL (Sweden)		KAR (Sweden)		JYL (Denmark)		KNU (Sweden)		MAN (Sweden)		Pts
1	(Sweden) Richard Göransson	2	7	1	3	6	3	5	1	3	2	5	4	1	2	11	8	4	3	251
2	(Sweden) Robert Dahlgren	3	1	2	2	2	8	**1**	5	**1**	Ret	4	Ret	**2**	3	2	6	2	9	249
3	(Sweden) Fredrik Ekblom	5	**9**	4	5	**1**	6	3	3	4	4	**1**	5	5	5	**1**	5	3	8	230
4	(Sweden) Mattias Andersson	11	5	8	**1**	4	5	2	Ret	6	6	6	2	6	Ret	4	3	**1**	Ret	181
5	(Sweden) Thed Björk	8	4	**10**	4	15†	4	DNS	13†	2	5	3	3	4	**1**	6	1	13	5	179
6	(Sweden) Patrik Olsson	9	3	3	7	5	7	8	**2**	14†	8	2	6	9	6	7	**2**	5	6	162
7	(Norway) Tommy Rustad	**1**	Ret	Ret	DNS	9	10	9	11	8	**1**	10	9	3	4	3	7	6	1	143
8	(Sweden) Dick Sahlén	7	6	5	8	8	**2**	4	4	5	3	8	**1**	10	10	9	10	Ret	DNS	133
9	(Sweden) Jan "Flash" Nilsson	10	Ret	12	10	3	1	Ret	8	Ret	7	Ret	10	8	Ret	Ret	15†	8	**4**	73
10	(Sweden) Johan Stureson	4	2	DNS	6	7	9	Ret	7	9	9	9	8	Ret	12†	8	9	11	10	69
11	(Sweden) Viktor Hallrup	13	10	6	9			7	6	7	Ret	7	Ret	Ret	7	Ret	14	7	2	67
12	(Sweden) Roger Eriksson	6	8	7	Ret	10	12	Ret	9	10	Ret	11	7	7	11	5	4	10	7	63
13	(Sweden) Andreas Ebbesson	12	11	13	Ret	13	11	8	10	Ret	10	12	11			15	11	9	DNS	8
14	(Sweden) Joakim Ahlberg			11	12	14	13	10	12	12	11†	14	14	12	8	DNS	Ret	14	13	5
15	(Sweden) Johan Kristoffersson													11	9	10	13	15	11	3
16	(Sweden) Claes Hoffsten			9	11	12	14			Ret	Ret	Ret	DNS			12	14	DNS	DNS	2
17	(Sweden) Viktor Huggare			DNS	DNS	11	15†	DNS	DNS	11	Ret	13	12			13	DNS	Ret	DNS	0
18	(Sweden) Tobias Tegelby											15	13			12	16†	12	12	0
19	(Sweden) Robin Appelqvist	14	12	Ret	DNS	Ret	16†			13	Ret	DNS	DNS					Ret	Ret	0
	(Sweden) Tony Johansson															Ret	Ret	Ret	DNS	0
	(Sweden) Ronnie Brandt									Ret	DNS									0
Pos.	Driver	JYL (Denmark)		KNU (Sweden)		KAR (Sweden)		GÖT (Sweden)		FAL (Sweden)		KAR (Sweden)		JYL (Denmark)		KNU (Sweden)		MAN (Sweden)		Pts

Colour	Result
Gold	Winner
Silver	Second place
Bronze	Third place
Green	Points classification
Blue	Non-points classification
Blue	Non-classified finish (NC)
Purple	Retired, not classified (Ret)
Red	Did not qualify (DNQ)
Red	Did not pre-qualify (DNPQ)
Black	Disqualified (DSQ)
White	Did not start (DNS)
White	Withdrew (WD)
White	Race cancelled (C)
Blank	Did not practice (DNP)
Blank	Did not arrive (DNA)
Blank	Excluded (EX)

**Bold** – Pole
Italics – Fastest Lap

† — Drivers did not finish the race, but were classified as they completed over 90% of the race distance.

=== Teams championship ===
Pos	Team	Pts	Prize money
1	Polestar Racing	395	400.000 SEK
2	Team Biogas.se	392	400.000 SEK
3	Flash Engineering	254	100.000 SEK
4	WestCoast Racing	252	
5	MA:GP / IPS	252	
6	Mattias Ekström Junior Team	204	
7	Chevrolet Motorsport Sweden	67	
8	Huggare Racing	0	
