= 2007 Swedish Touring Car Championship =

Seasons
- ← 2006 2008 →

The 2007 Swedish Touring Car Championship season was the 12th Swedish Touring Car Championship (STCC) season. The championship was won by Fredrik Ekblom, becoming the first ever three-times STCC champion.

== Teams and drivers ==
These were the entries for the 2007 Season.

Team	Car	No.	Drivers	Rounds
Drivers' Championship
Kristoffersson Motorsport	Audi A4	1	(Sweden) Thed Björk	All
Kristoffersson Motorsport	Audi A4	10	(Sweden) Tommy Kristoffersson	All
Kristoffersson Motorsport	Audi A4	55	(Germany) Frank Stippler	All
Flash Engineering	BMW 320si E90 Ethanol	2	(Sweden) Richard Göransson	All
Flash Engineering	BMW 320si E90 Ethanol	9	(Sweden) Jan Nilsson	All
WestCoast Racing	BMW 320si E90	3	(Sweden) Robin Rudholm	All
WestCoast Racing	BMW 320si E90	4	(Sweden) Fredrik Ekblom	All
Engström Motorsport	Honda Accord	5	(Sweden) Tomas Engström	All
Polestar Racing	Volvo S60 Ethanol	6	(Sweden) Robert Dahlgren	All
Polestar Racing	Volvo S60 Ethanol	7	(Sweden) Alexander Storckenfeldt	All
Opel Team Sweden	Opel Astra GTC 2000	8	(Norway) Tommy Rustad	All
Picko Troberg Racing	BMW 320i	11	(Sweden) Roger Eriksson	All
Picko Troberg Racing	BMW 320i	22	(Sweden) Fredrik Lestrup	All
Crawford Racing	BMW 320si E90	12	(Sweden) Carl Rosenblad	1
PWR Racing Team	Mercedes-Benz C200	14	(Sweden) Hans Simonsson	All
Mercedes-Benz Sport	Mercedes-Benz C200	15	(Sweden) Tobias Johansson	All
Chevrolet Motorsport Sweden	Chevrolet Lacetti	16	(Sweden) Nickas Karlsson	5, 8, 11
Artman Racing	Honda Accord Euro-R	17	(Russia) Andrey Smetsky	1
MA:GP	Alfa Romeo 156	20	(Sweden) Mattias Andersson	All
IPS Motorsport	Peugeot 407	21	(Sweden) Johan Stureson	All
Team CaWalli	BMW 320i	44	(Sweden) David Björk	All
STCC Challenge
Huggare Racing	BMW 320i	96	(Sweden) Viktor Huggare	2–5, 7–8, 11
Tysslinge Racing	BMW 320i	97	(Sweden) Tobias Tegelby	All
Team Euromaster	Opel Astra Coupe	98	(Sweden) Joakim Fridh	1–5, 7–11
Mälarpower Motorsport	Volvo S60	99	(Sweden) Ronnie Brandt	1, 4, 6–11

== Race calendar ==
Round	Circuit	Date	Pole position	Fastest lap	Winning driver	Winning team
1	(Sweden) Sturup Raceway	22 April	(Sweden) Robert Dahlgren	(Sweden) Jan Nilsson	(Sweden) Robert Dahlgren	Polestar Racing
2	(Sweden) Ring Knutstorp	6 May	(Sweden) Robert Dahlgren	(Sweden) Robin Rudholm	(Sweden) Robert Dahlgren	Polestar Racing
3	(Sweden) Mantorp Park	20 May	(Germany) Frank Stippler	(Sweden) Richard Göransson	(Sweden) Richard Göransson	Flash Engineering
4	(Sweden) Karlskoga Motorstadion	3 June	(Sweden) Fredrik Ekblom	(Sweden) Richard Göransson	(Sweden) Fredrik Ekblom	WestCoast Racing
5	(Sweden) Anderstorp	17 June	(Sweden) Robin Rudholm	(Sweden) Fredrik Ekblom	(Sweden) Robin Rudholm	WestCoast Racing
6	(Norway) Vålerbanen	30 June	(Sweden) Robert Dahlgren	(Sweden) Richard Göransson	(Sweden) Richard Göransson	Flash Engineering
7	(Sweden) Falkenbergs Motorbana	15 July	(Sweden) Thed Björk	(Sweden) Fredrik Ekblom	(Sweden) Thed Björk	Kristoffersson Motorsport
8	(Sweden) Karlskoga Motorstadion	19 August	(Sweden) Tomas Engström	(Sweden) Robin Rudholm	(Sweden) Richard Göransson	Flash Engineering
9	(Sweden) Ring Knutstorp	2 September	(Sweden) Robert Dahlgren	(Sweden) Robin Rudholm	(Sweden) Alexander Storckenfeldt	Polestar Racing
10	(Sweden) Sturup Raceway	16 September	(Sweden) Johan Stureson	(Sweden) Johan Stureson	(Sweden) Fredrik Ekblom	WestCoast Racing
11	(Sweden) Mantorp Park	30 September	(Sweden) Jan Nilsson	(Norway) Tommy Rustad	(Norway) Tommy Rustad	Opel Team Sweden

== Championship standings ==
=== Drivers ===
Pos	Driver	STU (Sweden)	KNU (Sweden)	MAN (Sweden)	KAR (Sweden)	AND (Sweden)	VÅL (Norway)	FAL (Sweden)	KAR (Sweden)	KNU (Sweden)	STU (Sweden)	MAN (Sweden)	Pts
1	(Sweden) Fredrik Ekblom	12	3	2	1	4	5	2	2	6	1	Ret	62
2	(Sweden) Robert Dahlgren	1	1	7	Ret	5	3	6	5	2	5	Ret	51
3	(Sweden) Richard Göransson	DNS	Ret	1	4	7	1	3	1	9	4	Ret	48
4	(Sweden) Thed Björk	7	Ret	3	3	3	15	1	4	4	Ret	8	41
5	(Sweden) Jan Nilsson	2	5	Ret	5	2	Ret	4	Ret	7	10	6	34
6	(Sweden) Robin Rudholm	DNS	2	4	Ret	1	Ret	Ret	3	8	6	Ret	33
7	(Germany) Frank Stippler	5	Ret	6	Ret	Ret	2	5	8	10	2	7	30
8	(Sweden) Alexander Storckenfeldt	10	4	Ret	Ret	11	4	DNS	11	1	12	11	20
9	(Sweden) Johan Stureson	3	6	Ret	14	Ret	Ret	Ret	Ret	Ret	3	3	19
10	(Sweden) Mattias Andersson	13	9	5	6	Ret	6	Ret	6	3	Ret	10	19
11	(Norway) Tommy Rustad	9	Ret	Ret	12	6	Ret	Ret	9	5	9	1	17
12	(Sweden) Tomas Engström	4	7	8	2	9	10	12	Ret	DNS	Ret	Ret	16
13	(Sweden) David Björk	8	10	Ret	7	14	9	Ret	7	Ret	7	2	15
14	(Sweden) Tommy Kristoffersson	6	8	9	10	7	8	8	12	Ret	11	5	12
15	(Sweden) Joakim Fridh	17	15	Ret	13	13		9	18	15	17	4	5
16	(Sweden) Roger Eriksson	14	13	Ret	9	12	7	7	15	14	8	Ret	5
17	(Sweden) Fredrik Lestrup	15	12	Ret	8	Ret	11	Ret	10	13	13	9	1
18	(Sweden) Tobias Tegelby	18	Ret	10	Ret	10	Ret	10	17	12	16	15	0
19	(Sweden) Hans Simonsson	Ret	11	Ret	Ret	15	12	Ret	16	DNS	15	14	0
20	(Sweden) Tobias Johansson	16	14	Ret	11	DNS	13	DNS	14	11	14	13	0
21	(Sweden) Carl Rosenblad	11											0
22	(Sweden) Nicklas Karlsson					DNS		WD	13			16	0
23	(Sweden) Ronnie Brandt	Ret			Ret		14	Ret	20	16	18	17	0
24	(Sweden) Viktor Huggare		16	Ret	Ret	17		Ret	19			12	0
25	(Russia) Andrey Smetsky	19											0

Colour	Result
Gold	Winner
Silver	Second place
Bronze	Third place
Green	Points classification
Blue	Non-points classification
Blue	Non-classified finish (NC)
Purple	Retired, not classified (Ret)
Red	Did not qualify (DNQ)
Red	Did not pre-qualify (DNPQ)
Black	Disqualified (DSQ)
White	Did not start (DNS)
White	Withdrew (WD)
White	Race cancelled (C)
Blank	Did not practice (DNP)
Blank	Did not arrive (DNA)
Blank	Excluded (EX)

STCC Teams Championship
Position	Make	Points
1	Flash Engineering	75
2	WestCoast Racing	72
3	Kristoffersson Motorsport	68
4	Polestar Racing	60
5	MA:GP	29
6	Engström Motorsport	27
7	Team CaWalli	26
8	Opel Team Sweden	24
9	IPS Motorsport	23
10	Picko Troberg Racing	19
11	Mercedes-Benz Sport/PWR Racing Team	3
11	Chevrolet Motorsport Sweden	0

STCC Manufacturers Championship
Position	Make	Points
1	BMW	93
2	Audi	72
3	Volvo	70
4	Alfa Romeo	38
5	Honda	36
6	Opel	34
7	Peugeot	30
8	Mercedes	23
9	Chevrolet	4

Caran Cup
Position	Driver	Points
1	Joakim Fridh	82
2	Tobias Tegelby	74
3	Viktor Huggare	34
4	Ronnie Brandt	32
