= Thomas Schie =

Norwegian racing and rally driver (born 1975)

- Nationality: Norwegian
- Born: 1 December 1975 (age 50) Oslo, Norway

Previous series
- 1999, 2008-2009 1998 1997 1995-1996 1994 1993: Swedish Touring Car Championship; Barber Dodge Pro Series; International Formula 3000; Barber Dodge Pro Series; Formula Opel Lotus; Formula Ford Sweden
Thomas Schie
World Rally Championship record
- Years active: 2002-2007
- Co-driver: (Norway) Ragnar Engen (Sweden) Göran Bergsten
- Rallies: 10
- Rally wins: 0
- Podiums: 0
- Stage wins: 0
- First rally: 2002 Swedish Rally
- Last rally: 2007 Rally Catalunya

Thomas Schie (born 1 December 1975) is a former racing and rally driver. He previously competed in the International Formula 3000, Swedish Touring Car Championship and World Rally Championship.

== Career ==
=== Racing ===
Schie started his autoracing career in the Swedish Formula Ford Junior championship. Schie, as the only foreigner in the championship, finished third. Moving up the ladder Schie moved into the Scandinavian Formula Opel Lotus championship. After he finished seventh in the season, Schie joined Team Norway at the Formula Opel Lotus Nations Cup. At Circuit Park Zandvoort Schie finished eighth with this teammate Tommy Rustad. For the 1995 season, he moved to the United States of America to race in the Barber Dodge Pro Series. After a tough start of the season, in which he had a number of retirements, Schie finished strong. Due to two third-place finishes at the end of the season, Schie finished his inaugural season in the Barber Dodge Pro Series seventh in the standings. The following season was more successful. Schie won both races at Mazda Raceway Laguna Seca. He finished second in the standings second to fellow Scandinavian Fredrik Larsson.

Following his success Shcie returned to Europe to race in the International Formula 3000 for Bob Salisbury Engineering. The team was in their second year of F3000, Schie was joined by Oliver Gavin as his teammate. Gavin was replaced by James Taylor as of round four. All three drivers struggled to qualify for the races. Schie qualified for five out of ten rounds. The first race Schie participated in was the 1997 Pau Grand Prix. Eleven drivers failed to qualify. He finished fourteenth out of 22 drivers. His best result came at Spa where he finished tenth.

After failing to gain enough sponsorship for another F3000 season, Schie returned to the Barber Dodge Pro Series. Since he left the series the original car was replaced by the state-of-the-art Reynard 98E. Schie returned to the series where he left of, as a frontrunner. Schie finished third in the first round at Sebring International Raceway, behind Todd Snyder and Victor Gonzalez, Jr., He won the races at Lime Rock Park and Cleveland. He eventually finished third in the final standings.

Schie focused on his touring car career following his strong Barber Dodge Pro Series season. Schie raced an Alfa Romeo 156 TS in the very competitive Swedish Touring Car Championship. Despite missing a number of races Schie finished eighth in the championship, the first placed Alfa Romeo. His best result was a second place at Mantorp Park. Schie returned to the STCC in 2008 and 2009. He joined Chevrolet Motorsport Sweden achieving a second place in the 2008 Göteborg City Race. In 2009 Schie left the series after the first Göteborg race. Schie claimed that the team did not live up to his professional expectations. Team boss Nicklas Karlsson claims however that Schie did not fulfill his financial obligations.

=== Rally ===
Following the 1999 STCC season, Schie focused on his rally ambitions. After racing in national rallies and in the European Rally Championship, he made his World Rally Championship debut in 2002. He entered a Toyota Corolla WRC in the Swedish Rally. After running in the top-fifty, Schie had to retire from the rally following a broken transmission after special stage nine. Schie won his first international rally in 2003. Schie won the Uno-X Saaremaa Rally near Kuressaare, Estonia. Schie beat Mats Jonsson among other international rally drivers. He won the Norwegian Rally Championship in 2004, 2005 and 2006. He won nine rallies to collect his three titles. Schie made his last WRC outing at the 2007 Rally Catalunya. He scored his best result in a WRC rally finishing twelfth.

=== Current life ===
Currently, Schie is a manager at a workwear retailer and is a Formula One analyst for Viasat. He is also still based in Oslo.

== Racing record ==
=== Complete International Formula 3000 results ===
(key) (Races in bold indicate pole position) (Races in italics indicate fastest lap)

Year	Entrant	1	2	3	4	5	6	7	8	9	10	DC	Points
1997	Bob Salisbury Engineering	SIL; DNQ	PAU; 14	HEL; DNQ	NÜR; DNQ	PER; DNQ	HOC; 15	A1R; DNQ	SPA; 10	MUG; 18	JER; Ret	**29th**	**0**

=== American open–wheel racing results ===
(key) (Races in bold indicate pole position)

==== Partial Barber Dodge Pro Series results ====
Year	1	2	3	4	5	6	7	8	9	10	11	12	Rank	Points
1998	SEB; 3	LRP; 1	DET; 7	WGI; 6	CLE; 1	GRA; 19	**MOH**; 8	ROA; 6	LS1; 23	ATL; 5	HMS; 5	LS2; 26	**3rd**	**114**

=== Complete Swedish Touring Car Championship results ===
(key) (Races in bold indicate pole position) (Races in italics indicate fastest lap)

Year	Team	Car	1	2	3	4	5	6	7	8	9	10	11	12	13	14	15	16	17	18	DC	Pts
1999	Picko Troberg Racing	Alfa Romeo 156 TS	MAN; 1; 8	MAN; 2; 5	KNU; 1; 8	KNU; 2 Ret	KAR; 1 Ret	KAR; 2 DNS	AND; 1; 16	AND; 2 DNS	FAL; 1; 7	FAL; 2 DNS	AND; 1	AND; 2	ARC; 1; 4	ARC; 2; 5	MAN; 1; 2	MAN; 2 DSQ			**8th**	**66**
2008	Chevrolet Motorsport Sweden	Chevrolet Lacetti	KNU; 8	STU; Ret	MAN; 8	KAR; 4	GÖT; 2	STU; 8	FAL; 15	KAR; Ret	KNU; 4	VÅL; 7	MAN; 5								**7th**	**26**
2009	Chevrolet Motorsport Sweden	Chevrolet Lacetti	MAN; 1; 8	MAN; 2; 7	KAR; 1; 9	KAR; 2 Ret	GÖT; 1; 5	GÖT; 2 DNS	KNU; 1	KNU; 2	FAL; 1	FAL; 2	KAR; 1	KAR; 2	VÅL; 1	VÅL; 2	KNU; 1	KNU; 2	MAN; 1	MAN; 2	**14th**	**7**

=== Complete WRC results ===
Year	Entrant	Car	1	2	3	4	5	6	7	8	9	10	11	12	13	14	15	16	WDC	Points
2002	Thomas Schie	Subaru Impreza STi	MON	SWE; Ret	FRA	ESP	CYP	ARG	GRE	KEN	FIN	GER	ITA	NZL	AUS	GBR			NC	0
2003	Thomas Schie	Toyota Corolla WRC	MON	SWE; Ret	TUR	NZL	ARG	GRE	CYP	GER	FIN	AUS	ITA	FRA	ESP	GBR			NC	0
2004	Thomas Schie	Toyota Corolla WRC	MON	SWE; Ret	MEX	NZL	CYP	GRE	TUR	ARG	FIN	GER	JPN	GBR	ITA	FRA	ESP	AUS	NC	0
2005	Thomas Schie	Ford Focus RS WRC '02	MON	SWE; Ret	MEX	NZL	ITA	CYP	TUR	GRE	ARG	FIN	GER	GBR	JPN	FRA	ESP	AUS	NC	0
2006	Thomas Schie	Ford Focus RS WRC '04	MON	SWE; Ret	MEX	ESP	FRA	ARG	ITA	GRE	GER	FIN; Ret	JPN	CYP	TUR	AUS	NZL	GBR	NC	0
2007	Thomas Schie	Ford Focus RS WRC '04	MON	SWE; 14	NOR; Ret	MEX	POR	ARG	ITA	GRE	FIN	GER; Ret	NZL	ESP; 12	FRA	JPN	IRE	GBR	NC	0

=== Czech Rally Championship results ===
Year	Entrant	Car	1	2	3	4	5	6	7	8	9	MMČR	Points
2003	Thomas Schie	Toyota Corolla WRC	ŠUM	VAL	KRU	BOH; Ret	BAR	PŘÍ	TŘE			**NC**	**0**
2004	Thomas Schie	Toyota Corolla WRC	JÄN	ŠUM	TAT	KRU	BOH; 4	BAR	PŘÍ	TŘE		**NC**	**0**
2005	Thomas Schie	Toyota Corolla WRC	JÄN	ŠUM	VAL	TAT	KRU	BOH; Ret	BAR	PŘÍ	TŘE	**NC**	**0**

Sporting positions
Preceded by Henning Solberg	Norwegian Rally Champion; 2004-2006	Succeeded by Mads Østberg
