= Thed Björk =

Swedish racing driver (born 1980)

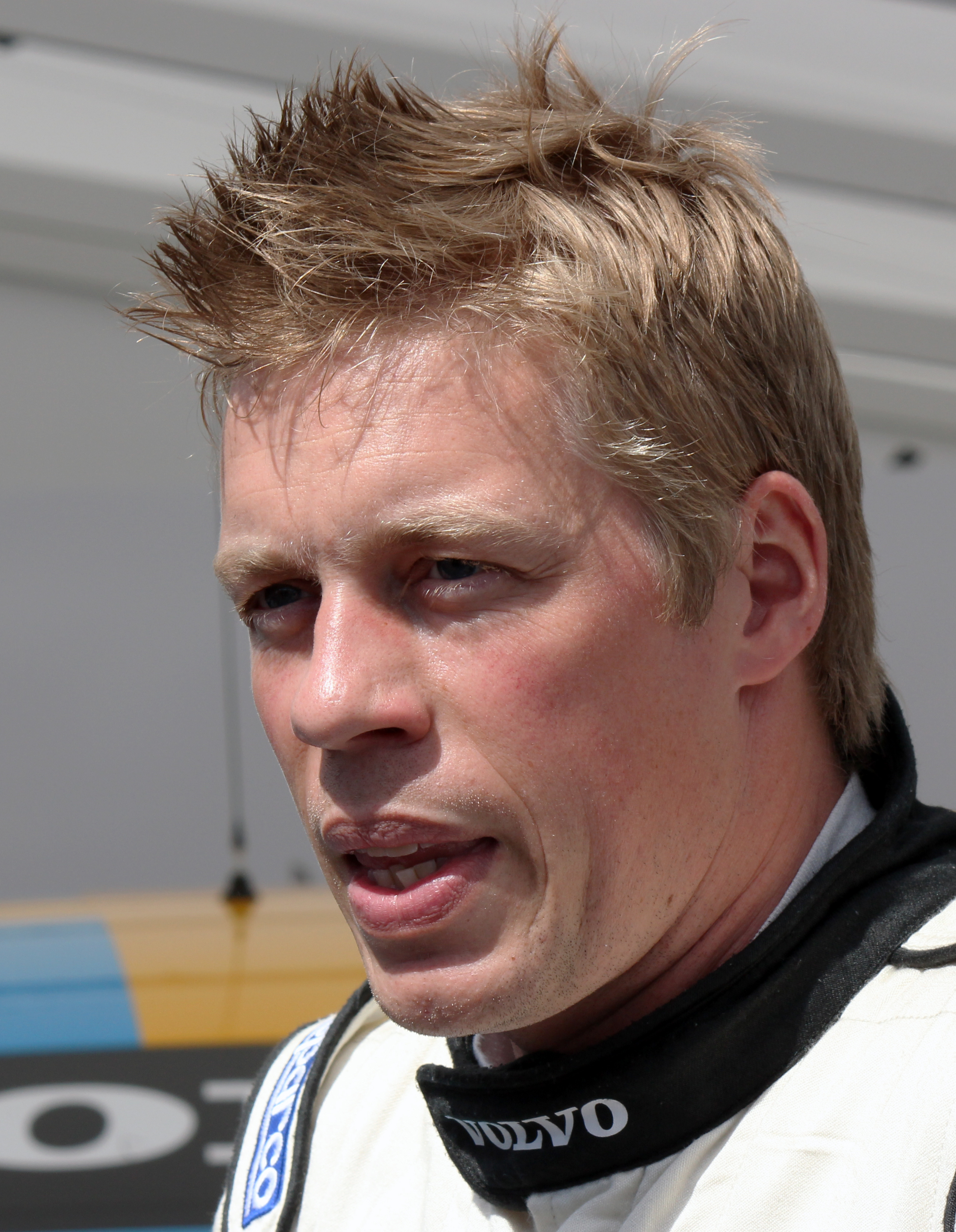
- Björk in 2012
- Nationality: Swedish
- Born: Thed Björk Bang-Melchior; 14 December 1980 (age 45) Hallsberg, Sweden

World Touring Car Championship and World Touring Car Cup career
- Debut season: 2013
- Current team: Cyan Racing
- Car number: 11
- Starts: 43
- Wins: 3
- Poles: 1
- Fastest laps: 5
- Best finish: 1st in 2017

Previous series
- 2013–2015 2012 2011 2006 2005 2003 2002 2001, 2004–2010 2001, 2003 2001 2001 2000 1999 1999: STCC; TTA; Camaro Cup; DTM; ETCC; Formula Renault V6 Eurocup; International Formula 3000; STCC (Sweden); Swedish GT Series; FIA Sportscar Championship; French Formula Three; Barber Dodge Pro Series; Swedish Formula Three; Nordic Formula Three

Championship titles
- 2017 2013–2015 2011 2006 2003 2001 1999 1999: WTCC; STCC; Camaro Cup; STCC (Sweden); Swedish GT Series; FIA Sportscar Championship; Swedish Formula Three; Nordic Formula Three

Awards
- 2017: World Champion

Thed Björk Bang-Melchior (born 14 December 1980) is a Swedish racing driver, and 2017 World Touring Car Champion. Other notable titles include the 2006 Swedish Touring Car Championship and the 2013, 2014 and 2015 Scandinavian Touring Car Championship. He also finished second in 2005 and 2009, and third in the 2008 STCC and the 2012 TTA – Racing Elite League.

== Career ==
=== Early career ===
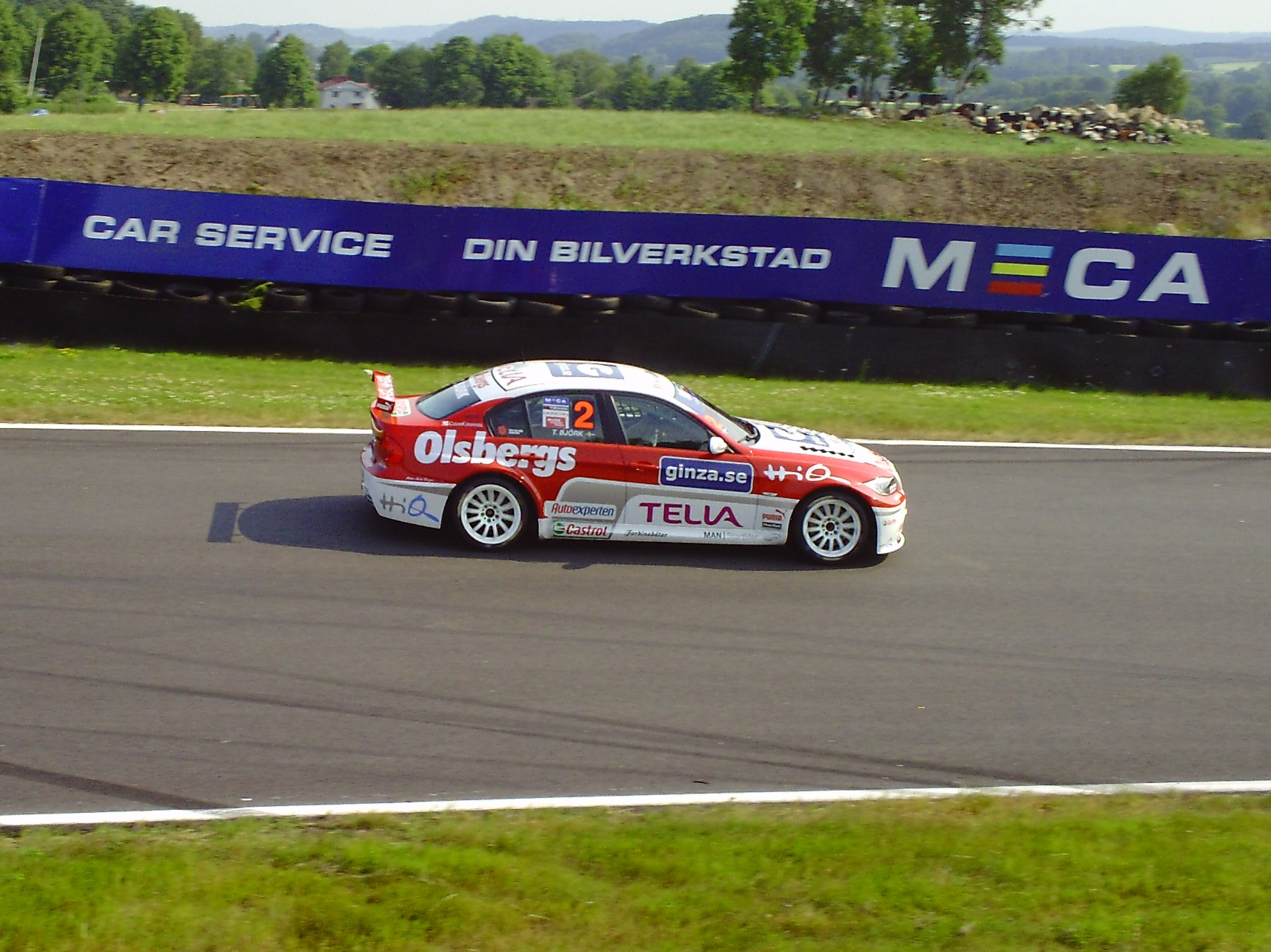
Björk competing in the 2010 Swedish Touring Car Championship.

After graduating from Karting in 1997, Björk raced in the Swedish and Nordic Formula 3 series, taking both titles in 1999. For 2000, he went to the United States to race in the Barber Dodge Pro Series. Björk took one pole position, lap record at Mid-Ohio and two fastest race laps. His best race finish was a fourth place and had he had one fifth and three sixth places. Björk finished tenth overall.

2001 saw Björk race in several different series; concentrating on the FIA Sportscar Championship SR2 class for Sportscar Racing Team Sweden, taking the title together with American Larry Oberto. Björk finished third in the Swedish GT series, and was on the podium in eleven out of twelve races, and he also made his debut in STCC, filling in for Kristoffersson Motorsport's Roberto Colciago for one weekend. There he showed pace from the start, finishing second in one of the weekend's two races. He also raced in the 24 Hours of Daytona, taking the class pole position and fastest lap but had to retire after gearbox failure while in the lead.

In 2002, Björk raced in the Formula 3000 series for team Nordic but did not score any points and finished 15th overall and 12th in the LMP900 class in the 2002 24 Hours of Le Mans racing for Courage Compétition.

Björk returned to Sweden in 2003 for another stint at GTR, this time taking the title in a Chrysler Viper GTS-R, winning all of the races he started in – only a single non-start prevented him from winning every single event. GTR however was disbanded by the end of the year, leaving Björk without a seat for 2004.

When Niklas Lovén and the works STCC BMW team WestCoast Racing parted ways midway through the 2004 season, Björk was called in to replace him. He took two podium finishes and ended up 11th overall. He stayed with the team for 2005, winning two races, was on the podium in six out of eight races and finished second overall.

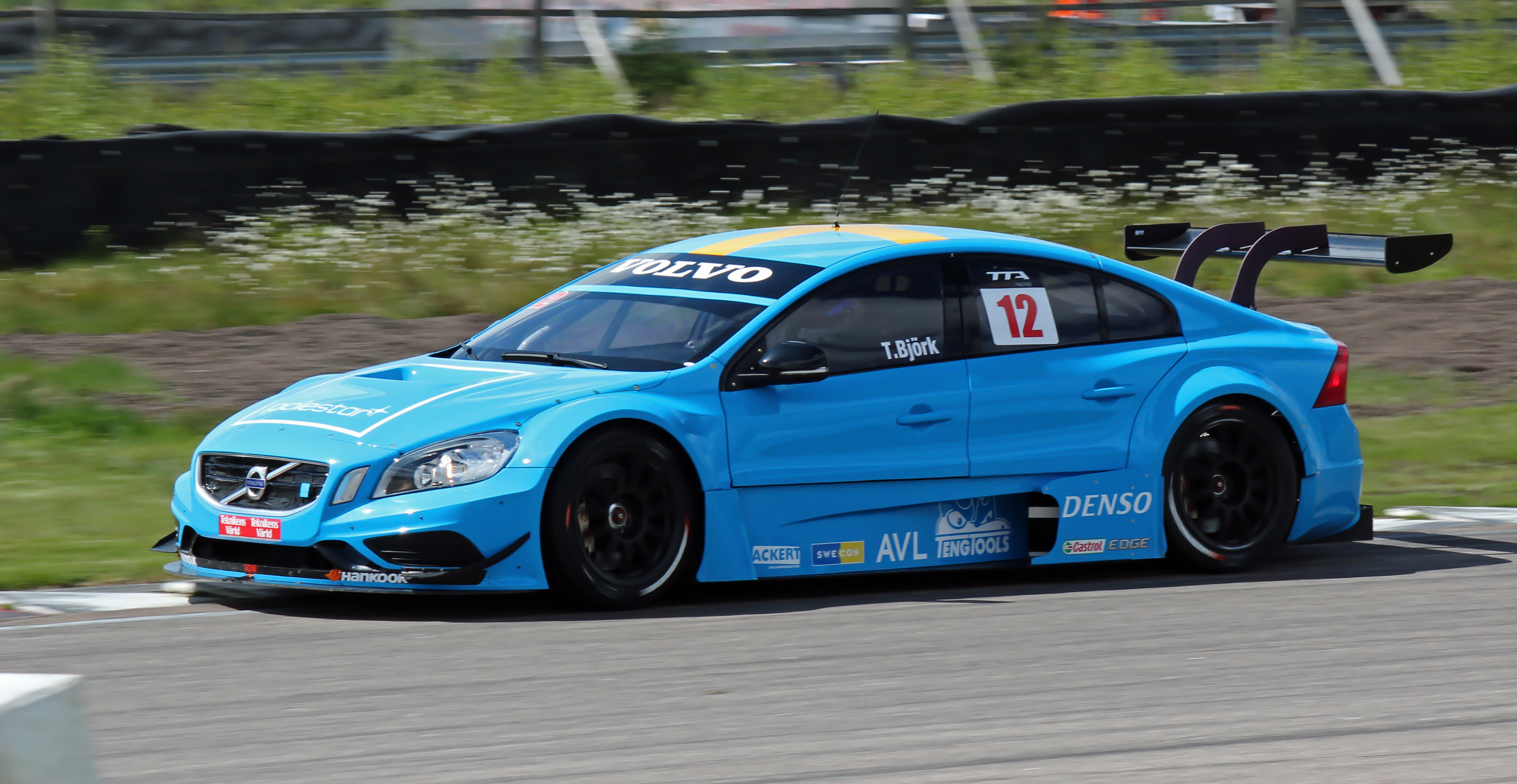
Björk competing in the 2012 TTA-Racing Elite League.

In 2006, Björk signed for the Kristoffersson Motorsport Audi team, the same team that he raced for in 2001. The move proved to be a successful one; Björk took the championship lead with a win in the first race and kept it for the rest of the season, taking the title ahead of his former teammate Richard Göransson. During the season he took three race wins and finished on the podium on six occasions.

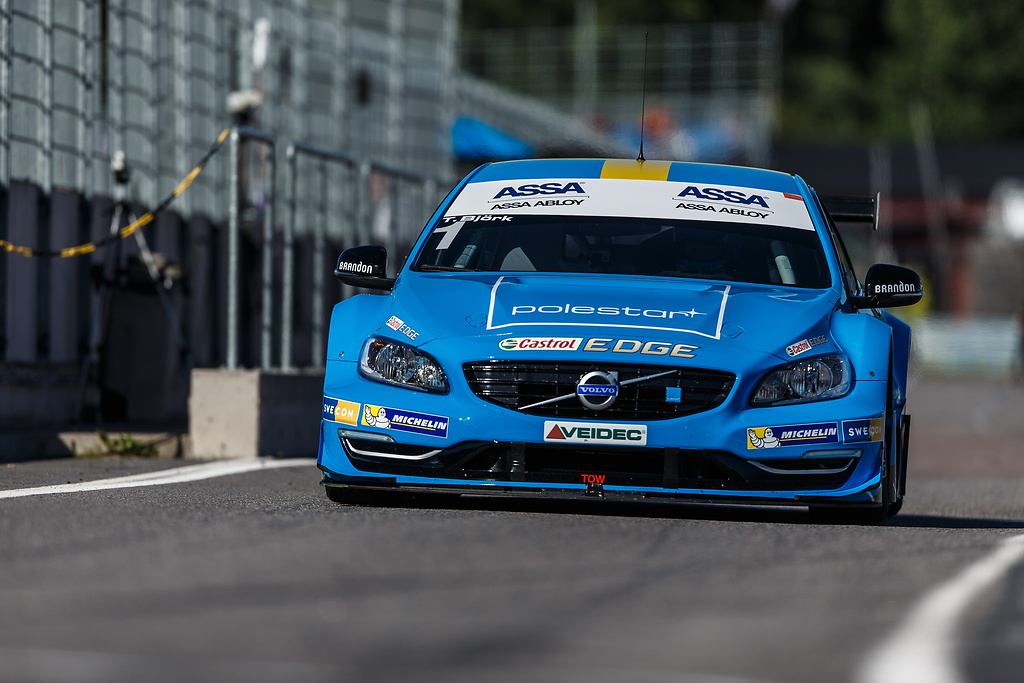
Björk competing in the 2015 Scandinavian Touring Car Championship.

=== DTM ===
When the Futurecom TME Audi DTM driver Nicolas Kiesa injured his leg in a motocross accident with two races remaining, Björk was called in as a replacement. In an outdated 2004 car, he was third on the first free practice – his first run in the car – but then returned to where the older cars were usually seen, further down the field. He was rumored to drive for Audi for the 2007 season, but missed out on a drive.

== Racing record ==
=== American Open-Wheel racing results ===
(key) (Races in bold indicate pole position, races in italics indicate fastest race lap)

==== Barber Dodge Pro Series ====
Year	1	2	3	4	5	6	7	8	9	10	11	12	Rank	Points
2000	SEB; 10	MIA; 5	NAZ; 23	LRP; 12	DET; 10	CLE; 4	**MOH**; 11	ROA; 6	VAN; 6	LAG; 8	RAT; 6	HMS; 19	**10th**	**83**

=== 24 Hours of Le Mans results ===
Year	Team	Co-Drivers	Car	Class	Laps	Pos.	Class Pos.
2002	(France) Courage Compétition	(France) Didier Cottaz (France) Boris Derichebourg	Courage C60-Judd	LMP900	322	15th	11th

=== Complete International Formula 3000 results ===
(key) (Races in bold indicate pole position) (Races in italics indicate fastest lap)

Year	Entrant	1	2	3	4	5	6	7	8	9	10	11	12	DC	Points
2002	Coca-Cola Nordic Racing	INT	IMO	CAT	A1R	MON	NUR	SIL	MAG; Ret	HOC; 7	HUN; 13	SPA; 8	MNZ; 7	16th	0

=== Complete Deutsche Tourenwagen Masters results ===
(key)

Year	Team	Car	1	2	3	4	5	6	7	8	9	10	Pos	Points
2006	Futurecom TME	Audi A4 DTM 2004	HOC	LAU	OSC	BRH	NOR	NÜR	ZAN	CAT	BUG; 14	HOC; 15†	22nd	0

^{†} Driver did not finish, but completed 90% of race distance.

=== Complete Swedish Touring Car Championship results ===
(key) (Races in bold indicate pole position) (Races in italics indicate fastest lap)

Year	Team	Car	1	2	3	4	5	6	7	8	9	10	11	12	13	14	15	16	17	18	19	20	DC	Points
2001	Kristoffersson Motorsport	Audi A4 Quattro	FAL; 1	FAL; 2	MAN; 1 Ret	MAN; 2; 2	KAR; 1	KAR; 2	JYL; 1	JYL; 2	FAL; 1	FAL; 2	KNU; 1	KNU; 2	MOI; 1	MOI; 2							18th	12
2001	Euroracing	Alfa Romeo 156															KAR; 1 Ret	KAR; 2; 15	KNU; 1	KNU; 2	MAN; 1	MAN; 2	18th	12
2004	West Coast Racing	BMW 320i	KNU; 1	KNU; 2	FAL; 1	FAL; 2	KAR; 1	KAR; 2	MAN; 1	MAN; 2	FAL; 1	FAL; 2	KNU; 1 Ret	KNU; 2; 14	ARC; 1	ARC; 2	KAR; 1; 4	KAR; 2; 3	MAN; 1; 3	MAN; 2; 4			11th	48
2005	West Coast Racing	BMW 320i	KNU; 1	KAR; 3	AND; 3	FAL; 6	KNU; DNS	KAR; 1	VAL; 2	MAN; 3													2nd	141
2006	Kristoffersson Motorsport	Audi A4	KNU; 1	KAR; 3	MAN; 7	FAL; 1	VAL; 2	AND; 16	KAR; 1	KNU; 2	MAN; 4												1st	59
2007	Kristoffersson Motorsport	Audi A4	STU; 7	KNU; Ret	MAN; 3	KAR; 3	AND; 3	VAL; 15	FAL; 1	KAR; 4	KNU; 4	STU; Ret	MAN; 8										4th	41
2008	Honda Racing	Honda Accord Euro R	KNU; 9	STU; 3	MAN; 1	KAR; 6	GÖT; 1	STU; 3	FAL; Ret	KAR; 1	KNU; 7	VAL; 5	MAN; 3										3rd	57
2009	Flash Engineering	BMW 320si E90	MAN; 1; 4	MAN; 2; 2	KAR; 1; 4	KAR; 2; 3	GÖT; 1; 2	GÖT; 2; 4	KNU; 1; 3	KNU; 2 Ret	FAL; 1; 2	FAL; 2; 3	KAR; 1; 4	KAR; 2; 4	VAL; 1; 2	VAL; 2; 3	KNU; 1; 2	KNU; 2; 11	MAN; 1; 4	MAN; 2 Ret			2nd	94
2010	Flash Engineering	BMW 320si E90	JYL; 1; 8	JYL; 2; 4	**KNU**; **1**; 10	KNU; 2; 4	KAR; 1; 15†	KAR; 2; 4	GÖT; 1 DNS	GÖT; 2; 13†	FAL; 1; 2	FAL; 2; 5	KAR; 1; 3	KAR; 2; 3	JYL; 1; 4	**JYL**; **2**; 1	KNU; 1; 6	KNU; 2; 1	MAN; 1; 13	MAN; 2; 5			5th	179

^{†} Driver did not finish the race, but was classified as he completed over 90% of the race distance.

=== Complete Scandinavian Touring Car Championship results ===
(key) (Races in bold indicate pole position) (Races in italics indicate fastest lap)

Year	Team	Car	1	2	3	4	5	6	7	8	9	10	11	12	13	14	15	16	17	18	DC	Points
2011	Biogas.se	Volkswagen Scirocco	JYL; 1	JYL; 2	KNU; 1	KNU; 2	MAN; 1	MAN; 2	GÖT; 1	GÖT; 2	FAL; 1	FAL; 2	KAR; 1	KAR; 2	JYL; 1	JYL; 2	KNU; 1	KNU; 2	MAN; 1; 7	MAN; 2; 7	20th	12
2013	Volvo Polestar Racing	Volvo S60 TTA	KNU; 1; 4	KNU; 2; 1	**SOL**; **1**; 1	GÖT; 1; 1	FAL; 1; 1	FAL; 2; 14†	**ÖST**; **1**; 1	**KAR**; **1**; 1	**KAR**; **2**; 1	**TIE**; **1**; 3	MAN; 1; 4	MAN; 2; 1							**1st**	**258**
2014	Volvo Polestar Racing	Volvo S60 TTA	KNU; 1; 7	KNU; 2; 4	GÖT; 1; 9	**GÖT**; **2**; 1	FAL; 1; 3	FAL; 2; 9	KNU; 1; 4	KNU; 2; 1	SOL; 1; 5	**SOL**; **2**; 1	MAN; 1; 4	**MAN**; **2**; 2							**1st**	**279**
2015	Volvo Polestar Racing	Volvo S60 TTA	**VRS**; **1**; 1	VRS; 2; 1	**AND**; **1**; 1	AND; 2; 4	**MAN**; **1**; 1	MAN; 2; 2	FAL; 1; 3	FAL; 2; 11†	**KAR**; **1**; 1	KAR; 2; 4									**1st**	**366**
2015	Volvo Cyan Racing	Volvo S60 TTA											**SOL**; **1**; 3	SOL; 2; 6	KNU; 1; 3	KNU; 2; 3					**1st**	**366**

^{†} Driver did not finish, but completed 90% of race distance.

=== Complete TTA – Racing Elite League results ===
(key) (Races in bold indicate pole position) (Races in italics indicate fastest lap)

Year	Team	Car	1	2	3	4	5	6	7	8	DC	Points
2012	Volvo Polestar Racing	Volvo S60 TTA	KAR; 1; 4	AND; 1 Ret	GÖT; 1; 1	FAL; 1; 6	KAR; 1; 2	AND; 1; 3	STO; 1; 4	**GÖT**; **1**; 1	**3rd**	**121**

=== Complete World Touring Car Championship results ===
(key) (Races in bold indicate pole position) (Races in italics indicate fastest lap)

Year	Team	Car	1	2	3	4	5	6	7	8	9	10	11	12	13	14	15	16	17	18	19	20	21	22	23	24	Pos	Pts
2013	Volvo Polestar Racing	Volvo C30 DRIVe	ITA; 1	ITA; 2	MAR; 1	MAR; 2	SVK; 1	SVK; 2	HUN; 1	HUN; 2	AUT; 1	AUT; 2	RUS; 1	RUS; 2	POR; 1	POR; 2	ARG; 1	ARG; 2	USA; 1	USA; 2	JPN; 1	JPN; 2	CHN; 1 DNS	CHN; 2; 15	MAC; 1	MAC; 2	NC	0
2016	Polestar Cyan Racing	Volvo S60 Polestar TC1	FRA; 1; 7	FRA; 2 Ret	SVK; 1 DSQ	SVK; 2 DSQ	HUN; 1; 15	HUN; 2; 4	MAR; 1; 9	MAR; 2; 10	GER; 1 Ret	GER; 2; 8	RUS; 1 Ret	RUS; 2; 15	POR; 1; 7	POR; 2; 6	ARG; 1; 11	ARG; 2; 14	JPN; 1; 6	JPN; 2; 7	CHN; 1; 1	CHN; 2; 7	QAT; 1; 6	QAT; 2; 2			10th	117
2017	Polestar Cyan Racing	Volvo S60 Polestar TC1	MAR; 1; 2	MAR; 2; 7	ITA; 1; 5	**ITA**; **2**; 1	HUN; 1 NC	HUN; 2; 7	GER; 1; 1	GER; 2; 4	POR; 1; 3	POR; 2; 2	ARG; 1; 6	ARG; 2; 3	CHN; 1 NC	CHN; 2; 2‡	JPN; 1; 4	JPN; 2; 5	MAC; 1; 4	MAC; 2; 5	QAT; 1; 5	QAT; 2; 4					1st	283.5

^{‡} Half points awarded as less than 75% of race distance was completed.

=== Complete World Touring Car Cup results ===
(key) (Races in bold indicate pole position) (Races in italics indicate fastest lap)

Year	Team	Car	1	2	3	4	5	6	7	8	9	10	11	12	13	14	15	16	17	18	19	20	21	22	23	24	25	26	27	28	29	30	DC	Points
2018	M Racing – YMR	Hyundai i30 N TCR	**MAR**; **1**; 2	MAR; 2; 5	MAR; 3; 3	HUN; 1; 9	HUN; 2; 12	HUN; 3; 9	**GER**; **1**; 2	GER; 2 Ret	**GER**; **3**; 1	NED; 1; 14	NED; 2; 16	NED; 3; 15	POR; 1 Ret	POR; 2; 10	**POR**; **3**; 1	SVK; 1; 13	SVK; 2; 10	SVK; 3; 4	**CHN**; **1**; 1	CHN; 2; 7	**CHN**; **3**; 1	WUH; 1; 12	WUH; 2 Ret	WUH; 3; 10	JPN; 1 Ret	JPN; 2; 12	JPN; 3; 8	MAC; 1; 11	MAC; 2 Ret	MAC; 3; 8	7th	242
2019	Cyan Racing Lynk & Co	Lynk & Co 03 TCR	MAR; 1; 2	MAR; 2; 6	MAR; 3; 1	HUN; 1; 7	HUN; 2 Ret	HUN; 3; 5	SVK; 1; 23	SVK; 2; 22	SVK; 3; 11	**NED**; **1**; 1	NED; 2; 12	NED; 3; 1	GER; 1; 11	GER; 2; 12	GER; 3 Ret	POR; 1; 8	POR; 2; 13	POR; 3; 7	CHN; 1; 12	CHN; 2; 4	CHN; 3; 5	JPN; 1; 4	JPN; 2; 5	JPN; 3; 3	MAC; 1; 5	MAC; 2; 2	MAC; 3; 7	MAL; 1; 27	MAL; 2; 23	MAL; 3; 7	4th	297
2020	Cyan Performance Lynk & Co	Lynk & Co 03 TCR	BEL; 1; 2	BEL; 2 Ret	GER; 1; 4	GER; 2; 2	SVK; 1; 19	SVK; 2; 16	SVK; 3; 15	HUN; 1; 10	HUN; 2; 12	HUN; 3; 12	ESP; 1 Ret	ESP; 2; 7	ESP; 3; 1	ARA; 1; 11	ARA; 2; 7	ARA; 3; 6															9th	142
2021	Cyan Performance Lynk & Co	Lynk & Co 03 TCR	GER; 1; 13	GER; 2 Ret	POR; 1; 6	POR; 2; 7	ESP; 1; 10	ESP; 2; 2	HUN; 1; 5	HUN; 2; 7	CZE; 1; 5	CZE; 2; 15	FRA; 1; 2	FRA; 2; 9	ITA; 1; 12	ITA; 2; 8	RUS; 1; 10	RUS; 2; 11															9th	141
2022	Cyan Performance Lynk & Co	Lynk & Co 03 TCR	FRA; 1 Ret	FRA; 2; 9	GER; 1 C	GER; 2 C	HUN; 1; 11	HUN; 2; 11	ESP; 1; 9	ESP; 2; 10	POR; 1 Ret	POR; 2; 11	ITA; 1 DNS	ITA; 2 DNS	ALS; 1 WD	ALS; 2 WD	BHR; 1	BHR; 2	SAU; 1	SAU; 2													17th	35

=== Complete TCR World Tour results ===
(key) (Races in bold indicate pole position) (Races in italics indicate fastest lap)

Year	Team	Car	1	2	3	4	5	6	7	8	9	10	11	12	13	14	15	16	17	18	19	20	21	DC	Points
2023	Cyan Racing Lynk & Co	Lynk & Co 03 FL TCR	ALG; 1; 8	ALG; 2; 2	SPA; 1; 9	SPA; 2; 9	VAL; 1; 3	VAL; 2; 6	HUN; 1; 8	HUN; 2; 1	ELP; 1; 2	ELP; 2; 9	VIL; 1 Ret	VIL; 2; 6	SYD; 1; 9	SYD; 2 Ret	SYD; 3; 15	BAT; 1; 5	BAT; 2; 3	BAT; 3; 2	MAC; 1; 8	MAC; 2; 4		7th	320
2024	Cyan Racing Lynk & Co	Lynk & Co 03 FL TCR	VAL; 1; 6^{5}	VAL; 2; 5	MRK; 1; 8	MRK; 2; 9	MOH; 1; 1^{3}	MOH; 2; 6	SAP; 1; 5^{6}	SAP; 2; 2	ELP; 1; 3^{5}	ELP; 2; 1	ZHZ; 1; 3^{2}	ZHZ; 2; 10	**MAC**; **1**; 1^{1}	MAC; 2; 8								2nd	312
2025	Lynk & Co Cyan Racing	Lynk & Co 03 FL TCR	AHR; 1; 1	AHR; 2; 4	AHR; 3; 2	CRT; 1; 5	CRT; 2; 9	CRT; 3; 10	MNZ; 1; 3	MNZ; 2; 3	CVR; 1; 7	CVR; 2; 1	BEN; 1 C	BEN; 2; 5	BEN; 3; 7	INJ; 1; 3	INJ; 2; 3	INJ; 3; 1	ZHZ; 1; 2	ZHZ; 2; 4	ZHZ; 3; 2	MAC; 1; 5	MAC; 2; 3	2nd	460
2026	Geely Cyan Racing	Geely Preface TCR	MIS; 1; 5	MIS; 2; 3	CRT; 1; 2	CRT; 2; 6	CRT; 3; 2	LEC; 1; 13	LEC; 2; 5	CVR; 1 Ret	CVR; 2; 7	INJ; 1; 2	INJ; 2; 4	INJ; 3; 2	CHE; 1; 6	CHE; 2; 4	CHE; 3; 7	ZHZ; 1; 4	ZHZ; 2; 3	ZHZ; 3; 3	MAC; 1	MAC; 2		4th*	353*

^{*} Season still in progress.

=== Complete TCR Europe Touring Car Series results ===
(key) (Races in bold indicate pole position) (Races in italics indicate fastest lap)

Year	Team	Car	1	2	3	4	5	6	7	8	9	10	11	12	13	14	DC	Points
2023	Cyan Racing Lynk & Co	Lynk & Co 03 FL TCR	ALG; 1; 8	ALG; 2; 2	PAU; 1	PAU; 2	SPA; 1; 9	SPA; 2; 9	HUN; 1; 8	HUN; 2; 1	LEC; 1	LEC; 2	MNZ; 1	MNZ; 2	CAT; 1	CAT; 2	NC‡	0‡

^{‡} Driver was a World Tour full-time entry and was ineligible for points.

Sporting positions
Preceded by Jimmy Bohlin	Swedish Formula 3 Championship; Champion; 1999	Succeeded by Mikael Karlsson
Preceded by Jimmy Bohlin	Nordic Formula 3 Championship; Champion; 1999	Succeeded by Mikael Karlsson
Preceded by Peter Owen; Mark Smithson	FIA Sportscar Championship; SR2 Champion; 2001; With: Larry Oberto	Succeeded by Mirko Savoldi; Piergiuseppe Peroni
Preceded by Richard Göransson	Swedish Touring Car Championship; Champion; 2006	Succeeded by Fredrik Ekblom
Preceded by Tomas Engström	Camaro Cup; Champion; 2011	Succeeded by Tobias Brink
Preceded by Johan Kristoffersson	Scandinavian Touring Car Championship; Champion; 2013–2015	Succeeded by Richard Göransson
Preceded by José María López	World Touring Car Championship; Champion; 2017	Succeeded by Gabriele Tarquini (WTCR)
