= 2003 Norwegian Touring Car Championship =

Seasons
- ← 2002 2004 →

The 2003 Norwegian Touring Car Championship season was the 2nd of 3 seasons of the championship. It was decided over six race weekends (comprising twelve races) at three different circuits.

The championship was won by Alf-Aslak Eng with Team Eng's Auto.

== Teams and Drivers ==
Team	Car	No.	Drivers	Rounds
Petter Granlund	Ford Mondeo	3	(Norway) Petter Grunland	2
Østfold Shell Olje Racing Team	Vauxhall Vectra	4	(Norway) Bjørn-Arild Martinsen	All
Østfold Shell Olje Racing Team	Vauxhall Vectra	13	(Norway) Camilla Antonsen	1, 3, 6
Østfold Shell Olje Racing Team	Nissan Primera	15	(Norway) Simen Tvete	1-3, 5-6
Team HP Autoracing	BMW 320i	7	(Norway) Hans-Peter Havdal	1-4, 6
Otter Ødegården	BMW 320	8	(Norway) Otter Ødegården	6
Frank Valle	BMW 320	10	(Norway) Frank Valle	2-6
Sällfors Motorsport	BMW 320i	11	(Sweden) Torbjörn Sällfors	All
Team Eng's Auto	BMW 320i	12	(Norway) André Westbye	1, 6
Team Eng's Auto	BMW 320i	12	(Norway) Henning Solberg	2
Team Eng's Auto	BMW 320i	12	(Norway) Roger Rui	3-4
Team Eng's Auto	BMW 320i	21	(Norway) Alf-Aslak Eng	All
Kristoffersson Motorsport	Volvo S40	16	(Norway) Jarle Gåsland	4
Johannes Øye	Volvo S40	19	(Norway) Johannes Øye	1
Anderson Motorsport	Ford Mondeo	91	(Norway) Terje Andersen	2, 6
Per Skjolden	Opel Vectra	?	(Norway) Per Skjolden	1

== Race calendar and winners ==
Round		Circuit	Date	Pole position	Fastest lap	Winning driver	Winning team
1	R1	(Norway) Rudskogen Motorsenter	12 May	(Norway) Bjørn-Arild Martinsen	(Norway) Bjørn-Arild Martinsen	(Norway) Bjørn-Arild Martinsen	Østfold Shell Olje Racing Team
1	R2	(Norway) Rudskogen Motorsenter	12 May	(Norway) Hans-Peter Havdal	(Norway) Bjørn-Arild Martinsen	(Norway) Alf-Aslak Eng	Team Eng's Auto
2	R3	(Norway) Vålerbanen	1 June	(Norway) Petter Granlund	(Norway) Petter Granlund	(Norway) Petter Granlund	Petter Granlund
2	R4	(Norway) Vålerbanen	1 June	(Norway) Petter Granlund	(Norway) Petter Granlund	(Norway) Alf-Aslak Eng	Team Eng's Auto
3	R5	(Norway) Arctic Circle Raceway	6 July	(Norway) Alf-Aslak Eng	(Norway) Frank Valle	(Norway) Frank Valle	Frank Valle
3	R6	(Norway) Arctic Circle Raceway	6 July	(Norway) Frank Valle	(Norway) Frank Valle	(Norway) Frank Valle	Frank Valle
4	R7	(Norway) Rudskogen Motorsenter	24 August	(Norway) Alf-Aslak Eng	(Norway) Jarle Gåsland	(Norway) Jarle Gåsland	Kristoffersson Motorsport
4	R8	(Norway) Rudskogen Motorsenter	24 August	(Norway) Jarle Gåsland	(Norway) Jarle Gåsland	(Norway) Jarle Gåsland	Kristoffersson Motorsport
5	R9	(Norway) Vålerbanen	14 September	(Norway) Alf-Aslak Eng	?	(Norway) Bjørn-Arild Martinsen	Østfold Shell Olje Racing Team
5	R10	(Norway) Vålerbanen	14 September	?	(Norway) Frank Valle	(Norway) Frank Valle	Frank Valle
6	R11	(Norway) Rudskogen Motorsenter	21 September	(Norway) Frank Valle	?	(Norway) Frank Valle	Frank Valle
6	R12	(Norway) Rudskogen Motorsenter	21 September	?	?	(Norway) Alf-Aslak Eng	Team Eng's Auto

== Drivers Championship ==
Points were awarded to the top ten drivers in a race as follows: 20, 15, 12, 10, 8, 6, 4, 3, 2, 1.

Pos.	Driver	RUS (Norway)		VÅL (Norway)		ARC (Norway)		RUS (Norway)		VÅL (Norway)		RUS (Norway)		Pts
1	(Norway) Alf-Aslak Eng	2	1	2	1	2	2	2	2	Ret	Ret	2	1	165
2	(Norway) Bjørn-Arild Martinsen	1	2	3	2	7	Ret	4	5	1	2	4	7	133
3	(Norway) Frank Valle			5	5	1	1	7	6	Ret	1	1	Ret	106
4	(Norway) Hans-Peter Havdal	4	6	4	4	3	3	3	3			3	5	104
5	(Sweden) Torbjörn Sällfors	5	4	6	7	6	4	6	7	3	3	7	3	94
6	(Norway) Simen Tvete	Ret	Ret	Ret	DNS	4	5			2	Ret	5	2	56
7	(Norway) Camilla Antonsen	3	3			5	Ret					6	6	44
8	(Norway) Jarle Gåsland							1	1					40
9	(Norway) Petter Granlund			1	3									32
10	(Norway) André Westbye	6	5									8	4	27
11	(Norway) Roger Rui					Ret	Ret	5	4					18
12	(Norway) Henning Solberg			7	6									10
13	(Norway) Otter Ødegården											9	Ret	2
-	(Norway) Terje Andersen			Ret	DNS							NC	Ret	0
-	(Norway) Johannes Øye	Ret	Ret											0
-	(Norway) Per Skjolden	Ret	DNS											0
Pos.	Driver	RUS (Norway)		VÅL (Norway)		ARC (Norway)		RUS (Norway)		VÅL (Norway)		RUS (Norway)		Pts

Colour	Result
Gold	Winner
Silver	Second place
Bronze	Third place
Green	Points classification
Blue	Non-points classification
Blue	Non-classified finish (NC)
Purple	Retired, not classified (Ret)
Red	Did not qualify (DNQ)
Red	Did not pre-qualify (DNPQ)
Black	Disqualified (DSQ)
White	Did not start (DNS)
White	Withdrew (WD)
White	Race cancelled (C)
Blank	Did not practice (DNP)
Blank	Did not arrive (DNA)
Blank	Excluded (EX)
