= NIKA Racing =

(Sweden) NIKA Racing
- Founded: 2006
- Team principal(s): Nicklas Karlsson; Eric Lindgren
- Current series: WTCC
- Former series: STCC; STCC (Sweden)
- Noted drivers: 17. Michel Nykjær
- Teams' Championships: 2012 STCC
- Drivers' Championships: 2011 STCC (Rydell)

NIKA racing (short for Nicklas Karlsson Racing) is a Swedish racing team, founded by former racing driver Nicklas Karlsson along with Eric Lindgren which currently competes in the World Touring Car Championship. Before that they competed in the Scandinavian Touring Car Championship where they won the teams' championship title in 2011.

== Swedish Touring Car Championship ==
=== Chevrolet Lacetti (2007–2009) ===
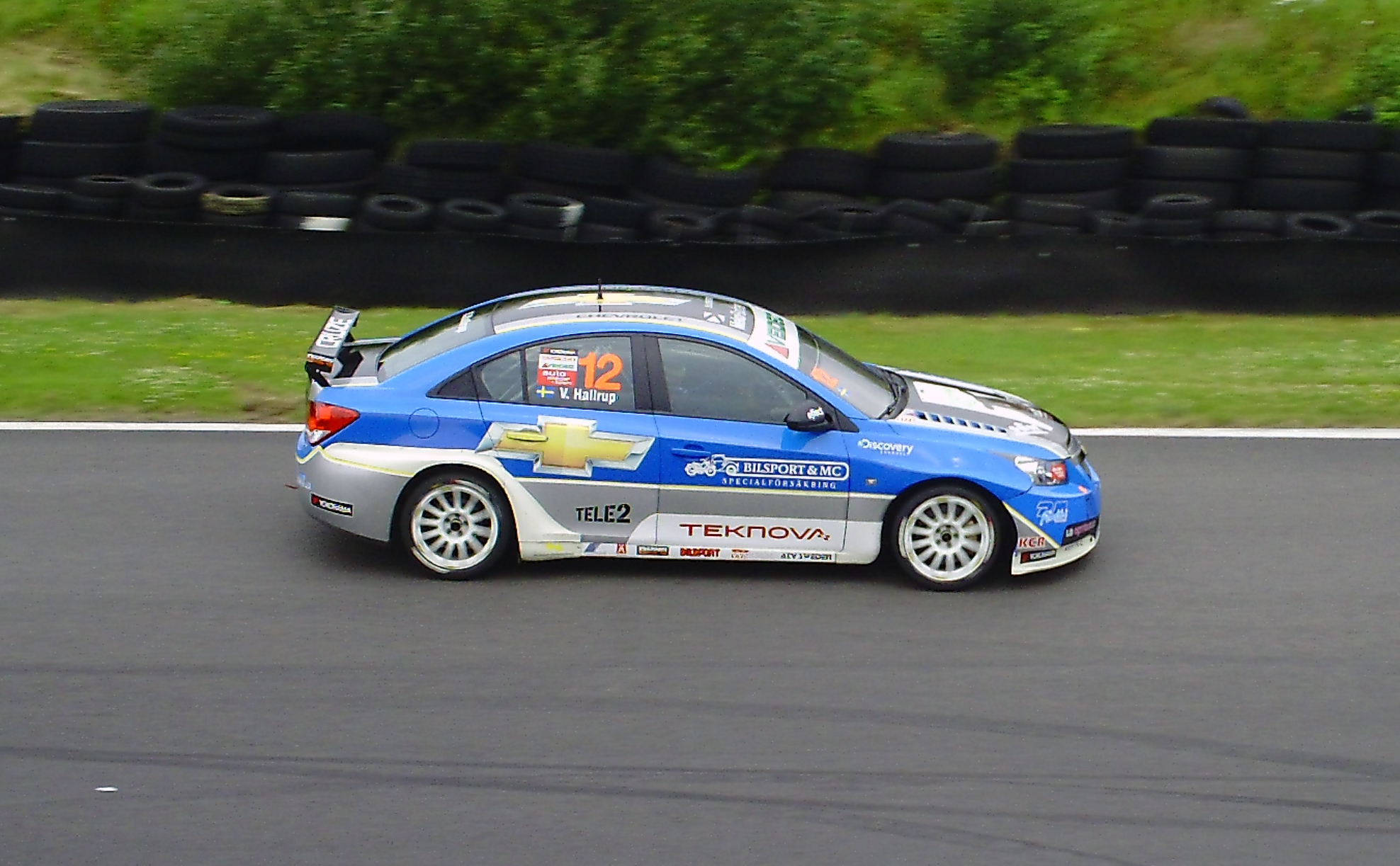
Viktor Hallrup at Falkenbergs Motorbana in 2011.

Karlsson founded the team in 2006 and to run a Chevrolet Lacetti for himself under the Chevrolet Motorsport Sweden banner in Swedish Touring Car Championship in 2007, but started at two races only during the season.

He stepped aside for 2008 to become team manager and the team ran Norwegian Thomas Schie in their car. Schie remained for the most part among the top ten and scored a best result second place in Gothenburg. He finished seventh in the drivers' championship while the team finished fifth in the teams' championship.

Schie continued for the team during the 2009 season, but was forced to leave after six races. What actually was the reason for this is not entirely clear. Schie said that the team was not enough professionally, while Nicklas Karlsson said that was because Schie could not afford to continue. The seat was taken over by Pontus Mörth, who completed the season. He often took a few points in the races, but never came up on the podium. Mörth finished eleven in total, while Schie was fourteenth. In the team championship Chevrolet Motorsport Sweden finished fifth.

== World Touring Car Championship ==
=== Chevrolet Cruze (2010, 2012–2013) ===
In 2010 Chevrolet Motorsport Sweden joined the World Touring Car Championship for the 2010 FIA WTCC Race of Italy, running a Chevrolet Cruze LT for TC 2000 Championship driver Leonel Pernía who became the first Argentine to race in the WTCC. The team were not eligible for the Yokohama Team's Trophy as the regulations exclude any teams with the name of a car manufacturer from inclusion in the trophy. Pernía finished eighteenth in race one after an excursion through the gravel trap at the Parabolica but he scored a single point in race two when he finished tenth.

The team returned to the championship in 2012, entering a Chevrolet Cruze 1.6T for Rickard Rydell at the season opening 2012 FIA WTCC Race of Italy. Rydell lined up fifth in qualifying and finished both races in the points, including fourth place and a fastest lap in race one.

The team running as NIKA Racing will return to the WTCC in 2013 for the full season with a single Chevrolet Cruze 1.6T. They signed Michel Nykjær to drive for them having finished third in the 2012 Scandinavian Touring Car Championship season with the team. However Nykjær left the team before the end of the season and was replaced by Hiroki Yoshimoto in Japan, Rickard Rydell in China and Yukinori Taniguchi in Macau respectively.

=== Honda Civic (2014-2015) ===
In 2014 NIKA Racing announced that they will compete in the TC2 category with Yukinori Taniguchi driving Honda Civic The team ultimately appeareded only in Hungary.

For the 2015 season the team upgraded to TC1-spec Honda Civic WTCC, built by JAS Motorsport. Rickard Rydell returned to the series with the team. However, illness forced him to miss some early-season events, and Néstor Girolami was later drafted in to race in Slovakia and Portugal, the latter of which turned out to be the team's last-ever race meeting.

=== Chevrolet Cruze (2016) ===
For 2016 season the team sold the Honda Civic to Zengő Motorsport to compete with a Chevrolet Cruze and the driver John Bryant-Meisner. However, the team never showed up owing to financial challenges with Bryant-Meisner's sponsors, and the team withdrew from all racing activities thereafter.

== Results ==
=== World Touring Car Championship ===
Year	Car	Drivers	Races	Wins	Poles	F.L.	Points	D.C.	T.C.
2010	Chevrolet Cruze LT	(Argentina) Leonel Pernía	2	0	0	0	1	22nd	–
2012	Chevrolet Cruze 1.6T	(Sweden) Rickard Rydell	2	0	0	1	14	19th	–
2013	Chevrolet Cruze 1.6T	(Denmark) Michel Nykjær	18	3	1	1	180	7th	7th
2013	Chevrolet Cruze 1.6T	(Japan) Hiroki Yoshimoto	2	0	0	0	0	—	
2013	Chevrolet Cruze 1.6T	(Sweden) Rickard Rydell	2	0	0	0	0	—	
2013	Chevrolet Cruze 1.6T	(Japan) Yukinori Taniguchi	2	0	0	0	0	—	
2014	Honda Civic WTCC	(Japan) Yukinori Taniguchi	2	0	0	0	0	–	–
