= 2015 Scandinavian Touring Car Championship =

The 2015 Scandinavian Touring Car Championship was the fifth Scandinavian Touring Car Championship season. The season started at the new circuit in Skövde Airport on 8 May and ended on 26 September at Ring Knutstorp, after seven rounds. It was the third year of TTA – Racing Elite League silhouette regulations in the series following the merge of the STCC and TTA at the end of the 2012 season. Thed Björk entered the season as the defending drivers' champion and successfully defended his title. Volvo Polestar Racing will be the defending teams' champion. Both Björk and Volvo Polestar Racing retained their titles after the season.

== Teams and drivers ==
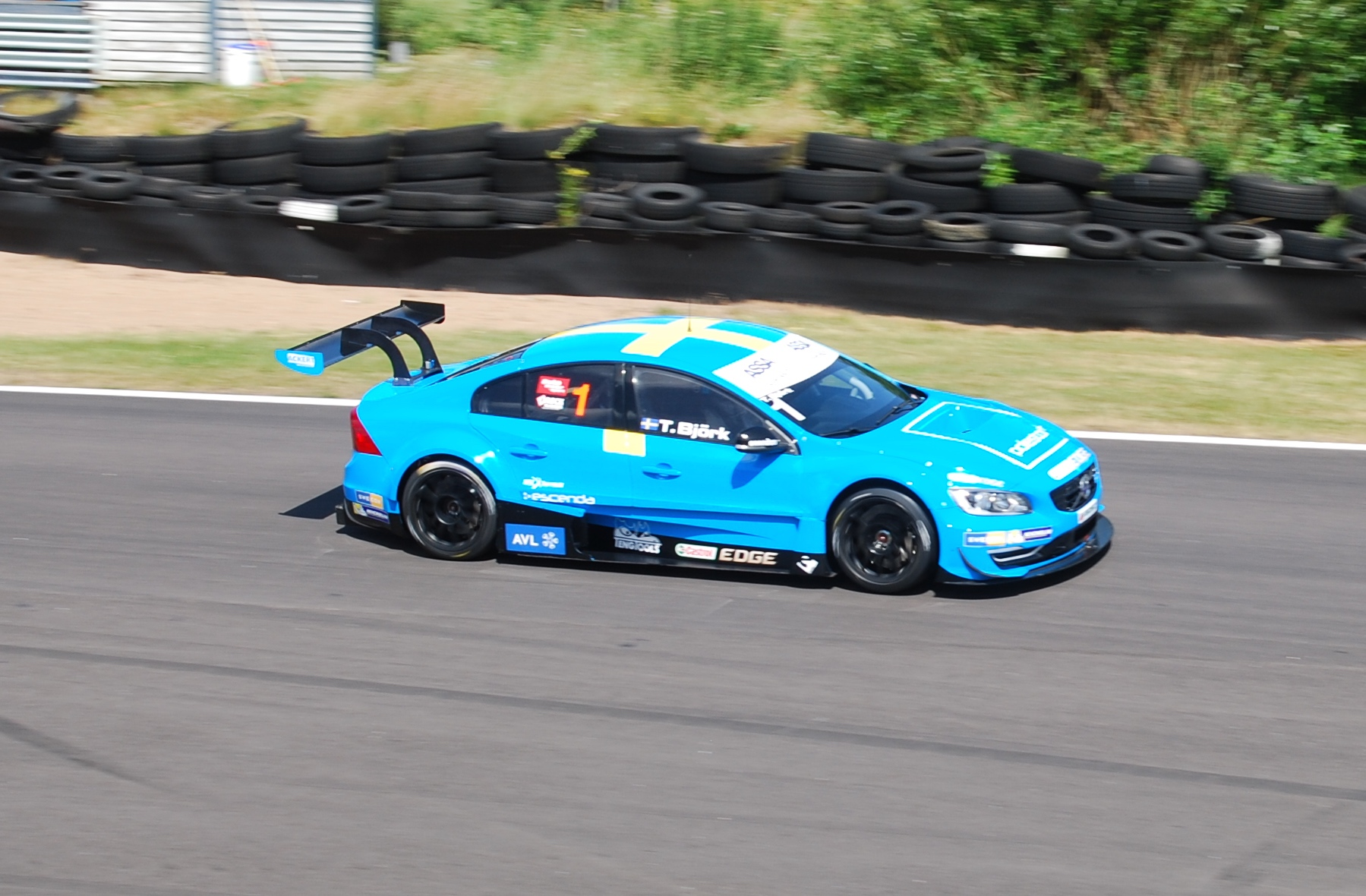
Volvo S60 Solution F of Thed Björk

All teams were Swedish-registered.

Team	Car	No.	Driver	Rounds
Volvo Polestar Racing; Volvo Cyan Racing	Volvo S60	1	(Sweden) Thed Björk	All
Volvo Polestar Racing; Volvo Cyan Racing	Volvo S60	11	(Sweden) Fredrik Ekblom	All
Volvo Polestar Racing; Volvo Cyan Racing	Volvo S60	13	(Sweden) Carl Philip Bernadotte	1–2, 4–7
Team Tidö	Saab 9-3	3	(Sweden) Richard Göransson	All
Team Tidö	Saab 9-3	8	(Sweden) Roger Samuelsson	All
WCR BMW Dealer Team	BMW SR	4	(Sweden) Fredrik Larsson	All
Sportpromotion	BMW SR	6	(Sweden) Erik Jonsson	All
Team Kia	KIA Optima BDE	9	(Norway) Kevin Aabol	All
Team Kia	KIA Optima BDE	10	(Sweden) Erik Johansson	1–5
Team Kia	KIA Optima BDE	28	(Sweden) Rasmus Mårthen	5–7
Dacia Dealer Team	Dacia	20	(Sweden) Mattias Andersson	All
PWR Racing Team	Saab 9-3	37	(Sweden) Daniel Haglöf	All
PWR Racing Team	Saab 9-3	93	(Finland) Emma Kimiläinen	All
Brovallendesign Kia	KIA Optima BDE	95	(Sweden) Emelie Liljeström	1, 3–4, 6

== Race calendar and results ==
All rounds will be held in Sweden.

Round		Circuit	Location	Date	Pole position	Fastest lap	Race winner	Winning team
1	R1	STCC Volvo Race Skövde	Skövde, Västra Götaland	9 May	(Sweden) Thed Björk	(Sweden) Thed Björk	(Sweden) Thed Björk	Volvo Polestar Racing
1	R2	STCC Volvo Race Skövde	Skövde, Västra Götaland	9 May		(Sweden) Thed Björk	(Sweden) Thed Björk	Volvo Polestar Racing
2	R3	Anderstorp Raceway	Anderstorp, Jönköping	30 May	(Sweden) Richard Göransson	(Sweden) Thed Björk	(Sweden) Thed Björk	Volvo Polestar Racing
2	R4	Anderstorp Raceway	Anderstorp, Jönköping	30 May		(Sweden) Fredrik Larsson	(Sweden) Fredrik Larsson	WCR BMW Dealer Team
3	R5	Mantorp Park	Mantorp, Östergötland	25 June	(Sweden) Thed Björk	(Sweden) Thed Björk	(Sweden) Thed Björk	Volvo Polestar Racing
3	R6	Mantorp Park	Mantorp, Östergötland	25 June		(Sweden) Fredrik Larsson	(Sweden) Fredrik Ekblom	Volvo Polestar Racing
4	R7	Falkenbergs Motorbana	Bergagård, Halland	11 July	(Sweden) Fredrik Larsson	(Sweden) Fredrik Larsson	(Sweden) Fredrik Larsson	WCR BMW Dealer Team
4	R8	Falkenbergs Motorbana	Bergagård, Halland	11 July		(Sweden) Fredrik Larsson	(Sweden) Carl Philip Bernadotte	Volvo Polestar Racing
5	R9	Karlskoga Motorstadion	Karlskoga, Örebro	15 August	(Sweden) Thed Björk	(Sweden) Thed Björk	(Sweden) Thed Björk	Volvo Polestar Racing
5	R10	Karlskoga Motorstadion	Karlskoga, Örebro	15 August		(Sweden) Thed Björk	(Sweden) Fredrik Ekblom	Volvo Polestar Racing
6	R11	Solvalla	Stockholm, Stockholm	12 September	(Sweden) Thed Björk	(Sweden) Fredrik Larsson	(Sweden) Daniel Haglöf	PWR Racing Team
6	R12	Solvalla	Stockholm, Stockholm	12 September		(Sweden) Fredrik Larsson	(Sweden) Fredrik Larsson	WCR BMW Dealer Team
7	R13	Ring Knutstorp	Kågeröd, Skåne	26 September	(Sweden) Fredrik Ekblom	(Sweden) Fredrik Ekblom	(Sweden) Fredrik Ekblom	Volvo Cyan Racing
7	R14	Ring Knutstorp	Kågeröd, Skåne	26 September		(Sweden) Fredrik Ekblom	(Sweden) Fredrik Ekblom	Volvo Cyan Racing

== Championship standings ==
=== Drivers' championship ===
Pos	Driver	SKÖ			AND			MAN			FAL			GEL			SOL			KNU			Pts
Pos	Driver	Q1	R1	R2	Q2	R3	R4	Q3	R5	R6	Q4	R7	R8	Q5	R9	R10	Q6	R11	R12	Q7	R13	R14	Pts
1	(Sweden) Thed Björk	2	**1**	1	2	1	4	3	**1**	2	4	3	11†	1	**1**	4	2	**3**	6	1	3	3	366
2	(Sweden) Fredrik Ekblom	1	2	Ret	3	3	2	1	3	1	1	2	Ret	2	2	1	4	7	5	2	**1**	1	356
3	(Sweden) Fredrik Larsson	5	5	2	4	2	1	2	2	4	2	**1**	8	4	4	Ret	7	4	1	4	10	Ret	268
4	(Sweden) Richard Göransson	4	Ret	Ret	1	**6**	6	4	5	6	3	4	2	3	6	3	5	2	3	5	2	7	243
5	(Sweden) Mattias Andersson	3	3	3	8	7	7	8	4	5	6	6	3	6	3	2	3	6	9	7	5	8	204
6	(Sweden) Daniel Haglöf	6	4	5†	7	4	5	7	6	7	8	11†	Ret	13	8	Ret	1	1	2	9	11	2	174
7	(Finland) Emma Kimiläinen	7	6	Ret	6	5	3	5	7	3	9	9	9	9	7	10†	6	5	4	3	4	6	158
8	(Sweden) Erik Johansson	8	Ret	4†	5	9	8	9	8	11†	5	5	4	7	5	6							94
9	(Norway) Kevin Aabol	13	8	Ret	9	10	10	6	10	8	7	Ret	5	10	12†	Ret	8	9	6	10	6	4	71
10	(Sweden) Carl Philip Bernadotte	9	9	Ret	11	8	9				10	Ret	1	5	10	7	11	11	11	6	8	10	66
11	(Sweden) Erik Jonsson	10	7	Ret	10	Ret	DNS	10	9	10	11	7	6	8	Ret	9†	9	8	DNS	8	Ret	6	52
12	(Sweden) Rasmus Mårthen													11	9	5	10	10	8	11	7	Ret	24
13	(Sweden) Roger Samuelsson	11	10	6†	12	11	Ret	11	11	9	13	10	10	12	11	8	12	12	10	12	9	9	22
14	(Sweden) Emile Liljeström	12	Ret	Ret				DNS	Ret	Ret	12	8	7				13	Ret	12				10

Colour	Result
Gold	Winner
Silver	Second place
Bronze	Third place
Green	Points classification
Blue	Non-points classification
Blue	Non-classified finish (NC)
Purple	Retired, not classified (Ret)
Red	Did not qualify (DNQ)
Red	Did not pre-qualify (DNPQ)
Black	Disqualified (DSQ)
White	Did not start (DNS)
White	Withdrew (WD)
White	Race cancelled (C)
Blank	Did not practice (DNP)
Blank	Did not arrive (DNA)
Blank	Excluded (EX)

**Bold** – Pole
Italics – Fastest Lap

Notes:

- † — Drivers did not finish the race, but were classified as they completed over 70% of the race distance.

=== Teams' championship ===
Pos	Team	SKÖ	AND	MAN	FAL	GEL	SOL	KNU	Pts
1	Volvo Polestar Racing; Volvo Cyan Racing	111	103	123	71	123	69	123	723
2	PWR Racing Team	44	61	51	12	16	98	58	340
3	Team Tidö	23	42	32	55	45	44	40	281
4	WCR BMW Dealer Team	38	55	48	49	24	43	14	271
5	Dacia Dealer Team	45	16	26	34	43	25	22	211
6	Team Kia	20	24	19	53	28	12	22	178
7	Sportpromotion	8	1	4	17	10	6	16	62
8	Brovallendesign Kia	0		0	12	13	6	7	38
