= Mikael Ohlsson =

Swedish businessman

Mikael Ohlsson is the former president of the Swedish furniture store chain, IKEA. Ohlsson has worked for IKEA for 30 years, starting off in the carpet department in the Linköping store. He started his assignment as head of the company on 1 September 2009 and was succeeded by Peter Agnefjäll in September 2013. Ohlsson is married and has one daughter and two sons.
