= 2008 Swedish Touring Car Championship =

Seasons
- ← 2007 2009 →

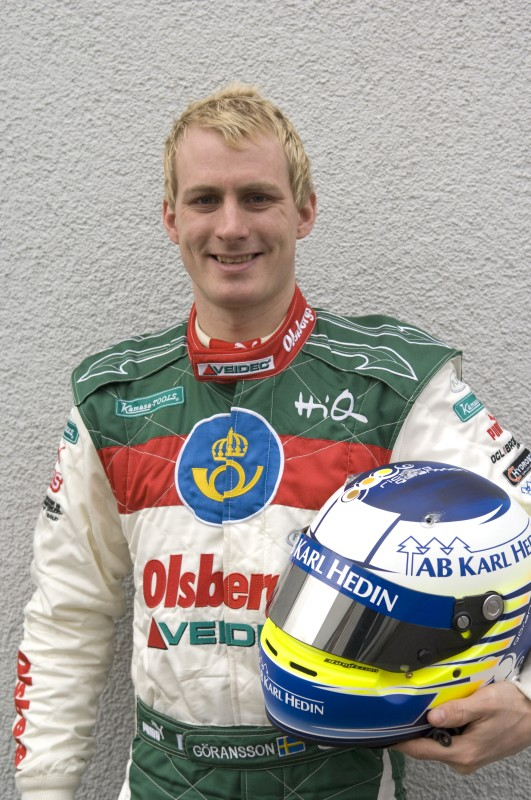
Richard Göransson won the championship by seven points.

The 2008 Swedish Touring Car Championship season was the 13th Swedish Touring Car Championship (STCC) season.

== Drivers ==
These were the STCC entries for the 2008 season. Entrants with numbers 90 and above also competed in the privateer competition known as Semcon Cup. All teams were Swedish-registered.

Team	Car	No.	Drivers	Class	Rounds
WestCoast Racing / BMW Dealer Team	BMW 320si E90	1	(Sweden) Fredrik Ekblom	D	All
WestCoast Racing / BMW Dealer Team	BMW 320si E90	6	(Sweden) Robin Rudholm	D	All
Volvo Olsbergs Green Racing	Volvo C30	2	(Sweden) Robert Dahlgren	D	All
Volvo Olsbergs Green Racing	Volvo C30	9	(Norway) Tommy Rustad	D	1-8,10-11
Flash Engineering	BMW 320si E90	3	(Sweden) Richard Göransson	D	All
Flash Engineering	BMW 320si 6-spd Seq	5	(Sweden) Jan "Flash" Nilsson	D	All
Honda Racing	Honda Accord Euro R	4	(Sweden) Thed Björk	D	All
Honda Racing	Honda Accord Euro R	7	(Sweden) Tomas Engström	D	All
Nordic Fine Art	SEAT León	8	(Sweden) Roger Eriksson	D	All
Kristoffersson Motorsport	Audi A4	14	(Sweden) Tommy Kristoffersson	D	1-4,8-11
Kristoffersson Motorsport	Audi A4	15	(Russia) Alexander Lvov	D	2-3,6-7,9-11
CMS Team Sweden	Audi A4	17	(Sweden) Andreas Simonsen	D	5
MA:GP	Alfa Romeo 156	20	(Sweden) Mattias Andersson	D	All
IPS Motorsport	Peugeot 308	21	(Sweden) Johan Stureson	D	All
Chevrolet Motorsport Sweden	Chevrolet Lacetti	22	(Norway) Thomas Schie	D	All
Elgh Motorsport	BMW 320si 6-spd Seq	28	(Sweden) Carl Rosenblad	D	1-2,5,7,9,11
Brovallen Motorsport	Mercedes C200	90	(Sweden) Tobias Johansson	S	1,3-11
Team Caliber	BMW 320i E46	93	(Sweden) Dick Sahlén	S	All
Team Nya Åkeriet Örebro	BMW 320i E46	94	(Sweden) Mikael Eklund	S	7
Huggare Racing	BMW 320i E46	96	(Sweden) Viktor Huggare	S	1-5,7,11
BMS Event	BMW 320i E46	97	(Sweden) Joakim Ahlberg	S	1-2,5-11
Tysslinge Racing	BMW 320i E46	95	(Sweden) Tobias Tegelby	S	4
Brandt Racing	Volvo S60	99	(Sweden) Ronnie Brandt	S	4,11

Icon	Class
D	Drivers' Championship
S	Semcon Cup

== Race calendar ==
The calendar for the 2008 season were as follows:

Round	Circuit	Date
1	(Sweden) Ring Knutstorp	20 April
2	(Sweden) Sturup Raceway	4 May
3	(Sweden) Mantorp Park	18 May
4	(Sweden) Karlskoga Motorstadion	1 June
5	(Sweden) Göteborg City Race	14 June
6	(Sweden) Sturup Raceway	29 June
7	(Sweden) Falkenbergs Motorbana	13 July
8	(Sweden) Karlskoga Motorstadion	17 August
9	(Sweden) Ring Knutstorp	31 August
10	(Norway) Vålerbanen	14 September
11	(Sweden) Mantorp Park (Grande Finale)	28 September

== Results and standings ==
=== Drivers' championship ===
The drivers' championship 2008 was won by Richard Göransson.

Pos.	Driver	KNU (Sweden)	STU (Sweden)	MAN (Sweden)	KAR (Sweden)	GÖT (Sweden)	STU (Sweden)	FAL (Sweden)	KAR (Sweden)	KNU (Sweden)	VÅL (Norway)	MAN (Sweden)	Pts
1	(Sweden) Richard Göransson	1	5	6	1	9	1	4	3	1	3	6	67
2	(Sweden) Fredrik Ekblom	2	1	3	Ret	3	5	1	2	9	12	2	60
3	(Sweden) Thed Björk	9	3	1	6	1	3	Ret	1	7	5	3	57
4	(Sweden) Robin Rudholm	3	4	5	2	6	4	2	9	2	8	14	48
5	(Sweden) Robert Dahlgren	Ret	13	4	5	Ret	13	7	5	3	1	1	41
6	(Sweden) Jan "Flash" Nilsson	6	7	7	3	7	7	6	8	5	6	10	28
7	(Norway) Thomas Schie	8	Ret	8	4	2	8	15	Ret	8	4	5	26
8	(Sweden) Tomas Engström	4	10	16	Ret	4	6	9	Ret	4	7	8	21
9	(Norway) Tommy Rustad	10	Ret	2	Ret	5	10	5	6		DSQ	Ret	19
10	(Sweden) Johan Stureson	Ret	6	10	Ret	Ret	2	8	7	Ret	Ret	4	19
11	(Sweden) Mattias Andersson	5	2	Ret	10	DNS	14	12	4	Ret	DNS	11	17
12	(Sweden) Roger Eriksson	7	Ret	11	8	Ret	9	Ret	11	Ret	2	7	13
13	(Sweden) Carl Rosenblad	DSQ	8			10		3		Ret		18	7
14	(Sweden) Tommy Kristoffersson	Ret	9	9	9				10	6	Ret	17	3
15	(Sweden) Tobias Johansson	11		12	7	8	12	10	12	10	9	9	3
16	(Sweden) Dick Sahlén	12	12	13	11	12	11	13	14	11	13	12	0
17	(Sweden) Joakim Ahlberg	13	Ret			13	Ret	Ret	13	Ret	11	15	0
18	(Sweden) Viktor Huggare	Ret	11	14	12	Ret		11				13	0
19	(Russia) Alexander Lvov		Ret	15			Ret	Ret		12	10	Ret	0
20	(Sweden) Ronnie Brandt				Ret							16	0
21	(Sweden) Andreas Simonsen					11							0
22	(Sweden) Tobias Tegelby				13								0
23	(Sweden) Mikael Eklund							14					0

Colour	Result
Gold	Winner
Silver	Second place
Bronze	Third place
Green	Points classification
Blue	Non-points classification
Blue	Non-classified finish (NC)
Purple	Retired, not classified (Ret)
Red	Did not qualify (DNQ)
Red	Did not pre-qualify (DNPQ)
Black	Disqualified (DSQ)
White	Did not start (DNS)
White	Withdrew (WD)
White	Race cancelled (C)
Blank	Did not practice (DNP)
Blank	Did not arrive (DNA)
Blank	Excluded (EX)

=== Teams' championship ===
Pos	Team	Pts
1	West Coast Racing / BMW Dealer Team	108
2	Flash Engineering	96
3	Honda Racing	78
4	Volvo Olsbergs Green Racing	60
5	Chevrolet Motorsport Sweden	26
6	IPS Motorsport	19
7	MA:GP / Alfa Romeo	17
8	Nordic Fine Art	14
9	Elgh Motorsport	7
10	KMS - Kristofferson Motorsport	4

=== Manufacturers' championship ===
Pos	Manufactures	Pts
1	BMW	139
2	Honda	93
3	Volvo	72
4	Chevrolet	38
5	Peugeot	24
6	Alfa Romeo	22
7	Seat	20
8	Audi	17

=== Semcon Cup ===
Pos	Driver	Team	Pts
1	Tobias Johansson	MB Sport	98
2	Dick Sahlén	Team Caliber	84
3	Viktor Huggare	Huggare Racing	36
4	Joakim Ahlberg	BMS Event	33
5	Mikael Eklund	Team Nya Åkeriet Örebro	5
6	Tobias Tegelby	Tysslinge Racing	5
7	Ronnie Brandt	Brandt Racing	4
