= Dick Sahlén =

Swedish race car driver

- Nationality: Swedish
- Born: Dick Stefan Christoffer Sahlén; November 10, 1986 (age 39) Stockholm (Sweden)

Scandinavian Touring Car Championship career
- Debut season: 2008
- Current team: Mattias Ekström Juniorteam
- Former teams: Team CaWalli, Team Caliber
- Wins: 1
- Poles: 2

Dick Stefan Christoffer Sahlén (born 10 November 1986 in Stockholm) is a Swedish auto racing driver who has competed in the Scandinavian Touring Car Championship for Mattias Ekström Juniorteam.
