= Mantorp Park =

Motor racing track in Östergötland, Sweden

- Long Circuit (1997–present)
- Location: Mantorp, Mjölby Municipality, Sweden
- Coordinates: 58°22′19″N 15°16′58″E
- FIA Grade: 3
- Broke ground: 1968
- Opened: 31 August 1969; 57 years ago
- Architect: Lars Olof Larsson
- Major events: Current: PCC Scandinavia (2004–present); Future: STCC (1996–2022, 2024, 2027); Former: GT4 Scandinavia (2019–2021, 2023); ETRC (1986–1997); European F2 (1971–1973, 1981–1982); European F3 (1976); ETCC (1973)
- Website: http://www.mantorppark.com/

Long Circuit (1997–present)
- Length: 3.106 km (1.930 mi)
- Turns: 13
- Race lap record: 1:14.337 ( (Sweden) Kevin Kleveros, Tatuus FR2000, 2010, FR 2.0)

Short Circuit (1997–present)
- Length: 1.868 km (1.161 mi)
- Turns: 8
- Race lap record: 0:47.102 ( (Sweden) Thed Björk, Volvo S60 TTA, 2015, Silhouette racing car)

Long Circuit (1981–1996)
- Length: 3.125 km (1.942 mi)
- Turns: 11
- Race lap record: 1:10.940 ( (Venezuela) Johnny Cecotto, March 822, 1982, F2)

Full Circuit (1969–1980)
- Length: 4.098 km (2.546 mi)
- Turns: 9
- Race lap record: 1:24.000 ( (France) Patrick Depailler, Alpine A367, 1973, F2)

Mantorp Park is a 3.106 km (1.930 mi) motor racing circuit located in Mantorp, Sweden, about 50 km (31 mi) west of Linköping. The circuit was built in 1969 with finance from BP Sweden as a permanent road course and a dragstrip. Mantorp Park is capable of four different layouts, but today only the short and long tracks are used.

The European Formula Two Championship visited from 1971 until 1973, and again in 1981 and 1982. Today it mainly hosts club events, dragracing, a driving school and rounds of the Swedish Formula Three Championship and the Scandinavian Touring Car Championship.

Mantorp Park was the first European drag racing circuit to adopt the new 300 m (1,000 ft) drag strip format adopted by the NHRA in July 2008.

== Lap records ==
As of September 2025, the fastest official race lap records at the Mantorp Park are listed as:

Category	Time	Driver	Vehicle	Event
Long Circuit (1997–present): 3.106 km (1.930 mi)
Formula Renault 2.0	1:14.337	Kevin Kleveros	Tatuus FR2000	2010 Mantorp Park Formula Renault 2.0 Sweden round
Formula Three	1:14.720	Joachim Johnsen	Dallara F398	2000 Mantorp Park Nordic F3 round
Porsche Carrera Cup	1:15.183	Daniel Roos	Porsche 911 (992 I) GT3 Cup	2025 Mantorp Park Porsche Carrera Cup Scandinavia round
GT3	1:16.540	Daniel Roos	Audi R8 LMS GT3	2013 2nd Mantorp Park Swedish GT round
Silhouette racing car	1:17.034	Richard Göransson (Note: Both drivers took the same lap time in different rounds.); Thed Björk	Volvo S60 TTA	2013 Mantorp Park STCC round 2014 Mantorp Park STCC round
GT4	1:17.767	Philipp Frommenwiler	Porsche 718 Cayman GT4 RS Clubsport	2025 Mantorp Park Porsche Sprint Challenge Scandinavia round
GT1 (GTS)	1:17.954	Magnus Wallinder	Chrysler Viper GTS-R	2002 2nd Mantorp Park Swedish GTR round
Super Touring	1:19.042	Roberto Colciago	Audi A4 Quattro	2002 2nd Mantorp Park STCC round
Formula Renault 1.6	1:19.351	Martin Rump	Signatech FR1.6	2013 Mantorp Park Formula Renault 1.6 Nordic round
GT	1:19.708	Mats Lindén	Porsche 911 (996) GT3-RS	2001 2nd Mantorp Park Swedish GTR round
GT2	1:20.133	Lennart Pehrson	Porsche 911 (993) GT2	1999 2nd Mantorp Park Swedish GTR round
TCR Touring Car	1:20.264	Tobias Brink	Audi RS 3 LMS TCR (2017)	2019 Mantorp Park TCR STCC round
Super 2000	1:21.153	Robin Rudholm	BMW 320si	2008 2nd Mantorp Park STCC round
NXT Gen Cup	1:32.306	Lennart Wolf	LRT NXT1	2025 Mantorp Park NXT Gen Cup Swedish Junior Championship
Short Circuit (1997–present): 1.868 km (1.161 mi)
Silhouette racing car	0:47.102	Thed Björk	Volvo S60 TTA	2015 Mantorp Park STCC round
Trans-Am	0:48.903	Lennart Bohlin	Chevrolet Camaro	2000 1st Mantorp Park Swedish GTR round
Super Touring	0:49.129	Tommy Rustad	Nissan Primera Mk3 GT	2000 1st Mantorp Park STCC round
GT2	0:49.266	Lennart Pehrson	Porsche 911 (993) GT2	1999 1st Mantorp Park Swedish GTR round
GT1 (GTS)	0:49.575	Henrik Roos	Chrysler Viper GTS-R	2000 1st Mantorp Park Swedish GTR round
GT	0:49.598	Fredrik Sundberg	Porsche 911 (996) GT3-R	2000 1st Mantorp Park Swedish GTR round
Long Circuit (1981–1996): 3.125 km (1.942 mi)
Formula Two	1:10.940	Johnny Cecotto	March 822	1982 Mantorp Park F2 round
Super Touring	1:24.670	Jan Nilsson	Volvo 850 GLT	1996 Mantorp Park STCC round
Full Circuit: 4.098 km (1969–1980)
Formula Two	1:24.000	Patrick Depailler	Alpine A367	1973 Mantorp Park F2 round
Group 6	1:28.200	Chris Craft	Porsche 908/02	1969 Mantorp Park Nordic Challenge Cup round
Formula Three	1:29.100	Riccardo Patrese	Chevron B34	1976 Mantorp Park F3 round
Group 2	1:35.700	Rune Tobiasson	BMW 3.0 CSL	1974 Mantorp Park STCC round
Group 4	1:40.800	Bengt Ekberg	Porsche 911 Carrera RSR	1973 Mantorp Park STCC round
Group 3	1:45.900	Bengt Ekberg	Porsche 911 S	1972 Mantorp Park SSCC round

== Gallery ==
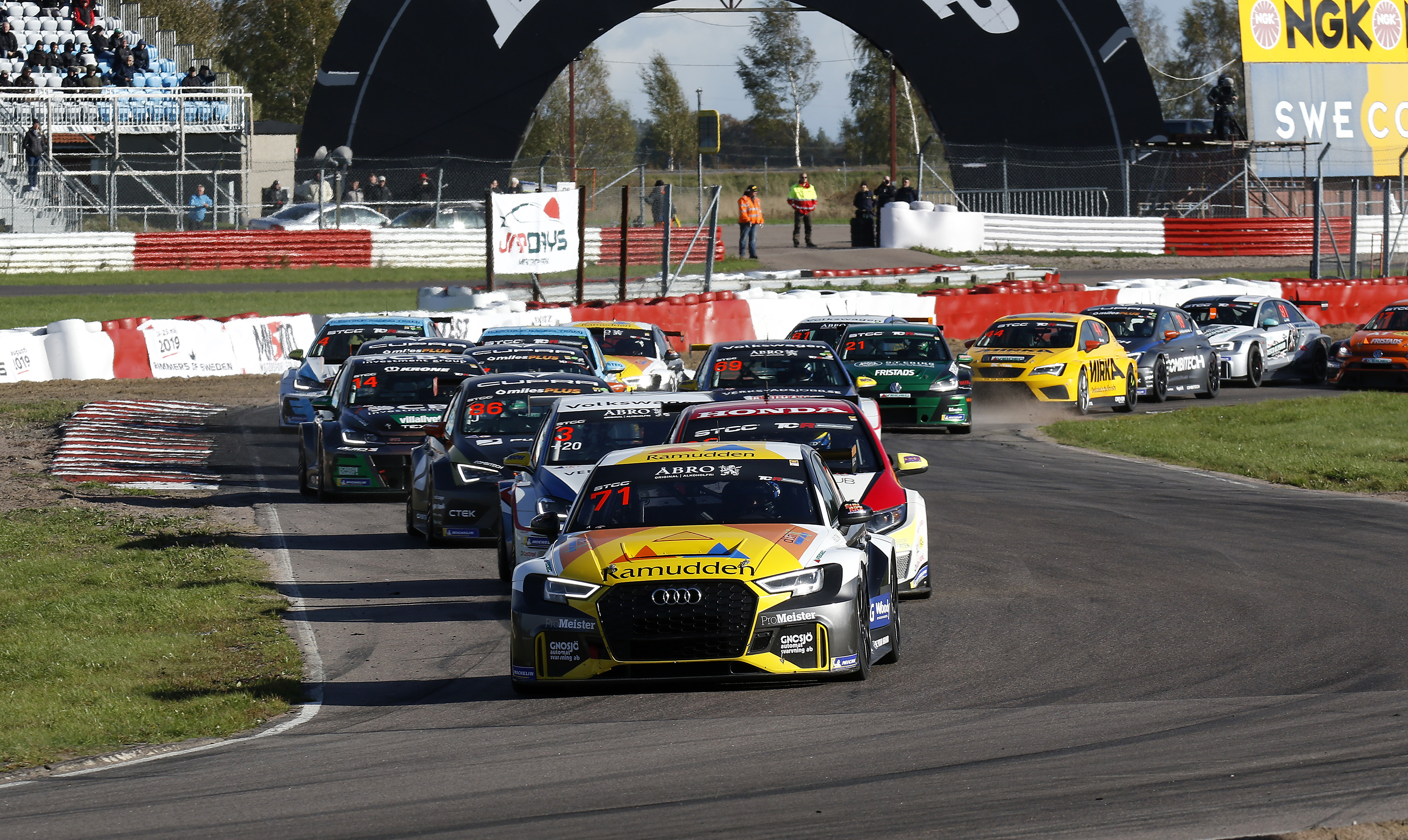
Scandinavian Touring Car Championship race

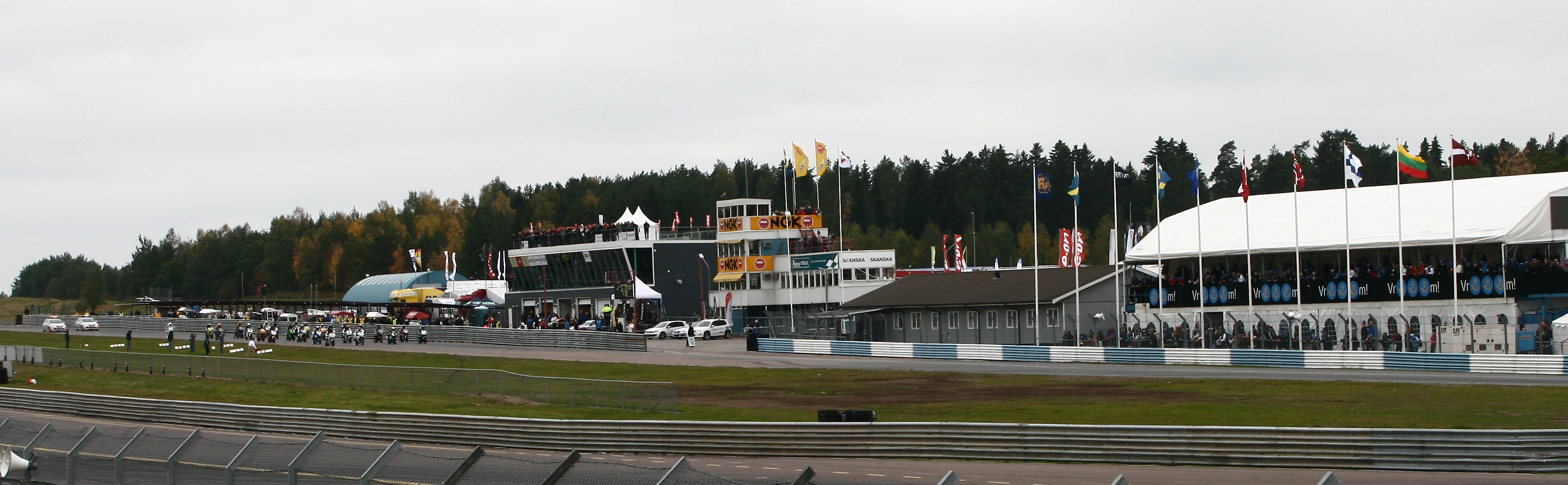
Motorcycle race start

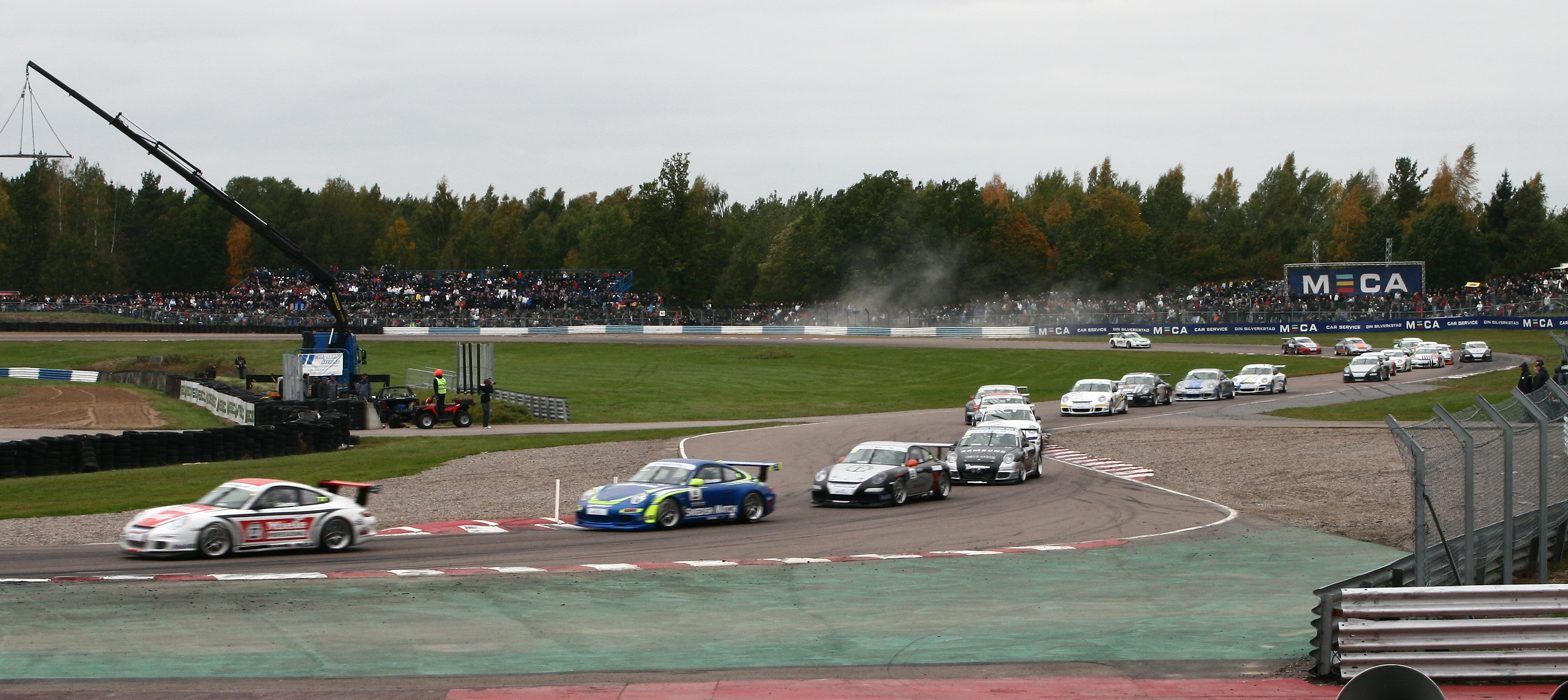
Porsche Cup race

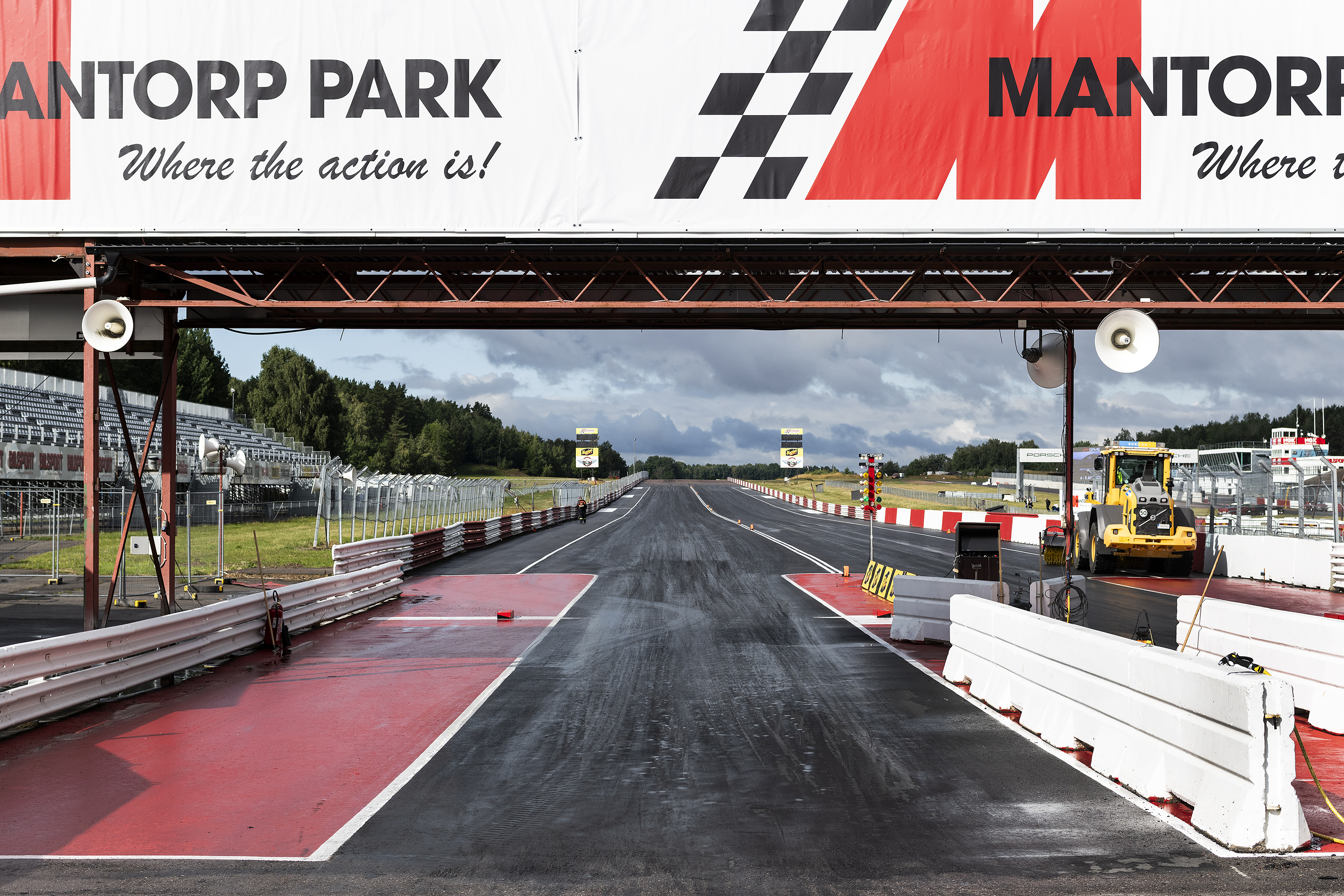
Dragstrip

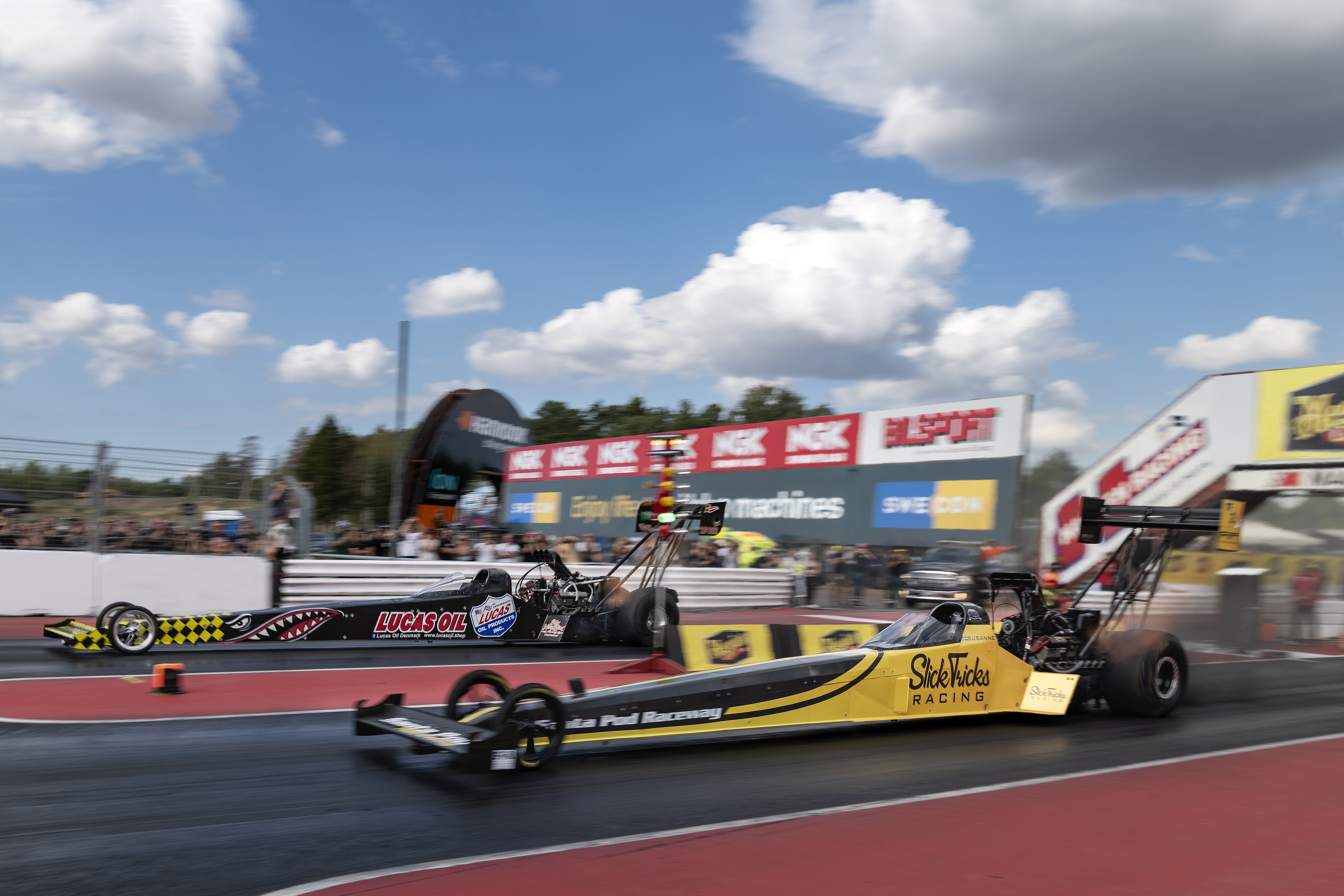
Top Fuel race
