= Vålerbanen =

Motor racing circuit in Braskereidfoss, Norway

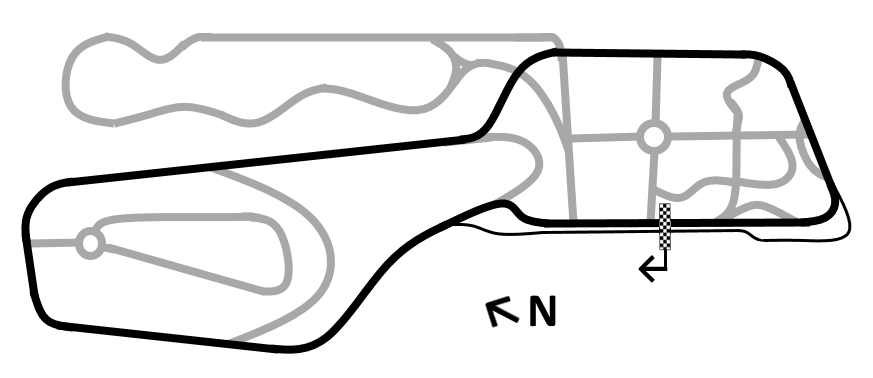
- Full Circuit (1997–present)
- Location: Våler, Norway
- Coordinates: 60°42′12″N 11°48′38″E
- Operator: NAF Trafikksenter AS
- Opened: 1993
- Major events: Current: NBF GT Championship; Former: STCC (2005–2009); PCC Scandinavia (2005–2009); NTCC (1997–1998, 2002–2004)

Full Circuit (1997–present)
- Length: 2.350 km (1.460 mi)
- Turns: 10
- Race lap record: 0:52.952 ( (Norway) Joakim Ottersen, Opel Vectra GTS V8 DTM, 2015, DTM)

Original Circuit (1993–present)
- Length: 1.416 km (0.880 mi)
- Turns: 5

Vålerbanen is a race track located in the village of Braskereidfoss in Våler Municipality in Innlandet county, Norway. It is a part of Norsk Trafikksenter and is also used for driving practice by driver's license students, in particular driving under special conditions such as on icy roads. Among the more popular events hosted at Vålerbanen are the annual Gatebil event and Norway's largest amateur racing event and sports car display, Classic & Sportscar Meeting. On 14 September 2008, the track hosted the tenth race of the 2008 Swedish Touring Car Championship season.

Although not as technically demanding as Rudskogen, it is significantly faster and allows better chances for overtaking.

For the 2008 season, a newly built 1.2-kilometer (0.75 mi) track section was added. Although not usable for racing, it is regularly used for trackday meets and driving practice.

== Facilities ==
- 2.35-kilometer (1.46 mi) circular track
- 2.0-kilometer (1.24 mi) off-road track for four-wheeled vehicles
- 800-meter (0.50 mi) outdoor go-kart track
- 3 skidpans (straight line, curve and downhill)

== Lap records ==
As of September 2015, the fastest official race lap records at the Vålerbanen are listed as:

Category	Time	Driver	Vehicle	Event
Full Circuit (1997–present): 2.350 km (1.460 mi)
DTM	0:52.952	Joakim Ottersen	Opel Vectra GTS V8 DTM	2015 3rd Vålerbanen NBF GT round
Porsche Carrera Cup	0:55.291	David Björk	Porsche 911 (997 I) GT3 Cup	2008 Vålerbanen Porsche Carrera Cup Scandinavia round
Super 2000	0.56.192	Robert Dahlgren	Volvo C30	2008 Vålerbanen STCC round
Super Touring	0.56.629	Jarle Gåsland	Vauxhall Vectra	2002 1st Vålerbanen NTCC round
