= ITCC =

ITCC may refer to:

- Irish Touring Car Championship
- Italian Touring Car Championship
- 1996 International Touring Car Championship
- International T-Class Confederation
- International Theological Correspondence College
