= Robert Savage =

Robert Savage or variants may refer to:

- Robert Savage (executive) (1934–2023), president and chief executive of American Express
- Robert Savage (MP), Member of Parliament (MP) for City of York
- Robbie Savage (born 1974), Welsh international football player and pundit
- Robbie Savage (footballer, born 1960), English football player
- Robbie Savage (football fan) (1967–2017), former mascot of the Namibian national football team
- Robert Savage (Australian politician) (1895–1959), member of the New South Wales Legislative Council
- Ted Savage (footballer) (1912–?), full name Robert Edward Savage, English footballer who played for Liverpool F.C.
- Robert Savage (cricketer) (born 1960), former English cricketer
- R. J. G. Savage (1927–1998), British palaeontologist
- Bob Savage (1921–2013), American baseball player
- Robert Savage (racing driver), Irish racing driver
