= PTCC =

PTCC may refer to:

- Philippine Touring Car Championship, a competition in the Philippines
- Pine Technical College, a college in the United States
- Pingtung County Council, a council in Taiwan
