= NCMI =

NCMI may refer to:

- National Center for Medical Intelligence, an agency within the Defense Intelligence Agency (DIA) of the United States Department of Defense (DoD)
- National CineMedia, a media company that produces pre-show entertainment for cinemas
- New Covenant Ministries International, a Christian apostolic-prophetic network
