= Touring car racing =

Motorsport road racing competition

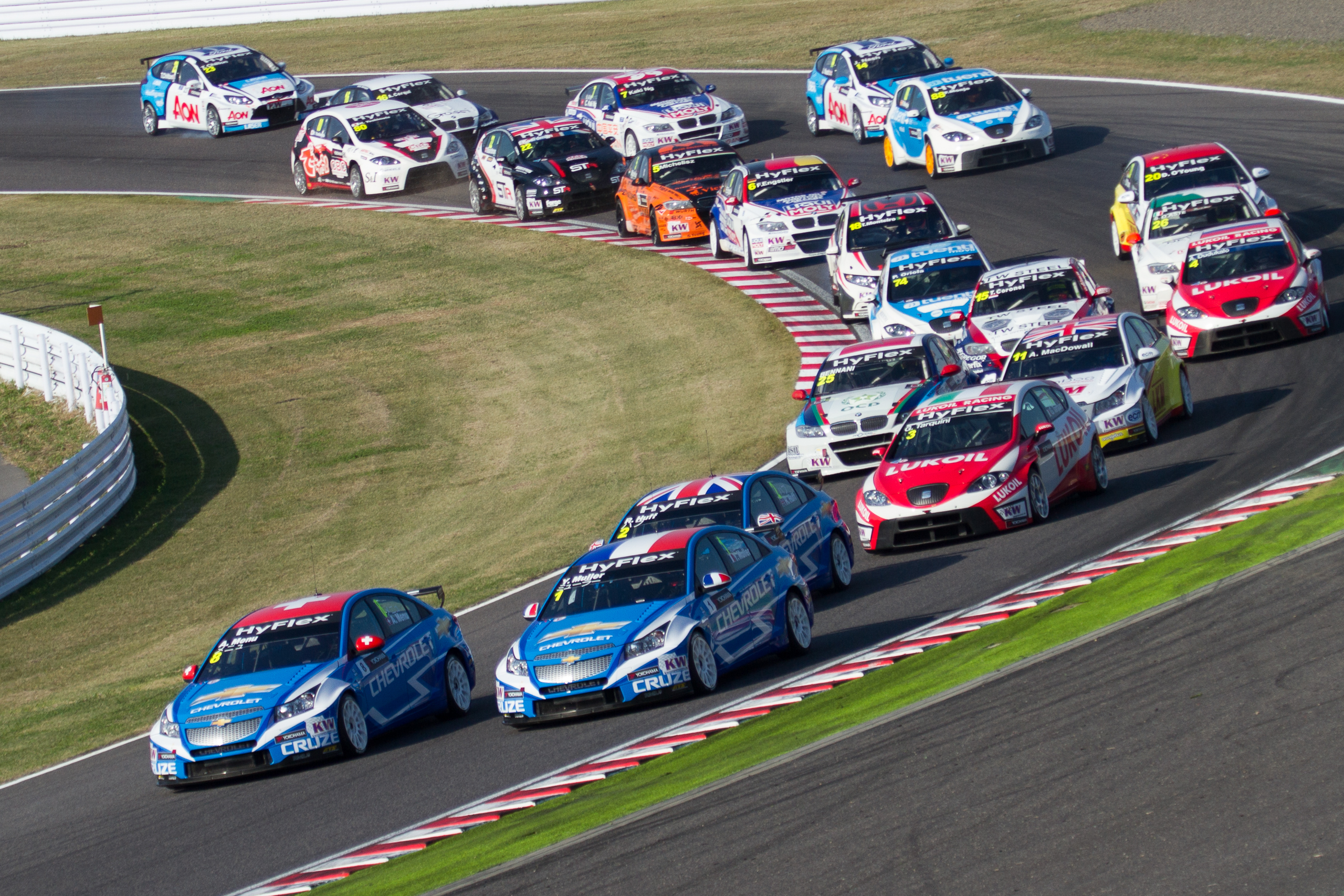
- Highest governing body: FIA

Characteristics
- Contact: Yes
- Team members: Yes
- Mixed-sex: Yes
- Type: Circuit racing, road racing
- Venue: Race track, street circuit

Touring car racing is a form of motorsport racing featuring production cars, modified for competition. The discipline emphasizes close racing, balanced performance, and manufacturer diversity, with cars that still resemble their road-going counterparts. Originating in Europe in the mid-20th century, touring car racing has since expanded globally through rule sets such as Group A, Super Touring, and the FIA TCR formula. Major championships include the Deutsche Tourenwagen Masters (DTM), British Touring Car Championship (BTCC) and Supercars Championship. It has both similarities to and significant differences from stock car racing, which is popular in the United States.

While the cars are not as fast as those in formula or sports car races, their similarity both to one another and to fans' own vehicles makes for well-supported racing. The lesser use of aerodynamics means following cars have a much easier time passing than in open-wheel racing, and the more substantial bodies of the cars makes the subtle bumping and nudging for overtaking much more acceptable.

As well as short sprint races, many touring car series include one or more endurance races, which last from 3 to 24 hours and are tests of reliability and pit crews as much as speed and consistency.

== Characteristics ==
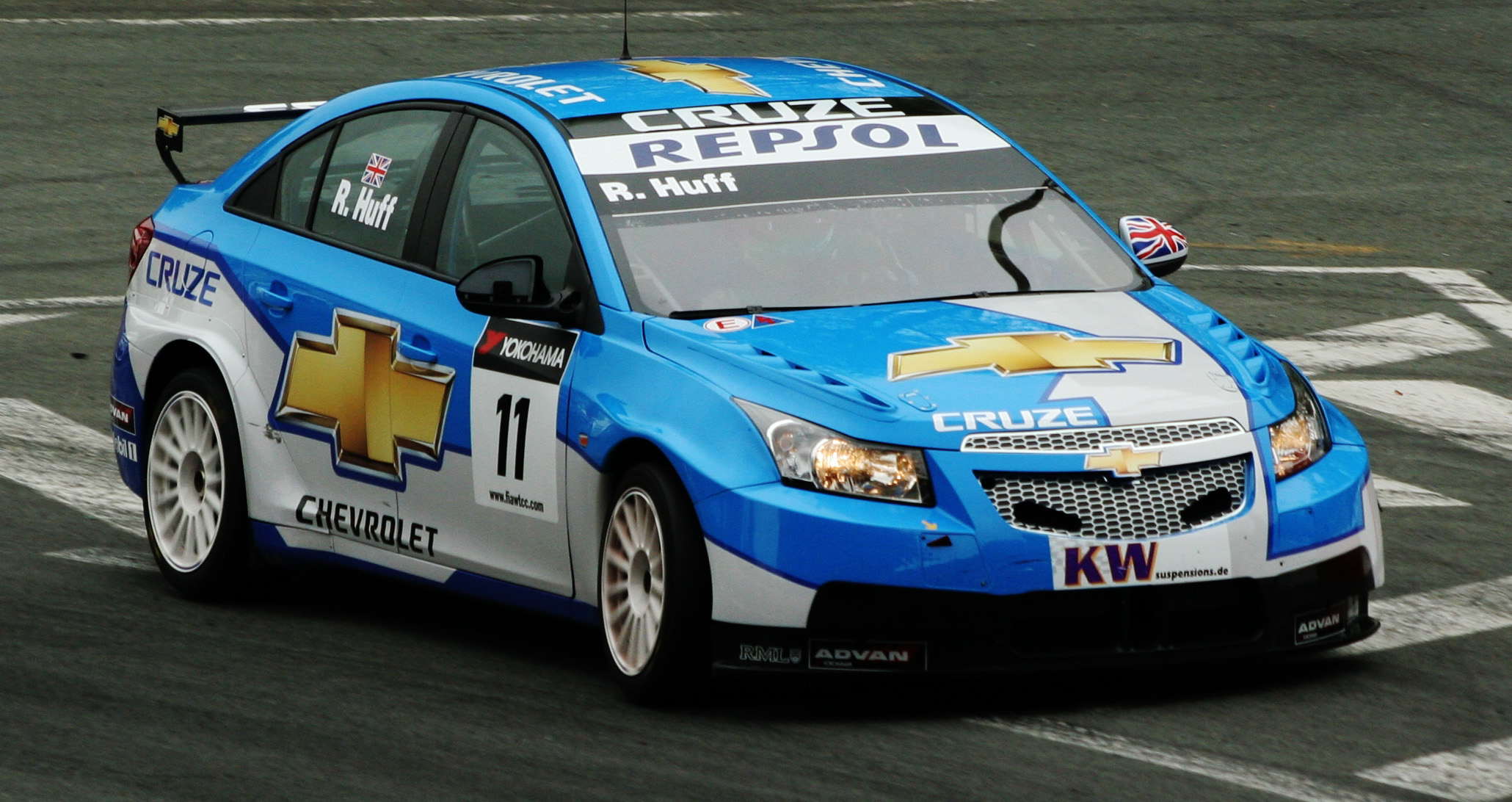
A Chevrolet Cruze touring car

Touring car racing started in the mid twentieth century as a long-format style of competition that took place on public roads between numerous towns. The cars were crewed by a driver and, because of their unreliability, a mechanic who carried tools and spares. The legacy of these beginnings can still be seen in modern touring and GT cars – the driver sits offset from the centreline of the car and there is space for a second seat (although they are rarely fitted any more).

While rules vary from country to country and series to series, most series require that the competitors start with a standard car body, but virtually every other component may be allowed to be heavily modified for racing, including engines, suspension, brakes, wheels and tires. Aerodynamic aids are sometimes added to the front and rear of the cars. Regulations are usually designed to limit costs by banning some of the more exotic technologies available (for instance, many series insist on a control tire that all competitors must use) and keep the racing close (sometimes by ballast weight where winning a race requires the winner's car to be heavier for subsequent races).

Touring cars share some similarity with American stock car racing. Touring cars are, at least notionally, derived from production cars as most stock car racing outside of NASCAR, including street stock and late model racing, continue to be. NASCAR circuits have since moved to a custom platform independent of production cars, unlike touring car circuits. Touring car racing is also referred to as saloon car racing.

== Series of competition ==
=== FIA TCR World Tour ===
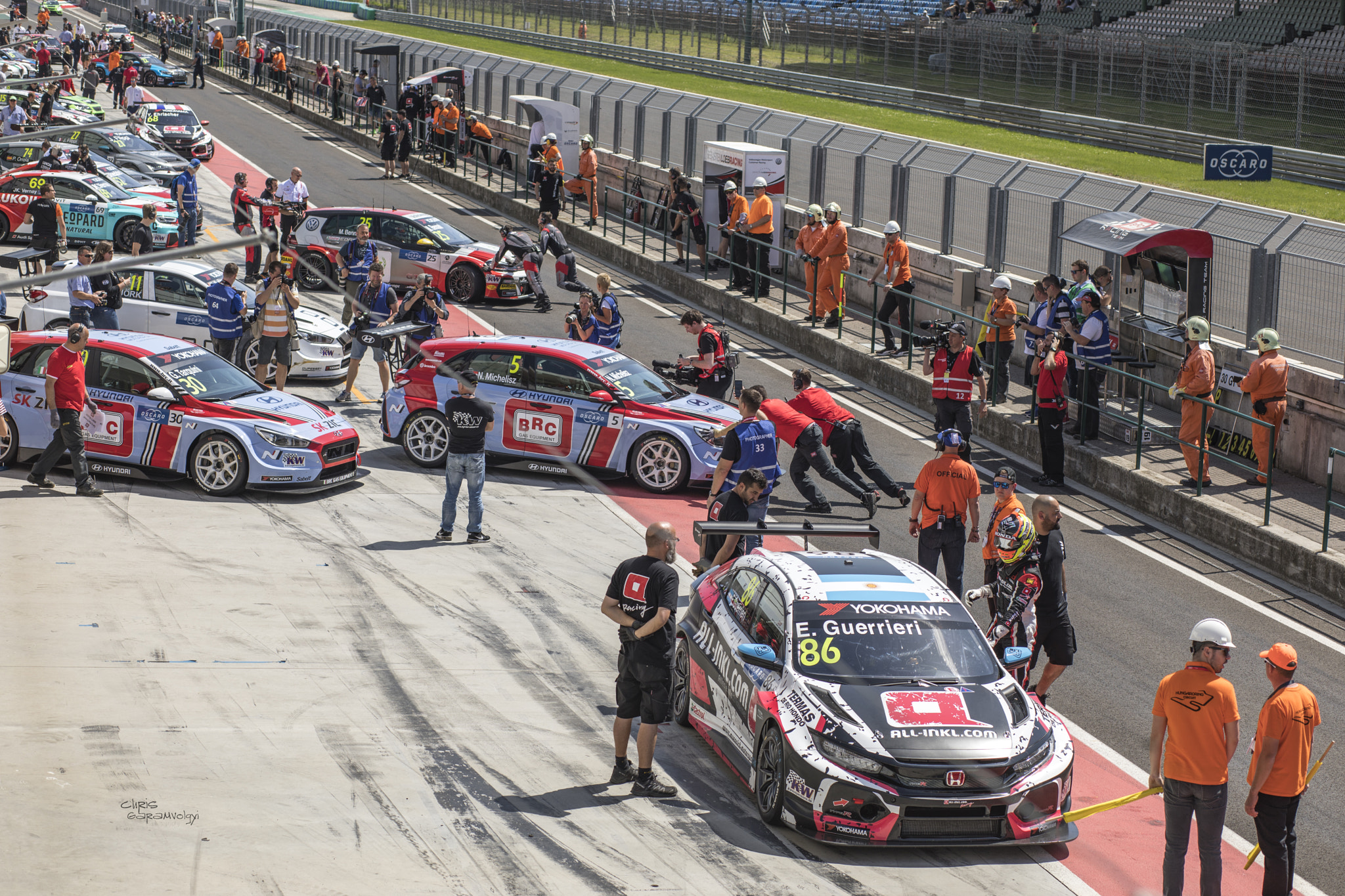
2018 WTCR Race of Hungary

Worldwide

Modern World Touring Car Championship (WTCC) started in 2005, evolving from the reborn European Touring Car Championship. The series merged with the TCR International Series and became the World Touring Car Cup (WTCR) starting from 2018. In 2023, the WTCR was replaced by the TCR World Tour.

Running at major international racing facilities, this series is supported by BMW, SEAT and Chevrolet. The latter fields a works team, whereas the other two only sell racing kits to be installed on their cars, providing technical support to their customers. In 2011, Volvo also entered the championship, fielding a one-car team as an evaluation for a possible heavier commitment to the series. The World Touring Car Championship features 1.6-litre cars built to Super 2000 regulations based on FIA Group N.

Following the trend of recent FIA rules, cost control is a major theme in the technical regulation. In 2011 the rules concerning the engine capacity have changed, switching from 2000 cc to 1600 cc turbo engines. Cars equipped with the old 2000 cc engines are still eligible in the championship. Many technologies that have featured in production cars are not allowed, for example: variable valve timing, variable intake geometry, ABS braking and traction control.

=== British Touring Car Championship ===
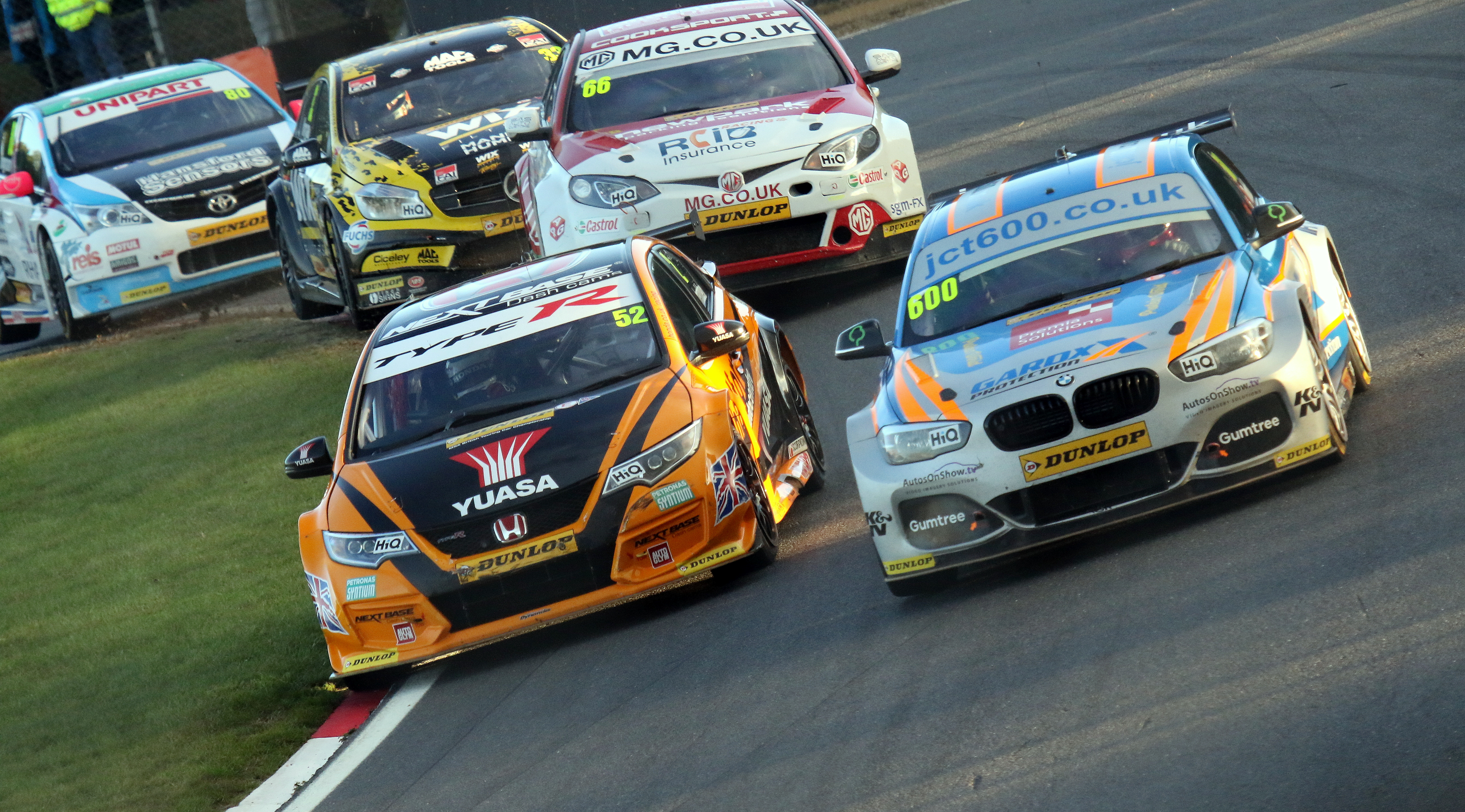
2016 BTCC Brands Hatch

United Kingdom

The British Touring Car Championship (BTCC) currently competes at nine circuits in the UK with cars built to Next Generation Touring Car specification, with ballast being used to equalise performance. From 2011, cars that ran to the BTCC's own Next Generation Touring Car specification were eligible to compete in a phased move away from Super 2000 regulations. Cars are 2.0-litre saloons, station wagons and hatchbacks with over 350 bhp (260 kW) and can be front or rear-wheel drive. During the 2016 season manufacturer team entries came from BMW, Subaru, MG, and Honda. Since BTCC budgets have been kept relatively low, there is a strong independent and privateer presence in the championship. Manufacturers represented by privateers include Vauxhall, Ford, Toyota, Volkswagen, Chevrolet, and Audi.

Prior to 2001 the BTCC was contested by cars built to 2.0-litre supertouring regulations and had in its heyday up to nine different manufacturers. Joachim Winkelhock stated on several occasions that it was the best touring car championship in the world, and many champions of that era now race in the World Touring Car Championship (WTCC). Between 2002 and 2006 the BTCC ran its own Touring class with Super Production/Super 2000 cars making up the numbers; the Touring class was phased out (only privateers are eligible to run old Touring cars) with the intention of a pure Super 2000 series. The introduction of the Next Generation Touring Car specification, from 2011, started a phased transition from Super 2000 cars in an effort to cut costs and improve the sport.

=== DTM ===
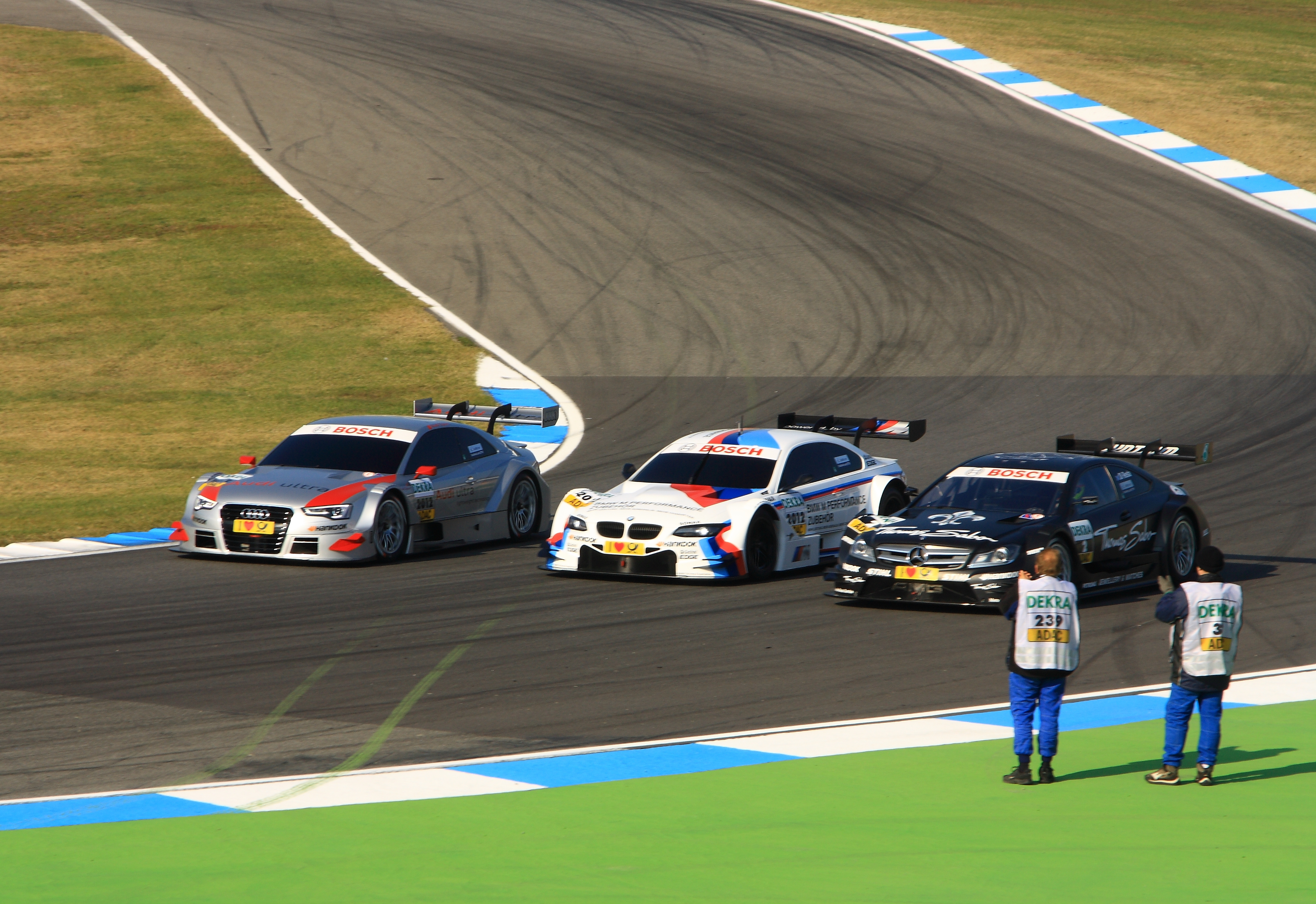
DTM at Hockenheim in 2012

Germany/Europe

The DTM series, the initials standing for Deutsche Tourenwagen Meisterschaft until 1996, then following a hiatus, revived as Deutsche Tourenwagen Masters in 2000, features advanced purpose built 2.0-litre four-cylinder turbo-powered space frame machines, covered with largely carbon fibre bodyshapes resembling the manufacturers' road machine (although the roof and roof pillars do originate from the production car). In order to lower costs, the engine power is limited to 610 hp (450 kW), and transmissions, brakes and tyres (Hankook) are standard parts for all. Also, dimensions and aerodynamics are equalised. The approx. 985 kg (2,172 lb) (without driver) DTM cars corner incredibly quickly and wear spectacular bodykits incorporating huge wheel arches and diffusers, plus a drag-reduction system (DRS) designed to encourage overtaking.

More than 20 works-backed entries of the Opel Astra, Audi TT and Mercedes-Benz CLK contested the revived 2000 DTM series but a serious issue developed for the series when Opel pulled out ahead of the 2006 season. BMW would eventually replace Opel as the series' third manufacturer for 2012, while Mercedes-AMG withdrew at the end of 2018. Mercedes-AMG was replaced by a privately funded Aston Martin Vantage program that did not last beyond the 2019 season.

For the 2019 season, major technical changes occurred. Turbochargers were reintroduced in accordance with new regulations impacting engines and power outputs, as all cars are now required to have 2.0-litre 4-cylinder single turbo engines, replacing the 4.0L V8s that had been used since the series' revival in 2000. Engine power was increased from ~500 hp to 610 hp, with an extra 30 hp available as part of a push-to-pass system available to drivers for the first time. Downforce levels were also reduced to encourage overtaking and increase top speeds to 300 km/h (186 mph) in order to improve the racing spectacle.

In 2019, DTM formed a partnership with the Japanese sports car series Super GT which runs a near identical set of rules and regulations in its GT500 class. Honda, Toyota – represented via Lexus, and Nissan each entered a wildcard entry for the final race of the 2019 season at the Hockenheimring. The cars entered were a Nissan GT-R (R35), a Lexus LC 500 and a Honda NSX. For the weekend of the 22nd-24 November, DTM sent three BMW M4s and four Audi RS5s to take part in a non-championship race at Fuji Speedway along with the full GT500 grid, labelled the 'SUPER GT x DTM Dream Race'. Aston Martin withdrew from the event as they intended to focus on developing the Vantage package for 2020, however this never eventuated as the program was ended.

Audi announced in late April 2020 that they would be discontinuing their involvement in the series after the end of the 2020 season, following the same path Mercedes-Benz did after the end of the 2018 season; focusing on electric motorsport, most notably Formula E. This will leave BMW as the sole manufacturer left, putting the series' future in serious jeopardy.

=== Nürburgring NLS Endurance Racing Series ===
Germany

Since 1997, and nowadays still on the over 20 kilometres (12 mi) long famous old Nürburgring and other circuits worldwide, in average over 150 touring cars compete in the NLS series of ten typically four-hour-long races. Cars range from old 100 hp (75 kW) road legal compacts to 500 hp (370 kW) Porsche 996 and even modified DTM cars (1,250 kg (2,760 lb)). Most entrants of the 24 Hours Nürburgring collect experience here.

=== Scandinavian Touring Car Championship ===
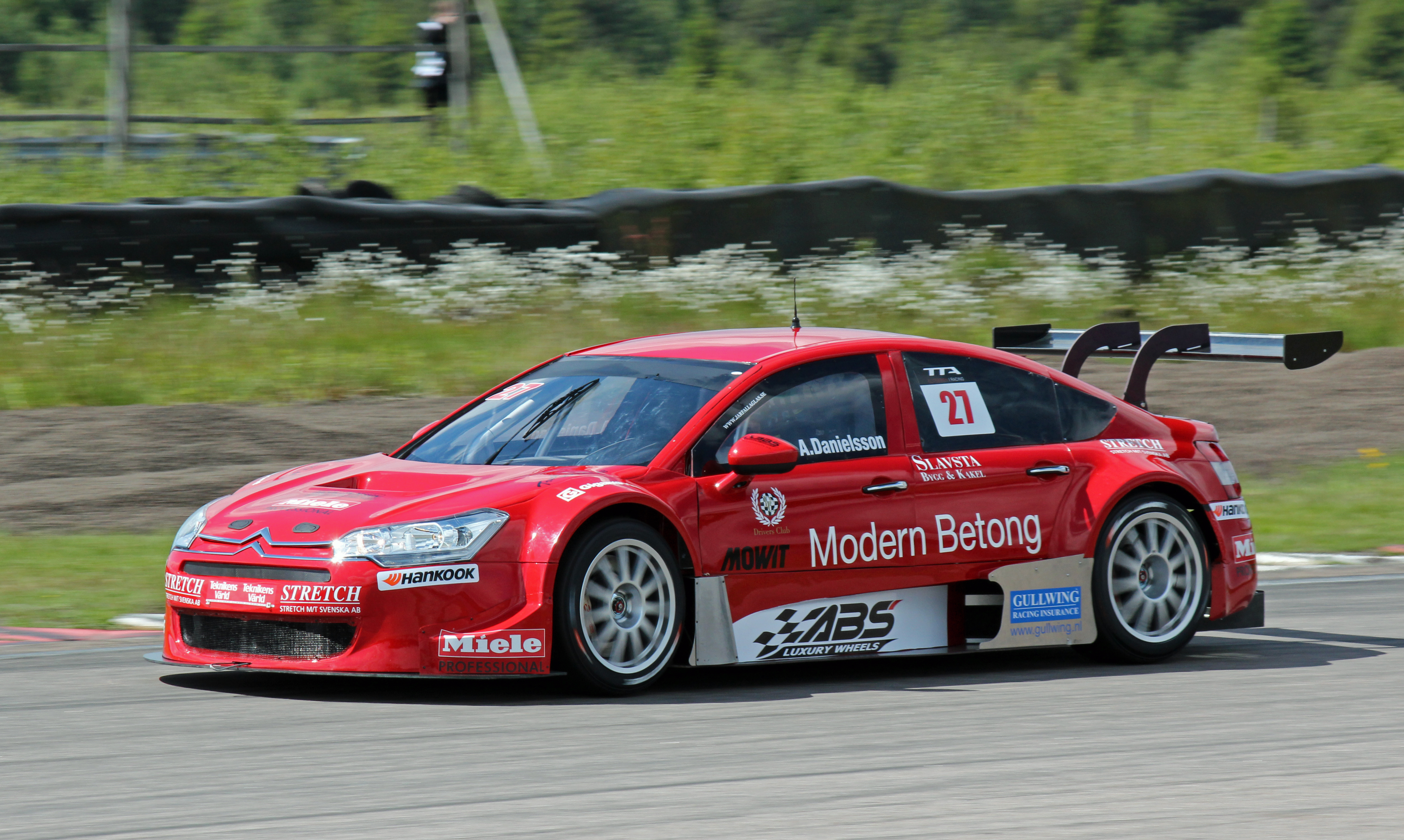
Alx Danielsson driving a Citroën in the STCC – Racing Elite League

Sweden/Denmark

Between 1996 and 2010 the Swedish Touring Car Championship contained various races in Sweden and a few in Denmark. The most successful car makes were Volvo, BMW, Audi, and Nissan. In 2010 the championship merged with the Danish Touringcar Championship to form the Scandinavian Touring Car Championship. The 2010 champion was Robert Dahlgren, because he had achieved the best results from selected races in the Danish and Swedish championships. Rickard Rydell and Johan Kristoffersson won the championship in 2011 and 2012, in a Chevrolet and a VW, respectively. In 2013 the series merged with the TTA – Racing Elite League to form the 2013 STCC – Racing Elite League season, starring 17 drivers for Volvo, BMW, Saab, Citroën, Dacia, and Honda.

=== Supercars Championship ===
Australia and New Zealand

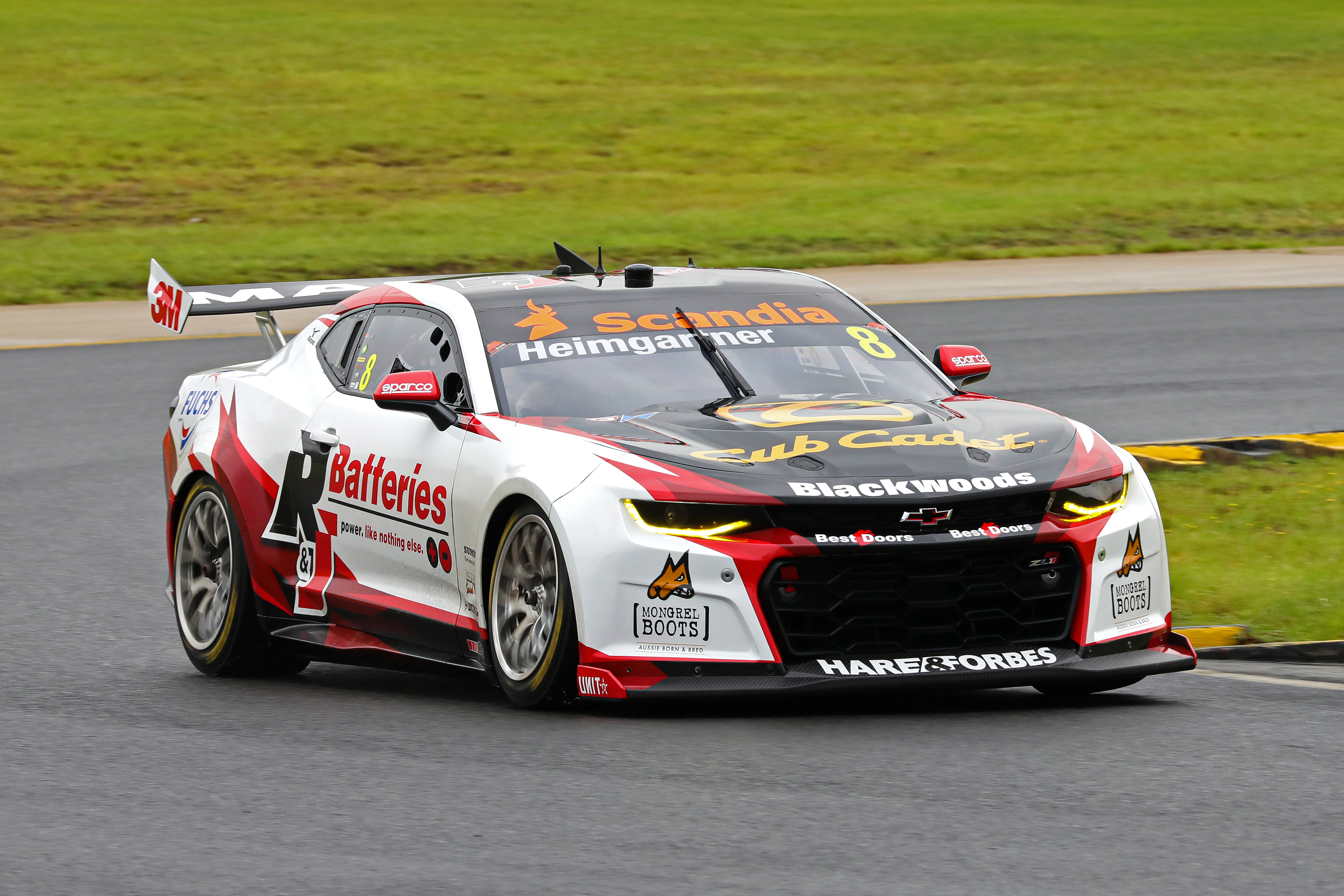

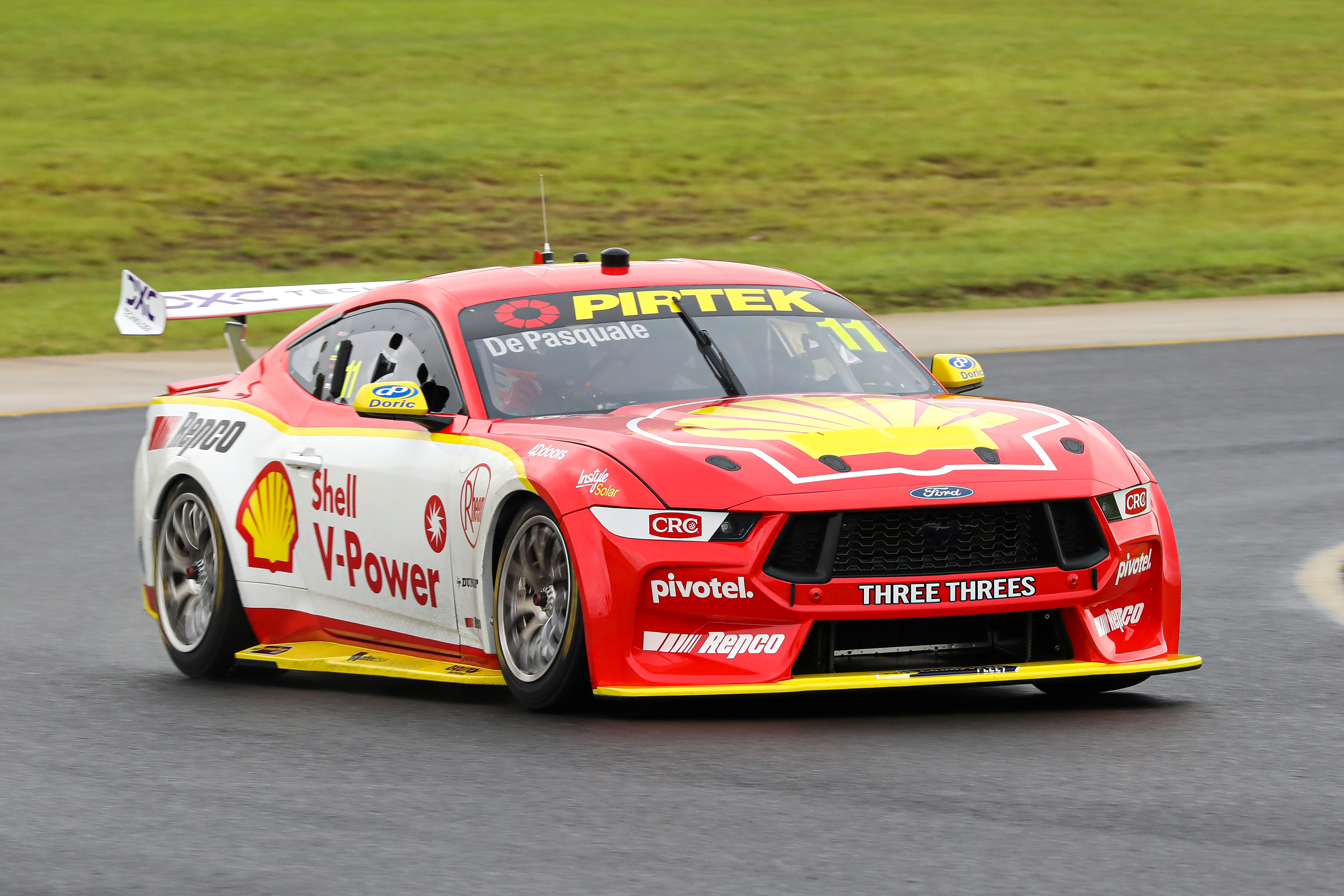
Gen3 regulation Supercars used since 2023.

Formerly the Australian Touring Car Championship, Supercars are recognised internationally as the 'fastest touring cars in the world' racing at speeds that can reach nearly 300 km/h. They are also the most expensive touring cars in the world with each car costing in excess of $1 million (AUD) which includes bespoke $250,000 (AUD) 5.0-litre V8 engines producing approximately 635 hp (473 kW). The current formula was devised in 1993 (based on Group A regulations) and branded as 'V8 Supercars' in 1997 and 'Supercars' in 2016. The series features grids of approximately 25 cars, although selected events feature wildcard entries which add to the grid. The cars are currently based on the Ford Mustang GT and Holden Commodore (ZB) The minimum weight for a Supercar including driver is 1,395 kg (3,075 lb). The Commodore will be replaced by a Chevrolet Camaro in 2022. The race cars themselves are derived from production body panels and space frame chassis. Both body styles feature an aerodynamic package incorporating large front and rear wings designed to ensure equal aerodynamic performance between the two vehicle types.

The series incorporates the world famous Bathurst 1000 race as a championship round. Because of the longer distance, regulations require two drivers per car for this race. This also applies to The Bend 500 & the Gold Coast 600. These events make up the Pirtek Enduro Cup, which is a championship-within-a-championship where the driver combination with most points collected over these three endurance races wins a trophy.

In Australia, Supercars enjoys a strong support base that is still driven in large part by the tribal Ford versus Holden battle. Over 200,000 total spectators attend the four-day Adelaide 500 and Bathurst 1000 events, and the 2019 Bathurst 1000 drew a maximum of 2.36 million television viewers across the country. This compares favourably with other major sporting events such as the AFL Grand Final with 2.2 million TV viewers in 2019. Supercars is also popular in New Zealand, with a regular round formerly held in the country (previously held at Pukekohe) being the only international event on the series calendar. Attempts at further international expansion were made in China, Malaysia, the Middle East, and the United States during the 2000s and 2010s, none of which have survived.

As the series has grown, major international motorsport organisations have become involved such as Team Penske, Andretti Autosport, United Autosports and Triple Eight Race Engineering.

Both Ford and Holden financially and technically supported their favoured teams and took an active role in promotion of the series from its beginning, but began to wind back and ultimately withdraw their financial commitments approximately in line with the decline in sales and eventual discontinuation of the Falcon in 2016 and Commodore in 2020 (the two models that exclusively competed in the V8 formula from 1993 to 2012). Ford withdrew all financial support after 2015, and Holden cut most of its support back to only the Red Bull Holden Racing Team from 2017. Holden was shut down as a brand during 2020, ending its factory involvement in Supercars after the 2020 season, while Ford returned for the 2019 season with the Mustang project. The Commodore will be replaced with a Chevrolet Camaro, which will be sold in Australia by General Motors Specialty Vehicles.

Other manufacturers have also appeared in the series, including Nissan with Kelly Racing, Volvo with Garry Rogers Motorsport, and Mercedes-Benz in a non-factory-supported program from Erebus Motorsport. With Kelly Racing's switch to Ford Mustangs for 2020 after a year of running its Nissan Altimas privately, Supercars reverted to a two-make Ford vs. Holden competition.

== Other series ==
=== Americas ===
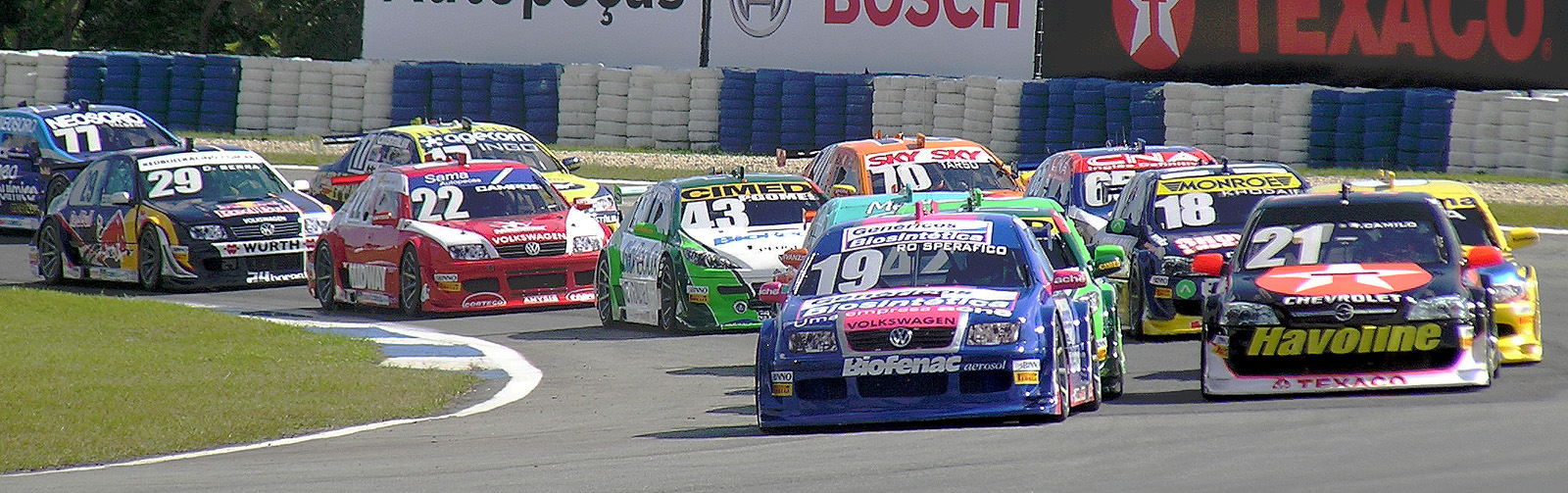
Stock Car Brasil in 2007 at Curitiba

- (Argentina) TC 2000 Championship (1979–present)
- (United States) TC America Series – during the SpeedVision/Speed Channel era, the "touring cars" in this series were lower-performance vehicles modified to almost the same extent as the American Le Mans Series and Rolex Sports Car Series caliber grand touring cars. After the touring cars became a BMW–Mazda–Acura affair, the series was reformatted to include a new touring car class mostly sharing Grand Am's Continental Tire Sports Car Challenge vehicles. Shortly later, a lesser B-Spec group was added. After acquisition by SRO, TC America was separated from World Challenge.
- (Canada) Canadian Touring Car Championship (2007–present)
- Costa Rica Touring Car Championship
- (Dominican Republic) CDCC Dominican National Championship
- (United States) U.S. Touring Car Championship
- (United States) Continental Tire Sports Car Challenge (1997–present) – features both a sports-car-based grand sport class and a touring-car-based street tuner class
- (Brazil) Stock Car Brasil (1979–present, link)
- TCR Brazil Touring Car Championship
- (United States) American Touring Car Championship (2009–present)
- (Brazil) Copa Petrobras de Marcas (link)

=== Europe ===
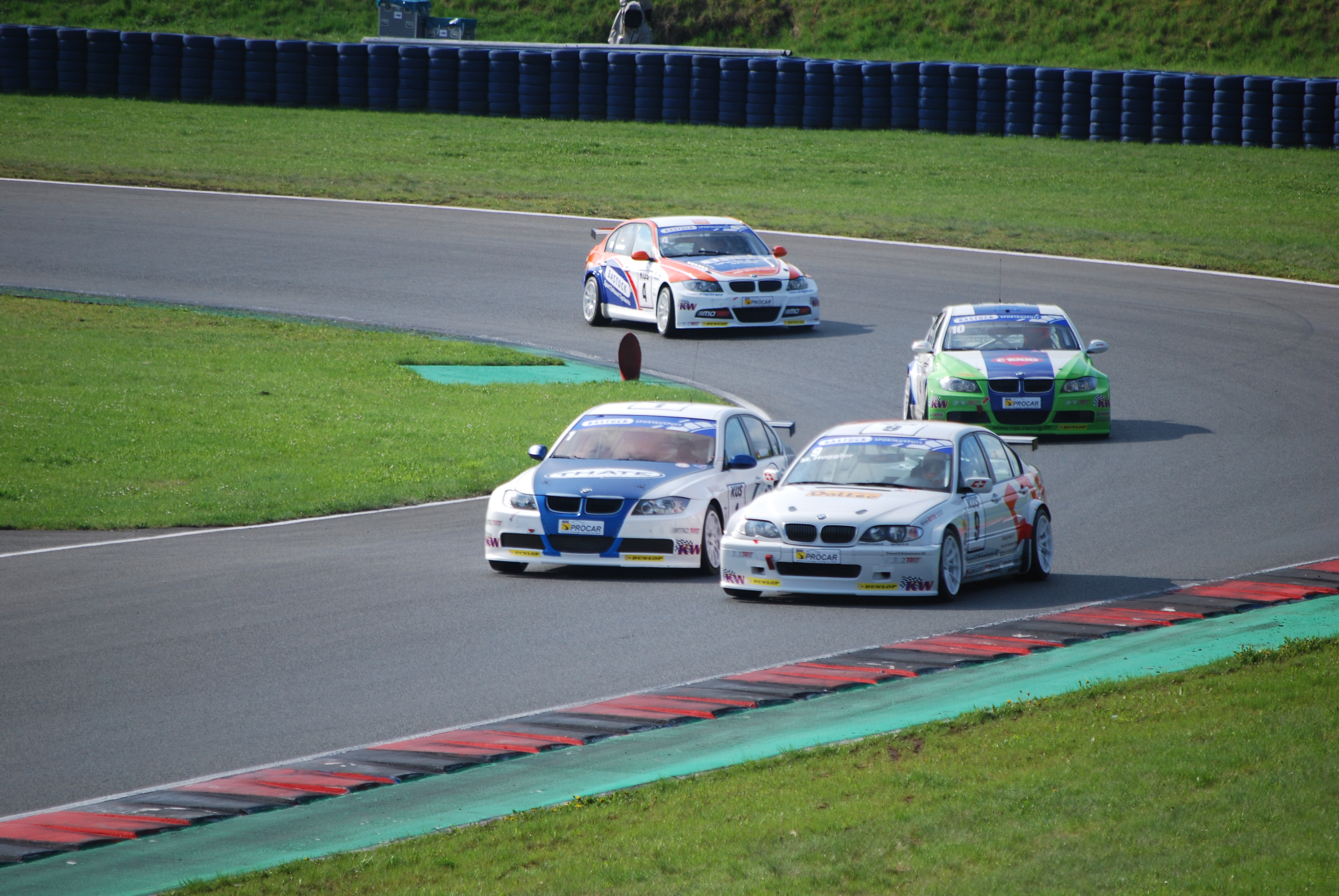
A Division 1 class during an ADAC Procar Series race in 2013

- ADAC Procar Series (Germany), formerly DMSB-Produktionswagen-Meisterschaft (DPM) with ETCC rules (1995–2017)
- (France) Renault Eurocup Mégane Trophy
- (European Union) European Touring Car Cup, held at various European circuits since 2005
- (Estonia) (Latvia) (Lithuania) Baltic Touring Car Championship
- (Finland) Finnish Touring Car Championship (1987–present)
- (Republic of Ireland) Irish Touring Car Championship
- (Portugal) Portuguese Touring Car Championship
- (Russia) Russian Touring Car Championship
- Cruze Cup (One-make series)

=== Asia-Pacific ===
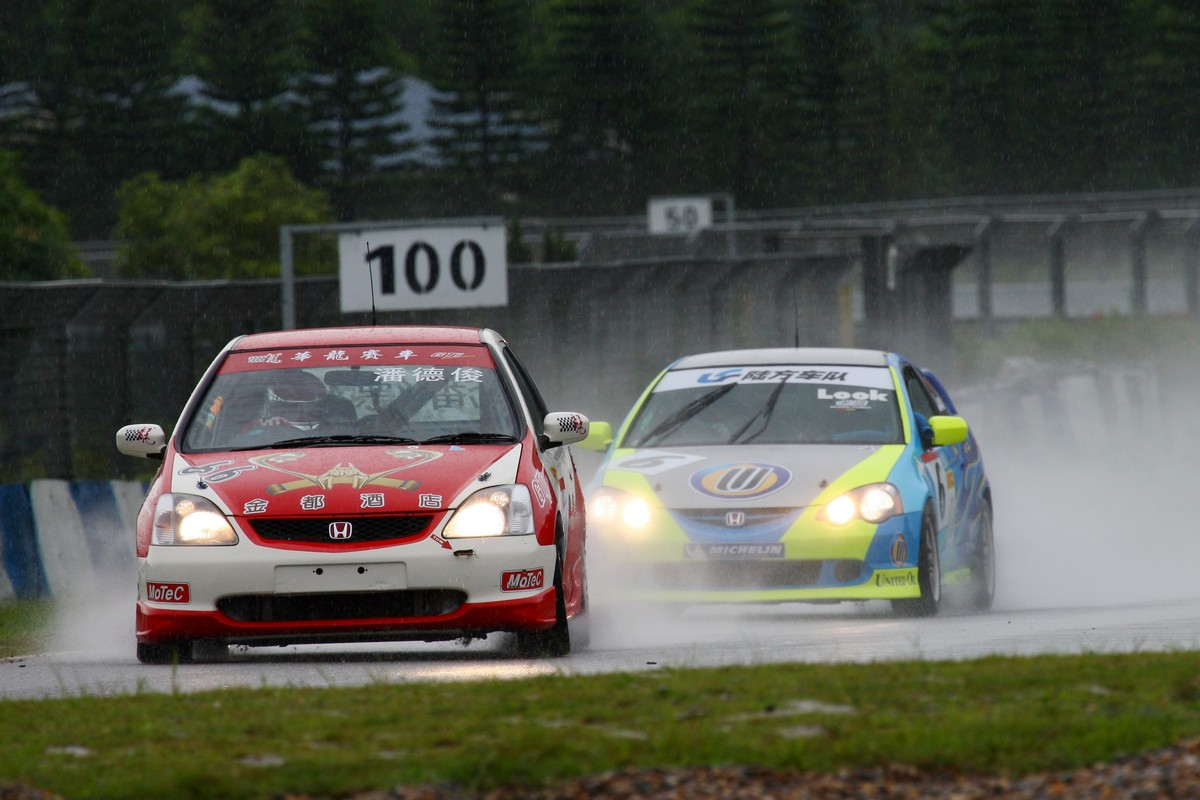
Paul Poon Civic during 2008 Hong Kong Touring Car Championship season

- (Japan) Super GT (1993–present)
- Hong Kong Touring Car Championship (2002–present)
- (Philippines) Philippine Touring Car Championship (formerly the PNTCC)
- China Touring Car Championship
- Macau Touring Car Championship (? –present)
- Malaysia Championship Series (2014–present)
- Thailand Super Series (2013–present)
- (New Zealand) NZ Touring Cars
- (Australia) Super2 Series (2000–present)
- (Australia) Super3 Series (2008–2025), link
- (Australia) Touring Car Masters (2007-present)
- Saturday Night Fever Challenge Series – Malaysia (Club Event Series)
- Volkswagen Vento Cup India (2011–present)

=== Africa ===
- (South Africa) South African Touring Cars (2016–present)

=== Former series ===
- The old World Touring Car Championship, plagued by lack of support from the FIA, raced under the Group A regulations in 1987.
- Germany's former [[DTC]] adopted ETCC rules in 2004 and was renamed to DMSB-Produktionswagen-Meisterschaft (DPM) until 2005
- Asian Touring Car Championship (2000–2002, 2005–2011)
- Benelux Racing League 2004–2009
- Belgian Touring Car Series, last season in 2011.
- Australian Super Touring Championship ran from 1993 to 2001.
- Japanese Touring Car Championship (JTCC) ran from 1994 through 1998.
- Super Tourenwagen Cup (STW) ran from 1994 through 1999.
- North American Touring Car Championship (NATCC) ran from 1996 to 1997.

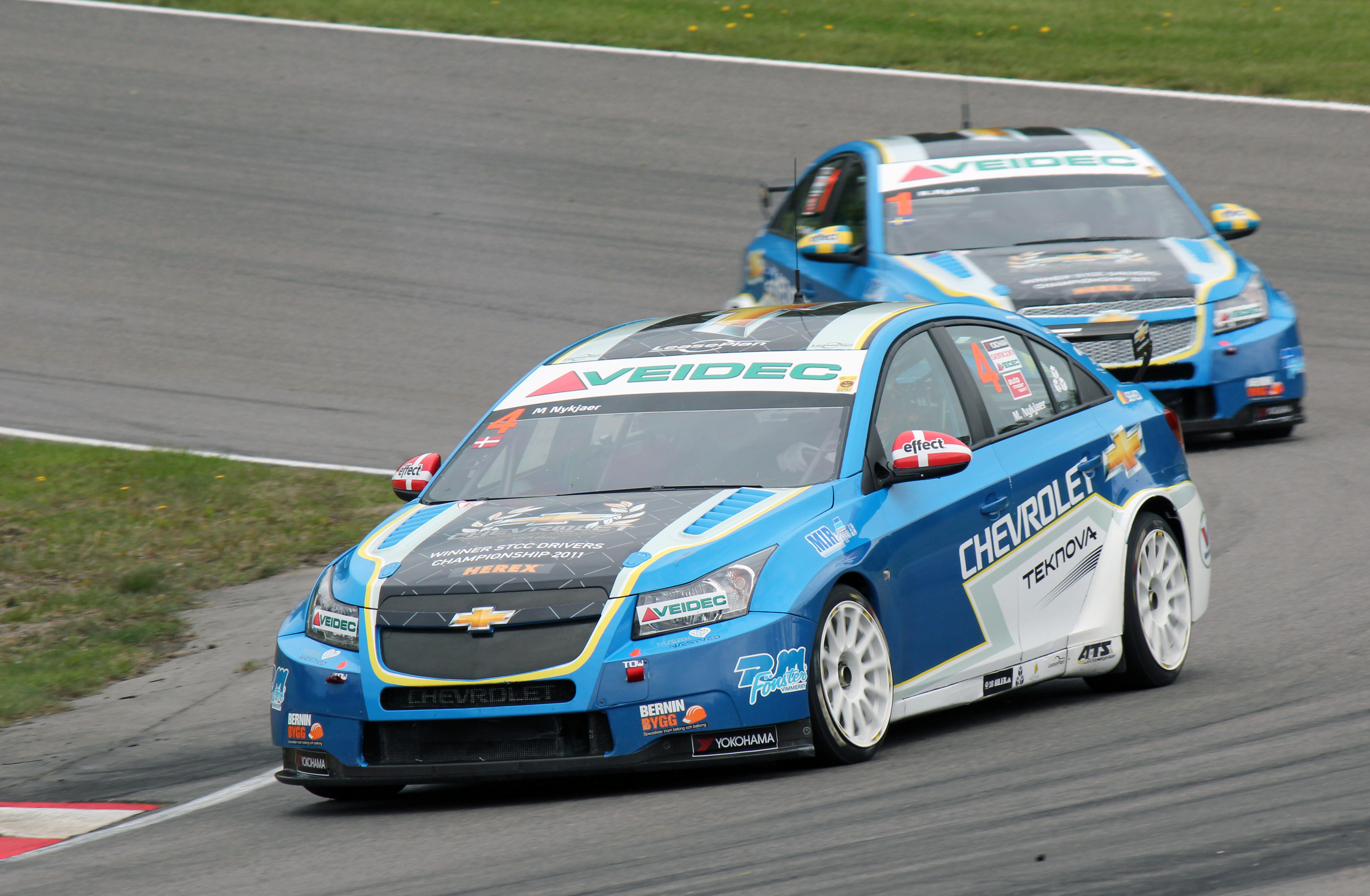
Scandinavian Touring Car Championship 2012

- Swedish Touring Car Championship (1996–2010)
- South American Super Touring Car Championship ran from 1997 through 2000.
- Norwegian Touring Car Championship
- Danish Touring Car Championship (1999–2010)
- Italian Superturismo Championship (1987–1999, 2003–2008)
- Superstars Series (2004–2013)
- French Supertouring Championship (Championnat de France de Supertourisme), last season in 2005
- Campeonato Español de Turismos (Spanish Touring Car Championship) ran from 1959 to 1998.
- Bankfin Touring Car Championship (South African Touring Car Championship) which ended in 2000.
- Deutsche Tourenwagen Meisterschaft (1984–1994) then turned to ITCC by the FIA in 1995, based in heavily modified cars, began to be too expensive and due to retirement from Opel and Alfa Romeo the ITCC series were cancelled in 1996.
- V8Star Series
- New Zealand V8s (1994–2015)
- V8SuperTourer

=== Famous races ===
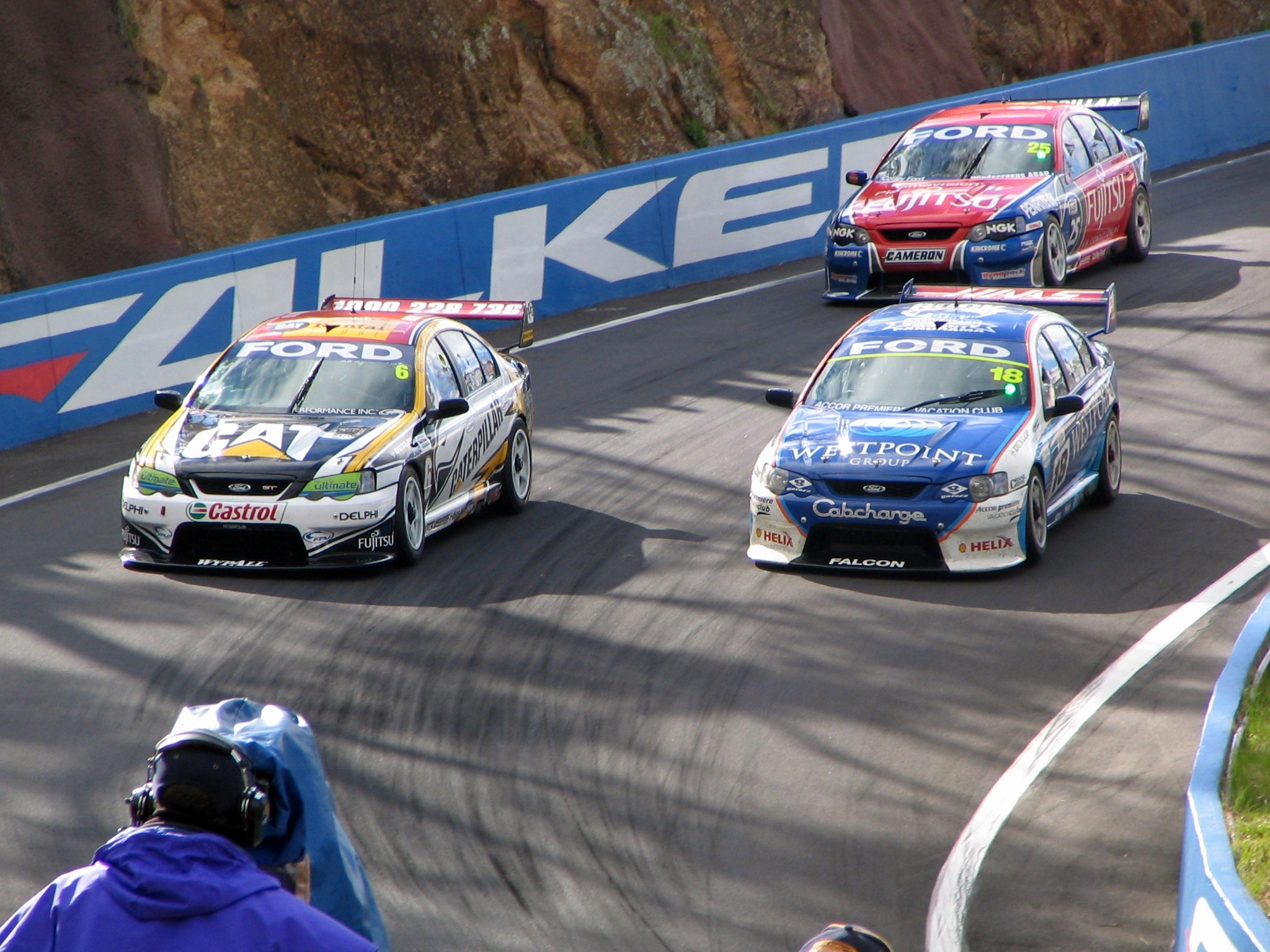
The 2005 Bathurst 1000

- Bathurst 1000 held at Mount Panorama Circuit since 1963, part of the Supercars Championship (the race was held at Phillip Island from 1960 to 1962)
- Norisring Trophy held at the Norisring for the Deutsche Tourenwagen Masters
- Spa 24 Hours since 1924–1989
- 24 Hours Nürburgring at the famous old Nürburgring, since 1970, related to VLN series there
- Macau Grand Prix Guia Race (contested as part of WTCC since 2005)
- Tourist Trophy held until 1988
- Wellington 500, held at the Wellington street circuit between 1985 and 1996
- InterTEC (インターTEC), held at Fuji Speedway as part of the JTCC round through the series duration until the series' demise in 1998
- Cascavel de Ouro, held at Autódromo Internacional de Cascavel, since 1967
- 200 km de Buenos Aires (TC2000 Championship), held at Autódromo Oscar y Juan Gálvez, since 2004

== Rule sets ==
Different sets of regulations do apply:

- Contemporary touring car racing: Class 1 · Group A · Group F · Group G · Group H · Group N · Group S · Group SE · Group SP · Next Generation Touring Car · Super 2000 · TCR Touring Car · Group Rally4 · Group Rally5
- Historic touring car racing: Group 1 · Group 2 · Group 3 · Group 4 · Group 5 · Group B · Supertouring

== See also ==
- Production car racing
- Stock car racing
- Sports Car Racing
- Endurance Racing
- Gentlemen Drivers
- List of current Motorsport Championships
- List of TCR Series
- Group 1
- Group 2
- Group A
- Group N
- Class 1 Touring
- Super 2000
- Diesel 2000
- Super Touring
- BTC Touring
- Next Generation Touring Car
- TCR Touring Car
