= Irish Touring Car Championship =

- Category: Touring cars
- Country: (Republic of Ireland) Ireland
- Inaugural season: 2010
- Tyre suppliers: Yokohama
- Drivers' champion: Ciaran Denver (2019)
- Official website: itcc.ie

The Irish Touring Car Championship (ITCC) is a touring car racing series held each year in Ireland. It was established in 2010.

== History ==
The Irish Touring Car Championship was formed in 2010 by Brian Sexton, Barry Rabbitt and Philip Burdock as a replacement for the Saloon Libre class which had been run by Mondello Park. The series was designed to bring together drivers from various backgrounds, such as other touring car series and time-attack and track day competitors.

== Race regulation and format ==
ITCC Classes
Class	bhp per tonne
Class A	320
Class B	250
Class C	210

The series season consists of 5-6 events, each of which is made up of two rounds. Events are held at Mondello Park, using the International and National Circuits, Bishopscourt Racing Circuit in Northern Ireland. The series has previously held races at the Kirkistown Circuit, also in Northern Ireland, and at the Anglesey Circuit in Wales.

The ITCC series is open to any modified car as long as it is based on a four seater production vehicle. Since the inception the participating classes were divided into Super Touring, Super Touring 2.0 and Touring classes. From the 2019 season the classes were redefined based on power to weight ratio into A, B and C. ITCC is attractive in a way that there are little restrictions on what engine can be fitted or how it may be modified. The air intake and fuel systems, ECU and tyres are all free from restrictions.

From 2021? season, the Production class race in regularity race format, where the barrier lap time is set for each circuit. Penalties apply for exceeding the barrier time - demotion to end of the grid during the qualifying, and 3s time penalty for each time barrier time is exceeded during the race. Production class barrier time for Mondello National Track was 1.04.50, and for Mondello International Track was 2.02.00.

== List of champions ==
Season	Super Touring / Class A	Super Touring 2.0 / Class B	Touring / Class C
2010	Martin Tracey	Stephen Maher (Rookie)	—N/a
2011	Martin Tracey	—N/a	—N/a
2012	Phil Brennan	—N/a	John Greaney
2013	Erik Holstein	Norman Fawcett	Andrew Twomey
2014	Dave O'Brien	Eoghan Fogarty	Jason Hughes
2015	Eoghan Fogarty	Robert Savage	Grzegorz Kalinecki
2016	Grzegorz Kalinecki	—N/a	Jay O'Reilly
2017	Shane Rabbitt	—N/a	Pa Hudson
2018	Philip Burdock	—N/a	—N/a
2019	Ciaran Denver	Keith Campbell	Daniel Faherty
2020	not held due to COVID-19 pandemic		

Season	Super Touring	Production
2021	Ulick Burke	Stephen Martin
2022	ongoing	

== Series lap records ==
As of 2021

Racetrack	Driver	Car	Lap record (m:s:ms)
Mondello Park (National)	Dave O'Brien	BMW M3	0:59:098
Mondello Park (International)	Erik Holstein	BMW M3	1:50:052
Kirkistown Circuit	Erik Holstein	BMW M3	1:00:004
Bishopscourt Racing Circuit (National)	Erik Holstein	BMW M3	1:13:753
Bishopscourt Racing Circuit (International)	Eoghan Fogarty	BMW M3	1:35:111
Anglesey Circuit	Martin Tracey	RS500	1:15:266
Phoenix Park Track	Phil Brennan	BMW M3	1:14:229
