= Robert Savage (racing driver) =

Irish racing driver

Robert Savage is a racing driver from County Meath, Ireland.

In 2015 Robert won Irish Touring Cars Championship in Super Touring 2.0 class.
