= Robert Savage (executive) =

American businessman

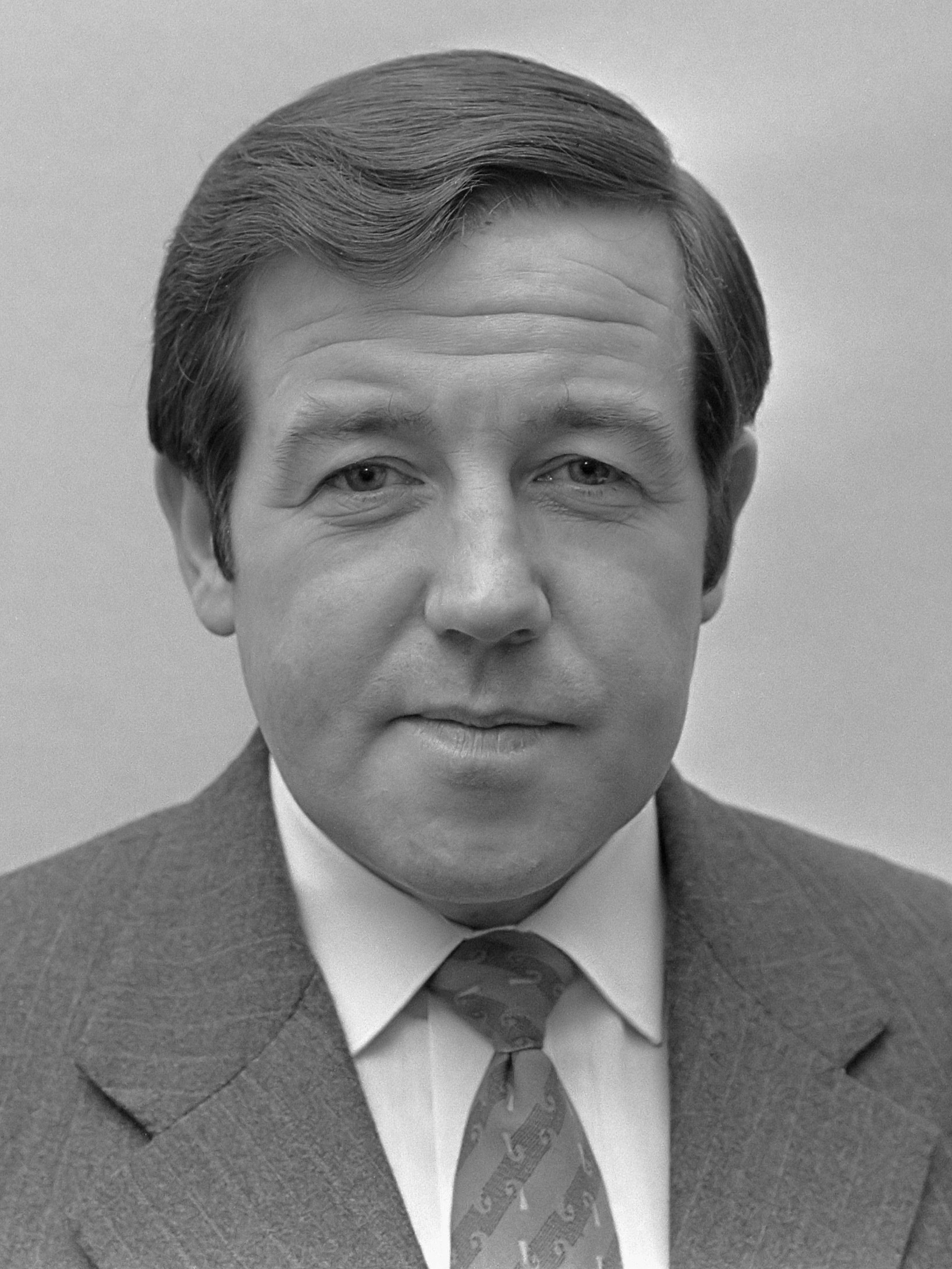
Robert Savage (1972)

Robert A. Savage (January 5, 1934 – November 4, 2023) was a president and chief executive of American Express Bank, becoming chairman in 1991. He joined American Express in 1965 from Barclays Bank, where he was deputy chief trader of foreign currency. He was born in London, and he was among the "Blitz Babies" evacuated from London during The Blitz. He received an MBA from Harvard Business School in 1975.

He was also a past member of the Foreign Exchange Committee. During the Edmond Safra affair of the 1980s, he was part of a management group led by Bob Smith which was close to buying the Trade Development Bank and American Express Bank for $600 million. The bank's largest clients had been approached, and they were convinced they could swing a deal. Confidence was so high even a press release was being written up in anticipation of an announcement until then Chairman Jim Robinson inexplicably changed his mind.

Savage died at his home on Hilton Head Island, South Carolina on November 4, 2023.
