= Philippine Touring Car Championship =

The Philippine Touring Car Championship (PTCC) is a touring car racing championship in the Philippines sanctioned by the Automobile Association Philippines (AAP). The series was established in 2005 as the Philippine National Touring Car Championship before adopting its current name in 2006.

== History ==
The championship originated in 2005 as the Philippine National Touring Car Championship (PNTCC), organized by Race Fans Incorporated. The inaugural season attracted 24 entries and was contested over multiple rounds at Subic International Raceway.

In 2006, the series was renamed the Philippine Touring Car Championship (PTCC). The championship expanded to 34 entries and continued under the sanctioning of the Automobile Association Philippines (AAP), with races held at both Subic International Raceway and Batangas Racing Circuit.
