= New Covenant Ministries International =

International Neo-charismatic Christian network

- Founded: 1982
- Founder: Dudley Daniel
- Type: Neocharismatic church network
- Origins: South Africa
- Region served: Worldwide
- Method: Church planting
- Key people: Tyrone Daniel, Dudley Daniel
- Website: Official website

New Covenant Ministries International (NCMI) is an international non-denominational Christian church network active in about 100 countries. NCMI defines itself as a trans-local (local church to local church) ministry team which helps pastors/elders build their local churches and equip Christian believers.

Independent commentators tend to describe NCMI as not just this team of leaders, but the network of all affiliated churches who partner (previously "relate") to the NCMI team, and say it has some characteristics of a denomination. Unlike most denominations, individual churches affiliated with NCMI retain their autonomy and are not required to sign a common constitution or statement of beliefs.

== Basis and beliefs ==
NCMI's foundational value is that the Bible (specifically, the Protestant canon) is the "only acceptable standard for life, ministry, and conduct in the Church". As such, NCMI's theology of church governance is that the early church as described in the New Testament is a God-ordained, prescriptive blueprint that modern local churches should follow. The NCMI "translocal team" ("translocal" refers to a team / person based in a local church who works in both a local region and internationally) believes in fivefold ministry, specifically the belief that the offices of apostle and prophet remain active and valid in the contemporary church, on the basis of Ephesians 4:11–13. In this sense NCMI could be considered a charismatic restorationist movement.

=== Statement of faith ===
In their statement of faith, NCMI affirms typical Baptist and Pentecostal beliefs, including biblical inspiration; the Trinity; the humanity, divinity and resurrection of Jesus Christ; and substitutionary atonement. Distinctive beliefs include the movement's view of church governance and the restoration of apostolic-prophetic teams. The statement avoids "entrapment in a fixed eschatological view on dispensationalism" and does not take a position on Reformed theology. (Note: Day-Lewis (1996, p. 115), an NCMI training manual, rejects the Reformed/Calvinist doctrine of "limited atonement". By contrast, NCMI Gauteng states "we are Reformed in our view of the church". [Deprecated.])

Partnering (previously "relating") local churches are not required to adopt NCMI's statement of faith, since in NCMI's view that would be an imposition of authority. Some churches use NCMI's statement of faith verbatim, while others write their own broadly compatible statements.

=== Similar movements ===
The beliefs of NCMI are not completely unique. Their theology and practices are also held by a number of other similar movements in varying degrees including: the International Churches of Christ (ICOC), Every Nation Churches and Ministries, Calvary Chapel, Salt and Light Ministries International, Newfrontiers, Ichthus Christian Fellowship and Link NZ.

== Involvement with local churches ==
NCMI's involvement provides otherwise autonomous churches with third party input (called invited authority), for both the congregation and church leaders. For the congregation, NCMI team members provide teaching, training in spiritual gifts, and "equipping of the priesthood for works of service". For church leadership, NCMI help with doctrine, discipline, church direction, advice on financial matters such as setting elders' salaries, and training. Based on their belief that the local church is autonomous, NCMI says it only speaks into situations or problems in a local church by invitation or when fraud or heresy are alleged.

=== Nature of relationship ===
NCMI asks relating local churches to enter a "primary, but not exclusive" relationship with it, meaning that local churches may seek the input of other apostolic networks or individuals. (Note: NCMI does not say whether or not a denominational church would be permitted to relate to it.) Churches cannot "join" NCMI, since NCMI considers itself fundamentally a team of people, not a network of churches. NCMI considers its role to be supporting and encouraging local churches with compatibility vision and values.

NCMI do not require money from partnering churches, although they do accept donations to support the translocal team. They also do not provide charitable status or tax exemptions for churches, as this would restrict autonomy.

=== Church leadership and governance ===
Following their understanding of the biblical pattern, NCMI believes that local churches should be led by a plurality of elders, in partnership with a translocal apostolic-prophetic team, whether it is NCMI or another team. NCMI encourages prospective partnering churches to reorganize their church to this arrangement if it differs.

The plurality of elders will have a leader known as the lead elder or visionary elder, whose role is to develop a vision and then in consultation with the other elders give vision or direction to other leaders such as deacons and subsequently to their local church. The lead elder is usually, but not necessarily, the primary teacher. Elders are considered synonymous with pastors, and elder is the preferred term. All terms are said to describe the function performed, not the maturity of the officer.

NCMI discourages churches from making decisions through democratic processes, since they do not believe this is biblical.

==== Titles and terminology ====
NCMI discourages church members from using formal titles (such as "Pastor Mark" or "Apostle Dudley") to refer to church leaders, whether the leader is a local church deacon or elder, or a member of the NCMI team. This interpretation is based on biblical texts where people were introduced by their first name and function, for example, "Paul, an apostle", but never "Apostle Paul". Members of the apostolic team often refrain from describing themselves with any label at all, instead allowing local churches to "define the gifting as they perceive it".

Local churches do not use the acronym NCMI or its full definition in the name of the church. Formally, churches do not say they are "NCMI churches", rather they "partner with NCMI".

==== Appointing elders ====
NCMI encourages local church elders to follow a specific process for selecting new elders. The elders of the local church identify one or more men (women are not eligible) who meet the various scriptural requirements (for example: 1 Timothy 3–5, Titus 1 and 1 Peter 5) and according to Pole, "have a proven track record of attending church meetings regularly, providing financial support..., exhibiting spiritual gifts and the fruit of the Holy Spirit... and supporting existing church leadership". The local church invites a member of the NCMI team to review and ultimately appoint or ordain the candidate(s), on the basis that only apostles may appoint or ordain elders (based on Acts 14:23). The local congregation is given an opportunity to express concerns. Elders, including elders who preach, are not expected to have formal theological or professional training, but may be encouraged to pursue it. NCMI team members also may be "based" in a local church but their function in the NCMI team is not supposed to make them superior to other elders nor does it mandate they fill the role of the "lead" elder.

Manley writes that in some cases "when a lead elder leaves a church, [NCMI] will send a new lead elder and expect the existing eldership... to stand down...." According to Manley, through their influence over appointing elders, replacing lead elders and monitoring church finances, the NCMI team effectively exerts hierarchical control over local churches similar to denominations.

==== Criticism of leadership model ====
Third parties and ex-members of NCMI have specifically criticized NCMI's distinctive church leadership model.

Allan Anderson, professor of Mission and Pentecostal Studies, remarked that NCMI churches are "highly patriarchal in leadership; leaders tend to make unilateral decisions based on the 'leading of the [Holy] Spirit'."

Chris Wienand, former NCMI team member, wrote in 2009 of his NCMI experiences, "the recent years saw us preoccupied with an ecclesiology that was 'over realized'.... We preached 'model', 'pattern' passionately. But our God is gracious, kind and infinitely generous. He walked us back... to the gospel we had so sadly sent to the bookends of our convictions. After 25 years of pastoral ministry I had to admit to a wonderful community that I had erred."

=== Church planting ===
Church planting is a major component of NCMI's understanding of the local church and church growth. NCMI founder Dudley Daniel wrote, "an apostolic church has a mandate to see the church advancing in its witness to the world by fulfilling the Great Commission (Matthew 28:19), by planting churches in every town and village, making disciples of all nations." (Emphasis added.)

== History ==
The NCMI team was originally founded by Dudley Daniel in South Africa in the early 1980s and is currently led by Tyrone Daniel.

=== Origins (1982–1990) ===
Map of South Africa

NCMI started in South Africa, around 1982 with a group of church leaders meeting together in Bryanston, a suburb of Johannesburg, to build relationships and discuss issues in their churches. Dudley Daniel emerged as key influence in developing this group. In January 1983 the group, then comprising about ten churches in greater Johannesburg, ratified a constitution for "New Covenant Ministries" based on "Bible Values" with the South African government, enabling them to recognize local churches, appoint church ministers or functions, and acquire property. At this time, all local church elders were members of the "covering body" of New Covenant Ministries and local congregations were autonomous.

Starting in 1983, the movement became "involved with missions, church planting, cross-cultural ministry, mission outreach, and mercy ministry to the poor [...] and to victims of disaster", including activities in neighbouring Swaziland, Mozambique and Lesotho. The movement also began to hold conferences and retreats for leaders of their churches, the precursor to Leadership Training Times, with Dudley Daniel providing much of the teaching.

By the late 1980s, the group had grown to about 70 relating church pastors. Around the same time, the apostolic-prophetic team emerged as a core group, distinct from the relating church pastors.

=== International expansion (1990–2004) ===
In 1990, the movement began to focus on international growth, appending "International" to its original name, "New Covenant Ministries". Daniel relocated his family to Australia in the early 1990s, coinciding with the official abolishment of apartheid in South Africa. In 1996, the "apostolic team" counted 13 men and their wives.

In the late 1990s Daniel moved to Los Angeles, California to "contribute to envisioning and equipping churches in the USA". By September 1999, Daniel was suffering from severe health problems. He and his wife returned to Adelaide in 2002.

Relating churches by region (2001)
Region	Churches
Africa (outside South Africa)	5–6,000?
South Africa	200
Australia	25

By mid-2001, NCMI stated they had 7,000 relating churches located in over 80 countries around the world.

Attendance at the largest leadership training meeting in Bryanston grew from 1,000 people in 1990 to nearly in 5,000 in 2005, reflecting the movement's overall growth.

Manley wrote that, in 2001, of the eight original signatories to New Covenant Ministries, only three remained in the movement, with only Dudley Daniel and Rigby Wallace at the forefront. Around this time Coastlands International Christian Centre (Adelaide) functioned as an unofficial headquarters and regional base for Australasia, with Southlands Church International (Los Angeles) and New Covenant Church (Bryanston) as regional bases for North America and southern Africa respectively.

==== International Theological Correspondence College ====
In the mid-1990s, NCMI established the International Theological Correspondence College (ITCC), a correspondence college that worked in partnership with the South African Theological Seminary. The College offered a non-accredited program, containing only NCMI material and requiring no examination; and a fully accredited Diploma in Theology. (Note: Recognized by the Council on Higher Education in South Africa) In 2006, the College had 300 students enrolled. NCMI ceased operating ITCC by 2010.

=== Tenure of Tyrone Daniel (2004–present) ===
In 2004, Dudley Daniel and his Life Team selected Dudley's son, Tyrone Daniel, as the successor. By 2005 the team had grown to 280 people. Tyrone also became the lead elder of Coastlands International Christian Centre. He eventually transferred its leadership to his brother, Jon Daniel.

In 2010, Tyrone Daniel relocated from Australia to the United States and established a new church plant, Redemption City Church in Denver, Colorado. In 2017, he transferred the leadership to Terry and Sandy Kreuger.

Countries in which NCMI was active (2006)

==== Structure ====
NCMI describes itself not as a group of churches, but a team of apostles, prophets, pastors, teachers and evangelists (according to the list in Ephesians 4) who desire to help local autonomous churches grow into "all God has for them". As mentioned above, NCMI team members are all based in a local church and work in and through their local church, but their function in the NCMI team is not supposed to make them superior to other elders nor does it mandate they fill the role of the "lead" elder.

In practice, the NCMI team is organised into smaller teams with responsibility for specific areas, and their ministry work includes organising conferences for teaching and disseminating their values, along with visiting relating local churches as guest speakers and to provide advice and support for local leadership. NCMI does not require donations from local churches but does accept them, both to individual guest speakers and to a decentralised ministry fund.

A more comprehensive and updated understanding on some of the theology of NCMI's ecclesiology can be found on the website's "books" section, particularly by writer and theologian, Ryan Peter. (Note: "Practicing Doctrine in the Churches: How the NCMI team and eldership teams form theology and work together," by Ryan Peter. NCMI.net "books".)

=== Committees ===
Manley states that by 2001, the initial idea of local church autonomy gave way to a "bulky" leadership structure of "distinct hierarchies. The NCMI team as a whole was partitioned into smaller teams with authority in specific matters or regions. He acknowledges that NCMI has made an effort to describe and encourage non-hierarchical leadership structures.

These "teams within the team" and their responsibilities were:

- Governmental Teams
  - Life Team – personal accountability group for Dudley and Ann Daniel
  - Financial Team – oversight of international finances
  - Consultants Team – working with Dudley and the Life Team to "help give perspective to the broader ministry"
  - International Team – people able to travel and ordain elders
  - General Ordaining Teams – people operating in specific geographic regions
- Non-Governmental Team – provide training and ministry in regional meetings, but excluded from "governmental responsibility" such as doctrinal issues, direction and discipline

NCMI continues to describe their structure as "teams within the team" with a variety of functions, but no longer provides details on how the teams are organized.

=== Conferences ===
A major part of NCMI's work is facilitated through conferences organized by NCMI. According to Black, "the effectiveness of the churches relating to NCMI is largely due to the high mobility of the Apostolic team and the ongoing connection through [Equips and smaller conferences]." These conferences have no fixed agenda, but include worship, ministry of spiritual gifts, and teaching, usually led by a member of the apostolic team.

==== Equip conferences ====
NCMI hosts periodic Equip conferences (Note: Past names for these conferences were: Retreats for Leaders, Conferences for Leaders, and Leadership Training Times (LTTs).) around the world, and numerous smaller events in local regions.

In 2006, Equip conferences were hosted in 33 countries, covering North America, South America, Europe, the Middle East, sub-Saharan Africa, and southeast Asia. (Note: Black (2006, p. 127) gives a full list: Persian Gulf, Australia, Botswana, Brazil, Canada, Democratic Republic of Congo, Denmark, Dubai, Egypt, Ethiopia, Germany, Ghana, Holland [sic], India, Indonesia, Ivory Coast, Jordan, Kenya, Kuwait, Lesotho, Liberia, Madagascar, Malawi, Mexico, Mongolia, Mozambique, Namibia, New Zealand, Nigeria, Senegal, South Africa, South East Asia, Swaziland and Tanzania.)

Leaders attending conferences or visiting other churches pay their own travel expenses and accommodations, meaning their home church must have the necessary finances to support their travel.

==== Regional conferences ====
A few times per year, NCMI-partnering churches will organize short, smaller scale Geographical Training Times (or Regional Training Times), usually under the ministry of one or two members of the NCMI team. Unlike Equip conferences these are not promoted internationally.

==== Other conferences ====
NCMI also holds training times for prospective NCMI team members and church planters.

=== Official and legal organization ===
NCMI does not maintain an official headquarters. Based on the lack of an official headquarters and the relational network of autonomous churches, they say that they are neither a denomination nor a movement.

Since NCMI finds no biblical precedent for voting on decisions, NCMI team members do not vote but rather make decisions by arriving at a consensus. They discourage relating local churches from either voting among the eldership, or permitting the congregation to vote on any decision.

NCMI does maintain a website, various legal entities in countries in which it operates, and a post office box in Colorado, U.S.A.

== Criticism ==
Allan Anderson, professor of Mission and Pentecostal Studies, wrote in 2005 that NCMI is "dominated by white South Africans, who lead many local churches and church plants around the world, preside over NCMI conferences, and predominate the membership of the apostolic team". Speaking of South African Pentecostalism in general and explicitly mentioning NCMI, Anderson contrasts the rise of expensive megachurches and "jet-set" apostolic networks in white, middle-class South Africa to the poverty of majority black Pentecostals. He says that as of 2005, South African Pentecostal churches were still divided along ethnic lines and were not "proactive with regard to such severe social problems as the AIDS pandemic, rising poverty and crime". In Anderson's view, these churches are "not making an impact nor addressing challenges posed by a rapidly changing [post-apartheid South African] society".
