= Honda Civic Type R =

High performance variant of the Honda Civic

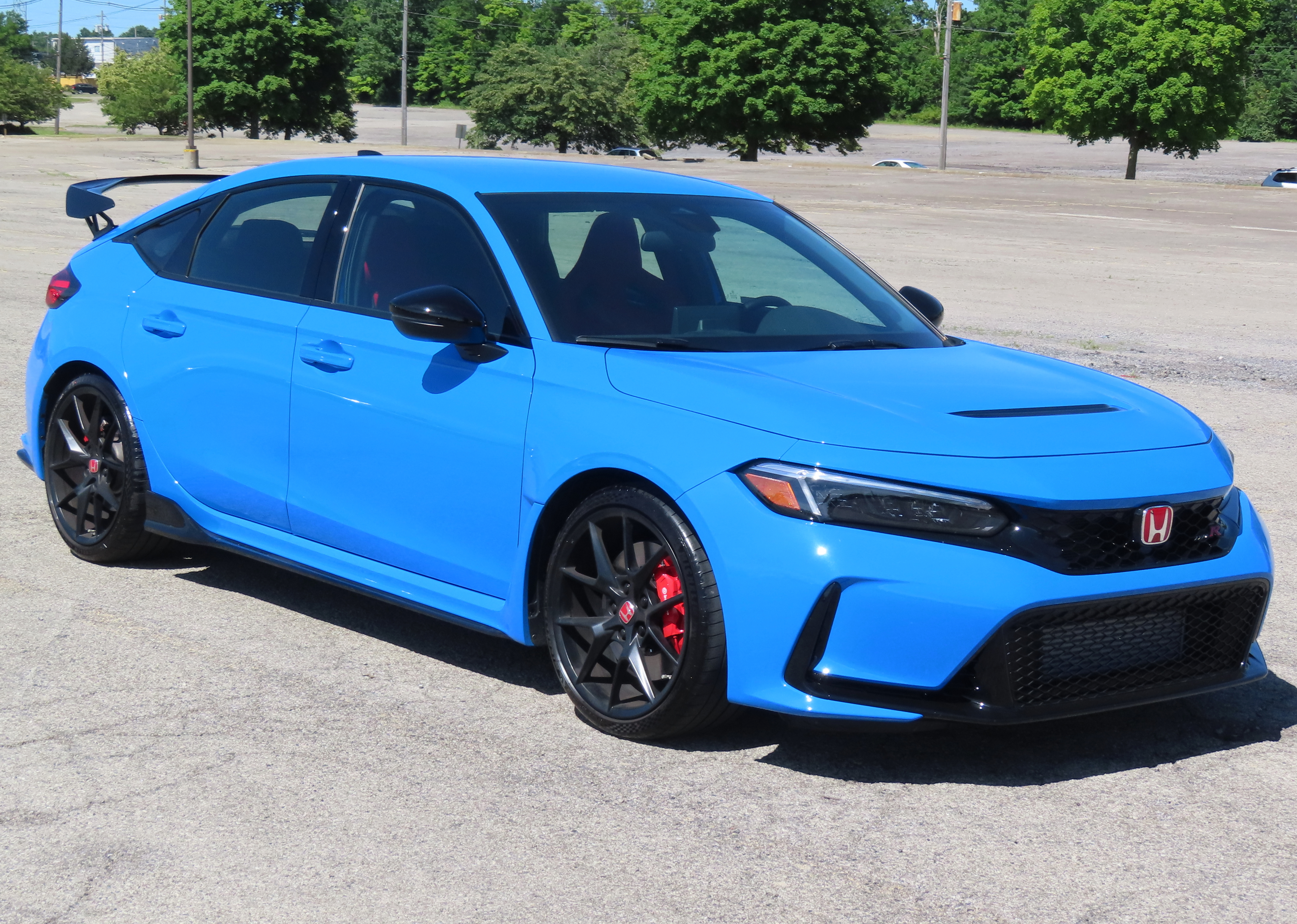
- Civic Type R (FL5)

Overview
- Manufacturer: Honda
- Production: September 1997 – present

Body and chassis
- Class: Sport compact car
- Body style: 3-door hatchback (1997–2011); 5-door hatchback (2015–2022); 5-door liftback (2022–present); 4-door sedan (2007–2011; FD2 only)
- Layout: Front-engine, front-wheel-drive
- Related: Honda Civic

The Honda Civic Type R (Japanese: ホンダ・シビックタイプR, Hepburn: Honda Shibikku Taipuāru) is a series of hot hatchback and sports sedan models based on the Civic, developed and produced by Honda since September 1997. The first Civic Type R was the third model to receive Honda's Type R badge (after the NSX and Integra). Type R versions of the Civic typically feature a lightened and stiffened body, a specially tuned engine, and upgraded brakes and chassis, and are offered only in five- or six-speed manual transmission. The drivetrain is front-engine, front-wheel drive (FF layout). Like other Type R models, red is used in the background of the Honda badge to distinguish it from other models.

== EK9 (1997; based on sixth generation Civic) ==
First generation
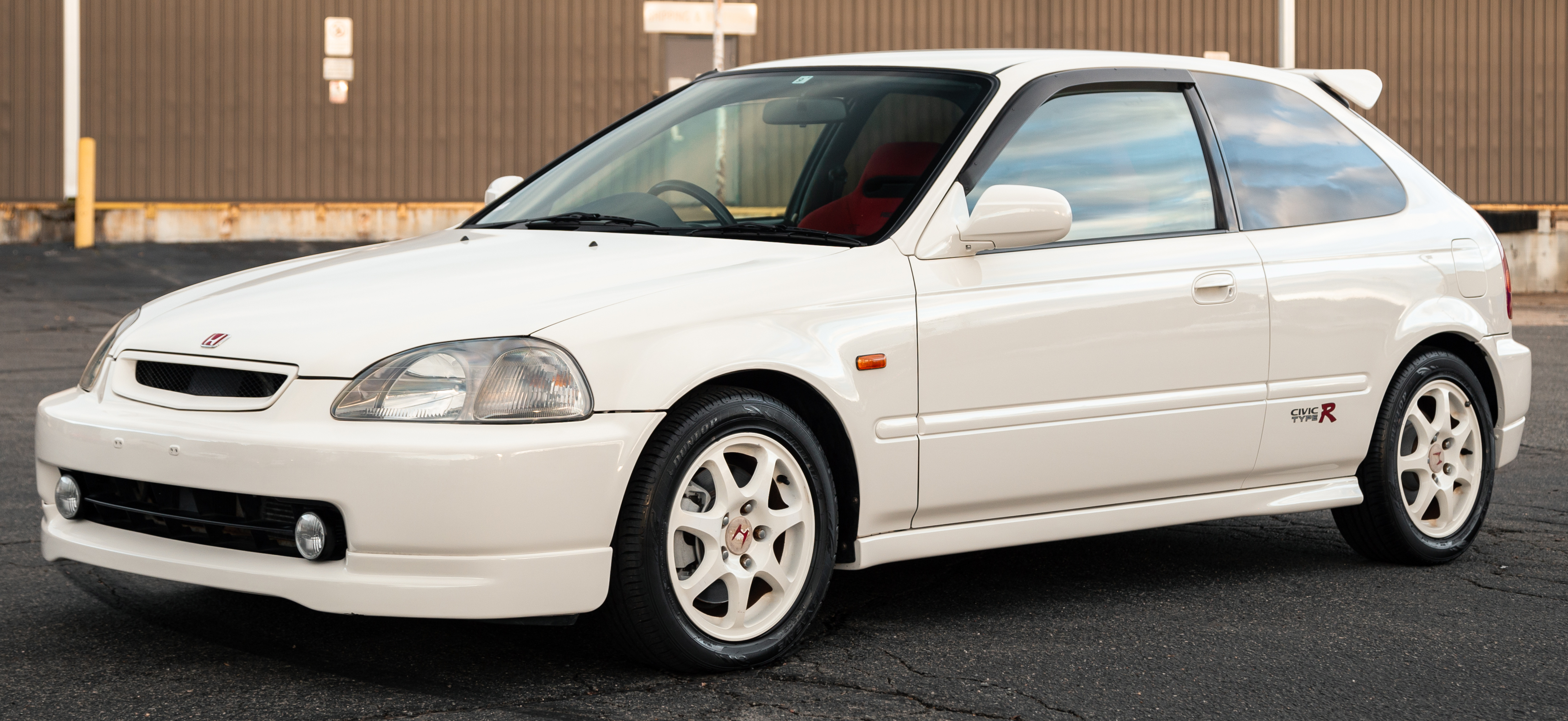
- Pre-facelift (1997–1998)

Overview
- Model code: EK9
- Production: September 1997 – 2000
- Assembly: Japan: Suzuka, Mie
- Designer: Akira Shimoyama

Body and chassis
- Body style: 3-door hatchback

Powertrain
- Engine: 1.6 L (1,595 cc) B16B VTEC I4
- Power output: 185 PS (136 kW; 182 hp) and 160 N⋅m (118 lbf⋅ft)
- Transmission: 5-speed manual

Dimensions
- Wheelbase: 2,620 mm (103.1 in)
- Length: 4,180 mm (164.6 in)
- Width: 1,695 mm (66.7 in)
- Height: 1,360 mm (53.5 in)
- Curb weight: 1,050–1,070 kg (2,315–2,359 lb)

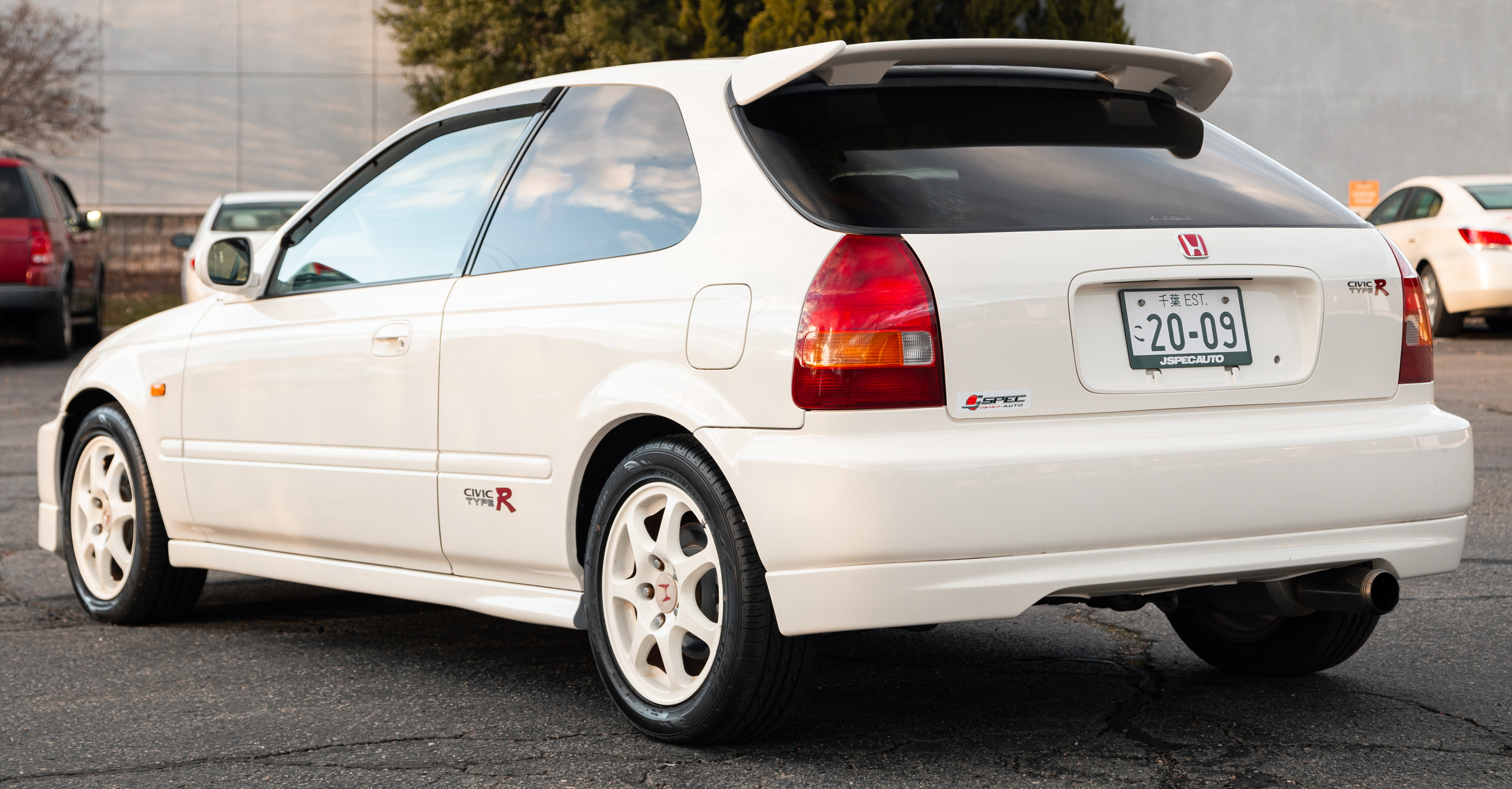
Pre-facelift (1997–1998)

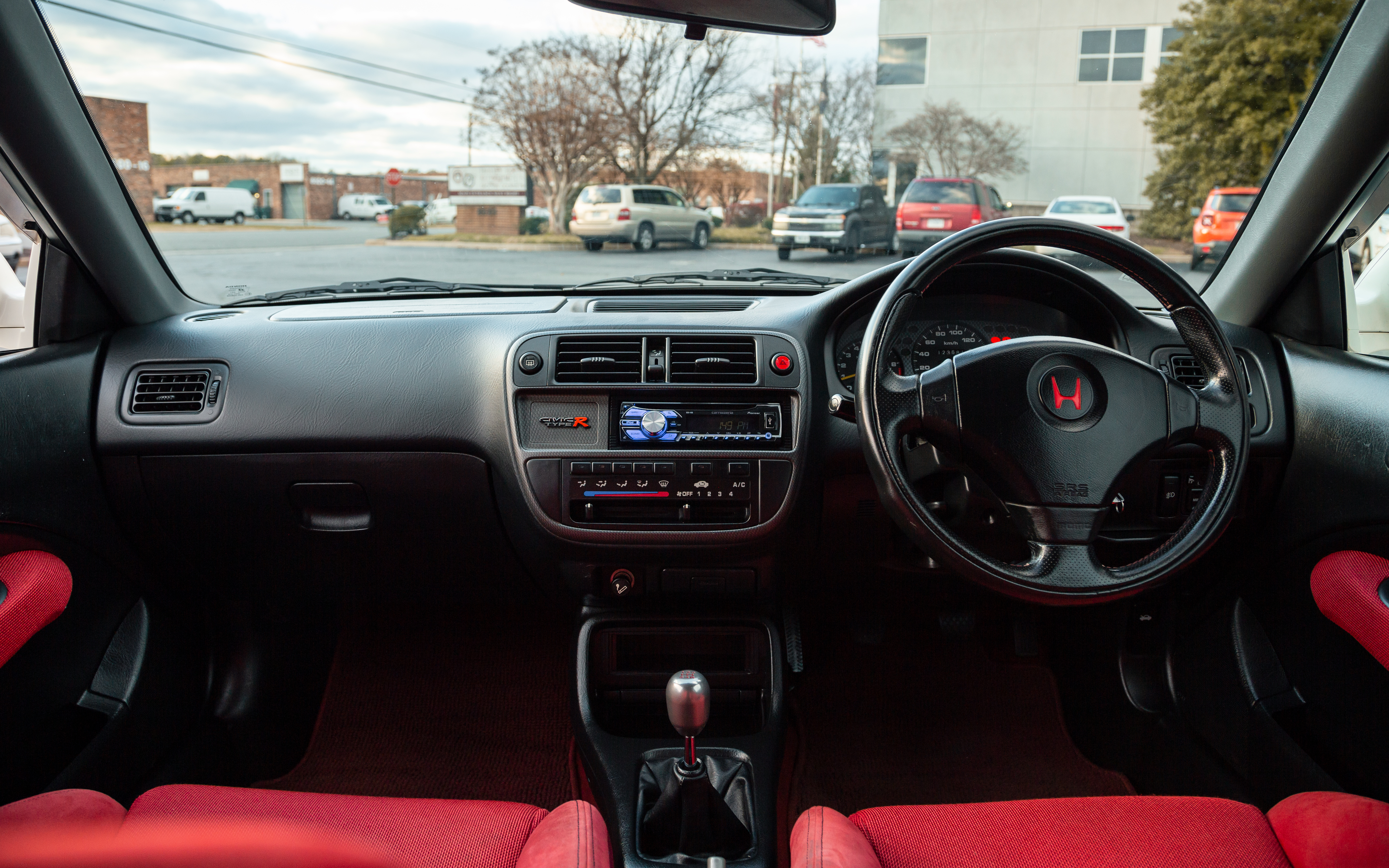
Interior

The first Civic to receive the 'Type R' nameplate was based on the fan-base 'EK' Civic, the sixth-generation. The contributing base model was the JDM Civic 3-door hatchback called the SiR (code-named EK4). Like its sibling, the Integra Type R DC2/JDM DB8, the Civic SiR's transformation into a Type R was achieved by building on the base model and refining it into Honda's vision of a car capable of high performance on the circuit.

The first Civic to receive the Type R badge was introduced on 19 August 1997, as the EK9. The EK9 shared many characteristics with the Integra Type R DC2/JDM DB8, such as the omission of sound deadening and other weight reduction measures, a hand-ported 1.6-litre DOHC VTEC B16B 4-cylinder engine, front-helical limited-slip differential and a close-ratio 5-speed manual transmission. The B16B engine boasted one of the highest power output per litre of all time for a naturally aspirated engine with 185 PS (136 kW; 182 hp) at 8,200 rpm and 160 N⋅m (118 lb⋅ft) at 7,500 rpm of torque from 1.6 L (1,595 cc) of displacement. For the first time, a strategically seam-welded monocoque chassis was used to improve chassis rigidity. The interior featured red Recaro bucket seats, red door cards, red Type R floor mats, a titanium shift knob, and a Momo leather-wrapped steering wheel. The EK9 was only available for sale in Japan.

Performance figures include a 0–97 km/h (0–60 mph) acceleration time of 6.7 seconds and a quarter-mile time of 15.3 seconds. The EK9 could reach a top speed of 225 km/h (140 mph).

In 1998, the Civic Type R Motor Sports edition was introduced. It came with steel wheels, the standard grey EK interior, manual windows, no air conditioning, and no other creature comforts.

=== Facelift ===
The Type Rx model introduced in 1999 was given a CD player, body-colored retractable electric door mirrors, power windows, auto air conditioning, keyless entry unlock system, aluminium sports pedals, and a carbon-type center panel. The Type Rx was the final model of the EK9 generation. Production of the EK9 Civic Type R totalled 16,000 units.

In 1999, Honda tuning company Spoon Sports designed an N1 racing version of the Type R that had the B16B engine redline increased from 8,400 rpm to 11,000 rpm.

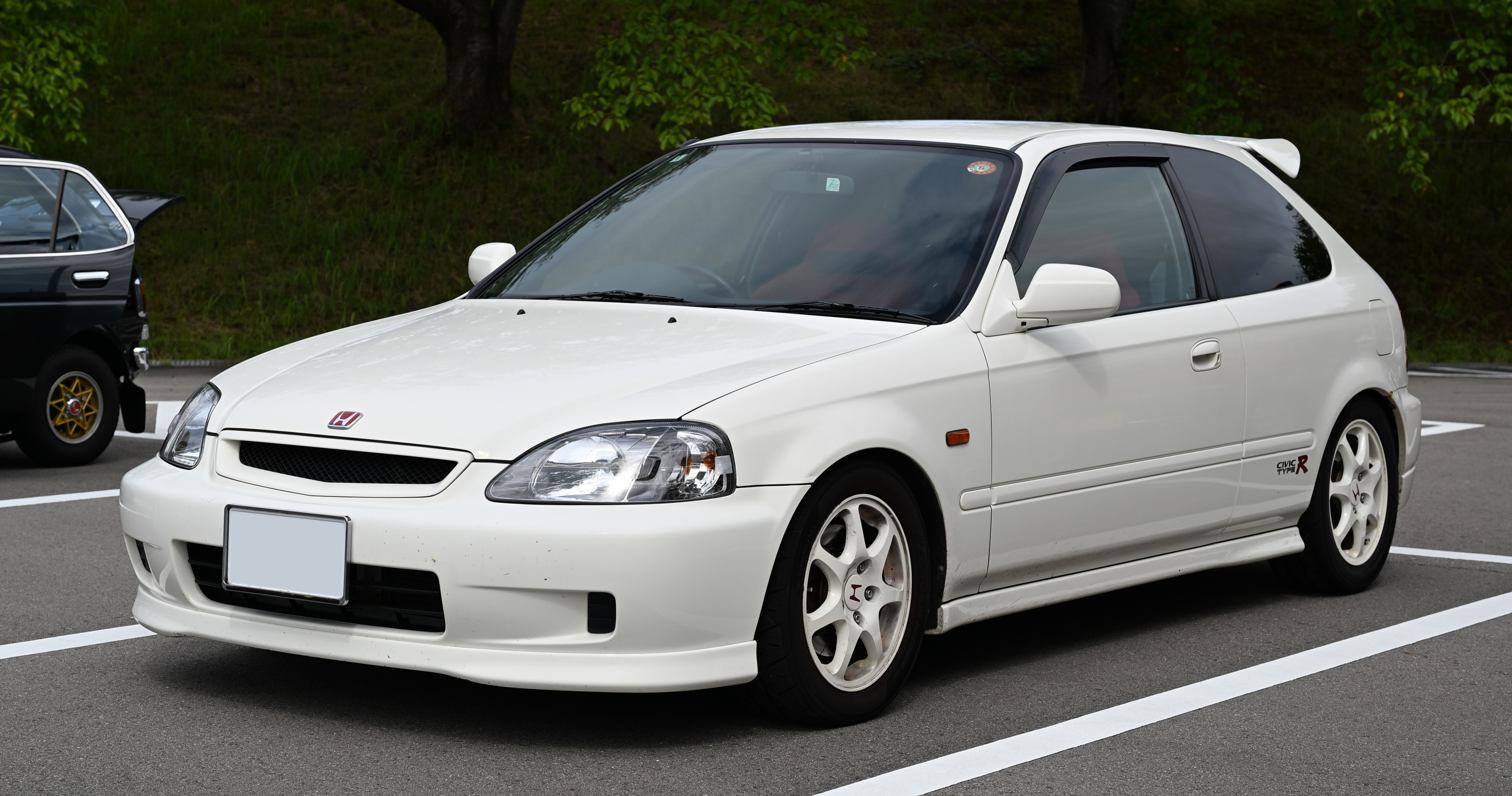
Facelift (1998–2000)

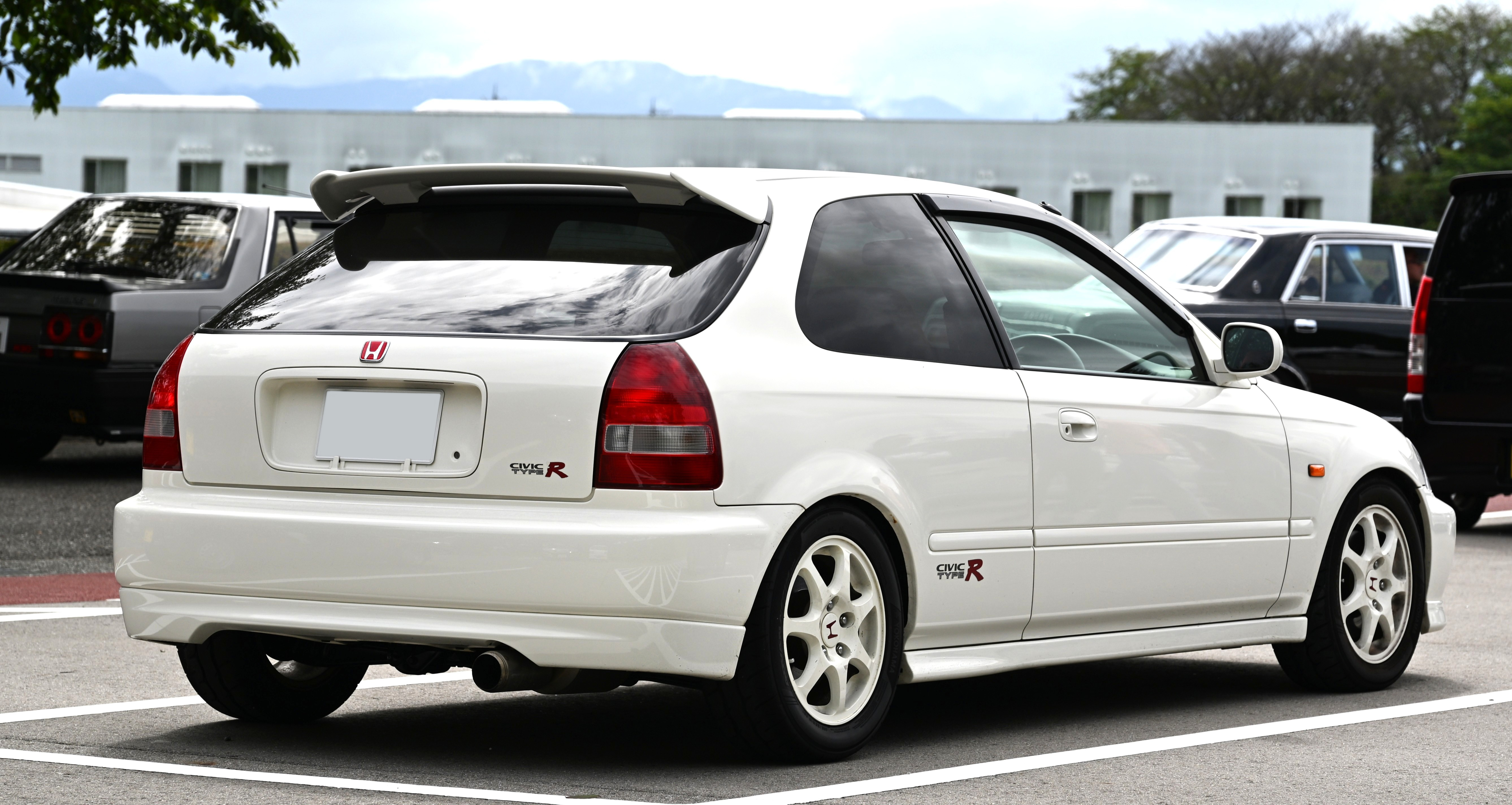
Facelift (1998–2000)

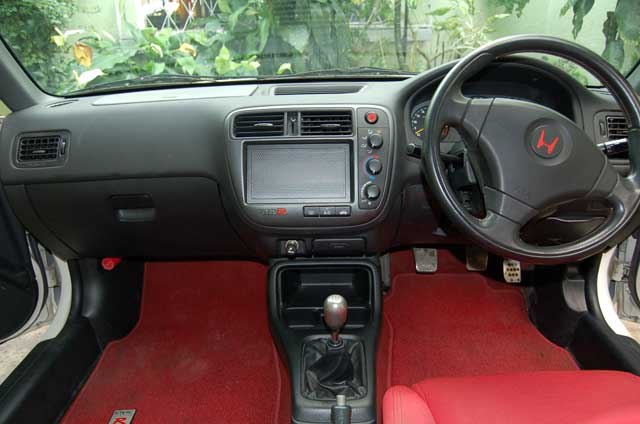
Interior

== EP3 (2001; based on seventh generation Civic) ==
Second generation
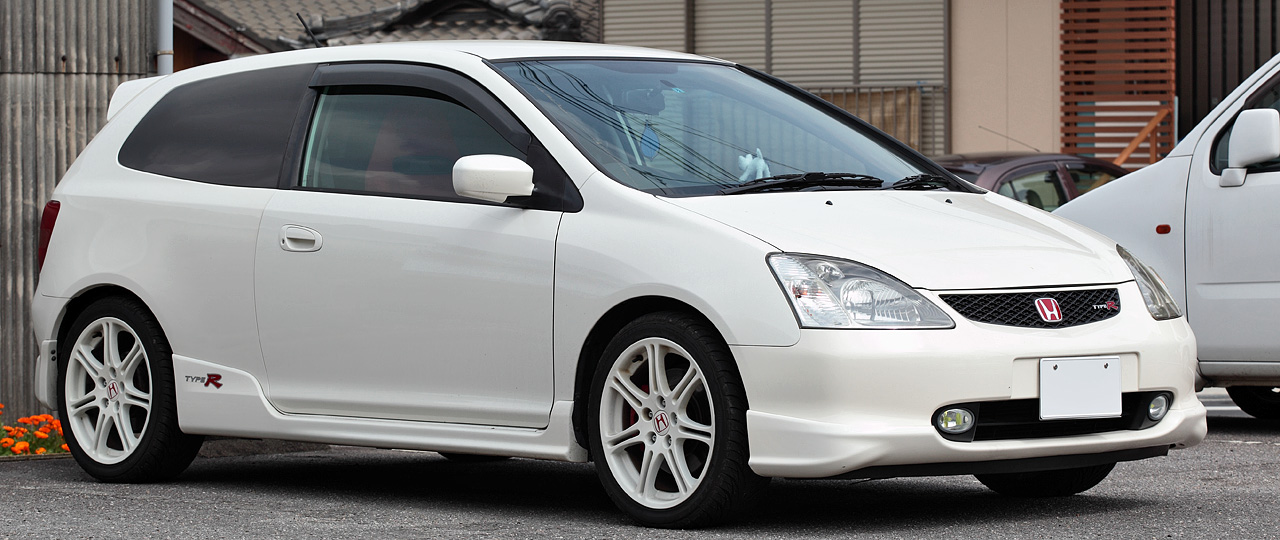
- Pre-facelift (2001–2003)

Overview
- Model code: EP3
- Production: 2001–2005
- Assembly: United Kingdom: Swindon (Honda UK)

Body and chassis
- Body style: 3-door hatchback

Powertrain
- Engine: 2.0 L K20A i-VTEC I4; 2.0 L K20A2 i-VTEC I4
- Power output: K20A: 215 PS (158.1 kW; 212.1 hp); K20A2: 200 PS (147.1 kW; 197.3 hp)
- Transmission: 6-speed manual

Dimensions
- Wheelbase: 2,570 mm (101.2 in)
- Length: 4,135 mm (162.8 in)
- Width: 1,695 mm (66.7 in)
- Height: 1,430 mm (56.3 in)
- Curb weight: 1,190–1,205 kg (2,624–2,657 lb)

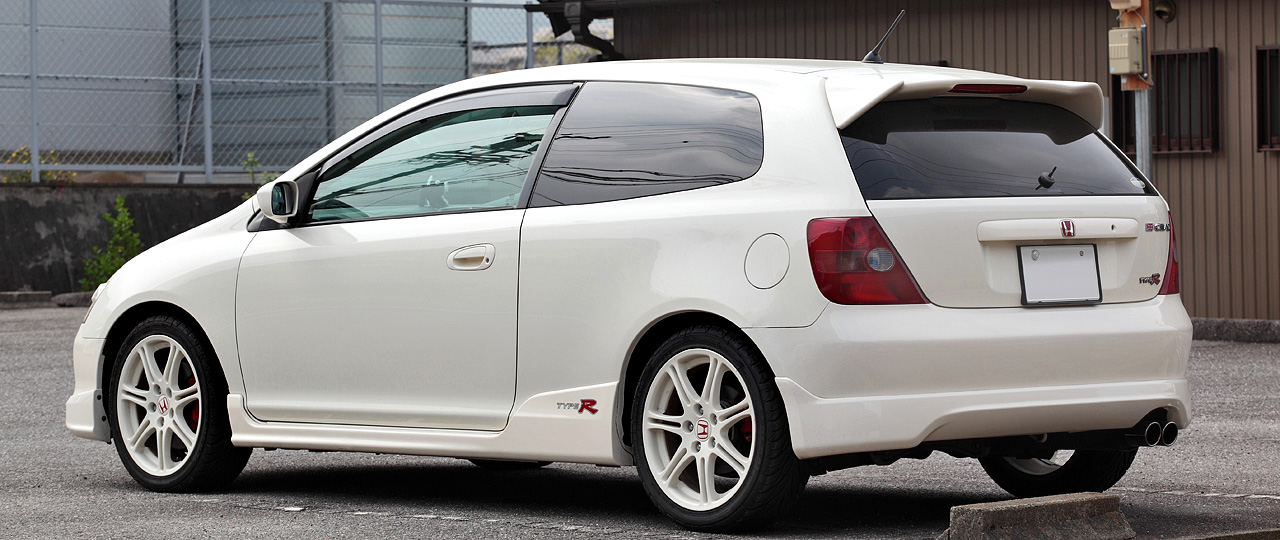
Pre-facelift (2001–2003)

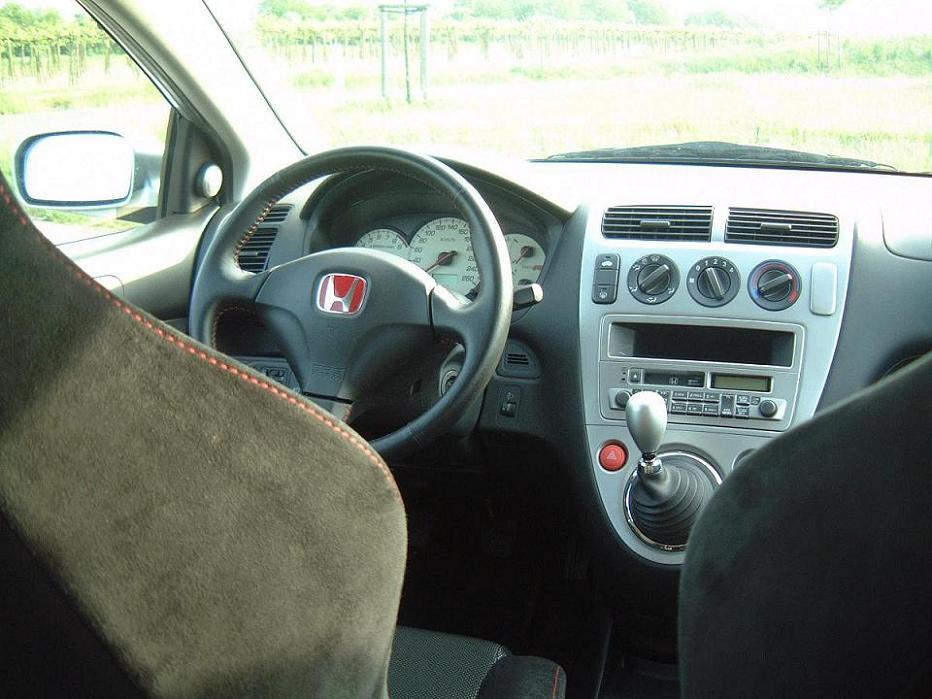
Interior

In 2001, Honda introduced the next-generation Civic Type R as a unique 3-door hatchback to the UK market; it was manufactured in Swindon, England. This European Domestic Market Civic Type R featured a 200 PS (147 kW; 197 hp) 2.0-litre i-VTEC engine (K20A2) and the regular Type R treatment of seam welding, close-ratio 6-speed transmission, and upgraded brakes, but did not include some of the other higher-end features such as the helical limited-slip differential and red Recaro race seats that were standard on the EK9.

However, Honda marketed a JDM (Japanese domestic market) version of the EP3 (exclusively manufactured in Swindon, UK, and shipped to Japan) that retained the highly renowned helical LSD, similar to that of the EK9, and red Recaro race seats. Other differences of the JDM model included more track-oriented chassis/undercarriage settings as compared to the European model, as well as a more powerful engine having a power output of 215 PS (158 kW; 212 hp) (designated K20A), which had a fully balanced crankshaft assembly with a different intake manifold, exhaust manifold, high-lift camshafts, high-compression pistons, chrome-moly flywheel, and ECU programming. All Japan-spec K20A Type R powertrains were built in Japan and shipped to the Swindon plant for installation in the Japan-spec Type R EP3. The JDM EP3 was also available in the traditional Type R Championship White, while the European domestic market (EDM) version was not. The EDM variant has more-relaxed gear ratios and some high-rpm torque traded for low-rpm torque compared to the JDM variant.

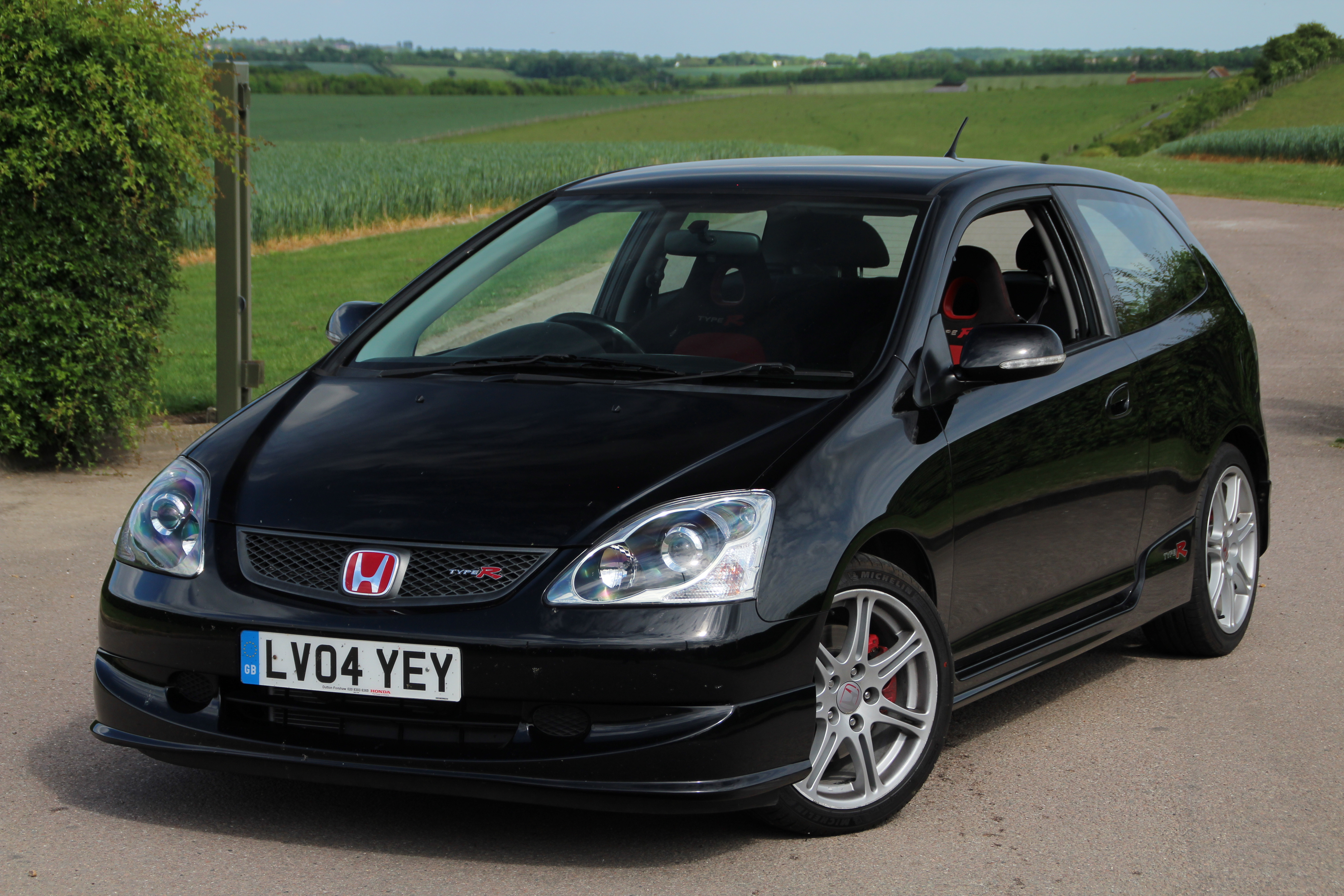

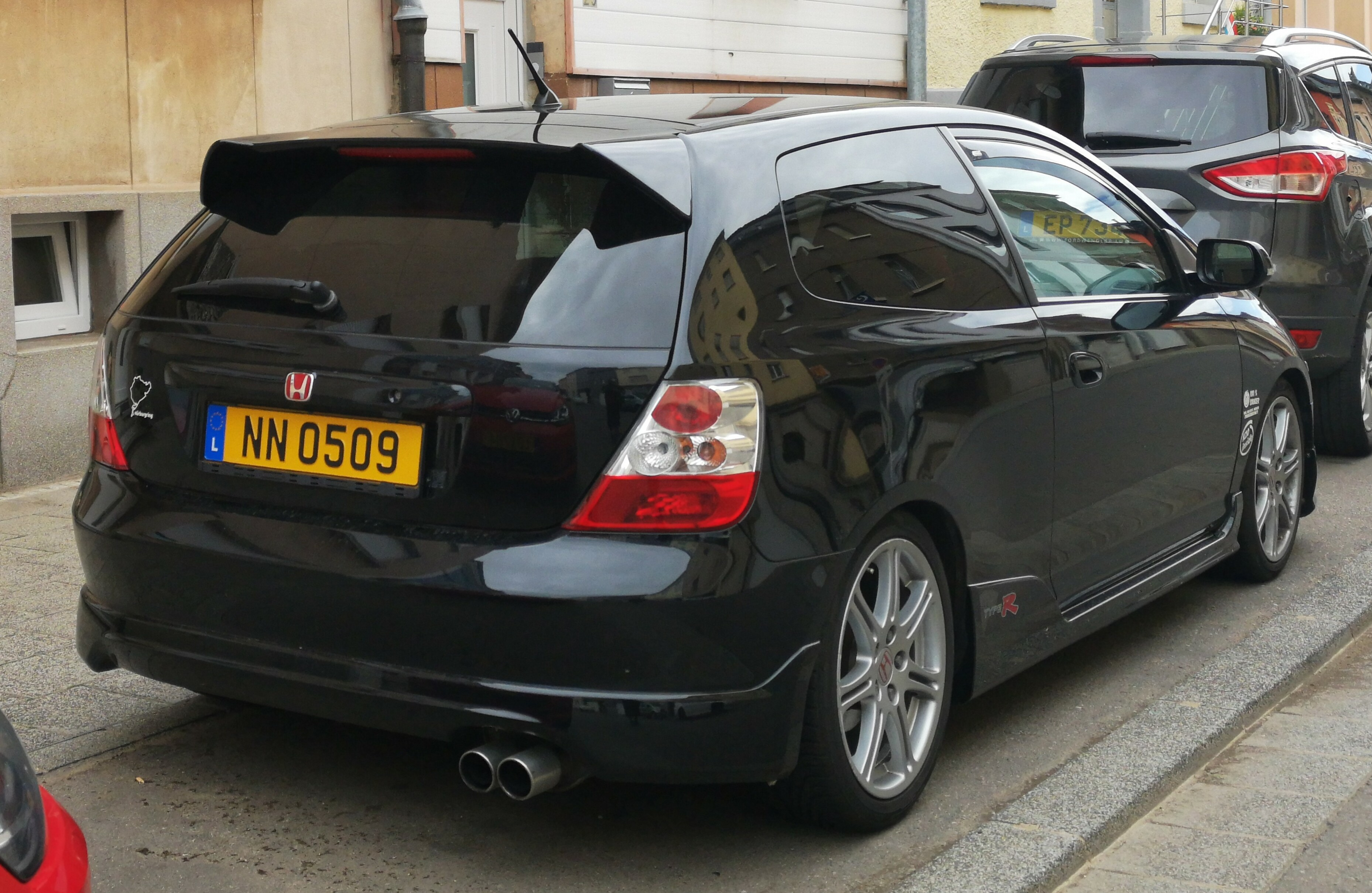
Facelift (2003–2005)

In 2003, the EP3 was updated with many improvements – revised EPS with quicker steering, revised suspension settings, projector headlamps (JDM came equipped with halogens only, while the EDM offered an option for HIDs with self-leveling motors), a lighter clutch and flywheel assembly, etc. Based on Honda literature, this facelifted (FL) model was intended to address customer and critic feedback, including understeer at the limit (due to the front MacPherson strut setup), a numb steering response, and a lack of low-end torque.

Performance (all figures are manufacturer claims)

- 0–97 km/h (60 mph) in 5.8/6.5 seconds (JDM/EDM Pre-facelift), 5.8/6.4 seconds (JDM/EDM Facelift)
- 0–161 km/h (100 mph) in 15.1/16 seconds (JDM/EDM Facelift)
- Top speed 227 km/h (141 mph) and 235 km/h (146 mph) (JDM/EDM) Note: JDM (Japanese Export Model), EDM (European Domestic Model).

Mugen Motorsports developed an upgraded version of the JDM Civic Type R, with a sport exhaust system and engine tuning, a special Mugen grille, and anti-roll bars for pro racing activities.

A total of 25,798 units were built for Europe and Japan. Europe received 24,334 units, and Japan received 1,464 units.

=== 30th Anniversary Edition ===
In 2003, Honda celebrated 30 years of the Civic badge by offering a special edition 30th Anniversary Civic Type R. This special edition featured red Recaro bucket seats, air conditioning, privacy glass on the rear windows, a leather-wrapped MOMO steering wheel, red interior carpet and door cards. The 30th Anniversary models in the UK were available in Nighthawk Black, Satin Silver and Milano Red. Only 300 of these models were produced, 100 in each color.

=== Premier Edition ===
In 2005, towards the end of the EP3's production run, Honda introduced the Civic Type R Premier Edition, which had Recaro Trendline seats (similar to those found in the Anniversary Edition, only in red and black rather than all red), a darker shade of fabric on the rear seat center sections, a MOMO steering wheel, red carpet, door linings, "Type R" embossed into the front brake calipers, and black privacy glass on the rear windows. Air conditioning was an option. They were available in Milano Red, Nighthawk Black, Cosmic Grey and Satin Silver.

=== C Package ===
In 2004, Honda introduced the "C Package" option (¥330,000 JPY) to Japan's Civic Type R lineup, which included an additional color, Satin Silver Metallic, HID lighting, rear privacy glass, an automatic air conditioner, carbon-fiber accents on the dashboard, and an outside air temperature sensor.

=== Last year of production ===
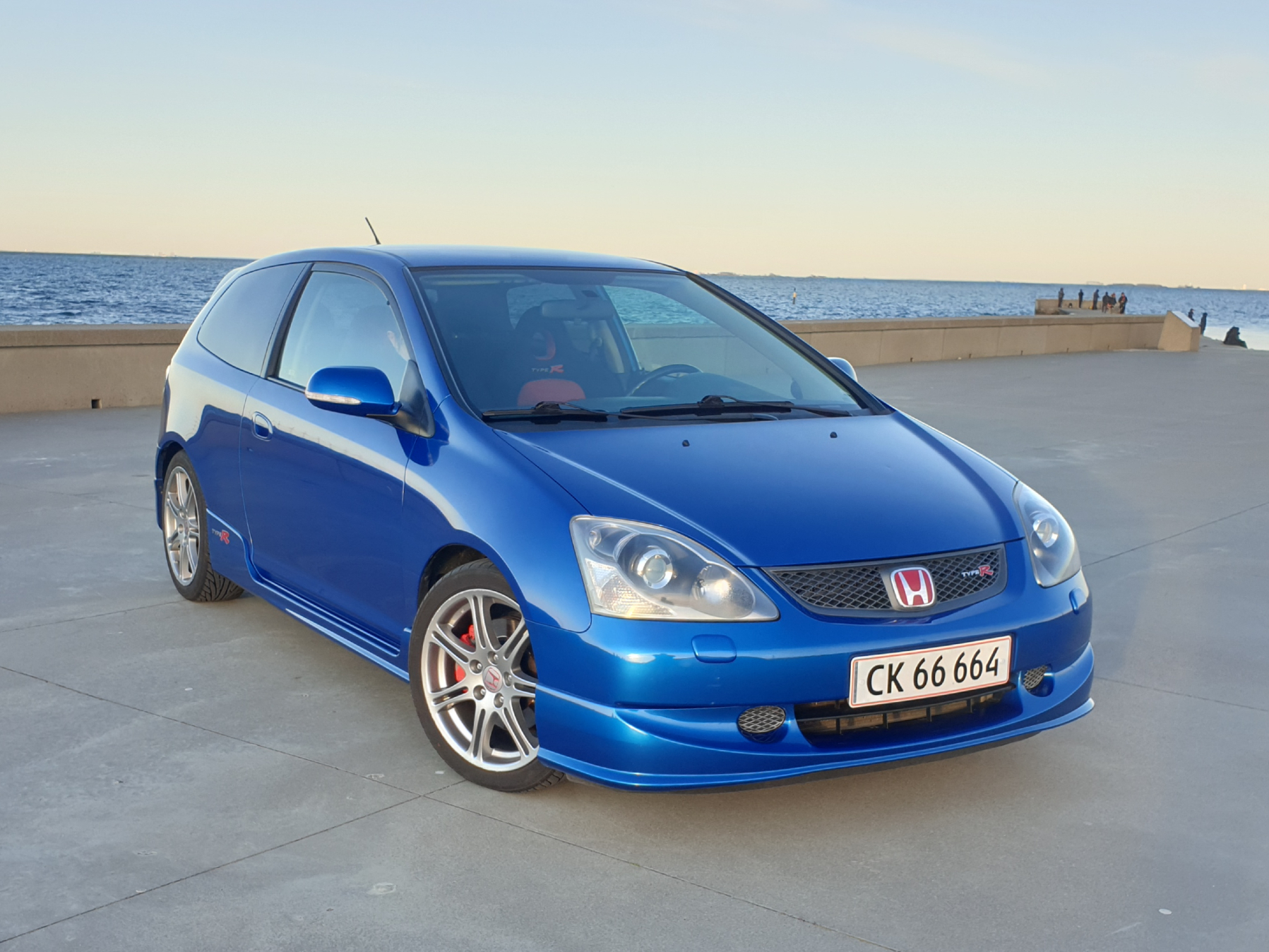
2005 Honda Civic EP3 Type R in Vivid Blue Pearl

In its final production year (2005), the EP3 Type R was offered in Vivid Blue Pearl in the European market. A total of 132 EP3s, which were all left-hand drive, were produced in Vivid Blue Pearl.

The 2005 Vivid Blue Pearl EP3 is often mistaken for a Premier Edition, which it is not. They were sold with the standard, facelifted Type R interior, although they also had other variations that were not found on the right-hand-drive EP3s sold in the UK market.

All 132 Vivid Blue Pearl EP3s were delivered with xenon headlights featuring integrated headlight washer jets in the front bumpers, as well as a height sensor in the right rear wheel arch, which automatically adjusts the light beam height as required by EU regulations.

It is also fitted with rear privacy glass and an outside air temperature sensor, as well as the EUDM center console with mechanical knobs placed over the radio unit, as opposed to the UK, US, and JDM models with electronic knobs fitted on the side of the radio unit.

Sales figures

Country:	Units sold:
Finland	17
Spain	12
Russia	3
Switzerland	51
Lithuania	4
Latvia	1
Sweden	43
Estonia	1

== FD2/FN2 (2007; based on eighth generation Civic) ==
The third generation of the Civic Type R was offered in two distinct models: one developed for the Japanese domestic market and the other for the UK and international markets, each matching the availability of its regular 8th generation counterpart.

=== FD2 (Japanese version) ===
Third generation (Japan)
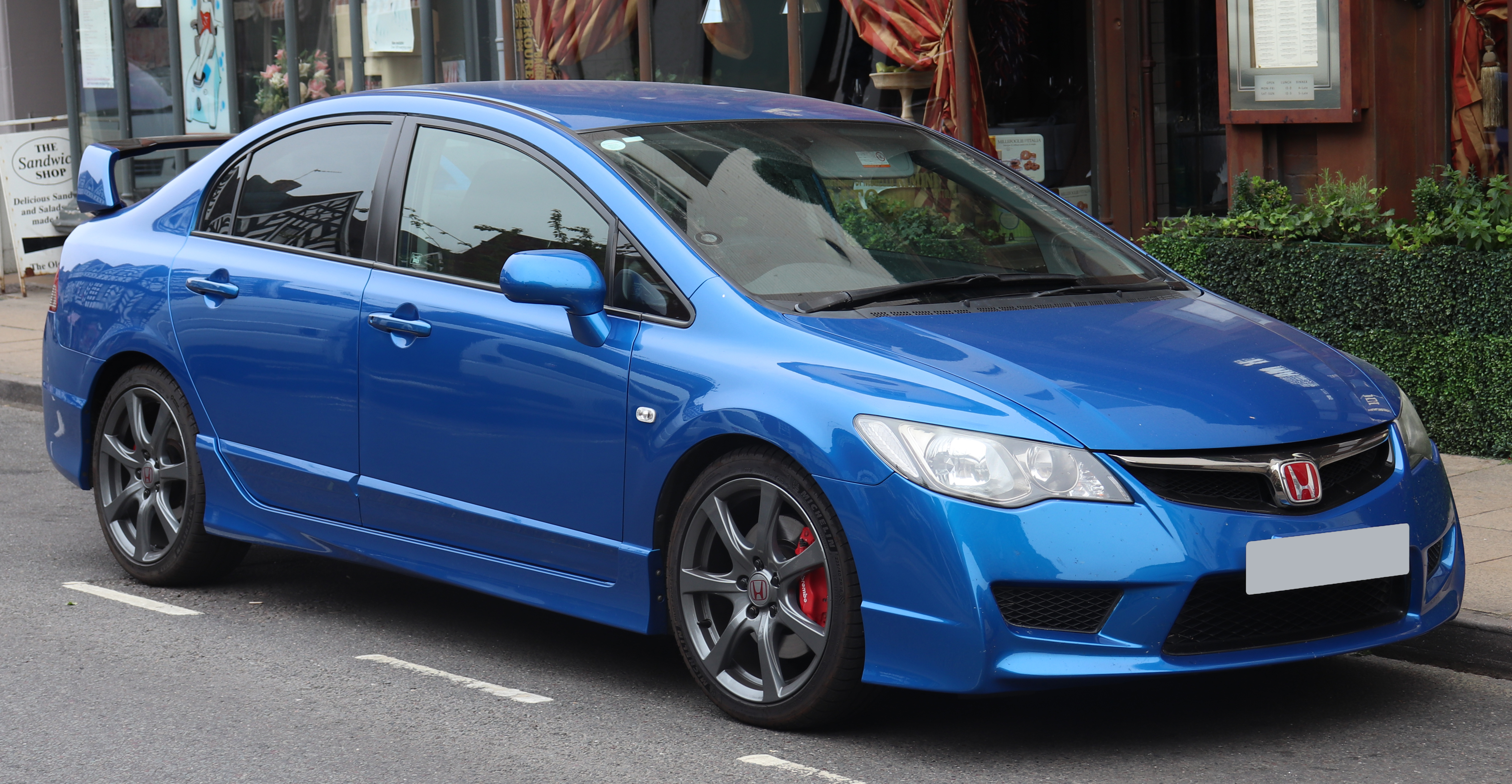

Overview
- Model code: FD2
- Production: 2007–2011
- Assembly: Japan: Suzuka, Mie
- Designer: Mitsuru Kariya

Body and chassis
- Body style: 4-door sedan

Powertrain
- Engine: 2.0 L K20A i-VTEC I4
- Power output: 225 PS (165 kW; 222 hp)
- Transmission: 6-speed manual

Dimensions
- Wheelbase: 2,700 mm (106.3 in)
- Length: 4,540–4,570 mm (178.7–179.9 in)
- Width: 1,770–1,780 mm (69.7–70.1 in)
- Height: 1,420–1,430 mm (55.9–56.3 in)
- Curb weight: 1,255–1,270 kg (2,767–2,800 lb)

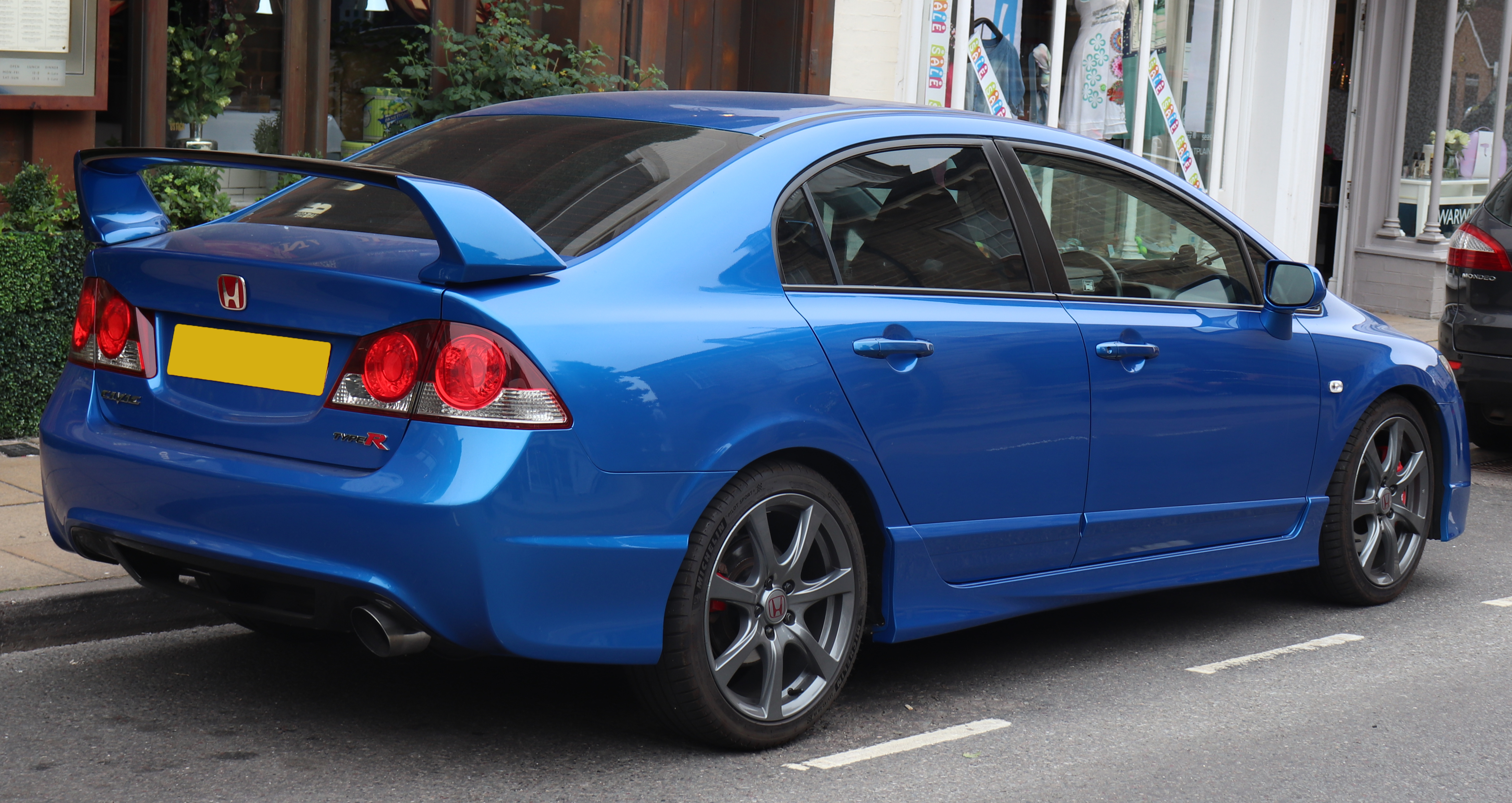
Rear

The Japanese market Civic Type R (FD2) went on sale on 30 March 2007. For the first time, the JDM Civic Type R was sold as a four-door sedan, rather than a three-door hatchback. The FD2 Type R was bigger, wider, and heavier than the EP3 Type R. The wheelbase grew from 2,570 mm (101.2 in) to 2,700 mm (106.3 in), giving the FD2 more stability during high-speed cornering. The Japanese model's engine power output is higher than the European versions, with 225 PS (165 kW; 222 hp) being generated at 8,000 rpm and 215 N⋅m (159 lb⋅ft) of torque peaking at 6,100 rpm (versus 201 PS (148 kW; 198 hp) at 7,800 rpm and 193 N⋅m (142 lb⋅ft) at 5,600 rpm for the European model). Honda quoted that mid-range is increased by 10 PS (7 kW; 10 hp). Power is sent to the front wheels through a close-ratio six-speed manual transmission, and a helical limited-slip differential is fitted as standard. The front brake discs are 320 mm (12.6 in) diameter and fitted with four-piston Brembo calipers. The car is fitted with Bridgestone Potenza RE070 tires in size 225/40 R18.

Honda claims the chassis is 50% more rigid than the previous Japan-only pre-facelift DC5 Integra Type R and 25% more rigid than the previous Japan-only facelift DC5 Integra Type R. The FD2 features an independent rear suspension rather than the torsion beam configuration used on the FN2 Type R. To save weight, aluminium is used extensively and bonded with adhesive instead of welded. Though the chassis is larger and more rigid than the JDM Integra Type R, it is only 70 kg (154 lb) heavier.

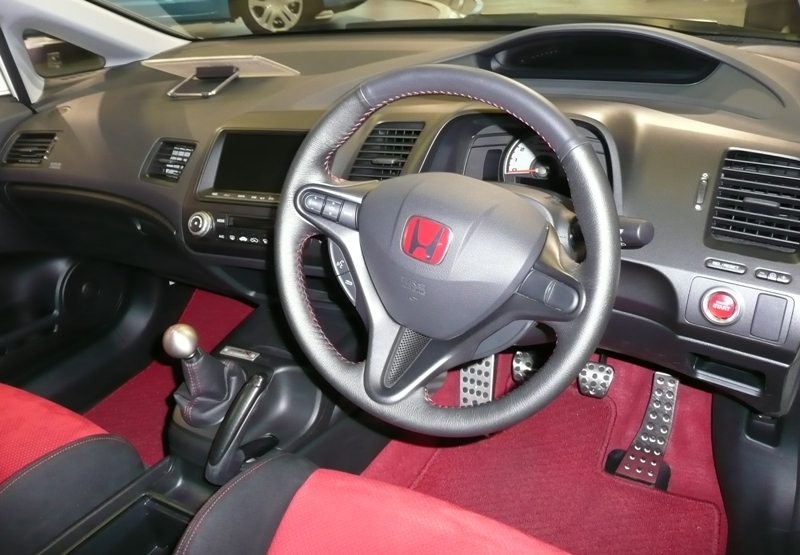
Interior

Exterior-wise, the front bumper is wider and different from the standard Civic, with an aerodynamic design. The rear bumper features a built-in diffuser, and a large rear wing completes the aero package. Inside, the trademark black-and-red bucket seats are no longer made by Recaro as in previous versions, but are designed in-house by Honda. Also gone is the Momo- made steering wheel, replaced instead by a Honda-made version. The familiar red-on-black or black-on-black color scheme is offered on Championship White and Super Platinum Metallic Silver, while a black-on-black scheme with red stitching is available only on the Vivid Blue Pearl model.

In October 2008, the Type R received new colors: Premium White Pearl, Premium Deep Violet Pearl, and Crystal Black Pearl. The Vivid Blue Pearl color was dropped.

In back to back tests, the Civic Type R (FD2) was on average 1 second quicker than the Integra Type R (DC5) at the Tsukuba Circuit and four seconds faster at the longer Suzuka Circuit.

In a back-to-back test on the United Kingdom TV program Fifth Gear, the FD2 Type R was three seconds quicker than the equivalent FN2 UK version around Castle Combe Circuit in wet conditions. However, the FN2 managed a 13.1 second quarter mile pass at Killarney Raceway.

A total of 14,062 FD2 Civic Type R units were produced until production ceased in August 2010 due to failure to meet the upcoming emission requirements. Following the previous success of the FN2 Civic Type R introduced in Europe in 2009, another batch of FN2 Type R with minor updates became available in Japan from fall 2010. However, the engine was the same K20Z4 straight-4 as used in the European version.

==== Civic Mugen RR (ABA-FD2) ====
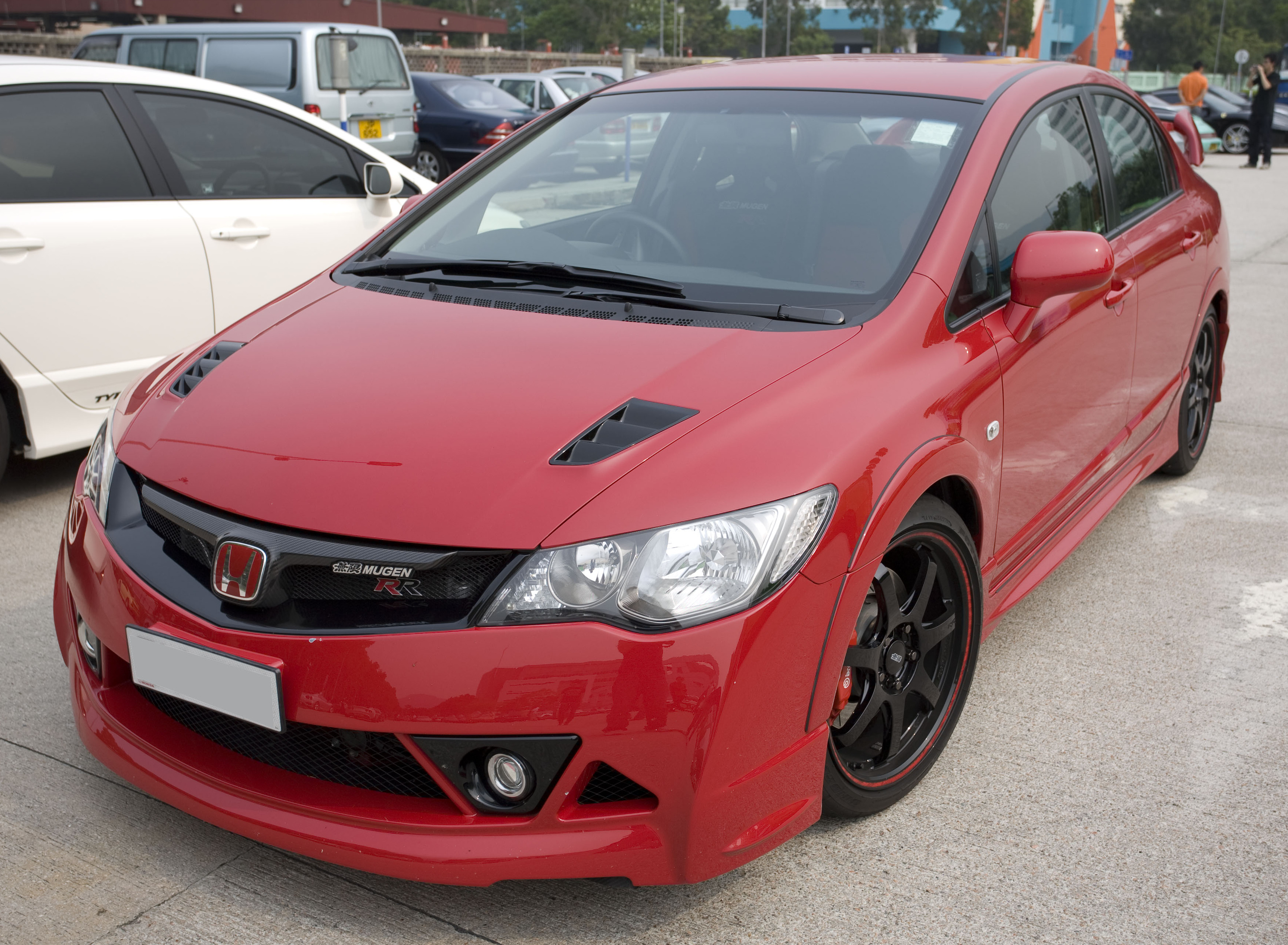
Honda Civic Mugen RR

In addition to the Civic Type R, 300 units of Honda Civic Mugen RR cars available exclusively in Milano Red were also produced for the Japanese market, which reduced weight to 1,255 kg (2,767 lb) using carbon fiber bumpers and aluminum for the hood. The engine is rated at 240 PS (177 kW; 237 hp) at 8,000 rpm and 218 N⋅m (161 lb⋅ft) torque at 7,000 rpm, achieved through Mugen parts such as camshafts, exhaust system, and ECU. Other exclusive items include Recaro SP-X racing bucket seats and other Mugen interior items, while special 18-inch Mugen 7-spoke wheels come standard. It went on sale in Japan on 13 September 2007.

Mugen also debuted the Civic Type-RR Experimental Spec concept car at the 2008 Tokyo Auto Salon, which featured a 2,157 cc (2.2 L) K20A engine rated at 260 PS (191 kW; 256 hp) at 8250 rpm and torque of 237 N⋅m (175 lb⋅ft) at 6,750 rpm. Weight is further reduced by an aluminium hood (4.6 kg (10 lb)) and a new titanium exhaust system (7.6 kg (17 lb)). The interior was also updated with additional carbon-fiber parts. The car also features the Intelligent-Tire Condition Monitoring System (i-TCMS) and Recaro seats.

The Honda Civic Mugen RR Advanced Concept debuted at the 2009 Tokyo Auto Salon and was based on the facelifted FD2. It has a dry weight of 1,095 kg (2,414 lb). Brake disc size was increased to 340 mm (13.4 in) diameter (as compared to 320 mm (12.6 in) in Type R/RR).

==== Civic Mugen RC (2008) ====
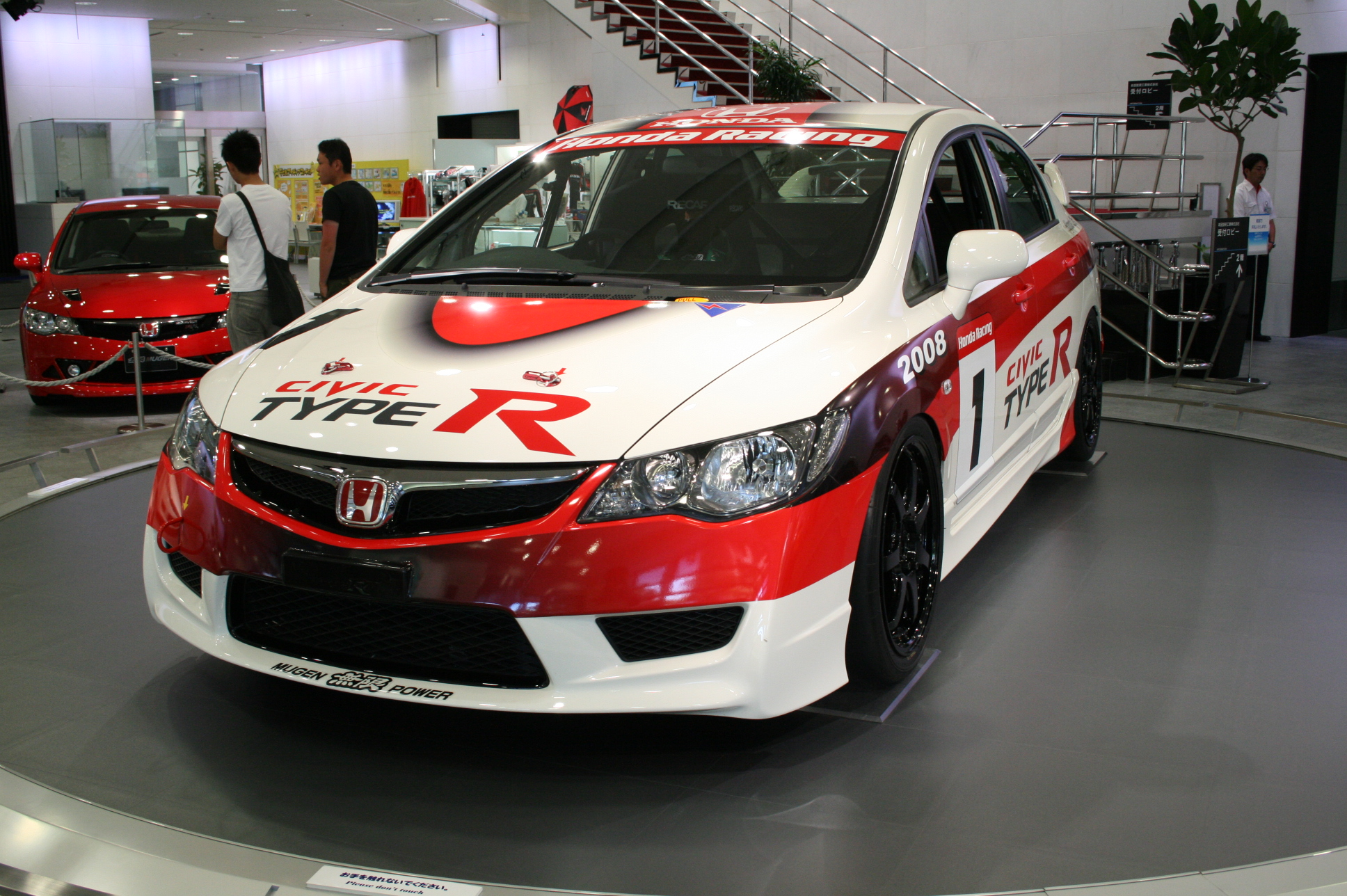
Honda Civic Mugen RC

A race version called Honda Civic Mugen RC was developed by Mugen for the 2008 Honda Exciting Cup Civic One-Make Race-Civic Series. The engine is the stock K20A engine from FD2 Honda Civic Type R. It came in the following models:

- Basic
- Standard: It adds a racing wheel package (Mugen RC 18-inch wheel with Yokohama tire), brake package (front and rear brake pads), seat and steering (Recaro bucket seat, seat rail, steering wheel with box, TAKATA harness), carbon inner part option A (carbon fiber right floor cover panel, footrest, door lining).
- Complete: It adds carbon inner part option B (carbon-fiber console box, left floor cover panel, center pillar cover), engine package (engine rebalancing and calibration).

The Civic Mugen RC was built in Mugen's M-TEC factory.

=== FN2 (European and international version) ===
Third generation (Europe and international)
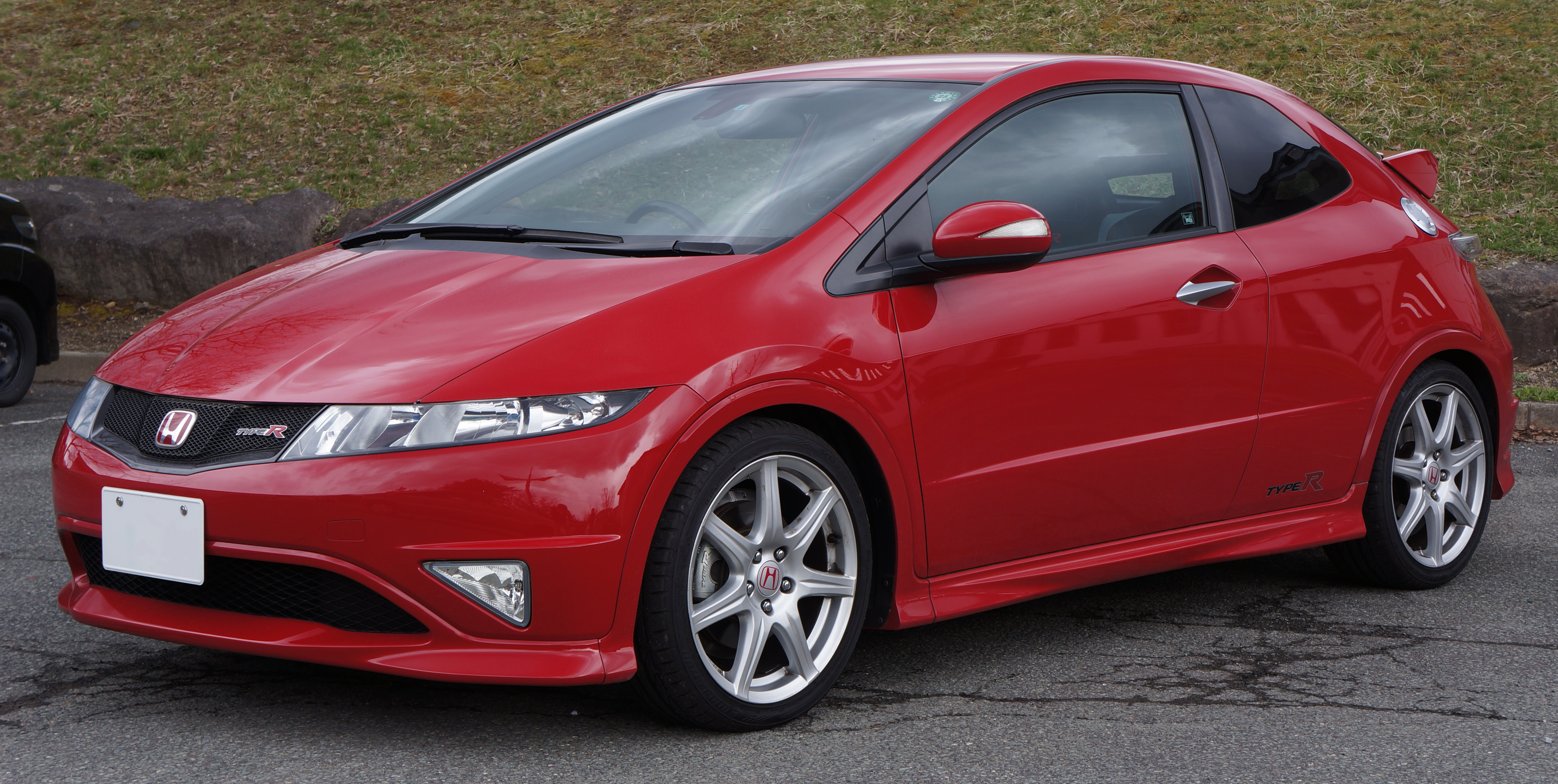

Overview
- Model code: FN2
- Production: 2007–2011
- Assembly: United Kingdom: Swindon (Honda UK)

Body and chassis
- Body style: 3-door hatchback

Powertrain
- Engine: 2.0 L K20Z4 i-VTEC I4
- Power output: 201 PS (148 kW; 198 hp)
- Transmission: 6-speed manual

Dimensions
- Wheelbase: 2,620 mm (103.1 in)
- Length: 4,270 mm (168.1 in)
- Width: 1,785 mm (70.3 in)
- Height: 1,445 mm (56.9 in)
- Curb weight: 1,263–1,320 kg (2,784–2,910 lb)

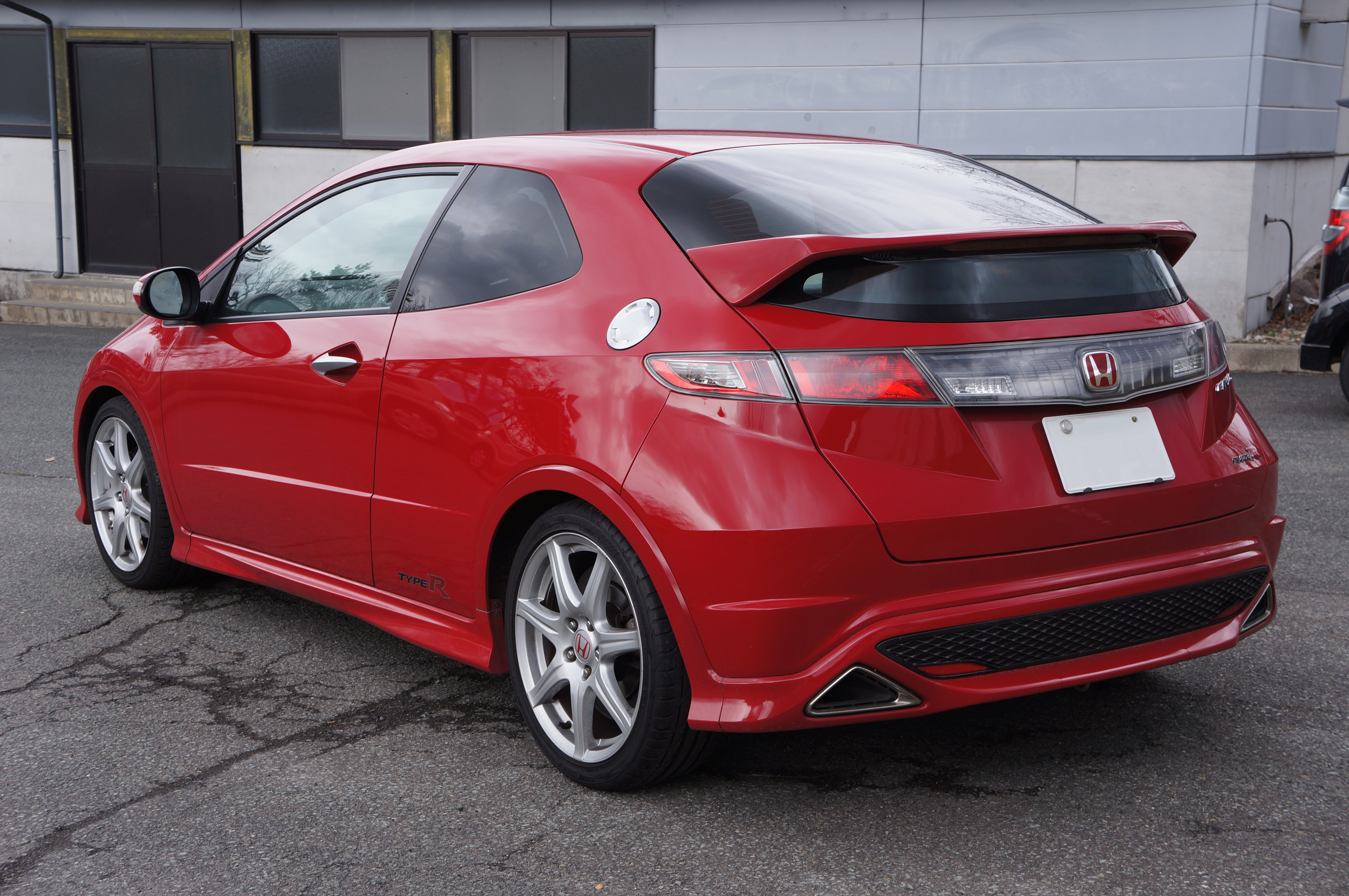
Civic Type R (FN2)

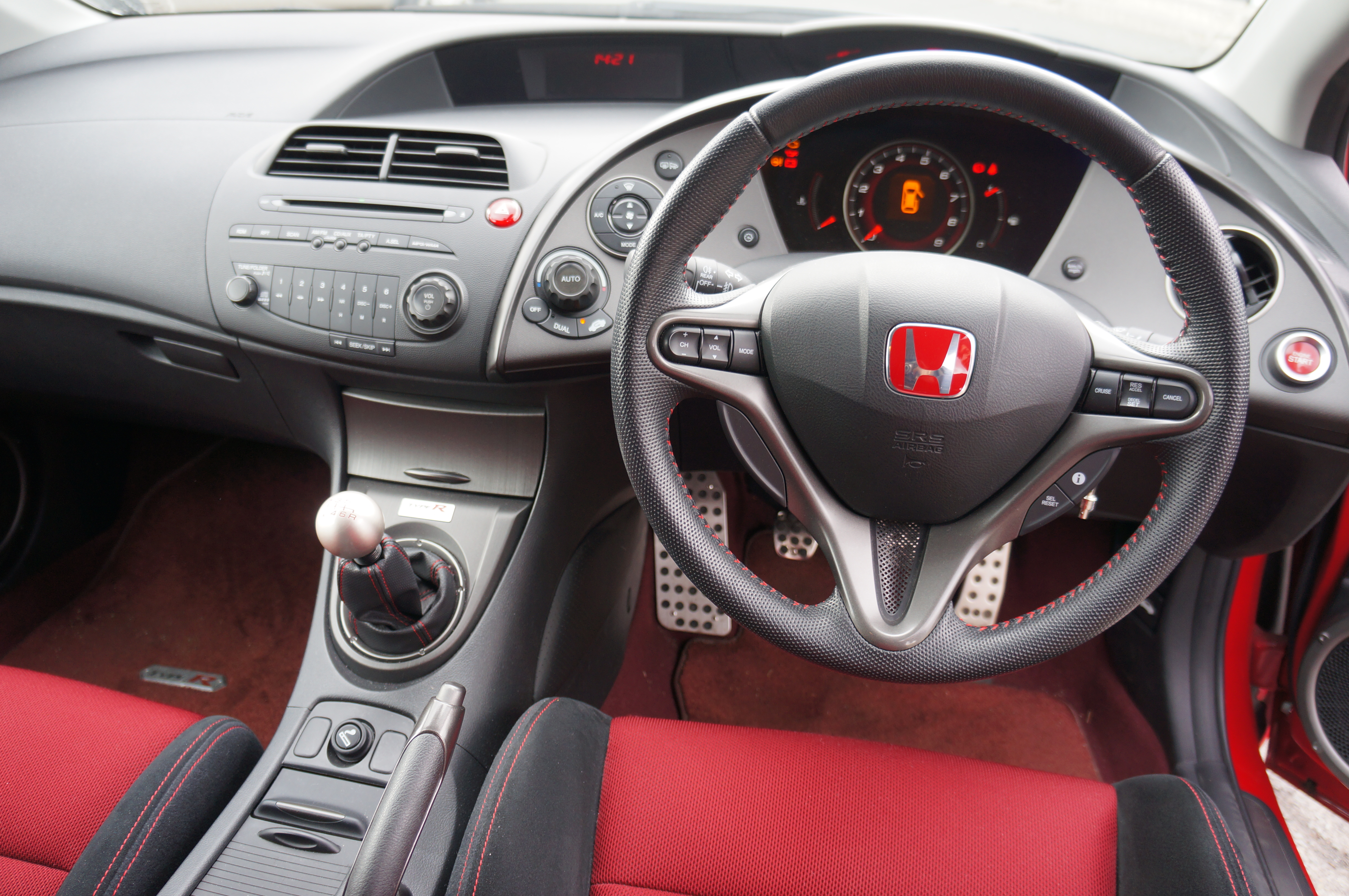
Interior

The European and international market Civic Type R is offered only as a three-door hatchback and uses a different chassis and interior layout (notably, the fuel tank is placed below the driver's seat). The rear suspension, formerly a double wishbone setup, was replaced with a simpler torsion beam axle. The drive train is largely the same as the predecessor, offering 201 PS (148 kW; 198 hp) at 7,800 rpm and 193 N⋅m (142 lb⋅ft) of torque at 5,600 rpm, with 90 percent of peak torque is available from 2,500 rpm. The car is fitted with 225/40 R18 Y88 Bridgestone Potenza RE050A tires, while optional 19-inch Rage alloys fitted with Yokohama Advan Sport 225/35 ZR19 88Y tires were also available. The car has a curb weight of 1,320 kg (2,910 lb). A total of 29,039 Type R specification FN2 models were built at the Honda factory in Swindon, 13,514 RHD for the UK, 8,378 LHD for Europe, 3,510 for Japan, 2,285 for Australia, with the remaining units heading to the Africa and Asia regions.

==== Trims ====
Type R GT
From its introduction in 2007, the Type R GT trim includes dual-zone climate control (left/right independent), rain-sensing windscreen wipers, refrigerated glove box, automatic headlights with dusk sensor, front fog lights, power-folding wing mirrors, cruise control, front and rear curtain airbags. In the UK market from the 2009 model year, GT models also gained HID headlights with auto-levelling, headlight washers with switch, USB and AUX connectors located in the armrest storage area, as well as a multi-LED high-level rear brake light to replace the previous design. An LSD was fitted to all GT models from April 2010 production also (this was never made available on base Type R models)

FN2 Type R's were finished in the same four colors as the standard FN2, and a new color, Deep Sapphire Blue Pearl, was added to the lineup in 2010; at the same time, Deep Bronze Metallic was dropped. Only 226 examples of the Deep Sapphire Blue Pearl were built in Type R specification, 114 for the UK and 112 for Europe.

In 2009, the Championship White Edition Type R was made available, adding a Helical LSD to the Type R GT feature roster, along with trim items such as a dark-tinted front grille and fuel filler cap, and color-matched white wheels.

Type R Heritage
As is often the case, names and trims vary even within domain markets, down to local ones, and a Heritage trim replaces the GT version in some of them, adding Xenon/HID lights to the mix. The Heritage's infotainment system adds a Bluetooth telephone system, voice recognition, DVD, and satellite navigation. This model was not offered in the UK.

Type R Race
A more radical trim dubbed Race differs from the Heritage by removing components (incl. HID, AC, fog lights, audio system, soundproofing, some airbags) to reduce weight as much as 40 kg (88 lb).

Type R (Aust)
The Type R (Australasia) trim includes dual-zone climate control (left/right independent), rain-sensing windscreen wipers, refrigerated glove box, front fog lights, power-folding wing mirrors, cruise control, CD/radio/apple integration, front and rear curtain airbags. It is finished in the same four colors as the Euro standard FN2.

=== Mugen editions ===
In selected markets, Honda offered limited or dealer-installed performance upgrades developed by Mugen, including the Mugen 200 and Mugen M20 variants of the FN2 Civic Type R. These models were positioned as more focused versions of the standard Type R, incorporating a combination of mechanical, aerodynamic, and cosmetic enhancements.

The Mugen 200 was a limited-production model developed for the European market, featuring revised engine management calibration, a performance exhaust system, upgraded suspension components, and Mugen aerodynamic bodywork, including a front splitter, side skirts, and rear spoiler. The modifications were intended to improve high-speed stability and overall responsiveness while retaining road usability.

The Mugen M20 was a similar market-specific package offered in very limited numbers through select Honda dealerships. It featured a comparable set of Mugen performance upgrades, including chassis tuning, lightweight alloy wheels, and interior and exterior Mugen branding elements. As with other Mugen-developed FN2 variants, the focus was on refining handling characteristics and enhancing the vehicle’s track-oriented performance without fundamentally altering the base K20Z4 engine architecture.

Both Mugen variants were produced in very limited quantities and were not part of the standard Honda Civic Type R production range; instead, they were niche, factory-supported tuning packages tailored for enthusiasts in specific regions.

Production for the European market ended in October 2010 because the engine did not meet Euro V emissions regulations, which took effect in 2011. Over 12,000 Civic Type Rs have been sold in the UK since January 2007; Honda continued to export the car to the Australian market until 2011. It was also exported to Japan and marketed as Civic Type R EURO in a limited edition in fall 2010, following a successful run in November 2009.

==== Reception ====
Top Gear Magazine awarded the European Civic Type R its 'Hot Hatch of 2007', praising the car's controls and comparing it favorably as a driver's car to its rivals, the Stig qualifying it as 'an utter gem'. However the television show Top Gear later criticized the new FN2 Chassis version, due to the different suspension and added weight. Jeremy Clarkson said it "just doesn't feel that quick" and that "all the poise and controllability that you used to get in the old car is just sort of... gone".

==== Markets ====
Australia
The FN2 Civic Type R was available in Australia from mid-2007 until 2011.

Singapore
In Singapore, the FN2 Civic Type R Hatchback (European version) was sold by authorized dealer, while the FD2 sedan was sold through parallel importers.

Malaysia
The FD2 Civic Type R was officially launched in the Malaysian market in August 2007. It was the first time Honda launched a Type R JDM outside of Japan.

Japan
The FD2 sedan was initially the only model available in Japan, but as of November 2009, Honda imported the European FN2 hatchback in limited numbers of about 2,010 units, giving it the name Civic Type R EURO. A second batch of 1,500 was imported back to Japan in 2010, with the color Crystal Black Pearl added. All Civic Type R EURO are equipped with LSD from standard.

== FK2 (2015; based on ninth generation Civic) ==
Fourth generation
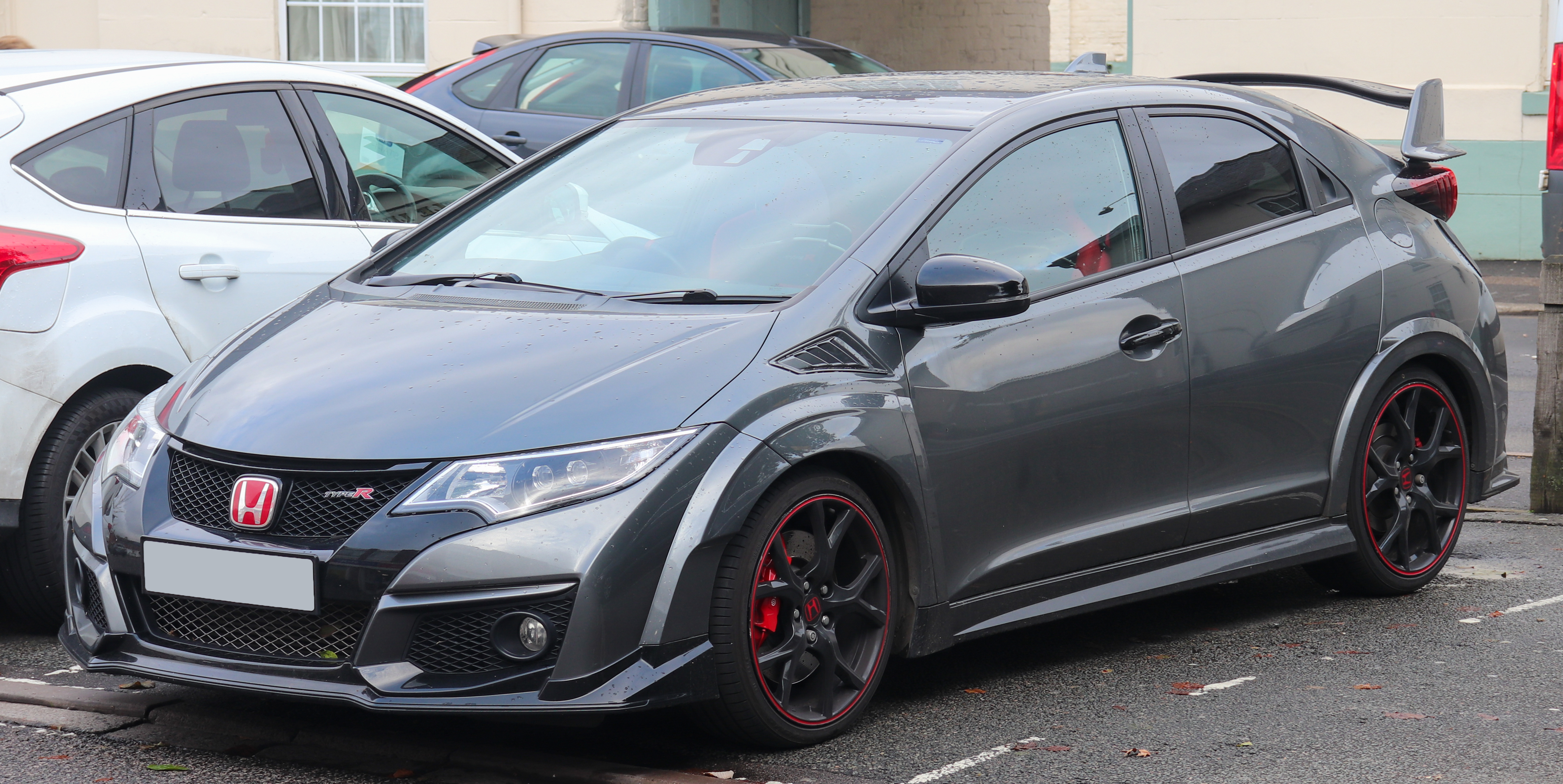

Overview
- Model code: FK2
- Production: 2015–2017
- Assembly: United Kingdom: Swindon (Honda UK)
- Designer: Hisayuki Yagi

Body and chassis
- Body style: 5-door hatchback

Powertrain
- Engine: 2.0 L (1,996 cc) K20C1 turbo VTEC I4
- Power output: 310 PS (228 kW; 306 hp)
- Transmission: 6-speed manual

Dimensions
- Wheelbase: 2,600 mm (102.4 in)
- Length: 4,390 mm (172.8 in)
- Width: 1,880 mm (74.0 in)
- Height: 1,460 mm (57.5 in)
- Curb weight: 1,380 kg (3,042.4 lb)

In September 2012, there were rumors about the confirmation of the next-generation Honda Civic Type R at the Paris Motor Show. A preview took place at the Geneva Motor Show in March 2014.

=== Production ===
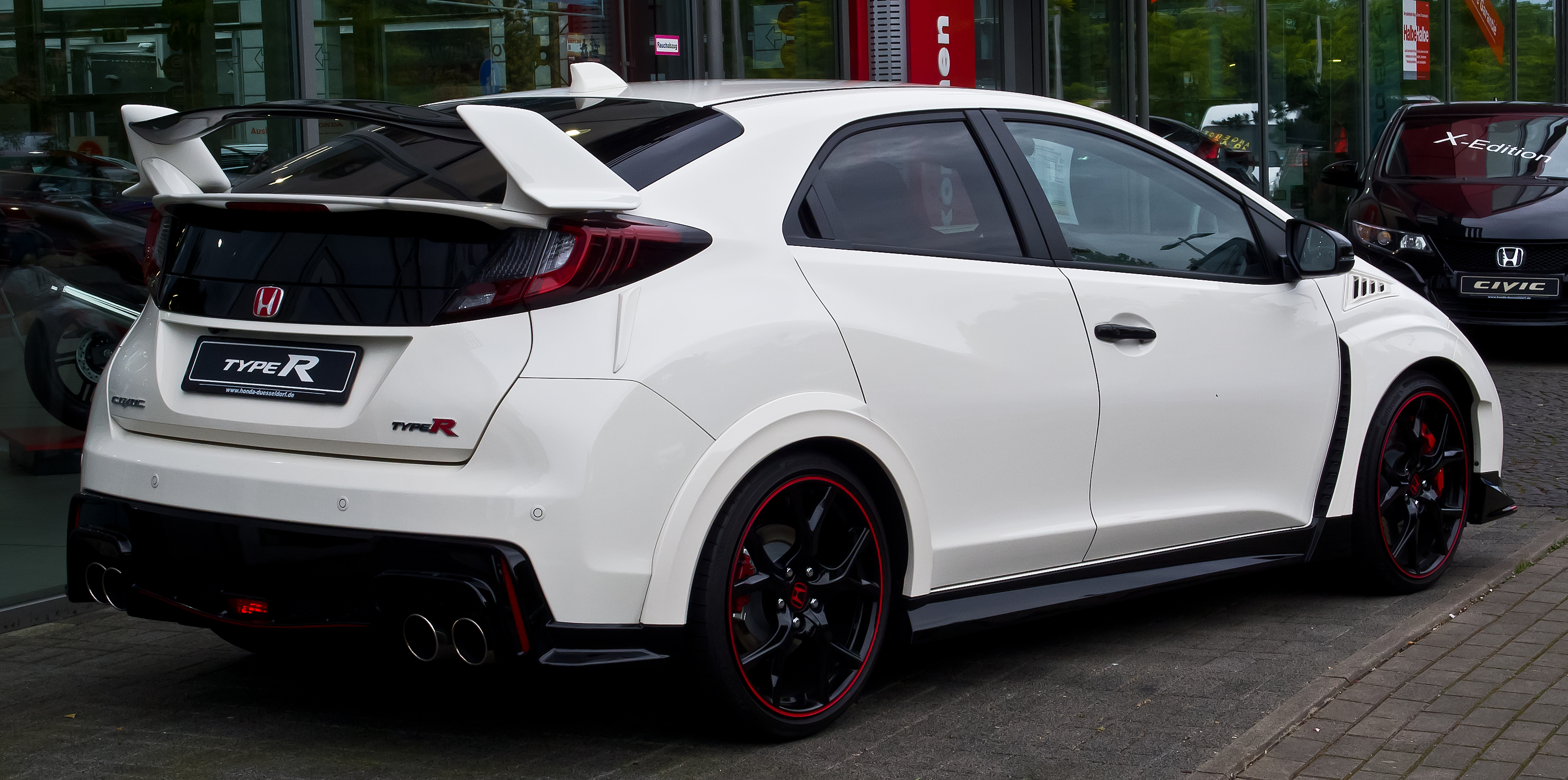
Civic Type R (FK2)

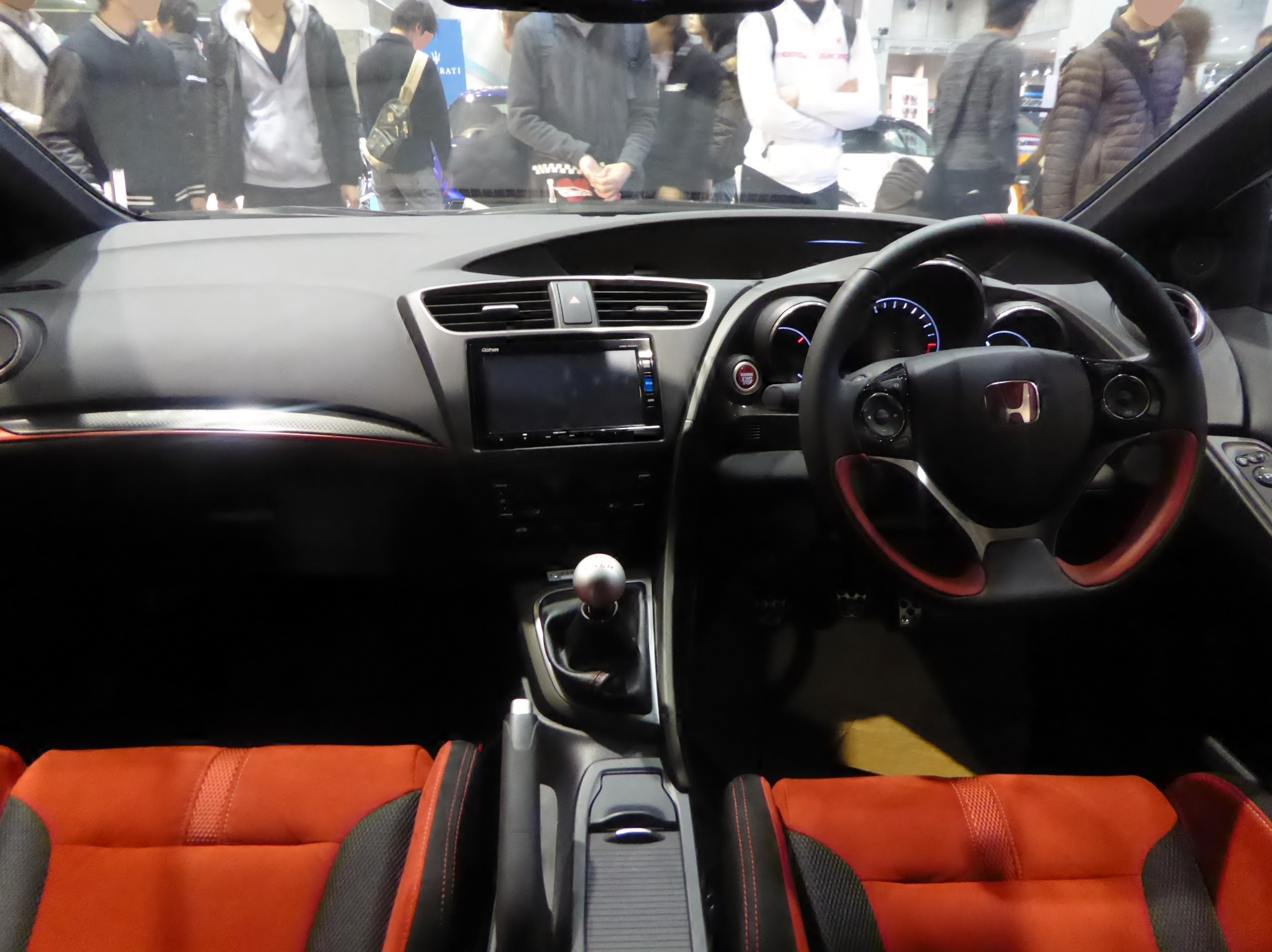
Interior

In January 2015, Honda announced that the production-ready model of the fourth-generation Civic Type R (coded FK2) would debut at the 85th Geneva Motor Show in March, alongside the European debut of the NSX. It was the first factory turbocharged Civic Type R.

=== Design and differences from prototype ===
The prototype version of the FK2 Civic Type R, first shown at the 2014 Geneva Motor Show, differed from the final production model in several respects. The concept featured exaggerated aerodynamic elements, including a larger rear wing, wider fender arches, and a deeper front splitter, giving it a more aggressive appearance. The production FK2, revealed in 2015, retained the general design language but adopted a more restrained aerodynamic package optimized for road use and regulatory compliance. Notably, the production model featured repositioned exhaust outlets and slightly reduced wing dimensions to improve rear visibility. Suspension geometry, ride height, and engine calibration were also refined to balance performance with comfort and usability.

The FK2 was available in 5 colours: Milano Red, Brilliant Sporty Blue Metallic, Crystal Black Pearl, Championship White and Polished Metal Metallic.

=== Performance and chassis ===
The FK2 Civic Type R is powered by the K20C1 direct fuel injection 1,996 cc (2.0 L; 121.8 cu in) turbocharged inline-four engine with Earth Dreams Technology, producing 310 PS (228 kW; 306 hp) at 6,500 rpm and 400 N⋅m (295 lb⋅ft) of torque between 2,500 and 4,500 rpm. The engine is paired with a 6-speed manual transmission and a factory-fitted plate-type limited-slip differential. Honda claimed that the Type R could accelerate from 0–100 km/h (62 mph) in 5.7 seconds. The engines were manufactured at Honda’s Anna Engine Plant in Ohio, United States, before being exported to the United Kingdom for assembly.

The FK2 engine uses a single-scroll turbocharger with an integrated exhaust manifold, designed to improve exhaust gas flow and reduce turbo lag. Peak boost pressure is approximately 1.5 bar depending on operating conditions and market calibration. The engine redline is around 7,000 rpm, with a hard limiter set shortly thereafter.

The drivetrain is front-engine, front-wheel drive (FF layout), with Honda implementing revised suspension geometry and a helical limited-slip differential to reduce torque steer and improve traction under hard acceleration.

The FK2 uses a MacPherson strut front suspension with reinforced knuckles, while the rear employs a torsion-beam suspension setup. The chassis was significantly stiffened over the standard Civic hatchback through additional bracing and structural reinforcement to improve high-speed stability and cornering response.

Braking is provided by Brembo components, with 350 mm ventilated front discs and 4-piston fixed calipers, and 305 mm rear discs with single-piston sliding calipers.

The FK2 was fitted with Continental tyres developed specifically for the model in collaboration with Honda. The standard specification was 235/35 ZR19 91Y Continental ContiSportContact 5P tyres on 19-inch alloy wheels, with later production models in some markets receiving Continental ContiSportContact 6 tyres. The tyres were engineered to complement the FK2’s chassis rigidity and torque delivery, with an emphasis on steering precision, dry grip, and high-speed stability while maintaining wet-weather performance.

The fuel tank has a capacity of 50 L (13 US gal) and fuel consumption is 30.1/46.3 mpg (5–7.8 L/100 km), with a combined figure of 38.7 mpg (6 L/100 km). Combined CO2 emissions are 170 g/km, and the car meets Euro 6 emission standards.[citation needed]

=== Records ===
The FK2 Civic Type R was notable for setting a Nürburgring Nordschleife lap record for front-wheel-drive cars prior to its launch. In May 2014, a development version of the FK2 completed the 20.8 km (12.9 mi) circuit in 7 minutes 50.63 seconds, making it the fastest production-spec front-wheel-drive car at the time.

=== Safety ===
The Civic Type R is equipped with dual front airbags, front side airbags, and front and rear side curtain airbags. Larger brakes are fitted for improved stopping power, with 351 mm (13.8 in) ventilated and drilled discs at the front and 305 mm (12 in) solid discs at the rear. Anti-lock braking, electronic brake-force distribution, hill start assist, and vehicle stability assist are standard.

==== Mugen Type R concept ====
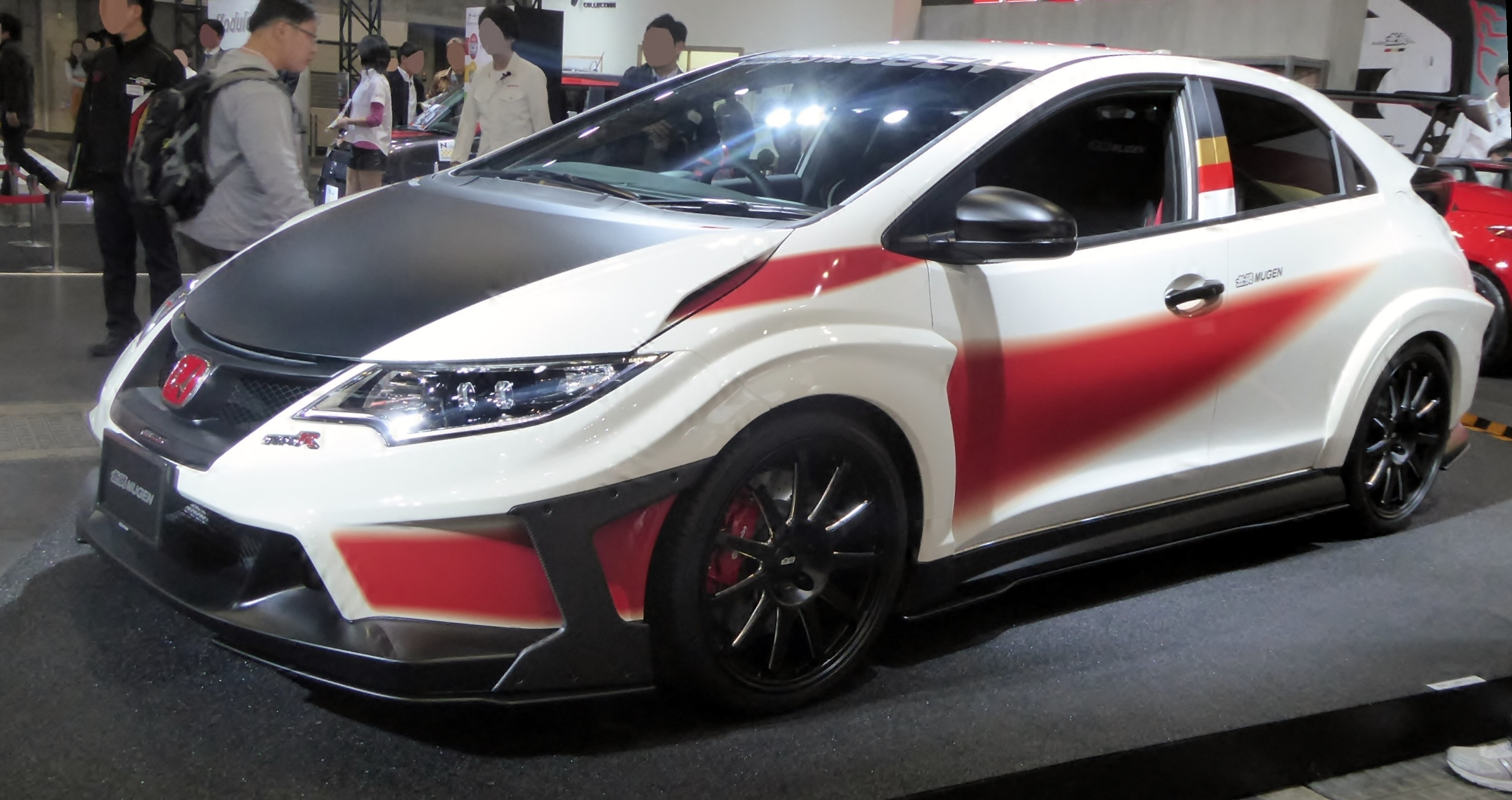
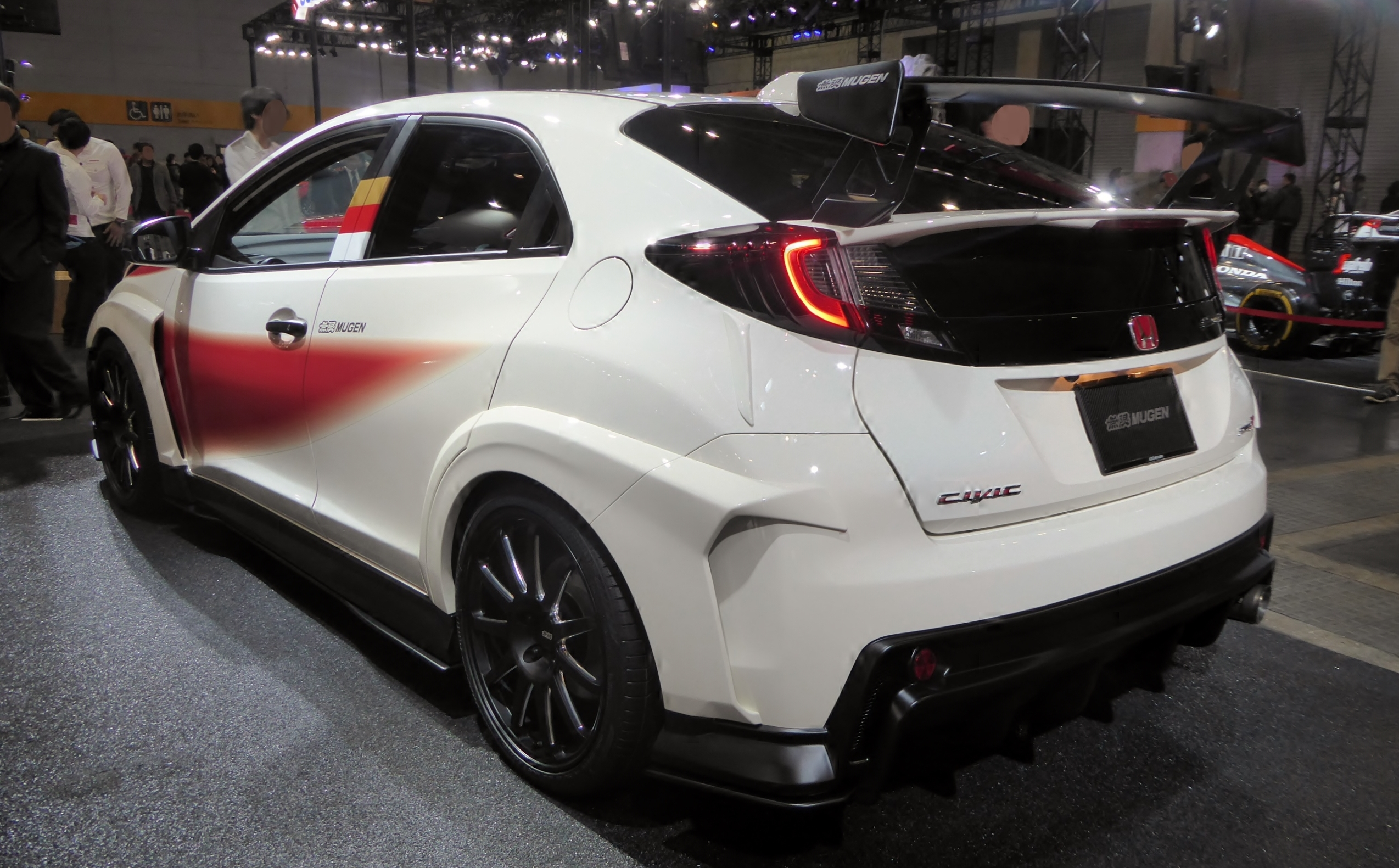
Mugen Civic Type R concept

Introduced at the 2016 Tokyo Auto Salon, the Mugen Civic Type R was an aerodynamic package for the FK2 Civic Type R. It included an adjustable front lip spoiler, front canards, side skirts, and a rear diffuser, all made from carbon fiber. The standard rear wing was replaced by a fixed GT-style spoiler, and a single-exit exhaust system was installed in place of the standard dual setup. There were no drivetrain modifications.

==== Special Editions ====
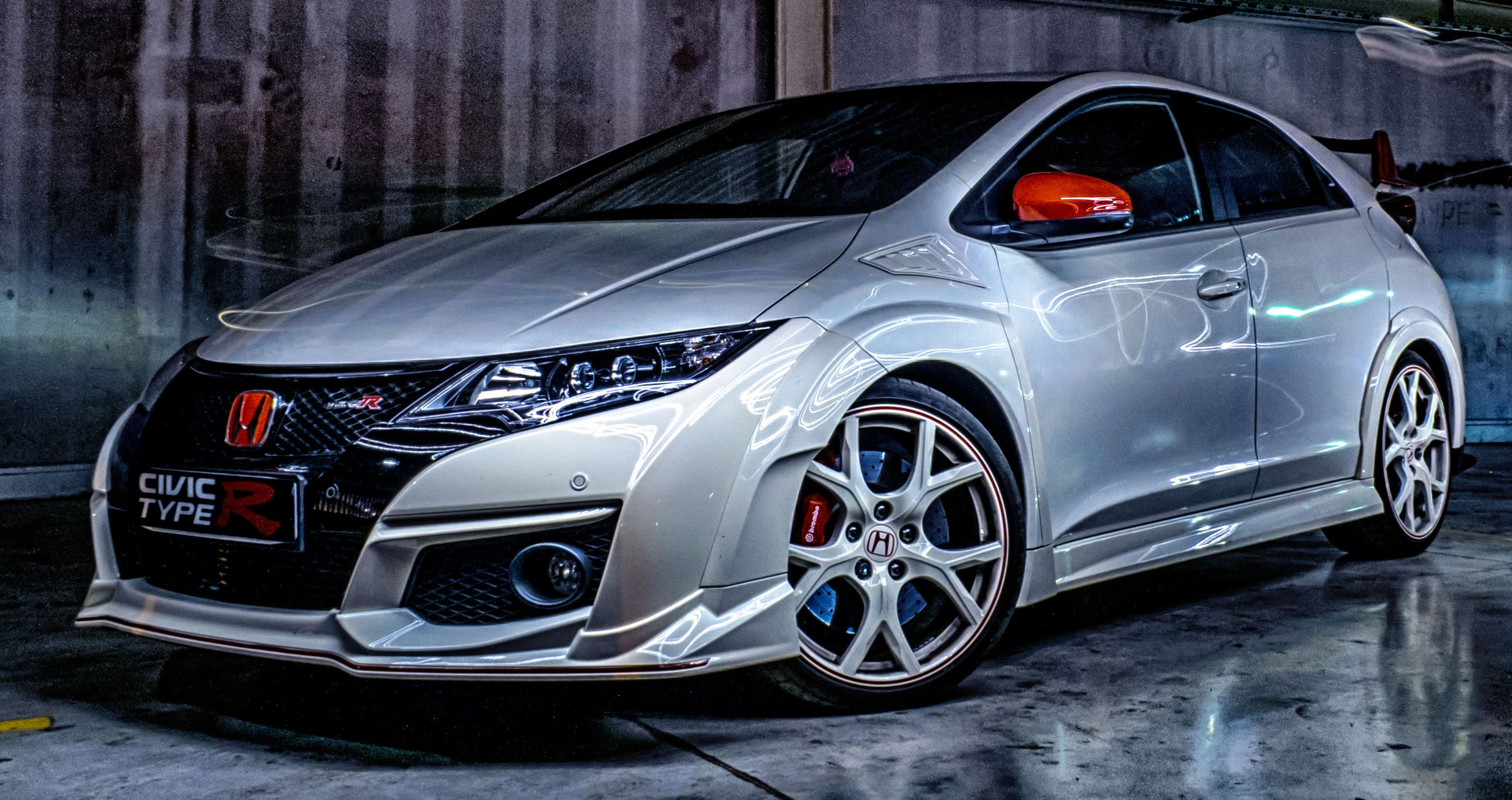
Civic Type R White Edition

A Special Edition (with unique R numbering) was introduced in Europe in May 2016, initially in left-hand drive configuration. A total of 300 units were finished in white and 150 in black, based on the GT trim. Notable features included black seats, red air vents, red mirror caps, red rear spoiler sides, and, on White Edition models, white front and side skirts, white door handles, and white wheels. At the end of 2016, the right-hand-drive Black Edition was released as a Final Edition, limited to 100 units in the United Kingdom. Overall, 550 Special Edition units were produced (450 LHD and 100 RHD).

In other European markets, a White Edition was also offered, based on the GT trim and mirroring the Black Edition specification but with white exterior accents.

=== Regions ===
==== United Kingdom ====
The FK2 was available in the UK from July 2015 in two variants: the base Type R and the Type R GT. Both shared identical performance figures, differing mainly in equipment levels and comfort features.

==== Japan ====
In July 2015, production at Swindon, England (HUM) began exporting the FK2 Civic Type R to Japan, marking the third Civic Type R to be sold there. Only 750 units were exported.

== FK8 (2017; based on tenth generation Civic) ==
Fifth generation
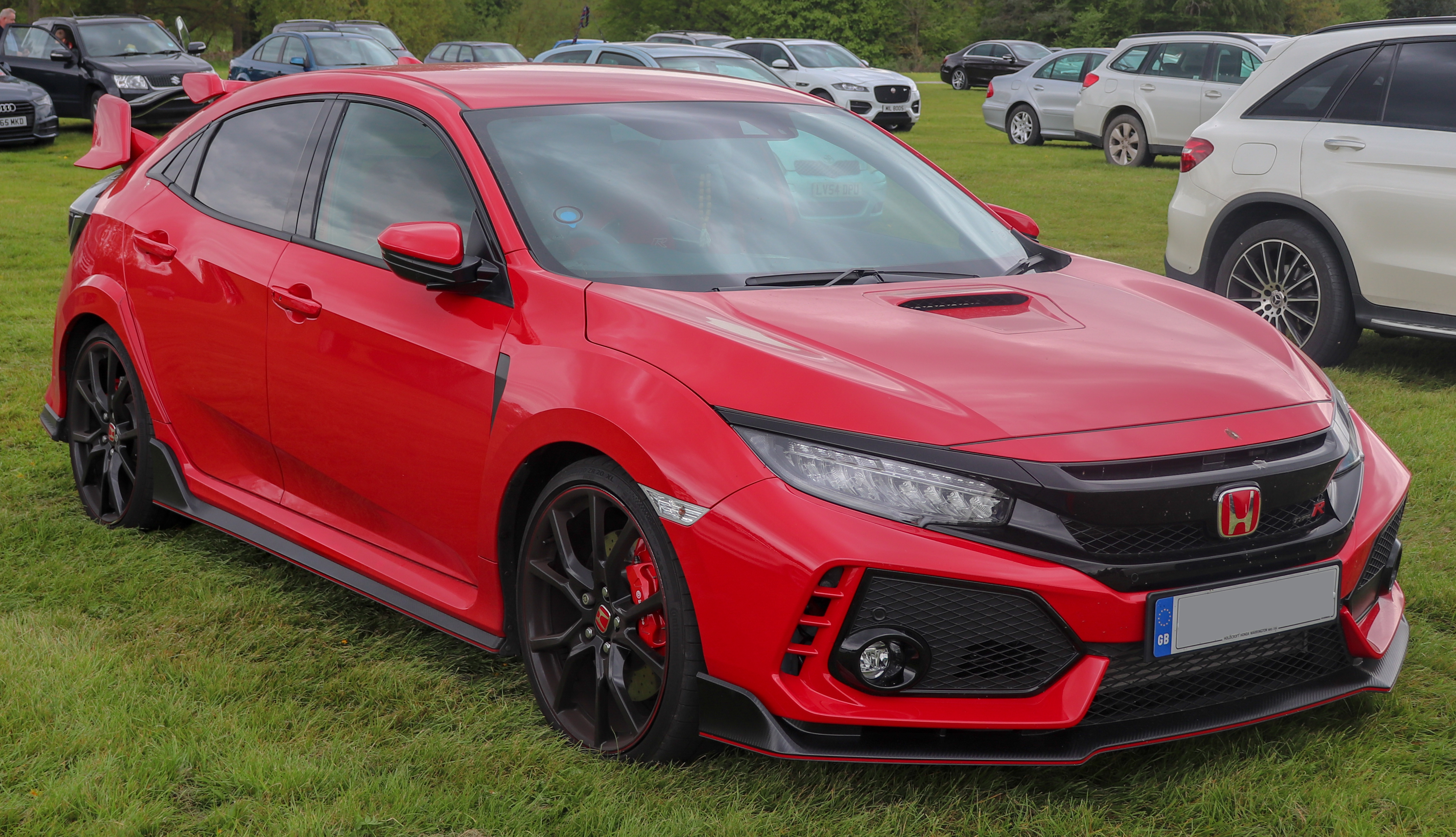
- Pre-facelift (2017–2019)

Overview
- Model code: FK8
- Production: 2017–2021
- Assembly: United Kingdom: Swindon (Honda UK)
- Designer: Daisuke Tsutamori; Hideki Kakinuma (project leader)

Body and chassis
- Body style: 5-door hatchback

Powertrain
- Engine: 1996 cc K20C1 VTEC turbo I4
- Power output: 310 PS (228 kW; 306 hp); 320 PS (235 kW; 316 hp) (Europe and Japan only)
- Transmission: 6-speed manual

Dimensions
- Wheelbase: 2,700 mm (106.3 in)
- Length: 4,560 mm (179.5 in)
- Width: 1,875 mm (73.8 in)
- Height: 1,435 mm (56.5 in)
- Curb weight: 1,380–1,390 kg (3,042.4–3,064.4 lb)

The Civic Type R Prototype was unveiled in September 2016 at the Paris Motor Show, and the production version was unveiled at the 2017 Geneva Motor Show. The new car builds on Honda's heritage in developing high-performance hatchbacks. Being based upon the FK8 generation of Civics which was designed as a global car, this made it easier to export the Type R to markets that already had the standard Civic hatchback available for sale.

The FK8 was built at Honda’s plant in Swindon, United Kingdom, and became the final Civic Type R to be produced there before the factory ceased vehicle production in 2021. The closure marked the end of Civic manufacturing in the UK after several decades of production.

=== Exterior ===
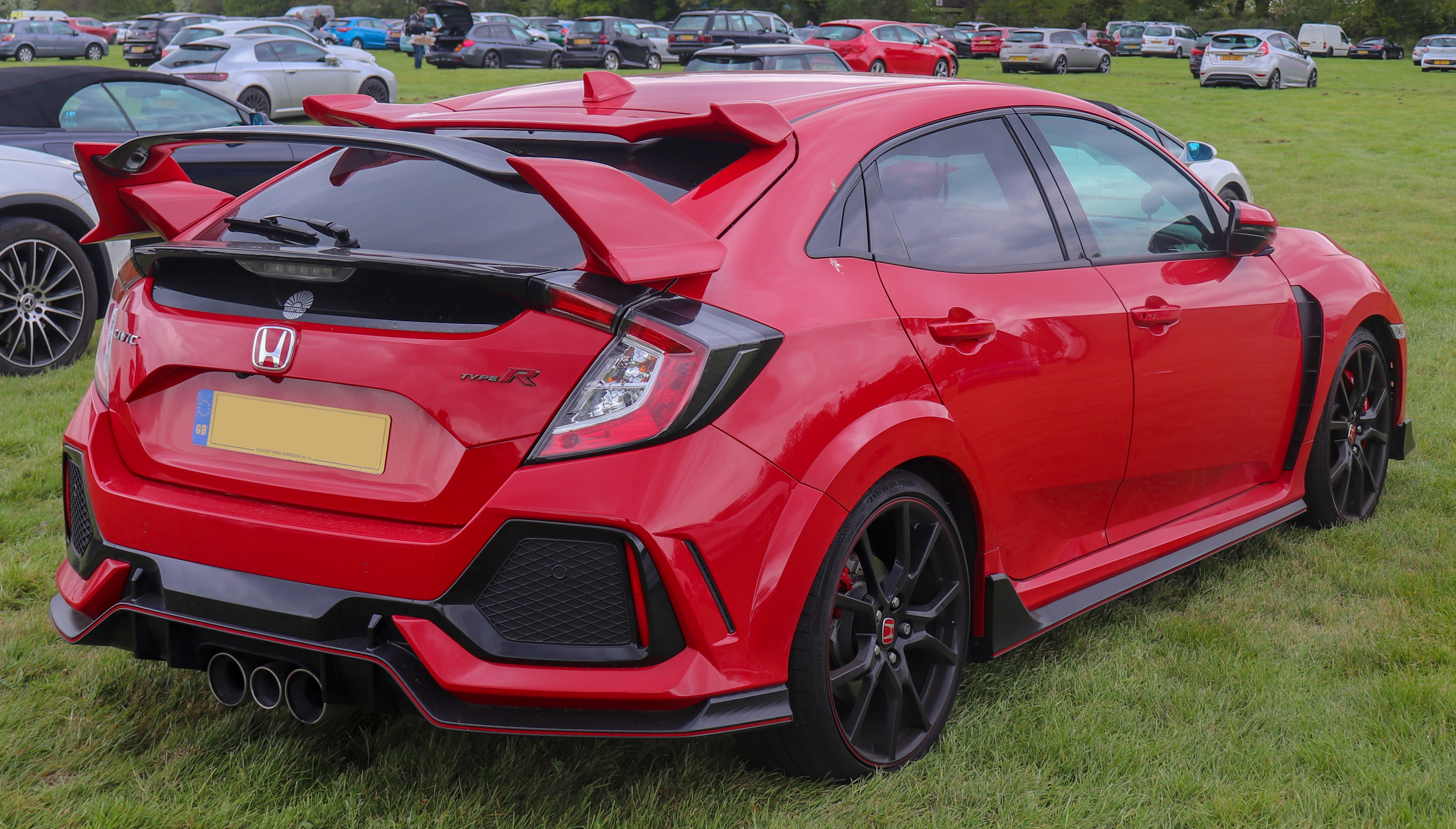
Pre-facelift (2017–2019)

The design is based on the Civic Hatchback, with a winged carbon fiber effect splitter with red accent line, slatted ducts, diamond-mesh air intakes, red 'H' badge above a new air vent at the nose of the car, new air intake on the hood, an air scoop sited centrally in a trapezoidal recess, smoked lenses for the LED headlights, indicators and side repeaters, carbon fiber effect side skirts, 20-inch piano black alloy wheels with red accents, 245/30 R20 high-performance tires, enlarged wheel arches, a carbon fiber effect diffuser which runs below the wider rear bumper, 3 tailpipes with a pair of directional strakes at each side, central tailpipe in bright metallic red and unique peaks at the roof flanks that point backward.

=== Engine and other specifications ===
The FK8 Civic Type R uses the same engine as its predecessor, a turbocharged inline-four with increased power to 320 PS (235 kW; 316 hp) in the European and Japanese versions but remains the same 310 PS (228 kW; 306 hp) in other markets. Both versions produce the same torque at 295 lb⋅ft (400 N⋅m). The engine is mated to a close-ratio 6-speed manual transmission, continuing the tradition of its predecessors, with a limited-slip differential as standard. The aerodynamic elements increase downforce even further as compared to the outgoing model. The FK8 has a top speed of 272 km/h (169 mph), which made it the fastest Civic Type R up to that point, and a claimed 0-62 mph (100 km/h) time of 5.7 seconds for the European and Japanese models. When tested by Car and Driver, they achieved a 0-60 mph (97 km/h) time of 4.9 seconds.

In back-to-back testing of the FK8 and FK2 Type R, reviewers praised the FK8's more compliant ride and improved steering feedback, while criticising the FK2's harsher suspension and less composed handling when the "+R" driving mode was activated. Reviewers also noted that the FK2's interior appeared dated, attributing this to its release near the end of the base model's production cycle. Some reviewers, however, stated that the FK2 felt the more "raw" and "visceral" of the two, offering a more analogue driving experience compared with the FK8's greater refinement and usability.

=== Interior and safety features ===
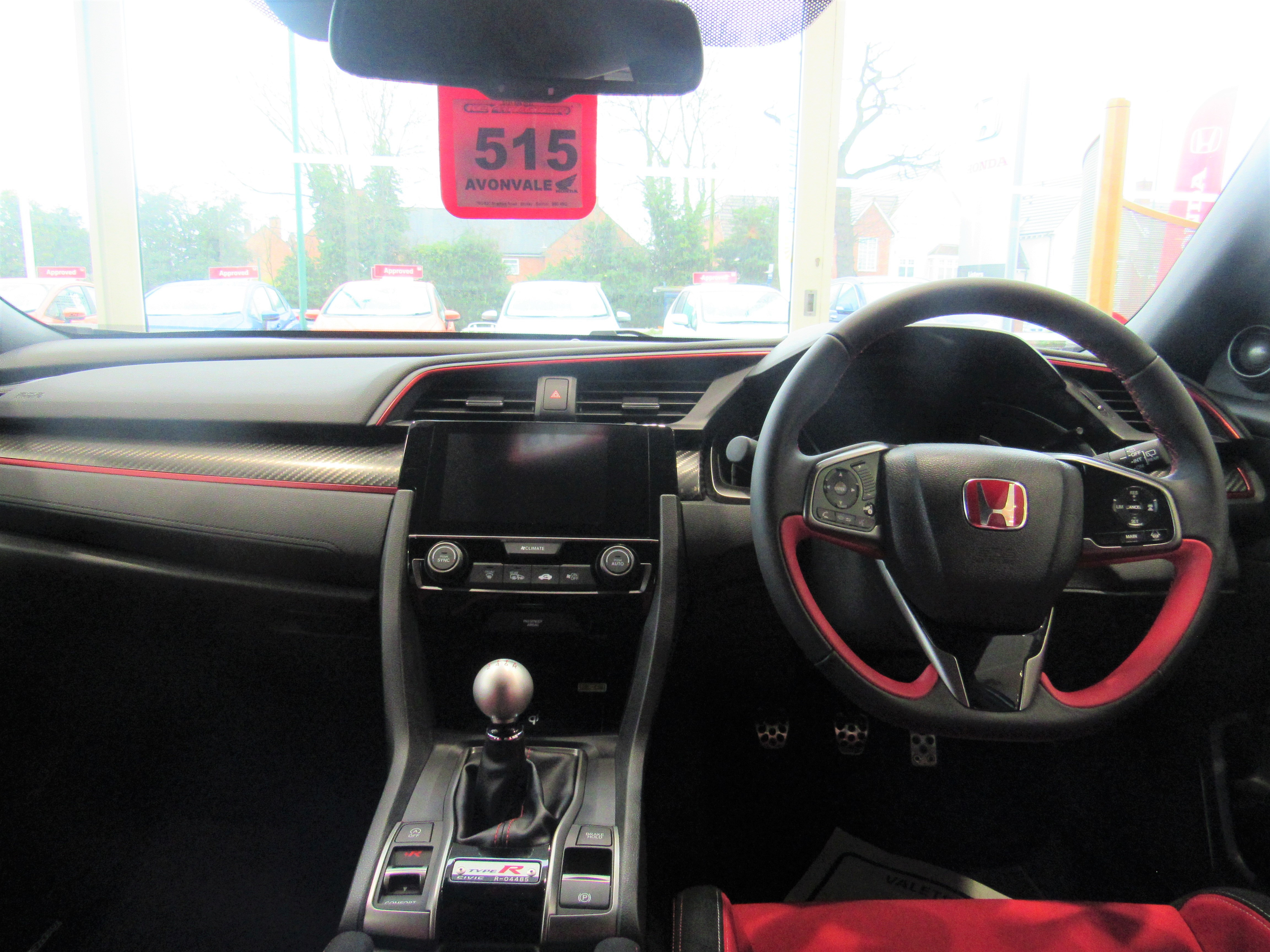
Interior

The interior of the Type R is based on the base model Civic and features a low driving position, with the gear shift lever positioned high to allow for easy gear changes. The interior comes standard in red and black, with sports seats and faux carbon fiber trim. The driver's seat and the steering wheel are adjustable. A reversing camera is standard for easier rear visibility when reversing, and parking sensors are standard on the GT Trim. The interior, although lauded for its comfort and user-friendliness, is criticised for its infotainment system, which has been described as slow and difficult to operate. The fit and finish are considered comparable to those of its competitors. Safety features include automatic emergency braking, traffic sign recognition, lane departure warning, and automatic high-beam assistance, carried over from the base Civic but implemented after 2020 model years. The GT trim adds blind-spot monitoring and cross-traffic alert, parking sensors at the front and rear, dual-zone climate control, power-folding door mirrors, and infotainment upgrades that include wireless phone charging and built-in sat-navigation, along with a more powerful 11-speaker stereo. The Type R earned a Euro NCAP 5-star crash test rating.

=== Records ===
On 3 April 2017, the pre-production Type R achieved a lap time of 7:43.80 on the Nürburgring Nordschleife, almost 7 seconds faster than its predecessor, the FK2 Type R’s 7:50.63, setting a new record for front-wheel-drive cars. The car also set new front-wheel-drive lap records at the Magny-Cours, Spa-Francorchamps, Silverstone, Estoril, Hungaroring and Mount Panorama circuits. The Nürburgring record was broken by the Renault Mégane RS Trophy-R in July 2019, which set a time of 7:40.10, but in 2020 the Limited Edition Civic Type R reclaimed honours by setting a new front-wheel-drive lap record at the Suzuka Circuit, beating the Mégane’s time by 1.5 seconds.

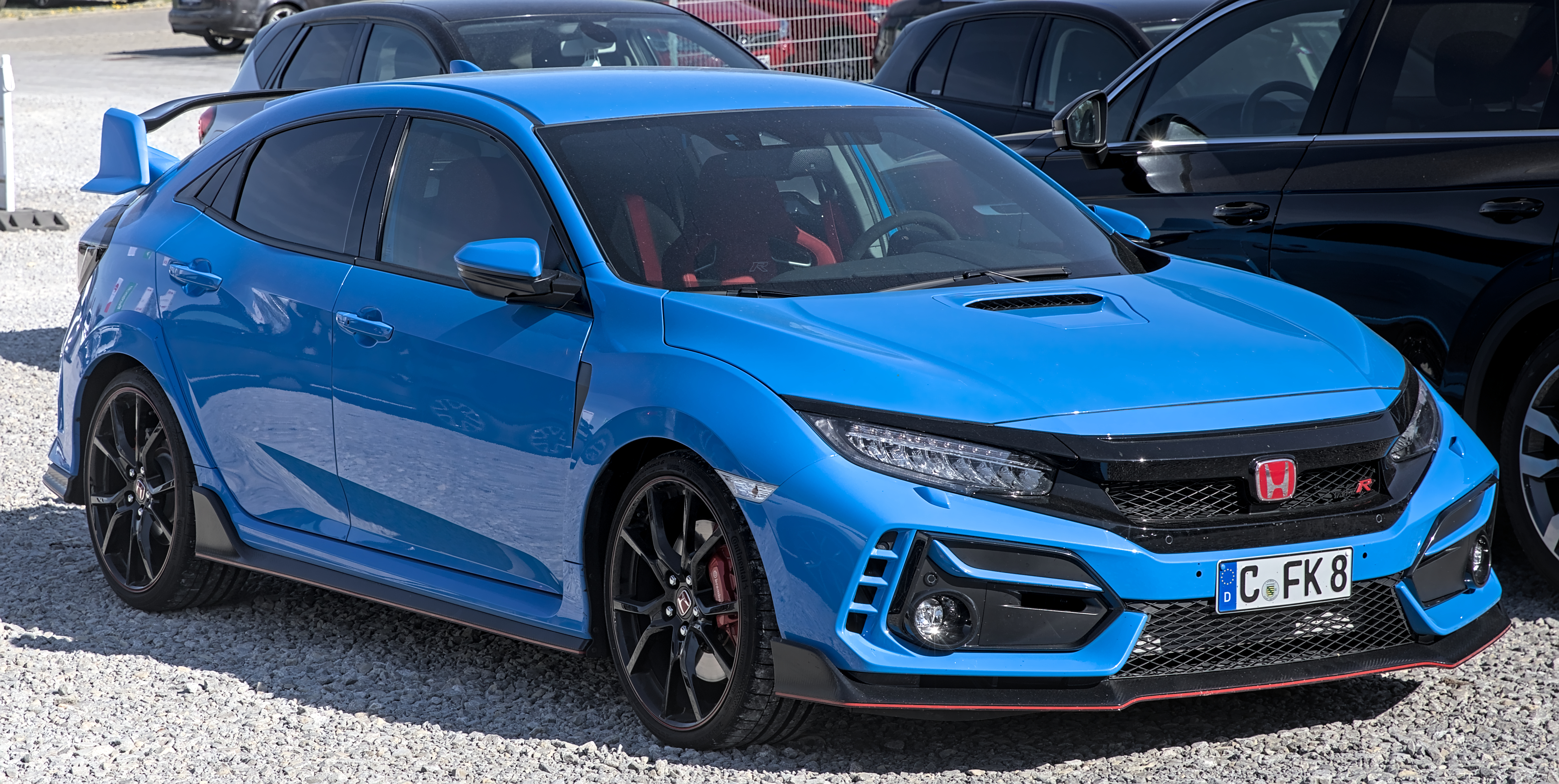

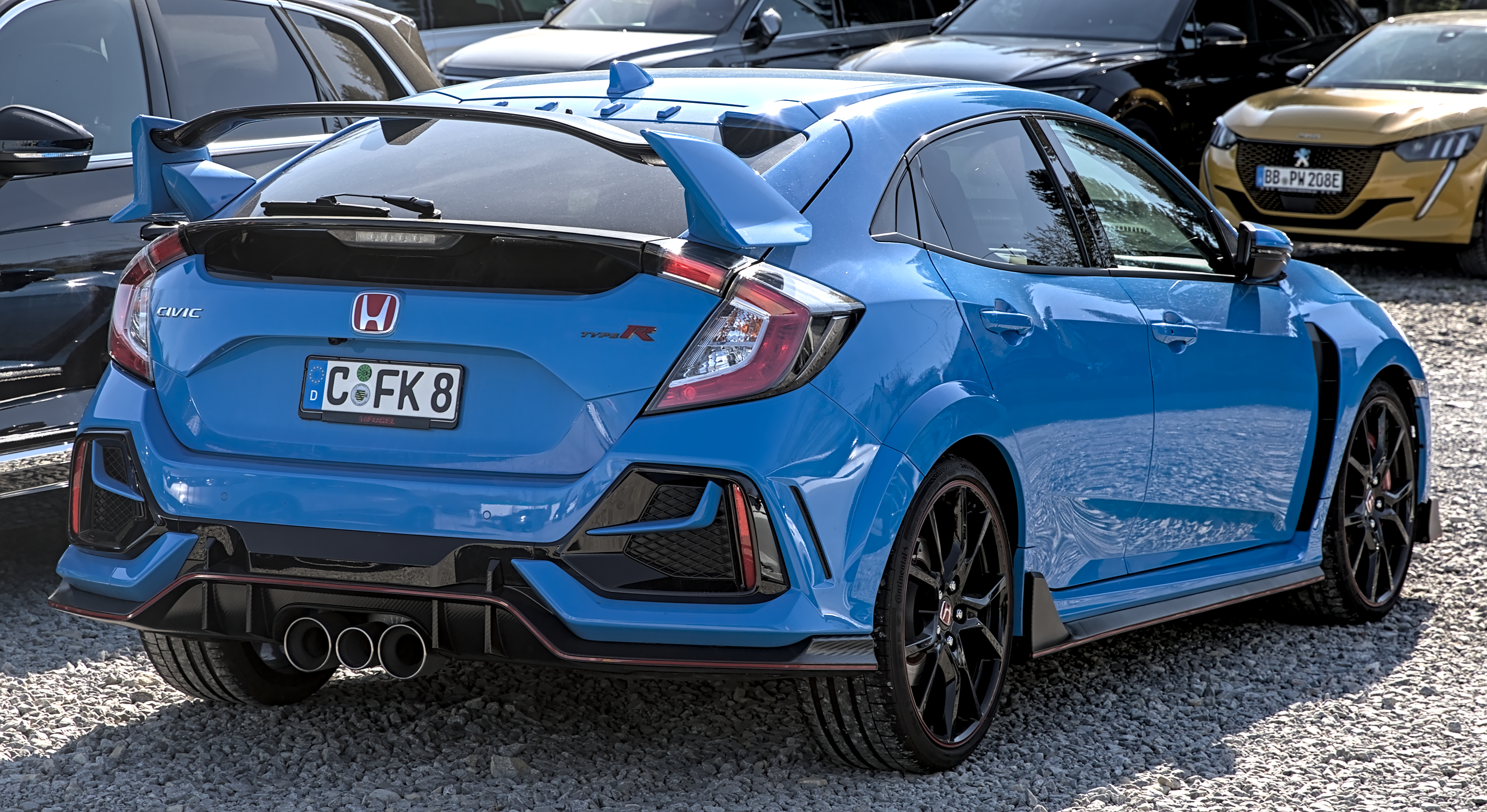
Facelift (2020)

=== Markets ===
==== North America ====
The Civic Type R went on sale in the United States and Canada on 14 June 2017, marking the first time it was officially available in these markets and slotting above the Civic Si sedan/coupe. Being based on the FK8 generation of Civics, which was designed as a global car, this made it easier to export the Type R to North America since that market already had the standard, UK-built Civic hatchback available for sale.

In Canada and the USA, the Civic Type R is only offered with 306 hp (228 kW) turbocharged 2.0-litre i-VTEC four-cylinder engine. The Type R has amenities including a 12-speaker sound system with SiriusXM radio and a 7-inch touchscreen that supports gesture controls but no auxiliary input. Minor changes were made in 2019. Honda added a volume knob and physical buttons. The climate controls now also have a hard button to adjust the fan speed. The Type R receives larger cupholders, a revised switch for the electronic-parking brake, and more streamlined steering-wheel controls. A new color, Sonic Gray Pearl, was also added. 2020 Type R had minor revisions to the brakes and front suspension.

==== Limited Edition Type R ====
In 2021, Honda offered a Limited Edition Type R. Only 600 were designated for the US, and the car was available only in Phoenix Yellow pearl paint. The LE Type R is 38 pounds (17 kg) lighter than the standard Type R and comes equipped with specially tuned dampers, Michelin Sport Cup 2 tires, and lightweight, forged aluminum wheels from BBS (18 lb. total unsprung weight reduction). The exterior features a gloss-black roof, exterior mirrors, and hood scoop. Further weight reduction of approximately 28 pounds (13 kg) pounds was achieved by reducing sound-deadening materials and removing features such as the rear wiper, tonneau cover, and rear heater ducts. It also featured recalibrated steering for maximum control and feedback

==== United Kingdom ====
In the UK, the Civic Type R was available for consumer test drives in August 2017, with official delivery and sale dates coinciding with national vehicle registration plate changes on 1 September.

==== Australia ====
The FK8 Civic Type R went on sale in Australia in September 2017. Only one trim level was available about midway between the EDM Touring and GT specifications. Due to limited access to high-octane fuel, the engine was only offered in the 306 bhp tune.

==== Indonesia ====
The Civic Type R was launched in Indonesia during the 25th Gaikindo Indonesia International Auto Show in August 2017. The facelifted model was released in May 2021.

==== Malaysia and Singapore ====
In Singapore, the Civic Type R was officially launched by Kah Motor on 27 July 2017 in limited numbers.

In Malaysia, the Civic Type R was launched in October 2017 during the Malaysia Autoshow.

==== Philippines ====
In the Philippines, the Civic Type R was presented during the 2017 Manila International Auto Show and officially went on sale in July 2017.

==== Thailand ====
In Thailand, the Civic Type R was launched in 2018 with only 4 units available.

=== Awards ===
The FK8 Civic Type R has won many accolades and awards. It was crowned Top Gear Magazine's Hot Hatch of the Year 2017 and voted International Editors' Choice and overall Car of the Year 2017. What Car? also awarded the Type R its Hot Hatch of the Year award. In Australia, the car was awarded Performance Car of the Year 2018. The car was chosen as one of the Top 10 Tech Cars by the IEEE in 2018.

== FL5 (2023; based on eleventh generation Civic) ==
Sixth generation
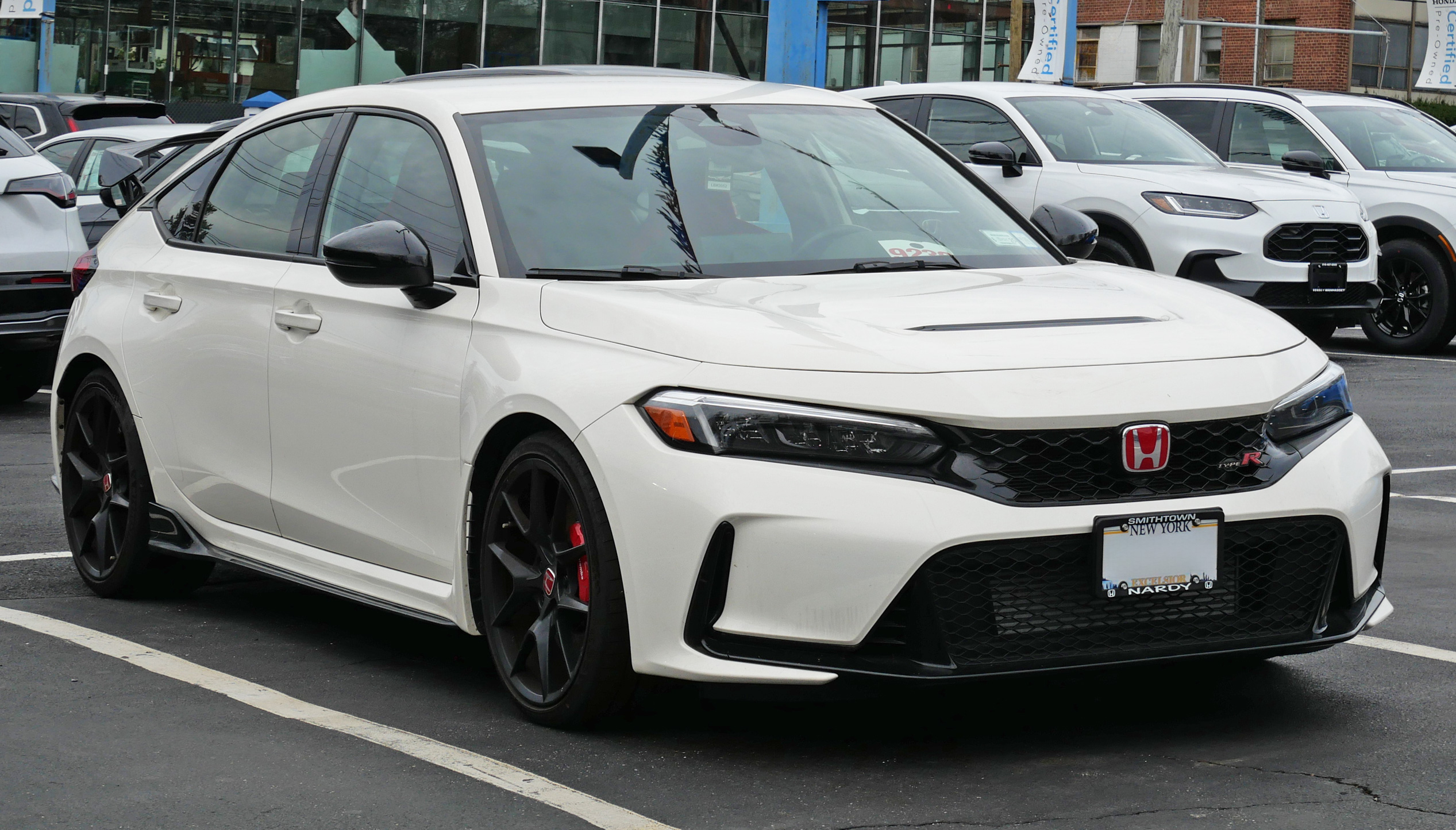
- 2023 Civic Type R (FL5)

Overview
- Model code: FL5
- Production: 2022–present
- Model years: 2023–present
- Assembly: Japan: Yorii, Saitama
- Designer: Dai Hara

Body and chassis
- Body style: 5-door liftback
- Related: Acura Integra Type S (DE5); Honda Prelude (BF1)

Powertrain
- Engine: 2.0 L K20C1 VTEC turbo I4
- Power output: 330 PS (243 kW; 325 hp) (Japan and Europe); 320 PS (235 kW; 316 hp) (North America); 297 PS (218 kW; 293 hp) (Brazil)
- Transmission: 6-speed manual

Dimensions
- Wheelbase: 2,735 mm (107.7 in)
- Length: 4,595 mm (180.9 in)
- Width: 1,890 mm (74.4 in)
- Height: 1,405 mm (55.3 in)
- Curb weight: 1,430 kg (3,153 lb)

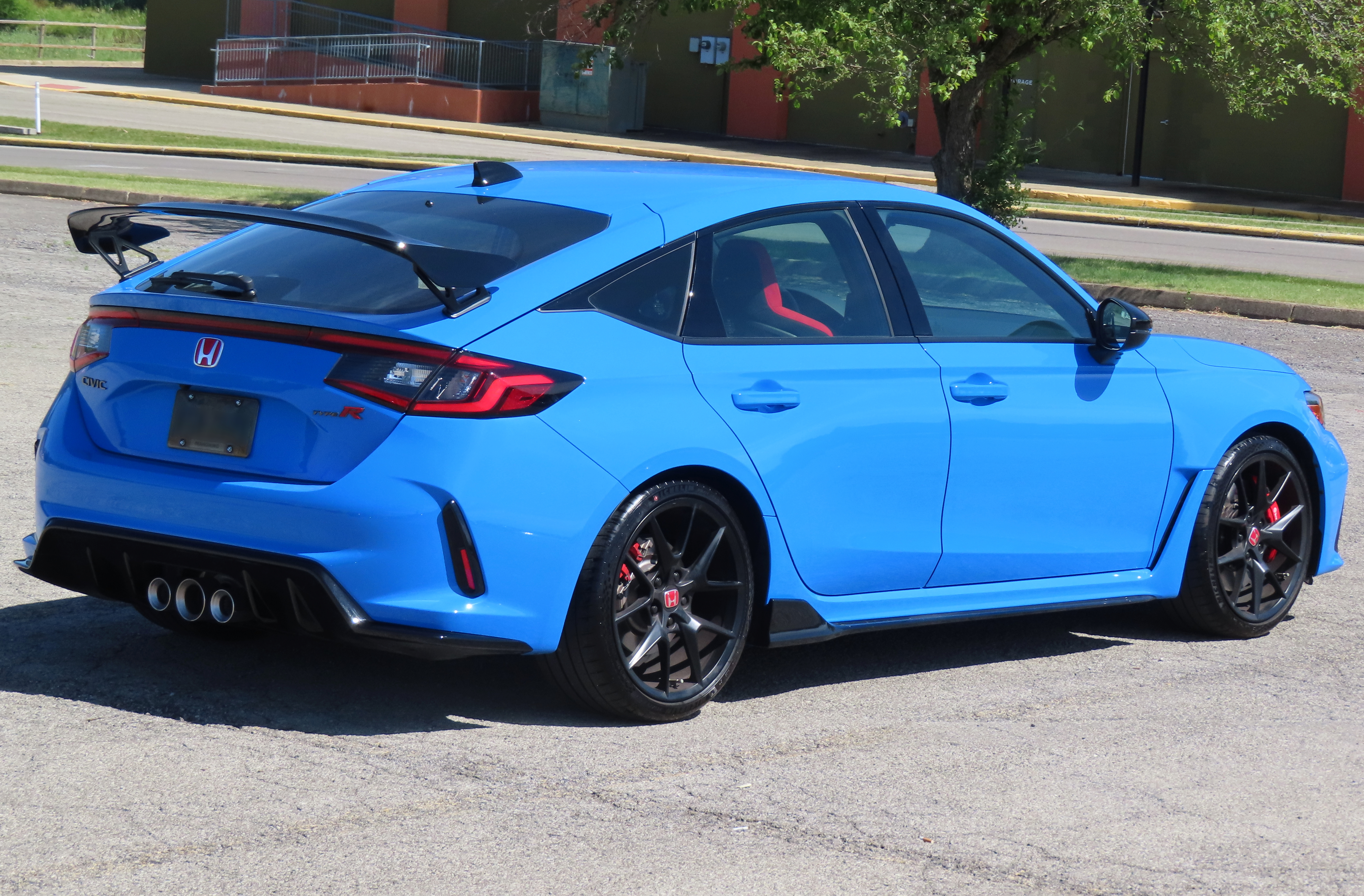
Rear view

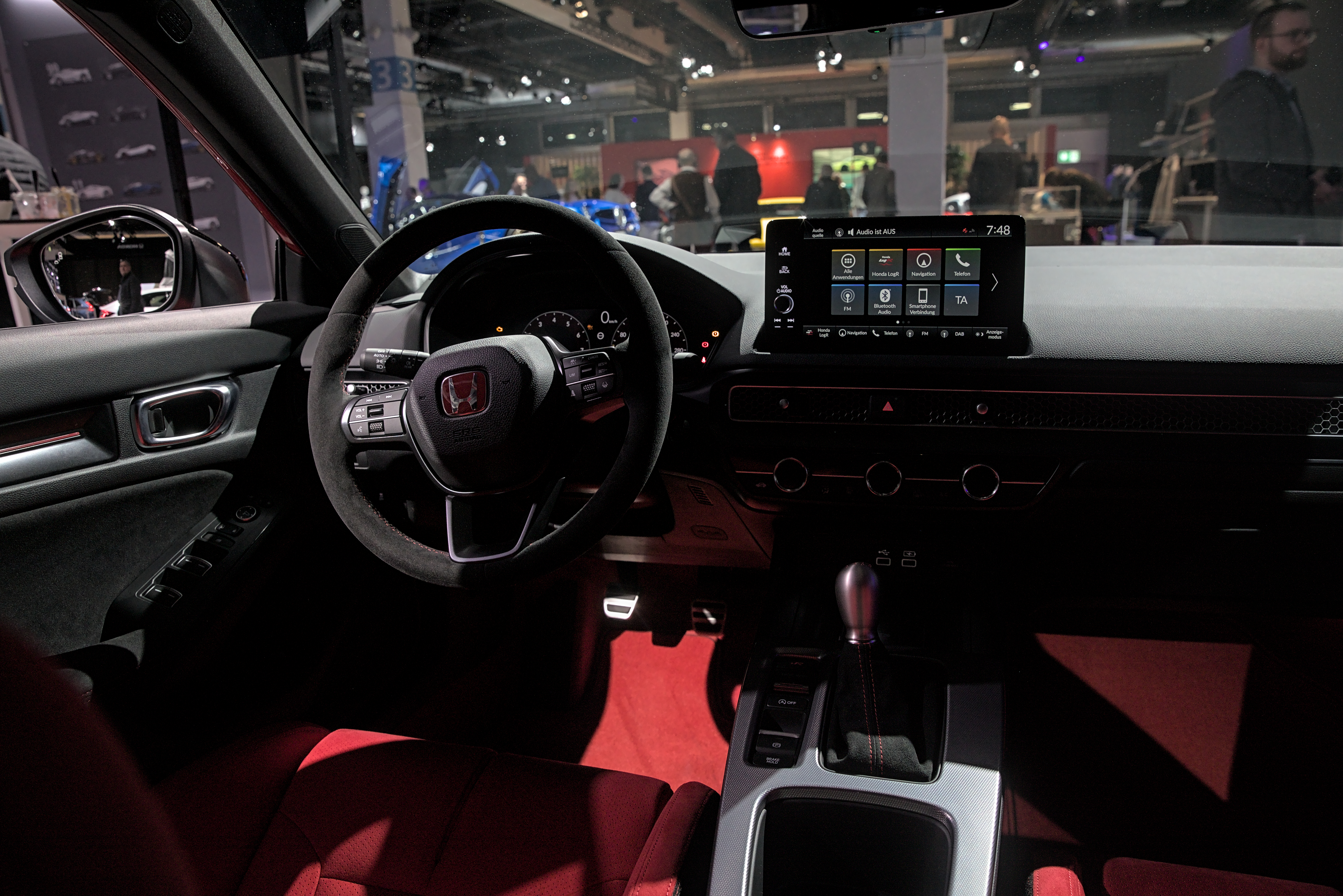
Interior

The sixth-generation Civic Type R was introduced on 20 July 2022 for the 2023 model year. Designated under the model code FL5, it is presently built in Yorii, Saitama, Japan, where the regular Civic liftback for the Japanese market is also produced. The FL5 Civic Type R is considered less aggressive in design than its predecessor, featuring subtler styling with smaller vents and fewer decorative elements. It uses 19-inch wheels (smaller than the FK8’s 20-inch units) but with wider 265/30 Michelin Pilot Sport 4S tires, improving overall grip. Unlike the FK8, which used plastic add-ons to widen its rear arches, the FL5 achieves a wider track with fully reshaped rear doors and quarters. Inside, the FL5 retains signature Type R details such as red carpeting, semi-bucket seats, and a unique digital instrument and infotainment interface that integrates the Honda LogR data logger for tracking lap times and performance metrics. The 2.0-litre turbocharged K20C1 engine carries over from the FK8, with refinements including a more compact, more efficient turbocharger housing and redesigned turbine blades to improve airflow and power delivery.

=== Records ===
In March 2022, a pre-production FL5 Civic Type R set a front-wheel-drive lap record at the Suzuka Circuit with a time of 2:23.120. On 20 April 2023, Honda announced that the FL5—specifically the lightweight Type R S variant—had reclaimed the front-wheel-drive production-car record at the Nürburgring Nordschleife with a lap time of 7 minutes 44.881 seconds, surpassing the 2019 Renault Mégane R.S. Trophy-R’s time of 7:45.399. Although the FL5’s recorded time appears slower than the FK8’s 7:43.80, this is due to updated Nürburgring measurement rules introduced in 2019, which extended the official lap distance from 20.600 km to 20.832 km.

=== 2026 facelift ===
Honda announced a facelifted FL5 on October 1st, 2026 for the 2027 model year. Changes include a redesigned front fascia grille to improve engine cooling, mechanical improvements to the brake, +R, rev match and ride quality, improved and heated bucket seats, dark gray trim pieces, auto-dimming mirror, ultrasuede dashboard and Google built-in infotainment system. The FL5 gained Meteorite Gray Metallic as a color option, but discontinued Crystal Black Pearl and Rallye Red.

=== Markets ===
==== Europe ====
The FL5 Civic Type R went on sale in Europe in late 2022, with deliveries beginning in January 2023. In June 2025, Honda Europe announced the Ultimate Edition, limited to 40 units, marking the end of sales in the European market due to stricter European emission standards. The model, finished in Championship White, features red decals, a black-painted roof, carbon details, illuminated interior trim, and special Type R door-mirror projection lighting.

==== GCC ====
The FL5 Civic Type R was launched in the United Arab Emirates on 1 February 2023, marking the model’s return to the region after 12 years.

==== North America ====
The FL5 went on sale in North America in October 2022.

==== Southeast Asia ====
The FL5 Civic Type R debuted in Vietnam on 26 October 2022, followed by launches in Thailand (December 2022), the Philippines (January 2023), Indonesia (March 2023), and Malaysia (September 2023). On 6 November 2024, Honda Malaysia issued a proactive product update for 2023–2024 models to address a potential issue with the electric power steering gearbox.

== See also ==
- Honda Type R
- Honda Civic Si
