= List of European Touring Car Cup drivers =

This is a list of racing drivers to have raced in the European Touring Car Cup (2005–2017).

== Drivers ==
| Name | Country | Seasons |
|---|---|---|
| Aleksandr Artemyev | Kazakhstan | 2015– |
| Mehdi Bennani | Morocco | 2011 |
| Marcis Birkens | Latvia | 2009–2010 |
| Aytaç Biter | Turkey | 2010, 2012–2015 |
| Wilson Borgnino | Argentina | 2012 |
| Dušan Borković | Serbia | 2013, 2015 |
| Gilles Bruckner | Luxembourg | 2012–2015 |
| Dejan Bulatovič | Montenegro | 2015 |
| Teddy Clairet | France | 2016– |
| Aurélien Comte | France | 2013 |
| Mario Dablander | Austria | 2013 |
| Franz Engstler | Germany | 2005, 2008–2009, 2015 |
| Fabio Fabiani | Italy | 2007–2008, 2012 |
| Christian Fischer | Switzerland | 2011–2013 |
| Petr Fulín | Czech Republic | 2012– |
| Fabrizio Giovanardi | Italy | 2011 |
| Richard Göransson | Sweden | 2005, 2008 |
| Nicolas Hamilton | UK | 2013 |
| Kevin Hilgenhövel | Germany | 2016– |
| Maťo Homola | Slovakia | 2012–2015 |
| Pierre Humbert | France | 2016– |
| Oleksander Ivanchenko | Ukraine | 2013 |
| Davit Kajaia | Georgia | 2015– |
| Nikolay Karamyshev | Russia | 2008–2009, 2012–2014 |
| Richard Kaye | UK | 2007 |
| Ulrike Krafft | Germany | 2012– |
| Kevin Krammes | Germany | 2012–2013 |
| Wolfgang Kriegl | Austria | 2016– |
| Mladen Lalušić | Serbia | 2015– |
| Egons Lapins | Latvia | 2008 |
| Andrii Levtushenko | Ukraine | 2016– |
| Erwin Lukas | Germany | 2012–2015 |
| Henrik Lundgaard | Denmark | 2007 |
| Niklas Mackschin | Germany | 2015– |
| Ralf Martin | Germany | 2008 |
| Fernando Monje | Spain | 2012 |
| Jens Reno Møller | Denmark | 2008 |
| Fábio Mota | Portugal | 2016– |
| René Münnich | Germany | 2016– |
| Norbert Nagy | Hungary | 2013–2014, 2016– |
| Paolo Necchi | Italy | 2012 |
| Kseniya Niks | Ukraine | 2013–2014, 2016 |
| Jordi Oriola | Spain | 2013 |
| Emmet O'Brien | Ireland | 2006–2007 |
| Stian Paulsen | Norway | 2012 |
| Aku Pellinen | Finland | 2014 |
| Jason Plato | UK | 2005–2006 |
| Leonid Protasov | Ukraine | 2010 |
| Yuriy Protasov | Ukraine | 2010 |
| Irina Protasova | Ukraine | 2010 |
| Ronny Reinsberger | Germany | 2012 |
| Kris Richard | Switzerland | 2016– |
| Peter Rikli | Switzerland | 2008, 2010– |
| Andreas Rinke | Germany | 2016– |
| Jörg Schori | Switzerland | 2010 |
| Christ-Johannes Schreiber | Switzerland | 2016– |
| Carsten Seifert | Germany | 2008–2010 |
| Ryan Sharp | UK | 2006 |
| Igor Skuz | Ukraine | 2011–2014 |
| Igor Stefanovski | Macedonia | 2016– |
| James Thompson | UK | 2009–2010 |
| Gábor Tim | Hungary | 2012 |
| Aleksandar Tošić | Serbia | 2011–2012 |
| Ümit Ülkü | Turkey | 2015 |
| Stefano Valli | San Marino | 2006–2007 |
| Harry Vaulkhard | UK | 2009 |
| Anton Zaitsev | Ukraine | 2013 |
