= 2011 European Touring Car Cup =

Motorsport contest

Seasons
- ← 2010 2012 →

Layout of the Salzburgring

The 2011 FIA European Touring Car Cup was the seventh running of the FIA European Touring Car Cup. It was contested over a single event at the Salzburgring on the weekend of 23–24 July, unlike in 2010 where it was a three-event series. The event consisted of two races run over a distance of approximately 50 kilometres each. Three FIA cups were awarded at the conclusion of the event, one per each of the eligible categories: Super 2000, Super 1600 and Super Production.

== Teams and drivers ==
Super 2000 class
Team	Car	No.	Drivers
Chevrolet Motorsport Sweden	Chevrolet Cruze LT	2	(Denmark) Michel Nykjær
(Denmark) Hartmann Honda Racing	Honda Accord Euro R	4	(Italy) Fabrizio Giovanardi
(Denmark) Hartmann Honda Racing	Honda Accord Euro R	5	(Austria) Wolfgang Treml
(Spain) SUNRED Engineering	SEAT León 2.0 TDI	6	(Spain) Pepe Oriola
(Switzerland) Rikli Motorsport	Honda Civic FD	8	(Switzerland) Peter Rikli
(Switzerland) Rikli Motorsport	Honda Accord Euro R	9	(Switzerland) Christian Fischer
(Italy) Proteam Racing	BMW 320si	11	(Morocco) Mehdi Bennani
(Turkey) Borusan Otomotiv Motorsport	BMW 320si	13	(Turkey) Ibrahim Okyay
(Germany) Thate Motorsport	BMW 320si	14	(Germany) Jens-Guido Weimann
(Germany) K&K Motorsport Scuderia AVUS	Audi A4	15	(Germany) Andreas Kast
(Sweden) Seco Tools Racing Team	Honda Accord Euro R	17	(Sweden) Tomas Engström
Super Production class
(Italy) F Motorsport	BMW 320i E46	22	(Italy) Fabio Fabiani
(Serbia) ASK Vitro Racing	Honda Civic Type-R	23	(Serbia) Aleksandar Tosić
(Netherlands) Pro East Racing	Mitsubishi Carisma 1.8 GDI	24	(Netherlands) Niek Oude Luttikhuis
Super 1600 class
(Germany) ATM Speed Ladies Team	Ford Fiesta 1.6 16V	32	(Germany) Ulrike Krafft
(Germany) ATM Racing	Ford Fiesta ST	33	(Germany) Klaus Bingler
(Germany) ATM Racing	Ford Fiesta 1.6 16V	34	(Ukraine) Igor Skuz
(Germany) GENA Autosport	Ford Fiesta ST	35	(Germany) Erwin Lukas
(Germany) Roscher Racing	Ford Fiesta ST (LPG)	37	(Germany) Thomas Mühlenz

== Final standings ==
Pos	Driver	Race 1	Race 2	Pts
Super 2000
1	(Italy) Fabrizio Giovanardi	**1**	2	21
2	(Spain) Pepe Oriola	2	1	20
3	(Sweden) Tomas Engström	3	3	13
4	(Austria) Wolfgang Treml	6	4	8
5	(Morocco) Mehdi Bennani	4	15	6
6	(Switzerland) Peter Rikli	8	**5**	5
7	(Turkey) Ibrahim Okyay	5	Ret	4
8	(Germany) Andreas Kast	9	6	3
9	(Germany) Jens-Guido Weimann	7	Ret	2
9	(Switzerland) Christian Fischer	Ret	7	2
	(Denmark) Michel Nykjær	Ret	Ret	0
Super Production
1	(Serbia) Aleksandar Tošić	**11**	**8**	23
2	(Italy) Fabio Fabiani	15	14	16
Super 1600
1	(Germany) Thomas Mühlenz	**10**	**9**	23
2	(Germany) Ulrike Krafft	12	10	18
3	(Germany) Erwin Lukas	13	12	11
4	(Germany) Klaus Bingler	14	13	9
5	(Ukraine) Igor Skuz	Ret	11	7
Pos	Driver	Race 1	Race 2	Pts

Colour	Result
Gold	Winner
Silver	Second place
Bronze	Third place
Green	Points classification
Blue	Non-points classification
Blue	Non-classified finish (NC)
Purple	Retired, not classified (Ret)
Red	Did not qualify (DNQ)
Red	Did not pre-qualify (DNPQ)
Black	Disqualified (DSQ)
White	Did not start (DNS)
White	Withdrew (WD)
White	Race cancelled (C)
Blank	Did not practice (DNP)
Blank	Did not arrive (DNA)
Blank	Excluded (EX)

**Bold** – Pole
Italics – Fastest Lap
