= 2000 European Super Touring Cup =

Seasons
- ← 1988 2001 →

The 2000 European Super Touring Cup was the 27th season of European touring car racing and the first since 1988. The championship started at Mugello on 2 April and ended after ten events at Cerklje ob Krki on 8 October.

The championship was won by Fabrizio Giovanardi driving for Nordauto Engineering in an Alfa Romeo 156 after a fight against Peter Kox in his Honda Accord and Gianni Morbidelli in his BMW 320i. All of them together with Roberto Colciago achieved 5 victories each one.

Giovanardi was the only one driver able to score points in all 20 races. Peter Kox, the main title contender, had indeed two DNF and moreover he had to drive almost the all season without a team mate who could help him to take off points to Giovanardi. Morbidelli after one year of absence, was able to win all races where the old BMW were competitive but he was not able to get excellent results also in those tracks were Honda and Alfa Romeo were stronger. Although Colciago achieved 5 victories he lost many points due to an unlikely low reliability of his Audi A4.

Due to TV needs the race format had 2 races of just 50km both (about 20 minutes per race) on sunday with a low break of few minutes between the two races.

== Teams and drivers ==
Guest drivers in italics.

Team	Car	No.	Drivers	Rounds
(Italy) Nordauto Engineering	Alfa Romeo 156	1	(Italy) Fabrizio Giovanardi	All
(Italy) Nordauto Engineering	Alfa Romeo 156	2	(Italy) Nicola Larini	All
(Italy) Nordauto Engineering	Alfa Romeo 156	7	(Italy) Romana Bernardoni	All
(Italy) Nordauto Engineering	Alfa Romeo 156	8	(Italy) Gianluca de Lorenzi	All
(Italy) CiBiEmme Engineering	BMW 320i	3	(Italy) Emanuele Naspetti	All
(Italy) CiBiEmme Engineering	BMW 320i	4	(Italy) Gianni Morbidelli	All
(Italy) AGS Motorsport	Audi A4 Quattro	5	(Italy) Roberto Colciago	All
(Italy) AGS Motorsport	Audi A4 Quattro	6	(Italy) Stefano Bonello	1–5, 7
(Italy) AGS Motorsport	Audi A4 Quattro	25	(Italy) Fabrizio de Simone	9–10
(Italy) Christy's Team	BMW 320i	9	(Italy) Max Pigoli	All
(Italy) Christy's Team	BMW 320i	10	(Italy) Stefano Gabellini	All
(Italy) JAS Engineering	Honda Accord	11	(Netherlands) Peter Kox	All
(Italy) JAS Engineering	Honda Accord	24	(Italy) Gabriele Tarquini	9–10
(Italy) JAS Engineering	Honda Accord	27	(United Kingdom) David Leslie	10
(Germany) Team Isert	BMW 320i	12	(Italy) Sandro Sardelli	1–7
(Germany) Team Isert	BMW 320i	26	(Venezuela) Johnny Cecotto	9
(Italy) Soli Racing Team	Alfa Romeo 156	14	(Italy) Moreno Soli	All
(Italy) Nath Racing	Audi A4 Quattro	15	(Italy) Guido Lucchetti Cigarini	1–4, 6–7, 9
National Team Slovakia	Audi A4 Quattro	16	(Slovakia) Andrej Studenič	1, 3, 5, 8
(Poland) Alda Motorsport	Audi A4 Quattro	18	(Poland) Andrzej Dziurka	1–6
(Poland) Alda Motorsport	Alfa Romeo 155 TS	21	(Poland) Maciej Stanco	5
(Germany) Oliver Mayer Motorsport	Audi A4 Quattro	19	(Germany) Oliver Mayer	3
(Italy) Greyhound Motorsport	Opel Vectra	20	(Italy) Gianluca Roda	3–4, 6–10
(Germany) Raceline Racing Team	Opel Vectra	23	(Germany) Heinrich Symanzick	8, 10
(Slovenia) Plamtex Sport Olimpija	BMW 318is	28	(Slovenia) Mišel Zupančič	10
(Federal Republic of Yugoslavia) AL Lamko Novial	BMW 318is	45	(Federal Republic of Yugoslavia) Tanasije Kuvalja	10

== Results and standings ==
=== Races ===
Round		Circuit	Date	Pole position	Fastest lap	Winning driver	Winning team
1	R1	(Italy) Mugello	2 April	(Netherlands) Peter Kox	(Italy) Gianni Morbidelli	(Netherlands) Peter Kox	JAS Engineering
1	R2	(Italy) Mugello	2 April		(Netherlands) Peter Kox	(Netherlands) Peter Kox	JAS Engineering
2	R3	(Italy) Pergusa	30 April	(Italy) Fabrizio Giovanardi	(Italy) Fabrizio Giovanardi	(Italy) Fabrizio Giovanardi	Nordauto Engineering
2	R4	(Italy) Pergusa	30 April		(Italy) Fabrizio Giovanardi	(Italy) Fabrizio Giovanardi	Nordauto Engineering
3	R5	(Austria) A1-Ring	14 May	(Netherlands) Peter Kox	(Netherlands) Peter Kox	(Netherlands) Peter Kox	JAS Engineering
3	R6	(Austria) A1-Ring	14 May		(Italy) Nicola Larini	(Italy) Fabrizio Giovanardi	Nordauto Engineering
4	R7	(Italy) Monza	11 June	(Netherlands) Peter Kox	(Netherlands) Peter Kox	(Italy) Roberto Colciago	AGS Motorsport
4	R8	(Italy) Monza	11 June		(Netherlands) Peter Kox	(Netherlands) Peter Kox	JAS Engineering
5	R9	(Hungary) Hungaroring	2 July	(Italy) Fabrizio Giovanardi	(Italy) Gianni Morbidelli	(Italy) Gianni Morbidelli	CiBiEmme Engineering
5	R10	(Hungary) Hungaroring	2 July		(Italy) Emanuele Naspetti	(Italy) Gianni Morbidelli	CiBiEmme Engineering
6	R11	(Italy) Imola	9 July	(Netherlands) Peter Kox	(Italy) Roberto Colciago	(Italy) Roberto Colciago	AGS Motorsport
6	R12	(Italy) Imola	9 July		(Netherlands) Peter Kox	(Italy) Roberto Colciago	AGS Motorsport
7	R13	(Italy) Misano	23 July	(Netherlands) Peter Kox	(Italy) Emanuele Naspetti	(Italy) Gianni Morbidelli	CiBiEmme Engineering
7	R14	(Italy) Misano	23 July		(Italy) Emanuele Naspetti	(Italy) Gianni Morbidelli	CiBiEmme Engineering
8	R15	(Czech Republic) Brno Circuit	17 September	(Netherlands) Peter Kox	(Netherlands) Peter Kox	(Netherlands) Peter Kox	JAS Engineering
8	R16	(Czech Republic) Brno Circuit	17 September		(Italy) Emanuele Naspetti	(Italy) Roberto Colciago	AGS Motorsport
9	R17	(Italy) Vallelunga	24 September	(Netherlands) Peter Kox	(Italy) Emanuele Naspetti	(Italy) Fabrizio Giovanardi	Nordauto Engineering
9	R18	(Italy) Vallelunga	24 September		(Italy) Nicola Larini	(Italy) Fabrizio Giovanardi	Nordauto Engineering
10	R19	(Slovenia) Mobikrog	8 October	(Italy) Roberto Colciago	(Italy) Roberto Colciago	(Italy) Roberto Colciago	AGS Motorsport
10	R20	(Slovenia) Mobikrog	8 October		(Netherlands) Peter Kox	(Italy) Gianni Morbidelli	CiBiEmme Engineering

== Round 1 (Italy) Mugello ==
Qualifying

Pos	No	Driver	Car	Lap Time
1	11	(Netherlands) Peter Kox	Honda Accord	1.54.842
2	1	(Italy) Fabrizio Giovanardi	Alfa Romeo 156	1.55.157
3	2	(Italy) Nicola Larini	Alfa Romeo 156	1.55.394
4	8	(Italy) Gianluca De Lorenzi	Alfa Romeo 156	1.55.804
5	3	(Italy) Emanuele Naspetti	BMW 320i	1.56.533
6	4	(Italy) Gianni Morbidelli	BMW 320i	1.56.949
7	5	(Italy) Roberto Colciago	Audi A4 Quattro	1.57.451
8	10	(Italy) Stefano Gabellini	BMW 320i	1.58.189
9	16	(Slovakia) Andrej Studenič	Audi A4 Quattro	1.58.314
10	12	(Italy) Sandro Sardelli	BMW 320i	1.58.388
11	9	(Italy) Massimo Pigoli	BMW 320i	1.58.497
12	7	(Italy) Romana Bernardoni	Alfa Romeo 156	1.59.832
13	15	(Italy) Guido Lucchetti Cigarini	Audi A4 Quattro	2.00.577
14	18	(Poland) Andrzej Dziurka	Audi A4 Quattro	2.02.013
15	6	(Italy) Stefano Bonello	Audi A4 Quattro	2.03.183
16	14	(Italy) Moreno Soli	Alfa Romeo 156	2.03.994

Race 1

Pos	No	Driver	Constructor	Time/Retired	Points
1	11	(Netherlands) Peter Kox	Honda Accord	9 laps in 17:41.299	20
2	2	(Italy) Nicola Larini	Alfa Romeo 156	+0.753s	15
3	4	(Italy) Gianni Morbidelli	BMW 320i	+9.027s	12
4	1	(Italy) Fabrizio Giovanardi	Alfa Romeo 156	+17.971s	10
5	16	(Slovakia) Andrej Studenič	Audi A4 Quattro	+30.462s	8
6	9	(Italy) Massimo Pigoli	BMW 320i	+34.823s	6
7	12	(Italy) Sandro Sardelli	BMW 320i	+36.114s	4
8	15	(Italy) Guido Lucchetti Cigarini	Audi A4 Quattro	+42.708s	3
9	18	(Poland) Andrzej Dziurka	Audi A4 Quattro	+44.994s	2
10	6	(Italy) Stefano Bonello	Audi A4 Quattro	+57.964s	1
11	14	(Italy) Moreno Soli	Alfa Romeo 156	+58.941s	
12 DNF	7	(Italy) Romana Bernardoni	Alfa Romeo 156	+3 laps	
DNF	5	(Italy) Roberto Colciago	Audi A4 Quattro	+6 laps	
DNF	8	(Italy) Gianluca De Lorenzi	Alfa Romeo 156	+6 laps	
DNF	10	(Italy) Stefano Gabellini	BMW 320i	+8 laps	
DNF	3	(Italy) Emanuele Naspetti	BMW 320i	+9 laps	

Race 2

Pos	No	Driver	Constructor	Time/Retired	Points
1	11	(Netherlands) Peter Kox	Honda Accord	9 laps in 17:41.879	20
2	2	(Italy) Nicola Larini	Alfa Romeo 156	+0.674s	15
3	1	(Italy) Fabrizio Giovanardi	Alfa Romeo 156	+1.794s	12
4	4	(Italy) Gianni Morbidelli	BMW 320i	+5.574s	10
5	8	(Italy) Gianluca De Lorenzi	Alfa Romeo 156	+9.961s	8
6	3	(Italy) Emanuele Naspetti	BMW 320i	+13.277s	6
7	5	(Italy) Roberto Colciago	Audi A4 Quattro	+17.377s	4
8	9	(Italy) Massimo Pigoli	BMW 320i	+26.313s	3
9	10	(Italy) Stefano Gabellini	BMW 320i	+27.096s	2
10	16	(Slovakia) Andrej Studenič	Audi A4 Quattro	+28.218s	1
11	12	(Italy) Sandro Sardelli	BMW 320i	+30.302s	
12	6	(Italy) Stefano Bonello	Audi A4 Quattro	+44.480s	
13	18	(Poland) Andrzej Dziurka	Audi A4 Quattro	+45.019s	
14	14	(Italy) Moreno Soli	Alfa Romeo 156	+54.226s	
15	7	(Italy) Romana Bernardoni	Alfa Romeo 156	+1.02.363s	
DNF	15	(Italy) Guido Lucchetti Cigarini	Audi A4 Quattro	+6 laps	

=== Championship standings after Round 1 ===
Drivers' Championship standings

Pos	Driver	Points
1	(Netherlands) Peter Kox	40
2	(Italy) Nicola Larini	30
3	(Italy) Fabrizio Giovanardi	22
3	(Italy) Gianni Morbidelli	22
5	(Italy) Massimo Pigoli	9

Teams' Championship standings

Pos	Constructor	Points
1	(Italy) Nordauto Engineering	52
2	(Italy) JAS Engineering	40
3	(Italy) CiBiEmme Engineering	28
4	(Italy) Christy's Team	11
5	National Team Slovakia	9

== Round 2 (Italy) Pergusa ==
Qualifying

Pos	No	Driver	Car	Lap Time
1	1	(Italy) Fabrizio Giovanardi	Alfa Romeo 156	1.42.817
2	11	(Netherlands) Peter Kox	Honda Accord	1.43.475
3	3	(Italy) Emanuele Naspetti	BMW 320i	1.43.560
4	2	(Italy) Nicola Larini	Alfa Romeo 156	1.43.991
5	8	(Italy) Gianluca De Lorenzi	Alfa Romeo 156	1.44.778
6	12	(Italy) Sandro Sardelli	BMW 320i	1.45.333
7	5	(Italy) Roberto Colciago	Audi A4 Quattro	1.45.718
8	9	(Italy) Massimo Pigoli	BMW 320i	1.46.041
9	4	(Italy) Gianni Morbidelli	BMW 320i	1.46.308
10	7	(Italy) Romana Bernardoni	Alfa Romeo 156	1.48.072
11	14	(Italy) Moreno Soli	Alfa Romeo 156	1.48.866
12	18	(Poland) Andrzej Dziurka	Audi A4 Quattro	1.50.337
13	6	(Italy) Stefano Bonello	Audi A4 Quattro	1.50.851
14	15	(Italy) Guido Lucchetti Cigarini	Audi A4 Quattro	1.51.972
15	10	(Italy) Stefano Gabellini	BMW 320i	no time

Race 1

Pos	No	Driver	Constructor	Time/Retired	Points
1	1	(Italy) Fabrizio Giovanardi	Alfa Romeo 156	10 laps in 17:31.492	20
2	11	(Netherlands) Peter Kox	Honda Accord	+3.867s	15
3	2	(Italy) Nicola Larini	Alfa Romeo 156	+5.764s	12
4	3	(Italy) Emanuele Naspetti	BMW 320i	+5.967s	10
5	8	(Italy) Gianluca De Lorenzi	Alfa Romeo 156	+15.484s	8
6	5	(Italy) Roberto Colciago	Audi A4 Quattro	+17.907s	6
7	4	(Italy) Gianni Morbidelli	BMW 320i	+25.606s	4
8	10	(Italy) Stefano Gabellini	BMW 320i	+41.638s	3
9	7	(Italy) Romana Bernardoni	Alfa Romeo 156	+54.920s	2
10	18	(Poland) Andrzej Dziurka	Audi A4 Quattro	+58.506s	1
11	14	(Italy) Moreno Soli	Alfa Romeo 155	+58.782s	
12	15	(Italy) Guido Lucchetti Cigarini	Audi A4 Quattro	+1.29.604s	
13	6	(Italy) Stefano Bonello	Audi A4 Quattro	+1.32.151s	
DNF	9	(Italy) Massimo Pigoli	BMW 320i	+4 laps	
DNF	12	(Italy) Sandro Sardelli	BMW 320i	+5 laps	

Race 2

Pos	No	Driver	Constructor	Time/Retired	Points
1	1	(Italy) Fabrizio Giovanardi	Alfa Romeo 156	10 laps in 17.31.793	20
2	3	(Italy) Emanuele Naspetti	BMW 320i	+4.737s	15
3	8	(Italy) Gianluca De Lorenzi	Alfa Romeo 156	+7.933s	12
4	5	(Italy) Roberto Colciago	Audi A4 Quattro	+9.381s	10
5	10	(Italy) Stefano Gabellini	BMW 320i	+26.433s	8
6	2	(Italy) Nicola Larini	Alfa Romeo 156	+30.544s	6
7	9	(Italy) Massimo Pigoli	BMW 320i	+33.464s	4
8	7	(Italy) Romana Bernardoni	Alfa Romeo 156	+41.979s	3
9	18	(Poland) Andrzej Dziurka	Audi A4 Quattro	+47.605s	2
10	14	(Italy) Moreno Soli	Alfa Romeo 156	+49.418s	1
11	6	(Italy) Stefano Bonello	Audi A4 Quattro	+53.520s	
12	15	(Italy) Guido Lucchetti Cigarini	Audi A4 Quattro	+1.00.485	
13	11	(Netherlands) Peter Kox	Honda Accord	+1.01.331s	
DNF	4	(Italy) Gianni Morbidelli	BMW 320i	+8 laps	
DNS	12	(Italy) Sandro Sardelli	BMW 320i		

=== Championship standings after Round 2 ===
Drivers' Championship standings

Pos	Driver	Points
1	(Italy) Fabrizio Giovanardi	62
2	(Netherlands) Peter Kox	55
3	(Italy) Nicola Larini	48
4	(Italy) Emanuele Naspetti	31
5	(Italy) Gianluca De Lorenzi	28

Teams' Championship standings

Pos	Constructor	Points
1	(Italy) Nordauto Engineering	116
2	(Italy) CiBiEmme Engineering	57
3	(Italy) JAS Engineering	55
4	(Italy) Christy's Team	26
5	(Italy) AGS Motorsport	21

== Round 3 (Austria) A1-Ring ==
Qualifying

Pos	No	Driver	Car	Lap Time
1	11	(Netherlands) Peter Kox	Honda Accord	1.36.110
2	1	(Italy) Fabrizio Giovanardi	Alfa Romeo 156	1.36.749
3	2	(Italy) Nicola Larini	Alfa Romeo 156	1.36.769
4	5	(Italy) Roberto Colciago	Audi A4 Quattro	1.37.389
5	4	(Italy) Gianni Morbidelli	BMW 320i	1.37.644
6	8	(Italy) Gianluca De Lorenzi	Alfa Romeo 156	1.37.734
7	3	(Italy) Emanuele Naspetti	BMW 320i	1.38.011
8	12	(Italy) Sandro Sardelli	BMW 320i	1.38.219
9	9	(Italy) Massimo Pigoli	BMW 320i	1.38.610
10	16	(Slovakia) Andrej Studenič	Audi A4 Quattro	1.39.019
11	10	(Italy) Stefano Gabellini	BMW 320i	1.39.089
12	7	(Italy) Romana Bernardoni	Alfa Romeo 156	1.39.341
13	14	(Italy) Moreno Soli	Alfa Romeo 156	1.40.004
14	18	(Poland) Andrzej Dziurka	Audi A4 Quattro	1.40.013
15	6	(Italy) Stefano Bonello	Audi A4 Quattro	1.40.575
16	20	(Italy) Gianluca Roda	Opel Vectra	1.40.667
17	19	(Germany) Oliver Mayer Motorsport	Audi A4 quattro	1.42.144
18	15	(Italy) Guido Lucchetti Cigarini	Audi A4 Quattro	no time

Race 1

Pos	No	Driver	Constructor	Time/Retired	Points
1	11	(Netherlands) Peter Kox	Honda Accord	12 laps in 19:45.634	20
2	1	(Italy) Fabrizio Giovanardi	Alfa Romeo 156	+6.871s	15
3	4	(Italy) Gianni Morbidelli	BMW 320i	+7.521s	12
4	2	(Italy) Nicola Larini	Alfa Romeo 156	+7.801s	10
5	8	(Italy) Gianluca De Lorenzi	Alfa Romeo 156	+8.750s	8
6	3	(Italy) Emanuele Naspetti	BMW 320i	+11.676s	6
7	12	(Italy) Sandro Sardelli	BMW 320i	+16.990s	4
8	9	(Italy) Massimo Pigoli	BMW 320i	+20.266s	3
9	10	(Italy) Stefano Gabellini	BMW 320i	+21.638s	2
10	16	(Slovakia) Andrej Studenič	Audi A4 Quattro	+25.421s	1
11	7	(Italy) Romana Bernardoni	Alfa Romeo 156	+43.566s	
12	18	(Poland) Andrzej Dziurka	Audi A4 Quattro	+47.369s	
13	19	(Germany) Oliver Mayer	Audi A4 Quattro	+51.352s	
14	6	(Italy) Stefano Bonello	Audi A4 Quattro	+1.06.906s	
15	14	(Italy) Moreno Soli	Alfa Romeo 155	+1.11.551s	
DNF	5	(Italy) Roberto Colciago	Audi A4 Quattro	+5 laps	
DNF	15	(Italy) Guido Lucchetti Cigarini	Audi A4 Quattro	+6 laps	
DNS	20	(Italy) Gianluca Roda	Opel Vectra		

Race 2

Pos	No	Driver	Constructor	Time/Retired	Points
1	1	(Italy) Fabrizio Giovanardi	Alfa Romeo 156	12 laps in 21.19.125	20
2	4	(Italy) Gianni Morbidelli	BMW 320i	+0.381s	15
3	2	(Italy) Nicola Larini	Alfa Romeo 156	+0.600s	12
4	8	(Italy) Gianluca De Lorenzi	Alfa Romeo 156	+1.095s	10
5	3	(Italy) Emanuele Naspetti	BMW 320i	+2.846	8
6	10	(Italy) Stefano Gabellini	BMW 320i	+8.135s	6
7	14	(Italy) Moreno Soli	Alfa Romeo 156	+32.078s	4
8	7	(Italy) Romana Bernardoni	Alfa Romeo 156	+34.373s	3
9	16	(Slovakia) Andrej Studenič	Audi A4 Quattro	+35.106s	2
10	18	(Poland) Andrzej Dziurka	Audi A4 Quattro	+1.21.770s	1
11	19	(Germany) Oliver Mayer	Audi A4 Quattro	+3 laps	
12	20	(Italy) Gianluca Roda	Opel Vectra	+4 laps	
13	11	(Netherlands) Peter Kox	Honda Accord	+6 laps	
DNF	9	(Italy) Massimo Pigoli	BMW 320i	+9 laps	
DNF	15	(Italy) Guido Lucchetti Cigarini	Audi A4 Quattro	+10 laps	
DNF	12	(Italy) Sandro Sardelli	BMW 320i	+11 laps	
DNF	6	(Italy) Stefano Bonello	Audi A4 Quattro	+12 laps	
DNS	5	(Italy) Roberto Colciago	Audi A4 Quattro		

=== Championship standings after Round 3 ===
Drivers' Championship standings

Pos	Driver	Points
1	(Italy) Fabrizio Giovanardi	97
2	(Netherlands) Peter Kox	75
3	(Italy) Nicola Larini	70
4	(Italy) Gianni Morbidelli	53
5	(Italy) Gianluca De Lorenzi	48

Teams' Championship standings

Pos	Constructor	Points
1	(Italy) Nordauto Engineering	173
2	(Italy) CiBiEmme Engineering	98
3	(Italy) JAS Engineering	75
4	(Italy) Christy's Team	37
5	(Italy) AGS Motorsport	21

== Round 4 (Italy) Monza ==
Qualifying

Pos	No	Driver	Car	Lap Time
1	11	(Netherlands) Peter Kox	Honda Accord	1.53.318
2	1	(Italy) Fabrizio Giovanardi	Alfa Romeo 156	1.53.448
3	2	(Italy) Nicola Larini	Alfa Romeo 156	1.53.788
4	3	(Italy) Emanuele Naspetti	BMW 320i	1.54.315
5	5	(Italy) Roberto Colciago	Audi A4 Quattro	1.54.338
6	4	(Italy) Gianni Morbidelli	BMW 320i	1.55.067
7	10	(Italy) Stefano Gabellini	BMW 320i	1.55.180
8	12	(Italy) Sandro Sardelli	BMW 320i	1.55.261
9	8	(Italy) Gianluca De Lorenzi	Alfa Romeo 156	1.55.389
10	9	(Italy) Massimo Pigoli	BMW 320i	1.56.366
11	7	(Italy) Romana Bernardoni	Alfa Romeo 156	1.57.019
12	6	(Italy) Stefano Bonello	Audi A4 Quattro	1.57.526
13	14	(Italy) Moreno Soli	Alfa Romeo 156	1.57.607
14	15	(Italy) Guido Lucchetti Cigarini	Audi A4 Quattro	1.58.552
15	18	(Poland) Andrzej Dziurka	Audi A4 Quattro	1.58.991
16	20	(Italy) Gianluca Roda	Opel Vectra	1.59.420

Race 1

Pos	No	Driver	Constructor	Time/Retired	Points
1	5	(Italy) Roberto Colciago	Audi A4 Quattro	9 laps in 18:17.759	20
2	11	(Netherlands) Peter Kox	Honda Accord	+3.480s	15
3	15	(Italy) Guido Lucchetti Cigarini	Audi A4 Quattro	+27.106s	12
4	3	(Italy) Emanuele Naspetti	BMW 320i	+34.844s	10
5	1	(Italy) Fabrizio Giovanardi	Alfa Romeo 156	+35.220s	8
6	14	(Italy) Moreno Soli	Alfa Romeo 155	+35.232s	6
7	8	(Italy) Gianluca De Lorenzi	Alfa Romeo 156	+37.499s	4
8	6	(Italy) Stefano Bonello	Audi A4 Quattro	+54.781s	3
9	4	(Italy) Gianni Morbidelli	BMW 320i	+55.263s	2
10	7	(Italy) Romana Bernardoni	Alfa Romeo 156	+56.404s	1
11	9	(Italy) Massimo Pigoli	BMW 320i	+1.05.522s	
12	12	(Italy) Sandro Sardelli	BMW 320i	+1.05.664s	
13	10	(Italy) Stefano Gabellini	BMW 320i	+1.23.212s	
14	2	(Italy) Nicola Larini	Alfa Romeo 156	+1.28.246s	
15	18	(Poland) Andrzej Dziurka	Audi A4 Quattro	+1 lap	
16 DNF	20	(Italy) Gianluca Roda	Opel Vectra	+3 laps	

Race 2

Pos	No	Driver	Constructor	Time/Retired	Points
1	11	(Netherlands) Peter Kox	Honda Accord	9 laps in 17.21.556	20
2	3	(Italy) Emanuele Naspetti	BMW 320i	+1.548	15
3	4	(Italy) Gianni Morbidelli	BMW 320i	+10.582s	12
4	9	(Italy) Massimo Pigoli	BMW 320i	+21.447s	10
5	14	(Italy) Moreno Soli	Alfa Romeo 156	+43.020s	8
6	6	(Italy) Stefano Bonello	Audi A4 Quattro	+49.668s	6
7	1	(Italy) Fabrizio Giovanardi	Alfa Romeo 156	+53.742	4
8	8	(Italy) Gianluca De Lorenzi	Alfa Romeo 156	+57.339s	3
9	15	(Italy) Guido Lucchetti Cigarini	Audi A4 Quattro	+58.161s	2
10	7	(Italy) Romana Bernardoni	Alfa Romeo 156	+1.13.158s	1
11	20	(Italy) Gianluca Roda	Opel Vectra	+1.15.092s	
12 DNF	2	(Italy) Nicola Larini	Alfa Romeo 156	+1 lap	
DNF	5	(Italy) Roberto Colciago	Audi A4 Quattro	+5 laps	
DNF	12	(Italy) Sandro Sardelli	BMW 320i	+5 laps	
DNF	10	(Italy) Stefano Gabellini	BMW 320i	+6 laps	
DNF	18	(Poland) Andrzej Dziurka	Audi A4 Quattro	+7 laps	

=== Championship standings after Round 4 ===
Drivers' Championship standings

Pos	Driver	Points
1	(Netherlands) Peter Kox	110
2	(Italy) Fabrizio Giovanardi	109
3	(Italy) Nicola Larini	70
3	(Italy) Emanuele Naspetti	70
5	(Italy) Gianni Morbidelli	67

Teams' Championship standings

Pos	Constructor	Points
1	(Italy) Nordauto Engineering	192
2	(Italy) CiBiEmme Engineering	137
3	(Italy) JAS Engineering	110
4	(Italy) AGS Motorsport	50
5	(Italy) Christy's Team	47

== Round 5 (Hungary) Hungaroring ==
Qualifying

Pos	No	Driver	Car	Lap Time
1	1	(Italy) Fabrizio Giovanardi	Alfa Romeo 156	1.42.620
2	11	(Netherlands) Peter Kox	Honda Accord	1.42.694
3	5	(Italy) Roberto Colciago	Audi A4 Quattro	1.43.012
4	2	(Italy) Nicola Larini	Alfa Romeo 156	1.43.247
5	8	(Italy) Gianluca De Lorenzi	Alfa Romeo 156	1.43.306
6	4	(Italy) Gianni Morbidelli	BMW 320i	1.43.711
7	3	(Italy) Emanuele Naspetti	BMW 320i	1.43.797
8	16	(Slovakia) Andrej Studenič	Audi A4 Quattro	1.44.494
9	10	(Italy) Stefano Gabellini	BMW 320i	1.45.209
10	12	(Italy) Sandro Sardelli	BMW 320i	1.45.467
11	9	(Italy) Massimo Pigoli	BMW 320i	1.45.619
12	18	(Poland) Andrzej Dziurka	Audi A4 Quattro	1.45.882
13	14	(Italy) Moreno Soli	Alfa Romeo 156	1.46.340
14	6	(Italy) Stefano Bonello	Audi A4 Quattro	1.46.444
15	7	(Italy) Romana Bernardoni	Alfa Romeo 156	1.47.475
16	21	(Poland) Maciej Stanco	Alfa Romeo 155	1.50.838

Race 1

Pos	No	Driver	Constructor	Time/Retired	Points
1	4	(Italy) Gianni Morbidelli	BMW 320i	11 laps in 19:13.202s	20
2	1	(Italy) Fabrizio Giovanardi	Alfa Romeo 156	+3.236s	15
3	3	(Italy) Emanuele Naspetti	BMW 320i	+11.195s	12
4	11	(Netherlands) Peter Kox	Honda Accord	+14.570s	10
5	2	(Italy) Nicola Larini	Alfa Romeo 156	+14.801s	8
6	8	(Italy) Gianluca De Lorenzi	Alfa Romeo 156	+15.228s	6
7	16	(Slovakia) Andrej Studenič	Audi A4 Quattro	+16.072s	4
8	10	(Italy) Stefano Gabellini	BMW 320i	+17.512s	3
9	9	(Italy) Massimo Pigoli	BMW 320i	+23.752s	2
10	6	(Italy) Stefano Bonello	Audi A4 Quattro	+31.058s	1
11	12	(Italy) Sandro Sardelli	BMW 320i	+33.731s	
12	18	(Poland) Andrzej Dziurka	Audi A4 Quattro	+34.625s	
13	7	(Italy) Romana Bernardoni	Alfa Romeo 156	+34.946s	
14	14	(Italy) Moreno Soli	Alfa Romeo 155	+52.973s	
15	21	(Poland) Maciej Stanco	Alfa Romeo 155	+1:18.117s	
16 DNF	5	(Italy) Roberto Colciago	Audi A4 Quattro	+2 laps	

Race 2

Pos	No	Driver	Constructor	Time/Retired	Points
1	4	(Italy) Gianni Morbidelli	BMW 320i	11 laps 19:12.396s	20
2	3	(Italy) Emanuele Naspetti	BMW 320i	+0.354s	15
3	1	(Italy) Fabrizio Giovanardi	Alfa Romeo 156	+4.945s	12
4	11	(Netherlands) Peter Kox	Honda Accord	+8.856s	10
5	2	(Italy) Nicola Larini	Alfa Romeo 156	+9.117s	8
6	10	(Italy) Stefano Gabellini	BMW 320i	+17.735s	6
7	16	(Slovakia) Andrej Studenič	Audi A4 Quattro	+18.301s	4
8	8	(Italy) Gianluca De Lorenzi	Alfa Romeo 156	+23.323s	3
9	9	(Italy) Massimo Pigoli	BMW 320i	+23.864s	2
10	6	(Italy) Stefano Bonello	Audi A4 Quattro	+30.099s	1
11	7	(Italy) Romana Bernardoni	Alfa Romeo 156	+31.103s	
12	18	(Poland) Andrzej Dziurka	Audi A4 Quattro	+47.024s	
13	14	(Italy) Moreno Soli	Alfa Romeo 156	+54.681s	
14	12	(Italy) Sandro Sardelli	BMW 320i	+59.620s	
15	21	(Poland) Maciej Stanco	Alfa Romeo 155	+1.09.171s	
DNS	5	(Italy) Roberto Colciago	Audi A4 Quattro		

=== Championship standings after Round 5 ===
Drivers' Championship standings

Pos	Driver	Points
1	(Italy) Fabrizio Giovanardi	136
2	(Netherlands) Peter Kox	130
3	(Italy) Gianni Morbidelli	107
4	(Italy) Emanuele Naspetti	97
5	(Italy) Nicola Larini	86

Teams' Championship standings

Pos	Constructor	Points
1	(Italy) Nordauto Engineering	235
2	(Italy) CiBiEmme Engineering	204
3	(Italy) JAS Engineering	130
4	(Italy) Christy's Team	60
5	(Italy) AGS Motorsport	52

== Round 6 (Italy) Imola ==
Qualifying

Pos	No	Driver	Car	Lap Time
1	11	(Netherlands) Peter Kox	Honda Accord	1.56.183
2	2	(Italy) Nicola Larini	Alfa Romeo 156	1.56.499
3	1	(Italy) Fabrizio Giovanardi	Alfa Romeo 156	1.56.680
4	5	(Italy) Roberto Colciago	Audi A4 Quattro	1.56.683
5	8	(Italy) Gianluca De Lorenzi	Alfa Romeo 156	1.56.738
6	3	(Italy) Emanuele Naspetti	BMW 320i	1.56.626
7	9	(Italy) Massimo Pigoli	BMW 320i	1.58.377
8	10	(Italy) Stefano Gabellini	BMW 320i	1.58.669
9	20	(Italy) Gianluca Roda	Opel Vectra	1.58.718
10	12	(Italy) Sandro Sardelli	BMW 320i	1.59.237
11	4	(Italy) Gianni Morbidelli	BMW 320i	1.59.562
12	7	(Italy) Romana Bernardoni	Alfa Romeo 156	1.59.803
13	18	(Poland) Andrzej Dziurka	Audi A4 Quattro	2.00.193
14	14	(Italy) Moreno Soli	Alfa Romeo 156	2.00.279
15	16	(Italy) Guido Lucchetti Cigarini	Audi A4 Quattro	2.00.829

Race 1

Pos	No	Driver	Constructor	Time/Retired	Points
1	5	(Italy) Roberto Colciago	Audi A4 Quattro	10 laps in 19:39.957	20
2	1	(Italy) Fabrizio Giovanardi	Alfa Romeo 156	+1.838s	15
3	11	(Netherlands) Peter Kox	Honda Accord	+3.267s	12
4	3	(Italy) Emanuele Naspetti	BMW 320i	+3.496s	10
5	2	(Italy) Nicola Larini	Alfa Romeo 156	+4.288s	8
6	8	(Italy) Gianluca De Lorenzi	Alfa Romeo 156	+6.227s	6
7	4	(Italy) Gianni Morbidelli	BMW 320i	+9.612s	4
8	10	(Italy) Stefano Gabellini	BMW 320i	+16.625s	3
9	9	(Italy) Massimo Pigoli	BMW 320i	+18.336s	2
10	20	(Italy) Gianluca Roda	Opel Vectra	+24.858s	1
11	12	(Italy) Sandro Sardelli	BMW 320i	+27.124s	
12	7	(Italy) Romana Bernardoni	Alfa Romeo 156	+30.422s	
13	18	(Poland) Andrzej Dziurka	Audi A4 Quattro	+40.182s	
14	14	(Italy) Moreno Soli	Alfa Romeo 155	+54.994s	
DNF	15	(Italy) Guido Lucchetti Cigarini	Audi A4 Quattro	+6 laps	

Race 2

Pos	No	Driver	Constructor	Time/Retired	Points
1	5	(Italy) Roberto Colciago	Audi A4 Quattro	10 laps in 19:35.418	20
2	1	(Italy) Fabrizio Giovanardi	Alfa Romeo 156	+1.767s	15
3	11	(Netherlands) Peter Kox	Honda Accord	+2.703s	12
4	2	(Italy) Nicola Larini	Alfa Romeo 156	+4.593s	10
5	4	(Italy) Gianni Morbidelli	BMW 320i	+11.413s	8
6	9	(Italy) Massimo Pigoli	BMW 320i	+24.771s	6
7	10	(Italy) Stefano Gabellini	BMW 320i	+25.911s	4
8	20	(Italy) Gianluca Roda	Opel Vectra	+27.179s	3
9	8	(Italy) Gianluca De Lorenzi	Alfa Romeo 156	+27.885s	2
10	12	(Italy) Sandro Sardelli	BMW 320i	+35.693s	1
11	3	(Italy) Emanuele Naspetti	BMW 320i	+43.595s	
12	7	(Italy) Romana Bernardoni	Alfa Romeo 156	+44.089s	
13	18	(Poland) Andrzej Dziurka	Audi A4 Quattro	+46.015s	
14	14	(Italy) Moreno Soli	Alfa Romeo 156	+47.151s	
DNS	15	(Italy) Guido Lucchetti Cigarini	Audi A4 Quattro		

=== Championship standings after Round 6 ===
Drivers' Championship standings

Pos	Driver	Points
1	(Italy) Fabrizio Giovanardi	166
2	(Netherlands) Peter Kox	154
3	(Italy) Gianni Morbidelli	119
4	(Italy) Emanuele Naspetti	107
5	(Italy) Nicola Larini	104

Teams' Championship standings

Pos	Constructor	Points
1	(Italy) Nordauto Engineering	283
2	(Italy) CiBiEmme Engineering	226
3	(Italy) JAS Engineering	154
4	(Italy) AGS Motorsport	92
5	(Italy) Christy's Team	75

== Round 7 (Italy) Misano ==
Qualifying

Pos	No	Driver	Car	Lap Time
1	11	(Netherlands) Peter Kox	Honda Accord	1.35.621
2	2	(Italy) Nicola Larini	Alfa Romeo 156	1.35.681
3	5	(Italy) Roberto Colciago	Audi A4 Quattro	1.36.353
4	4	(Italy) Gianni Morbidelli	BMW 320i	1.36.449
5	1	(Italy) Fabrizio Giovanardi	Alfa Romeo 156	1.36.608
6	8	(Italy) Gianluca De Lorenzi	Alfa Romeo 156	1.36.636
7	10	(Italy) Stefano Gabellini	BMW 320i	1.36.745
8	3	(Italy) Emanuele Naspetti	BMW 320i	1.36.788
9	12	(Italy) Sandro Sardelli	BMW 320i	1.37.814
10	9	(Italy) Massimo Pigoli	BMW 320i	1.37.997
11	14	(Italy) Moreno Soli	Alfa Romeo 156	1.38.118
12	6	(Italy) Stefano Bonello	Audi A4 Quattro	1.38.503
13	16	(Italy) Guido Lucchetti Cigarini	Audi A4 Quattro	1.39.639
14	7	(Italy) Romana Bernardoni	Alfa Romeo 156	no time
15	20	(Italy) Gianluca Roda	Opel Vectra	no time

Race 1

Pos	No	Driver	Constructor	Time/Retired	Points
1	4	(Italy) Gianni Morbidelli	BMW 320i	12 laps 19:33.727	20
2	11	(Netherlands) Peter Kox	Honda Accord	+1.604s	15
3	3	(Italy) Emanuele Naspetti	BMW 320i	+3.018s	12
4	1	(Italy) Fabrizio Giovanardi	Alfa Romeo 156	+5.160s	10
5	2	(Italy) Nicola Larini	Alfa Romeo 156	+6.030s	8
6	5	(Italy) Roberto Colciago	Audi A4 Quattro	+7.945s	6
7	10	(Italy) Stefano Gabellini	BMW 320i	+11.980s	4
8	8	(Italy) Gianluca De Lorenzi	Alfa Romeo 156	+12.502s	3
9	9	(Italy) Massimo Pigoli	BMW 320i	+19.687s	2
10	12	(Italy) Sandro Sardelli	BMW 320i	+21.239s	1
11	14	(Italy) Moreno Soli	Alfa Romeo 155	+50.460s	
12	6	(Italy) Stefano Bonello	Audi A4 Quattro	+56.543s	
13 DNF	7	(Italy) Romana Bernardoni	Alfa Romeo 156	+1 lap	
14 DNF	20	(Italy) Gianluca Roda	Opel Vectra	+3 laps	
DNF	15	(Italy) Guido Lucchetti Cigarini	Audi A4 Quattro	+8 laps	

Race 2

Pos	No	Driver	Constructor	Time/Retired	Points
1	4	(Italy) Gianni Morbidelli	BMW 320i	12 laps in 19:35.765s	20
2	3	(Italy) Emanuele Naspetti	BMW 320i	+0.381s	15
3	11	(Netherlands) Peter Kox	Honda Accord	+2.848s	12
4	1	(Italy) Fabrizio Giovanardi	Alfa Romeo 156	+3.218s	10
5	2	(Italy) Nicola Larini	Alfa Romeo 156	+14.355s	8
6	8	(Italy) Gianluca De Lorenzi	Alfa Romeo 156	+15.564s	6
7	5	(Italy) Roberto Colciago	Audi A4 Quattro	+15.975s	4
8	10	(Italy) Stefano Gabellini	BMW 320i	+19.438s	3
9	9	(Italy) Massimo Pigoli	BMW 320i	+24.722s	2
10	6	(Italy) Stefano Bonello	Audi A4 Quattro	+36.357s	1
11	20	(Italy) Gianluca Roda	Opel Vectra	+38.582s	
12	15	(Italy) Guido Lucchetti Cigarini	Audi A4 Quattro	+51.677s	
13	14	(Italy) Moreno Soli	Alfa Romeo 156	+54.231s	
14 DNF	12	(Italy) Sandro Sardelli	BMW 320i	+5 laps	
DNS	7	(Italy) Romana Bernardoni	Alfa Romeo 156		

=== Championship standings after Round 7 ===
Drivers' Championship standings

Pos	Driver	Points
1	(Italy) Fabrizio Giovanardi	186
2	(Netherlands) Peter Kox	181
3	(Italy) Gianni Morbidelli	159
4	(Italy) Emanuele Naspetti	134
5	(Italy) Nicola Larini	120

Teams' Championship standings

Pos	Constructor	Points
1	(Italy) Nordauto Engineering	319
2	(Italy) CiBiEmme Engineering	293
3	(Italy) JAS Engineering	181
4	(Italy) AGS Motorsport	103
5	(Italy) Christy's Team	86

== Round 8 (Czech Republic) Brno Circuit ==
Qualifying

Pos	No	Driver	Car	Lap Time
1	11	(Netherlands) Peter Kox	Honda Accord	2.06.812
2	8	(Italy) Gianluca De Lorenzi	Alfa Romeo 156	2.07.131
3	1	(Italy) Fabrizio Giovanardi	Alfa Romeo 156	2.07.238
4	2	(Italy) Nicola Larini	Alfa Romeo 156	2.07.287
5	5	(Italy) Roberto Colciago	Audi A4 Quattro	2.07.949
6	4	(Italy) Gianni Morbidelli	BMW 320i	2.10.818
7	10	(Italy) Stefano Gabellini	BMW 320i	2.10.818
8	16	(Slovakia) Andrej Studenič	Audi A4 Quattro	2.10.879
9	20	(Italy) Gianluca Roda	Opel Vectra	2.11.124
10	9	(Italy) Massimo Pigoli	BMW 320i	2.11.153
11	23	(Germany) Heinrich Symanzick	Opel Vectra	2.11.259
12	14	(Italy) Moreno Soli	Alfa Romeo 156	2.12.177
13	7	(Italy) Romana Bernardoni	Alfa Romeo 156	2.13.256
14	3	(Italy) Emanuele Naspetti	BMW 320i	no time

Race 1

Pos	No	Driver	Constructor	Time/Retired	Points
1	11	(Netherlands) Peter Kox	Honda Accord	9 laps in 21:31.045	20
2	1	(Italy) Fabrizio Giovanardi	Alfa Romeo 156	+7.867s	15
3	2	(Italy) Nicola Larini	Alfa Romeo 156	+8.875s	12
4	8	(Italy) Gianluca De Lorenzi	Alfa Romeo 156	+16.158s	10
5	5	(Italy) Roberto Colciago	Audi A4 Quattro	+16.532s	8
6	3	(Italy) Emanuele Naspetti	BMW 320i	+20.549s	6
7	10	(Italy) Stefano Gabellini	BMW 320i	+37.763s	4
8	9	(Italy) Massimo Pigoli	BMW 320i	+40.583s	3
9	23	(Germany) Heinrich Symanzick	Opel Vectra	+40.864s	
10	7	(Italy) Romana Bernardoni	Alfa Romeo 156	+40.914s	2
11	20	(Italy) Gianluca Roda	Opel Vectra	+45.612s	1
12	14	(Italy) Moreno Soli	Alfa Romeo 155	+1.00.161s	
DNF	4	(Italy) Gianni Morbidelli	BMW 320i	+8 laps	
DNF	16	(Slovakia) Andrej Studenič	Audi A4 Quattro	+9 laps	

Race 2

Pos	No	Driver	Constructor	Time/Retired	Points
1	5	(Italy) Roberto Colciago	Audi A4 Quattro	9 laps in 20:32.513	20
2	8	(Italy) Gianluca De Lorenzi	Alfa Romeo 156	+1.443s	15
3	4	(Italy) Gianni Morbidelli	BMW 320i	+2.071s	12
4	3	(Italy) Emanuele Naspetti	BMW 320i	+2.431s	10
5	9	(Italy) Massimo Pigoli	BMW 320i	+30.664s	8
6	2	(Italy) Nicola Larini	Alfa Romeo 156	+39.731s	6
7	1	(Italy) Fabrizio Giovanardi	Alfa Romeo 156	+41.334s	4
8	16	(Slovakia) Andrej Studenič	Audi A4 Quattro	+41.602s	3
9	11	(Netherlands) Peter Kox	Honda Accord	+43.976s	2
10	7	(Italy) Romana Bernardoni	Alfa Romeo 156	+1.06.430s	1
11	14	(Italy) Moreno Soli	Alfa Romeo 156	+1.155.113s	
12	23	(Germany) Heinrich Symanzick	Opel Vectra	+1.42.788s	
13 DNF	20	(Italy) Gianluca Roda	Opel Vectra	+4 laps	
DNF	10	(Italy) Stefano Gabellini	BMW 320i	+9 laps	

=== Championship standings after Round 8 ===
Drivers' Championship standings

Pos	Driver	Points
1	(Italy) Fabrizio Giovanardi	205
2	(Netherlands) Peter Kox	203
3	(Italy) Gianni Morbidelli	171
4	(Italy) Emanuele Naspetti	150
5	(Italy) Nicola Larini	138

Teams' Championship standings

Pos	Constructor	Points
1	(Italy) Nordauto Engineering	367
2	(Italy) CiBiEmme Engineering	321
3	(Italy) JAS Engineering	204
4	(Italy) AGS Motorsport	131
5	(Italy) Christy's Team	101

== Round 9 (Italy) Vallelunga ==
Qualifying

Pos	No	Driver	Car	Lap Time
1	11	(Netherlands) Peter Kox	Honda Accord	1.14.075
2	1	(Italy) Fabrizio Giovanardi	Alfa Romeo 156	1.14.152
3	2	(Italy) Nicola Larini	Alfa Romeo 156	1.14.197
4	24	(Italy) Gabriele Tarquini	Honda Accord	1.14.371
5	3	(Italy) Emanuele Naspetti	BMW 320i	1.14.596
6	5	(Italy) Roberto Colciago	Audi A4 Quattro	1.15.043
7	4	(Italy) Gianni Morbidelli	BMW 320i	1.15.330
8	8	(Italy) Gianluca De Lorenzi	Alfa Romeo 156	1.15.404
9	25	(Italy) Fabrizio De Simone	Audi A4 Quattro	1.15.917
10	10	(Italy) Stefano Gabellini	BMW 320i	1.16.075
11	9	(Italy) Massimo Pigoli	BMW 320i	1.16.075
12	26	(Venezuela) Johnny Cecotto	BMW 320i	1.16.722
13	20	(Italy) Gianluca Roda	Opel Vectra	1.17.377
14	16	(Italy) Guido Lucchetti Cigarini	Audi A4 Quattro	1.17.883
15	7	(Italy) Romana Bernardoni	Alfa Romeo 156	1.18.264
16	14	(Italy) Moreno Soli	Alfa Romeo 156	1.18.546

Race 1

Pos	No	Driver	Constructor	Time/Retired	Points
1	1	(Italy) Fabrizio Giovanardi	Alfa Romeo 156	16 laps in 20:15.799	20
2	2	(Italy) Nicola Larini	Alfa Romeo 156	+3.258s	15
3	11	(Netherlands) Peter Kox	Honda Accord	+3.911s	12
4	5	(Italy) Roberto Colciago	Audi A4 Quattro	+4.727s	10
5	4	(Italy) Gianni Morbidelli	BMW 320i	+8.261s	8
6	26	(Venezuela) Johnny Cecotto	BMW 320i	+19.897s	6
7	24	(Italy) Gabriele Tarquini	Honda Accord	+20.673s	4
8	9	(Italy) Massimo Pigoli	BMW 320i	+24.013s	3
9	8	(Italy) Gianluca De Lorenzi	Alfa Romeo 156	+24.108s	2
10	10	(Italy) Stefano Gabellini	BMW 320i	+24.319s	1
11	7	(Italy) Romana Bernardoni	Alfa Romeo 156	+48.015s	
12	15	(Italy) Guido Lucchetti Cigarini	Audi A4 Quattro	+49.675s	
13	20	(Italy) Gianluca Roda	Opel Vectra	+59.008s	
14 DNF	14	(Italy) Moreno Soli	Alfa Romeo 155	+2 laps	
DNF	25	(Italy) Fabrizio De Simone	Audi A4 Quattro	+9 laps	
DNF	3	(Italy) Emanuele Naspetti	BMW 320i	+11 laps	

Race 2

Pos	No	Driver	Constructor	Time/Retired	Points
1	1	(Italy) Fabrizio Giovanardi	Alfa Romeo 156	13 laps in 16:27.751s	20
2	2	(Italy) Nicola Larini	Alfa Romeo 156	+0.362s	15
3	11	(Netherlands) Peter Kox	Honda Accord	+1.335s	12
4	3	(Italy) Emanuele Naspetti	BMW 320i	+5.522s	10
5	26	(Venezuela) Johnny Cecotto	BMW 320i	+10.937s	8
6	5	(Italy) Roberto Colciago	Audi A4 Quattro	+12.203s	6
7	10	(Italy) Stefano Gabellini	BMW 320i	+17.894s	4
8	25	(Italy) Fabrizio De Simone	Audi A4 Quattro	+23.460s	3
9	9	(Italy) Massimo Pigoli	BMW 320i	+24.261s	2
10	20	(Italy) Gianluca Roda	Opel Vectra	+39.425s	
11	4	(Italy) Gianni Morbidelli	BMW 320i	+39.749s	
12	8	(Italy) Gianluca De Lorenzi	Alfa Romeo 156	+40.104s	
13	7	(Italy) Romana Bernardoni	Alfa Romeo 156	+40.716s	
14	15	(Italy) Guido Lucchetti Cigarini	Audi A4 Quattro	+49.723s	
15	14	(Italy) Moreno Soli	Alfa Romeo 156	+57.709s	
DNF	24	(Italy) Gabriele Tarquini	Honda Accord	+13 laps	

=== Championship standings after Round 9 ===
Drivers' Championship standings

Pos	Driver	Points
1	(Italy) Fabrizio Giovanardi	245
2	(Netherlands) Peter Kox	227
3	(Italy) Gianni Morbidelli	179
4	(Italy) Nicola Larini	168
5	(Italy) Emanuele Naspetti	160

Teams' Championship standings

Pos	Constructor	Points
1	(Italy) Nordauto Engineering	437
2	(Italy) CiBiEmme Engineering	339
3	(Italy) JAS Engineering	232
4	(Italy) AGS Motorsport	150
5	(Italy) Christy's Team	111

== Round 10 (Slovenia) Mobikrog ==
Qualifying

Pos	No	Driver	Car	Lap Time
1	5	(Italy) Roberto Colciago	Audi A4 Quattro	1.07.673
2	3	(Italy) Emanuele Naspetti	BMW 320i	1.08.608
3	4	(Italy) Gianni Morbidelli	BMW 320i	1.09.251
4	2	(Italy) Nicola Larini	Alfa Romeo 156	1.09.327
5	25	(Italy) Fabrizio De Simone	Audi A4 Quattro	1.09.794
6	24	(Italy) Gabriele Tarquini	Honda Accord	1.09.947
7	8	(Italy) Gianluca De Lorenzi	Alfa Romeo 156	1.10.404
8	11	(Netherlands) Peter Kox	Honda Accord	1.10.614
9	1	(Italy) Fabrizio Giovanardi	Alfa Romeo 156	1.10.693
10	9	(Italy) Massimo Pigoli	BMW 320i	1.11.094
11	27	(United Kingdom) David Leslie	Honda Accord	1.11.198
12	10	(Italy) Stefano Gabellini	BMW 320i	1.12.428
13	14	(Italy) Moreno Soli	Alfa Romeo 156	1.12.709
14	28	(Slovenia) Mišel Zupančič	BMW 318iS	1.13.808
15	21	(Germany) Heinrich Symanzick	Opel Vectra	1.14.201
16	7	(Italy) Romana Bernardoni	Alfa Romeo 156	1.14.258
17	45	(Federal Republic of Yugoslavia) Tanasije Kuvalja	BMW 318iS	1.19.180
18	20	(Italy) Gianluca Roda	Opel Vectra	no time

Race 1

Pos	No	Driver	Constructor	Time/Retired	Points
1	5	(Italy) Roberto Colciago	Audi A4 Quattro	24 laps in 27:51.033	20
2	2	(Italy) Nicola Larini	Alfa Romeo 156	+52.138s	15
3	3	(Italy) Emanuele Naspetti	BMW 320i	+52.627s	12
4	1	(Italy) Fabrizio Giovanardi	Alfa Romeo 156	+54.323	10
5	9	(Italy) Massimo Pigoli	BMW 320i	+57.458s	8
6	8	(Italy) Gianluca De Lorenzi	Alfa Romeo 156	+1.02.603s	6
7	10	(Italy) Stefano Gabellini	BMW 320i	+1.03.914s	4
8	4	(Italy) Gianni Morbidelli	BMW 320i	+1.07.767s	3
9	11	(Netherlands) Peter Kox	Honda Accord	+1.14.503s	2
10	27	(United Kingdom) David Leslie	Honda Accord	+1.14.833s	1
11	24	(Italy) Gabriele Tarquini	Honda Accord	+1 lap	
12	14	(Italy) Moreno Soli	Alfa Romeo 155	+1 lap	
13	20	(Italy) Gianluca Roda	Opel Vectra	+1 lap	
14	7	(Italy) Romana Bernardoni	Alfa Romeo 156	+1 lap	
15	21	(Germany) Heinrich Symanzick	Opel Vectra	+2 laps	
DNS	28	(Slovenia) Mišel Zupančič	BMW 318iS		
DNS	45	(Federal Republic of Yugoslavia) Tanasije Kuvalja	BMW 318iS		
DNS	25	(Italy) Fabrizio De Simone	Audi A4 Quattro		

Race 2

Pos	No	Driver	Constructor	Time/Retired	Points
1	4	(Italy) Gianni Morbidelli	BMW 320i	24 laps in 28:45.536	20
2	8	(Italy) Gianluca De Lorenzi	Alfa Romeo 156	+8.063s	15
3	2	(Italy) Nicola Larini	Alfa Romeo 156	+24.144s	12
4	9	(Italy) Massimo Pigoli	BMW 320i	+25.283s	10
5	27	(United Kingdom) David Leslie	Honda Accord	+26.526s	8
6	24	(Italy) Gabriele Tarquini	Honda Accord	+27.994s	6
7	14	(Italy) Moreno Soli	Alfa Romeo 156	+54.294s	4
8	11	(Netherlands) Peter Kox	Honda Accord	+56.029s	3
9	3	(Italy) Emanuele Naspetti	BMW 320i	+1.05.455s	2
10	1	(Italy) Fabrizio Giovanardi	Alfa Romeo 156	1.08.882s	1
11	10	(Italy) Stefano Gabellini	BMW 320i	+1 lap	
12	21	(Germany) Heinrich Symanzick	Opel Vectra	+2 laps	
13	7	(Italy) Romana Bernardoni	Alfa Romeo 156	+3 laps	
DNF	5	(Italy) Roberto Colciago	Audi A4 Quattro	+9 laps	
DNF	20	(Italy) Gianluca Roda	Opel Vectra	+20 laps	
DNS	25	(Italy) Fabrizio De Simone	Audi A4 Quattro		
DNS	28	(Slovenia) Mišel Zupančič	BMW 318iS		
DNS	45	(Federal Republic of Yugoslavia) Tanasije Kuvalja	BMW 318iS		

=== Championship standings after Final Round 10 ===
Drivers' Championship standings

Pos	Driver	Points
1	(Italy) Fabrizio Giovanardi	256
2	(Netherlands) Peter Kox	232
3	(Italy) Gianni Morbidelli	202
4	(Italy) Nicola Larini	195
5	(Italy) Emanuele Naspetti	174

Teams' Championship standings

Pos	Constructor	Points
1	(Italy) Nordauto Engineering	489
2	(Italy) CiBiEmme Engineering	376
3	(Italy) JAS Engineering	248
4	(Italy) AGS Motorsport	170
5	(Italy) Christy's Team	133

== Championship standings ==
Points system
**1st**	**2nd**	**3rd**	**4th**	**5th**	**6th**	**7th**	**8th**	**9th**	**10th**
20	15	12	10	8	6	4	3	2	1

No bonus points were awarded for pole positions or fastest laps. All scores counted towards the championship.

=== Drivers' Championship ===
Pos	Driver	Car	MUG (Italy)		PER (Italy)		A1R (Austria)		MON (Italy)		HUN (Hungary)		IMO (Italy)		MIS (Italy)		BRN (Czech Republic)		VAL (Italy)		MOB (Slovenia)		Pts
1	(Italy) Fabrizio Giovanardi	Alfa Romeo 156	4	3	**1**	**1**	2	1	5	7	**2**	3	2	2	4	4	2	7	1	**1**	4	10	256
2	(Netherlands) Peter Kox	Honda Accord	**1**	**1**	2	13	**1**	**13**	**2**	1	4	4	**3**	3	**2**	3	**1**	**9**	**3**	3	9	8	232
3	(Italy) Gianni Morbidelli	BMW 320i	3	4	7	Ret	3	2	9	3	1	**1**	7	5	1	**1**	Ret	3	5	11	8	1	202
4	(Italy) Nicola Larini	Alfa Romeo 156	2	2	3	6	4	3	14	Ret	5	5	5	4	5	5	3	6	2	2	2	3	195
5	(Italy) Emanuele Naspetti	BMW 320i	Ret	6	4	2	6	5	4	2	3	2	4	11	3	2	6	4	Ret	4	3	9	174
6	(Italy) Roberto Colciago	Audi A4 quattro	Ret	7	6	4	Ret	DNS	1	**Ret**	Ret	DNS	1	**1**	6	7	5	1	4	6	**1**	**Ret**	154
7	(Italy) Gianluca de Lorenzi	Alfa Romeo 156	Ret	5	5	3	5	4	7	8	6	8	6	9	8	6	4	2	9	12	6	2	127
8	(Italy) Max Pigoli	BMW 320i	6	8	Ret	7	8	Ret	11	4	9	9	9	6	9	9	8	5	8	9	5	4	76
9	(Italy) Stefano Gabellini	BMW 320i	Ret	9	8	5	9	6	13	Ret	8	6	8	7	7	8	7	Ret	10	7	7	11	57
10	(Italy) Moreno Soli	Alfa Romeo 156	11	14	11	10	15	7	6	5	14	13	14	14	11	13	12	11	Ret	15	12	7	23
11	(Slovakia) Andrej Studenič	Audi A4 quattro	5	10			10	9			7	7					Ret	8					23
12	(Italy) Guido Lucchetti Cigarini	Audi A4 quattro	8	Ret	12	12	Ret	Ret	3	9			Ret	DNS	Ret	12			12	14			17
13	(Venezuela) Johnny Cecotto	BMW 320i																	6	5			14
14	(Italy) Stefano Bonello	Audi A4 quattro	10	12	13	11	14	Ret	8	6	10	10			12	10							13
15	(Italy) Romana Bernardoni	Alfa Romeo 156	12	15	9	8	11	8	10	10	13	11	12	12	Ret	DNS	10	10	11	13	14	13	13
16	(Italy) Gabriele Tarquini	Honda Accord																	7	DNS	11	6	10
17	(Italy) Sandro Sardelli	BMW 320i	7	11	Ret	DNS	7	Ret	12	Ret	11	14	11	10	10	Ret							10
18	(United Kingdom) David Leslie	Honda Accord																			10	5	9
19	(Italy) Gianluca Roda	Opel Vectra					DNS	12	Ret	11			10	8	Ret	11	11	13	13	10	13	Ret	6
20	(Poland) Andrzej Dziurka	Audi A4 quattro	9	13	10	9	12	10	15	Ret	12	12	13	13									6
21	(Italy) Fabrizio de Simone	Audi A4 quattro																	NC	8	DNS	DNS	3
22	(Germany) Oliver Mayer	Audi A4 quattro					13	11															0
23	(Poland) Maciej Stanco	Alfa Romeo 155 TS									15	15											0
NC	(Slovenia) Mišel Zupančič	BMW 318iS																			DNS	DNS	0
NC	(Federal Republic of Yugoslavia) Tanasije Kuvalja	BMW 318is																			DNS	DNS	0
Guest drivers ineligible for points.
	(Germany) Heinrich Symanzick	Opel Vectra															9	12			15	12	0
Pos	Driver	MUG (Italy)		PER (Italy)		A1R (Austria)		MON (Italy)		HUN (Hungary)		IMO (Italy)		MIS (Italy)		BRN (Czech Republic)		VAL (Italy)		MOB (Slovenia)		Pts	

Colour	Result
Gold	Winner
Silver	Second place
Bronze	Third place
Green	Points classification
Blue	Non-points classification
Blue	Non-classified finish (NC)
Purple	Retired, not classified (Ret)
Red	Did not qualify (DNQ)
Red	Did not pre-qualify (DNPQ)
Black	Disqualified (DSQ)
White	Did not start (DNS)
White	Withdrew (WD)
White	Race cancelled (C)
Blank	Did not practice (DNP)
Blank	Did not arrive (DNA)
Blank	Excluded (EX)

**Bold** - Pole
Italics - Fastest lap

==== Teams' Championship ====
Points were awarded on a 20, 15, 12, 10, 8, 6, 4, 3, 2, 1 basis to the top 10 finishers in each race, however only the two highest placed cars from each team scored points. No bonus points were awarded for pole positions or fastest laps. All scores counted towards the championship.

Pos	Driver	MUG (Italy)		PER (Italy)		A1R (Austria)		MON (Italy)		HUN (Hungary)		IMO (Italy)		MIS (Italy)		BRN (Czech Republic)		VAL (Italy)		MOB (Slovenia)		Pts	
1	Nordauto Engineering	2	2	1	1	2	1	5	7	2	3	2	2	4	4	2	2	1	1	2	2	489	
1	Nordauto Engineering	4	3	3	3	4	3	7	8	5	5	5	4	5	5	3	6	2	2	4	3	489	
2	CiBiEmme Engineering	3	4	4	2	3	2	4	2	1	1	4	5	1	1	6	3	5	4	3	1	376	
2	CiBiEmme Engineering	Ret	6	7	Ret	6	5	9	3	3	2	7	11	3	2	Ret	4	Ret	11	8	9	376	
3	JAS Engineering	1	1	2	13	1	13	2	1	4	4	3	3	2	3	1	9	3	3	9	5	248	
3	JAS Engineering																	7	DNS	10	6	248	
4	AGS Motorsport	10	7	6	4	14	Ret	1	6	10	10	1	1	6	7	5	1	4	6	1	Ret	170	
4	AGS Motorsport	Ret	12	13	11	Ret	DNS	8	Ret	Ret	DNS			12	10			NC	8	DNS	DNS	170	
5	Christy's Team	6	8	8	5	8	6	11	4	8	6	8	6	7	8	7	5	8	7	5	4	133	
5	Christy's Team	Ret	9	Ret	7	9	Ret	13	Ret	9	9	9	7	9	9	8	Ret	10	9	7	11	133	
6	Team Isert	7	11	Ret	DNS	7	Ret	12	Ret	11	14	11	10	10	Ret			6	5			24	
7	Soli Racing Team	11	14	11	10	15	7	6	5	14	13	14	14	11	13	12	11	Ret	15	12	7	23	
8	National Team Slovakia	5	10			10	9			7	7					Ret	8					23	
9	Nath Racing	8	Ret	12	12	Ret	Ret	3	9			Ret	DNS	Ret	12			12	14			17	
10	Greyhound Motorsport					DNS	12	Ret	11			10	8	Ret	11	11	13	13	10	13	Ret	6	
11	Alda Motorsport	9	13	10	9	12	10	15	Ret	12	12	13	13									6	
11	Alda Motorsport									15	15											6	
12	Oliver Mayer Motorsport					13	11															0	
NC	Plamtex Sport Olimpija																			DNS	DNS	0	
NC	AL Lamko Novial																			DNS	DNS	0	
Guest teams ineligible for points.
	Raceline Racing Team															9	12			15	12	0	
Pos	Driver	Car	MUG (Italy)		PER (Italy)		A1R (Austria)		MON (Italy)		HUN (Hungary)		IMO (Italy)		MIS (Italy)		BRN (Czech Republic)		VAL (Italy)		MOB (Slovenia)		Pts

Colour	Result
Gold	Winner
Silver	Second place
Bronze	Third place
Green	Points classification
Blue	Non-points classification
Blue	Non-classified finish (NC)
Purple	Retired, not classified (Ret)
Red	Did not qualify (DNQ)
Red	Did not pre-qualify (DNPQ)
Black	Disqualified (DSQ)
White	Did not start (DNS)
White	Withdrew (WD)
White	Race cancelled (C)
Blank	Did not practice (DNP)
Blank	Did not arrive (DNA)
Blank	Excluded (EX)
