= Tanasije Kuvalja =

Yugoslav cyclist

Personal information
- Born: 24 July 1946 (age 80) Razboj Ljevčanski, Srbac FPR Yugoslavia

Cycling career
- Sport: Cycling

Tanasije Kuvalja (born 24 July 1946) is a Yugoslav former cyclist. He competed in the individual road race and the team time trial events at the 1968 Summer Olympics. He is also a former auto racing driver who competed in the Serbia Touring Car Championship, winning it twice driving a BMW 320i.

He also competed in a round of the European Super Touring Cup at MobiKrog in Slovenia in 2000. However, both Kuvalja and Slovene driver Mišel Zupančič failed to start the race.
