= European Touring Car Cup =

Auto racing championship in Europe

- Race action at the FIA European Touring Car Cup
- Category: Touring cars
- Country: Europe
- Inaugural season: 2005
- Folded: 2017
- Classes: Super 2000, Super 1600, TCR (later years)
- Last Drivers' champion: (Czech Republic) Petr Fulín
- Official website: www.fiaetcc.com

The FIA European Touring Car Cup was an annual touring car racing event, which had been held at various locations across Europe from 2005 to 2017. Unlike in previous years where it was a one-off event, in 2010 the series was a three-round event.

== History ==
It was created when the European Touring Car Championship finished at the end of 2004, being superseded by the World Touring Car Championship.

The cars that are eligible are those complying with the FIA Super 2000, Super 2000 Diesel, Super Production and Super 1600 technical regulations. The drivers must either have competed in a minimum of 50% of their own National Championships; been designated by their ASN (National Sporting Authority) and have not taken part in the FIA WTCC with a Manufacturer's team or belong to a country in which there is no national Championship and been designated by their ASN. In 2012 the Single Make Trophy was introduced for cars such as SEAT León Supercopa and Renault Clio Cup. From the 2013 season Diesel engines and the Super Production regulations were outlawed and thus only petrol engined Super 2000 (in 2014 the older 1.6 turbocharged Super 2000 spec cars were also allowed), SEAT León Supercopa (replaced in 2015 by the new SEAT León Cup Racer) and Super 1600 cars are allowed.

Further changes were made in 2015 (with effect from the 2016 season) - the Single Make Trophy (renamed TCN-2) and Super 2000 (TC2 & TC2T) classes were merged into single category, while Super 1600 was retained as a standalone category. In January 2016 it was revealed the new branding of the series with the introduction of new logo similar to the styling of recent FIA series such as FIA World Endurance Championship. For the 2017 season the unified Super 2000 (TCN-2/TCR, TC2 and TC2-T) was renamed ETCC-1 while the Super 1600 cars were renamed ETCC-2.

The event was organised by Eurosport Events, which has also organised the World Touring Car Championship and European Rally Championship. The races were occasionally broadcast live or via 30 minute highlights on Eurosport.

== Event format ==
- Saturday: two 30-minute practice sessions; one 30-minute qualifying session
- Sunday: one 15-minute warm-up session; two back-to-back 50 km races
- The grid of Race 2 is determined by Race 1 results, with top-8 in reverse order

In 2010 the event format will change from a one-off event to four separate events over the year.

== Point scoring system ==
In each class - Super 2000 and Super 1600 points are awarded in each of the two races in the following way:

- 1st 10 points; 2nd 8 points; 3rd 6 points; 4th 5 points; 5th 4 points; 6th 3 points; 7th 2 points; 8th 1 point

== Titles ==
The points scored count towards the following trophies (as of 2016):

- FIA Drivers’ European Touring Car Cup Super 2000
- FIA Drivers’ European Touring Car Cup Super 1600

== Champions ==
Year	Super 2000/TC2 Turbo/ETCC1		Super Production/TC2		Super 1600/ETCC2		Single Makes Trophy	
Year	Driver	Car	Driver	Car	Driver	Car	Driver	Car
2005	(Sweden) Richard Göransson	BMW 320i	(Italy) Lorenzo Falessi	Alfa Romeo 147 SP	not held		not held	
2006	(United Kingdom) Ryan Sharp	SEAT León	(Russia) Aleksandr Lvov	Honda Civic Type R	not held		not held	
2007	(Denmark) Michel Nykjær	SEAT León	(Russia) Aleksey Basov	Honda Civic Type R	not held		not held	
2008	(Denmark) Michel Nykjær	Chevrolet Lacetti	(Italy) Fabio Fabiani	BMW 320i	(Germany) Ralf Martin	Ford Fiesta ST	not held	
2009	(United Kingdom) James Thompson	Honda Accord Euro R	(Latvia) Marcis Birkens	Honda Civic Type R	(Germany) Carsten Seifert	Ford Fiesta ST	not held	
2010	(United Kingdom) James Thompson	Honda Accord Euro R	(Serbia) Vojislav Lekić	Honda Civic Type R	(Germany) Carsten Seifert	Ford Fiesta ST	not held	
2011	(Italy) Fabrizio Giovanardi	Honda Accord Euro R	(Serbia) Aleksandar Tosić	Honda Civic Type R	(Germany) Thomas Mühlenz	Ford Fiesta ST	not held	
2012	(Spain) Fernando Monje	SEAT León	(Russia) Nikolay Karamyshev	Honda Civic Type R	(Germany) Kevin Krammes	Ford Fiesta 1.6 16V	(Norway) Stian Paulsen	SEAT León Supercopa
2013	(Czech Republic) Petr Fulín	BMW 320si	not held		(Germany) Kevin Krammes	Ford Fiesta 1.6 16V	(Austria) Mario Dablander	SEAT León Supercopa
2014	(Russia) Nikolay Karamyshev	Chevrolet Cruze 1.6T	(Czech Republic) Petr Fulín	BMW 320si	(Luxembourg) Gilles Bruckner	Ford Fiesta 1.6 16V	(Russia) Dmitry Bragin	SEAT León Supercopa
2015	(Georgia (country)) Davit Kajaia	BMW 320 TC	(Czech Republic) Michal Matějovský	BMW 320si	(Germany) Niklas Mackschin	Ford Fiesta 1.6 16V	(Serbia) Dušan Borković	SEAT León Cup Racer
2016	(Switzerland) Kris Richard	Honda Civic TCR	not held		(Germany) Niklas Mackschin	Ford Fiesta 1.6 16V	not held	
2017	(Czech Republic) Petr Fulín	SEAT León TCR	not held		not held		not held	

== Event winners ==
=== European Touring Car Cup (Super 2000/TC2 Turbo/ETCC1) ===
Drivers
	Driver	Total
1	(Czech Republic) Petr Fulín	12
2	(Russia) Nikolay Karamyshev	7
3	(Slovakia) Maťo Homola	5
4	(Serbia) Dušan Borković	6
4	(Spain) Fernando Monje	6
4	(Denmark) Michel Nykjær	6
7	(Switzerland) Kris Richard	4
8	(Ukraine) Igor Skuz	2
8	(United Kingdom) James Thompson	2
8	(United Kingdom) Ryan Sharp	2
10	(North Macedonia) Igor Stefanovski	1
10	(Germany) Franz Engstler	1
10	(Germany) Andreas Pfister	1
10	(Hungary) Ferenc Ficza	1
10	(Hungary) Norbert Kiss	1
10	(Austria) Mario Dablander	1
10	(Spain) Jordi Oriola	1
10	(Czech Republic) Michal Matějovský	1
10	(Italy) Fabrizio Giovanardi	1
10	(Spain) Pepe Oriola	1
10	(Portugal) César Campaniço	1
10	(Hungary) Norbert Michelisz	1
10	(Spain) Oscar Nogués	1
10	(Sweden) Tomas Engström	1
10	(United Kingdom) Jason Plato	1
10	(Italy) Alex Zanardi	1
10	(Portugal) Manuel Pedro Fernandes	1

Manufacturers
	Constructor	Total
1	(Spain) SEAT	39
2	(Germany) BMW	11
3	(United States) Chevrolet	9
4	(Japan) Honda	8
5	(Italy) Alfa Romeo	1

Cars
	Car	Total
1	SEAT León Cup Racer	17
2	SEAT León	11
3	Cruze 1.6T	8
3	BMW 320si	8
5	SEAT León TDI	5
6	Honda Civic TCR	4
6	Honda Accord Euro R	4
7	SEAT León Supercopa	3
9	BMW 320 TC	2
10	Alfa Romeo 156	1
10	SEAT León TFSI	1
10	SEAT León 2.0 TDI	1
10	Chevrolet Lacetti	1
10	SEAT Toledo Cupra	1
10	BMW 320i	1

== See also ==
- List of European Touring Car Cup drivers
