= Fabrizio Giovanardi =

Italian racing driver (born 1966)

Fabrizio Giovanardi "Piedone"
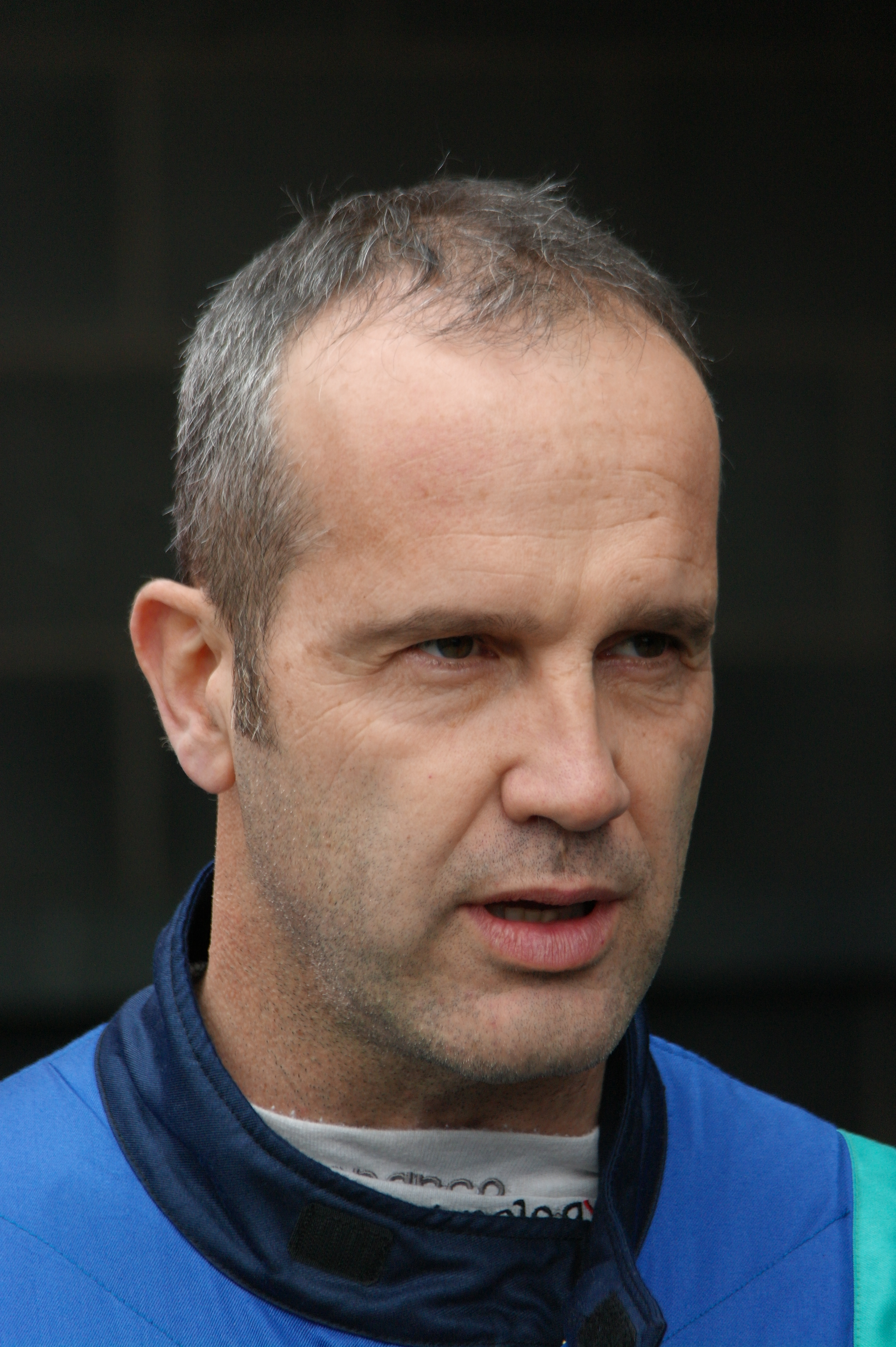
- Giovanardi at the Donington round of the 2014 British Touring Car Championship
- Nationality: Italian
- Born: 14 December 1966 (age 59) Sassuolo, Italy

Previous series
- 2011 2010, 2013 2008 2006 2006 2005 2004 2003 2002 2001 2000 1999 1998 1997 1996 1995 1991–99 1989–91 1989 1989 1987–88, 1990: STCC; Superstars Series; V8 Supercars; TC 2000; WTCC; WTCC; ETCC; ETCC; ETCC; Euro STC; Euro STC; STW; STW; CET; CET; DTM; Italian Superturismo; International Formula 3000; IMSA GT Championship; Renault 21 European Cup; Italian Formula Three

Championship titles
- 2011 2008 2007 2002 2001 2000 1999 1998 1997 1992: ETCC; BTCC; BTCC; ETCC; Euro STC; Euro STC; Italian Superturismo; Italian Superturismo; CET; Italian Superturismo Class S2

Fabrizio "Piedone" Giovanardi (born 14 December 1966 in Sassuolo) is an Italian racing driver. During his career he has won ten touring car titles, including European and British crowns making him the most successful touring car driver worldwide. He has spent the majority of his career racing for Alfa Romeo and Vauxhall.

== Career ==
=== Formula Three ===
After winning both the Italian and World Formula C karting titles for 125cc karts in 1986, Giovanardi stepped up to the Italian Formula Three Championship in 1987, driving a Reynard 873 powered by Alfa Romeo for PreMa Racing, where he scored a podium en route to thirteenth position in the championship. He stayed in the series in 1988, where he secured two wins at Vallelunga and Enna-Pergusa and finished third overall in the championship, a point behind runner-up Mauro Martini and two points behind season champion Emanuele Naspetti. He returned to the series in 1990, competing in a single round.

=== Formula 3000 ===
In 1989, Giovanardi switched to International Formula 3000 to compete with First Racing and won the race at Vallelunga. Those were his only points however, as he ended up tenth in the final championship standings; failing to qualify for races at Silverstone, Brands Hatch and Le Mans. He continued in the series in 1990 with First Racing, and again ended up tenth in the championship with a best result of second place at Pau. 1991 was his final season, and finished in a three-way tie for eleventh place.

=== Super Touring Cars ===
Giovanardi dabbled into the Superturismo in the 1991 season, competing in a Peugeot 405. He took five Class S2 victories which set him up for a full campaign in the 1992 season. In his first full season, he was champion in the S2 class taking eight race wins and being crowned champion, his first touring car title. He moved into the main class of the championship with Peugeot in 1993, finishing in the top three overall twice (second in 1993 and third in 1994), and winning five races before moving to Nordauto Engineering Alfa Romeo in 1995. In his début season with Alfa, Giovanardi again finished in third place, beating his team-mate Antonio Tamburini in a tie. He also contested one round of the Deutsche Tourenwagen Meisterschaft at the Norisring, driving an Alfa Romeo 155 for the factory Alfa Corse team.

In 1996 he continued to race in Superturismo and he also participated to some rounds of CET always with Nordauto Engineering. He finished fifth in Italy, and one place lower in Spain, taking five wins over the two series. In 1997 he continued in both championship Superturismo and CET driving for the last time Alfa Romeo 155 Ts. He won all four races of CET before that serie was cancelled due to lack of cars and he finished second in Superturismo with five victories behind Naspetti. He got the better of Naspetti in 1998, dominating the Italian championship in the new Alfa Romeo 156 with nine victories and eighteen podium on twenty races. Giovanardi and team-mate Nicola Larini made a guest appearance in the STW at the Norisring, where they both finished outside the top ten placings in both races.

He became again Italian champion in 1999, again beating his BMW rival Naspetti in a thrilling last race in Vallelunga; Giovanardi's advantage at the end of the season was only fourteen points after ten rounds. Giovanardi and Larini made a return to the STW at the series' Italian round at Misano, and the Alfa drivers finished 1–2 in the sprint race before both retired in the feature race. The Superturismo was promoted to become the Euro STC in 2000, and again Giovanardi won the title with Nordauto. Consistency was the key to become again champion in the new European Championship Euro STC in 2001, winning just three races and ten podium.

Giovanardi also got his first Formula One test as a test driver for Ferrari on 1 February 2001, replacing the injured Luca Badoer, who crashed heavily several weeks before. He was the official test driver of the team until September of that year, when Badoer healed and returned to his testing duties.

=== European/World Touring Car Championship ===
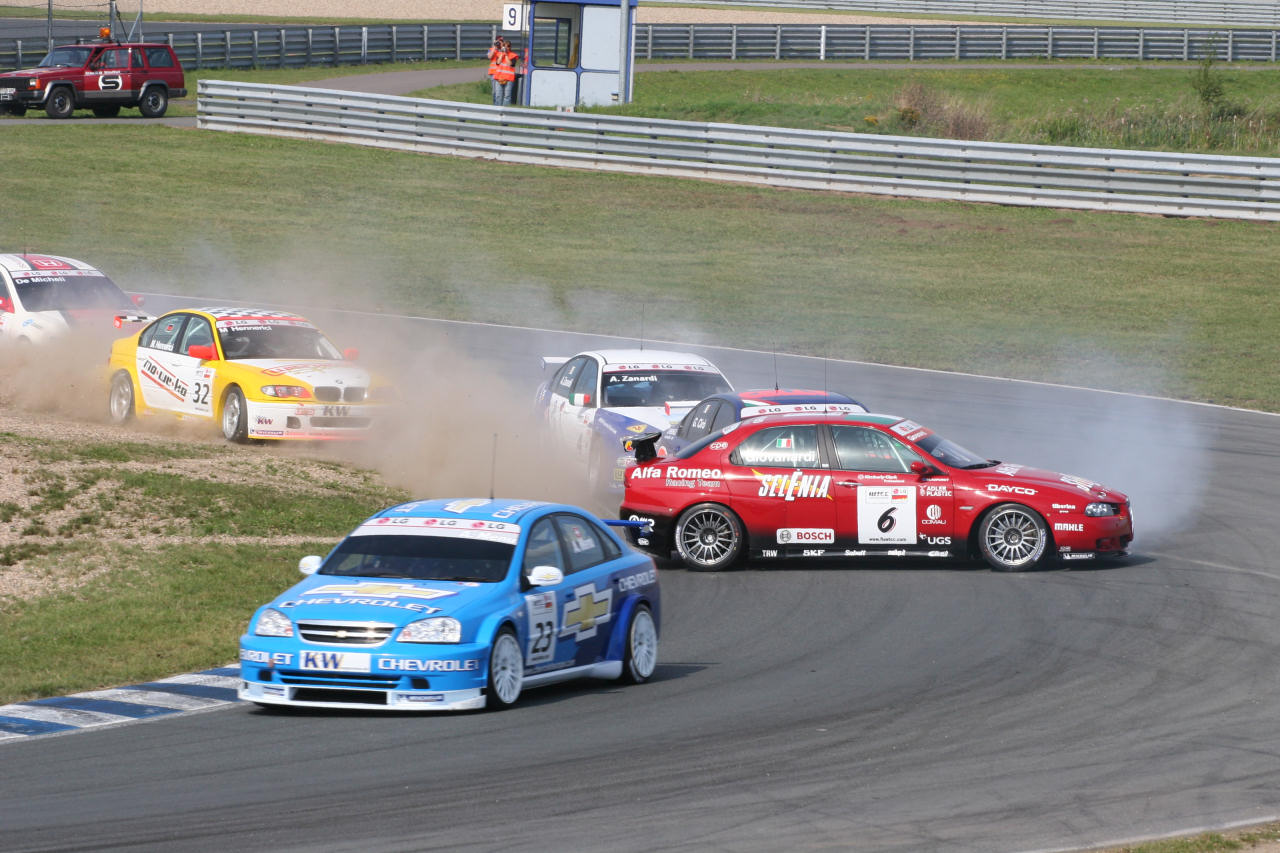
Giovanardi (#6) and Giuseppe Cirò collide during the first race at Oschersleben in 2005.

In 2002, the European Touring Car Championship returned as a complete entity using the Super 2000 regulations. The regulation change did not hinder Giovanardi as he won a touring car title for the fifth successive season, again at the wheel of an Alfa Romeo. However, he switched to a Ravaglia Motorsport-run BMW for the 2003 season, but struggled with the rear-wheel-drive car taking only three podiums en route to ninth in the championship. Unsurprisingly, Giovanardi returned to the wheel of an Alfa in 2004 as part of a four-car team by Autodelta, the new name for Nordauto. Giovanardi took a single victory at Valencia as he finished sixth in the championship, finishing behind team-mate Gabriele Tarquini, the first such occasion of Giovanardi being beaten by a team-mate.

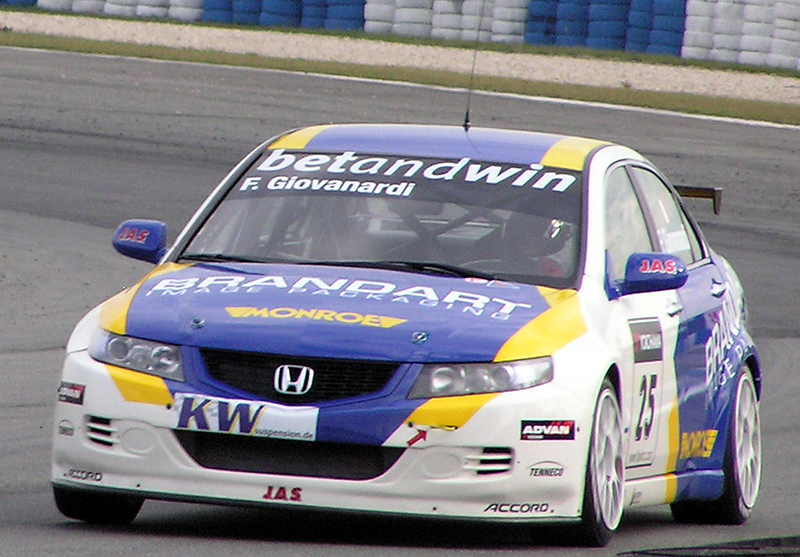
Giovanardi competing in the 2006 World Touring Car Championship.

With the European series becoming the World Touring Car Championship in 2005 – the first such championship season since 1987 – Giovanardi was part of the Alfa factory outfit, alongside Tarquini, James Thompson and Augusto Farfus, with André Couto joining the quartet at his home round in Macau. Giovanardi took a season-high four victories, as he finished as the highest-placed Alfa Romeo driver in the championship, finishing behind the BMWs of champion Andy Priaulx and Dirk Müller. His final appearance in the series to date came in 2006, when he replaced Pierre-Yves Corthals in Curitiba, Brazil and joined Corthals in Macau for JAS Motorsport; taking a best result of fourth in the opening Macau race.

In 2011, Giovanardi won the European Touring Car Cup at the Salzburgring in Austria. He clinched Hartmann Racing's third consecutive European Touring Car Cup, in a Honda Accord.

=== British Touring Car Championship ===
==== VX Racing/Triple Eight (2006–2010) ====
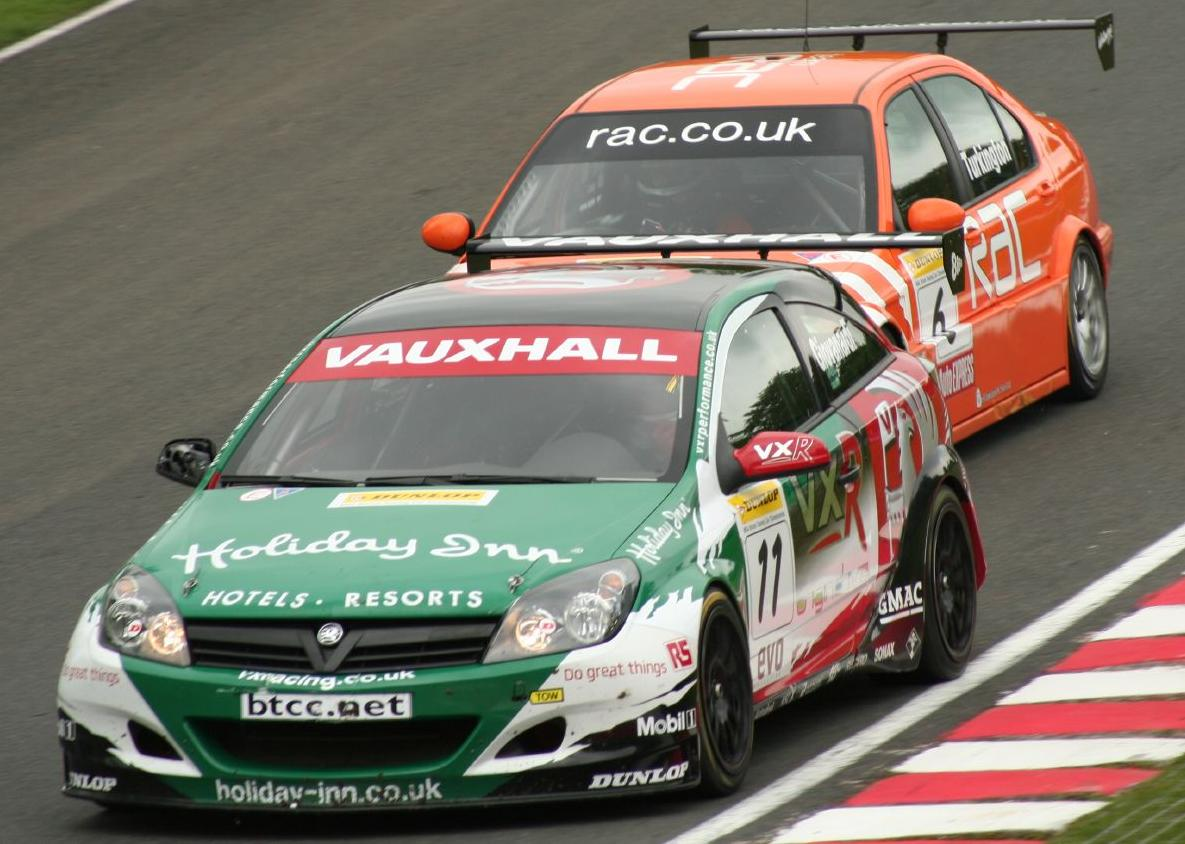
Giovanardi driving the VX Racing-run Vauxhall Astra Sport Hatch during the Oulton Park round in 2006. He is followed closely by Colin Turkington.

With Alfa Romeo pulling out of the WTCC, Giovanardi began searching for a replacement drive for the 2006 season. In late 2005 Giovanardi tested a Vauxhall Astra Sport Hatch for the Triple Eight BTCC team at Pembrey in Wales. The team duly signed him, and Tom Chilton up to drive for the team in 2006. Gavin Smith would later join the team, making it a three-car Vauxhall effort.

It was a testing year for the team and Giovanardi, as he came close to a first win at Donington Park before a final-corner collision with West Surrey Racing's Colin Turkington. Giovanardi led into the chicane before an outbraking move by Turkington put him alongside at the apex. Both cut the chicane after the collision, and Turkington got to the line first, taking his second win of the season. Ultimately, his first win – and Vauxhall's 100th in the British Touring Car Championship – came at Knockhill. Fittingly, he was congratulated on live TV by John Cleland, the man who took Vauxhall's first win. He then secured a second win in the series at Brands Hatch; finishing his first BTCC campaign in fifth position, passing James Thompson by a single point at the final meeting of the season at Silverstone. Giovanardi and Chilton both remained with the team into the 2007 season, driving the team's new Vauxhall Vectra in the championship.

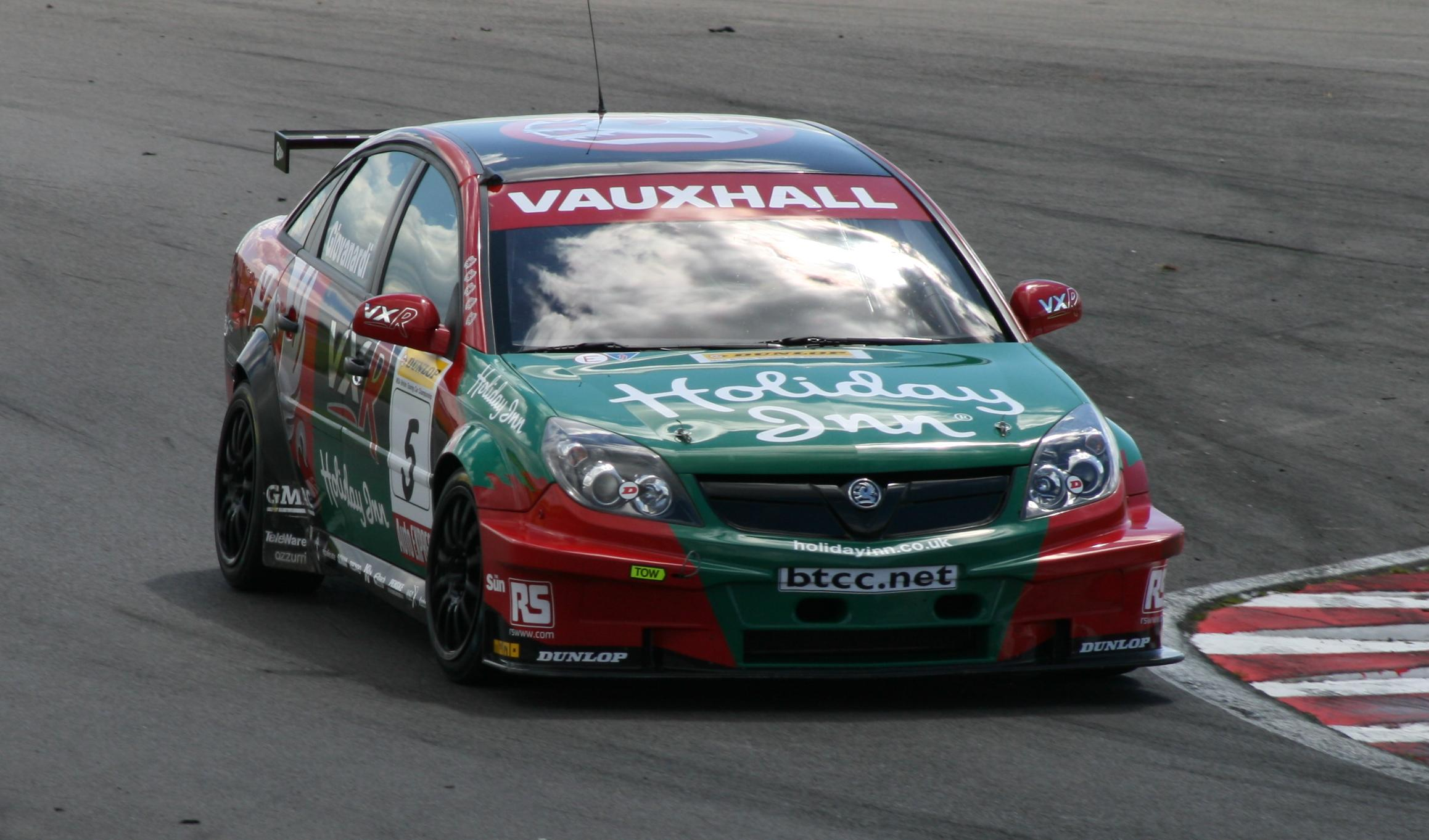
Giovanardi driving the VX Racing-run Vauxhall Vectra during the Snetterton round of the 2007 BTCC season.

The Vectra seemed to suit the driving style of Giovanardi better than his young team-mate, with Giovanardi taking ten wins to Chilton's tally of none. Indeed, Giovanardi was involved in a season-long championship battle with SEAT Sport's Jason Plato, with Plato leading 265-256 into the final round, having not finished outside the top eight positions in the first 27 rounds of the championship. In the first two races at Thruxton, Giovanardi led Plato home and thus Plato held a one-point lead going into the final race. With the top seven places reversed on the grid, Plato started sixth and Giovanardi seventh; but it was the Italian who made the quicker progress through the pack, and with his second place compared to Plato's fourth, Giovanardi claimed his first BTCC title by three points.

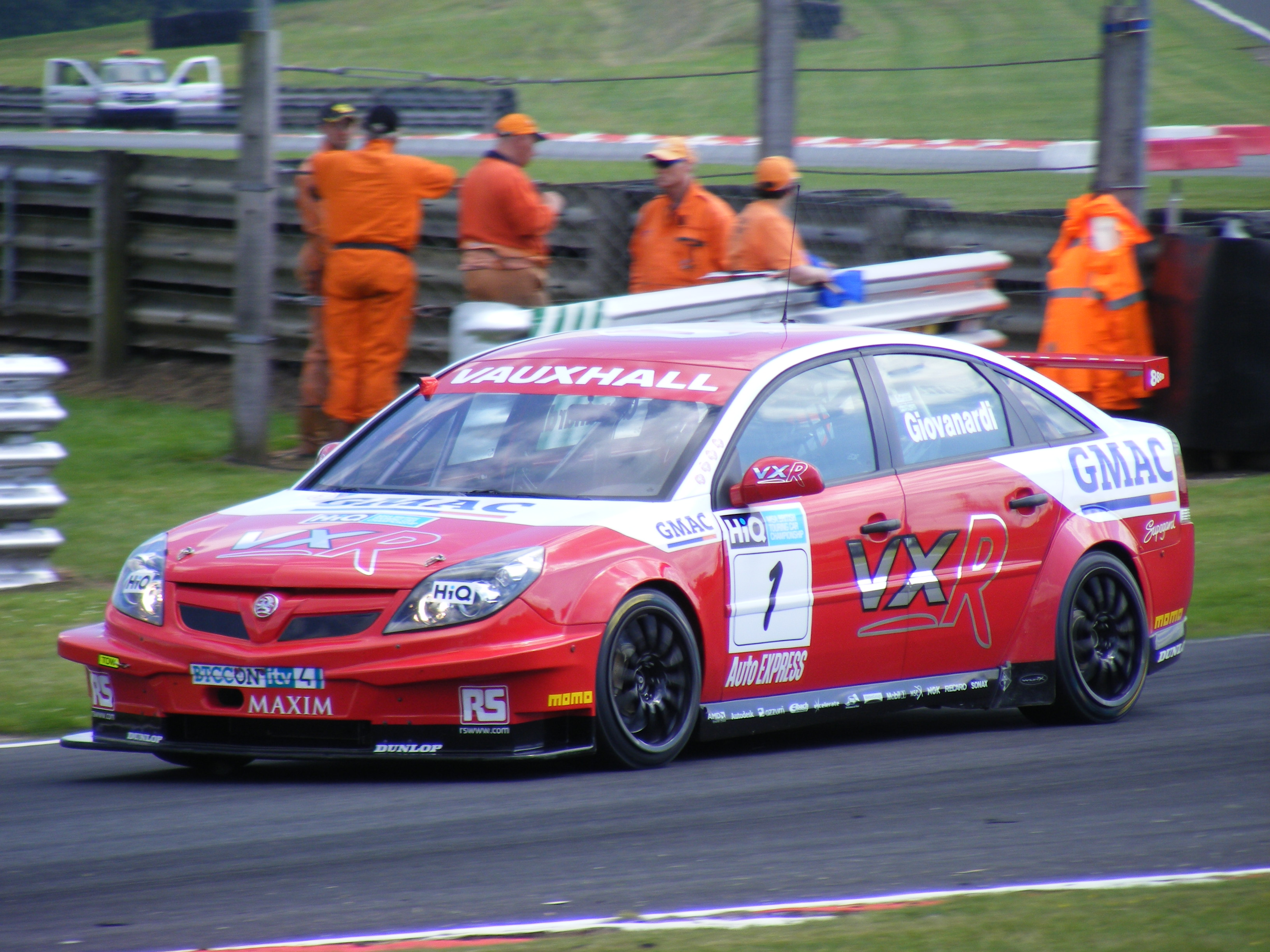
Giovanardi driving for VX Racing at the Oulton Park round of the 2008 BTCC season.

In 2008, Chilton left for Team Dynamics, and thus Giovanardi was joined by new team-mates Matt Neal (joining from Dynamics) and Tom Onslow-Cole (joining from West Surrey Racing) in a three-car team. Giovanardi was the driver to beat, and sealed the title convincingly at Brands Hatch, with two races to spare; clinching the title with a non-scoring fourteenth position, due to the result of rival Plato (fifth), he could no longer be caught in the title race. Until the first race at Brands, Giovanardi had been on a run of 39 consecutive points finishes which had begun at round 19 of the 2007 season, at Snetterton in late July. He failed to score a top ten finish in the entire round, after failing to start in the second race and finishing eleventh in the final race. His only point came from the fastest lap of the final race. Plato finished third in the championship, as Mat Jackson overhauled his points tally after a good final weekend of the season.

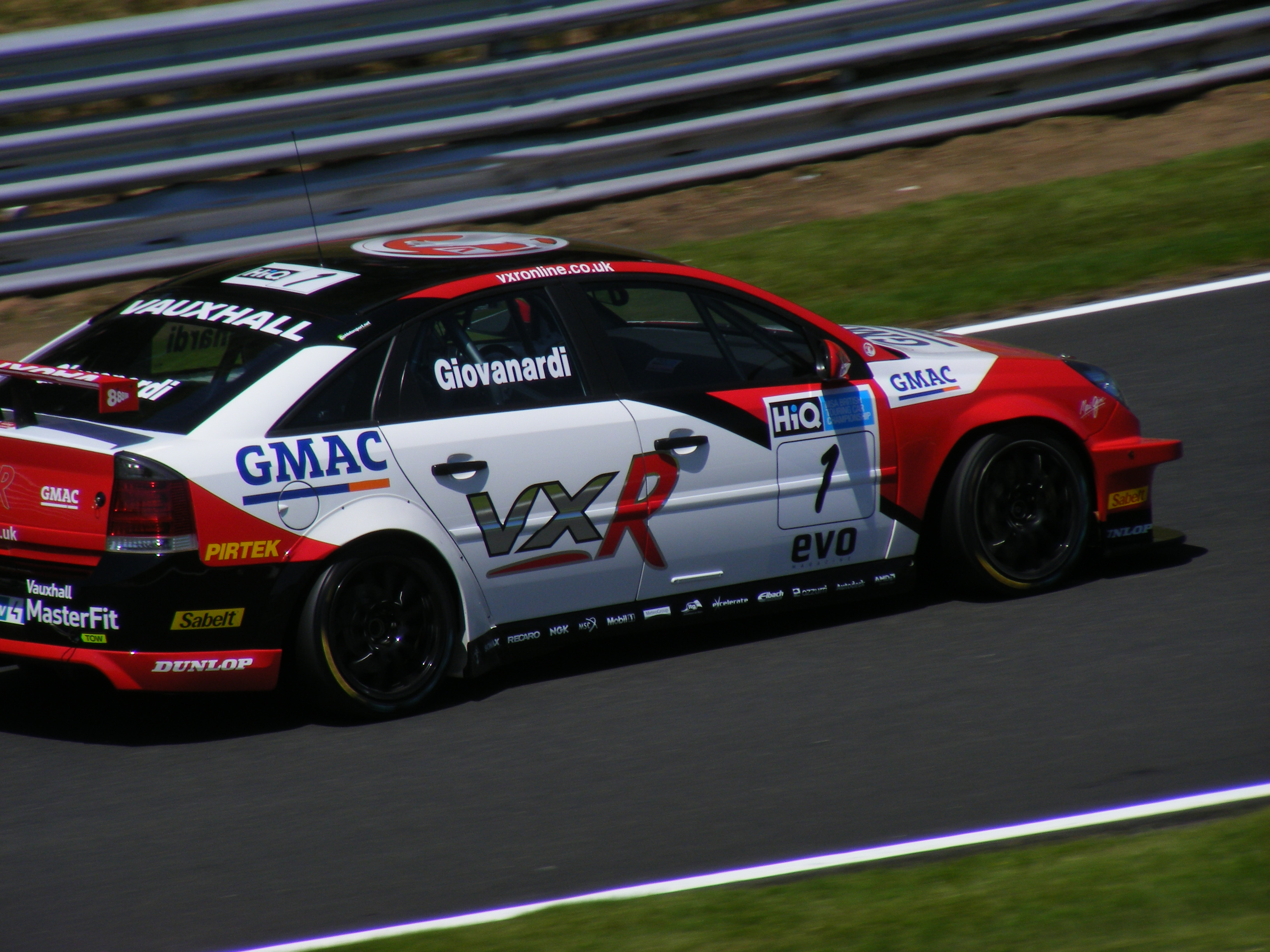
Giovanardi competing in the fourth event of the 2009 BTCC season at Oulton Park.

Giovanardi and Neal were joined at VX Racing by Andrew Jordan for the 2009 season, which would be the final season of manufacturer effort by Vauxhall. Vauxhall cited the economic downturn as the main reason for pulling out at the end of the season. Giovanardi was once again in the running for the title, alongside Turkington and Plato. Indeed, Giovanardi trailed Turkington by thirteen points heading to the final round of the season, held on the Grand Prix circuit at Brands Hatch. By the final race of the afternoon, a three-way title battle was still the situation, as Turkington had 262 points, Giovanardi 258 and Plato 254 – having won the first two races – with a maximum of seventeen points available. A titanic battle for the lead ensued and was not settled until the final lap of the race. Plato won the race becoming the only second driver to win all three races at a BTCC meeting, with Turkington finishing second to win his first title. Giovanardi finished in fourth position, and thus finished third in the championship standings.

Giovanardi struggled to find a top-line drive for the 2010 season, but returned to the BTCC at the 2010 season-opening round at Thruxton. He drove the #888 Vauxhall Vectra for Triple Eight, partnering 2009 Clio Cup UK champion Phil Glew, who made his BTCC début at the meeting. He won the first two races of the season before taking a fifth-place finish in race three to secure a seven-point lead from Jason Plato in the championship. The team had hoped to run Giovanardi for the remainder of the season, but he was replaced by James Nash ahead of the second round at Rockingham due to sponsor Uniq pulling out.

Instead, Giovanardi found a temporary home in the Italian-based Superstars Series, driving N.Technology's brand new Porsche Panamera S, and won a race on the car's début at Mugello. Giovanardi claimed three wins in succession at Paul Ricard and Vallelunga enabling him to finish sixth in the series' Italian championship, while he lies fifth in the international points, with one round left.

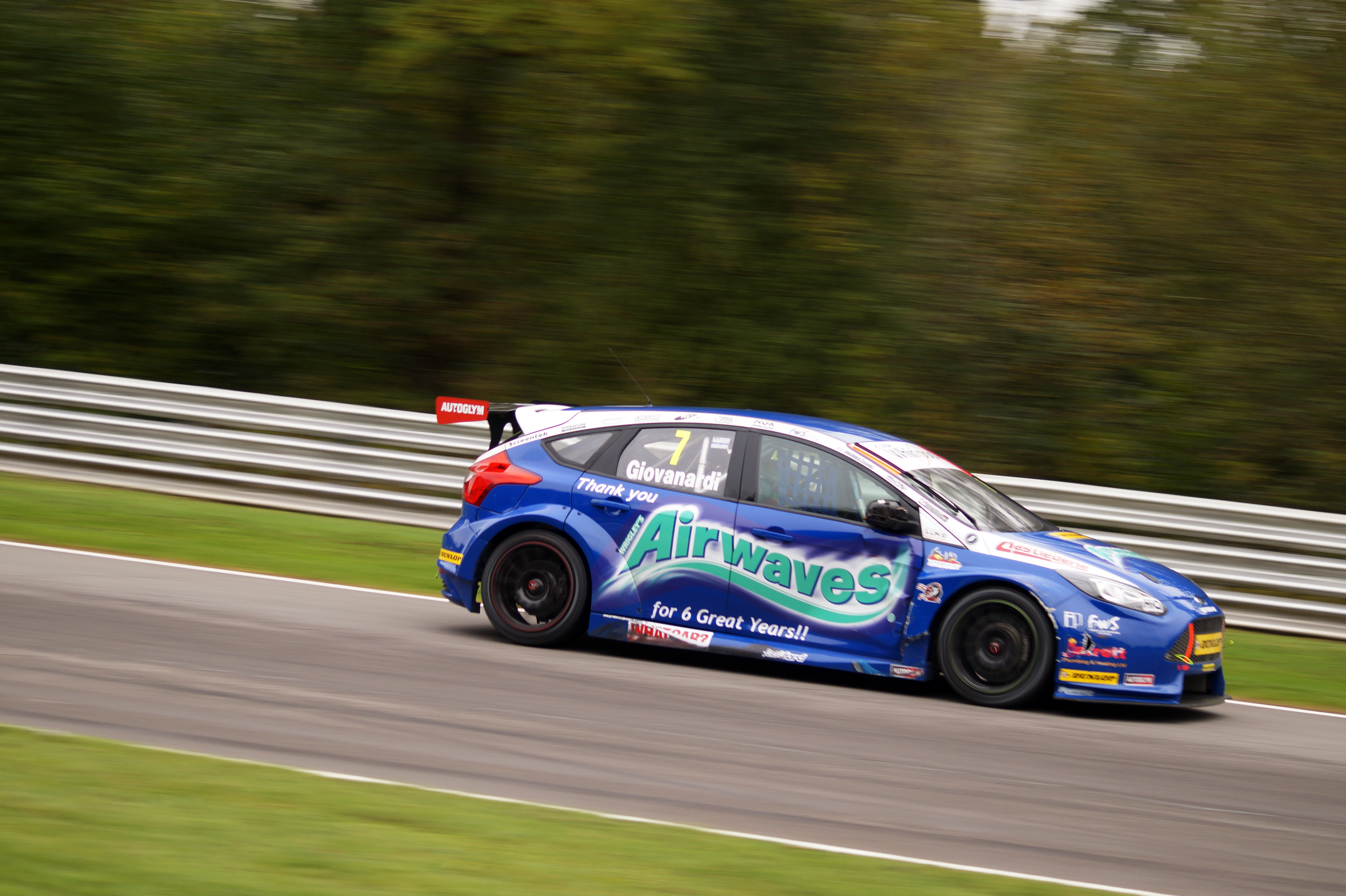
Giovanardi driving the Airwaves Racing Ford Focus ST at Brands Hatch during the 2014 British Touring Car Championship season.

==== Airwaves Racing (2014) ====
In February 2014, Giovanardi was confirmed as Airwaves Racing's first driver for the 2014 British Touring Car Championship season in a Ford Focus ST Mk.III. Giovanardi struggled to find the sweet spot in the new NGTC machinery and finished 13th overall with a solitary podium at Thruxton.

=== V8 Supercars ===
Giovanardi drove with Marc Hynes in the two main endurance races of the 2008 V8 Supercar Championship Series, the L&H 500 at Phillip Island and the Supercheap Auto Bathurst 1000 at Mount Panorama. The two drivers were recruited by Triple Eight Race Engineering to pilot the #88 car while regular drivers Jamie Whincup and Craig Lowndes teamed up in Lowndes' usual #888 car. At Phillip Island, Giovanardi and Hynes finished 17th, a lap down on winners Garth Tander and Mark Skaife and at Bathurst, the pair finished 15th – two laps down on team-mates (and race winners) Lowndes and Whincup. In 2010, Giovanardi drove for Britek Motorsport in the Armor All Gold Coast 600, sharing the team's Holden Commodore with Karl Reindler. In 2011, it was announced that Giovanardi would, once again, be driving for Britek Motorsport in the Armor All Gold Coast 600 with Karl Reindler.

Italian Touring Car Championship 2017 (Racing Return).

Giovanardi returned to Touring Car Racing for the first time in three years for a guest appearance in the Italian Touring Car Championship round at Vallelunga. He qualified sixth but after a poor start dropped back to tenth. Despite not racing in almost three years, Giovanardi fought his way back up to fourth in the race.

=== World Touring Car Cup (WTCR) ===
Giovanardi was confirmed as returning to regular touring car racing in 2018 at the wheel of an Alfa Romeo Giulietta in the FIA World Touring Car Cup.

== Racing record ==
=== Career summary ===
Season	Series	Team	Races	Wins	Poles	F/laps	Podiums	Points	Position
1987	Italian Formula 3 Championship	Prema Racing	11	0	0	0	1	6	13th
1988	Italian Formula 3 Championship	Prema Racing	12	2	1	3	7	46	**3rd**
1988	FIA European Formula 3 Cup	Prema Racing	1	0	0	0	0	N/A	6th
1988	Macau Grand Prix	Prema Racing	1	0	0	0	0	N/A	NC
1989	International Formula 3000	First Racing	6	1	0	0	1	9	10th
1989	IMSA GT Championship - GTP	De Blasi Racing	1	0	0	0	0	0	NC
1989	Renault 21 Turbo European Cup		?	0	?	0	0	2	22nd
1990	International Formula 3000	First Racing	11	0	0	0	1	10	10th
1990	Italian Formula 3 Championship		1	0	0	0	0	0	NC
1991	International Formula 3000	Forti Corse	8	0	0	0	0	6	11th
1991	Italian Superturismo Championship - S2		?	5	N/A	N/A	?	?	4th
1992	Italian Superturismo Championship - S2	Peugeot Italia	20	11	N/A	N/A	14	260.75	**1st**
1993	Italian Superturismo Championship	Peugeot Italia	20	5	4	7	12	226	**2nd**
1994	Italian Superturismo Championship	Peugeot Italia	20	0	0	1	7	156	**3rd**
1995	Italian Superturismo Championship	Nordauto Engineering	20	1	0	2	7	156	**3rd**
1995	Deutsche Tourenwagen Meisterschaft	Alfa Corse	1	0	0	0	0	0	NC
1996	Italian Superturismo Championship	Nordauto Engineering	20	2	1	4	7	175	5th
1996	Campeonato de España de Turismos	Nordauto Engineering	10	3	3	1	6	122	6th
1997	Italian Superturismo Championship	Alfa Romeo Nordauto	19	5	5	6	11	229	**2nd**
1997	Campeonato de España de Turismos	Alfa Romeo Nordauto	4	3	2	3	4	75	**1st**
1998	Italian Superturismo Championship	Nordauto	20	9	7	6	18	471	**1st**
1998	Super Tourenwagen Cup	Alfa Corse	2	0	0	0	0	28	25th
1999	Italian Superturismo Championship	Nordauto	19	7	2	6	13	401	**1st**
1999	Super Tourenwagen Cup	Alfa Corse	2	1	1	1	1	30	25th
2000	European Super Touring Cup	Alfa Romeo Team Nordauto	20	5	2	2	12	256	**1st**
2001	European Super Touring Championship	Alfa Romeo Team Nordauto	20	3	2	2	13	620	**1st**
2001	24 Hours of Sicily		1	0	0	0	1	N/A	**2nd**
2002	European Touring Car Championship	GTA Racing Team Nordauto	20	9	6	7	12	122	**1st**
2003	European Touring Car Championship	BMW Team Italy-Spain	20	0	0	0	3	43	9th
2004	European Touring Car Championship	AutoDelta Squadra Corse	18	1	1	2	5	63	5th
2005	World Touring Car Championship	Alfa Romeo Racing Team	19	4	2	4	8	81	**3rd**
2006	British Touring Car Championship	VX Racing	30	2	0	0	7	163	5th
2006	World Touring Car Championship	JAS Motorsport	3	0	0	0	0	8	20th
2006	TC 2000 Championship	Honda Petrobras Podium	1	0	0	0	0	0	NC
2007	British Touring Car Championship	VX Racing	30	10	1	3	17	300	**1st**
2008	British Touring Car Championship	VX Racing	29	5	0	9	15	262	**1st**
2008	V8 Supercar Championship Series	Triple Eight Race Engineering	3	0	0	0	0	222	45th
2009	British Touring Car Championship	VX Racing	30	5	1	5	15	266	**3rd**
2010	British Touring Car Championship	Uniq Racing with 888	3	2	0	0	2	38	14th
2010	Italian Superstars Championship	N.Technology	6	4	3	3	5	100	6th
2010	International Superstars Series	N.Technology	6	4	3	3	5	77	5th
2010	V8 Supercar Championship Series	Britek Motorsport	2	0	0	0	0	0	NC
2011	European Touring Car Cup	Hartmann Honda Racing	2	1	1	0	2	21	**1st**
2011	Italian GT Championship - GT Cup	AB Motorsport	2	1	0	0	1	19	23rd
2011	V8 Supercar Championship Series	Britek Motorsport	2	0	0	0	0	39	82nd
2011	Scandinavian Touring Car Championship	Hartmann Racing	2	1	0	0	1	29	16th
2011	24 Hours of Nürburgring - E1-XP2	Scuderia Cameron Glickenhaus	1	0	0	0	1	N/A	**2nd**
2012	24 Hours of Nürburgring - E1-XP	Global Partner Enterprise SA	1	1	?	?	1	N/A	**1st**
2013	International Superstars Series	Petri Corse	8	0	0	0	0	33	12th
2014	British Touring Car Championship	Airwaves Racing	30	0	0	0	1	138	13th
2017	TCR Italy Touring Car Championship	BF Motorsport	2	0	0	0	0	11	20th
2018	World Touring Car Cup	Team Mulsanne	23	0	0	0	0	19	24th
2018	TCR Europe Touring Car Series	Team Mulsanne	2	0	0	0	0	10	22nd

=== Complete International Formula 3000 results ===
(key) (Races in bold indicate pole position) (Races in italics indicate fastest lap)

Year	Entrant	Chassis	Engine	Tyres	1	2	3	4	5	6	7	8	9	10	11	DC	Points
1989	First Racing	March 89B	Judd	A	SIL; DNQ	VAL; 1										10th	9
1989	First Racing	Reynard 89D	Judd	A			PAU; Ret	JER; 14	PER; Ret	BRH; DNQ	BIR; DNS	SPA; 13	BUG; DNQ	DIJ; 12		10th	9
1990	First Racing	Reynard 90D	Mugen-Honda	A	DON; Ret	SIL; Ret	PAU; 2	JER; 6	MNZ; 10	PER; 6	HOC; 7	BRH; Ret	BIR; 5	BUG; Ret	NOG; Ret	10th	10
1991	Forti Corse	Lola T91/50	Ford Cosworth	A	VAL; 12	PAU; 5	JER; DNQ									11th	6
1991	Forti Corse	Reynard 91D	Ford Cosworth	A				MUG; 8	PER; Ret	HOC; 13	BRH; 8	SPA; 6	BUG; DNS	NOG; 4		11th	6

=== Complete Deutsche Tourenwagen Meisterschaft results ===
(key) (Races in bold indicate pole position) (Races in italics indicate fastest lap)

Year	Team	Car	1	2	3	4	5	6	7	8	9	10	11	12	13	14	Pos.	Pts
1995	Alfa Corse 2	Alfa Romeo 155 V6 Ti	HOC; 1	HOC; 2	AVU; 1	AVU; 2	NOR; 1 Ret	NOR; 2 DNS	DIE; 1	DIE; 2	NÜR; 1	NÜR; 2	ALE; 1	ALE; 2	HOC; 1	HOC; 2	NC	0

=== Complete Campeonato de España de Turismos ===
(key) (Races in bold indicate pole position) (Races in italics indicate fastest lap)

Year	Team	Car	1	2	3	4	5	6	7	8	9	10	11	12	13	14	15	16	Pos.	Pts
1996	Nordauto Engineering	Alfa Romeo 155 TS	JAR; 1	JAR; 2	ALB; 1	ALB; 2	BAR; 1; 2	BAR; 2; 1	EST; 1	EST; 2	CAL; 1; 3	CAL; 2; 6	JER; 1; 2	JER; 2; 1	JAR; 1; 9	JAR; 2; 6	BAR; 1; 1	BAR; 2 Ret	6th	122
1997	Nordauto Engineering	Alfa Romeo 155 TS	BAR; 1; 2	BAR; 2; 1	ALC; 1; 1	ALC; 2; 1	ALB; 1	ALB; 2	JAR; 1	JAR; 2	BAR; 1	BAR; 2							1st	75

=== Complete Italian Superturismo Championship results ===
Year	Team	Car	Class	1	2	3	4	5	6	7	8	9	10	11	12	13	14	15	16	17	18	19	20	DC	Pts
1992	Peugeot Talbot Sport	Peugeot 405	S2	MNZ; 1; 1	MNZ; 2 DSQ	MAG; 1; 1	MAG; 2; 1	MUG; 1; 1	MUG; 2; 1	BIN; 1; 2	BIN; 2; 1	VAL; 1; 1	VAL; 2; 2	IMO; 1; 1	IMO; 2; 1	MIS; 1; 1	MIS; 2; 1	PER; 1; 1	PER; 2 Ret	VAR; 1; 9	VAR; 2 Ret	MNZ; 1	MNZ; 2	1st	260
1993	Peugeot Talbot Sport	Peugeot 405		MNZ; 1; 10	MNZ; 2; 4	**VAL**; **1**; 11	VAL; 2; 7	MIS; 1; 2	MIS; 2 DSQ	MAG; 1; 6	MAG; 2; 13	**BIN**; **1**; 1	BIN; 2; 2	**IMO**; **1**; 1	IMO; 2; 3	VAR; 1; 3	VAR; 2; 1	**MIS**; **1**; 6	MIS; 2; 1	PER; 1; 2	PER; 2; 2	**MUG**; **1**; 2	**MUG**; **2**; 1	2nd	230
1994	Peugeot Talbot Sport	Peugeot 405 Mi 16		MNZ; 1; 8	MNZ; 2; 11	VAL; 1; 2	VAL; 2; 8	MAG; 1; 7	MAG; 2; 3	BIN; 1; 2	BIN; 2; 3	MIS; 1; 5	MIS; 2; 5	VAL; 1; 6	VAL; 2; 5	MUG; 1; 6	MUG; 2 Ret	PER; 1; 3	PER; 2; 6	VAR; 1; 3	VAR; 2; 6	MUG; 1; 2	MUG; 2; 4	3rd	156
1995	Nordauto Engineering	Alfa Romeo 155 TS		MIS; 1 Ret	MIS; 2; 5	BIN; 1; 4	BIN; 2; 4	MNZ; 1; 6	MNZ; 2; 14	IMO; 1; 5	IMO; 2 Ret	MAG; 1; 6	MAG; 2; 6	MUG; 1; 1	**MUG**; **2**; 2	MIS; 1; 5	MIS; 2; 7	PER; 1; 2	PER; 2; 2	VAR; 1; 3	VAR; 2; 2	VAL; 1; 2	VAL; 2; 7	3rd	179
1996	Nordauto Engineering	Alfa Romeo 155 TS		MUG; 1; 1	**MUG**; **2**; 1	MAG; 1; 3	MAG; 2; 3	MNZ; 1; 3	MNZ; 2; 4	BIN; 1; 5	BIN; 2; 7	MIS; 1; 5	MIS; 2; 11	IMO; 1; 5	IMO; 2; 4	PER; 1; 2	PER; 2; 2	**PER**; **1** Ret	PER; 2; 5	VAR; 1; 5	VAR; 2; 6	VAL; 1 Ret	VAL; 2; 8	5th	175
1997	Nordauto Engineering	Alfa Romeo 155 TS		MNZ; 1 Ret	MNZ; 2 DNS	**MUG**; **1**; 5	MUG; 2; 1	MAG; 1 Ret	MAG; 2; 5	**IMO**; **1**; 1	IMO; 2 Ret	IMO; 1; 8	IMO; 2; 2	BIN; 1; 4	BIN; 2; 4	**PER**; **1**; 1	PER; 2; 1	VAR; 1; 2	VAR; 2; 2	**MIS**; **1**; 2	MIS; 2; 2	**VAL**; **1**; 1	VAL; 2; 2	2nd	229
1998	Nordauto Engineering	Alfa Romeo 156		BIN; 1; 3	BIN; 2; 2	**IMO**; **1**; 1	IMO; 2; 3	**MNZ**; **1**; 3	MNZ; 2; 1	**VAR**; **1**; 5	VAR; 2; 2	**VAL**; **1**; 2	VAL; 2 DSQ	**MAG**; **1**; 1	MAG; 2; 2	**PER**; **1**; 1	**PER**; **2**; 1	MIS; 1; 1	**MIS**; **2**; 1	**MNZ**; **1**; 1	**MNZ**; **2**; 1	VAL; 1; 3	VAL; 2; 3	1st	471
1999	Nordauto Engineering	Alfa Romeo 156		MIS; 1; 4	MIS; 2; 2	BIN; 1; 3	BIN; 2; 4	IMO; 1; 2	IMO; 2; 3	**PER**; **1**; 1	**PER**; **2**; 1	**MAG**; **1**; 5	MAG; 2 DNS	**MUG**; **1**; 1	**MUG**; **2**; 1	**MIS**; **1**; 4	MIS; 2; 2	**VAR**; **1** Ret	VAR; 2 Ret	**MNZ**; **1**; 1	**MNZ**; **2**; 1	**VAL**; **1**; 2	VAL; 2; 1	1st	401

=== Complete European Touring Car Championship results ===
(key) (Races in bold indicate pole position) (Races in italics indicate fastest lap)

Year	Team	Car	1	2	3	4	5	6	7	8	9	10	11	12	13	14	15	16	17	18	19	20	DC	Pts
2000	Nordauto Engineering	Alfa Romeo 156	MUG; 1; 4	MUG; 2; 3	**PER**; **1**; 1	**PER**; **2**; 1	A1R; 1; 2	A1R; 2; 1	MNZ; 1; 5	MNZ; 2; 7	**HUN**; **1**; 2	HUN; 2; 3	IMO; 1; 2	IMO; 2; 2	MIS; 1; 4	MIS; 2; 4	BRN; 1; 2	BRN; 2; 7	VAL; 1; 1	**VAL**; **2**; 1	MOB; 1; 4	MOB; 2; 10	**1st**	**256**
2001	Alfa Romeo Nordauto Engineering	Alfa Romeo 156	MNZ; 1; 2	MNZ; 2; 4	**BRN**; **1**; 2	BRN; 2; 1	MAG; 1; 4	MAG; 2 Ret	SIL; 1; 2	SIL; 2; 2	ZOL; 1; 4	ZOL; 2; 1	**HUN**; **1**; 1	HUN; 2; 3	A1R; 1; 2	A1R; 2; 3	NÜR; 1; 17	**NÜR**; **2**; 4	JAR; 1; 3	JAR; 2; 2	EST; 1; 3	EST; 2; 5	**1st**	**620**
2002	GTA Racing Team Nordauto	Alfa Romeo 156 GTA	**MAG**; **1**; 1	MAG; 2; 1	**SIL**; **1**; 2	SIL; 2; 1	**BRN**; **1**; 1	BRN; 2; 1	**JAR**; **1**; 1	JAR; 2; 2	AND; 1; 2	AND; 2; 4	OSC; 1; 4	OSC; 2; 11	SPA; 1; 5	SPA; 2; 11†	**PER**; **1**; 1	PER; 2; 1	DON; 1; 4	DON; 2; 4	EST; 1; 1	EST; 2 Ret	**1st**	**122**
2003	BMW Team Italy-Spain	BMW 320i	VAL; 1; 2	VAL; 2; 5	MAG; 1 Ret	MAG; 2; 7	PER; 1; 10	PER; 2; 10	BRN; 1; 3	BRN; 2; 2	DON; 1; 11	DON; 2; 18†	SPA; 1; 5	SPA; 2; 16†	AND; 1; 10	AND; 2; 6	OSC; 1; 8	**OSC**; **2** Ret	EST; 1; 10	EST; 2; 12	MNZ; 1; 6	MNZ; 2; 5	9th	43
2004	AutoDelta Squadra Corse	Alfa Romeo 156	MNZ; 1; 2	MNZ; 2 Ret	VAL; 1; 2	VAL; 2; 1	MAG; 1; 6	MAG; 2; 5	HOC; 1 Ret	HOC; 2 DNS	BRN; 1; 5	BRN; 2; 5	DON; 1; 4	DON; 2; 16	SPA; 1 Ret	SPA; 2 DNS	**IMO**; **1**; 2	IMO; 2; 2	OSC; 1; 17	OSC; 2; 8	DUB; 1 Ret	DUB; 2; 16†	5th	63

† — Did not finish the race, but was classified as he completed over 90% of the race distance.

=== Complete World Touring Car Championship results ===
(key) (Races in bold indicate pole position) (Races in italics indicate fastest lap)

Year	Team	Car	1	2	3	4	5	6	7	8	9	10	11	12	13	14	15	16	17	18	19	20	DC	Points
2005	Squadra Corse Alfa Romeo	Alfa Romeo 156	ITA; 1; 6	ITA; 2; 8	FRA; 1; 10	FRA; 2; 7	GBR; 1; 3	GBR; 2; 8	**SMR**; **1**; 1	SMR; 2; 3	**MEX**; **1**; 1	MEX; 2; 3	BEL; 1; 7	**BEL**; **2**; 1	GER; 1; 26†	GER; 2 Ret	TUR; 1; 1	TUR; 2; 6	ESP; 1; 6	ESP; 2; 2	MAC; 1; 19†	MAC; 2 DNS	**3rd**	**81**
2006	JAS Motorsport	Honda Accord Euro R	ITA; 1	ITA; 2	FRA; 1	FRA; 2	GBR; 1	GBR; 2	GER; 1	GER; 2	BRA; 1; 16	BRA; 2 DNS	MEX; 1	MEX; 2	CZE; 1	CZE; 2	TUR; 1	TUR; 2	ESP; 1	ESP; 2	MAC; 1; 4	MAC; 2; 6	20th	8

† — Did not finish the race, but was classified as he completed over 90% of the race distance.

=== Complete British Touring Car Championship results ===
(key) (Races in bold indicate pole position - 1 point awarded just in first race) (Races in italics indicate fastest lap - 1 point awarded all races) (* signifies that driver lead race for at least one lap - 1 point awarded all races)

Year	Team	Car	1	2	3	4	5	6	7	8	9	10	11	12	13	14	15	16	17	18	19	20	21	22	23	24	25	26	27	28	29	30	Pos	Pts
2006	VX Racing	Vauxhall Astra Sport Hatch	BRH; 1 Ret	BRH; 2; 8	BRH; 3; 6	MON; 1; 7	MON; 2 Ret	MON; 3; 5	OUL; 1; 5	OUL; 2; 2	OUL; 3; 9	THR; 1 Ret	THR; 2; 8	THR; 3; 12	CRO; 1; 6	CRO; 2 Ret	CRO; 3; 5	DON; 1; 3	DON; 2; 4*	DON; 3; 2	SNE; 1; 3	SNE; 2 Ret	SNE; 3 Ret	KNO; 1; 4	KNO; 2; 1*	KNO; 3; 6	BRH; 1; 6	BRH; 2; 5	BRH; 3; 1*	SIL; 1; 7	SIL; 2; 3	SIL; 3; 16	5th	163
2007	VX Racing	Vauxhall Vectra	BRH; 1; 10	BRH; 2; 7	**BRH**; **3**; 2	ROC; 1; 1*	**ROC**; **2**; 1*	ROC; 3; 5	**THR**; **1**; 1*	**THR**; **2**; 1*	THR; 3; 4	CRO; 1; 6	CRO; 2; 6	CRO; 3; 1*	OUL; 1; 2	OUL; 2; 2	OUL; 3 Ret	DON; 1; 8	DON; 2; 3	DON; 3; 11	SNE; 1; 5	SNE; 2; 1*	SNE; 3; 3	BRH; 1; 1*	**BRH**; **2**; 1*	BRH; 3; 4	KNO; 1; 6	KNO; 2; 3	KNO; 3; 5	THR; 1; 1*	**THR**; **2**; 1*	THR; 3; 2	**1st**	**300**
2008	VX Racing	Vauxhall Vectra	BRH; 1; 1*	**BRH**; **2**; 1*	BRH; 3; 6	ROC; 1; 5	ROC; 2; 2*	ROC; 3; 5	DON; 1; 8	DON; 2; 1*	DON; 3; 4	THR; 1; 3	THR; 2; 10*	THR; 3; 3	CRO; 1; 4	CRO; 2; 5	CRO; 3; 1*	SNE; 1; 7	SNE; 2; 3	SNE; 3; 3	OUL; 1; 3	OUL; 2; 2	OUL; 3; 6	KNO; 1; 2	KNO; 2; 2	KNO; 3; 5	SIL; 1; 5	SIL; 2; 1*	SIL; 3; 3	BRH; 1; 14	BRH; 2 DNS	BRH; 3; 11	**1st**	**262**
2009	VX Racing	Vauxhall Vectra	BRH; 1; 2	BRH; 2; 16	BRH; 3 Ret	**THR**; **1**; 1*	**THR**; **2**; 2*	THR; 3; 8	DON; 1; 8	DON; 2; 3	DON; 3; 5	OUL; 1; 4	OUL; 2; 2	OUL; 3; 6	CRO; 1; 5	CRO; 2; 5	CRO; 3; 1*	SNE; 1; 1*	**SNE**; **2**; 1*	SNE; 3; 2	KNO; 1; 6	KNO; 2; 1*	KNO; 3; 3	SIL; 1; 5	SIL; 2; 2	SIL; 3; 5	ROC; 1; 6	ROC; 2; 3	ROC; 3; 11	BRH; 1; 3	BRH; 2; 2	BRH; 3; 4	**3rd**	**266**
2010	Uniq Racing with Triple Eight	Vauxhall Vectra	THR; 1; 1*	**THR**; **2**; 1*	THR; 3; 5	ROC; 1	ROC; 2	ROC; 3	BRH; 1	BRH; 2	BRH; 3	OUL; 1	OUL; 2	OUL; 3	CRO; 1	CRO; 2	CRO; 3	SNE; 1	SNE; 2	SNE; 3	SIL; 1	SIL; 2	SIL; 3	KNO; 1	KNO; 2	KNO; 3	DON; 1	DON; 2	DON; 3	BRH; 1	BRH; 2	BRH; 3	14th	38
2014	Airwaves Racing	Ford Focus ST Mk.III	BRH; 1; 14	BRH; 2; 9	BRH; 3; 16	DON; 1; 7	DON; 2; 12	DON; 3; 22	THR; 1; 12	THR; 2; 10	**THR**; **3**; 3	OUL; 1; 11	OUL; 2; 21	OUL; 3; 10	CRO; 1; 12	CRO; 2; 9	CRO; 3 Ret	SNE; 1; 13	SNE; 2; 7	SNE; 3; 13	KNO; 1; 13	KNO; 2; 9	KNO; 3 Ret	ROC; 1; 7	ROC; 2; 11	ROC; 3; 13	SIL; 1; 12	SIL; 2; 7	**SIL**; **3**; 11	BRH; 1; 7	BRH; 2; 19	BRH; 3; 13	13th	138

^{*} Season still in progress.

=== Complete V8 Supercar Championship results ===
Year	Team	Car	1	2	3	4	5	6	7	8	9	10	11	12	13	14	15	16	17	18	19	20	21	22	23	24	25	26	27	28	Final pos	Points
2008	Triple Eight Race Engineering	Ford Falcon BF	ADE	ECK	HAM	PTH	SAN	HDV	QLD	WIN	PHI Q 14	PHI R 17	BAT; 15	SUR	BHR	SYM	OPK														45th	222
2010	Britek Motorsport	Holden Commodore VE	YMC; R1	YMC; R2	BHR; R3	BHR; R4	ADE; R5	ADE; R6	HAM; R7	HAM; R8	QLD; R9	QLD; R10	WIN; R11	WIN; R12	HDV; R13	HDV; R14	TOW; R15	TOW; R16	PHI; R17	BAT; R18	SUR; R19; 9	SUR; R20; Ret	SYM; R21	SYM; R22	SAN; R23	SAN; R24	SYD; R25	SYD; R26			NC	0 +
2011	Britek Motorsport	Holden Commodore VE	YMC; R1	YMC; R2	ADE; R3	ADE; R4	HAM; R5	HAM; R6	PER; R7	PER; R8	PER; R9	WIN; R10	WIN; R11	HDV; R12	HDV; R13	TOW; R14	TOW; R15	QLD; R16	QLD; R17	QLD; R18	PHI; R19	BAT; R20	SUR; R21; Ret	SUR; R22; 22	SYM; R23	SYM; R24	SAN; R25	SAN; R26	SYD; R27	SYD; R28	82nd	39

+ Not Eligible for points

==== Bathurst 1000 results ====
Year	Team	Car	Co-driver	Position	Laps
2008	Triple Eight Race Engineering	Ford Falcon BF	(United Kingdom) Marc Hynes	15th	159

=== Complete International Superstars Series results ===
(key) (Races in bold indicate pole position) (Races in italics indicate fastest lap)

Year	Team	Car	1	2	3	4	5	6	7	8	9	10	11	12	13	14	15	16	DC	Points
2010	N. Technology	Porsche Panamera S	MNZ; 1	MNZ; 2	IMO; 1	IMO; 2	ALG; 1	ALG; 2	HOC; 1	HOC; 2	**CPR**; **1**; 1	CPR; 2; 1	**VAL**; **1**; 1	VAL; 2; 3	KYA; 1	KYA; 2			5th	77
2013	Petri Corse	Porsche Panamera S	MNZ; 1	MNZ; 2	BRN; 1; 5	BRN; 2 Ret	SVK; 1; 4	SVK; 2; 14	ZOL; 1; 7	ZOL; 2; 8	ALG; 1 Ret	ALG; 2 Ret	DON; 1	DON; 2	IMO; 1	IMO; 2	VAL; 1	VAL; 2	12th	33

=== Complete World Touring Car Cup results ===
(key) (Races in bold indicate pole position) (Races in italics indicate fastest lap)

Year	Team	Car	1	2	3	4	5	6	7	8	9	10	11	12	13	14	15	16	17	18	19	20	21	22	23	24	25	26	27	28	29	30	DC	Points
2018	Team Mulsanne	Alfa Romeo Giulietta TCR	MAR; 1; 19	MAR; 2; 13	MAR; 3; 19†	HUN; 1; 23†	HUN; 2; 23	HUN; 3 Ret	GER; 1; 15	GER; 2 Ret	GER; 3; 14	NED; 1; 22†	NED; 2 Ret	NED; 3 DNS	POR; 1; 11	POR; 2; 11	POR; 3 Ret	SVK; 1; 5	SVK; 2; 14	SVK; 3; 7	CHN; 1; 18	CHN; 2; 13	CHN; 3 Ret	WUH; 1 Ret	WUH; 2; 16	WUH; 3 Ret	JPN; 1	JPN; 2	JPN; 3	MAC; 1	MAC; 2	MAC; 3	24th	19

^{†} Driver did not finish the race, but was classified as he completed over 90% of the race distance.

=== Complete TCR Europe Touring Car Series results ===
(key) (Races in bold indicate pole position) (Races in italics indicate fastest lap)

Year	Team	Car	1	2	3	4	5	6	7	8	9	10	11	12	13	14	DC	Points
2018	Team Mulsanne	Alfa Romeo Giulietta TCR	LEC; 1	LEC; 2	ZAN; 1	ZAN; 2	SPA; 1	SPA; 2	HUN; 1	HUN; 2	ASS; 1	ASS; 2	MNZ; 1; 7	MNZ; 2; 8	CAT; 1	CAT; 2	22nd	10

== Personal life ==
Giovanardi is married to Patrizia and has one son, Luca. Away from racing he works for his father's business and has a passion for house renovation and flying light aircraft.

Sporting positions
Preceded by Jordi Gené	Spanish Touring Car Champion; 1997	Succeeded by Alfredo Mostajo
Preceded by Emanuele Naspetti	Italian Touring Car Champion; 1998–1999	Succeeded by Salvatore Tavano (2003)
Preceded by Roberto Ravaglia (1988)	European Touring Car Champion; 2000–2001–2002	Succeeded by Gabriele Tarquini
Preceded by Sandro Sardelli	European Touring Car Championship; Independents' Trophy winner 2002	Succeeded by Duncan Huisman
Preceded by Matt Neal	British Touring Car Champion; 2007–2008	Succeeded by Colin Turkington
Preceded by James Thompson	European Touring Car Cup Champion; 2011	Succeeded by Fernando Monje
