= Aleksandar Tošić =

Serbian racing driver (born 1970)

Aleksandar Tosić (born 18 January 1970 in Belgrade, SFR Yugoslavia) is a Serbian racing driver, who has competed in the European Touring Car Cup. He is a former ETCC Super Production champion, having won the title for the first time in 2011.

== Career ==
In 2011, Tošić became the champion in ETCC Super Production. Due to the two race weekend in effect he was crowned after having won both.

In 2012, he was runner up in the category with two other wins, this time under the expanded six-race calendar.
