= 2016 Campeonato Nacional de Velocidade Turismos =

Championship

Seasons
- ← 2015 2017 →

The 2016 Campeonato Nacional de Velocidade Turismos is the second season of the TCR Portuguese Series. Starting from this season, the championship will run separate from the GT Class of the championship (that will form che Endurance Class) organised by FullEventos. As for the Italian series, TCR cars will be placed side by side with TCS, also with the addition of a trophy cars category (TCC class).

== Teams and drivers ==
Hankook is the official tyre supplier.

Team	Car	No.	Drivers	Rounds
TCR Class
(Spain) Baporo Motorsport	SEAT León Cup Racer	2	(Portugal) António Cabral	1–3, 5
(Spain) Baporo Motorsport	SEAT León Cup Racer	2	(Portugal) José Cabral	1–3, 5
(Italy) Target Competition	Honda Civic TCR	3	(Austria) Jürgen Schmarl	5
(Italy) Target Competition	Honda Civic TCR	3	(Poland) Gosia Rdest	5
(Portugal) Team Novadriver	Volkswagen Golf GTI TCR	11	(Portugal) Francisco Abreu	All
(Portugal) Team Novadriver	Volkswagen Golf GTI TCR	11	(Portugal) Manuel Gião	All
(Portugal) Veloso Motorsport	SEAT León Cup Racer	16	(Portugal) Nuno Batista	All
(Portugal) Veloso Motorsport	SEAT León Cup Racer	16	(Portugal) Francisco Carvalho	All
(Portugal) Veloso Motorsport	SEAT León TCR	26	(Portugal) Francisco Mora	All
(Belgium) DG Sport Compétition	Opel Astra TCR	23	(Belgium) Pierre-Yves Corthals	4
(Belgium) DG Sport Compétition	Opel Astra TCR	23	(Belgium) Frédéric Caprasse	4
(Portugal) Ventilações Moura Laser	SEAT León Cup Racer	24	(Portugal) João Baptista	1
(Portugal) Ventilações Moura Laser	SEAT León Cup Racer	24	(Portugal) Gustavo Moura	1, 4
(Portugal) Ventilações Moura Laser	Opel Astra TCR	24	(Portugal) João Baptista	2
(Portugal) Ventilações Moura Laser	Opel Astra TCR	24	(Portugal) Gustavo Moura	2
(Portugal) Ventilações Moura Laser	Honda Civic TCR	24	(Portugal) Gustavo Moura	5
(Portugal) Speedy Motorsport	SEAT León Cup Racer	25	(Portugal) Rafael Lobato	All
(Portugal) Speedy Motorsport	SEAT León Cup Racer	25	(Portugal) César Machado	All
(Portugal) GEN Motorsport	Honda Civic TCR	27	(Portugal) José Rodrigues	All
(Finland) LMS Racing	SEAT León TCR	28	(Finland) Antti Buri	4
TCC Class
(Portugal) Tiago Ribeiro	Volkswagen Golf	31	(Portugal) Luís Carneiro	All
(Portugal) Tiago Ribeiro	Volkswagen Golf	31	(Portugal) Tiago Ribeiro	All
(Portugal) Vettra Motorsport	SEAT León Supercopa	44	(Portugal) Rui Dinis	1–3
(Portugal) Vettra Motorsport	SEAT León Supercopa	44	(Portugal) Paulo Ribeiro	1
(Portugal) Vettra Motorsport	SEAT León Supercopa	44	(Portugal) Valter Dinis	2–3
(Portugal) JCGroup Racing Team	SEAT León Mk2	50	(Portugal) José Correia	1
(Portugal) JCGroup Racing Team	SEAT León Mk2	50	(Portugal) Ricardo Gomes	1

Ineligible for points

== Calendar and results ==
The 2016 schedule was announced on 3 December 2015, with one out of five events scheduled to be held in Spain. A reserve round was scheduled at Autódromo do Estoril for 27 November. The race format is divided into Sprint and Double Sprint: the first one contemplates two 25-minute-long races, the second one is formed by four 20-minute-long races. By early April, the Estoril round was moved from 17–18 September to the reserve date.

Rnd.		Circuit	Date	Pole position	Fastest lap	Winning driver	Winning team	Supporting
1	1	(Portugal) Circuito Vasco Sameiro, Braga	14 May	(Portugal) Manuel Gião	(Portugal) Francisco Mora	(Portugal) Francisco Carvalho	(Portugal) Veloso Motorsport	
1	2	(Portugal) Circuito Vasco Sameiro, Braga	14 May		(Portugal) César Machado	(Portugal) Nuno Batista	(Portugal) Veloso Motorsport	
1	3	(Portugal) Circuito Vasco Sameiro, Braga	15 May	(Portugal) Francisco Mora	(Portugal) Francisco Mora	(Portugal) Nuno Batista	(Portugal) Veloso Motorsport	
1	4	(Portugal) Circuito Vasco Sameiro, Braga	15 May		(Portugal) Francisco Mora	(Portugal) Francisco Carvalho	(Portugal) Veloso Motorsport	
2	5	(Portugal) Circuito Internacional de Vila Real, Vila Real	26 June	(Portugal) Rafael Lobato	(Portugal) Francisco Mora	(Portugal) Rafael Lobato	(Portugal) Speedy Motorsport	FIA WTCC Race of Portugal; European Touring Car Cup
2	6	(Portugal) Circuito Internacional de Vila Real, Vila Real	26 June	(Portugal) José Rodrigues	(Portugal) José Rodrigues	(Portugal) José Rodrigues	(Portugal) GEN Motorsport	FIA WTCC Race of Portugal; European Touring Car Cup
3	7	(Portugal) Algarve International Circuit, Portimão	9 July	(Portugal) Francisco Mora	(Portugal) Francisco Mora	(Portugal) Francisco Mora	(Portugal) Veloso Motorsport	Spanish F4 Championship
3	8	(Portugal) Algarve International Circuit, Portimão	9 July		(Portugal) José Rodrigues	(Portugal) Francisco Mora	(Portugal) Veloso Motorsport	Spanish F4 Championship
3	9	(Portugal) Algarve International Circuit, Portimão	10 July	(Portugal) Francisco Mora	(Portugal) José Rodrigues	(Portugal) Francisco Mora	(Portugal) Veloso Motorsport	Spanish F4 Championship
3	10	(Portugal) Algarve International Circuit, Portimão	10 July		(Portugal) Manuel Gião	(Portugal) Francisco Mora	(Portugal) Veloso Motorsport	Spanish F4 Championship
4	11	(Spain) Circuito de Jerez, Jerez de la Frontera	11 September	(Portugal) Francisco Mora	(Portugal) Francisco Mora	(Belgium) Pierre-Yves Corthals	(Belgium) DG Sport Compétition	TCR Trophy Europe
4	12	(Spain) Circuito de Jerez, Jerez de la Frontera	11 September	(Finland) Antti Buri	(Finland) Antti Buri	(Finland) Antti Buri	(Finland) LMS Racing	TCR Trophy Europe
5	13	(Portugal) Autódromo do Estoril, Estoril	26 November	(Portugal) Rafael Lobato	(Portugal) Francisco Mora	(Portugal) Francisco Mora	(Portugal) Veloso Motorsport	
5	14	(Portugal) Autódromo do Estoril, Estoril	26 November		(Portugal) Francisco Mora	(Portugal) Gustavo Moura	(Portugal) Ventilações Moura Laser	
5	15	(Portugal) Autódromo do Estoril, Estoril	27 November	(Portugal) Francisco Mora	(Portugal) Francisco Mora	(Portugal) Francisco Mora	(Portugal) Veloso Motorsport	
5	16	(Portugal) Autódromo do Estoril, Estoril	27 November		(Portugal) Francisco Mora	(Portugal) Francisco Mora	(Portugal) Veloso Motorsport	

== Championship standings ==
=== Drivers' Championship ===
Pos.	Driver	BRA (Portugal)				VIL (Portugal)		POR (Portugal)				JER (Spain)		EST (Portugal)				Pts.
Pos.	Driver	RD1	RD2	RD3	RD4	RD1	RD2	RD1	RD2	RD3	RD4	RD1	RD2	RD1	RD2	RD3	RD4	Pts.
TCR class
1	(Portugal) Francisco Mora	3	Ret	**6**	**8**	2	DNS	**1**	**1**	**1**	**1**	**2**	Ret	1	3	**1**	1	299
2	(Portugal) Francisco Abreu (Portugal) Manuel Gião	**2**	**2**	5	3	3	2	8	DNS	4	2	5	3	4	5	2	2	252
3	(Portugal) Rafael Lobato (Portugal) César Machado	5	7	4	2	**1**	3	3	3	5	3	3	7	**2**	4	5	3	244
4	(Portugal) Francisco Carvalho (Portugal) Nuno Batista	1	1	1	1	5	DNS	4	2	3	4	7	4	8	Ret	NC	DNS	221
5	(Portugal) José Rodrigues	9	5	2	4	4	**1**	2	4	2	5	6	5	6	6	3	8	220
6	(Portugal) António Cabral (Portugal) José Cabral	6	3	3	5	6	4	5	5	6	6			5	7	7	5	168
7	(Portugal) Gustavo Moura	4	4	8	DNS	9	5					8	6	3	1	6	4	145
8	(Portugal) João Baptista	4	4	8	DNS	9	5											50
Guest drivers ineligible for points
-	(Belgium) Pierre-Yves Corthals (Belgium) Frédéric Caprasse											1	2					-
-	(Finland) Antti Buri											4	**1**					-
-	(Austria) Jürgen Schmarl (Poland) Gosia Rdest													Ret	2	4	6	-
TCC class
1	(Portugal) Luís Carneiro (Portugal) Tiago Ribeiro	7	9	**9**	**6**	**7**	**6**	7	7	**7**	**8**	**9**	**8**	**7**	8	**8**	7	365
2	(Portugal) Rui Dinis	**DNS**	**DNS**	DNS	DNS	8	Ret	**6**	**6**	8	7							118
3	(Portugal) Valter Dinis					8	Ret	**6**	**6**	8	7							116
4	(Portugal) José Correia (Portugal) Ricardo Gomes	8	8	7	7													92
5	(Portugal) Paulo Ribeiro	**DNS**	**DNS**	DNS	DNS													2
Pos.	Driver	BRA (Portugal)				VIL (Portugal)		POR (Portugal)				JER (Spain)		EST (Portugal)				Pts.

Colour	Result
Gold	Winner
Silver	Second place
Bronze	Third place
Green	Points classification
Blue	Non-points classification
Blue	Non-classified finish (NC)
Purple	Retired, not classified (Ret)
Red	Did not qualify (DNQ)
Red	Did not pre-qualify (DNPQ)
Black	Disqualified (DSQ)
White	Did not start (DNS)
White	Withdrew (WD)
White	Race cancelled (C)
Blank	Did not practice (DNP)
Blank	Did not arrive (DNA)
Blank	Excluded (EX)

**Bold** – Pole
Italics – Fastest Lap

† – Drivers did not finish the race, but were classified as they completed over 75% of the race distance.
