= 2018 Campeonato Nacional de Velocidade Turismos =

The 2018 Campeonato Nacional de Velocidade Turismos is set to be the fourth season of Campeonato Nacional de Velocidade Turismos (en: Portuguese Touring Car Championship) that will run under the TCR regulations. The series is organised by the Federação Portuguesa de Automobilismo e Karting (FPAK) and Full Eventos under the Racing Weekend banner. Francisco Mora is the defending drivers' champion.

== Teams and drivers ==
Yokohama is the official tire supplier. All teams and drivers are Portuguese based

Team	Car	No.	Drivers	Rounds
Sports&You	Peugeot 308 TCR	6	Francisco Abreu	All
Sports&You	Peugeot 308 TCR	6	Rafael Lobato	All
CRM Motorsport	Kia Cee'd TCR	7	Manuel Gião	All
Team Novadriver	Volkswagen Golf GTI TCR	11	Armando Parente	All
Team Novadriver	Volkswagen Golf GTI TCR	11	José Cautela	1–2
Team Novadriver	Volkswagen Golf GTI TCR	11	Henrique Chaves	3
Speedy Motorsport	CUPRA Léon TCR	22	Pedro Salvador	All
Speedy Motorsport	Audi RS 3 LMS TCR	24	Gustavo Moura	1–2, 4
Speedy Motorsport	Audi RS 3 LMS TCR	24	Telmo Gomes	4
Veloso Motorsport	CUPRA Léon TCR	26	Francisco Mora	1
Veloso Motorsport	Audi RS 3 LMS TCR	33	Francisco Carvalho	All

== Calendar and results ==
The original version of the calendar, which included 5 stages, was changed on April 4 due to the need for teams of more time to prepare for participation in the new season. All events will be held in Portugal. For works in the Estoril circuit, the Federação Portuguesa de Automobilismo e Karting, together with the promoter of the event, opted for the change of the 4th stage for the Braga circuit.

Rnd.	Circuit	Date	Pole position	Fastest lap	Winning driver	Winning team	Supporting
1	Circuito Vasco Sameiro, Braga	26–27 May	Francisco Mora	Armando Parente	Armando Parente	Team Novadriver	
1	Circuito Vasco Sameiro, Braga	26–27 May	Rafael Lobato	Pedro Salvador	Pedro Salvador	Speedy Motorsport	
2	Circuito Internacional de Vila Real, Vila Real	23–24 June	Pedro Salvador	Pedro Salvador	Pedro Salvador	Speedy Motorsport	World Touring Car Cup
2	Circuito Internacional de Vila Real, Vila Real	23–24 June	Pedro Salvador	Pedro Salvador	Pedro Salvador	Speedy Motorsport	World Touring Car Cup
3	Circuito Vasco Sameiro, Braga	15–16 September	Pedro Salvador	Pedro Salvador	Pedro Salvador	Speedy Motorsport	
3	Circuito Vasco Sameiro, Braga	15–16 September	Pedro Salvador	Pedro Salvador	Pedro Salvador	Speedy Motorsport	
4	Algarve International Circuit, Portimão	27–28 October	Armando Parente		Armando Parente	Team Novadriver	European Le Mans Series
4	Algarve International Circuit, Portimão	27–28 October	Armando Parente		Armando Parente	Team Novadriver	European Le Mans Series

=== Drivers' standings ===
Pos.	Driver	SAM		VIL		EST		ALG		Pts.
Pos.	Driver	RD1	RD2	RD1	RD2	RD1	RD2	RD1	RD2	Pts.
1	Pedro Salvador	2	1	**1**	**1**	**1**	**1**	Ret	Ret	153
2	Francisco Abreu; Rafael Lobato	5	**2**	2	3	4	2	3	4	135
3	Armando Parente	1	5	3	Ret	3	5	**1**	**1**	134
4	Francisco Carvalho	3	4	4	2	2	3	2	Ret	123
5	Manuel Gião	6	Ret	5	4	5	4	4	2	106
6	Gustavo Moura	4	6	Ret	5			5	3	65
7	José Cautela	1	5	3	Ret					55
8	Henrique Chaves					3	5			29
9	Telmo Gomes							5	3	29
10	Francisco Mora	**Ret**	3							18
-	João Sousa					DNS	DNS			0
Pos	Driver	SAM		VIL		EST		ALG		Pts

Colour	Result
Gold	Winner
Silver	Second place
Bronze	Third place
Green	Points classification
Blue	Non-points classification
Blue	Non-classified finish (NC)
Purple	Retired, not classified (Ret)
Red	Did not qualify (DNQ)
Red	Did not pre-qualify (DNPQ)
Black	Disqualified (DSQ)
White	Did not start (DNS)
White	Withdrew (WD)
White	Race cancelled (C)
Blank	Did not practice (DNP)
Blank	Did not arrive (DNA)
Blank	Excluded (EX)

**Bold** – Pole
Italics – Fastest Lap
