= 2017 TCR Ibérico Touring Car Series =

Motor racing competition

The 2017 TCR Ibérico Touring Car Series season was the first season of the TCR Iberico Touring Car Series, a merger of the TCR Spain and TCR Portugal series. The championship started at Autódromo do Estoril in Portugal on 30 April and ended at Algarve International Circuit in Portugal on 22 October.

== Teams and drivers ==
Hankook was the official tyre supplier.

TCR
Team	Car	No.	Drivers	Rounds
(Portugal) Vettramotorsport	SEAT León Cup Racer	2	(Portugal) Manuel Gião	All
(Portugal) Vettramotorsport	SEAT León Cup Racer	2	(Portugal) Ricardo Gomes	1–3
(Portugal) Veloso Motorsport	SEAT León TCR	5	(Portugal) Eduardo Leitão	1–4
(Portugal) Veloso Motorsport	SEAT León TCR	5	(Portugal) Ricardo Leitão	1, 5
(Portugal) Veloso Motorsport	SEAT León TCR	5	(Portugal) João Carvalho	2–5
(Portugal) Veloso Motorsport	Audi RS 3 LMS TCR	8	(Portugal) Patrick Cunha	All
(Portugal) Veloso Motorsport	Audi RS 3 LMS TCR	8	(Portugal) Rafael Lobato	All
(Portugal) Veloso Motorsport	SEAT León TCR	26	(Portugal) Francisco Mora	All
(Portugal) CRM Motorsport	Kia Cee'd TCR	7	(Portugal) José Pedro Faria	1–4
(Portugal) CRM Motorsport	Kia Cee'd TCR	7	(Portugal) João Baptista	All
(Portugal) CRM Motorsport	Kia Cee'd TCR	7	(Portugal) Eduardo Leitão	5
(Spain) Baporo Motorsport	SEAT León Cup Racer	9	(Andorra) Amalia Vinyes	1–3
(Spain) Baporo Motorsport	SEAT León Cup Racer	27	(Portugal) Gustavo Moura	1–4
(Spain) Baporo Motorsport	SEAT León Cup Racer	27	(Spain) Faust Salom	1–3
(Portugal) Team Novadriver	Volkswagen Golf GTI TCR	11	(Portugal) Francisco Abreu	All
(Portugal) Speedy Motorsport	SEAT León TCR	13	(Portugal) Nuno Batista	1–3
(Portugal) Speedy Motorsport	SEAT León TCR	13	(Portugal) Edgar Florindo	All
(Portugal) Speedy Motorsport	SEAT León Cup Racer	22	(Portugal) César Machado	1–4
(Portugal) Speedy Motorsport	SEAT León Cup Racer	22	(Portugal) Manuel Pedro Fernandes	1–3
(Spain) PCR Sport	SEAT León Cup Racer	15	(Portugal) José Monroy	1
(Spain) PCR Sport	SEAT León Cup Racer	15	(Spain) Francesc Gutiérrez	1
(Spain) RC2 Junior Team	SEAT León Cup Racer	25	(Spain) Lluis Llobet	1
(Spain) RC2 Junior Team	SEAT León Cup Racer	25	(Spain) Max Llobet	1
TCR 2
(Portugal) João Sousa	SEAT León Mk2	31	(Portugal) João Sousa	2–4
(Portugal) João Sousa	SEAT León Mk2	31	(Portugal) Rita Graça	2–4
(Portugal) Francisco Marrão	SEAT León Mk2	32	(Portugal) Francisco Marrão	3

== Calendar and results ==
The 2017 schedule was announced on 8 November 2016, with four event in Portugal and three events in Spain. The Portuguese rounds will count towards the TCR Portugal standings, while the Spanish rounds will count towards the TCR Spain standings. An overall title will also be available.

Rnd.	Circuit	Date	Pole position	Fastest lap	Winning driver	Winning team	Supporting
1	(Portugal) Autódromo do Estoril, Estoril	29 April	(Portugal) Francisco Abreu	(Portugal) Francisco Abreu	(Portugal) Rafael Lobato	(Portugal) Veloso Motorsport	International GT Open; Euroformula Open Championship
1	(Portugal) Autódromo do Estoril, Estoril	30 April	(Portugal) Francisco Mora	(Portugal) Francisco Mora	(Portugal) Francisco Mora	(Portugal) Veloso Motorsport	International GT Open; Euroformula Open Championship
2	(Portugal) Algarve International Circuit, Portimão	11 June	(Portugal) Francisco Abreu	(Portugal) Francisco Abreu	(Portugal) Francisco Mora	(Portugal) Veloso Motorsport	
2	(Portugal) Algarve International Circuit, Portimão	11 June	(Portugal) Francisco Mora	(Portugal) Francisco Mora	(Portugal) Francisco Mora	(Portugal) Veloso Motorsport	
3	(Portugal) Circuito Internacional de Vila Real, Vila Real	9 July	(Portugal) Francisco Mora	(Portugal) Francisco Abreu	(Portugal) Francisco Mora	(Portugal) Veloso Motorsport	
3	(Portugal) Circuito Internacional de Vila Real, Vila Real	9 July	(Portugal) Francisco Abreu	(Portugal) Francisco Abreu	(Portugal) Francisco Abreu	(Portugal) Team Novadriver	
4	(Portugal) Circuito Vasco Sameiro, Braga	2 September	(Portugal) Rafael Lobato	(Portugal) Francisco Mora	(Portugal) Francisco Mora	(Portugal) Veloso Motorsport	
4	(Portugal) Circuito Vasco Sameiro, Braga	2 September		(Portugal) César Machado	(Portugal) Francisco Mora	(Portugal) Veloso Motorsport	
4	(Portugal) Circuito Vasco Sameiro, Braga	3 September	(Portugal) Francisco Mora	(Portugal) Francisco Mora	(Portugal) Francisco Mora	(Portugal) Veloso Motorsport	
4	(Portugal) Circuito Vasco Sameiro, Braga	3 September		(Portugal) Francisco Mora	(Portugal) Edgar Florindo	(Portugal) Speedy Motorsport	
-	(Spain) Circuit de Barcelona-Catalunya, Montmeló	16-17 September	Round canceled due to low number of entries				
5	(Portugal) Algarve International Circuit, Portimão	22 October	(Portugal) Francisco Abreu	(Portugal) Francisco Abreu	(Portugal) Francisco Abreu	(Portugal) Team Novadriver	European Le Mans Series
5	(Portugal) Algarve International Circuit, Portimão	22 October		(Portugal) Francisco Abreu	(Portugal) Francisco Abreu	(Portugal) Team Novadriver	European Le Mans Series
5	(Portugal) Algarve International Circuit, Portimão	22 October	(Portugal) Francisco Abreu	(Portugal) Francisco Abreu	(Portugal) Rafael Lobato	(Portugal) Veloso Motorsport	European Le Mans Series
5	(Portugal) Algarve International Circuit, Portimão	22 October		(Portugal) Francisco Abreu	(Portugal) Edgar Florindo	(Portugal) Speedy Motorsport	European Le Mans Series

TCR Portuguese Series only
TCR Spanish Series only
Both championships

== Championship standings ==
=== TCR Ibérico Touring Car Series ===
==== Drivers' championship ====
Scoring systems

Position	**1st**	**2nd**	**3rd**	**4th**	**5th**	**6th**	**7th**	**8th**	**9th**	**10th**	**11th**	**12th**	**13th**	**14th**	**15th**	PP	FL
Points	35	25	20	16	14	12	10	8	7	6	5	4	3	2	1	**1**	1

Pos.	Driver	EST (Portugal)		ALG (Portugal)		VIL (Portugal)		ALG (Portugal)				Pts.
Pos.	Driver	RD1	RD2	RD1	RD2	RD1	RD2	RD1	RD2	RD3	RD4	Pts.
1	(Portugal) Francisco Abreu	**2**	3	**2**	8†	3	**1**	**1**	1	**5**	2	164
2	(Portugal) Patrick Cunha (Portugal) Rafael Lobato	1	Ret	7	2	2	3	2	5	1	4	145
3	(Portugal) Francisco Mora	3	**1**	1	**1**	**1**	2	10†	DNS	DNS	DNS	120
4	(Portugal) Edgar Florindo	8	5	6	9†	11†	9	3	2	3	1	96
5	(Portugal) Manuel Gião	4	10	3	6	8†	DNS	9†	4	2	3	46
6	(Portugal) João Carvalho			5	3	6†	5	4	3	4	5	74
7	(Portugal) César Machado (Portugal) Manuel Pedro Fernandes	5	2	8	4	7†	4					57
8	(Portugal) Eduardo Leitão	9	9	5	3	6†	5	8	DNS	DNS	DNS	55
9	(Portugal) Ricardo Leitão	9	9					4	3	4	5	47
10	(Portugal) Ricardo Gomes	4	10	3	6	8†	DNS					46
11	(Portugal) Gustavo Moura	11	8	4	5	4	6					40
12	(Portugal) Nuno Batista	8	5	6	9†	11†	9					36
12	(Portugal) José Cautela							9†	4	2	3	36
13	(Portugal) João Baptista	10	Ret	DNS	DNS	10†	DNS	8	DNS	DNS	DNS	28
14	(Spain) Faust Salom	11	8	4	5	DNS	DNS					24
15	(Andorra) Amalia Vinyes	6	4	DNS	DNS	DNS	DNS					16
16	(Portugal) José Pedro Faria	10	Ret	DNS	DNS	10†	DNS					14
17	(Portugal) José Monroy (Spain) Francesc Gutiérrez	7	7									12
18	(Spain) Lluis Llobet (Spain) Max Llobet	12	6									12
Pos.	Driver	EST (Portugal)		ALG (Portugal)		VIL (Portugal)		ALG (Portugal)				Pts.

Colour	Result
Gold	Winner
Silver	Second place
Bronze	Third place
Green	Points classification
Blue	Non-points classification
Blue	Non-classified finish (NC)
Purple	Retired, not classified (Ret)
Red	Did not qualify (DNQ)
Red	Did not pre-qualify (DNPQ)
Black	Disqualified (DSQ)
White	Did not start (DNS)
White	Withdrew (WD)
White	Race cancelled (C)
Blank	Did not practice (DNP)
Blank	Did not arrive (DNA)
Blank	Excluded (EX)

**Bold** – Pole
Italics – Fastest Lap

† – Drivers did not finish the race, but were classified as they completed over 75% of the race distance.

==== Class 2 ====
Pos.	Driver	EST (Portugal)	ALG (Portugal)	VIL (Portugal)	BAR (Spain)	Pts.
1	(Portugal) Joao Sousa (Portugal) Rita Grasa		**1**	1	C	73
2	(Portugal) Francisco Marrao			**2**	C	26

=== TCR Portugal Touring Car Championship ===
==== Drivers' championship ====
Pos.	Driver	EST (Portugal)		ALG (Portugal)		VIL (Portugal)		BRA (Portugal)				ALG (Portugal)				Pts.
Pos.	Driver	RD1	RD2	RD1	RD2	RD1	RD2	RD1	RD2	RD3	RD4	RD1	RD2	RD3	RD4	Pts.
1	(Portugal) Francisco Mora	3	**1**	1	**1**	**1**	2	1	1	**1**	2	10†	DNS	DNS	DNS	251
2	(Portugal) Francisco Abreu	**2**	3	**2**	8†	3	**1**	4	5	4	4	**1**	1	**5**	2	224
3	(Portugal) Patrick Cunha (Portugal) Rafael Lobato	1	Ret	7	2	2	3	**8†**	4	3	3	2	5	1	4	206
4	(Portugal) Edgar Florindo	8	5	6	9†	11†	9	3	2	2	1	3	2	3	1	198
5	(Portugal) João Carvalho			5	3	6†	5	5	7	6	6	4	3	4	5	149
6	(Portugal) César Machado	5	2	8	4	7†	4	2	3	5	5					142
7	(Portugal) Eduardo Leitão	9		5	3	6†	5	5	7	6	6	8	DNS	DNS	DNS	123
8	(Portugal) Gustavo Moura	11	8	4	5	4	6	6	6	8	7					103
9	(Portugal) Manuel Pedro Fernandes	5	2	8	4	7†	4									80
10	(Portugal) Nuno Batista	8	5	6	9†	11†	9									56
11	(Spain) Faust Salom	11	8	4	5	DNS	DNS									43
12	(Portugal) João Baptista	10	Ret	DNS	DNS	10†	DNS	DNS	DNS	DNS	DNS	8	DNS	DNS	DNS	32
13	(Andorra) Amalia Vinyes	6	4	DNS	DNS	DNS	DNS									26
14	(Portugal) José Pedro Faria	10	Ret	DNS	DNS	10†	DNS	DNS	DNS	DNS	DNS					20
Pos.	Driver	EST (Portugal)		ALG (Portugal)		VIL (Portugal)		BRA (Portugal)				ALG (Portugal)				Pts.

Colour	Result
Gold	Winner
Silver	Second place
Bronze	Third place
Green	Points classification
Blue	Non-points classification
Blue	Non-classified finish (NC)
Purple	Retired, not classified (Ret)
Red	Did not qualify (DNQ)
Red	Did not pre-qualify (DNPQ)
Black	Disqualified (DSQ)
White	Did not start (DNS)
White	Withdrew (WD)
White	Race cancelled (C)
Blank	Did not practice (DNP)
Blank	Did not arrive (DNA)
Blank	Excluded (EX)

**Bold** – Pole
Italics – Fastest Lap

† – Drivers did not finish the race, but were classified as they completed over 75% of the race distance.

=== TCR Spain Touring Car Championship ===
==== Drivers' championship ====
Pos.	Driver	EST (Portugal)		ALG (Portugal)		VIL (Portugal)		BAR (Spain)		Pts.
Pos.	Driver	RD1	RD2	RD1	RD2	RD1	RD2	RD1	RD2	Pts.
1	(Portugal) Francisco Mora	3	**1**	1	**1**	**1**	2	C	C	113
2	(Portugal) Francisco Abreu	**2**	3	**2**	8†	3	**1**	C	C	96
3	(Portugal) Rafael Lobato	1			2	2		C	C	87
4	(Portugal) César Machado		2		4		4	C	C	57
5	(Portugal) Gustavo Moura		8		5	4	6	C	C	38
6	(Portugal) Manuel Gião	4		3			DNS	C	C	36
7	(Portugal) Eduardo Leitão	9		5			5	C	C	35
8	(Portugal) Manuel Pedro Fernandes	5		8		7†		C	C	34
8	(Portugal) João Carvalho				3	6†		C	C	34
8	(Portugal) Patrick Cunha		Ret	7			3	C	C	34
9	(Portugal) Nuno Batista		5		9†		11†	C	C	23
10	(Spain) Faust Salom	11		4		DNS	DNS	C	C	21
11	(Portugal) Edgar Florindo	8		6		9		C	C	20
12	(Portugal) Ricardo Gomes		10		6	8†		C	C	18
13	(Andorra) Amalia Vinyes	6	4	DNS	DNS	DNS	DNS	C	C	16
14	(Portugal) José Monroy	7						C	C	12
14	(Spain) Lluis Llobet		6					C	C	12
15	(Spain) Francesc Gutiérrez		7					C	C	10
16	(Portugal) Ricardo Leitão		9					C	C	7
17	(Portugal) José Pedro Faria	10		DNS		Ret		C	C	6
18	(Portugal) João Baptista		Ret		DNS		DNS	C	C	5
19	(Spain) Max Llobet	12						C	C	4
Pos.	Driver	EST (Portugal)		ALG (Portugal)		VIL (Portugal)		BAR (Spain)		Pts.

Colour	Result
Gold	Winner
Silver	Second place
Bronze	Third place
Green	Points classification
Blue	Non-points classification
Blue	Non-classified finish (NC)
Purple	Retired, not classified (Ret)
Red	Did not qualify (DNQ)
Red	Did not pre-qualify (DNPQ)
Black	Disqualified (DSQ)
White	Did not start (DNS)
White	Withdrew (WD)
White	Race cancelled (C)
Blank	Did not practice (DNP)
Blank	Did not arrive (DNA)
Blank	Excluded (EX)

**Bold** – Pole
Italics – Fastest Lap

† – Drivers did not finish the race, but were classified as they completed over 75% of the race distance.
