= 2019 TCR Series seasons =

2019 TCR Series

This article describes some of the 2019 seasons of TCR Series across the world.

== VLN TCR Class ==
The 2019 Veranstaltergemeinschaft Langstreckenpokal Nürburgring TCR Class was the third season for the TCR Class in the championship.

=== Teams and drivers ===
Team	Car	No.	Drivers	Rounds
(Germany) Max Kruse Racing	Volkswagen Golf GTI TCR	10	(Germany) Andreas Gülden	1–7
(Germany) Max Kruse Racing	Volkswagen Golf GTI TCR	10	(Germany) Benjamin Leuchter	1–7
(Germany) Max Kruse Racing	Volkswagen Golf GTI TCR	819	(Switzerland) Jasmin Priesig	4–9
(Germany) Max Kruse Racing	Volkswagen Golf GTI TCR	819	(Germany) Loris Prattes	4–7
(Germany) Max Kruse Racing	Volkswagen Golf GTI TCR	819	(Germany) Benjamin Leuchter	6, 8
(Germany) Max Kruse Racing	Volkswagen Golf GTI TCR	819	(Germany) Andreas Gülden	8
(Norway) Møller Bil Motorsport	Audi RS 3 LMS TCR	801	(Norway) Håkon Schjærin	3, 5–9
(Norway) Møller Bil Motorsport	Audi RS 3 LMS TCR	801	(Norway) Kenneth Østvold	3, 5–9
(Norway) Møller Bil Motorsport	Audi RS 3 LMS TCR	801	(Norway) Atle Gulbrandsen	3, 5, 9
(Norway) Møller Bil Motorsport	Audi RS 3 LMS TCR	801	(Norway) Anders Lindstad	5–8
(Germany) Mathilda Racing	CUPRA León TCR	804	(Germany) Karl Brinker	6–7
(Germany) Mathilda Racing	CUPRA León TCR	804	(Germany) Timo Hochwind	6–7
(Germany) Mathilda Racing	CUPRA León TCR	806	(Germany) Matthias Wasel	All
(Germany) Mathilda Racing	CUPRA León TCR	806	(Switzerland) Frederic Yerly	All
(Germany) Mathilda Racing	CUPRA León TCR	806	(Germany) Heiko Hammel	2–4
(Germany) Mathilda Racing	CUPRA León TCR	806	(Switzerland) Roland Schmid	5–8
(Germany) Mathilda Racing	CUPRA León TCR	806	(Switzerland) Mathias Schläppi	9
(Germany) FEV Racing	CUPRA León TCR	820	(Germany) Lukas Thiele	1–3
(Germany) FEV Racing	CUPRA León TCR	820	(Germany) Martin Pischinger	1
(Germany) FEV Racing	CUPRA León TCR	820	(Germany) Benedikt Gentken	2–3
(Germany) FEV Racing	CUPRA León TCR	820	(Germany) André Gies	3
(Germany) Lubner Motorsport	Opel Astra TCR	822	(Switzerland) Roger Vögeli	4
(Germany) Lubner Motorsport	Opel Astra TCR	822	(Finland) Ilkka Kariste	4
(Germany) Lubner Motorsport	Opel Astra TCR	822	(Russia) Andrei Sidorenko	4
(South Korea) Hyundai Motorsport N	Hyundai i30 N TCR	830	(Germany) Peter Terting	1–2
(South Korea) Hyundai Motorsport N	Hyundai i30 N TCR	830	(Austria) Harald Proczyk	1–2
(South Korea) Hyundai Motorsport N	Hyundai Veloster N TCR	833	(Germany) Manuel Lauck	1
(South Korea) Hyundai Motorsport N	Hyundai Veloster N TCR	833	(Germany) Marc Basseng	1
(South Korea) Hyundai Motorsport N	Hyundai Veloster N TCR	833	(Belgium) Nico Verdonck	2
(South Korea) Hyundai Motorsport N	Hyundai Veloster N TCR	833	(Germany) Moritz Oestreich	2
(Germany) Autohaus Markus Fugel e.K.	Honda Civic Type-R TCR (FK8)	835	(Portugal) Tiago Monteiro	1–2
(Germany) Autohaus Markus Fugel e.K.	Honda Civic Type-R TCR (FK8)	835	(Germany) Markus Oestreich	1–2
(Germany) Autohaus Markus Fugel e.K.	Honda Civic Type-R TCR (FK8)	835	(Germany) Dominik Fugel	1
(Switzerland) Garage Rothenberger GmbH	CUPRA León TCR	838	(Switzerland) Sandro Rothenberger	1–3
(Switzerland) Garage Rothenberger GmbH	CUPRA León TCR	838	(Germany) Karl Brinker	1–3

Some TCR cars come in other VLN classes.

=== Calendar and results ===
Rnd.	Event	Circuit	Date	Pole position	Fastest lap	Winning drivers	Winning team
1	65. ADAC Westfalenfahrt	Nürburgring Nordschleife	23 March	(Germany) Andreas Gülden (Germany) Benjamin Leuchter	(Germany) Peter Terting (Austria) Harald Proczyk	(Germany) Matthias Wasel (Switzerland) Frederic Yerly	(Germany) Mathilda Racing
2	44. DMV 4-Stunden-Rennen	Nürburgring Nordschleife	13 April	Canceled due to snowfall			
3	61. ADAC ACAS H&R-Cup	Nürburgring Nordschleife	27 April	(Germany) Andreas Gülden (Germany) Benjamin Leuchter	(Norway) Håkon Schjærin (Norway) Atle Gulbrandsen (Norway) Kenneth Østvold	(Germany) Matthias Wasel (Switzerland) Frederic Yerly (Germany) Heiko Hammel	(Germany) Mathilda Racing
4	50. Adenauer ADAC Rundstrecken-Trophy	Nürburgring Nordschleife	13 July	(Germany) Andreas Gülden (Germany) Benjamin Leuchter	(Germany) Andreas Gülden (Germany) Benjamin Leuchter	(Germany) Andreas Gülden (Germany) Benjamin Leuchter	(Germany) Max Kruse Racing
5	ROWE 6 Stunden ADAC Ruhr-Pokal-Rennen	Nürburgring Nordschleife	3 August	(Switzerland) Jasmin Priesig (Germany) Loris Prattes	(Germany) Matthias Wasel (Switzerland) Frederic Yerly (Switzerland) Roland Schmid	(Germany) Matthias Wasel (Switzerland) Frederic Yerly (Switzerland) Roland Schmid	(Germany) Mathilda Racing
6	42. RCM DMV Grenzlandrennen	Nürburgring Nordschleife	7 September	(Norway) Håkon Schjærin (Norway) Atle Gulbrandsen (Norway) Kenneth Østvold	(Germany) Andreas Gülden (Germany) Benjamin Leuchter	(Germany) Andreas Gülden (Germany) Benjamin Leuchter	(Germany) Max Kruse Racing
7	59. ADAC Reinoldus-Langstreckenrennen	Nürburgring Nordschleife	28 September	(Germany) Andreas Gülden (Germany) Benjamin Leuchter	(Switzerland) Jasmin Priesig (Germany) Loris Prattes (Germany) Benjamin Leuchter	(Germany) Matthias Wasel (Switzerland) Frederic Yerly (Switzerland) Roland Schmid	(Germany) Mathilda Racing
8	51. ADAC Barbarossapreis	Nürburgring Nordschleife	12 October	(Switzerland) Jasmin Priesig (Germany) Loris Prattes (Germany) Benjamin Leuchter	(Switzerland) Jasmin Priesig (Germany) Loris Prattes (Germany) Benjamin Leuchter	(Germany) Matthias Wasel (Switzerland) Frederic Yerly (Switzerland) Roland Schmid	(Germany) Mathilda Racing
9	44. DMV Münsterlandpokal	Nürburgring Nordschleife	26 October	(Germany) Andreas Gülden (Germany) Benjamin Leuchter	(Norway) Håkon Schjærin (Norway) Atle Gulbrandsen (Norway) Kenneth Østvold	(Norway) Håkon Schjærin (Norway) Atle Gulbrandsen (Norway) Kenneth Østvold	(Norway) Møller Bil Motorsport

== UAE Touring Car Championship ==
The 2018–19 UAE Touring Car Championship (also called NGK UAE Touring Car Championship for sponsorship reasons) is the 11th season of the UAE Touring Car Championship and the first that TCR class was featured.

=== Teams and drivers ===
All teams are UAE–registered.

Team	Car	No.	Drivers	Rounds
Gulf Petrochem / Mouhritsa Racing Team	CUPRA León TCR	9	(Greece) Costas Papantonis	1–3, 5–7

=== Calendar and results ===
All Rounds are held in the United Arab Emirates.

Rnd.		Circuit	Date	Pole position	Fastest lap	Winning driver	Winning team
2018
1	1	Yas Marina Circuit, Abu Dhabi	26 October	(Greece) Costas Papantonis	(Greece) Costas Papantonis	(Greece) Costas Papantonis	Gulf Petrochem / Mouhritsa Racing Team
1	2	Yas Marina Circuit, Abu Dhabi	26 October		(Greece) Costas Papantonis	(Greece) Costas Papantonis	Gulf Petrochem / Mouhritsa Racing Team
2	1	Dubai Autodrome, Dubai	16 November	(Greece) Costas Papantonis	(Greece) Costas Papantonis	(Greece) Costas Papantonis	Gulf Petrochem / Mouhritsa Racing Team
2	2	Dubai Autodrome, Dubai	16 November		(Greece) Costas Papantonis	(Greece) Costas Papantonis	Gulf Petrochem / Mouhritsa Racing Team
3	1	Dubai Autodrome, Dubai	7 December	(Greece) Costas Papantonis	(Greece) Costas Papantonis	No drivers finished	
3	2	Dubai Autodrome, Dubai	7 December		No drivers started		
2019
4	1	Yas Marina Circuit, Abu Dhabi	18 January	No drivers entered			
4	2	Yas Marina Circuit, Abu Dhabi	18 January	No drivers entered			
5	1	Dubai Autodrome, Dubai	15 February	(Greece) Costas Papantonis	(Greece) Costas Papantonis	(Greece) Costas Papantonis	Gulf Petrochem / Mouhritsa Racing Team
5	2	Dubai Autodrome, Dubai	15 February		(Greece) Costas Papantonis	(Greece) Costas Papantonis	Gulf Petrochem / Mouhritsa Racing Team
6	1	Dubai Autodrome, Dubai	1 March	(Greece) Costas Papantonis	(Greece) Costas Papantonis	(Greece) Costas Papantonis	Gulf Petrochem / Mouhritsa Racing Team
6	2	Dubai Autodrome, Dubai	1 March		(Greece) Costas Papantonis	(Greece) Costas Papantonis	Gulf Petrochem / Mouhritsa Racing Team
7	1	Dubai Autodrome, Dubai	22 March	(Greece) Costas Papantonis	(Greece) Costas Papantonis	(Greece) Costas Papantonis	Gulf Petrochem / Mouhritsa Racing Team
7	2	Dubai Autodrome, Dubai	22 March		(Greece) Costas Papantonis	(Greece) Costas Papantonis	Gulf Petrochem / Mouhritsa Racing Team

=== Championship standings ===
Pos.	Driver	YMC		DUB		DUB		YMC	DUB		DUB		DUB		Pts.
1	(Greece) Costas Papantonis	1	1	1	1	Ret	DNS		1	1	1	1	1	1	250
Pos.	Driver	YMC		DUB		DUB		YMC	DUB		DUB		DUB		Pts.

== TCR Baltic Trophy ==
The 2019 TCR Baltic Trophy will be the third season of TCR Baltic Trophy, which is contested within the Baltic Touring Car Championship events. There will be also a standalone endurance class, which is contested within the supporting NEZ Endurance Championship. The winner of TCR Baltic in 2019 was Džiugas Tovilavičius.

=== Teams and drivers ===
Team	Car	No.	Drivers	Rounds
(Finland) Emil Westman	CUPRA León TCR	4	(Finland) Emil Westman	2
(Lithuania) GSR Motorsport	Volkswagen Golf GTI TCR	5	(Lithuania) Ernesta Globytė	1
(Lithuania) GSR Motorsport	Volkswagen Golf GTI TCR	99	(Lithuania) Julius Adomavičius	2−3, 5
(Lithuania) Neste Dream 2 Drive PRO	CUPRA León TCR	99	(Lithuania) Julius Adomavičius	1, 4
(Lithuania) DHL Racing Team	CUPRA León TCR	12	(Lithuania) Jurgis Adomavičius	3
(Lithuania) DHL Racing Team	CUPRA León TCR	15	(Lithuania) Ramūnas Čapkauskas	1−2, 4−5
(Lithuania) DHL Racing Team	Hyundai i30 N TCR	15	(Lithuania) Ramūnas Čapkauskas	3
(Estonia) ALM Motorsport	Honda Civic Type R TCR (FK8)	23	(Estonia) Mattias Vahtel	1−2
(Estonia) ALM Motorsport	Honda Civic Type R TCR (FK8)	44	(Estonia) Robin Vaks	1−2
(Estonia) ALM Motorsport	Honda Civic Type R TCR (FK2)	34	(Estonia) Peeter Peek	1, 3−5
(Lithuania) Mv Sport	Hyundai i30 N TCR	33	(Lithuania) Egidijus Valeiša	1
(Russia) Andrey Yushin	CUPRA León TCR	38	(Russia) Andrey Yushin	All
(Russia) Carville Racing	Volkswagen Golf GTI TCR	91	(Russia) Grigoriy Burlutskiy	5
(Lithuania) Energizer Racing	Volkswagen Golf GTI TCR	95	(Lithuania) Rokas Kvedaras	1
(Lithuania) Noker Racing Team	Volkswagen Golf GTI TCR	911	(Lithuania) Kęstutis Stasionis	1−3, 5
(Lithuania) SKUBA Racing Team	Volkswagen Golf GTI TCR	912	(Lithuania) Džiugas Tovilavičius	All

=== Calendar and results ===
Rnd.		Circuit	Date	Pole position	Fastest lap	Winning driver	Winning team
1	1	(Latvia) Biķernieki Complex Sports Base, Riga	10-12 May	(Estonia) Mattias Vahtel		(Lithuania) Ramūnas Čapkauskas	(Lithuania) DHL Racing Team
1	2	(Latvia) Biķernieki Complex Sports Base, Riga	10-12 May			(Lithuania) Ramūnas Čapkauskas	(Lithuania) DHL Racing Team
2	3	(Finland) Botniaring Racing Circuit, Jurva	14-16 June	(Lithuania) Džiugas Tovilavičius		(Lithuania) Džiugas Tovilavičius	(Lithuania) SKUBA Racing Team
2	4	(Finland) Botniaring Racing Circuit, Jurva	14-16 June			(Lithuania) Julius Adomavičius	(Lithuania) GSR Motorsport
3	5	(Estonia) Auto24ring, Pärnu	28-30 June	(Lithuania) Julius Adomavičius		(Lithuania) Julius Adomavičius	(Lithuania) GSR Motorsport
3	6	(Estonia) Auto24ring, Pärnu	28-30 June			(Lithuania) Džiugas Tovilavičius	(Lithuania) SKUBA Racing Team
4	7	(Latvia) Biķernieki Complex Sports Base, Riga	16–18 August			(Lithuania) Džiugas Tovilavičius	(Lithuania) SKUBA Racing Team
4	8	(Latvia) Biķernieki Complex Sports Base, Riga	16–18 August			(Lithuania) Džiugas Tovilavičius	(Lithuania) SKUBA Racing Team
5	9	(Estonia) Auto24ring, Pärnu	20-22 September	(Lithuania) Julius Adomavičius		(Lithuania) Julius Adomavičius	(Lithuania) GSR Motorsport
5	10	(Estonia) Auto24ring, Pärnu	20-22 September			(Lithuania) Julius Adomavičius	(Lithuania) GSR Motorsport

Scoring system

Position	**1st**	**2nd**	**3rd**	**4th**	**5th**	**6th**	**7th**	**8th**	**9th**	**10th**
Race	25	18	15	12	10	8	6	4	2	1

=== Championship standings ===
Pos.	Driver	(Latvia) BIK		(Finland) BOT		(Estonia) PÄR		(Latvia) BIK		(Estonia) PÄR		Pts.
1	(Lithuania) Džiugas Tovilavičius	4	5	**1**	2	2	1	1	1	3	3	188
2	(Lithuania) Julius Adomavičius	3	2	8	1	**1**	7	2	3	**1**	1	176
3	(Lithuania) Ramunas Capkauskas	1	1	6	6	3	2	4	2	Ret	Ret	129
4	(Russia) Andrey Yushin	7	Ret	7	7	5	4	3	4	5	5	87
5	(Lithuania) Kęstutis Stasionis	Ret	7	5	5	7	3			4	4	71
6	(Estonia) Mattias Vahtel	**2**	3	4	4							57
7	(Estonia) Peeter Peek	6	6			4	5	5	5	6	Ret	56
8	(Russia) Grigoriy Burlutskiy									2	2	36
9	(Estonia) Robin Vaks	Ret	DNS	2	3							33
10	(Lithuania) Egidijus Valeiša	5	4									22
11	(Lithuania) Jurgis Adomavičius					6	6					16
12	(Finland) Emil Westman			3	8							15
13	(Lithuania) Rokas Kvedaras	8†	8									4
14	(Lithuania) Ernesta Globytė	Ret	DNS									0
Pos.	Driver	(Latvia) BIK		(Finland) BOT		(Estonia) PÄR		(Latvia) BIK		(Estonia) PÄR		Pts.

Colour	Result
Gold	Winner
Silver	Second place
Bronze	Third place
Green	Points classification
Blue	Non-points classification
Blue	Non-classified finish (NC)
Purple	Retired, not classified (Ret)
Red	Did not qualify (DNQ)
Red	Did not pre-qualify (DNPQ)
Black	Disqualified (DSQ)
White	Did not start (DNS)
White	Withdrew (WD)
White	Race cancelled (C)
Blank	Did not practice (DNP)
Blank	Did not arrive (DNA)
Blank	Excluded (EX)

**Bold** – Pole
Italics – Fastest Lap

† – Drivers did not finish the race, but were classified as they completed over 75% of the race distance.

== TCR Ibérico Touring Car Series ==
The 2019 TCR Ibérico Touring Car Series season was the third season of the TCR Ibérico Touring Car Series. The championship started at Circuito do Estoril in Portugal on 13 April and ended at Algarve International Circuit in Portugal on 26 October.

=== Calendar and results ===
Rnd.		Circuit	Date	Pole position	Fastest lap	Winning driver	Winning team	Supporting
1	1	Circuito do Estoril, Estoril, Portugal	13 April	(Portugal) Francisco Mora	(Portugal) Francisco Mora	(Portugal) Francisco Mora	(Portugal) Veloso Motorsport	
1	2	Circuito do Estoril, Estoril, Portugal	14 April	(Portugal) Daniel Teixeira	(Portugal) Francisco Mora	(Portugal) Francisco Mora	(Portugal) Veloso Motorsport	
2	3	Circuito Internacional de Vila Real, Vila Real, Portugal	6 July	(Portugal) Francisco Mora	(Estonia) Robin Vaks	(Portugal) Edgar Florindo	(Portugal) Veloso Motorsport	
2	4	Circuito Internacional de Vila Real, Vila Real, Portugal	7 July	(Portugal) Francisco Mora	(Portugal) Francisco Mora	(Portugal) Francisco Mora	(Portugal) Veloso Motorsport	
3	5	Circuit de Barcelona-Catalunya, Montmeló, Spain	21 September	(Sweden) Andreas Bäckman	(France) Julien Briché	(Sweden) Andreas Bäckman	(Italy) Target Competition	TCR Europe Touring Car Series
3	6	Circuit de Barcelona-Catalunya, Montmeló, Spain	22 September		(Belgium) Gilles Magnus	(United Kingdom) Daniel Lloyd	(Slovakia) Brutal Fish Racing Team	TCR Europe Touring Car Series
4	7	Algarve International Circuit, Portimão, Portugal	26 October	(Russia) Evgeniy Leonov	(Portugal) Francisco Mora	(Estonia) Robin Vaks	(Estonia) ALM Honda Racing	GT4 South European Series; F4 Spanish Championship
4	8	Algarve International Circuit, Portimão, Portugal	27 October	(Portugal) Francisco Mora	(Portugal) Francisco Mora	(Portugal) Francisco Mora	(Portugal) Veloso Motorsport	GT4 South European Series; F4 Spanish Championship

=== Championship standings ===
Pos.	Driver	(Portugal) EST		(Portugal) VIL		(Spain) BAR		(Portugal) ALG		Pts.
1	(Portugal) Francisco Mora	**1**	1	**Ret**	**1**	9	19	5	**1**	112
2	(Estonia) Robin Vaks	3	2	3	2	17	23	1	4	103
3	(Estonia) Mattias Vahtel	4	4	2	4	23	Ret	2	2	90
4	(Portugal) Gustavo Moura	2	3	Ret	6	25	Ret	4	Ret	53
5	(Portugal) Daniel Teixeira (Portugal) Joaquim Santos	5	**6**	Ret	5			3	6	51
7	(Portugal) Edgar Florindo			1	3					40
8	(France) Julien Briché					2	3			33
9	(United Kingdom) Daniel Lloyd					8	1			29
10	(Sweden) Andreas Bäckman					**1**	10			26
11	(United Kingdom) Jack Young					4	4			24
12	(Russia) Evgeniy Leonov					Ret	24	7	3	21
13	(Belgium) Gilles Magnus					Ret	**2**			18
14	(France) Nelson Panciatici					5	6			18
15	(Portugal) Manuel Sousa							6	5	18
16	(Portugal) Gabriela Correia	7	5							16
17	(Uruguay) Santiago Urrutia					3	17			15
18	(Portugal) Pedro Marques	6	7							14
19	(Netherlands) Tom Coronel					6	8			12
20	(United Kingdom) Josh Files					21	5			10
21	(Austria) Dominik Baumann					7	9			8
22	(France) Teddy Clairet					20	7			6
23	(Italy) Gianni Morbidelli					10	13			1
24	(Hungary) Tamás Tenke					11	20			0
25	(Germany) Luca Engstler					Ret	11			0
26	(France) Natan Bihel					12	18			0
27	(United Kingdom) Alex Morgan					26	12			0
28	(Slovakia) Mat’o Homola					13	16			0
29	(Belgium) Maxime Potty					14	14			0
30	(France) Aurélien Comte					19	15			0
31	(Hungary) Zsolt Dávid Szabó					15	26			0
32	(Sweden) Jessica Bäckman					16	27			0
33	(Slovakia) Martin Ryba					18	22			0
34	(Finland) Olli Kangas					Ret	21			0
35	(North Macedonia) Viktor Davidovski					22	Ret			0
36	(France) Jimmy Clairet					24	29			0
37	(Italy) Luca Filippi					30	25			0
38	(France) John Filippi					27	Ret			0
39	(France) Marie Baus-Coppens					Ret	28			0
-	(France) Gilles Colombani					Ret	Ret			-
-	(Qatar) Abdulla Ali Al-Khelaifi					Ret	Ret			-
Pos.	Driver	(Portugal) EST		(Portugal) VIL		(Spain) BAR		(Portugal) ALG		Pts.

Colour	Result
Gold	Winner
Silver	Second place
Bronze	Third place
Green	Points classification
Blue	Non-points classification
Blue	Non-classified finish (NC)
Purple	Retired, not classified (Ret)
Red	Did not qualify (DNQ)
Red	Did not pre-qualify (DNPQ)
Black	Disqualified (DSQ)
White	Did not start (DNS)
White	Withdrew (WD)
White	Race cancelled (C)
Blank	Did not practice (DNP)
Blank	Did not arrive (DNA)
Blank	Excluded (EX)

**Bold** – Pole
Italics – Fastest Lap

† – Drivers did not finish the race, but were classified as they completed over 75% of the race distance.
