= Campeonato Nacional de Velocidade =

Portuguese motor racing competition

- Category: Sport-Prototypes, GT's, Touring cars
- Country: Portugal
- Inaugural season: 1955
- Drivers' champion: (Portugal) César Campaniço (5)
- Makes' champion: Novadriver (Audi R8)
- Official website: http://www.fpak.pt/competicoes/2015/velocidade/campeonato-nacional-velocidade-turismos

The Campeonato Nacional de Velocidade (CNV, National Speed Championship) is a Portuguese motor racing competition, encompassing GTs, prototype racing cars and touring cars. It was established in the 1960s.

The competition was established in the 1960s and today has Group 5 and Group 4 (racing) cars. In the 1970a and 1980s, Group A and Group B cars took part towards the end of the 1980s and into the 1990s. This was superseded by Group N, that is, production cars with similar specifications to road-legal cars, from the end of the 1990s until 2006.

In 2007, the Campeonato Nacional de Turismos was created for S2000 cars. In 2011, this championship ended because of lack of participants, so the GT cars went to race in the higher class.

Since 2010 the series has been organised by Full Eventos under the "Racing Weekend" brand. As of 2015, the competition consists of five qualifying races and two finals. The CNV is run alongside other competitions such as the Campeonato de Portugal de Clássicos and together they are known under the English-language name "Racing Weekend". These other competitions include:

- Campeonato Nacional de Sport Protótipos
- Campeonato Nacional de GT
- Campeonato Nacional de Turismos

== Heats ==
Date	Venue	CNV (Note: This competition)	CNC (Note: Campeonato National de Clássicos)	Abarth (Note: Abarth 500 single-marque trophy))	Super7 (Note: Super 7 by Kia (Caterham 7 single-marque trophy))	SSS (Note: Single Seater Series)	FEUP (Note: Fiat Punto and Alfa Romeo 156 combined marques trophy))	CSS (Note: Classic Super Stock)	HE (Note: Historic Endurance)
5 April	Estoril	-	-	-	X	-	-	-	-
12/13 April	Braga	X	X	X	-	X	X	X	-
10/11-May	Rampa da Falperra	X	X	X	-	-	X	-	-
17/18 May	GP Histórico Pau (FRA)	-	-	-	-	-	-	-	X
24/25 May	Rampa Serra da Estrela	X	X	-	-	-	X	-	-
6/7 June	Jarama Hist. Fest (ESP)	-	-	-	X	-	-	-	X
21/22 June	Vila Real	X	X	X	X	X	X	X	X
19/20 July	Algarve I	X	-	X	-	X	-	-	-
26/27 July	Rampa Capital do Móvel	-	-	-	-	-	X	-	-
6/7 September	Algarve II	X	X	X	X	-	X	-	-
4/5 October	Estoril	X	X	X	X	X	X	X	-
18/19 October	Algarve Class Fest	-	-	-	-	-	-	X	X
29/30 November	Estoril Fest.	T	T	-	X	X	-	X	X
