= 2010 European Touring Car Cup =

Motorsport contest

Seasons
- ← 2009 2011 →

The 2010 FIA European Touring Car Cup was the sixth running of the FIA European Touring Car Cup. The cup was expanded to three events for 2010, unlike in previous years where it was a one-off event. The season began at Braga on 28 March, and finished at Franciacorta on 17 October. Each event included two races of 50 kilometres (31 miles) in length, making a total of six rounds awarding points. At the end of the season, three FIA cups were awarded, one for each of the eligible categories: Super 2000, Super 1600 and Super Production. 100,000 euro prize money was awarded at each of the four race meetings: 65,000 euros to Super 2000, 25,000 to Super 1600 and 10,000 to Super Production.

In the top Super 2000 class, despite pressure from Michel Nykjær – who won each of the four races he contested at the Salzburgring and Franciacorta – in a SEAT León TDI, Hartmann Honda Racing's James Thompson finished as the class winner, with six top-three finishes in the season's six races, taking a victory in Braga en route to a four-point title win. César Campaniço was the other race winner at Braga, in a one-off outing in the Cup. Super Production was poorly supported with only Vojislav Lekić, Fabio Fabiani and Marcis Birkens competing in any of the races. Lekić won the four races he contested, ahead of Fabiani while Birkens suffered a retirement and a DNS in Braga. Carsten Seifert won the Super 1600 title, finishing with three victories and a total of six top-two finishes. He narrowly beat Jens Löhnig, who also had three wins, by ten points.

== Teams and drivers ==
Super 2000 class
Team	Car	No.	Drivers	Rounds
(Denmark) Hartmann Honda Racing	Honda Accord Euro R	1	(United Kingdom) James Thompson	All
(Denmark) Hartmann Honda Racing	Honda Accord Euro R	2	(Sweden) Tomas Engström	1
(Denmark) Hartmann Honda Racing	Honda Accord Euro R	4	(Austria) Wolfgang Treml	2–3
(Sweden) Engström Motorsport	Honda Accord Euro R	2	(Sweden) Tomas Engström	2–3
(Croatia) Čolak Racing Team	SEAT León	3	(Croatia) Marin Čolak^{1}	1–2
(Ukraine) Bevz Kostantyn	BMW 320i E46	5	(Ukraine) Irina Protasova	1–2
(Ukraine) Bevz Kostantyn	BMW 320i E46	6	(Ukraine) Yuriy Protasov	1
(Ukraine) Bevz Kostantyn	BMW 320i E46	7	(Ukraine) Leonid Protasov	1–2
(Spain) SUNRED Engineering	SEAT León	8	(Russia) Timur Sadredinov	1
(Spain) SUNRED Engineering	SEAT León	12	(France) Michaël Rossi	1–2
(Spain) SUNRED Engineering	SEAT León TDI	21	(Denmark) Michel Nykjær	2–3
(Portugal) Novadriver Racing Team	BMW 320si	9	(Portugal) César Campaniço	1
(Denmark) Poulsen Motorsport	BMW 320si	11	(Denmark) Kristian Poulsen	1
(Turkey) Borusan Otomotiv Motorsport	BMW 320si	10	(Turkey) Aytaç Biter	2–3
(Turkey) Borusan Otomotiv Motorsport	BMW 320si	13	(Turkey) Ibrahim Okyay	All
(Portugal) Sports & You	BMW 320si	14	(Portugal) Francisco Carvalho^{2}	
(Ukraine) Tsunami Racing Team	BMW 320i E46	17	(Ukraine) Andrii Kruglyk	2
(Switzerland) Rikli Motorsport	Honda Civic Type-R	19	(Switzerland) Peter Rikli	2–3
(Switzerland) Rikli Motorsport	Honda Accord Euro R	20	(Switzerland) Jörg Schori	2–3
(Germany) Mayer Motorsport	Audi A4	22	(Germany) Oliver Mayer^{3}	2
(Germany) Liqui Moly Team Engstler	BMW 320si	23	(Russia) Rustem Teregulov	2
(Italy) Promotor Sport	BMW 320i E46	29	(Italy) Massimo Zanin	3
(Italy) Promotor Sport	BMW 320i E46	30	(Italy) Mariano Bellin	3
Super Production class
(Latvia) SC Papa's Racing Team	Honda Civic Type-R	51	(Latvia) Marcis Birkens	1
(Italy) F Motorsport	BMW 320i E46	52	(Italy) Fabio Fabiani	2–3
(Serbia) Đelmaš Sport	Honda Civic Type-R	54	(Serbia) Vojislav Lekić	2–3
Super 1600 class
(Germany) NK Racing Team	Ford Fiesta ST	71	(Germany) Carsten Seifert	All
(Germany) NK Racing Team	Ford Fiesta ST	73	(Germany) Florian Heitmeier	1
(Germany) ATM Racing	Ford Fiesta ST	72	(Germany) Jens Löhnig	1
(Germany) ATM Racing	Ford Fiesta 1.6 16V	72	(Germany) Jens Löhnig	2–3
(Germany) ATM Racing	Ford Fiesta ST	74	(Russia) Sergey Krylov	2
(Germany) ATM Racing	Ford Fiesta 1.6 16v	74	(Russia) Sergey Krylov	3
(Germany) ATM Racing	Ford Fiesta ST	76	(Germany) Charlie Geipel	3
(Croatia) Gena Autosport	Citroën C2 VTS	75	(Croatia) Zeljko Marković	3

^{1} Despite being on the Salzburgring entry list, Čolak did not compete at the meeting.

^{2} Despite being listed on the FIA ETCC website, Carvalho did not attend any of the meetings.

^{3} Although he was present at the Salzburgring meeting, Mayer did not take part. Instead he chose to focus on the ADAC Procar championship round which was held at the same event.

== Race calendar and results ==
Round		Country	Circuit	Date	Pole position	Fastest lap	Winning driver	Winning team
1	R1	Portugal	Circuito Vasco Sameiro, Braga	28 March	(United Kingdom) James Thompson	(Sweden) Tomas Engström	(United Kingdom) James Thompson	(Denmark) Hartmann Honda Racing
1	R2	Portugal	Circuito Vasco Sameiro, Braga	28 March		(Portugal) César Campaniço	(Portugal) César Campaniço	(Portugal) Novadriver Racing Team
2	R1	Austria	Salzburgring	25 July	(United Kingdom) James Thompson	(Denmark) Michel Nykjær	(Denmark) Michel Nykjær	(Spain) SUNRED Engineering
2	R2	Austria	Salzburgring	25 July		(Denmark) Michel Nykjær	(Denmark) Michel Nykjær	(Spain) SUNRED Engineering
3	R1	Germany	Motorsport Arena Oschersleben	5 September	round cancelled			
3	R2	Germany	Motorsport Arena Oschersleben	5 September	round cancelled			
4	R1	Italy	Autodromo di Franciacorta	17 October	(United Kingdom) James Thompson	(Denmark) Michel Nykjær	(Denmark) Michel Nykjær	(Spain) SUNRED Engineering
4	R2	Italy	Autodromo di Franciacorta	17 October		(Denmark) Michel Nykjær	(Denmark) Michel Nykjær	(Spain) SUNRED Engineering

== Championship standings ==
=== Super 2000 ===
Pos	Driver	BRA (Portugal)		SAL (Austria)		FRA (Italy)		Pts
1	(United Kingdom) James Thompson	**1**	3	**2**	2	**3**	3	44
2	(Denmark) Michel Nykjær			1	1	1	1	40
3	(Sweden) Tomas Engström	2	7	3	3	2	2	38
4	(Turkey) Ibrahim Okyay	5	4	7	6	5	5	22
5	(Austria) Wolfgang Treml			4	4	4	6	18
6	(Portugal) César Campaniço	4	1					15
7	(Denmark) Kristian Poulsen	3	2					14
8	(Switzerland) Peter Rikli			NC	16	6	4	8
9	(France) Michaël Rossi	6	Ret	Ret	5			7
10	(Turkey) Aytaç Biter			5	8	8	**8**	7
11	(Croatia) Marin Čolak	7	6					5
12	(Ukraine) Andrii Kruglyk			6	7			5
13	(Russia) Timur Sadredinov	9	5					4
14	(Switzerland) Jörg Schori			12	10	7	7	4
15	(Ukraine) Yuriy Protasov	8	**8**					2
16	(Ukraine) Leonid Protasov	10	9	8	**9**			1
17	(Ukraine) Irina Protasova	12	12	9	Ret			0
18	(Italy) Massimo Zanin					9	NC	0
	(Russia) Rustem Teregulov			DNS	DNS			0
	(Italy) Mariano Bellin					DNS	DNS	0
Pos	Driver	BRA (Portugal)		SAL (Austria)		FRA (Italy)		Pts

Colour	Result
Gold	Winner
Silver	Second place
Bronze	Third place
Green	Points classification
Blue	Non-points classification
Blue	Non-classified finish (NC)
Purple	Retired, not classified (Ret)
Red	Did not qualify (DNQ)
Red	Did not pre-qualify (DNPQ)
Black	Disqualified (DSQ)
White	Did not start (DNS)
White	Withdrew (WD)
White	Race cancelled (C)
Blank	Did not practice (DNP)
Blank	Did not arrive (DNA)
Blank	Excluded (EX)

**Bold** - Pole
Italics - Fastest Lap

=== Super Production ===
Pos	Driver	BRA (Portugal)		SAL (Austria)		FRA (Italy)		Pts
1	(Serbia) Vojislav Lekić			**10**	**11**	**11**	**11**	**40**
2	(Italy) Fabio Fabiani			11	12	14	12	**32**
	(Latvia) Marcis Birkens	**Ret**	DNS					**0**
Pos	Driver	BRA (Portugal)		SAL (Austria)		FRA (Italy)		Pts

=== Super 1600 ===
Pos	Driver	BRA (Portugal)		SAL (Austria)		FRA (Italy)		Pts
1	(Germany) Carsten Seifert	13	11	**13**	**14**	**10**	**9**	54
2	(Germany) Jens Löhnig	**11**	**10**	NC	13	12	13	44
3	(Russia) Sergey Krylov			14	15	13	14	25
4	(Germany) Charlie Geipel					16	10	12
5	(Germany) Florian Heitmeier	14	13					12
6	(Croatia) Zeljko Marković					15	15	9
Pos	Driver	BRA (Portugal)		SAL (Austria)		FRA (Italy)		Pts
