= 2009 European Touring Car Cup =

Motorsport contest

Seasons
- ← 2008 2010 →

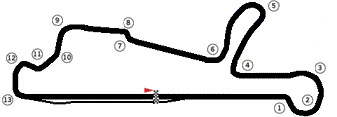
Layout of the Circuito Vasco Sameiro

The 2009 FIA European Touring Car Cup was the fifth running of the FIA European Touring Car Cup. It was held on 25 October 2009 at the Circuito Vasco Sameiro near Braga in Portugal. James Thompson won the event after winning the second race. Norbert Michelisz won the first race.

== Entry list ==
Super 2000 class
Team	Car	No	Drivers	Regular series
(Denmark) Perfection Racing	Chevrolet Lacetti	1	(Denmark) Michel Nykjær	Danish Touring Car Championship
(Sweden) Engström Motorsport	Honda Accord Euro R	2	(Sweden) Tomas Engström	Swedish Touring Car Championship
(Germany) Liqui Moly Team Engstler	BMW 320si	3	(Estonia) Urmas Kitsing	German ADAC Procar Series
(Germany) Liqui Moly Team Engstler	BMW 320si	4	(Germany) Franz Engstler	World Touring Car Championship
(Spain) SEAT Sport	SEAT León TDi	5	(Hungary) Norbert Michelisz	SEAT León Eurocup
(Portugal) Veloso Motorsport	SEAT León	6	(Portugal) Francisco Carvalho	Portuguese Touring Car Championship
(Switzerland) Maurer Motorsport	Chevrolet Lacetti	7	(Belgium) Vincent Radermecker^{†}	German ADAC Procar Series
(Switzerland) Maurer Motorsport	Chevrolet Lacetti	8	(Portugal) José Monroy	Portuguese Touring Car Championship
(United Kingdom) Bamboo Engineering	Chevrolet Lacetti	9	(Portugal) Duarte Fèlix da Costa	Portuguese Touring Car Championship
(United Kingdom) Bamboo Engineering	Chevrolet Lacetti	10	(United Kingdom) Harry Vaulkhard	British Touring Car Championship
(Denmark) Hartmann Honda Racing	Honda Accord Euro R	11	(United Kingdom) James Thompson	Various
(Denmark) Hartmann Honda Racing	Honda Accord Euro R	12	(Denmark) Per Poulsen	Danish Touring Car Championship
(Portugal) Sports & You	BMW 320si	14	(Portugal) José Pedro Fontes^{‡}	Portuguese Touring Car Championship
Super Production class
(Latvia) AV Motorsport	Honda Civic Type-R	21	(Latvia) Marcis Birkens	Baltic Touring Car Championship
(Russia) Sport-Garage	Volkswagen Golf IV	22	(Russia) Nikolay Karamyshev	Russian Touring Car Championship
(Russia) Sport-Garage	BMW 320i	23	(Russia) Mikhail Zasadych	Russian Touring Car Championship
Super 1600 class
(Germany) NK Racing Team	Ford Fiesta ST	31	(Germany) Carsten Seifert	German ADAC Procar Series

† Although in attendance, Radermecker did not compete due to a technical problem with his car.

‡ Despite entering the event, Fontes did not attend.

== Report ==
=== Qualifying ===
SEAT Leon Eurocup champion Norbert Michelisz took pole position from Franz Engstler at the very end of the session. Bamboo Engineering pairing Duarte Félix Da Costa and Harry Vaulkhard locked out the second row of the grid. Pre-event favourites James Thompson and Michel Nykjær qualified down in sixth and eighth respectively. Vincent Radermecker was forced to sit out the session due to problems with his Chevrolet Lacetti.

== Classification ==
=== Race 1 ===
Pos	No	Class	Driver	Team	Car	Laps	Time/Retired	Grid	Class Points
1	5	S2000	(Hungary) Norbert Michelisz	SEAT Sport	SEAT León TDi	17	25:54.375	1	10
2	4	S2000	(Germany) Franz Engstler	Liqui Moly Team Engstler	BMW 320si	17	+0.442	2	8
3	11	S2000	(United Kingdom) James Thompson	Hartmann Honda Racing	Honda Accord Euro R	17	+3.683	6	6
4	1	S2000	(Denmark) Michel Nykjær	Perfection Racing	Chevrolet Lacetti	17	+10.283	8	5
5	10	S2000	(United Kingdom) Harry Vaulkhard	Bamboo Engineering	Chevrolet Lacetti	17	+20.927	4	4
6	8	S2000	(Portugal) José Monroy	Maurer Motorsport	Chevrolet Lacetti	17	+34.125	9	3
7	6	S2000	(Portugal) Francisco Carvalho	Veloso Motorsport	SEAT León TFSi	17	+53.270	7	2
8	9	S2000	(Portugal) Duarte Félix da Costa	Bamboo Engineering	Chevrolet Lacetti	17	+57.518	3	1
9	2	S2000	(Sweden) Tomas Engström	Engström Motorsport	Honda Accord Euro R	17	+1:07.001	5	
10	3	S2000	(Estonia) Urmas Kitsing	Liqui Moly Team Engstler	BMW 320si	17	+1:07.355	11	
11	21	SP	(Latvia) Marcis Birkens	AV Motorsport	Honda Civic Type-R	16	+ 1 lap	13	10
12	23	SP	(Russia) Mikhail Zasadych	Sport-Garage	BMW 320i	16	+ 1 lap	12	8
13	31	S1600	(Germany) Carsten Seifert	NK Racing Team	Ford Fiesta ST	16	+ 1 lap	14	10
14	22	SP	(Russia) Nikolay Karamyshev	Sport-Garage	Volkswagen Golf IV	14	+ 3 laps	27	6
Ret	12	S2000	(Denmark) Per Poulsen	Hartmann Honda Racing	Honda Accord Euro R	3	Accident	10	

== Final standings ==
Pos	Driver	Race 1	Race 2	Pts
Super 2000
1	(United Kingdom) James Thompson	3	1	16
2	(Germany) Franz Engstler	2	2	16
3	(Hungary) Norbert Michelisz	**1**	5	14
4	(Portugal) Francisco Carvalho	7	4	7
5	(United Kingdom) Harry Vaulkhard	5	6	7
6	(Sweden) Tomas Engström	9	3	6
7	(Denmark) Michel Nykjær	4	Ret	5
8	(Portugal) José Monroy	6	Ret	3
9	(Portugal) Duarte Félix da Costa	8	**7**	3
10	(Denmark) Per Poulsen	Ret	8	1
11	(Estonia) Urmas Kitsing	10	Ret	0
Super Production
1	(Latvia) Marcis Birkens	11	**9**	20
2	(Russia) Mikhail Zasadych	**12**	11	16
3	(Russia) Nikolay Karamyshev	14	Ret	6
Super 1600
1	(Germany) Carsten Seifert	**13**	**10**	20
Pos	Driver	Race 1	Race 2	Pts

Colour	Result
Gold	Winner
Silver	Second place
Bronze	Third place
Green	Points classification
Blue	Non-points classification
Blue	Non-classified finish (NC)
Purple	Retired, not classified (Ret)
Red	Did not qualify (DNQ)
Red	Did not pre-qualify (DNPQ)
Black	Disqualified (DSQ)
White	Did not start (DNS)
White	Withdrew (WD)
White	Race cancelled (C)
Blank	Did not practice (DNP)
Blank	Did not arrive (DNA)
Blank	Excluded (EX)

**Bold** – Pole
Italics – Fastest Lap
