= 2018 World Touring Car Cup =

Motorsport contest

Champions
- Drivers' Champion: Gabriele Tarquini
- Teams' Champion: M Racing–YMR

Seasons
- ← 2017 (WTCC); 2017 (TCR) 2019 →

The 2018 FIA World Touring Car Cup (known as the FIA WTCR presented by Oscaro for sponsorship reasons) was the inaugural season of the World Touring Car Cup (WTCR). It took over from the World Touring Car Championship and adopted the TCR technical regulations. It was also the 14th overall season of the series that dates from the 2005 World Touring Car Championship. The change of name and new rules follow the declining interest in the TC1 regulations used by the World Touring Car Championship between 2014 and 2017 and the growing interest among manufacturers in the TCR touring car category.

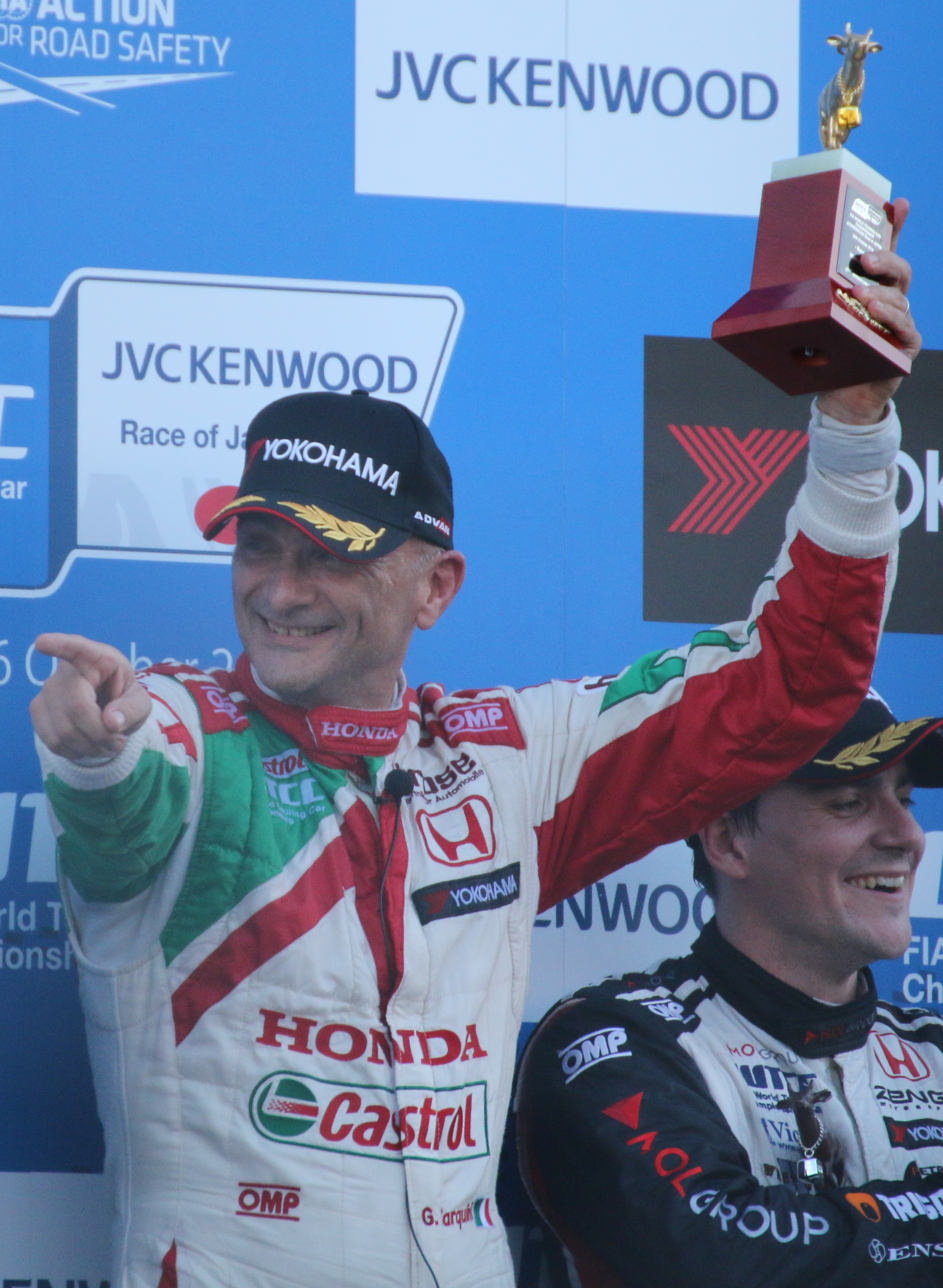
Gabriele Tarquini (pictured in 2014), won the Drivers' Championship.

== Teams and drivers ==
Team	Car	No.	Drivers	Rounds
Season entries
(Italy) BRC Racing Team	Hyundai i30 N TCR	5	(Hungary) Norbert Michelisz	All
(Italy) BRC Racing Team	Hyundai i30 N TCR	30	(Italy) Gabriele Tarquini	All
(Belgium) DG Sport Compétition	Peugeot 308 GTi TCR	7	(France) Aurélien Comte	All
(Belgium) DG Sport Compétition	Peugeot 308 GTi TCR	70	(Slovakia) Maťo Homola	All
(Hungary) Zengő Motorsport	CUPRA León TCR	8	(Hungary) Norbert Nagy	All
(Hungary) Zengő Motorsport	CUPRA León TCR	66	(Hungary) Zsolt Szabó	All
(Belgium) Boutsen Ginion Racing	Honda Civic Type R TCR (FK8)	9	(Netherlands) Tom Coronel	All
(Belgium) Boutsen Ginion Racing	Honda Civic Type R TCR (FK8)	18	(Portugal) Tiago Monteiro	9
(Belgium) Boutsen Ginion Racing	Honda Civic Type R TCR (FK8)	55	(China) Ma Qing Hua	7–8, 10
(Belgium) Boutsen Ginion Racing	Honda Civic Type R TCR (FK8)	63	(Belgium) Benjamin Lessennes	1–6
(Italy) Team Mulsanne	Alfa Romeo Giulietta Veloce TCR	10	(Italy) Gianni Morbidelli	1–5
(Italy) Team Mulsanne	Alfa Romeo Giulietta Veloce TCR	16	(Italy) Luigi Ferrara	9–10
(Italy) Team Mulsanne	Alfa Romeo Giulietta Veloce TCR	31	(Italy) Kevin Ceccon	6–10
(Italy) Team Mulsanne	Alfa Romeo Giulietta Veloce TCR	88	(Italy) Fabrizio Giovanardi	1–8
(France) M Racing-YMR	Hyundai i30 N TCR	11	(Sweden) Thed Björk	All
(France) M Racing-YMR	Hyundai i30 N TCR	48	(France) Yvan Muller	All
(France) Sébastien Loeb Racing	Volkswagen Golf GTI TCR	12	(United Kingdom) Robert Huff	All
(France) Sébastien Loeb Racing	Volkswagen Golf GTI TCR	25	(Morocco) Mehdi Bennani	All
(Germany) ALL-INKL.COM Münnich Motorsport	Honda Civic Type R TCR (FK8)	15	(United Kingdom) James Thompson	1–5
(Germany) ALL-INKL.COM Münnich Motorsport	Honda Civic Type R TCR (FK8)	42	(Germany) Timo Scheider (Note: Scheider is a German driver who raced under Austrian racing license.)	7–10
(Germany) ALL-INKL.COM Münnich Motorsport	Honda Civic Type R TCR (FK8)	68	(France) Yann Ehrlacher	All
(Germany) ALL-INKL.COM Münnich Motorsport	Honda Civic Type R TCR (FK8)	86	(Argentina) Esteban Guerrieri	All
(Belgium) Audi Sport Team Comtoyou	Audi RS 3 LMS TCR	20	(Belgium) Denis Dupont	All
(Belgium) Audi Sport Team Comtoyou	Audi RS 3 LMS TCR	22	(Belgium) Frédéric Vervisch	All
(Belgium) Comtoyou Racing	Audi RS 3 LMS TCR	21	(France) Aurélien Panis	All
(Belgium) Comtoyou Racing	Audi RS 3 LMS TCR	23	(France) Nathanaël Berthon	All
(Spain) Team Oscaro by Campos Racing	CUPRA León TCR	27	(France) John Filippi	All
(Spain) Team Oscaro by Campos Racing	CUPRA León TCR	74	(Spain) Pepe Oriola	All
(Luxembourg) Audi Sport Leopard Lukoil Team WRT	Audi RS 3 LMS TCR	52	(United Kingdom) Gordon Shedden	All
(Luxembourg) Audi Sport Leopard Lukoil Team WRT	Audi RS 3 LMS TCR	69	(France) Jean-Karl Vernay	All
Wildcard entries
(Netherlands) Bas Koeten Racing	Audi RS 3 LMS TCR	2	(Netherlands) Bernhard van Oranje-Nassau	4
(Netherlands) Bas Koeten Racing	Audi RS 3 LMS TCR	3	(Netherlands) Michael Verhagen	4
(Macau) PCT-IXO Models Racing Team	Volkswagen Golf GTI TCR	6	(Macau) Rui Valente	10
(Portugal) Veloso Motorsport	CUPRA León TCR	13	(Portugal) Edgar Florindo	5
(Slovakia) Brutal Fish Racing Team	Volkswagen Golf GTI TCR	17	(Slovakia) Andrej Studenič	6
(Hong Kong) KCMG	Honda Civic Type R TCR (FK8)	19	(Hungary) Attila Tassi	2
(Hong Kong) KCMG	Honda Civic Type R TCR (FK8)	94	(Switzerland) Kris Richard	3
(Italy) Target Competition	Honda Civic Type R TCR (FK2)	26	(Portugal) José Rodrigues	5
(Hong Kong) Teamwork Motorsport	Audi RS 3 LMS TCR	28	(Macau) Kevin Tse	10
(Belgium) Audi Sport Team WRT	Audi RS 3 LMS TCR	33	(Germany) René Rast	3
(China) TSRT Zuver Team	Audi RS 3 LMS TCR	36	(Macau) Lo Kai Fung	10
(Czech Republic) Fullin Race Academy	CUPRA León TCR	44	(Czech Republic) Petr Fulín	6
(China) Champ Motorsport	Audi RS 3 LMS TCR	60	(Macau) Filipe de Souza	10
(China) Champ Motorsport	Audi RS 3 LMS TCR	77	(Macau) Lam Kam San	10
(Macau) MacPro Racing Team	Honda Civic Type R TCR (FK8)	89	(Macau) André Couto	10
(Hungary) M1RA	Hyundai i30 N TCR	99	(Hungary) Dániel Nagy	2

=== Team and driver changes ===
- As the new WTCR regulations do not allow factory teams, Polestar Cyan Racing will not take part in the new series. Thus Nick Catsburg and Néstor Girolami left the team with Girolami returning to Super TC 2000 Championship and Catsburg joining BMW to race in the FIA World Endurance Championship. Development driver Yvan Muller, who competed as one-off entry last season, formed Yvan Muller Racing with 2017 WTCC champion Thed Björk with the team using the Hyundai i30 N TCR for the season.
- Norbert Michelisz left Honda Racing Team JAS to join BRC Racing Team in the second Hyundai i30 N TCR. He'll be joined by Gabriele Tarquini, who had competed with the team in the 2017 TCR International Series in the final two rounds of the season.
- Sébastien Loeb Racing will enter two Volkswagen Golf GTI TCR cars for the 2018 season for Robert Huff, who raced the previous season for ALL-INKL.COM Münnich Motorsport in WTCC and Leopard Racing Team WRT in partial TCR International Series campaign, and Mehdi Bennani. With the decision to sign Huff and keep Bennani 2017 WTCC Trophy winner Tom Chilton left the team to compete in the British Touring Car Championship with Motorbase Performance. Chilton had participated in both WTCC and BTCC in 2017 before announcing that he would be competing in BTCC only.
- After competing in the final two races of the 2017 TCR International Series season, TCR BeNeLux regular Denis Dupont would make his full-time début with Comtoyou Racing. He will be partnered by Aurélien Panis, who made appearances in both WTCC with Zengő Motorsport and TCR International Series with Boutsen Ginion Racing. The team later announced that they would expand to 4 cars adding Frédéric Vervisch and Nathanaël Berthon. In accordance with team size regulations, Vervisch and Dupont will enter under the entry Audi Sport Team Comtoyou, scoring separately from Comtoyou Racing. With these announcements double TCR International Series overall winner Stefano Comini left the team.
- Boutsen Ginion Racing will switch to the new Honda Civic Type R TCR (FK8) for the 2018 season. Former Honda Racing Team JAS driver Tiago Monteiro will drive one of the cars. He will drive alongside Tom Coronel joining from ROAL Motorsport. On 26 March Benjamin Lessennes, the 2017 TCR BeNeLux Touring Car Championship winner with the team, was announced as replacement for Monteiro for the first rounds of the season as Monteiro was not medically cleared. Lessennes was already signed as the team's test and developmental driver prior to the decision.
- ALL-INKL.COM Münnich Motorsport entered three Honda Civic Type R TCR (FK8) for Esteban Guerrieri, who comes from Honda Racing Team JAS, Yann Ehrlacher, who moves from RC Motorsport, and at selected races for James Thompson, who last raced for Lada Sport in the 2015 World Touring Car Championship. Guerrieri and Ehrlacher are nominated by the team to score points in the teams' championship.
- Craft-Bamboo Racing will move to TCR Europe for 2018 with a two-car entry with the car which will they run is yet to be announced. Pepe Oriola moved to Campos Racing, while James Nash returned to the British Touring Car Championship with BTC Norlin Racing.
- W Racing Team (competing under the guise of Leopard Racing Team WRT), will switch from Volkswagen Golf GTI TCR to Audi RS 3 LMS TCR competing under the Audi Sport Leopard Lukoil Racing banner for sponsorship reasons. 2017 TCR International Series drivers' winner Jean-Karl Vernay and Gordon Shedden, who has competed for the team in Dubai, will drive the two cars. 2017 DTM champion René Rast will make one-off appearance for the team (as Audi Sport Team WRT) at the Nordschleife as wildcard entrant
- M1RA, the 2017 TCR International Series teams' champions, will move to the TCR Europe Series replacing the Honda Civic Type R TCR for Hyundai i30 TCR. Dániel Nagy will drive one of the cars, moving from Zengő Motorsport. Attila Tassi, who finished as runner-up in the drivers' standings, will leave the team becoming JAS Motorsport's test driver and will drive a Honda Civic Type R TCR (FK8) in TCR Europe Series for KCMG. Both Nagy and Tassi made one-off appearances as wildcard entrants in Hungary.
- DG Sport Compétition switched from Opel Astra TCR to Peugeot 308 TCR and retained Maťo Homola and Aurélien Comte.
- Romeo Ferraris signed Fabrizio Giovanardi, who returns to full-time competition after last competing in the 2014 British Touring Car Championship, and Gianni Morbidelli, who competed for WestCoast Racing in the 2017 TCR International Series season. With these announcements Dušan Borković and Davit Kajaia will leave the team with Borković set to drive in the TCR Europe Series for Target Competition.
- After competing with Sébastien Loeb Racing in 2017, John Filippi returned to his previous team Campos Racing driving a Cupra León TCR.

== Calendar ==
The 2018 championship was contested over thirty rounds in Europe, Africa and East Asia.

A provisional calendar was released in December 2017. In March 2018 an additional round in China was added at the Wuhan Street Circuit.

Rnd.	Race	Race name	Circuit	Date	Supporting
1	1	AFRIQUIA Race of Morocco	(Morocco) Circuit International Automobile Moulay El Hassan	7 April	stand-alone event
1	2	AFRIQUIA Race of Morocco	(Morocco) Circuit International Automobile Moulay El Hassan	8 April	stand-alone event
1	3	AFRIQUIA Race of Morocco	(Morocco) Circuit International Automobile Moulay El Hassan	8 April	stand-alone event
2	4	Race of Hungary	(Hungary) Hungaroring	28 April	stand-alone event
2	5	Race of Hungary	(Hungary) Hungaroring	29 April	stand-alone event
2	6	Race of Hungary	(Hungary) Hungaroring	29 April	stand-alone event
3	7	Race of Germany	(Germany) Nürburgring Nordschleife	10 May	Nürburgring 24 Hours
3	8	Race of Germany	(Germany) Nürburgring Nordschleife	12 May	Nürburgring 24 Hours
3	9	Race of Germany	(Germany) Nürburgring Nordschleife	12 May	Nürburgring 24 Hours
4	10	Race of the Netherlands	(Netherlands) Circuit Zandvoort	20 May	TCR Europe Series; TCR Benelux Touring Car Championship; TCR Swiss Trophy
4	11	Race of the Netherlands	(Netherlands) Circuit Zandvoort	21 May	TCR Europe Series; TCR Benelux Touring Car Championship; TCR Swiss Trophy
4	12	Race of the Netherlands	(Netherlands) Circuit Zandvoort	21 May	TCR Europe Series; TCR Benelux Touring Car Championship; TCR Swiss Trophy
5	13	Race of Portugal	(Portugal) Circuito Internacional de Vila Real	23 June	Campeonato Nacional de Velocidade Turismos
5	14	Race of Portugal	(Portugal) Circuito Internacional de Vila Real	24 June	Campeonato Nacional de Velocidade Turismos
5	15	Race of Portugal	(Portugal) Circuito Internacional de Vila Real	24 June	Campeonato Nacional de Velocidade Turismos
6	16	Race of Slovakia	Automotodróm Slovakia Ring	14 July	2018 European Truck Racing Championship
6	17	Race of Slovakia	Automotodróm Slovakia Ring	14 July	2018 European Truck Racing Championship
6	18	Race of Slovakia	Automotodróm Slovakia Ring	15 July	2018 European Truck Racing Championship
7	19	Race of China – Ningbo	(China) Ningbo International Circuit	29 September	China Touring Car Championship; TCR China Touring Car Championship
7	20	Race of China – Ningbo	(China) Ningbo International Circuit	30 September	China Touring Car Championship; TCR China Touring Car Championship
7	21	Race of China – Ningbo	(China) Ningbo International Circuit	30 September	China Touring Car Championship; TCR China Touring Car Championship
8	22	Race of China – Wuhan	(China) Wuhan Street Circuit	6 October	China Touring Car Championship; China Endurance Championship; China Racing Truck Championship
8	23	Race of China – Wuhan	(China) Wuhan Street Circuit	7 October	China Touring Car Championship; China Endurance Championship; China Racing Truck Championship
8	24	Race of China – Wuhan	(China) Wuhan Street Circuit	7 October	China Touring Car Championship; China Endurance Championship; China Racing Truck Championship
9	25	JVCKENWOOD Race of Japan	(Japan) Suzuka Circuit	27 October	Super Formula Championship
9	26	JVCKENWOOD Race of Japan	(Japan) Suzuka Circuit	28 October	Super Formula Championship
9	27	JVCKENWOOD Race of Japan	(Japan) Suzuka Circuit	28 October	Super Formula Championship
10	28	Guia Race of Macau	Guia Circuit, Macau	17 November	FIA F3 World Cup; FIA GT World Cup; Macau Touring Car Cup
10	29	Guia Race of Macau	Guia Circuit, Macau	18 November	FIA F3 World Cup; FIA GT World Cup; Macau Touring Car Cup
10	30	Guia Race of Macau	Guia Circuit, Macau	18 November	FIA F3 World Cup; FIA GT World Cup; Macau Touring Car Cup

== Rule changes ==
=== Sporting regulations ===
- With titles for drivers and teams only the new series will receive "World Cup" rather than "World Championship" status. Manufacturers will be able to develop cars for competition that are then sold to privateer entrants and will also be allowed to provide ongoing support and development to those teams.
- The WTCR series will be capped at 26 entries with up to two wildcards nominated by the organizers at each race weekend. The entry cap will be in place for all races except for Macau where six wildcards were nominated. All Teams will have to enter a minimum two cars with an entry fee of 150,000 Euro.
- The weekend format was also changed. Now there are three races per weekend instead of two with the first race being held on Saturdays with its own 30-minute qualifying session right after the two Free Practice sessions. On Sundays there is going to be another qualifying session to determine the grid for Race 3, while Race 2's starting grid will have the Top 10 drivers from the session in reverse order.
- The tires will be supplied by Yokohama and the fuel by Panta.

== Results ==
Race	Race name	Pole position	Fastest lap	Winning driver	Winning team	Report
1	Race of Morocco	(Sweden) Thed Björk	(Italy) Gabriele Tarquini	(Italy) Gabriele Tarquini	(Italy) BRC Racing Team	Report
2	Race of Morocco		(France) Jean-Karl Vernay	(France) Jean-Karl Vernay	(Luxembourg) Audi Sport Leopard Lukoil Team WRT	Report
3	Race of Morocco	(Italy) Gabriele Tarquini	(Italy) Gabriele Tarquini	(Italy) Gabriele Tarquini	(Italy) BRC Racing Team	Report
4	Race of Hungary	(Hungary) Norbert Michelisz	(Argentina) Esteban Guerrieri	(France) Yann Ehrlacher	(Germany) ALL-INKL.COM Münnich Motorsport	Report
5	Race of Hungary		(Hungary) Dániel Nagy	(United Kingdom) Robert Huff	(France) Sébastien Loeb Racing	Report
6	Race of Hungary	(Hungary) Norbert Michelisz	(France) Yann Ehrlacher	(Italy) Gabriele Tarquini	(Italy) BRC Racing Team	Report
7	Race of Germany	(Sweden) Thed Björk	(Hungary) Norbert Michelisz	(France) Yvan Muller	(France) M Racing-YMR	Report
8	Race of Germany		(Hungary) Norbert Michelisz	(Argentina) Esteban Guerrieri	(Germany) ALL-INKL.COM Münnich Motorsport	Report
9	Race of Germany	(Sweden) Thed Björk	(Belgium) Frédéric Vervisch	(Sweden) Thed Björk	(France) M Racing-YMR	Report
10	Race of the Netherlands	(United Kingdom) Robert Huff	(France) Yann Ehrlacher	(France) Yann Ehrlacher	(Germany) ALL-INKL.COM Munnich Motorsport	Report
11	Race of the Netherlands		(France) Jean-Karl Vernay	(France) Aurélien Comte	(Belgium) DG Sport Compétition	Report
12	Race of the Netherlands	(France) Jean-Karl Vernay	(France) Jean-Karl Vernay	(France) Jean-Karl Vernay	(Luxembourg) Audi Sport Leopard Lukoil Team WRT	Report
13	Race of Portugal	(United Kingdom) Robert Huff	(Italy) Gabriele Tarquini	(France) Yvan Muller	(France) M Racing-YMR	Report
14	Race of Portugal		(Sweden) Thed Björk	(Slovakia) Maťo Homola	(Belgium) DG Sport Compétition	Report
15	Race of Portugal	(Sweden) Thed Björk	(Sweden) Thed Björk	(Sweden) Thed Björk	(France) M Racing-YMR	Report
16	Race of Slovakia	(Italy) Gabriele Tarquini	(Spain) Pepe Oriola	(Spain) Pepe Oriola	(Spain) Team Oscaro by Campos Racing	Report
17	Race of Slovakia		(Italy) Gabriele Tarquini	(Italy) Gabriele Tarquini	(Italy) BRC Racing Team	Report
18	Race of Slovakia	(Hungary) Norbert Michelisz	(Hungary) Norbert Michelisz	(Hungary) Norbert Michelisz	(Italy) BRC Racing Team	Report
19	Race of China – Ningbo	(Sweden) Thed Björk	(Sweden) Thed Björk	(Sweden) Thed Björk	(France) M Racing-YMR	Report
20	Race of China – Ningbo		(France) Yvan Muller	(France) Yvan Muller	(France) M Racing-YMR	Report
21	Race of China – Ningbo	(Sweden) Thed Björk	(Sweden) Thed Björk	(Sweden) Thed Björk	(France) M Racing-YMR	Report
22	Race of China – Wuhan	(France) Jean-Karl Vernay	(France) Jean-Karl Vernay	(France) Jean-Karl Vernay	(Luxembourg) Audi Sport Leopard Lukoil Team WRT	Report
23	Race of China – Wuhan		(Morocco) Mehdi Bennani	(Morocco) Mehdi Bennani	(France) Sébastien Loeb Racing	Report
24	Race of China – Wuhan	(United Kingdom) Gordon Shedden	(Belgium) Frédéric Vervisch	(United Kingdom) Gordon Shedden	(Luxembourg) Audi Sport Leopard Lukoil Team WRT	Report
25	Race of Japan	(France) Aurélien Comte	(Italy) Kevin Ceccon	(Italy) Kevin Ceccon	(Italy) Team Mulsanne	Report
26	Race of Japan		(Spain) Pepe Oriola	(United Kingdom) Robert Huff	(France) Sébastien Loeb Racing	Report
27	Race of Japan	(Italy) Kevin Ceccon	(Italy) Gabriele Tarquini	(Italy) Gabriele Tarquini	(Italy) BRC Racing Team	Report
28	Guia Race of Macau	(United Kingdom) Robert Huff	(United Kingdom) Robert Huff	(France) Jean-Karl Vernay	(Luxembourg) Audi Sport Leopard Lukoil Team WRT	Report
29	Guia Race of Macau		(United Kingdom) Robert Huff	(Belgium) Frédéric Vervisch	(Belgium) Audi Sport Team Comtoyou	Report
30	Guia Race of Macau	(United Kingdom) Robert Huff	(France) Yann Ehrlacher	(Argentina) Esteban Guerrieri	(Germany) ALL-INKL.COM Münnich Motorsport	Report

== Championship standings ==
=== Drivers' championship ===
Championship points were awarded on the results of each race at each event as follows:

Position	**1st**	**2nd**	**3rd**	**4th**	**5th**	**6th**	**7th**	**8th**	**9th**	**10th**
Race 1	27	20	17	14	12	10	8	6	4	2
Second Qualifying	5	4	3	2	1					
Race 2	25	18	15	12	10	8	6	4	2	1
Race 3	30	23	19	16	13	10	7	4	2	1

(key)

Pos.	Driver	MAR (Morocco)			HUN (Hungary)			GER (Germany)			NLD (Netherlands)			PRT (Portugal)			SVK (Slovakia)			NIN (China)			WUH (China)			JPN (Japan)			MAC (Macau)			Pts.
1	(Italy) Gabriele Tarquini	1	19†	**1**^{1}	6	4	1^{2}	Ret	Ret	DNS	Ret	19	18	4	9	2^{3}	**3**	1	Ret	4	Ret	2^{4}	17	NC	13	8	5	1^{2}	4	Ret	10	306
2	(France) Yvan Muller	11	9	2^{2}	4	3	3	1	4	3^{4}	Ret	24†	Ret	1	2	11	12	3	Ret^{4}	7	1	Ret	15	9	Ret	3	10	21†	2	3	4	303
3	(Argentina) Esteban Guerrieri	6	8	14	2	5	22^{3}	Ret	1	8	6	7	4^{5}	2	Ret	13	Ret	8	Ret^{3}	2	3	Ret^{3}	7	13	4^{5}	4	Ret	18	6	5	1^{2}	267
4	(Hungary) Norbert Michelisz	Ret	7	5^{3}	**3**	6	**2**^{1}	4	5	Ret^{3}	Ret	23	22†	Ret	5	3^{2}	23†	6	**1**^{1}	Ret	11	5^{2}	Ret	14	14	11	3	9	5	Ret	3^{3}	246
5	(France) Jean-Karl Vernay	4	1	9	8	10	10	5	7	7	5	Ret	**1**^{1}	5	4	10	2	NC	Ret	Ret	Ret	12	**1**	5	15^{4}	6	14	10	1	Ret	22†^{4}	245
6	(Spain) Pepe Oriola	18†	3	10	16	Ret	19	8	2	6	23†	4	10	3	3	4^{4}	1	4	8	13	9	7	2	4	6	10	2	19	7	Ret	6	245
7	(Sweden) Thed Björk	**2**	5	3^{4}	9	12	9	**2**	Ret	**1**^{1}	14	16	15	Ret	10	**1**^{1}	13	10	4	**1**	7	**1**^{1}	12	Ret	10	Ret	12	8	11	Ret	8	242
8	(United Kingdom) Robert Huff	3	18	7	5	1	8	3	Ret	Ret	**3**	8	2^{2}	**Ret**	DNS	DNS	19	Ret	13	6	5	6^{5}	14	10	Ret	23	1	6	**3**	24	**2**^{1}	242
9	(Belgium) Frédéric Vervisch	Ret	Ret	Ret	13	17	18	Ret	3	2^{2}	Ret	9	3^{4}	10	17	6	Ret	7	3	3	6	4	4	6	2^{2}	9	11	7	12	1	13	228
10	(France) Yann Ehrlacher	7	4	4^{5}	1	Ret	4^{4}	19	6	Ret^{5}	1	2	6	Ret	7	7^{5}	6	9	14	8	18†	19	18	15	12	Ret	9	Ret^{4}	14	6	5^{5}	204
11	(France) Aurélien Comte	8	Ret	DNS	17	16	13	18	13	15	2	1	7	6	Ret	DNS	4	13	2^{2}	16	Ret	16	5	2	Ret	**2**	7	2^{3}	20	12	16	191
12	(Morocco) Mehdi Bennani	9	2	6	10	7	17	13	10	9	8	5	8	Ret	DNS	DNS	21	Ret	Ret	5	2	10	13	1	9	5	8	4^{5}	15	10	Ret	155
13	(United Kingdom) Gordon Shedden	5	11	18†	18	15	12	7	18	13	4	6	5^{3}	9	6	17†	17	15	Ret	14	14	13	3	Ret	**1**^{1}	18	18	16	Ret	14	Ret	122
14	(Italy) Kevin Ceccon																16	11	6	12	12	14	6	11	8	1	6	**3**^{1}	Ret	4	7	102
15	(France) Nathanaël Berthon	12	15	Ret	11	14	16	20	8	5	9	15	11	8	Ret	Ret	10	12	Ret	Ret	8	8	8	3	5	12	17	20†	18	7	9	79
16	(Belgium) Denis Dupont	13	DNS	DNS	22	21	21	12	11	12	11	11	12	Ret	Ret	14	8	17	15†	9	4	3	10	8	3^{3}	16	13	Ret	22	15	15	69
17	(France) Aurélien Panis	Ret	14	16	15	20	Ret	11	12	11	10	Ret	13	16†	8	9	9	Ret	10	10	10	9	9	7	11	13	4	5	16	9	Ret	55
18	(Slovakia) Mat'o Homola	Ret	12	13	20	NC	20	14	14	16	18	18	16	12	1	5	14	16	11	17	16	18	Ret	Ret	Ret	7	20	15	10	17	12	48
19	(Belgium) Benjamin Lessennes	15	Ret	17	14	8	5^{5}	10	Ret	4	19	12	Ret	7	Ret	8	20	DSQ	DSQ													48
20	(Hungary) Dániel Nagy				7	2	6																									36
21	(United Kingdom) James Thompson	14	6	8	12	NC	7	22	DSQ	19	12	3	9	Ret	DNS	DNS																36
22	(Germany) Timo Scheider																			11	19	11	19	Ret	Ret	19	16	13	8	2	Ret	24
23	(Netherlands) Tom Coronel	21†	10	12	Ret	19	Ret	9	9	10	7	14	Ret	Ret	15	Ret	7	DSQ	DSQ	15	15	17	Ret	Ret	17†	17	19	14	13	16	14	24
24	(Italy) Fabrizio Giovanardi	19	13	19†	23†	23	Ret	15	Ret	14	22†	Ret	DNS	11	11	Ret	5	14	7	18	13	Ret	Ret	16	Ret							19
25	(Hungary) Norbert Nagy	16	16	15	Ret	11	11	21	17	17	17	20	17	14	13	Ret	11	2	Ret	Ret	20†	15	NC	Ret	16	22	21	17	23	23	20	18
26	(France) John Filippi	10	17	11	NC	13	Ret	16	Ret	20	15	10	14	Ret	12	16†	18	5	Ret^{5}	Ret	Ret	20†	16	Ret	DNS	20	22†	12	Ret	11	23†	14
27	(Czech Republic) Petr Fulín																15	20	5													13
28	(Germany) René Rast							6	Ret	DNS																						10
29	(Italy) Luigi Ferrara																									14	23†	NC	9	8	Ret	8
30	(China) Ma Qing Hua																			19	17	DNS	11	12	7				Ret	13	11	7
31	(Hungary) Zsolt Szabó	17	Ret	Ret	21	9	Ret	Ret	Ret	DNS	16	17	Ret	15	Ret	DNS	24†	19	9	Ret	Ret	21†	20	17	Ret	21	Ret	DNS	DNQ	22	24†	4
32	(Portugal) Tiago Monteiro																									15	15	11				0
33	(Portugal) Edgar Florindo													13	14	12																0
34	(Slovakia) Andrej Studenič																22	18	12													0
35	(Italy) Gianni Morbidelli	20†	Ret	Ret	Ret	22	14	Ret	15	Ret	13	13	21	Ret	DNS	DNS																0
36	(Hungary) Attila Tassi				19	18	15																									0
37	(Portugal) José Rodrigues													Ret	16	15†																0
38	(Switzerland) Kris Richard							17	16	18																						0
39	(Macau) Kevin Tse																												Ret	18	17	0
40	(Macau) Filipe de Souza																												17	19	19	0
41	(Macau) André Couto																												21	20	18	0
42	(Netherlands) Bernhard van Oranje-Nassau										21	21	19																			0
43	(Macau) Lo Kai Fung																												19	21	21	0
44	(Netherlands) Michael Verhagen										20	22	20																			0
	(Macau) Lam Kam San																												DNQ	DNQ	DNQ	0
	(Macau) Rui Valente																												DNQ	DNQ	DNQ	0
Pos.	Driver	MAR (Morocco)			HUN (Hungary)			GER (Germany)			NLD (Netherlands)			PRT (Portugal)			SVK (Slovakia)			NIN (China)			WUH (China)			JPN (Japan)			MAC (Macau)			Pts.

Bold – Pole

Italics – Fastest Lap

† – Drivers did not finish the race, but were classified as they completed over 75% of the race distance.

=== Teams' championship ===
(key)

Pos.	Team	MAR (Morocco)			HUN (Hungary)			GER (Germany)			NLD (Netherlands)			PRT (Portugal)			SVK (Slovakia)			NIN (China)			WUH (China)			JPN (Japan)			MAC (Macau)			Pts.
1	(France) M Racing-YMR	11	9	2^{2}	4	3	3	1	4	3^{4}	Ret	24†	Ret	1	2	11	12	3	Ret^{4}	7	1	Ret	15	9	Ret	3	10	21	2	3	4	562
1	(France) M Racing-YMR	**2**	5	3^{4}	9	12	9	**2**	Ret	**1**^{1}	14	16	15	Ret	10	**1**^{1}	13	10	4	**1**	7	**1**^{1}	12	Ret	10	Ret	12	8	11	Ret	8	562
2	(Italy) BRC Racing Team	1	19†	**1**^{1}	6	4	1^{2}	Ret	Ret	DNS	Ret	19	18	4	9	2^{3}	**3**	1	Ret	4	Ret	2^{4}	17	Ret	13	8	5	1^{2}	4	Ret	10	559
2	(Italy) BRC Racing Team	Ret	7	5^{3}	**3**	6	**2**^{1}	4	5	Ret^{3}	Ret	23	22†	Ret	5	3^{2}	23†	6	**1**^{1}	Ret	11	5^{2}	Ret	14	14	11	3	9	5	Ret	3^{3}	559
3	(Germany) ALL-INKL.COM Münnich Motorsport	7	4	4^{5}	1	Ret	4^{4}	19	6	Ret^{5}	1	2	6	Ret	7	7^{5}	6	9	14	8	18†	19	18	15	12	Ret	9	Ret^{4}	14	6	5^{5}	481
3	(Germany) ALL-INKL.COM Münnich Motorsport	6	8	14	2	5	22^{3}	Ret	1	8	6	7	4^{5}	2	Ret	13	Ret	8	Ret^{3}	2	3	Ret^{3}	7	13	4^{5}	4	DNS	18	6	5	1^{2}	481
4	(France) Sébastien Loeb Racing	3	18	7	5	1	8	3	Ret	Ret	**3**	8	2^{2}	**Ret**	DNS	DNS	19	Ret	13	6	5	6^{5}	14	10	Ret	23†	1	6	**3**	24	**2**^{1}	412
4	(France) Sébastien Loeb Racing	9	2	6	10	7	17	13	10	9	8	5	8	Ret	DNS	DNS	21	Ret	Ret	5	2	10	13	**1**	9	5	8	4^{5}	15	10	Ret	412
5	(Luxembourg) Audi Sport Leopard Lukoil Team WRT	4	1	9	8	10	10	5	7	7	5	Ret	**1**^{1}	5	4	10	2	Ret	Ret	Ret	Ret	12	**1**	5	15^{4}	6	14	10	1	Ret	22†^{4}	381
5	(Luxembourg) Audi Sport Leopard Lukoil Team WRT	5	11	18†	18	15	12	7	18	13	4	6	5^{3}	9	6	17	17	15	Ret	14	14	13	3	Ret	**1**^{1}	18	18	16	Ret	14	Ret	381
6	(Belgium) Audi Sport Team Comtoyou	Ret	Ret	Ret	13	17	18	Ret	3	2^{2}	Ret	9	3^{4}	10	17	6	Ret	7	3	3	6	4	4	6	2^{2}	9	11	7	12	1	13	300
6	(Belgium) Audi Sport Team Comtoyou	13	DNS	DNS	22	21	21	12	11	12	11	11	12	Ret	Ret	14	8	17	15†	9	4	3	10	8	3^{3}	16	13	Ret	22	15	15	300
7	(Spain) Team Oscaro by Campos Racing	18†	3	10	16	Ret	19	8	2	6	23†	4	10	3	3	4^{4}	1	4	8	13	9	7	2	4	6	10	2	19	7	Ret	6	272
7	(Spain) Team Oscaro by Campos Racing	10	17	11	Ret	13	Ret	16	Ret	20	15	10	14	Ret	12	16	18	5	Ret^{5}	Ret	Ret	20	16	Ret	DNS	20	22	12	Ret	11	23†	272
8	(Belgium) DG Sport Compétition	8	Ret	DNS	17	16	13	18	13	15	2	1	7	6	Ret	DNS	4	13	2^{2}	16	Ret	16	5	2	Ret	**2**	7	2^{3}	20	12	16	242
8	(Belgium) DG Sport Compétition	Ret	12	13	20	NC	20	14	14	16	18	18	16	12	1	5	14	16	11	17	16	18	Ret	Ret	Ret	7	20	15	10	17	12	242
9	(Belgium) Comtoyou Racing	12	15	Ret	11	14	16	20	8	5	9	15	11	8	Ret	Ret	10	12	Ret	Ret	8	8	8	3	5	12	17	20†	18	7	9	144
9	(Belgium) Comtoyou Racing	Ret	14	16	15	20	Ret	11	12	11	10	Ret	13	16†	8	9	9	Ret	10	10	10	9	9	7	11	13	4	5	16	9	Ret	144
10	(Italy) Team Mulsanne	19	13	19†	23†	23	Ret	15	Ret	14	22†	Ret	DNS	11	11	Ret	5	14	7	18	13	Ret	Ret	16	Ret	14	23†	NC	9	8	Ret	142
10	(Italy) Team Mulsanne	20†	Ret	Ret	Ret	22	14	Ret	15	Ret	13	13	21	Ret	DNS	DNS	16	11	6	12	12	14	6	11	8	1	6	**3**^{1}	Ret	4	7	142
11	(Belgium) Boutsen Ginion Racing	15	Ret	17	14	8	5^{5}	10	Ret	4	19	12	Ret	7	Ret	8	20	DSQ	DSQ	19	17	DNS	11	12	7	15	15	11	Ret	13	11	86
11	(Belgium) Boutsen Ginion Racing	21†	10	12	Ret	19	Ret	9	9	10	7	14	Ret	Ret	15	Ret	7	DSQ	DSQ	15	15	17	Ret	Ret	17	17	19	14	13	16	14	86
12	(Hungary) Zengo Motorsport	17	Ret	Ret	21	9	Ret	Ret	Ret	DNS	16	17	Ret	Ret	21	DNS	Ret	19	9	Ret	Ret	21	20	17	Ret	21	Ret	DNS	DNQ	22	24†	29
12	(Hungary) Zengo Motorsport	16	16	15	Ret	11	11	21	17	17	17	20	17	14	13	Ret	11	2	Ret	Ret	20	15	Ret	Ret	16	22	21	17	23	23	20	29
Wildcard teams entries ineligible to score points
	(Hungary) M1RA				7	2	6																									36
	(Czech Republic) Fullin Race Academy																15	20	5													13
	(Belgium) Audi Sport Team WRT							6	Ret	DNS																						10
	(Portugal) Veloso Motorsport													13	14	12																0
	(Slovakia) Brutal Fish Racing Team																22	18	12													0
	(Hong Kong) KCMG				19	18	15																									0
	(Hong Kong) KCMG							17	16	18																						0
	(Italy) Target Competition													Ret	16	15																0
	(Hong Kong) Teamwork Motorsport																												Ret	18	17	0
	(China) Champ Motorsport																												17	19	19	0
	(China) Champ Motorsport																												DNQ	DNQ	DNQ	0
	(Macau) MacPro Racing Team																												21	20	18	0
	(Netherlands) Bas Koeten Racing										21	21	19																			0
	(Netherlands) Bas Koeten Racing										20	22	20																			0
	(China) TSRT Zuver Team																												19	21	21	0
	(Macau) PCT–IXO Models Racing Team																												DNQ	DNQ	DNQ	0
Pos.	Team	MAR (Morocco)			HUN (Hungary)			GER (Germany)			NLD (Netherlands)			PRT (Portugal)			SVK (Slovakia)			NIN (China)			WUH (China)			JPN (Japan)			MAC (Macau)			Pts.

Bold – Pole

Italics – Fastest Lap

† – Drivers did not finish the race, but were classified as they completed over 75% of the race distance.
