= Francisco Mora (racing driver) =

Portuguese racing driver (born 1996)

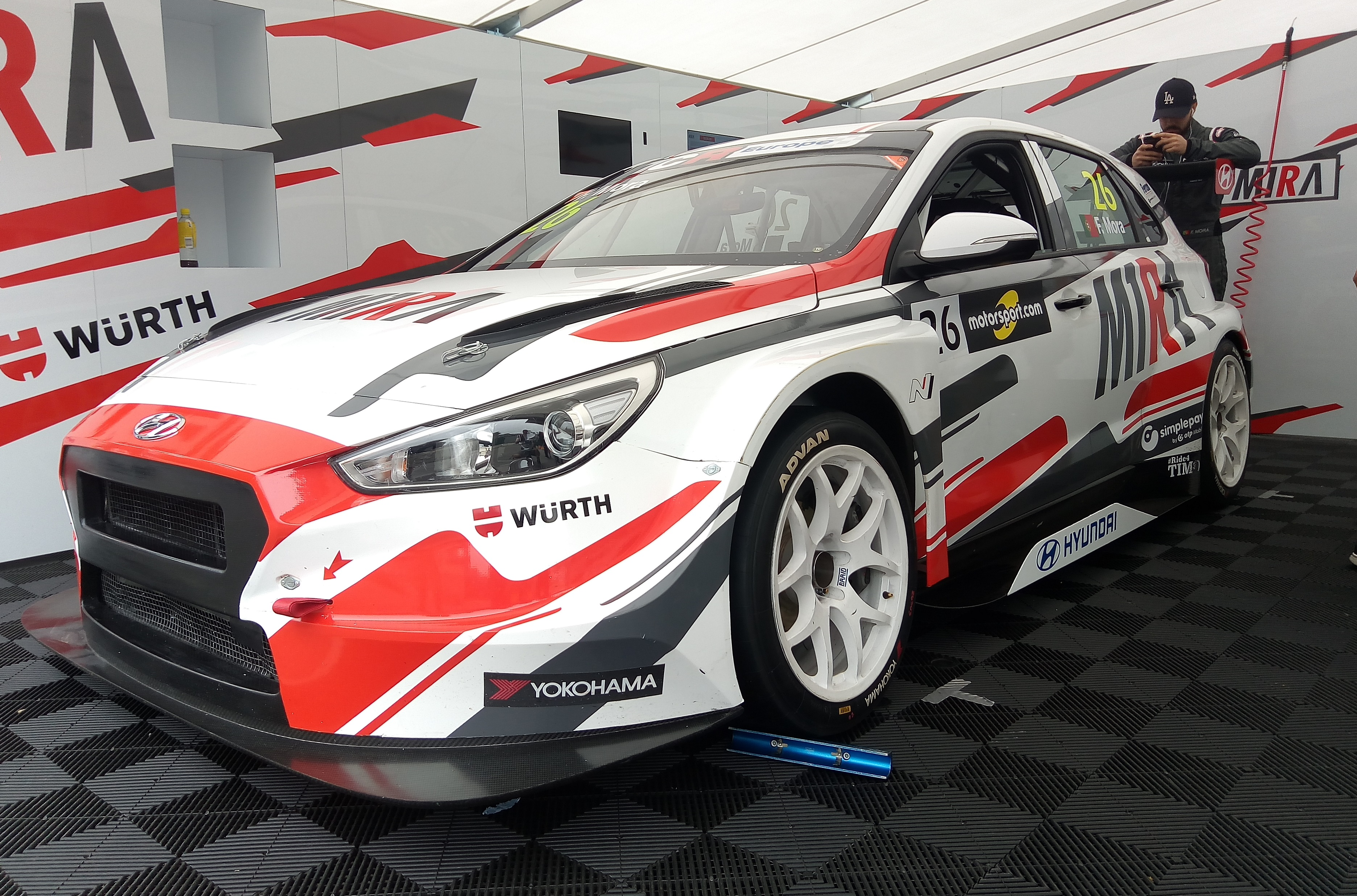
- Nationality: (Portugal) Portuguese
- Born: 26 August 1996 (age 30) Porto, Portugal

Campeonato de Portugal de Velocidade career
- Current team: Veloso Motorsport
- Categorisation: FIA Silver
- Car number: 26

Previous series
- 2015 2014 2013 2013 2011-12: TCR International Series; Blancpain Sprint Series; Formula Renault 2.0 Alps; Eurocup Formula Renault 2.0; Karting

Championship titles
- 2011: Portuguese Rotax Max Winter Cup - Junior

Francisco Mora (born 26 August 1996) is a Portuguese racing driver currently competing in the Campeonato de Portugal de Velocidade with a Cupra Leon TCR with technical assistance from Veloso Motorsport. He previously competed in the Italian GT, TCR International and Blancpain Sprint Series.

== Racing career ==
Mora began his career in 2011 in karting. He switched to the Formula Renault 2.0 Alps in 2013, he ended 14th in the Junior standings. In 2014 Mora switched to the Italian GT. In May 2015, it was announced that Mora would make his TCR International Series debut with Veloso Motorsport driving a SEAT León Cup Racer.

== Racing record ==
=== Career summary ===
Season	Series	Team	Races	Wins	Poles	F/Laps	Podiums	Points	Position
2013	Eurocup Formula Renault 2.0	Interwetten Racing	2	0	0	0	0	0	NC†
2013	Formula Renault 2.0 Alps	Interwetten.com Racing Team	14	0	0	0	0	5	26th
2014	Blancpain GT Sprint Series	Sports and You	2	0	0	0	0	0	NC
2014	Italian GT Championship - GT3	Sports and You	8	0	0	0	0	22	23rd
2015	Italian GT Championship - GT3	Sports and You	8	0	0	0	0	15	30th
2015	TCR International Series	Veloso Motorsport	2	0	0	0	0	5	30th
2015	TCR International Series	Target Competition	1	0	0	0	0	5	30th
2015	TCR Portuguese Series	Veloso Motorsport	4	4	4	4	4	108	**1st**
2016	ADAC TCR Germany Touring Car Championship	Target Junior Team	2	0	0	0	0	7	20th
2016	TCR BeNeLux Touring Car Championship	Ferry Monster Autosport	3	0	0	0	1	31‡	31st‡
2016	TCR International Series	Baporo Motorsport	2	0	0	0	0	3	30th
2016	Campeonato Nacional de Velocidade Turismos - TCR	Veloso Motorsport	16	8	4	10	12	49	6th
2016	TCR Trophy Europe	Veloso Motorsport	2	0	0	0	0	12	34th
2017	TCR Ibérico Touring Car Series	Veloso Motorsport	7	4	3	2	6	120	4th
2017	TCR Spain Touring Car Championship	Veloso Motorsport	6	4	3	2	6	113	**1st**
2017	TCR Portugal Touring Car Championship	Veloso Motorsport	11	7	4	4	10	251	**1st**
2018	TCR Europe Touring Car Series	M1RA	7	1	0	0	1	44	10th
2018	Campeonato Nacional de Velocidade Turismos	Veloso Motorsport	2	0	1	0	1	18	10th
2019	TCR Europe Touring Car Series	Veloso Motorsport	2	0	0	0	0	13	32nd
2019	TCR Ibérico Touring Car Series	Veloso Motorsport	7	4	?	?	4	112	**1st**
2023	Porsche Sprint Challenge Ibérica - Pro-Am	Veloso Motorsport	12	9	8	8	12	282	**1st**
2025	Supercars Endurance Series - GT4	Toyota GR Caetano Portugal							
2026	GT4 European Series - Pro-Am	Toyota Gazoo Racing Caetano Portugal							

† As Mora was a guest driver, he was ineligible to score points.

‡ Team standings

=== Complete Eurocup Formula Renault 2.0 results ===
(key) (Races in bold indicate pole position; races in italics indicate fastest lap)

Year	Entrant	1	2	3	4	5	6	7	8	9	10	11	12	13	14	DC	Points
2013	Interwetten Racing	ALC; 1	ALC; 2	SPA; 1	SPA; 2	MSC; 1	MSC; 2	RBR; 1	RBR; 2	HUN; 1 Ret	HUN; 2; 29	LEC; 1	LEC; 2	CAT; 1	CAT; 2	NC†	0

† As Mora was a guest driver, he was ineligible for points

=== Complete Formula Renault 2.0 Alps Series results ===
(key) (Races in bold indicate pole position; races in italics indicate fastest lap)

Year	Team	1	2	3	4	5	6	7	8	9	10	11	12	13	14	Pos	Points
2013	Interwetten.com Racing Team	VLL; 1; 15	VLL; 2; 13	IMO1; 1 Ret	IMO1; 2 Ret	SPA; 1; 10	SPA; 2 Ret	MNZ; 1; 11	MNZ; 2; 8	MIS; 1; 28	MIS; 2 Ret	MUG; 1; 27	MUG; 2; 20	IMO2; 1; 24	IMO2; 2; 18	26th	5

=== Complete TCR International Series results ===
(key) (Races in bold indicate pole position) (Races in italics indicate fastest lap)

Year	Team	Car	1	2	3	4	5	6	7	8	9	10	11	12	13	14	15	16	17	18	19	20	21	22	DC	Points
2015	Veloso Motorsport	SEAT León Cup Racer	SEP; 1	SEP; 2	SHA; 1	SHA; 2	VAL; 1	VAL; 2	ALG; 1; 10	ALG; 2; 8	MNZ; 1	MNZ; 2	SAL; 1	SAL; 2	SOC; 1	SOC; 2	RBR; 1	RBR; 2	MRN; 1	MRN; 2	CHA; 1	CHA; 2	MAC; 1	MAC; 2	30th	5
2016	Baporo Motorsport	SEAT León Cup Racer	BHR; 1	BHR; 2	EST; 1; 10	EST; 2; 9	SPA; 1	SPA; 2	IMO; 1	IMO; 2	SAL; 1	SAL; 2	OSC; 1	OSC; 2	SOC; 1	SOC; 2	CHA; 1	CHA; 2	MRN; 1	MRN; 2	SEP; 1	SEP; 2	MAC; 1	MAC; 2	30th	3

=== Complete TCR Europe Series results ===
(key) (Races in bold indicate pole position) (Races in italics indicate fastest lap)

Year	Team	Car	1	2	3	4	5	6	7	8	9	10	11	12	13	14	DC	Points
2018	M1RA	Hyundai i30 N TCR	LEC; 1; 21†	LEC; 2; 4	ZAN; 1; 9	ZAN; 2; 8	SPA; 1 DNS	SPA; 2; 10	HUN; 1 Ret	HUN; 2; 1	ASS; 1	ASS; 2	MNZ; 1	MNZ; 2	CAT; 1	CAT; 2	10th	44
2019	Veloso Motorsport	CUPRA León TCR	HUN; 1	HUN; 2	HOC; 1	HOC; 2	SPA; 1	SPA; 2	RBR; 1	RBR; 2	OSC; 1	OSC; 2	CAT; 1; 9	CAT; 2; 19	MNZ; 1	MNZ; 2	32nd	13

^{†} Driver did not finish, but was classified as he completed over 75% of the race distance.
