= Vojislav Lekić =

Serbian racing driver (born 1986)

Vojislav Lekić (born 26 July 1986 in Belgrade, SFR Yugoslavia) is a Serbian racing driver, who has competed in the European Touring Car Cup. He is a former ETCC Super Production champion, having won the title in 2010.

== Career ==
He started karting in 1999. In 2003 he became champion of Serbia & Montenegro in ICA category

In 2004, he moved to car racing. Aside from the Serbian national championship, he competed in two rounds of the Italian Renault Clio Cup in 2006.

In 2009 and 2010 Vojislav became champion of Serbia in Super Production class.

In 2010, Lekić became the champion in the ETCC Super Production, winning his class in all four races he competed in, out of six total held over 3 rounds.

He has also competed in some domestic rally events in Serbia.
