= José Monroy (racing driver) =

Portuguese racing driver (born 1980)

- Nationality: Portuguese
- Born: 4 May 1980 (age 46) Lisbon, Portugal

TCR International Series career
- Debut season: 2015
- Current team: Veloso Motorsport
- Car number: 18
- Starts: 2

Previous series
- 2014 2012 2009 2007–09: SEAT León Eurocup; Portuguese GT Championship; ETCC; Portuguese Touring Car Championship

Championship titles
- 2008: Portuguese Touring Car Championship

José Monroy (born 4 May 1980) is a Portuguese racing driver currently competing in the TCR International Series. He previously competed in the SEAT León Eurocup and European Touring Car Cup.

== Racing career ==
Monroy began his career in 2007 in the Portuguese Touring Car Championship, he won the championship in 2008. He switched to the European Touring Car Cup in 2009, he ended eighth in the standings. In 2014 Monroy switched to the SEAT León Eurocup. In May 2015, it was announced that Monroy would make his TCR International Series debut with Veloso Motorsport driving a SEAT León Cup Racer.

== Racing record ==
=== Complete TCR International Series results ===
(key) (Races in bold indicate pole position) (Races in italics indicate fastest lap)

Year	Team	Car	1	2	3	4	5	6	7	8	9	10	11	12	13	14	15	16	17	18	19	20	21	22	DC	Points
2015	Veloso Motorsport	SEAT León Cup Racer	MYS; 1	MYS; 2	CHN; 1	CHN; 2	ESP; 1	ESP; 2	POR; 1; 8	POR; 2; 5	ITA; 1	ITA; 2	AUT; 1	AUT; 2	RUS; 1	RUS; 2	RBR; 1	RBR; 2	SIN; 1	SIN; 2	THA; 1	THA; 2	MAC; 1	MAC; 2	20th	14
