= Circuito Internacional de Vila Real =

Street circuit in Vila Real, Portugal

Circuito International de Vila Real
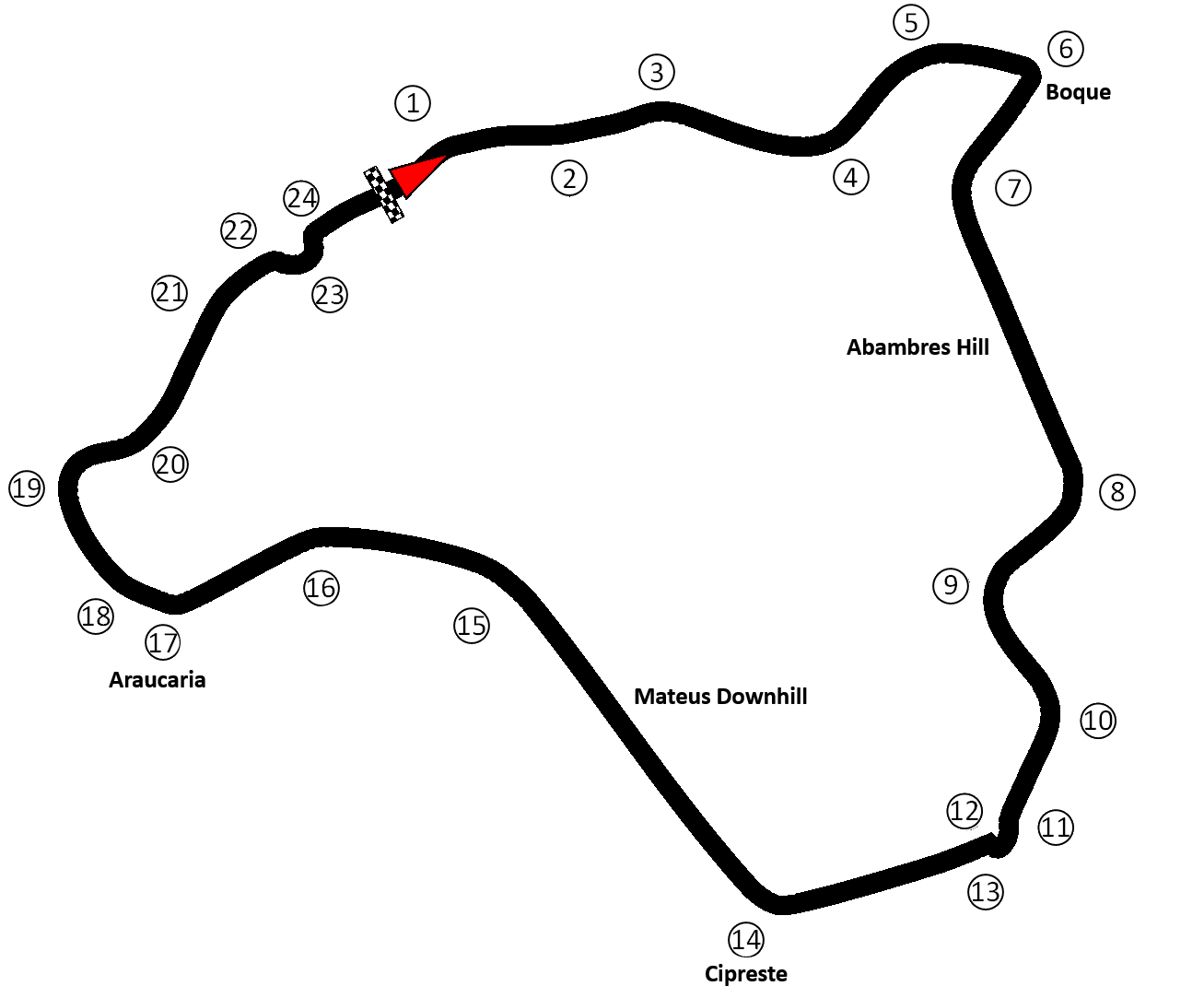
- Urban Circuit (2007–present)
- Location: Vila Real
- Coordinates: 41°18′01″N 7°43′52″W
- FIA Grade: 3R
- Opened: 15 June 1931; 95 years ago Re-opened: 5 October 2007; 19 years ago
- Closed: 1991
- Major events: Current: TCR World Tour (2025–present); Former: WTCR Race of Portugal (2018–2019, 2022); WTCC Race of Portugal (2015–2017); Classic Endurance Racing (2024); ETC (2016–2017)
- Website: https://www.circuitodevilareal.pt/

Urban Circuit (2007–present)
- Length: 4.785 km (2.973 mi)
- Turns: 24
- Race lap record: 1:57.929 ( (United Kingdom) Robert Huff, Citroën C-Elysée WTCC, 2017, TC1)

Old Urban Circuit (1958–1991)
- Length: 6.925 km (4.303 mi)
- Race lap record: 2:19.920 ( (Portugal) Carlos Gaspar, Lola T292, 1973, Group 5)

Original Urban Circuit (1931–1953)
- Length: 7.200 km (4.474 mi)
- Race lap record: 3:51.750 ( (Italy) Giovanni Bracco, Ferrari 212 Export Vignale Barchetta, 1951, Sports car racing)

The Circuito Internacional de Vila Real is a 4.785 km (2.973 mi) temporary street circuit in Vila Real, Portugal. This circuit was used for car and motorbike races.

== The circuit ==
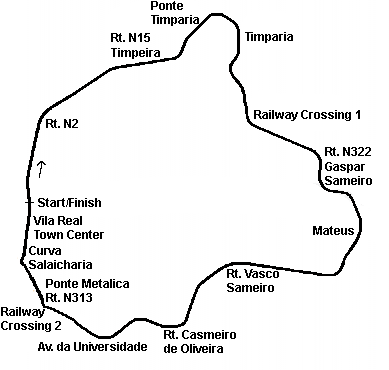
1958 urban circuit layout of the Vila Real Circuit (1958–1991)

The circuit layout has suffered several changes through the times. Started as a 7.370 km (4.580 mi) street circuit in 1931, it was later reduced to a 6.925 km (4.303 mi) version in the 1950s, which lasted until 1991, with small chances in some corner, chicanes introduction and start/finish line being moved forward.

After a deadly accident in 1991, no race would take place in this circuit until 2007, after a length reduction to a 4.785 km (2.973 mi) long renovated layout. From the original circuit, remains the up and downhill section, from turn 6 (Boque), until turn 19, that drivers used to turn left. This section also gives the track big elevation changes.

It is often considered a challenging track due to high speeds reaching up to 170kph, and drivers being very close to the barriers.

== Lap records ==
As of July 2026, the fastest official race lap records at the Circuito Internacional de Vila Real are listed as:

Category	Time	Driver	Vehicle	Event
Urban Circuit (2007–present): 4.785 km (2.973 mi)
TC1	1:57.929	Robert Huff	Citroën C-Elysée WTCC	2017 FIA WTCC Race of Portugal
TCR Touring Car	2:00.313	Yann Ehrlacher	Geely Preface TCR	2026 Vila Real TCR World Tour round
GT4	2:01.453	Rodrigo Almeida	Toyota GR Supra GT4 EVO2	2026 Vila Real CPV round
Super 2000	2:04.903	Petr Fulín	SEAT León Cup Racer	2016 Vila Real ETC round
Porsche Carrera Cup	2:06.525	Rui Miritta	Porsche 911 GT3 (991 I) Cup	2025 Vila Real CPV round
Super 1600	2:19.656	Niklas Mackschin	Ford Fiesta 1.6 16V	2016 Vila Real ETC round
Old Urban Circuit (1958–1991): 6.925 km (4.303 mi)
Group 5 sports prototype	2:19.920	Carlos Gaspar	Lola T292	1973 Vila Real International race
Group 5 sports car	2:27.240	Mário Cabral	Porsche 917K	1971 Vila Real sports car race
Group 4	2:28.900	Frank Gardner	Lola T70 Mk.IIIB GT	1969 Vila Real 6 Hours
Formula Three	2:33.620	Manfred Mohr	Tecno TF/68	1968 Vila Real European F3 round
Group 5 special production	2:40.900	Jorge Petiz	Porsche 935 K2	1981 Vila Real Group 5 race
Sports car racing	2:55.000	Stirling Moss	Maserati 300S	1958 Vila Real sports car race
Original Urban Circuit (1933–1953): 7.200 km (4.474 mi)
Sports car racing	3:51.750	Giovanni Bracco	Ferrari 212 Export Vignale Barchetta	1951 Vila Real sports car race

== Winners ==
Season	Edition	Driver	Car/Motor	Class
1931	1st	(Portugal) Gaspar Sameiro (Portugal) Ercílio Barbosa	Ford A	
1932	2nd	(Portugal) Vasco Sameiro	Invicta	
1933	3rd	(Portugal) Vasco Sameiro	Alfa Romeo 8C 2300 Monza	
1934	4th	(Portugal) António Guedes de Herédia	Bugatti T35B	
1935	Not held			
1936	5th	(Portugal) Adolfo Ferreirinha	Ford V8	
1937	6th	(Portugal) Casimiro de Oliveira	Jaguar SS100	
1938	7th	(Portugal) Vasco Sameiro	Alfa Romeo 8C 2300 Monza	
1939-48	Not held			
1949	8th	(Portugal) José Cabral	Allard K1	
1950	9th	(Italy) Piero Carini	OSCA	Sport
1951	10th	(Italy) Giovanni Bracco	Ferrari 212 Export Barchetta	Sport
1952	11th	(Italy) Antonio Stagnoli	Ferrari 225 S Spider	Sport
1953-57	Not held			
1958	12th	(United Kingdom) Stirling Moss	Maserati 300S	Sport
1966	13th	(United Kingdom) John Miles	Ford Cortina Lotus	Touring car
1966	13th	(United Kingdom) John Fenning	Brabham BT18 - Ford/Cosworth	Formula Three
1967	14th	(United Kingdom) Mike de Udy	Lola T70 MkII Chevrolet	Sport
1967	14th	(United Kingdom) Chris Williams	Brabham BT21 - Ford/Holbay	Formula Three
1968	15th	(United Kingdom) Mike de Udy	Lola T70 MkII Chevrolet	Sport
1968	15th	(Sweden) Reine Wisell	Tecno 68 - Ford/Novamotor	Formula Three
1969	16th	(United Kingdom) Chris Craft (United Kingdom) David Piper	Porsche 908/2	6 hour/Endurance
1970	17th	(Belgium) Teddy Pilette (Belgium) Gustave Gosselin	Lola T70 MkII Chevrolet	500 km/Endurance
1971	18th	(Spain) Jorge Bagration	Porsche 908/2	Sports
1972	19th	(France) Claude Swietlick	Lola T290	Sports
1973	20th	(Portugal) Carlos Gaspar	Lola T292	Sports
1979	21st	(Portugal) Robert Giannone	Porsche 935	
1980	22nd	(Portugal) António Barros	Porsche 935	
1981	23rd	(Portugal) Robert Giannone	Porsche 935	
1982	24th	(Portugal) Mário Silva	Ford Escort RS 1800 Mk 2	
1983	25th	(Portugal) António Taveira	BMW M1	
...	...	...	...	...
2007	40th	(Portugal) Francisco Carvalho	SEAT Leon Supercopa	PTCC
2007	40th	(Portugal) César Campaniço	BMW 320si	PTCC
2007	40th	(Portugal) Pedro Salvador	Juno SSE	Sports prototypes
2008	41st	(Portugal) César Campaniço	BMW 320si	PTCC
2008	41st	(Portugal) Francisco Carvalho	SEAT Leon Supercopa	PTCC
2008	41st	(Portugal) Pedro Salvador	Juno SSE	GT & Sports prototypes
2008	41st	(Portugal) Pedro Salvador	Juno SSE	GT & Sports prototypes
2009	42nd	(Portugal) César Campaniço	BMW 320si	PTCC
2009	42nd	(Portugal) João Figueiredo	Peugeot 407 S200	PTCC
2009	42nd	(Portugal) Francisco Martins	Porsche 997	GT & Sports prototypes
2009	42nd	(Portugal) Francisco Martins	Porsche 997	GT & Sports prototypes
2010	43rd	(Portugal) José Monroy	Mitsubishi Lancer Evo IX	PTCC
2010	43rd	(Portugal) José Monroy	Mitsubishi Lancer Evo IX	PTCC
2010	43rd	(Portugal) Pedro Salvador	Juno SSE	Sports prototypes
2010	43rd	(Portugal) César Campaniço (Portugal) João Figueiredo	Audi R8 LMS	GT
2014	44th	(Portugal) Pedro Salvador (Portugal) Carlos Vieira	Tatuus PY012	Sports prototypes
2014	44th	(Portugal) Pedro Salvador (Portugal) Carlos Vieira	Tatuus PY012	Sports prototypes
2015	45th	(Argentina) José María López	(France) Citroën	WTCC
2015	45th	(China) Ma Qing Hua	(France) Citroën	WTCC
2016	46th	(Netherlands) Tom Coronel	(United States) Chevrolet	WTCC
2016	46th	(Portugal) Tiago Monteiro	(Japan) Honda	WTCC
2017	47th	(Morocco) Mehdi Bennani	(France) Citroën	WTCC
2017	47th	(Hungary) Norbert Michelisz	(Japan) Honda	WTCC
2017	48th			
2018	49th	(France) Yvan Muller	(South Korea) Hyundai	WTCR
2018	49th	(Slovakia) Mat'o Homola	(France) Peugeot	WTCR
2018	49th	(Sweden) Thed Björk	(South Korea) Hyundai	WTCR
2019	50th	(Portugal) Tiago Monteiro	(Japan) Honda	WTCR
2019	50th	(Spain) Mikel Azcona	(Spain) CUPRA	WTCR
2019	50th	(Hungary) Norbert Michelisz	(South Korea) Hyundai	WTCR
2022	51st	(Uruguay) Santiago Urrutia	(Sweden) Lynk & Co	WTCR
2022	51st	(United Kingdom) Robert Huff	(Spain) CUPRA	WTCR
2023	52ª	(Portugal) José Carlos Pires (Portugal) Francisco Abreu	BMW M4 GT4 (G82)	Campeonato de Portugal de Velocidade
2023	52ª	(Portugal) Patrick Cunha (Portugal) Jorge Rodrigues	Audi R8 LMS GT4	Campeonato de Portugal de Velocidade

International Event
