= Circuito Vasco Sameiro =

Motorsport racing track in Palmeira, Portugal

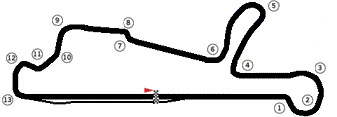
- Bike Circuit (1993–present)
- Location: Palmeira, Portugal
- Coordinates: 41°35′10.93″N 8°26′41.89″W
- Broke ground: 1990
- Opened: 1993
- Major events: European Touring Car Cup (2009–2010); Karting World Championship (2000, 2005); FIM Superbike European Championship (1995–1996)
- Website: http://www.camminho.com/

Car Circuit (2002–present)
- Length: 3.021 km (1.877 mi)
- Turns: 15
- Race lap record: 1:13.917 ( (Portugal) Carlos Vieira, Tatuus PY012, 2014, CN)

Bike Circuit (1993–present)
- Length: 3.021 km (1.877 mi)
- Turns: 15
- Race lap record: 1:19.045 ( (Portugal) Pedro Baptista, Honda RVF750 RC45, 1995, SBK)

The Circuito de Velocidade Vasco Sameiro (also known as Circuit of Braga) is a racing circuit located 6 km (3.7 mi) north of Braga, Portugal at Palmeira.

It was constructed in 1990 around the local aerodrome and is 3.021 km (1.877 mi) long. The track runs in an anticlockwise direction. The circuit is owned by the Clube Automóvel do Minho. There is a karting track adjacent to the main track.

The karting circuit was used for the Karting World Championship in 2000 and 2005, while the auto racing circuit is used mostly for Portuguese national motorsports. In October 2009 it hosted its first international motorsports event, the fifth running of the annual European Touring Car Cup.

== Lap records ==
The fastest official race lap records at the Circuito Vasco Sameiro are listed as:

Category	Time	Driver	Vehicle	Event
Car Circuit (2002–present): 3.021 km (1.877 mi)
Group CN	1:13.917	Carlos Vieira	Tatuus PY012	2014 Braga CNV round
Super 2000	1:23.777	César Campaniço	BMW 320si	2010 Braga ETC round
Super 1600	1:39.637	Jens Löhnig	Ford Fiesta ST	2010 Braga ETC round
Bike Circuit (1993–present): 3.021 km (1.877 mi)
Superbike	1:19.045	Pedro Baptista	Honda RVF750 RC45	1995 Braga European SBK round
