= Veloso Motorsport =

Portuguese auto racing team

(Portugal) Veloso Motorsport
- Founded: 1991
- Team principal(s): Luis Veloso
- Current series: Kia GT Cup; Campeonato de Portugal de Velocidade; Campeonato de Portugal de Montanha
- Former series: TCR International Series; International GT Open; SEAT León Eurocup; GT4 European Series; British GT; Spanish GT Championship; SEAT León Supercopa Spain; European Touring Car Cup
- Noted drivers: TCR; 26. (Portugal) Francisco Mora; Kia Gt Cup; 68. (Portugal) Manuel Alves; 3. (Portugal) Francisco Carvalho
- Website: http://www.velosomotorsport.com/

Veloso Motorsport is a Portuguese auto racing team based in Póvoa de Lanhoso, Portugal. The team raced in the TCR International Series in 2015. Having previously raced in the SEAT León Eurocup & Spanish GT Championship amongst others.

== TCR International Series ==
=== SEAT León Cup Racer (2015–) ===
After having raced in the SEAT León Eurocup in 2014, the team will enter the 2015 TCR International Series season with José Monroy and Francisco Mora driving an SEAT León Cup Racer each.
