= 2018 24H TCE Series =

Touring race

The 2018 24H Touring Car Endurance Series powered by Hankook was the third season of the Touring Car Endurance Series (TCES). Creventic was the organiser and promoter of the series. The races were contested with touring cars.

== Calendar ==
Round	Event	Circuit	Date	Report
1	24H Dubai	Dubai Autodrome, Dubai, United Arab Emirates	11–13 January	Report
2	24H Silverstone	Silverstone Circuit, Northamptonshire, United Kingdom	9–11 March	Report
3	12H Imola	Autodromo Enzo e Dino Ferrari, Imola, Italy	24–26 May	Report
4	24H Portimão	Algarve International Circuit, Portimão, Portugal	6–8 July	Report
5	24H Barcelona	Circuit de Barcelona-Catalunya, Montmeló, Spain	7–9 September	Report
6	12H Spa	Circuit de Spa-Francorchamps, Spa, Belgium	12–14 October	Report
7	24H COTA	Circuit of the Americas, Austin, United States	16–18 November	Report

Race is part of the Championship of the Continents
Race is part of the European Championship
Race is part of both the Championship of the Continents and the European Championship

== Entry list ==
Team	Car	No.	Drivers	Rounds
TCR
Team Hyundai Denmark	Hyundai i30 N TCR	30	(Denmark) Jan Engelbrecht	2–3, 5, 7
Team Hyundai Denmark	Hyundai i30 N TCR	30	(Denmark) Søren Jönsson	2–3, 5, 7
Team Hyundai Denmark	Hyundai i30 N TCR	30	(Denmark) Jacob Kristensen	2
Team Hyundai Denmark	Hyundai i30 N TCR	30	(Denmark) Niels Nyboe	2, 5
Team Hyundai Denmark	Hyundai i30 N TCR	30	(Denmark) Per Poulsen	2
Team Hyundai Denmark	Hyundai i30 N TCR	30	(Denmark) Henrik Sørensen	3, 5, 7
Team Hyundai Denmark	Hyundai i30 N TCR	30	(Denmark) Thomas Sørensen	7
(United Arab Emirates) Atech - DXB	SEAT León TCR	55	(United Kingdom) Julian Griffin	1, 5
(United Arab Emirates) Atech - DXB	SEAT León TCR	55	(United Kingdom) Jonathan Simmonds	1, 5
(United Arab Emirates) Atech - DXB	SEAT León TCR	55	(United Kingdom) Colin Boyle	1
(United Arab Emirates) Atech - DXB	SEAT León TCR	55	(United Kingdom) Will Morrison	1
(United Arab Emirates) Atech - DXB	SEAT León TCR	55	(Australia) Peter England	5
(United Arab Emirates) LAP57 Motorsports	Audi RS 3 LMS TCR	57	(United Arab Emirates) Abdullah Al Hammadi	1
(United Arab Emirates) LAP57 Motorsports	Audi RS 3 LMS TCR	57	(United Arab Emirates) Mohammed Al Owais	1
(United Arab Emirates) LAP57 Motorsports	Audi RS 3 LMS TCR	57	(Sri Lanka) Ashan Silva	1
(United Arab Emirates) LAP57 Motorsports	Audi RS 3 LMS TCR	57	(United Arab Emirates) Nadir Zuhour	1
(United Kingdom) RKC/TGM Motorsport	Honda Civic Type R TCR (FK8)	99	(United Kingdom) Ricky Coomber	1
(United Kingdom) RKC/TGM Motorsport	Honda Civic Type R TCR (FK8)	99	(United Kingdom) David Drinkwater	1
(United Kingdom) RKC/TGM Motorsport	Honda Civic Type R TCR (FK8)	99	(United Kingdom) Thomas Gannon	1
(United Kingdom) RKC/TGM Motorsport	Honda Civic Type R TCR (FK8)	99	(Pakistan) Umair Ahmed Khan	1
(Netherlands) Team Bleekemolen	SEAT León TCR	100	(Netherlands) Sebastiaan Bleekemolen	2
(Netherlands) Team Bleekemolen	SEAT León TCR	100	(Netherlands) Melvin de Groot	2
(Netherlands) Team Bleekemolen	SEAT León TCR	100	(United Kingdom) Rob Smith	2
(Netherlands) Team Bleekemolen	SEAT León TCR	100	(Netherlands) Rene Steenmetz	2
(Denmark) Holmgaard Motorsport	Volkswagen Golf GTI TCR	102	(Norway) Roy Edland	2–3, 6
(Denmark) Holmgaard Motorsport	Volkswagen Golf GTI TCR	102	(Denmark) Magnus Holmgaard	2–3, 6
(Denmark) Holmgaard Motorsport	Volkswagen Golf GTI TCR	102	(Denmark) Jens Mølgaard	2–3
(Denmark) Holmgaard Motorsport	Volkswagen Golf GTI TCR	102	(Denmark) Jonas Holmgaard	2–3, 6
(Denmark) Holmgaard Motorsport	Volkswagen Golf GTI TCR	102	(Denmark) René Rasmussen	2
(Denmark) Holmgaard Motorsport	Volkswagen Golf GTI TCR	102	(Denmark) Per Poulsen	6
(Switzerland) TTC Racing	SEAT León TCR	103	(Switzerland) Daniel Schilliger	3, 5
(Switzerland) TTC Racing	SEAT León TCR	103	(Switzerland) Adrian Spescha	3, 5
(Switzerland) TTC Racing	SEAT León TCR	103	(Switzerland) Fredy Suter	3, 5
(Switzerland) TTC Racing	SEAT León TCR	103	(Austria) Klaus Kresnik	5
(United Kingdom) Excelr8 Motorsport	Audi RS 3 LMS TCR	106	(United Kingdom) Stuart Hall	2
(United Kingdom) Excelr8 Motorsport	Audi RS 3 LMS TCR	106	(United Kingdom) James Kaye	2
(United Kingdom) Excelr8 Motorsport	Audi RS 3 LMS TCR	106	(United Kingdom) David Marcussen	2
(United Kingdom) Excelr8 Motorsport	Audi RS 3 LMS TCR	106	(United Kingdom) Sandy Mitchell	2
(United Kingdom) Excelr8 Motorsport	Audi RS 3 LMS TCR	106	(India) Akhil Rabindra	2
(Spain) Monlau Competición (Note: Car No. 107 entered as Monlau Competición and car No. 108 entered as Cupra Racing - Monlau Competición.) (Spain) Cupra Racing - Monlau Competición	CUPRA León TCR	107	(Spain) Alvaro Bajo	5
(Spain) Monlau Competición (Spain) Cupra Racing - Monlau Competición	CUPRA León TCR	107	(Spain) José Manuel Pérez Aicart	5
(Spain) Monlau Competición (Spain) Cupra Racing - Monlau Competición	CUPRA León TCR	107	(Belgium) Jurgen Smet	5
(Spain) Monlau Competición (Spain) Cupra Racing - Monlau Competición	CUPRA León TCR	107	(Spain) Ander Vilariño	5
(Spain) Monlau Competición (Spain) Cupra Racing - Monlau Competición	CUPRA León TCR	108	(Spain) Alba Cano Ramirez	5
(Spain) Monlau Competición (Spain) Cupra Racing - Monlau Competición	CUPRA León TCR	108	(Spain) Jordi Gené	5
(Spain) Monlau Competición (Spain) Cupra Racing - Monlau Competición	CUPRA León TCR	108	(Spain) Francesc Gutierrez Agüi	5
(Spain) Monlau Competición (Spain) Cupra Racing - Monlau Competición	CUPRA León TCR	108	(Spain) Laia Sanz	5
(Sweden) Lestrup Racing Team	Volkswagen Golf GTI TCR	110	(Sweden) Peter Fahlström	3, 6–7
(Sweden) Lestrup Racing Team	Volkswagen Golf GTI TCR	110	(Sweden) Stefan Nilsson	3, 6–7
(Sweden) Lestrup Racing Team	Volkswagen Golf GTI TCR	110	(Sweden) Mats Olsson	3, 6–7
(Sweden) Lestrup Racing Team	Volkswagen Golf GTI TCR	110	(Sweden) Emil Sällberg	3, 6
(Sweden) Lestrup Racing Team	Volkswagen Golf GTI TCR	110	(Sweden) Robin Fredriksson	7
(Switzerland) Stanco&Tanner Motorsport by Autorama Wetzikon	Audi RS 3 LMS TCR	112	(Switzerland) Ralf Henggeler	1
(Switzerland) Stanco&Tanner Motorsport by Autorama Wetzikon	Audi RS 3 LMS TCR	112	(United Kingdom) Andy Mollison	1
(Switzerland) Stanco&Tanner Motorsport by Autorama Wetzikon	Audi RS 3 LMS TCR	112	(Switzerland) Rudolf Rhyn	1
(Switzerland) Stanco&Tanner Motorsport by Autorama Wetzikon	Audi RS 3 LMS TCR	112	(Italy) Luigi Stanco	1
(Switzerland) Stanco&Tanner Motorsport by Autorama Wetzikon	Audi RS 3 LMS TCR	112	(Switzerland) Stefan Tanner	1
(Switzerland) Stanco&Tanner Motorsport by Autorama Wetzikon	SEAT León Cup Racer 1 Audi RS 3 LMS TCR 4	212	(Germany) Marlon Menden	1, 4
(Switzerland) Stanco&Tanner Motorsport by Autorama Wetzikon	SEAT León Cup Racer 1 Audi RS 3 LMS TCR 4	212	(Switzerland) Stefan Tanner	1, 4
(Switzerland) Stanco&Tanner Motorsport by Autorama Wetzikon	SEAT León Cup Racer 1 Audi RS 3 LMS TCR 4	212	(Australia) Cody Hill	1
(Switzerland) Stanco&Tanner Motorsport by Autorama Wetzikon	SEAT León Cup Racer 1 Audi RS 3 LMS TCR 4	212	(Switzerland) Rudolf Rhyn	1
(Switzerland) Stanco&Tanner Motorsport by Autorama Wetzikon	SEAT León Cup Racer 1 Audi RS 3 LMS TCR 4	212	(Switzerland) Adrian Spescha	1
(Switzerland) Stanco&Tanner Motorsport by Autorama Wetzikon	SEAT León Cup Racer 1 Audi RS 3 LMS TCR 4	212	(Switzerland) Ralf Henggeler	4
(Switzerland) Stanco&Tanner Motorsport by Autorama Wetzikon	SEAT León Cup Racer 1 Audi RS 3 LMS TCR 4	212	(Switzerland) Stephan Jäggi	4
(Germany) Bonk Motorsport	Audi RS 3 LMS TCR	115	(Germany) Volker Piepmeyer	1, 3–6
(Germany) Bonk Motorsport	Audi RS 3 LMS TCR	115	(Germany) Hermann Bock	1, 3–5
(Germany) Bonk Motorsport	Audi RS 3 LMS TCR	115	(Germany) Michael Bonk	1, 3–5
(Germany) Bonk Motorsport	Audi RS 3 LMS TCR	115	(Germany) Max Partl	1, 6
(Germany) Bonk Motorsport	Audi RS 3 LMS TCR	115	(Germany) Rainer Partl	1
(Germany) Bonk Motorsport	Audi RS 3 LMS TCR	115	(Germany) Alexander Prinz	4
(Germany) Bonk Motorsport	Audi RS 3 LMS TCR	115	(Austria) Constantin Kletzer	5–6
(Germany) Bonk Motorsport	Audi RS 3 LMS TCR	127	(Germany) Michael Bonk	1
(Germany) Bonk Motorsport	Audi RS 3 LMS TCR	127	(Germany) Axel Burghardt	1
(Germany) Bonk Motorsport	Audi RS 3 LMS TCR	127	(Germany) Volker Piepmeyer	1
(Germany) Bonk Motorsport	Audi RS 3 LMS TCR	127	(Germany) Simon Wirth	1
(United Kingdom) BPM Racing	CUPRA León TCR	120	(United Kingdom) Martin Byford	5
(United Kingdom) BPM Racing	CUPRA León TCR	120	(Netherlands) Melroy Heemskerk	5
(United Kingdom) BPM Racing	CUPRA León TCR	120	(United Kingdom) Ashley Woodman	5
(Sweden) SPV Racing	CUPRA León TCR	123	(Sweden) Ulf Hildebeck	6
(Sweden) SPV Racing	CUPRA León TCR	123	(Sweden) Peter Moller	6
(Sweden) SPV Racing	CUPRA León TCR	123	(Sweden) Daniel Reinhard	6
(Sweden) SPV Racing	CUPRA León TCR	123	(Sweden) Dag Wohlen	6
(Sweden) SPV Racing	CUPRA León TCR	123	(Sweden) Anders Zimdahl	6
(Sweden) SPV Racing	CUPRA León TCR	135	(Sweden) Erik Behrens	6
(Sweden) SPV Racing	CUPRA León TCR	135	(Sweden) Johan Gustafsson	6
(Sweden) SPV Racing	CUPRA León TCR	135	(Sweden) Lars Lindell	6
(Netherlands) Bas Koeten Racing (Note: Car No. 125 entered as Bas Koeten Racing, Car No. 129 entered as LMS Racing by Bas Koeten Racing, Car No. 155 entered as Kawasaki Racing by Bas Koeten Racing and car No. 175 entered as NKPP Racing by Bas Koeten Racing.) (Finland) LMS Racing by Bas Koeten Racing (Note: Car No. 129 entered with a SEAT León TCR in Round 1 and Round 2.) (Netherlands) Kawasaki Racing by Bas Koeten Racing (Netherlands) NKPP Racing by Bas Koeten Racing	Audi RS 3 LMS TCR	125	(United Kingdom) J. M. Littman	1, 6
(Netherlands) Bas Koeten Racing (Finland) LMS Racing by Bas Koeten Racing (Netherlands) Kawasaki Racing by Bas Koeten Racing (Netherlands) NKPP Racing by Bas Koeten Racing	Audi RS 3 LMS TCR	125	(Netherlands) Mathijs Bakker	1
(Netherlands) Bas Koeten Racing (Finland) LMS Racing by Bas Koeten Racing (Netherlands) Kawasaki Racing by Bas Koeten Racing (Netherlands) NKPP Racing by Bas Koeten Racing	Audi RS 3 LMS TCR	125	(Switzerland) Ronny Jost	1
(Netherlands) Bas Koeten Racing (Finland) LMS Racing by Bas Koeten Racing (Netherlands) Kawasaki Racing by Bas Koeten Racing (Netherlands) NKPP Racing by Bas Koeten Racing	Audi RS 3 LMS TCR	125	(Belgium) Anthony Lambert	1
(Netherlands) Bas Koeten Racing (Finland) LMS Racing by Bas Koeten Racing (Netherlands) Kawasaki Racing by Bas Koeten Racing (Netherlands) NKPP Racing by Bas Koeten Racing	Audi RS 3 LMS TCR	125	(Germany) Marlon Menden	6
(Netherlands) Bas Koeten Racing (Finland) LMS Racing by Bas Koeten Racing (Netherlands) Kawasaki Racing by Bas Koeten Racing (Netherlands) NKPP Racing by Bas Koeten Racing	Audi RS 3 LMS TCR	125	(Germany) Wolfgang Haugg	6
(Netherlands) Bas Koeten Racing (Finland) LMS Racing by Bas Koeten Racing (Netherlands) Kawasaki Racing by Bas Koeten Racing (Netherlands) NKPP Racing by Bas Koeten Racing	CUPRA León TCR	129	(Finland) Antti Buri	1–3, 6–7
(Netherlands) Bas Koeten Racing (Finland) LMS Racing by Bas Koeten Racing (Netherlands) Kawasaki Racing by Bas Koeten Racing (Netherlands) NKPP Racing by Bas Koeten Racing	CUPRA León TCR	129	(Finland) Olli Parhankangas	1–3, 6–7
(Netherlands) Bas Koeten Racing (Finland) LMS Racing by Bas Koeten Racing (Netherlands) Kawasaki Racing by Bas Koeten Racing (Netherlands) NKPP Racing by Bas Koeten Racing	CUPRA León TCR	129	(Finland) Kari-Pekka Laaksonen	1–2, 6–7
(Netherlands) Bas Koeten Racing (Finland) LMS Racing by Bas Koeten Racing (Netherlands) Kawasaki Racing by Bas Koeten Racing (Netherlands) NKPP Racing by Bas Koeten Racing	CUPRA León TCR	129	(Netherlands) Willem Meijer	1
(Netherlands) Bas Koeten Racing (Finland) LMS Racing by Bas Koeten Racing (Netherlands) Kawasaki Racing by Bas Koeten Racing (Netherlands) NKPP Racing by Bas Koeten Racing	CUPRA León TCR	129	(Switzerland) Ronny Jost	7
(Netherlands) Bas Koeten Racing (Finland) LMS Racing by Bas Koeten Racing (Netherlands) Kawasaki Racing by Bas Koeten Racing (Netherlands) NKPP Racing by Bas Koeten Racing	CUPRA León TCR	155	(Denmark) Kristian Jepsen	2–4, 6
(Netherlands) Bas Koeten Racing (Finland) LMS Racing by Bas Koeten Racing (Netherlands) Kawasaki Racing by Bas Koeten Racing (Netherlands) NKPP Racing by Bas Koeten Racing	CUPRA León TCR	155	(Belgium) Anthony Lambert	2–3
(Netherlands) Bas Koeten Racing (Finland) LMS Racing by Bas Koeten Racing (Netherlands) Kawasaki Racing by Bas Koeten Racing (Netherlands) NKPP Racing by Bas Koeten Racing	CUPRA León TCR	155	(Denmark) Jan Sørensen	2–4, 6
(Netherlands) Bas Koeten Racing (Finland) LMS Racing by Bas Koeten Racing (Netherlands) Kawasaki Racing by Bas Koeten Racing (Netherlands) NKPP Racing by Bas Koeten Racing	CUPRA León TCR	155	(United Kingdom) J. M. Littman	2, 5
(Netherlands) Bas Koeten Racing (Finland) LMS Racing by Bas Koeten Racing (Netherlands) Kawasaki Racing by Bas Koeten Racing (Netherlands) NKPP Racing by Bas Koeten Racing	CUPRA León TCR	155	(Finland) Kari-Pekka Laaksonen	4
(Netherlands) Bas Koeten Racing (Finland) LMS Racing by Bas Koeten Racing (Netherlands) Kawasaki Racing by Bas Koeten Racing (Netherlands) NKPP Racing by Bas Koeten Racing	CUPRA León TCR	155	(Finland) Antti Buri	4
(Netherlands) Bas Koeten Racing (Finland) LMS Racing by Bas Koeten Racing (Netherlands) Kawasaki Racing by Bas Koeten Racing (Netherlands) NKPP Racing by Bas Koeten Racing	CUPRA León TCR	155	(Germany) Joachim Bölting	5
(Netherlands) Bas Koeten Racing (Finland) LMS Racing by Bas Koeten Racing (Netherlands) Kawasaki Racing by Bas Koeten Racing (Netherlands) NKPP Racing by Bas Koeten Racing	CUPRA León TCR	155	(France) Pierre-Arnaud Navarro	5
(Netherlands) Bas Koeten Racing (Finland) LMS Racing by Bas Koeten Racing (Netherlands) Kawasaki Racing by Bas Koeten Racing (Netherlands) NKPP Racing by Bas Koeten Racing	CUPRA León TCR	155	(France) Jean-Laurent Navarro	5
(Netherlands) Bas Koeten Racing (Finland) LMS Racing by Bas Koeten Racing (Netherlands) Kawasaki Racing by Bas Koeten Racing (Netherlands) NKPP Racing by Bas Koeten Racing	CUPRA León TCR	175	(Netherlands) Gijs Bessem	2–7
(Netherlands) Bas Koeten Racing (Finland) LMS Racing by Bas Koeten Racing (Netherlands) Kawasaki Racing by Bas Koeten Racing (Netherlands) NKPP Racing by Bas Koeten Racing	CUPRA León TCR	175	(Netherlands) Harry Hilders	2–7
(Netherlands) Bas Koeten Racing (Finland) LMS Racing by Bas Koeten Racing (Netherlands) Kawasaki Racing by Bas Koeten Racing (Netherlands) NKPP Racing by Bas Koeten Racing	CUPRA León TCR	175	(Switzerland) Fabian Danz	2
(Netherlands) Bas Koeten Racing (Finland) LMS Racing by Bas Koeten Racing (Netherlands) Kawasaki Racing by Bas Koeten Racing (Netherlands) NKPP Racing by Bas Koeten Racing	CUPRA León TCR	175	(Switzerland) Ronny Jost	2
(Netherlands) Bas Koeten Racing (Finland) LMS Racing by Bas Koeten Racing (Netherlands) Kawasaki Racing by Bas Koeten Racing (Netherlands) NKPP Racing by Bas Koeten Racing	CUPRA León TCR	175	(Netherlands) Bob Herber	4
(Netherlands) Bas Koeten Racing (Finland) LMS Racing by Bas Koeten Racing (Netherlands) Kawasaki Racing by Bas Koeten Racing (Netherlands) NKPP Racing by Bas Koeten Racing	CUPRA León TCR	175	(Netherlands) Willem Meijer	4
(Netherlands) Bas Koeten Racing (Finland) LMS Racing by Bas Koeten Racing (Netherlands) Kawasaki Racing by Bas Koeten Racing (Netherlands) NKPP Racing by Bas Koeten Racing	CUPRA León TCR	175	(Denmark) Kristian Jepsen	5
(Netherlands) Bas Koeten Racing (Finland) LMS Racing by Bas Koeten Racing (Netherlands) Kawasaki Racing by Bas Koeten Racing (Netherlands) NKPP Racing by Bas Koeten Racing	CUPRA León TCR	175	(Denmark) Jan Sorensen	5
(Netherlands) Bas Koeten Racing (Finland) LMS Racing by Bas Koeten Racing (Netherlands) Kawasaki Racing by Bas Koeten Racing (Netherlands) NKPP Racing by Bas Koeten Racing	CUPRA León TCR	175	(Netherlands) Roeland Voerman	7
(Germany) Liqui Moly Team Engstler	Volkswagen Golf GTI TCR	130	(Germany) Luca Engstler	1
(Germany) Liqui Moly Team Engstler	Volkswagen Golf GTI TCR	130	(Germany) Benjamin Leuchter	1
(Germany) Liqui Moly Team Engstler	Volkswagen Golf GTI TCR	130	(Switzerland) Florian Thoma	1
(Germany) Liqui Moly Team Engstler	Volkswagen Golf GTI TCR	130	(France) Jean-Karl Vernay	1
(Spain) Baporo Motorsport	Audi RS 3 LMS TCR	133	(Italy) Roberto Ferri	5–6
(Spain) Baporo Motorsport	Audi RS 3 LMS TCR	133	(Italy) Alberto Vescovi	5–6
(Spain) Baporo Motorsport	Audi RS 3 LMS TCR	133	(Spain) Jaime Font Casas	5
(Spain) Baporo Motorsport	Audi RS 3 LMS TCR	133	(Spain) Alvaro Vela	5
(Spain) Baporo Motorsport	Audi RS 3 LMS TCR	133	(Argentina) José Manuel Sapag	6
(Spain) Baporo Motorsport	CUPRA León TCR	147	(Spain) Jaime Font Casas	6
(Spain) Baporo Motorsport	CUPRA León TCR	147	(Andorra) Joan Vinyes	6
(France) Motorsport developpement	Volkswagen Golf GTI TCR	136	(France) Jean-Laurent Navarro	2, 6
(France) Motorsport developpement	Volkswagen Golf GTI TCR	136	(Russia) Maxim Aronov	2
(France) Motorsport developpement	Volkswagen Golf GTI TCR	136	(France) Thierry Blaise	2
(France) Motorsport developpement	Volkswagen Golf GTI TCR	136	(Russia) Lev Fridman	2
(France) Motorsport developpement	Volkswagen Golf GTI TCR	136	(France) Gael Castelli	3
(France) Motorsport developpement	Volkswagen Golf GTI TCR	136	(France) Alexandre Jenouvrier	3
(France) Motorsport developpement	Volkswagen Golf GTI TCR	136	(Italy) Roberto Nale	3
(France) Motorsport developpement	Volkswagen Golf GTI TCR	136	(France) Dominique Nury	3
(France) Motorsport developpement	Volkswagen Golf GTI TCR	136	(France) Pierre-Arnaud Navarro	6
(France) Motorsport developpement	Volkswagen Golf GTI TCR	136	(Belgium) Hervé Maillien	6
(France) RWP Racing by Motorsport developpement	CUPRA León TCR	137	(Hong Kong) Gary Cheung	6
(France) RWP Racing by Motorsport developpement	CUPRA León TCR	137	(Hong Kong) David Lau	6
(France) RWP Racing by Motorsport developpement	CUPRA León TCR	137	(Finland) Pekka Saarinen	6
(France) RWP Racing by Motorsport developpement	CUPRA León TCR	137	(Hong Kong) Terence Tse	6
MARC Cars Australia TCR	Audi RS 3 LMS TCR	138	(United Kingdom) James Kaye	5–6
MARC Cars Australia TCR	Audi RS 3 LMS TCR	138	(United Kingdom) Neil Garnham	5
MARC Cars Australia TCR	Audi RS 3 LMS TCR	138	(United Kingdom) Matt LeBreton	5
MARC Cars Australia TCR	Audi RS 3 LMS TCR	138	(United Kingdom) Rob Young	5
MARC Cars Australia TCR	Audi RS 3 LMS TCR	138	(Republic of Ireland) Erik Holstein	6
(Estonia) ALM Motorsport	CUPRA León TCR	144	(Lithuania) Dziugas Tovilavicius	6
(Estonia) ALM Motorsport	CUPRA León TCR	144	(Lithuania) Justas Jonušis	6
(Estonia) ALM Motorsport	CUPRA León TCR	144	(Estonia) Robin Vaks	6
(Lithuania) GSR Motorsport	Volkswagen Golf GTI TCR	146	(Lithuania) Julius Adomavičius	6
(Lithuania) GSR Motorsport	Volkswagen Golf GTI TCR	146	(Lithuania) Arūnas Gečiauskas	6
(Lithuania) GSR Motorsport	Volkswagen Golf GTI TCR	146	(Lithuania) Ernesta Globytė	6
(Lithuania) GSR Motorsport	Volkswagen Golf GTI TCR	146	(Lithuania) Vytenis Gulbinas	6
(Germany) Sorg Rennsport	Audi RS 3 LMS TCR	152	(United States) Ray Mason	7
(Germany) Sorg Rennsport	Audi RS 3 LMS TCR	152	(United States) Harold Petit	7
(Germany) Sorg Rennsport	Audi RS 3 LMS TCR	152	(United States) Dan Rogers	7
(Germany) Sorg Rennsport	Audi RS 3 LMS TCR	152	(Germany) Björn Simon	7
(Germany) Sorg Rennsport	Audi RS 3 LMS TCR	152	(United States) Seth Thomas	7
(San Marino) GDL Racing	Audi RS 3 LMS TCR	167	(Argentina) Facundo Chahwan	6
(San Marino) GDL Racing	Audi RS 3 LMS TCR	167	(Argentina) Carlos Federico Braga	6
(San Marino) GDL Racing	Audi RS 3 LMS TCR	167	(Argentina) Andres Josephsohn	6
(San Marino) GDL Racing	Audi RS 3 LMS TCR	167	(Argentina) Alejandro Walter Chahwan	6
(Hong Kong) Modena Motorsports (Note: Car No. 216 entered with a SEAT León TCR in Round 1.)	SEAT León TCR 1 CUPRA León TCR 3	216	(Switzerland) Mathias Beche	1, 3
(Hong Kong) Modena Motorsports	SEAT León TCR 1 CUPRA León TCR 3	216	(Canada) John Shen	1, 3
(Hong Kong) Modena Motorsports	SEAT León TCR 1 CUPRA León TCR 3	216	(Canada) Wayne Shen	1, 3
(Hong Kong) Modena Motorsports	SEAT León TCR 1 CUPRA León TCR 3	216	(Netherlands) Francis Tjia	1, 3
(Hong Kong) Modena Motorsports	SEAT León TCR 1 CUPRA León TCR 3	216	(Denmark) Benny Simonsen	1
(Hong Kong) Modena Motorsports	SEAT León Cup Racer	217	(Switzerland) Mathias Beche	3
(Hong Kong) Modena Motorsports	SEAT León Cup Racer	217	(Canada) Christian Chia	3
(Hong Kong) Modena Motorsports	SEAT León Cup Racer	217	(Indonesia) Michael Soeryadjaya	3
(Hong Kong) Modena Motorsports	SEAT León Cup Racer	217	(Netherlands) Marcel Tjia	3
(United Kingdom) J W BIRD Motorsport	Volkswagen Golf GTI TCR	221	(United Kingdom) Rory Butcher	2
(United Kingdom) J W BIRD Motorsport	Volkswagen Golf GTI TCR	221	(United Kingdom) Paul Dehadray	2
(United Kingdom) J W BIRD Motorsport	Volkswagen Golf GTI TCR	221	(United Kingdom) Kieran Griffin	2
(United Kingdom) J W BIRD Motorsport	Volkswagen Golf GTI TCR	221	(United Kingdom) William Paul	2
(Netherlands) Red Camel-Jordans.nl	SEAT León Cup Racer	303	(Netherlands) Ivo Breukers	1–3, 5–6
(Netherlands) Red Camel-Jordans.nl	SEAT León Cup Racer	303	(Russia) Maxim Aronov	1
(Netherlands) Red Camel-Jordans.nl	SEAT León Cup Racer	303	(Russia) Lev Fridman	1
(Netherlands) Red Camel-Jordans.nl	SEAT León Cup Racer	303	(Germany) Dirk Vorländer	1
(Netherlands) Red Camel-Jordans.nl	SEAT León Cup Racer	303	(Netherlands) Rik Breukers	2–3, 5–6
(Netherlands) Red Camel-Jordans.nl	SEAT León Cup Racer	303	(Latvia) Konstantīns Calko	2
(Netherlands) Red Camel-Jordans.nl	SEAT León Cup Racer	303	(Germany) Henry Littig	4-5
(Netherlands) Red Camel-Jordans.nl	SEAT León Cup Racer	303	(United Kingdom) J. M. Littman	4
(Netherlands) Red Camel-Jordans.nl	SEAT León Cup Racer	303	(Austria) Klaus Kresnik	4
(Netherlands) Red Camel-Jordans.nl	SEAT León Cup Racer	303	(Portugal) Nuno Corvo	4
(Netherlands) Red Camel-Jordans.nl	SEAT León Cup Racer	303	(Netherlands) Bert de Heus	5
(Netherlands) Red Camel-Jordans.nl	SEAT León Cup Racer	303	(Netherlands) Monny Krant	5
(France) Team Altran Peugeot	Peugeot 308 Racing Cup TCR	308	(Denmark) Kim Holmgaard	1, 4-5, 7
(France) Team Altran Peugeot	Peugeot 308 Racing Cup TCR	308	(France) Guillaume Roman	1, 4-5, 7
(France) Team Altran Peugeot	Peugeot 308 Racing Cup TCR	308	(France) Olivier Baron	1
(France) Team Altran Peugeot	Peugeot 308 Racing Cup TCR	308	(Denmark) Michael Carlsen	1
(France) Team Altran Peugeot	Peugeot 308 Racing Cup TCR	308	(France) Thierry Blaise	4-5, 7
(France) Team Altran Peugeot	Peugeot 308 Racing Cup TCR	308	(France) Stephane Ventaja	4
(France) Team Altran Peugeot	Peugeot 308 Racing Cup TCR	308	(France) Sebastien Dussolliet	5
(France) Team Altran Peugeot	Peugeot 308 Racing Cup TCR	308	(France) Marc Guillot	7
(France) Team Altran Peugeot	Peugeot 308 Racing Cup TCR	908	(France) Lionel Amrouche	1
(France) Team Altran Peugeot	Peugeot 308 Racing Cup TCR	908	(France) Cyril Calmon	1
(France) Team Altran Peugeot	Peugeot 308 Racing Cup TCR	908	(Iran) Aram Martroussian	1
(France) Team Altran Peugeot	Peugeot 308 Racing Cup TCR	908	(Denmark) Henrik Sørensen	1
(France) Team Altran Peugeot	Peugeot 308 Racing Cup TCR	908	(France) Thierry Boyer	4-5
(France) Team Altran Peugeot	Peugeot 308 Racing Cup TCR	908	(France) François Riaux	4
(France) Team Altran Peugeot	Peugeot 308 Racing Cup TCR	908	(France) Michel Derue	4
(France) Team Altran Peugeot	Peugeot 308 Racing Cup TCR	908	(France) Thierry Chkondali	4
(France) Team Altran Peugeot	Peugeot 308 Racing Cup TCR	908	(Denmark) Michael Carlsen	5
(France) Team Altran Peugeot	Peugeot 308 Racing Cup TCR	908	(Denmark) Martin Gøtsche	5
(France) Team Altran Peugeot	Peugeot 308 Racing Cup TCR	908	(Switzerland) Jérôme Ogay	5
(France) Team Altran Peugeot	Peugeot 308 Racing Cup TCR	908	(France) Cyrus Ayari	7
(France) Team Altran Peugeot	Peugeot 308 Racing Cup TCR	908	(Germany) Jürgen Nett	7
(France) Team Altran Peugeot	Peugeot 308 Racing Cup TCR	908	(Canada) Michel Sallenbach	7
(France) Team Altran Peugeot	Peugeot 308 Racing Cup TCR	908	(France) Jean-Marc Thevenot	7
(France) B2F compétition	Peugeot 308 Racing Cup TCR	335	(France) Pascal Colon	3
(France) B2F compétition	Peugeot 308 Racing Cup TCR	335	(France) Thomas Fretin	3
(France) B2F compétition	Peugeot 308 Racing Cup TCR	335	(France) Regis Paillard	3
(France) TFT/top loc racing	Audi RS 3 LMS TCR	555	(France) Bruno Bazaud	3, 5, 7
(France) TFT/top loc racing	Audi RS 3 LMS TCR	555	(France) Denis Caillon	3, 5, 7
(France) TFT/top loc racing	Audi RS 3 LMS TCR	555	(France) Sebastien Morales	3, 5, 7
(France) TFT/top loc racing	Audi RS 3 LMS TCR	555	(France) Philippe Thirion	3, 5, 7
(France) TFT/top loc racing	Audi RS 3 LMS TCR	555	(France) Antoine Lacoste	5, 7
(Belgium) AC Motorsport	Audi RS 3 LMS TCR	888	(France) Stéphane Perrin	1, 5–6
(Belgium) AC Motorsport	Audi RS 3 LMS TCR	888	(Belgium) Vincent Radermecker	1, 5–6
(Belgium) AC Motorsport	Audi RS 3 LMS TCR	888	(France) Alexandre Renneteau	1, 5
(Belgium) AC Motorsport	Audi RS 3 LMS TCR	888	(Latvia) Reinis Nitišs	1
(Belgium) AC Motorsport	Audi RS 3 LMS TCR	888	(France) Laurent Piguet	5
SP3
(Netherlands) Cor Euser Racing	BMW M3 (E46) GT	71	(Netherlands) Cor Euser	1, 4, 7
(Netherlands) Cor Euser Racing	BMW M3 (E46) GT	71	(Norway) Einar Thorsen	1, 4, 7
(Netherlands) Cor Euser Racing	BMW M3 (E46) GT	71	(Germany) Klaus-Dieter Frommer	1
(Netherlands) Cor Euser Racing	BMW M3 (E46) GT	71	(United States) McKay Snow	1
(Netherlands) Cor Euser Racing	BMW M3 (E46) GT	71	(United States) Jim Briody	4, 7
(Netherlands) Cor Euser Racing	BMW M3 (E46) GT	71	(Netherlands) Niels Bouwhuis	7
(Netherlands) JR Motorsport	BMW M3 (E46) GT	118	(Belgium) Ward Sluys	3, 6
(Netherlands) JR Motorsport	BMW M3 (E46) GT	118	(United Kingdom) Steven Liquorish	3
(Netherlands) JR Motorsport	BMW M3 (E46) GT	118	(Netherlands) Bas Schouten	3
(Netherlands) JR Motorsport	BMW M3 (E46) GT	118	(Netherlands) Ruud Olij	6
(Netherlands) JR Motorsport	BMW M3 (E46) GT	118	(Netherlands) Michael Verhagen	6
(Germany) GermanWheels	BMW M3 Coupé (E46)	132	(Germany) Klaus Engelbrecht-Schnür	3
(Germany) GermanWheels	BMW M3 Coupé (E46)	132	(Germany) Jan C. Kortüm	3
(Germany) GermanWheels	BMW M3 Coupé (E46)	132	(Germany) Michael Luther	3
(United Kingdom) WEC Motorsport	BMW M3 (E46) GT	139	(United Kingdom) Dave Cox	4
(United Kingdom) WEC Motorsport	BMW M3 (E46) GT	139	(United Kingdom) Jason Cox	4
(United Kingdom) WEC Motorsport	BMW M3 (E46) GT	139	(United Kingdom) Michael Cox	4
(United Kingdom) WEC Motorsport	BMW M3 (E46) GT	139	(United Kingdom) Guy Povey	4
(United Kingdom) WEC Motorsport	BMW M3 (E46) GT	139	(United Kingdom) George Haynes	4
(United Kingdom) / CWS Engineering (Note: Car No. 178 entered as CWS Engineering and car No. 278 entered as CWS.); (United Kingdom) / CWS	Ginetta G55 GT4	178	(United Kingdom) Colin White	1, 4–6
(United Kingdom) / CWS Engineering; (United Kingdom) / CWS	Ginetta G55 GT4	178	(United Kingdom) Jac Constable	1
(United Kingdom) / CWS Engineering; (United Kingdom) / CWS	Ginetta G55 GT4	178	(South Africa) Bradley Liebenberg	1
(United Kingdom) / CWS Engineering; (United Kingdom) / CWS	Ginetta G55 GT4	178	(South Africa) Simon Murray	1
(United Kingdom) / CWS Engineering; (United Kingdom) / CWS	Ginetta G55 GT4	178	(United Kingdom) Steven Wells	4-5
(United Kingdom) / CWS Engineering; (United Kingdom) / CWS	Ginetta G55 GT4	178	(United Kingdom) Adam Hayes	4
(United Kingdom) / CWS Engineering; (United Kingdom) / CWS	Ginetta G55 GT4	178	(Germany) Joachim Bölting	4
(United Kingdom) / CWS Engineering; (United Kingdom) / CWS	Ginetta G55 GT4	178	(United Kingdom) James May	5-6
(United Kingdom) / CWS Engineering; (United Kingdom) / CWS	Ginetta G55 GT4	178	(United Kingdom) Paul May	5
(United Kingdom) / CWS Engineering; (United Kingdom) / CWS	Ginetta G55 GT4	278	(United Kingdom) Adam Hayes	1, 5
(United Kingdom) / CWS Engineering; (United Kingdom) / CWS	Ginetta G55 GT4	278	(United Kingdom) James May	1
(United Kingdom) / CWS Engineering; (United Kingdom) / CWS	Ginetta G55 GT4	278	(United Kingdom) Paul May	1
(United Kingdom) / CWS Engineering; (United Kingdom) / CWS	Ginetta G55 GT4	278	(United Kingdom) Steven Wells	1
(United Kingdom) / CWS Engineering; (United Kingdom) / CWS	Ginetta G55 GT4	278	(United Kingdom) Nick Adcock	5
(United Kingdom) / CWS Engineering; (United Kingdom) / CWS	Ginetta G55 GT4	278	(United Kingdom) Matthew Nicoll-Jones	5
(United Kingdom) / CWS Engineering; (United Kingdom) / CWS	Ginetta G55 GT4	278	(United Kingdom) Finlay Hutchison	5
(United Kingdom) / CWS Engineering; (United Kingdom) / CWS	Ginetta G55 GT4	278	(Denmark) Michael Jensen	5
(United Kingdom) AMR Performance Centre	Aston Martin Vantage GT8	226	(United Kingdom) Peter Cate	6
(United Kingdom) AMR Performance Centre	Aston Martin Vantage GT8	226	(United Kingdom) Sir Chris Hoy	6
(United Kingdom) AMR Performance Centre	Aston Martin Vantage GT8	226	(United Kingdom) Andy Palmer	6
(United Kingdom) Century Motorsport	Ginetta G55 GT4	229	(United Kingdom) Jon Barnes	1
(United Kingdom) Century Motorsport	Ginetta G55 GT4	229	(United Kingdom) Mark Farmer	1
(United Kingdom) Century Motorsport	Ginetta G55 GT4	229	(United Kingdom) Nathan Freke	1
(United Kingdom) Century Motorsport	Ginetta G55 GT4	229	(United Kingdom) Dominic Paul	1
(United Kingdom) Optimum Motorsport	Ginetta G55 GT4	232	(United Kingdom) Adrian Barwick	1
(United Kingdom) Optimum Motorsport	Ginetta G55 GT4	232	(United Kingdom) Marc Brough	1
(United Kingdom) Optimum Motorsport	Ginetta G55 GT4	232	(United Kingdom) Charlie Hollings	1
(United Kingdom) Optimum Motorsport	Ginetta G55 GT4	232	(United Kingdom) William Moore	1
(United Kingdom) Team ABBA with Rollcentre Racing	BMW M3 V8 (E46) GT	234	(United Kingdom) Richard Neary	6
(United Kingdom) Team ABBA with Rollcentre Racing	BMW M3 V8 (E46) GT	234	(United Kingdom) Sam Neary	6
(United Kingdom) Team ABBA with Rollcentre Racing	BMW M3 V8 (E46) GT	234	(United Kingdom) Ian Stinton	6
(France) LAMERA-CUP	Lamera Cup	237	(France) Eric Darné	1
(France) LAMERA-CUP	Lamera Cup	237	(France) Hervé Dumas	1
(France) LAMERA-CUP	Lamera Cup	237	(France) Thomas Merafina	1
(France) LAMERA-CUP	Lamera Cup	237	(France) Gaël Penelon	1
(France) LAMERA-CUP	Lamera Cup	238	(France) Nicolas Béraud	1, 4, 7
(France) LAMERA-CUP	Lamera Cup	238	(France) Fabien Delaplace	1, 4, 7
(France) LAMERA-CUP	Lamera Cup	238	(France) Laurent Piguet	1, 4, 7
(France) LAMERA-CUP	Lamera Cup	238	(France) Stéphane Pasquet	1
(France) LAMERA-CUP	Lamera Cup	238	(France) Gilles Poret	4
(France) LAMERA-CUP	Lamera Cup	238	(France) Thierry Soave	7
(Netherlands) Munckhof Racing	BMW M4 GT Silhouette	259	(Netherlands) Marco Poland	3, 5–6
(Netherlands) Munckhof Racing	BMW M4 GT Silhouette	259	(Netherlands) Frank Bedorf	3
(Netherlands) Munckhof Racing	BMW M4 GT Silhouette	259	(Netherlands) Eric van den Munckhof	5–6
(Netherlands) Munckhof Racing	BMW M4 GT Silhouette	259	(Netherlands) Marcel van Berlo	5
(Netherlands) Munckhof Racing	BMW M4 GT Silhouette	259	(Netherlands) Ted van Vliet	5
(Netherlands) Munckhof Racing	BMW M4 GT Silhouette	259	(Netherlands) Simon Knap	6
(Denmark) Scangrip Racing	BMW 335i Coupé (E92) GT	786	(Denmark) Niels Borum	1, 3
(Denmark) Scangrip Racing	BMW 335i Coupé (E92) GT	786	(Denmark) Anders Lund	1
(Denmark) Scangrip Racing	BMW 335i Coupé (E92) GT	786	(Denmark) Sune Marcussen	1
(Denmark) Scangrip Racing	BMW 335i Coupé (E92) GT	786	(Denmark) Michael Nielsen	1
(Denmark) Scangrip Racing	BMW 335i Coupé (E92) GT	786	(New Zealand) Michael Eden	3
A3
(United Kingdom) Synchro Motorsport	Honda Civic Type R (FK2) 2 Honda Civic Type R (FK8) 5	76	(United Kingdom) Alyn James	2, 5–6
(United Kingdom) Synchro Motorsport	Honda Civic Type R (FK2) 2 Honda Civic Type R (FK8) 5	76	(United Kingdom) Daniel Wheeler	2, 5–6
(United Kingdom) Synchro Motorsport	Honda Civic Type R (FK2) 2 Honda Civic Type R (FK8) 5	76	(United Kingdom) Matt Neal	2, 6
(United Kingdom) Synchro Motorsport	Honda Civic Type R (FK2) 2 Honda Civic Type R (FK8) 5	76	(United Kingdom) Andrew Hack	5
(United Kingdom) Excelr8 Motorsport	Mini F56 JCW	134	(United Kingdom) Max Bladon	2
(United Kingdom) Excelr8 Motorsport	Mini F56 JCW	134	(United Kingdom) Ricky Coomber	2
(United Kingdom) Excelr8 Motorsport	Mini F56 JCW	134	(United Kingdom) Rob Smith	2
(United Kingdom) Excelr8 Motorsport	Mini F56 JCW	134	(Hong Kong) Ivan Szeto	2
(United Kingdom) Excelr8 Motorsport	Mini F56 JCW	134	(Hong Kong) Clement Tong	2
(United Kingdom) WEC Motorsport	BMW M3 (E46) GT	139	(United Kingdom) Dave Cox	6
(United Kingdom) WEC Motorsport	BMW M3 (E46) GT	139	(United Kingdom) George Haynes	6
(United Kingdom) WEC Motorsport	BMW M3 (E46) GT	139	(United Kingdom) Guy Povey	6
(Spain) TICTAP TOTCAR SPORT	SEAT León Supercopa MK2 WTCC	141	(Spain) Jorge Belloc Diaz	6
(Spain) TICTAP TOTCAR SPORT	SEAT León Supercopa MK2 WTCC	141	(Spain) Jorge Belloc Ruiz	6
(Spain) TICTAP TOTCAR SPORT	SEAT León Supercopa MK2 WTCC	141	(Spain) Isidoro Diaz-Guerra Gonzalez	6
(Denmark) Dan Agro Racing	Peugeot RCZ	185	(Denmark) Sune Marcussen	6
(Denmark) Dan Agro Racing	Peugeot RCZ	185	(Denmark) Anders Rasmussen	6
(Denmark) Dan Agro Racing	Peugeot RCZ	185	(Denmark) Henrik Thomsen	6
(Denmark) Dan Agro Racing	Peugeot RCZ	185	(Denmark) Nicolaj Kandborg	6
(Belgium) PDM Motorsport	BMW Z3 M Coupé	999	(Belgium) Pierre De Landsheere	2, 6
(Belgium) PDM Motorsport	BMW Z3 M Coupé	999	(Belgium) Dimitri Kluyskens	2, 6
(Belgium) PDM Motorsport	BMW Z3 M Coupé	999	(Belgium) Maxence Vandekerckhove	2, 6
(Belgium) PDM Motorsport	BMW Z3 M Coupé	999	(Belgium) Peter Puype	2
CUP1
(Switzerland) Hofor Racing powered bei Bonk Motorsport	BMW M235i Racing Cup	127	(Germany) Axel Burghardt	3
(Switzerland) Hofor Racing powered bei Bonk Motorsport	BMW M235i Racing Cup	127	(Switzerland) Martin Kroll	3
(Switzerland) Hofor Racing powered bei Bonk Motorsport	BMW M235i Racing Cup	127	(Germany) Jurgen Meyer	3
(Switzerland) Hofor Racing powered bei Bonk Motorsport	BMW M235i Racing Cup	131	(Austria) Gustav Engljähringer	All
(Switzerland) Hofor Racing powered bei Bonk Motorsport	BMW M235i Racing Cup	131	(Austria) Michael Fischer	All
(Switzerland) Hofor Racing powered bei Bonk Motorsport	BMW M235i Racing Cup	131	(Switzerland) Martin Kroll	All
(Switzerland) Hofor Racing powered bei Bonk Motorsport	BMW M235i Racing Cup	131	(Germany) Bernd Küpper	All
(Switzerland) Hofor Racing powered bei Bonk Motorsport	BMW M235i Racing Cup	131	(Germany) Michael Schrey	All
(Germany) Sorg Rennsport	BMW M235i Racing Cup	151	(United Kingdom) Josh Caygill	1
(Germany) Sorg Rennsport	BMW M235i Racing Cup	151	(Switzerland) Fabian Danz	1
(Germany) Sorg Rennsport	BMW M235i Racing Cup	151	(Germany) Stephan Epp	1
(Germany) Sorg Rennsport	BMW M235i Racing Cup	151	(Switzerland) Yannick Mettler	1
(Germany) Sorg Rennsport	BMW M235i Racing Cup	151	(Switzerland) Kris Richard	1
(Germany) Sorg Rennsport	BMW M235i Racing Cup	151	(United States) Gamaliel Aguilar-Gamez	3
(Germany) Sorg Rennsport	BMW M235i Racing Cup	151	(United States) Rob Cohen	3
(Germany) Sorg Rennsport	BMW M235i Racing Cup	151	(United States) Seth Thomas	3-4, 6
(Germany) Sorg Rennsport	BMW M235i Racing Cup	151	(United States) Dan Rogers	3, 6
(Germany) Sorg Rennsport	BMW M235i Racing Cup	151	(United States) Chris Wadle	4, 6
(Germany) Sorg Rennsport	BMW M235i Racing Cup	151	(United States) Chris Lewis	4
(Germany) Sorg Rennsport	BMW M235i Racing Cup	151	(United States) David Richardson	4
(Germany) Sorg Rennsport	BMW M235i Racing Cup	151	(United States) Alexander W. Wetzlich	4
(Germany) Sorg Rennsport	BMW M235i Racing Cup	151	(United States) William Hendrix	7
(Germany) Sorg Rennsport	BMW M235i Racing Cup	151	(Mexico) Benito Tagle	7
(Germany) Sorg Rennsport	BMW M235i Racing Cup	151	(United States) Simon Tibbett	7
(Germany) Sorg Rennsport	BMW M235i Racing Cup	151	(Peru) Ricardo Flores	7
(Germany) Sorg Rennsport	BMW M235i Racing Cup	152	(Germany) Stefan Beyer	1
(Germany) Sorg Rennsport	BMW M235i Racing Cup	152	(China) Li Fei	1
(Germany) Sorg Rennsport	BMW M235i Racing Cup	152	(China) Stephen Gu	1
(Germany) Sorg Rennsport	BMW M235i Racing Cup	152	(Germany) Christoph Hewer	1
(Germany) Sorg Rennsport	BMW M235i Racing Cup	152	(United States) Cameron Lawrence	1
(Germany) Sorg Rennsport	BMW M235i Racing Cup	152	(Estonia) Keijo Kaasik	4
(Germany) Sorg Rennsport	BMW M235i Racing Cup	152	(Germany) Jesko Herrmann	4
(Germany) Sorg Rennsport	BMW M235i Racing Cup	152	(Germany) Dirk Bierbaum	4
(Germany) Sorg Rennsport	BMW M235i Racing Cup	152	(Portugal) José Pires	4
(Germany) Sorg Rennsport	BMW M235i Racing Cup	152	(Portugal) Paulo Macedo	4
(Germany) Sorg Rennsport	BMW M235i Racing Cup	152	(United States) Edward Nakato	6
(Germany) Sorg Rennsport	BMW M235i Racing Cup	152	(United States) Scott Peterson	6
(Germany) Sorg Rennsport	BMW M235i Racing Cup	152	(United States) JB Knopp	6
(Belgium) QSR Racingschool	BMW M235i Racing Cup	154	(Belgium) Tom Boonen	1
(Belgium) QSR Racingschool	BMW M235i Racing Cup	154	(Belgium) Jimmy De Breucker	1
(Belgium) QSR Racingschool	BMW M235i Racing Cup	154	(Belgium) Rodrigue Gillion	1
(Belgium) QSR Racingschool	BMW M235i Racing Cup	154	(Germany) Simon Klemund	1
(Belgium) QSR Racingschool	BMW M235i Racing Cup	154	(Belgium) Mario Timmers	1
(Belgium) JJ Motorsport	BMW M235i Racing Cup	156	(United States) Paul Dubinsky	6
(Belgium) JJ Motorsport	BMW M235i Racing Cup	156	(United States) Rob Gill	6
(Belgium) JJ Motorsport	BMW M235i Racing Cup	156	(United States) John Landrum	6
(Belgium) JJ Motorsport	BMW M235i Racing Cup	156	(United Kingdom) Alastair McEwan	6
(Luxembourg) DUWO Racing	BMW M235i Racing Cup	235	(France) Thierry Chkondali	1
(Luxembourg) DUWO Racing	BMW M235i Racing Cup	235	(France) Bruno Derossi	1
(Luxembourg) DUWO Racing	BMW M235i Racing Cup	235	(Luxembourg) Jean-Marie Dumont	1
(Luxembourg) DUWO Racing	BMW M235i Racing Cup	235	(France) Frédéric Schmit	1
(Luxembourg) DUWO Racing	BMW M235i Racing Cup	235	(France) Nicolas Schmit	1
(Luxembourg) DUWO Racing	BMW M235i Racing Cup	235	(United Kingdom) Grahame Bryant	2
(Luxembourg) DUWO Racing	BMW M235i Racing Cup	235	(United Kingdom) Oliver Bryant	2
(Luxembourg) DUWO Racing	BMW M235i Racing Cup	235	(United Kingdom) Adam Dawson	2
(Luxembourg) DUWO Racing	BMW M235i Racing Cup	235	(United Kingdom) Philip Harris	2
(Luxembourg) DUWO Racing	BMW M235i Racing Cup	235	(United Kingdom) William Plant	2
A2
(United Kingdom) Ciceley Motorsport	Renault Clio Cup (IV)	162	(United Kingdom) Frank Bird	1
(United Kingdom) Ciceley Motorsport	Renault Clio Cup (IV)	162	(United Kingdom) Max Bird	1
(United Kingdom) Ciceley Motorsport	Renault Clio Cup (IV)	162	(United Kingdom) Jake Giddings	1
(United Kingdom) Ciceley Motorsport	Renault Clio Cup (IV)	162	(United Kingdom) Adam Morgan	1
(United Kingdom) Ciceley Motorsport	Renault Clio Cup (IV)	164	(United Kingdom) Max Coates	1
(United Kingdom) Ciceley Motorsport	Renault Clio Cup (IV)	164	(United Kingdom) Adam Hatfield	1
(United Kingdom) Ciceley Motorsport	Renault Clio Cup (IV)	164	(Denmark) Steffan Jusjong	1
(United Kingdom) Ciceley Motorsport	Renault Clio Cup (IV)	164	(Germany) Harald Rettich	1
(Denmark) Jönsson Consulting	Peugeot RCZ	171	(Denmark) Kasper Bruun	1
(Denmark) Jönsson Consulting	Peugeot RCZ	171	(Denmark) Christian Hansen	1
(Denmark) Jönsson Consulting	Peugeot RCZ	171	(Denmark) Søren Jönsson	1
(Denmark) Jönsson Consulting	Peugeot RCZ	171	(Denmark) Lars Mogensen	1
(Denmark) Jönsson Consulting	Peugeot RCZ	171	(Denmark) Niels Nyboe	1

== Race results ==
Bold indicates overall winner.

Classes	(United Arab Emirates) 24h Dubai (Round 1)	(United Kingdom) 24h Silverstone (Round 2)	(Italy) 12h Imola (Round 3)	(Portugal) 24h Portimão (Round 4)	(Spain) 24h Barcelona (Round 5)	(Belgium) 12h Spa (Round 6)	(United States) 24h Austin (Round 7)
TCR Winners	**(Germany) No. 130 Liqui Moly Team Engstler**	**(Netherlands) No. 303 Red Camel-Jordans.nl**	**(Finland) No. 129 LMS Racing** **by Bas Koeten Racing**	**(Netherlands) No. 155 Kawasaki Racing** **by Bas Koeten Racing**	**(Spain) No. 108 Cupra Racing - Monlau Competición**	(Netherlands) No. 175 NKPP Racing by Bas Koeten Racing	**(Finland) No. 129 LMS Racing** **by Bas Koeten Racing**
TCR Winners	**(Germany) Luca Engstler** **(Germany) Benjamin Leuchter** **(Switzerland) Florian Thoma** **(France) Jean-Karl Vernay**	**(Netherlands) Ivo Breukers** **(Netherlands) Rik Breukers** **(Latvia) Konstantīns Calko**	**(Finland) Antti Buri** **(Finland) Olli Parhankangas**	**(Finland) Antti Buri** **(Denmark) Kristian Jepsen** **(Finland) Kari-Pekka Laaksonen** **(Denmark) Jan Sorensen**	**(Spain) Jordi Gené** **(Spain) Francesc Gutierrez Agüi** **(Spain) Alba Cano Ramirez** **(Spain) Laia Sanz**	(Netherlands) Gijs Bessem (Netherlands) Harry Hilders	**(Finland) Antti Buri** **(Switzerland) Ronny Jost** **(Finland) Kari-Pekka Laaksonen** **(Finland) Olli Parhankangas**
SP3 Winners	(United Kingdom) No. 178 CWS Engineering	No entries	(Denmark) No. 786 Scangrip Racing	(France) No. 238 LAMERA-CUP powered by CTF Performance	(United Kingdom) No. 178 CWS Engineering	**(United Kingdom) No. 178 CWS Engineering**	(Netherlands) No. 71 Cor Euser Racing
SP3 Winners	(United Kingdom) Jac Constable (South Africa) Bradley Liebenberg (South Africa) Simon Murray (United Kingdom) Colin White	No entries	(Denmark) Niels Borum (New Zealand) Michael Eden	(France) Nicolas Beraud (France) Fabien Delaplace (France) Laurent Piguet (France) Gilles Poret	(United Kingdom) James May (United Kingdom) Paul May (United Kingdom) Steven Wells (United Kingdom) Colin White	**(United Kingdom) James May** **(United Kingdom) Colin White**	(United States) Jim Briody (Netherlands) Niels Bouwhuis (Netherlands) Cor Euser (Norway) Einar Thorsen
A3 Winners	No entries	(Switzerland) No. 131 Hofor Racing powered bei Bonk Motorsport	No entries		(Switzerland) No. 131 Hofor Racing powered by Bonk Motorsport	(United Kingdom) No. 76 Synchro Motorsport	No entries
A3 Winners	No entries	(Austria) Gustav Engljähringer (Austria) Michael Fischer (Switzerland) Martin Kroll (Germany) Bernd Küpper (Germany) Michael Schrey	No entries		(Austria) Gustav Engljähringer (Austria) Michael Fischer (Switzerland) Martin Kroll (Germany) Bernd Küpper (Germany) Michael Schrey	(United Kingdom) Alyn James (United Kingdom) Matt Neal (United Kingdom) Daniel Wheeler	No entries
CUP1 Winners	(Switzerland) No. 131 Hofor Racing powered by Bonk Motorsport	Merged with A3 class	(Switzerland) No. 131 Hofor Racing powered by Bonk Motorsport	(Switzerland) No. 131 Hofor Racing powered by Bonk Motorsport	Merged with A3 class	(Switzerland) No. 131 Hofor Racing powered by Bonk Motorsport	(Switzerland) No. 131 Hofor Racing powered by Bonk Motorsport
CUP1 Winners	(Austria) Gustav Engljähringer (Austria) Michael Fischer (Switzerland) Martin Kroll (Germany) Bernd Küpper (Germany) Michael Schrey	Merged with A3 class	(Austria) Gustav Engljähringer (Austria) Michael Fischer (Switzerland) Martin Kroll (Germany) Bernd Küpper (Germany) Michael Schrey	(Austria) Gustav Engljähringer (Austria) Michael Fischer (Switzerland) Martin Kroll (Germany) Bernd Küpper (Germany) Michael Schrey	Merged with A3 class	(Austria) Gustav Engljähringer (Austria) Michael Fischer (Switzerland) Martin Kroll (Germany) Bernd Küpper (Germany) Michael Schrey	(Austria) Gustav Engljähringer (Austria) Michael Fischer (Switzerland) Martin Kroll (Germany) Bernd Küpper (Germany) Michael Schrey
A2 Winners	(United Kingdom) No. 162 Ciceley Motorsport	No entries					
A2 Winners	(United Kingdom) Frank Bird (United Kingdom) Max Bird (United Kingdom) Jake Giddings (United Kingdom) Adam Morgan	No entries					

== See also ==
- Touring Car Endurance Series
- 2018 24H GT Series
- 2018 24H Proto Series
- 2018 Dubai 24 Hour
