= 2016 European Touring Car Cup =

Motorsport contest

The 2016 FIA European Touring Car Cup was the twelfth running of the FIA European Touring Car Cup. It consisted of six events in France (twice), Slovakia, Germany, Portugal and Italy.

The championship was split into two categories: Super 2000 (including TC2 Turbo, TC2 and TCN-2 machinery) and Super 1600.

== Teams and drivers ==
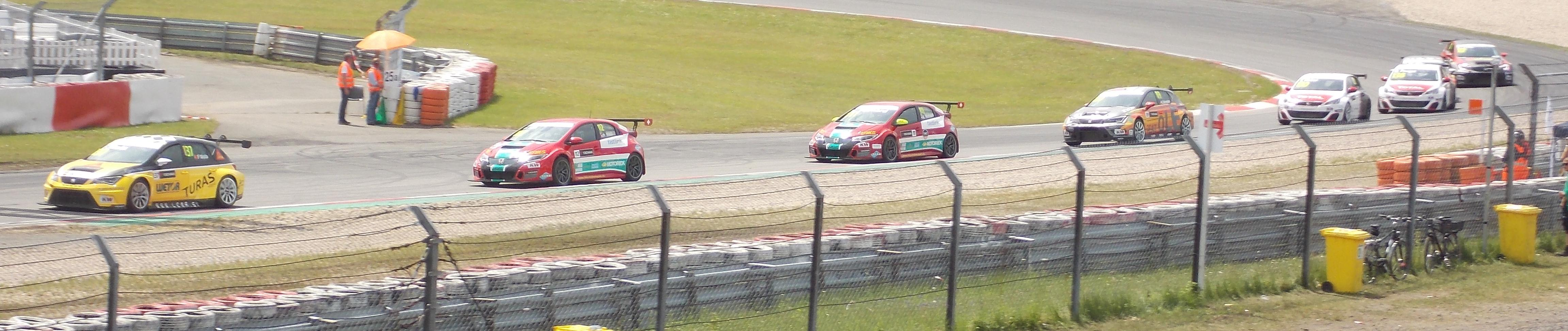
The field of the 2016 ETCC season in Race 1 on the Nürburgring.

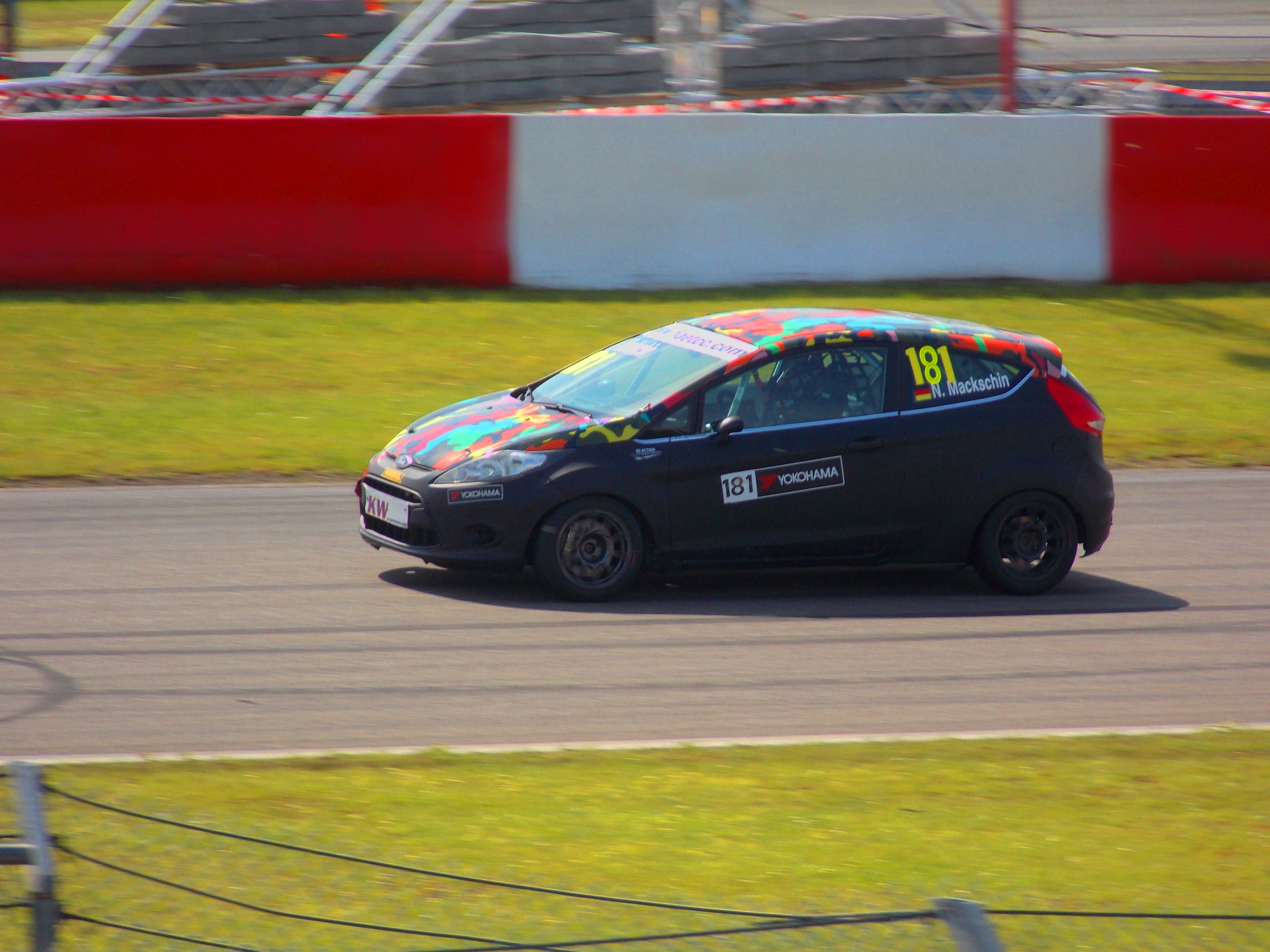
Niklas Mackschin in Race 1 on Nürburgring Nordschleife of 2016 ETCC season.

The races at the Nürburgring had both WTCC and ETCC competitors. ETCC competitors entered with their usual car numbers, but with 100 added up to it.

Super 2000
Team	Car	No.	Drivers	Rounds
(France) JSB Compétition	SEAT León Cup Racer	2	(France) Pierre Etiene Chaumat	5
(Germany) ADAC Team Hessen-Thüringen	SEAT León Cup Racer	4	(Germany) Andreas Pfister	6
(Germany) ADAC Team Hessen-Thüringen	SEAT León Cup Racer	7	(Germany) Pierre Humbert	1
(Germany) ADAC Team Hessen-Thüringen	SEAT León Cup Racer	9	(Austria) Wolfgang Kriegl	2
(Hungary) Zengő Motorsport	SEAT León Cup Racer	8	(Hungary) Norbert Nagy	All
(Switzerland) Rikli Motorsport	Honda Civic TCR	11	(Switzerland) Kris Richard	All
(Switzerland) Rikli Motorsport	Honda Civic TCR	12	(Switzerland) Peter Rikli	All
(Switzerland) Rikli Motorsport	Honda Civic TCR	24	(Finland) Aku Pellinen	6
(Switzerland) Rikli Motorsport	Honda Civic TCR	72	(Switzerland) Claudio Truffer	6
(Switzerland) Rikli Motorsport	SEAT León Cup Racer	75	(Switzerland) Adrian Spescha	6
(Serbia) ASK Lein Racing	SEAT León Cup Racer	14	(North Macedonia) Igor Stefanovski	6
(Serbia) ASK Lein Racing	SEAT León Cup Racer	17	(Serbia) Mladen Lalušić	1–5
(Slovenia) Lema Racing	SEAT León Cup Racer	14	(North Macedonia) Igor Stefanovski	1–4
(Slovenia) Lema Racing	SEAT León Cup Racer	27	(Slovenia) Boštjan Avbelj	6
(Slovenia) Lema Racing	SEAT León Cup Racer	37	(Portugal) Fábio Mota	All
(Czech Republic) Krenek Motorsport	SEAT León Cup Racer	19	(Switzerland) Christjohannes Schreiber	All
(Czech Republic) Krenek Motorsport	SEAT León Cup Racer	22	(Czech Republic) Petr Fulín	All
(Portugal) Speedy Motorsport	SEAT León Cup Racer	55	(Portugal) Manuel Pedro Fernandes	4
(Spain) Baporo Motorsport	SEAT León Cup Racer	73	(Kazakhstan) Alexandr Artemyev	1
(Germany) ALL-INKL.COM Münnich Motorsport	Honda Civic TCR	77	(Germany) René Münnich	1
(France) Sébastien Loeb Racing	Peugeot 308 Racing Cup	130	(France) Teddy Clairet	3
(France) Sébastien Loeb Racing	Peugeot 308 Racing Cup	138	(France) David Pouget	3
Super 1600
Team	Car	No.	Drivers	Rounds
(Germany) RAVENOL Motorsport	Ford Fiesta 1.6 16V	81	(Germany) Niklas Mackschin	All
(Germany) RAVENOL Motorsport	Ford Fiesta 1.6 16V	82	(Ukraine) Ksenia Niks	All
(Germany) RAVENOL Motorsport	Ford Fiesta 1.6 16V	83	(Germany) Daniel Niermann	All
(Germany) RAVENOL Motorsport	Ford Fiesta 1.6 16V	84	(Germany) Ulrike Krafft	1–3, 6
(Germany) RAVENOL Motorsport	Ford Fiesta 1.6 16V	85	(Czech Republic) Tomáš Korený	1–2, 4–6
(Germany) ETH Tuning	Peugeot 207 Sport	86	(Germany) Andreas Rinke	All
(Germany) ETH Tuning	Peugeot 207 Sport	88	(Germany) Kevin Hilgenhövel	1–2, 4–6
(Germany) ETH Tuning	Peugeot 207 Sport	187	(Austria) David Griessner	3
(Ukraine) Master KR Racing	Ford Fiesta 1.6 16V	95	(Ukraine) Sergii Kravets	2–3
(Ukraine) Master KR Racing	Ford Fiesta 1.6 16V	97	(Ukraine) Pavlo Kopylets	2–3
(Ukraine) Master KR Racing	Ford Fiesta 1.6 16V	99	(Ukraine) Andrii Ievtushenko	1–2

== Race calendar and results ==
The first four rounds were supporting the World Touring Car Championship, whereas the final two rounds were jointly with the FFSA GT Tour.

Round		Circuit	Date	Pole position	Fastest lap	Winning S2000	Winning S1600
1	R1	(France) Circuit Paul Ricard	3 April	(Germany) René Münnich	(Switzerland) Kris Richard	(Czech Republic) Petr Fulín	(Germany) Niklas Mackschin
1	R2	(France) Circuit Paul Ricard	3 April		(Czech Republic) Petr Fulín	(Czech Republic) Petr Fulín	(Germany) Niklas Mackschin
2	R1	Automotodróm Slovakia Ring	17 April	(Switzerland) Christjohannes Schreiber	(Switzerland) Christjohannes Schreiber	(Switzerland) Kris Richard	(Germany) Ulrike Krafft
2	R2	Automotodróm Slovakia Ring	17 April		(Switzerland) Christjohannes Schreiber	(Switzerland) Kris Richard	(Germany) Niklas Mackschin
3	R1	(Germany) Nürburgring Nordschleife	28 May	(Czech Republic) Petr Fulín	(Switzerland) Kris Richard	(Czech Republic) Petr Fulín	(Austria) David Griessner
3	R2	(Germany) Nürburgring Nordschleife	28 May		(Switzerland) Kris Richard	(Switzerland) Kris Richard	(Germany) Niklas Mackschin
4	R1	(Portugal) Circuito Internacional de Vila Real	26 June	(Hungary) Norbert Nagy	(Hungary) Norbert Nagy	(Portugal) Manuel Pedro Fernandes	(Germany) Niklas Mackschin
4	R2	(Portugal) Circuito Internacional de Vila Real	26 June		(Czech Republic) Petr Fulín	(Switzerland) Kris Richard	(Germany) Niklas Mackschin
5	R1	(France) Circuit de Nevers Magny-Cours	10 July	(Switzerland) Kris Richard	(Switzerland) Kris Richard	(Czech Republic) Petr Fulín	(Czech Republic) Tomáš Korený
5	R2	(France) Circuit de Nevers Magny-Cours	10 July		(Czech Republic) Petr Fulín	(Switzerland) Kris Richard	(Germany) Kevin Hilgenhövel
6	R1	(Italy) Autodromo Enzo e Dino Ferrari	2 October	(Finland) Aku Pellinen	(North Macedonia) Igor Stefanovski	(North Macedonia) Igor Stefanovski	(Germany) Niklas Mackschin
6	R2	(Italy) Autodromo Enzo e Dino Ferrari	2 October		(Czech Republic) Petr Fulín	(Czech Republic) Petr Fulín	(Germany) Niklas Mackschin

== Championship standings ==
Points were awarded to the top eight classified finishers using the following structure:

Position	**1st**	**2nd**	**3rd**	**4th**	**5th**	**6th**	**7th**	**8th**
Points	10	8	6	5	4	3	2	1

Qualifying points: ^{1} ^{2} ^{3} refers to the classification of the drivers after the qualifying for first race, where bonus points are awarded 3–2–1.

Pos	Driver	LEC (France)		SVK (Slovakia)		NÜR (Germany)		VIL‡ (Portugal)		MAG (France)		IMO (Italy)		Pts
Super 2000
1	(Switzerland) Kris Richard	5	Ret	1	1	2^{2}	1	4	1	4^{1}	1	2^{3}	2	109
2	(Czech Republic) Petr Fulín	1^{2}	1	EX^{2}	4	**1**^{1}	3	2^{3}	6	**1**^{2}	2	4^{2}	1	109
3	(Hungary) Norbert Nagy	4^{3}	3	4	7	Ret^{3}	DNS	11^{1}†	3	3	5	6	8	58
4	(Switzerland) Peter Rikli	3	2	2	2	5	6	3	Ret	13	3	10	16	57
5	(Portugal) Manuel Pedro Fernandes							1^{2}	2					40
6	(Serbia) Mladen Lalušić	6	5	5	3	8	**7**	5	5	5	Ret			40
7	(Portugal) Fábio Mota	9	Ret	3^{3}	5	7	EX	Ret	4	6	Ret	8	4	32
8	(Switzerland) Christjohannes Schreiber	7	8	**EX**^{1}	6	6	2	13†	Ret	Ret	DNS	5	9	28
9	(Finland) Aku Pellinen											3^{1}	3	15
10	(North Macedonia) Igor Stefanovski	11	7	7	**Ret**	Ret	DNS	DNS	DNS			1	Ret	14
11	(France) Pierre Etiene Chaumat									2^{3}	4			14
12	(Germany) René Münnich	**2**^{1}	9											11
13	(France) Teddy Clairet					3	4							11
14	(France) David Pouget					4	5							9
15	(Kazakhstan) Alexandr Artemyev	8	**4**											6
16	(Germany) Andreas Pfister											11	5	4
17	(Austria) Wolfgang Kriegl			6	8									4
18	(Slovenia) Boštjan Avbelj											9	6	3
19	(Germany) Pierre Humbert	10	6											3
20	(Switzerland) Adrian Spescha											12	7	2
21	(Switzerland) Claudio Truffer											7	Ret	2
Super 1600
1	(Germany) Niklas Mackschin	**12**^{1}	**10**	9^{3}	9	**Ret**^{1}	**8**	6^{1}	7	9^{3}	7	13^{2}	10	138
2	(Germany) Andreas Rinke	14^{3}	14	11	12	10^{3}	9	9	8	10	9	16	11	85
3	(Germany) Kevin Hilgenhövel	16	15	Ret	11			7^{2}	9	8^{2}	6	14^{1}	13	81
4	(Czech Republic) Tomáš Korený	13	13	10	13			8^{3}	Ret	**7**^{1}	8	15	12	71
5	(Ukraine) Ksenia Niks	18	Ret	13	16	DNS	DNS	10	10	11	10	18	15	38
6	(Germany) Daniel Niermann	19	16	14	15	12	12	12	11	12	Ret	17	Ret	37
7	(Germany) Ulrike Krafft	17^{2}	12	**8**^{1}	**10**	DNS	DNS					Ret	14	36
8	(Ukraine) Andrii Ievtushenko	15	11	Ret^{2}	Ret									16
9	(Austria) David Griessner					9^{2}	EX							12
10	(Ukraine) Pavlo Kopylets			Ret	Ret	11	10							12
11	(Ukraine) Sergii Kravets			12	14	Ret	11							12
Pos	Driver	LEC (France)		SVK (Slovakia)		NÜR (Germany)		VIL‡ (Portugal)		MAG (France)		IMO (Italy)		Pts

Colour	Result
Gold	Winner
Silver	Second place
Bronze	Third place
Green	Points classification
Blue	Non-points classification
Blue	Non-classified finish (NC)
Purple	Retired, not classified (Ret)
Red	Did not qualify (DNQ)
Red	Did not pre-qualify (DNPQ)
Black	Disqualified (DSQ)
White	Did not start (DNS)
White	Withdrew (WD)
White	Race cancelled (C)
Blank	Did not practice (DNP)
Blank	Did not arrive (DNA)
Blank	Excluded (EX)

**Bold** – Pole
Italics – Fastest Lap

† — Drivers did not finish the race, but were classified as they completed over 75% of the race distance.
‡ — Double points were awarded.
