= 2012 Formula LO season =

Motorsport season

2012 Formula LO

Seasons
- ← 2011 none →

The 2012 Formula LO season was the inaugural Formula LO season and the thirteenth season of the former Formula Lista Junior. It began on 19 May at the Red Bull Ring and ended on 13 October at Autodromo Nazionale Monza after twelve races.

== Teams and drivers ==
- All cars were powered by BMW engines, and Mygale FB02 chassis.

Team	No.	Driver	Rounds
(Germany) GU-Racing	70	(Switzerland) Cédric Freiburghaus	All
(Germany) GU-Racing	71	(Germany) Freddy Killensberger	All
(Germany) GU-Racing	80	(Switzerland) Levin Amweg	All
(Germany) Tima Motorsport	72	(Germany) Marvin Tenhaft	1–2
(Switzerland) Daltec Racing	72	(Germany) Marvin Tenhaft	3–6
(Switzerland) Daltec Racing	82	(Switzerland) Kris Richard	All
(Switzerland) Jo Zeller Racing	74	(Germany) Max Schaumburg-Lippe	4–6
(Switzerland) Felix Racing	81	(Switzerland) Marcel Felix	3–6
(Switzerland) Felix Racing	88	(Switzerland) Jan Schwitter	4–6
(Germany) KUG-Gewinnus-Motorsport	83	(Germany) Nicolas Pohler	3, 6
(Austria) HS Engineering	84	(Germany) Felix Wieland	1, 3–4, 6
(Austria) HS Engineering	85	(Denmark) Nicolas Beer	4
(Austria) HS Engineering	86	(Germany) Fabian Hamprecht	3–4
(Austria) HS Engineering	87	(Germany) Sebastian von Gartzen	4
(Austria) Ofner	85	(Austria) Oliver Ofner	1
(Sweden) Mirage Motor Company	90	(Sweden) Erik Johansson	6

== Race calendar and results ==
Round		Circuit	Date	Pole position	Fastest lap	Winning driver	Winning team
1	R1	(Austria) Red Bull Ring, Spielberg	19 May	(Switzerland) Cédric Freiburghaus	(Switzerland) Levin Amweg	(Germany) Felix Wieland	(Austria) HS Engineering
1	R2	(Austria) Red Bull Ring, Spielberg	20 May	(Switzerland) Levin Amweg	(Germany) Freddy Killensberger	(Switzerland) Levin Amweg	(Germany) GU-Racing
2	R1	(Italy) Autodromo Riccardo Paletti, Varano	9 June	(Switzerland) Levin Amweg	(Switzerland) Levin Amweg	(Switzerland) Levin Amweg	(Germany) GU-Racing
2	R2	(Italy) Autodromo Riccardo Paletti, Varano	10 June	(Switzerland) Levin Amweg	(Switzerland) Levin Amweg	(Switzerland) Levin Amweg	(Germany) GU-Racing
3	R1	(Germany) Lausitzring	22 June	(Switzerland) Levin Amweg	(Switzerland) Levin Amweg	(Germany) Nicolas Pohler	(Germany) KUG-Gewinnus-Motorsport
3	R2	(Germany) Lausitzring	23 June	(Switzerland) Levin Amweg	(Switzerland) Levin Amweg	(Switzerland) Levin Amweg	(Germany) GU-Racing
4	R1	(Czech Republic) Autodrom Most	4 August	(Switzerland) Levin Amweg	(Switzerland) Levin Amweg	(Denmark) Nicolas Beer	(Austria) HS Engineering
4	R2	(Czech Republic) Autodrom Most	5 August	(Switzerland) Jan Schwitter	(Switzerland) Levin Amweg	(Denmark) Nicolas Beer	(Austria) HS Engineering
5	R1	(France) Dijon-Prenois	9 September	(Switzerland) Jan Schwitter	(Switzerland) Levin Amweg	(Switzerland) Jan Schwitter	(Switzerland) Felix Racing
5	R2	(France) Dijon-Prenois	9 September	(Switzerland) Kris Richard	(Switzerland) Levin Amweg	(Switzerland) Kris Richard	(Switzerland) Daltec Racing
6	R1	(Germany) Hockenheimring	12 October	(Switzerland) Kris Richard	(Switzerland) Levin Amweg	(Germany) Nicolas Pohler	(Germany) KUG-Gewinnus-Motorsport
6	R2	(Germany) Hockenheimring	13 October	(Switzerland) Kris Richard	(Switzerland) Jan Schwitter	(Switzerland) Cédric Freiburghaus	(Germany) GU-Racing

== Championship standings ==
=== Drivers' championship ===
Position	1st	2nd	3rd	4th	5th	6th	7th	8th	9th	10th	Pole position	Fastest lap
Points	20	15	12	10	8	6	4	3	2	1	**2**	2

Pos	Driver	RBR (Austria)		VAR (Italy)		LAU (Germany)		MOS (Czech Republic)		DIJ (France)		HOC (Germany)		Pts
1	(Switzerland) Levin Amweg	6	**1**	**1**	**1**	**2**	**1**	**8**	2	2	2	2	7	226
2	(Germany) Freddy Killensberger	2	3	2	4	4	3	10	6	7	4	4	4	137
3	(Switzerland) Kris Richard	DNS	4	DNS	2	3	6	5	3	3	**1**	**5**	**3**	137
4	(Switzerland) Cédric Freiburghaus	**5**	5	3	3	Ret	5	4	5	5	7	6	1	125
5	(Switzerland) Jan Schwitter							3	**4**	**1**	3	3	2	101
6	(Germany) Marvin Tenhaft	3	Ret	4	5	7	7	9	9	4	5	Ret	9	84
7	(Germany) Max Schaumburg-Lippe							7	8	6	6	7	5	42
8	(Switzerland) Marcel Felix					Ret	9	Ret	10	Ret	Ret	8	8	17
guest drivers ineligible for points
	(Germany) Nicolas Pohler					1	2					1	Ret	0
	(Denmark) Nicolas Beer							1	1					0
	(Germany) Felix Wieland	1	2			5	8	6	7			Ret	6	0
	(Germany) Sebastian van Gartzen							2	Ret					0
	(Austria) Oliver Ofner	4	6											0
	(Germany) Fabian Hamprecht					6	4	11	Ret					0
	(Sweden) Erik Johansson											9	Ret	0
Pos	Driver	RBR (Austria)		VAR (Italy)		LAU (Germany)		MOS (Czech Republic)		DIJ (France)		HOC (Germany)		Pts

Colour	Result
Gold	Winner
Silver	Second place
Bronze	Third place
Green	Points classification
Blue	Non-points classification
Blue	Non-classified finish (NC)
Purple	Retired, not classified (Ret)
Red	Did not qualify (DNQ)
Red	Did not pre-qualify (DNPQ)
Black	Disqualified (DSQ)
White	Did not start (DNS)
White	Withdrew (WD)
White	Race cancelled (C)
Blank	Did not practice (DNP)
Blank	Did not arrive (DNA)
Blank	Excluded (EX)

**Bold** – Pole
Italics – Fastest Lap

=== Rookies' Championship ===
Pos	Team	Points
1	(Germany) Freddy Killensberger	104
2	(Switzerland) Cédric Freiburghaus	91
3	(Germany) Marvin Tenhaft	68
4	(Germany) Max Schaumburg-Lippe	44

=== Teams' Championship ===
Pos	Team	Points
1	(Germany) GU-Racing	114
2	(Switzerland) Daltec Racing	72
3	(Switzerland) Felix Racing	54
4	(Switzerland) Jo Zeller Racing	30
5	(Germany) Tima Motorsport	22
