= Kris Richard (racing driver) =

Swiss racing driver (born 1994)

- Nationality: (Switzerland) Swiss
- Born: 20 November 1994 (age 31) Bern, Switzerland

TCR Europe Series career
- Debut season: 2018
- Current team: Target Competition
- Categorisation: FIA Silver
- Car number: 94
- Starts: 4
- Fastest laps: 1

Previous series
- 2018 2018 2018 2017 2017 2016 2016 2011–12 2005, 07–08: World Touring Car Cup; Touring Car Endurance Series; VLN; ADAC TCR Germany Series; World Touring Car Championship; European Touring Car Cup; TCR BeNeLux Series; Formula LO; Karting

Championship titles
- 2016: European Touring Car Cup

Kris Richard (born 20 November 1994) is a Swiss racing driver currently competing in the TCR Europe Series. Having previously competed in the World Touring Car Cup, World Touring Car Championship and European Touring Car Cup amongst others.

== Racing career ==
Richard began his career in 2005 in Karting, he continued in karting until 2008. In 2011, he switched to the Formula LO series, he finished the season seventh in the championship standings that year. He continued in the series for 2012, taking a single victory, several podiums and pole positions on his way to finishing third in the standings. For the 2016 season, he switched to the European Touring Car Cup, driving a Honda Civic TCR for Rikli Motorsport. He went on to take five victories, eight podiums and one pole position on his way to winning the 2016 drivers title. He also partnered Stéphane Lémeret in one round of the 2016 TCR BeNeLux Touring Car Championship. For 2017, he switched to the Champions, driving a Honda Civic Type R TCR (FK2) for Target Competition.

In October 2017, it was announced that Richard would race in the World Touring Car Championship replacing Esteban Guerrieri, driving a Chevrolet RML Cruze TC1 for Campos Racing as a prize for winning the 2016 European Touring Car Cup. He earned a second outing with team at the season finale held in Qatar, scoring his first and only WTCC points by finishing sixth in the second race. In 2018, he made a two one-off starts in the 24H TCE Series and in the VLN. After having competed in the Champions in 2017, he switched to the TCR Europe Series for 2018, once again driving for Target Competition, driving a Hyundai i30 N TCR. He later made a wildcard entry into the 2018 World Touring Car Cup race held at the Nürburgring Nordschleife with KCMG, driving a Honda Civic Type R TCR (FK8).

== Racing record ==
=== Career summary ===
Season	Series	Team	Races	Wins	Poles	F/Laps	Podiums	Points	Position
2011	Formula Lista Junior	Daltec Racing	10	0	0	0	2	78	7th
2012	Formula LO	Daltec Racing	10	1	3	0	6	137	**3rd**
2016	European Touring Car Cup - Super 2000	Rikli Motorsport	12	5	1	4	8	109	**1st**
2016	TCR BeNeLux Touring Car Championship	Boutsen Ginion Racing	3	0	0	0	2	94	16th
2017	World Touring Car Championship	Campos Racing	4	0	0	0	0	10	16th
2017	ADAC TCR Germany Touring Car Championship	Target Competition UK-SUI	14	0	1	0	1	178	10th
2018	World Touring Car Cup	KCMG	3	0	0	0	0	0	38th
2018	TCR Europe Touring Car Series	Target Competition	13	0	0	1	2	84	7th
2018	TCR Swiss Trophy	Target Competition	6	0	0	0	1	39	6th
2018	24H TCE Series - CUP1	Sorg Rennsport							
2019	Blancpain GT Series Endurance Cup	Daiko Lazarus Racing	2	0	0	0	0	0	NC
2020	NASCAR Whelen Euro Series - EuroNASCAR 2	DF1-MSM Racing	2	0	0	0	0	54	28th

=== Complete World Touring Car Championship results ===
(key) (Races in bold indicate pole position) (Races in italics indicate fastest lap)

Year	Team	Car	1	2	3	4	5	6	7	8	9	10	11	12	13	14	15	16	17	18	19	20	DC	Points
2017	Campos Racing	Chevrolet RML Cruze TC1	MAR; 1	MAR; 2	ITA; 1	ITA; 2	HUN; 1	HUN; 2	GER; 1	GER; 2	POR; 1	POR; 2	ARG; 1	ARG; 2	CHN; 1	CHN; 2	JPN; 1; 14	JPN; 2; 12	MAC; 1	MAC; 2	QAT; 1; 12	QAT; 2; 6	16th	10

=== Complete TCR Europe Series results ===
(key) (Races in bold indicate pole position) (Races in italics indicate fastest lap)

Year	Team	Car	1	2	3	4	5	6	7	8	9	10	11	12	13	14	DC	Points
2018	Target Competition	Hyundai i30 N TCR	LEC; 1; 12	LEC; 2; 14	ZAN; 1; 14^{4}	ZAN; 2; 5	SPA; 1; 6	SPA; 2; 2	HUN; 1; 5	HUN; 2; 7	ASS; 1; 3^{5}	ASS; 2; 6	MNZ; 1; 12	MNZ; 2; 7	CAT; 1 DSQ	CAT; 2 EX	7th	84

=== Complete World Touring Car Cup results ===
(key) (Races in bold indicate pole position) (Races in italics indicate fastest lap)

Year	Team	Car	1	2	3	4	5	6	7	8	9	10	11	12	13	14	15	16	17	18	19	20	21	22	23	24	25	26	27	28	29	30	DC	Points
2018	KCMG	Honda Civic Type R TCR	MAR; 1	MAR; 2	MAR; 3	HUN; 1	HUN; 2	HUN; 3	GER; 1; 17	GER; 2; 16	GER; 3; 18	NED; 1	NED; 2	NED; 3	POR; 1	POR; 2	POR; 3	SVK; 1	SVK; 2	SVK; 3	CHN; 1	CHN; 2	CHN; 3	WUH; 1	WUH; 2	WUH; 3	JPN; 1	JPN; 2	JPN; 3	MAC; 1	MAC; 2	MAC; 3	38th	0
