= Peugeot RCZ =

Peugeot RCZ (T75)
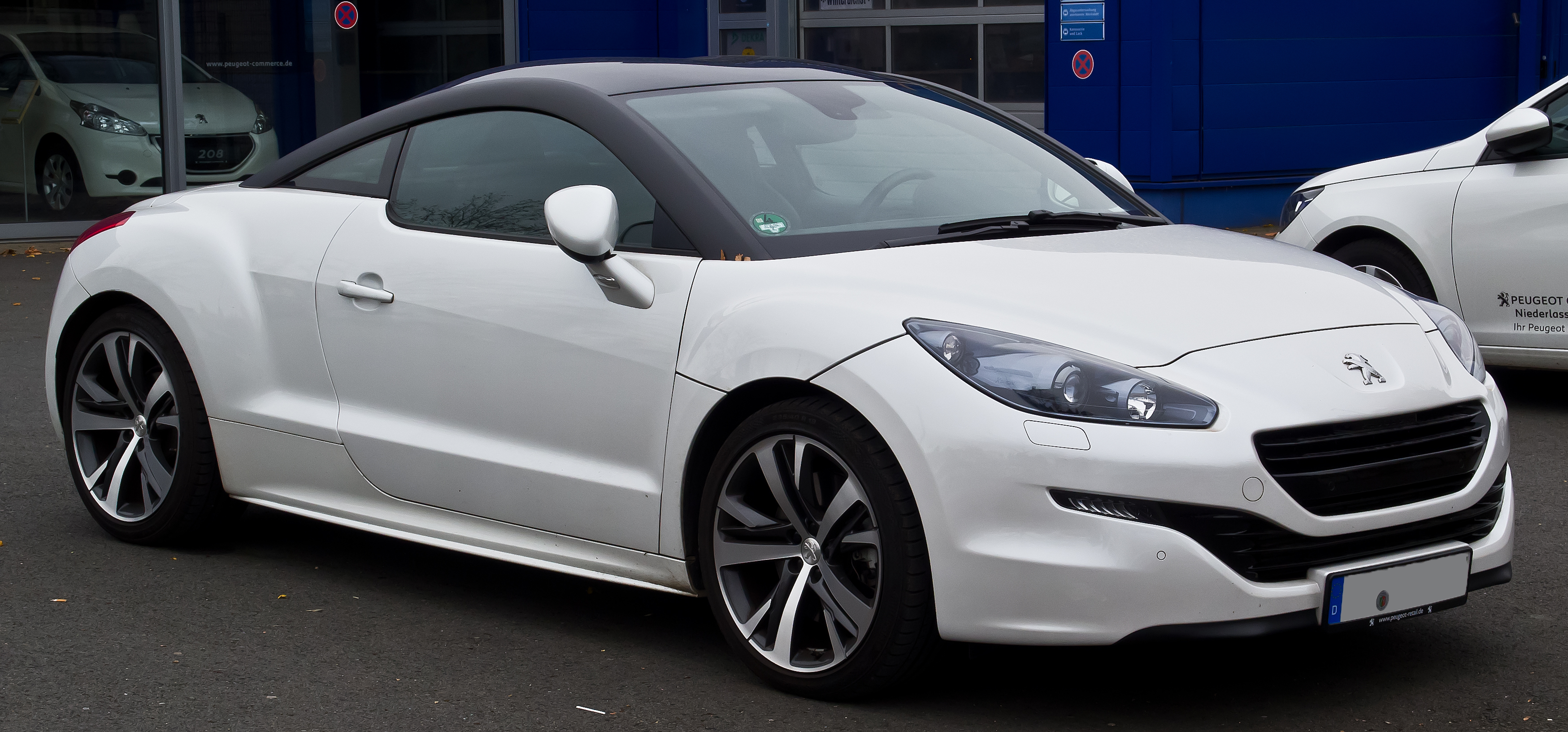
- facelifted Peugeot RCZ (Germany)

Overview
- Manufacturer: Peugeot
- Also called: Peugeot 308 RCZ (concept model)
- Production: 2009–2015
- Assembly: Austria: Graz (Magna Steyr)
- Designer: Boris Reinmöller

Body and chassis
- Class: Sport compact/Sports car
- Body style: 2-door 2+2 coupé
- Layout: Front-engine, front-wheel-drive
- Platform: PSA PF2 platform
- Related: Peugeot 308 (T7)

Powertrain
- Engine: Petrol: 1.6 L EP6 THP156 turbo I4; 1.6 L EP6 THP204 turbo I4; 1.6 L EP6CDTR THP270 turbo I4; Diesel: 2.0 HDi turbo I4
- Transmission: 6-speed manual 6-speed automatic

Dimensions
- Wheelbase: 2,612 mm (102.8 in)
- Length: 4,290 mm (168.9 in)
- Width: 1,845 mm (72.6 in)
- Height: 1,359 mm (53.5 in)
- Kerb weight: 1,394 kg (3,073 lb) (1.6); 1,474 kg (3,250 lb) (HDI)

The Peugeot RCZ is a car designed by French car brand Peugeot and assembled in Austria by Magna Steyr from 2009 until 2015. It is a sports coupé with a 2+2 seating layout and a front-engine, front-wheel-drive layout. This car was officially presented in 2009 at the Frankfurt Motor Show. The RCZ won numerous awards, the most important of which are five times the best sports car award by Diesel Car magazine and the 2010 coupe award by Top Gear.

== History ==
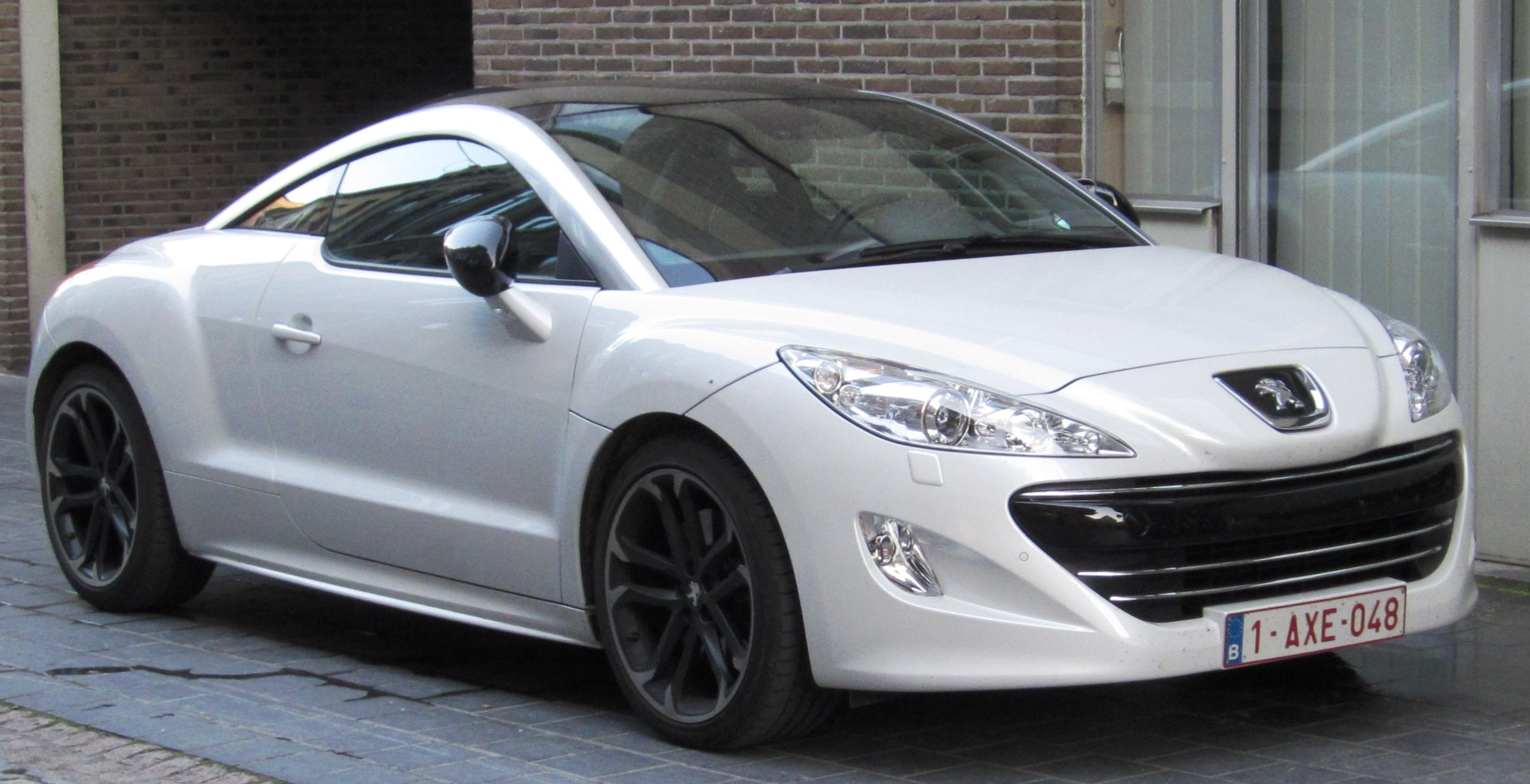

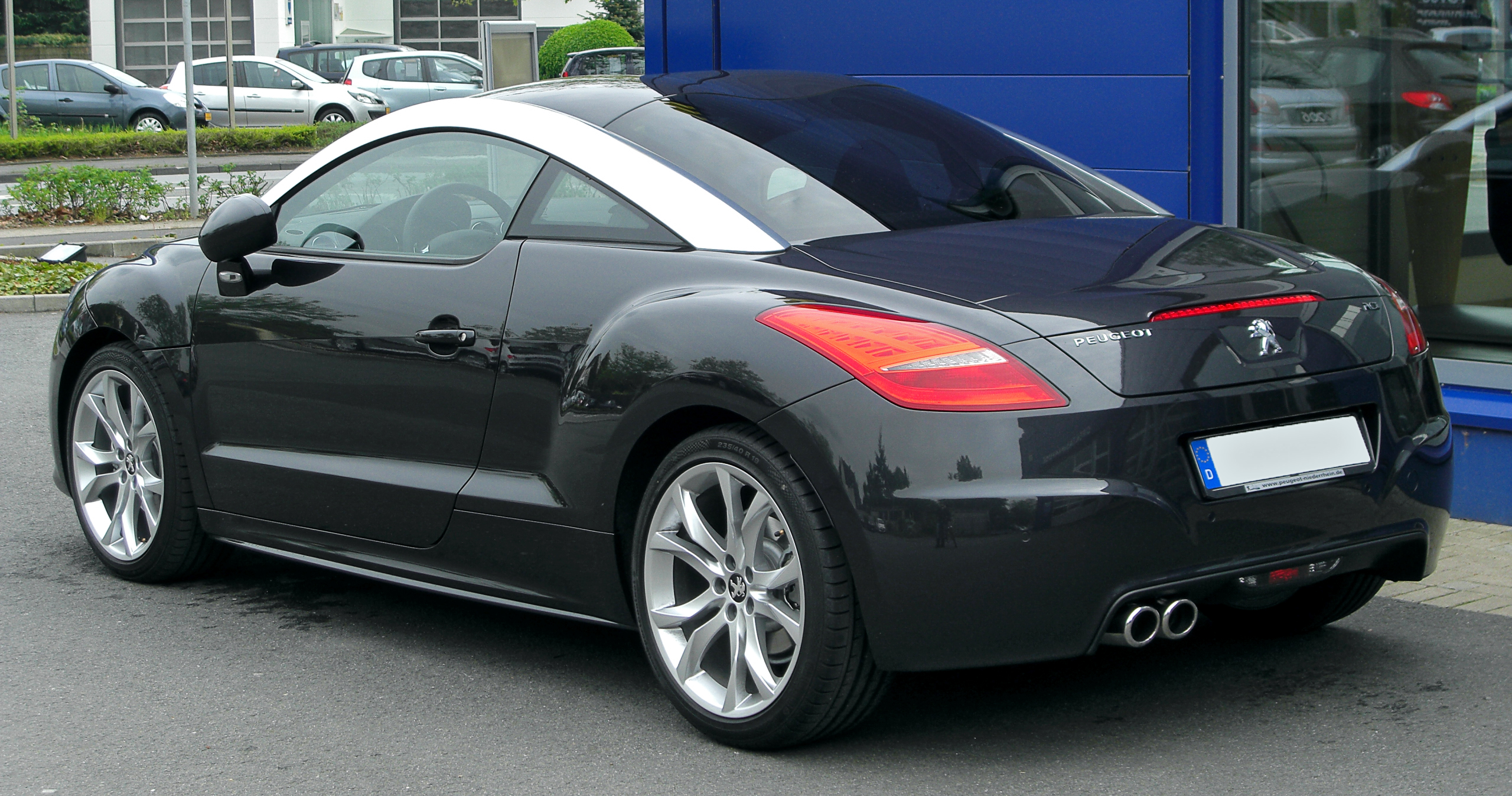
Peugeot RCZ (Europe; pre-facelift)

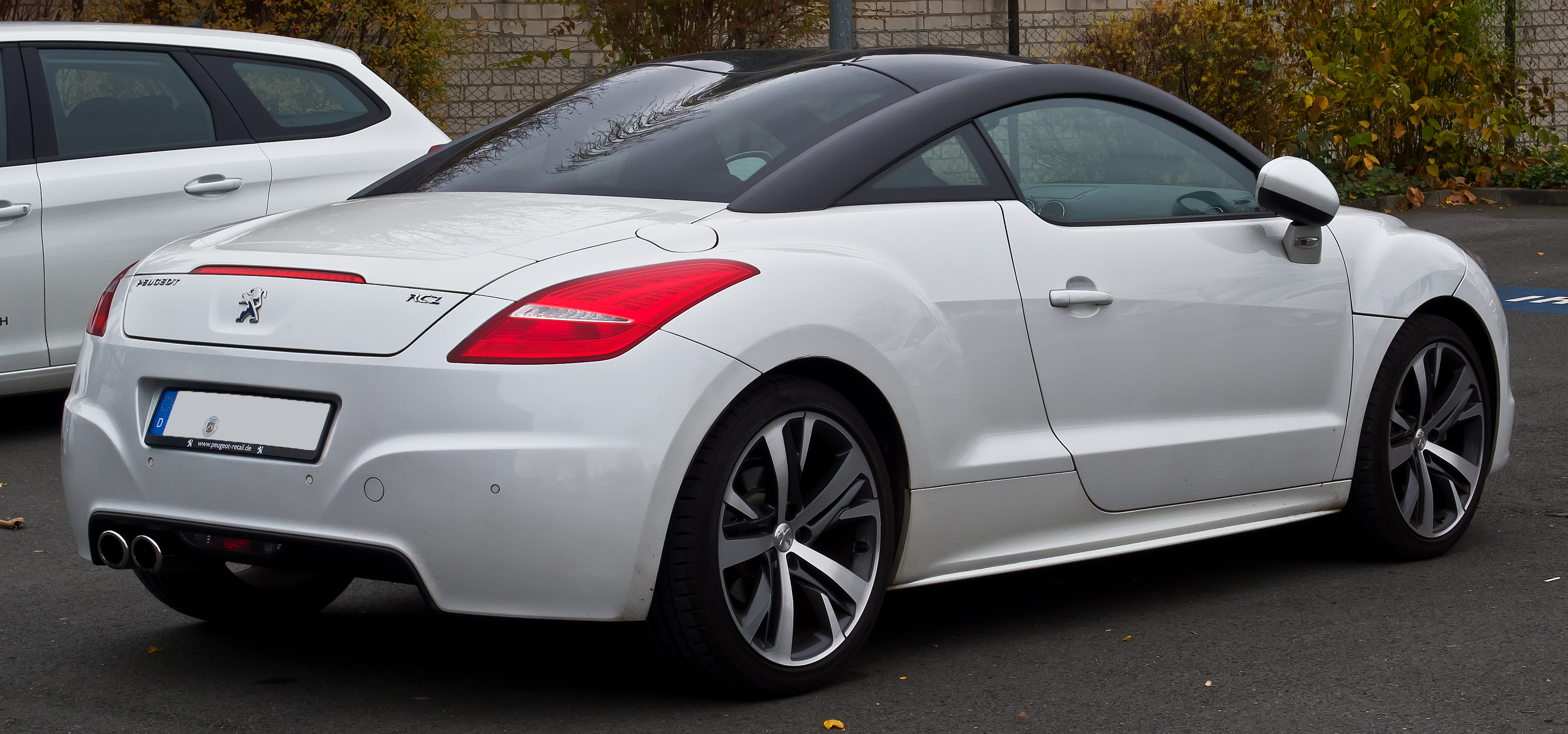
Facelifted Peugeot RCZ (Germany)

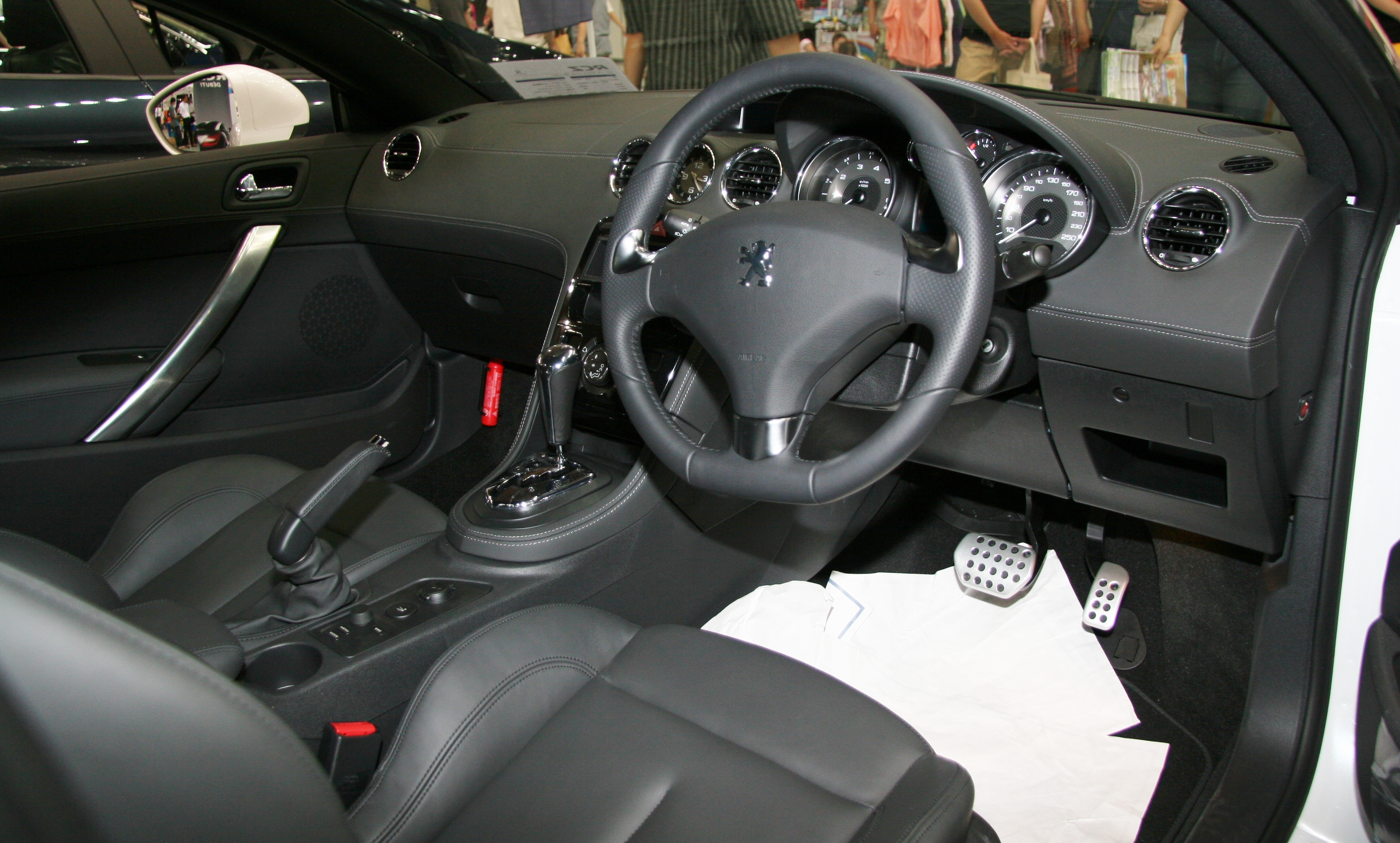
Interior

The vehicle was showcased as the 308 RCZ concept car at the 2007 Frankfurt Auto Show. The RCZ was developed as a showcase concept car but after receiving considerable critical acclaim, Peugeot put the RCZ into production, retaining much from the concept. The RCZ has a double-bubble roof inspired by Zagato.

The RCZ was formally introduced at the Frankfurt Auto Show in 2009 and launched into production late 2009. The vehicle was available in almost 80 countries by 2013. Petrol engines are based on Prince series while diesel is part of the HDi series. The RCZ was developed under code name "T75".

The 30,000th RCZ was assembled in June 2011. The 50,000th RCZ was built on 14 February 2013 and was painted red. After a production period of almost six years, the last Peugeot RCZ was assembled in the Magna Steyr Graz plant in September 2015.

=== Engines ===
Petrol engines
Model	Engine	Displacement cc (ci)	Power	Torque	0–100 km/h (0-62 mph) (s)	Top speed km/h (mph)	Transmission	CO_{2} emission
1.6-litre THP156 2010–2015	I4 turbo	1,598 cc (97.5 cu in)	156 PS (115 kW; 154 hp) at 6,000 rpm	240 N⋅m (177 lbf⋅ft) at 1,400 rpm	8.4	212 km/h (132 mph)	6-speed automatic	168 g/km
1.6-litre THP204 2010–2015	I4 turbo	1,598 cc (97.5 cu in)	204 PS (150 kW; 201 hp) at 5,800 rpm	275 N⋅m (203 lbf⋅ft) at 1,770 rpm	7.5	235 km/h (146 mph)	6-speed manual	155 g/km
1.6-litre THP270 2014–2015	I4 turbo	1,598 cc (97.5 cu in)	270 PS (199 kW; 266 hp) at 6,000 rpm	330 N⋅m (243 lbf⋅ft) at 1,900 rpm	5.9	250 km/h (155 mph)	6-speed manual	149 g/km
Diesel engines
2.0-litre HDi163 2010–2014	I4 turbo	1,997 cc (121.9 cu in)	163 PS (120 kW; 161 hp) at 4,000 rpm	320 N⋅m (236 lbf⋅ft) at 2,000 rpm	8.2	220 km/h (137 mph)	6-speed manual	139 g/km
2.0-litre HDi FAP 165 2012–2015	I4 turbo	1,997 cc (121.9 cu in)	163 PS (120 kW; 161 hp) at 4,000 rpm	340 N⋅m (251 lbf⋅ft) at 2,000 rpm	8.2	225 km/h (140 mph)	6-speed manual	

=== Equipment ===
The RCZ offered optional electric heated and adjustable seating with driver's memory, leather seats and dashboard and hill assist function. Other options include 19-inch alloy wheels and a JBL sound system. An Elan or Sportif Kit option pack could be selected to change the colour finish of the roof, door mirrors and front grille. While the RCZ has rear seats, they are not large enough for adults to sit comfortably in.

== Derivatives ==
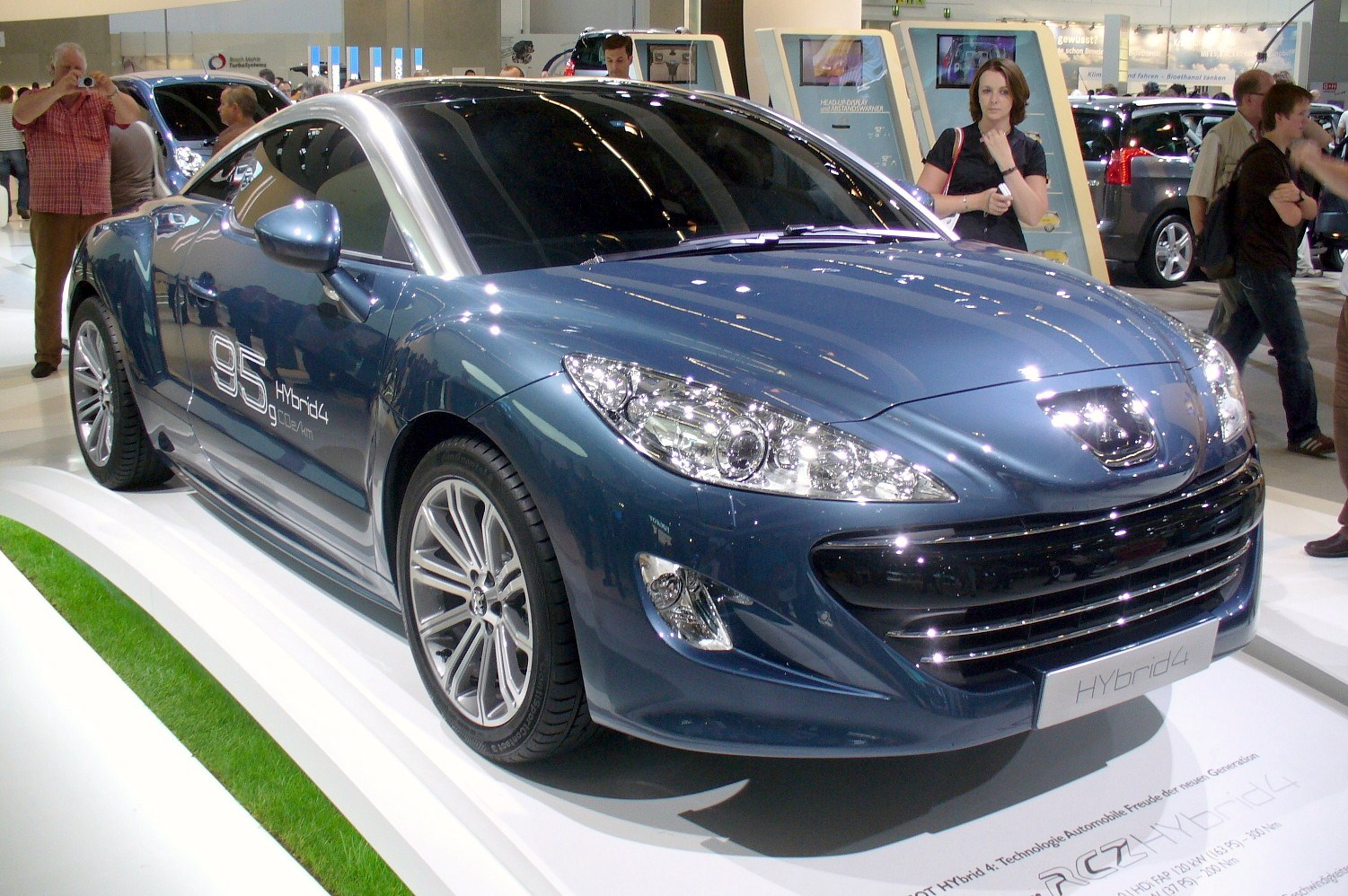
Peugeot RCZ Hybrid4

=== RCZ Hybrid4 Concept ===
The RCZ Hybrid4 concept was announced with a 2.0 L HDi FAP 120 kW (163 PS; 161 hp) engine and a 27 kW (37 PS; 36 hp) electric motor connected to a 6-speed electronically controlled gearbox. The predicted fuel consumption was 3.7 litres per 100 kilometres (76 mpg_{‑imp}; 64 mpg_{‑US}) in mixed cycle, emitting 95 g/km of CO_{2}.

=== RCZ R ===
In November 2012, Peugeot announced their intention of building a more powerful, performance oriented RCZ. In July 2013, the first official pictures of the car were released. The RCZ R has a turbocharged 1.6L engine producing 266 bhp (198 kW; 270 PS) at 6000 rpm and 330 N⋅m (243 lbf⋅ft) of torque from 1900-5500 rpm, giving it a specific output of 166 bhp per litre, and making it the most powerful engine of this displacement in any production car at the time. This gave it a 0-62 mph (100 km/h) time of 5.9 seconds, with the top speed limited to 155 mph (249 km/h). It also features uprated 380mm Alcon brakes and suspension, a significantly reduced curb weight and a Torsen front differential, like that found on the MK2 Ford Focus RS, to reduce the torque steer faced by front-wheel-drive cars. The RCZ R went on sale in January 2014 at £31,995.

A total of 3,054 units of the RCZ R were manufactured, with 305 brought to the UK.

=== Special editions ===
The RCZ Allure is a special edition of the 1.6 THP156 with the 6-speed Tiptronic transmission and 18-inch wheels.

The Asphalt is limited edition (500 units) version of the RCZ. It includes 19-inch black and silver alloy wheels, and black leather sport seats.

The RCZ Brownstone is a limited edition, available exclusively in Germany, with metallic brown paint and silver racing stripes. Inside, the special version is finished in brown, with Cohiba leather and Alcantara trim.

The RCZ Magnetic is available exclusively in the UK, with production limited to 170 units. Models are available in pearlescent black with Flame Red leather sports seats or white with black leather sports seats, with matte black roof arches and a black grille, brake calipers and door mirrors. They also feature a soft touch leather sports steering wheel and a short shift gear lever.

The RCZ Raidillon is available in Belgium and Luxembourg with production limited to 55 examples. The colour Guaranja Brown is unique to this version. Inside, the Cohiba Nappa leather and Alcantara upholstery has additional embroidery "Raidillon" lettering in the backrest.

== Reception and awards ==
The Peugeot RCZ received the Top Gear 2010 Coupe of the Year award, three times in a row the Auto Express Best Coupé of the Year, the Auto Express readers Special Design Award 2010 and the Best of the Best Red Dot Award for its design. From 2010 to 2014, the Peugeot RCZ has been awarded five successive times Best Sports Car by Diesel Car magazine. According to Ian Robertson, editor of DieselCar: 'The Peugeot RCZ offers a rewarding driving experience, agile handling and a well sorted ride, and frugal diesel power. It really is the icing on the cake for the sexily styled sports coupé'. Matt Saunders of Autocar compared the RCZ R favorably to its rivals, describing the Audi TT as 'dull to drive and quite aged now', and the Mini Coupé JCW 1.6 as 'nowhere near as finessed as the Peugeot.'

== Motorsport ==
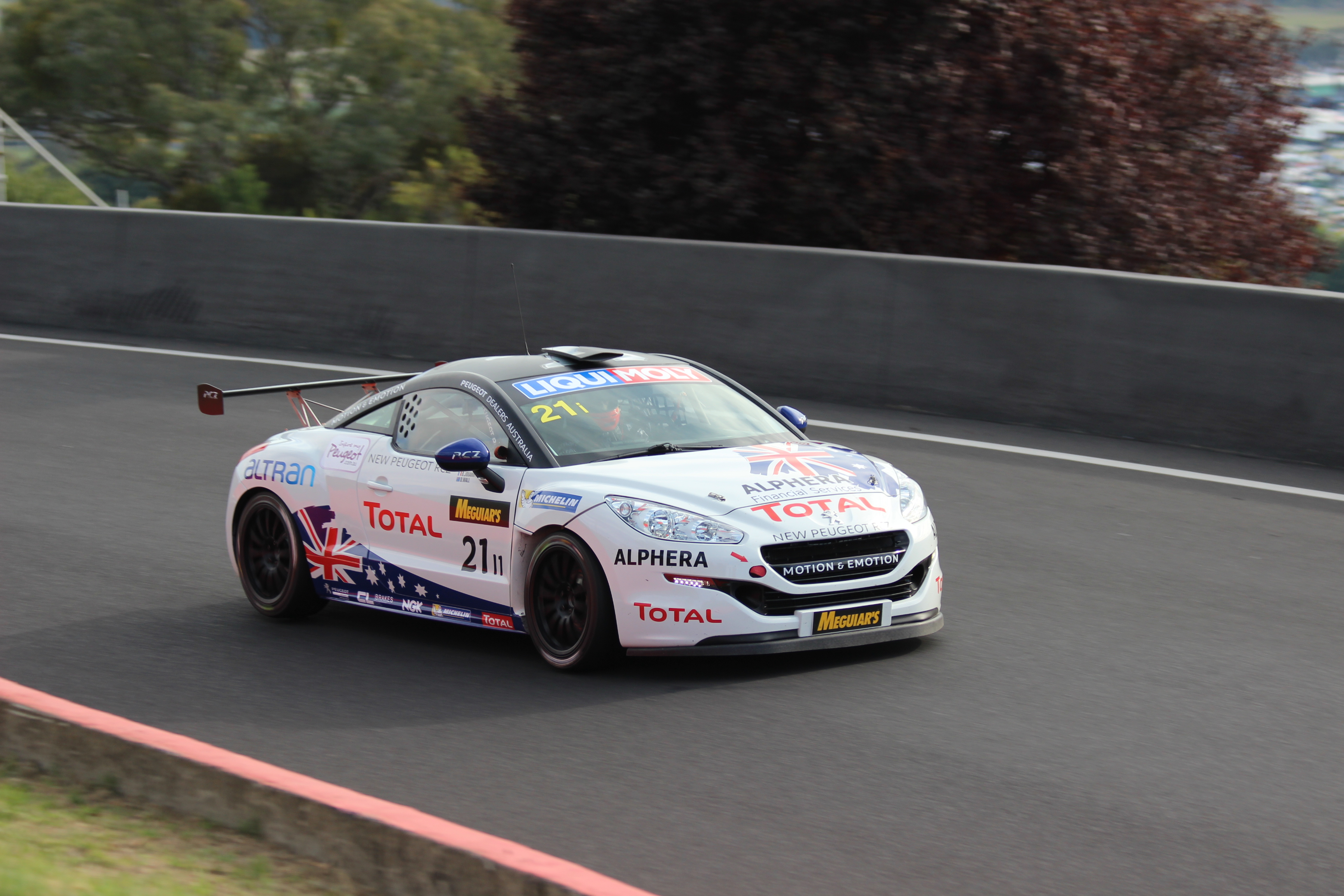
2013 Bathurst 12 Hour Class I1 winner

A modified version of the RCZ is used in the Peugeot RCZ Racing Cup Italy one make race. The car used is known as the RCZ Peugeot Sport, which features an increased power output from 200 to 250 bhp, uprated brakes and an adjustable rear spoiler amongst standard motorsport preparations such as weight reduction and a roll cage. Racing versions of the RCZ have also competed successfully in the 24 Hours of Nürburgring, claiming class victories with diesel based variants in 2010 and 2011 and with the RCZ Peugeot Sport in 2012.

== Sales and production ==
Year	Worldwide Production	Worldwide sales	Notes
2009	100	100	
2010	19,100	16,600	
2011	19,725	18,828	Total unit production reaches 38,933 units.
2012	9,800	11,118	Total unit production reaches 48,800 units.
2013	unknown	9,249	
2014	unknown	6,994	
2015	unknown	4,558	18 September 2015 is the last production date for the RCZ.
2016	0	459	Total sales reaches 67,906 units 31 December 2016.
2017	0	10	10 sales to end of October 2017, total sales: 67,916.
