= Kurt Mollekens =

Belgian racing driver (born 1973)

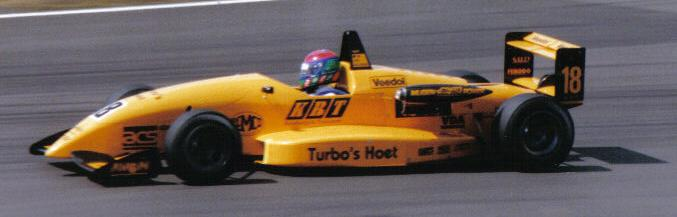
- Mollekens driving for Alan Docking Racing during the 1995 British F3 season
- Nationality: (Belgium) Belgian
- Born: Kurt Emiel Julia Mollekens; 8 March 1973 (age 53) Bonheiden, Belgium
- Categorisation: FIA Gold

Kurt Emiel Julia Mollekens (born 8 March 1973 in Bonheiden) is a Belgian race car driver and team owner.

Mollekens debuted as a driver in top-level karting during 1990, staying there until 1992 when he moved up to Formula Ford. His debut Formula Ford year was successful, him winning all three titles he challenged for – Benelux Formula Ford, Dutch Formula Ford and Belgian Formula Ford.

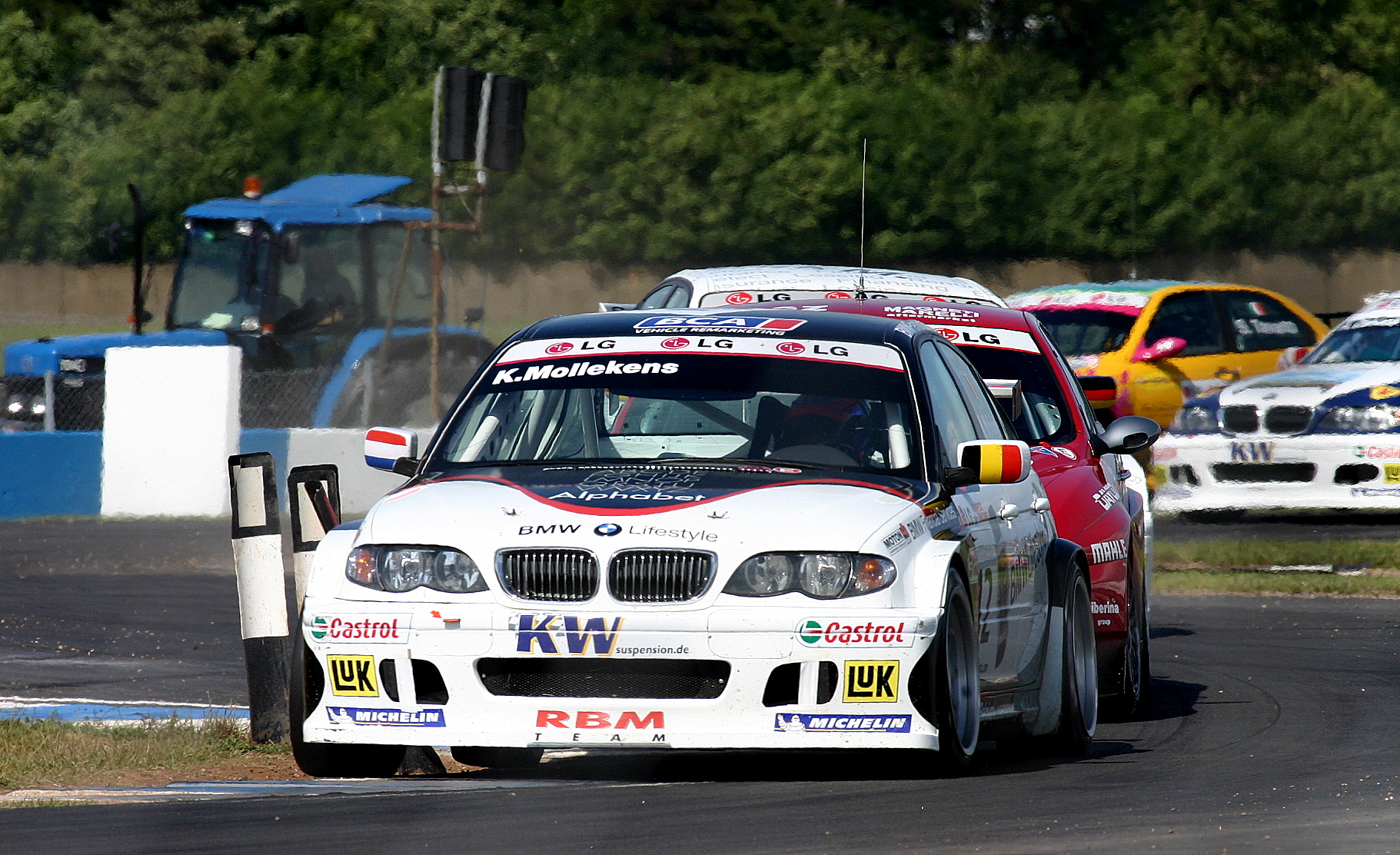
Mollekens during the 2004 European Touring Car Championship.

Mollekens also achieved success in the 1993 British Formula Ford season, which helped him into Formula Opel Euroseries (1994) and the British Formula 3 Championship (1995). He stayed in the latter during 1996, at which time he won the international Formula Three race at Zandvoort, his biggest win. Mollekens joined Formula 3000 in 1997 and spent two years there with the Keerbergs Transport Racing team, which he owned. In 1999, he continued to run the team without driving, instead driving for Peugeot in the Belgian Pro Car Series.

Mollekens continued as an F3000 team owner until 2001, and after a hiatus as a driver in 2000, returned as a competitor in some races of the FIA GT Championship of 2001 and 2002. In 2002, his team left Formula 3000, moving to the lesser-known World Series by Nissan, and latterly, World Series by Renault, in which the team competed until 2008. After a hiatus KTR planned to return to racing in 2009 in the Eurocup Formula Renault 2.0. In 2004, Mollekens continued as a driver in part of the European Touring Car Championship.

== Complete International Formula 3000 results ==
(key) (Races in bold indicate pole position; races in italics indicate fastest lap.)

Year	Entrant	1	2	3	4	5	6	7	8	9	10	11	12	Pos.	Pts
1997	KTR	SIL; EX	PAU; 10	HEL; Ret	NÜR; DNQ	PER; 5	HOC; 6	A1R; Ret	SPA; Ret	MUG; Ret	JER; Ret			19th	3
1998	KTR	OSC; Ret	IMO; 2	CAT; 2	SIL; 8	MON; 5	PAU; 10	A1R; 10	HOC; Ret	HUN	SPA; DNQ	PER; 8	NÜR; 4	7th	19

=== Complete 24 Hours of Spa results ===
Year	Team	Co-Drivers	Car	Class	Laps	Pos.	Class Pos.
1997	(Belgium) Castrol Juma Racing	(France) Alain Cudini (Belgium) Stéphane De Groodt	BMW M3	Spa 3.0	453	6th	1st
1998	Renault Sport Belgium	(Belgium) Pierre-Yves Corthals (France) Franck Lagorce	Renault Mégane	SP	474	3rd	3rd
1999	(Belgium) Team Peugeot Belgique Luxembourg	(Belgium) Thierry Van Dalen (Belgium) Thierry Tassin	Peugeot 306 GTi	SP	491	2nd	2nd
2000	(Belgium) Peugeot Team Belgique Luxembourg	(Belgium) Frédéric Bouvy (Belgium) Didier Defourny	Peugeot 306 GTi	SP	478	1st	1st
2001	(Belgium) PSI Motorsport	(France) Stéphane Cohen (Belgium) Eric Geboers	Porsche 996 Bi-Turbo	GT	127	DNF	DNF
2002	(Belgium) PSI Motorsport	(Belgium) Eric Geboers (Finland) Markus Palttala	Porsche 996 Bi-Turbo	GT	312	DNF	DNF
2003	(Germany) Zakspeed Racing	(Belgium) Didier de Radigues (Portugal) Pedro Lamy	Chrysler Viper GTS-R	G2	468	5th	1st
2004	(Germany) BMW Motorsport	(Spain) Antonio Garcia (Portugal) Pedro Lamy (United Kingdom) Andy Priaulx	BMW M3 GTR	G2	278	DNF	DNF
2005	(France) Larbre Compétition	(France) Christophe Bouchut (Switzerland) Gabriele Gardel (Belgium) Vincent Vosse	Ferrari 550-GTS Maranello	GT1	567	3rd	3rd
2006	(Belgium) GLPK Carsport	(Netherlands) Mike Hezemans (Belgium) Anthony Kumpen (Belgium) Bert Longin	Chevrolet Corvette C6.R	GT1	580	3rd	3rd
2007	(Belgium) PK Carsport	(Belgium) Frédéric Bouvy (Belgium) Anthony Kumpen (Belgium) Bert Longin	Chevrolet Corvette C5-R	GT1	529	3rd	3rd
2008	(Belgium) PK Carsport	(Belgium) Frédéric Bouvy (Belgium) Anthony Kumpen (Belgium) Bert Longin	Saleen S7-R	GT1	255	DNF	DNF
2009	(Belgium) PK Carsport	(Netherlands) Mike Hezemans (Belgium) Anthony Kumpen (Netherlands) Jos Menten	Chevrolet Corvette C6.R	GT1	559	1st	1st
2010	(Belgium) WRT Belgian Audi Club	(Belgium) Stéphane Lémeret (Monaco) Stéphane Ortelli (Belgium) François Verbist	Audi R8 LMS	GT3	497	13th	5th

=== Complete 24 Hours of Zolder results ===
Year	Team	Co-Drivers	Car	Class	Laps	Pos.	Class Pos.
2000	(Belgium) PSI Motorsport	(Belgium) Damien Coens (Belgium) Louis Zurstrassen	Porsche 996 GT3	GTB	709	9th	5th
2004	(Belgium) PSI Motorsport	(Belgium) Frédéric Bouvy (Belgium) Vincent Vosse	Porsche 996 GT3 Cup	GTB	690	14th	8th
2005	(Belgium) PSI Motorsport	(Finland) Markus Palttala (Belgium) Vincent Radermecker (Belgium) Leo Van Sande	Porsche 996 Bi-Turbo	GTA	746	7th	2nd
2006	(Belgium) GLPK Carsport	(Netherlands) Mike Hezemans (Belgium) Anthony Kumpen (Belgium) Bert Longin	Chevrolet Corvette C5-R	Belcar 1	815	3rd	3rd
2007	(Belgium) PK Carsport	(Netherlands) David Hart (Belgium) Anthony Kumpen (Belgium) Bert Longin	Chevrolet Corvette C6 Z06.R GT3	Belcar 1		DNF	DNF
2009	(Belgium) Delahaye Racing Team	(Belgium) Frédéric Bouvy (Belgium) Damien Coens (Belgium) Christian Kelders	Ferrari F430 GT3	Belcar 1		DNF	DNF

Sporting positions
Preceded by Norberto Fontana	Formula Three Masters; Winner; 1996	Succeeded by Tom Coronel
