= 2004 European Touring Car Championship =

Motorsport contest

Seasons
- ← 2003 2005 (ETC Cup); 2005 (WTCC) →

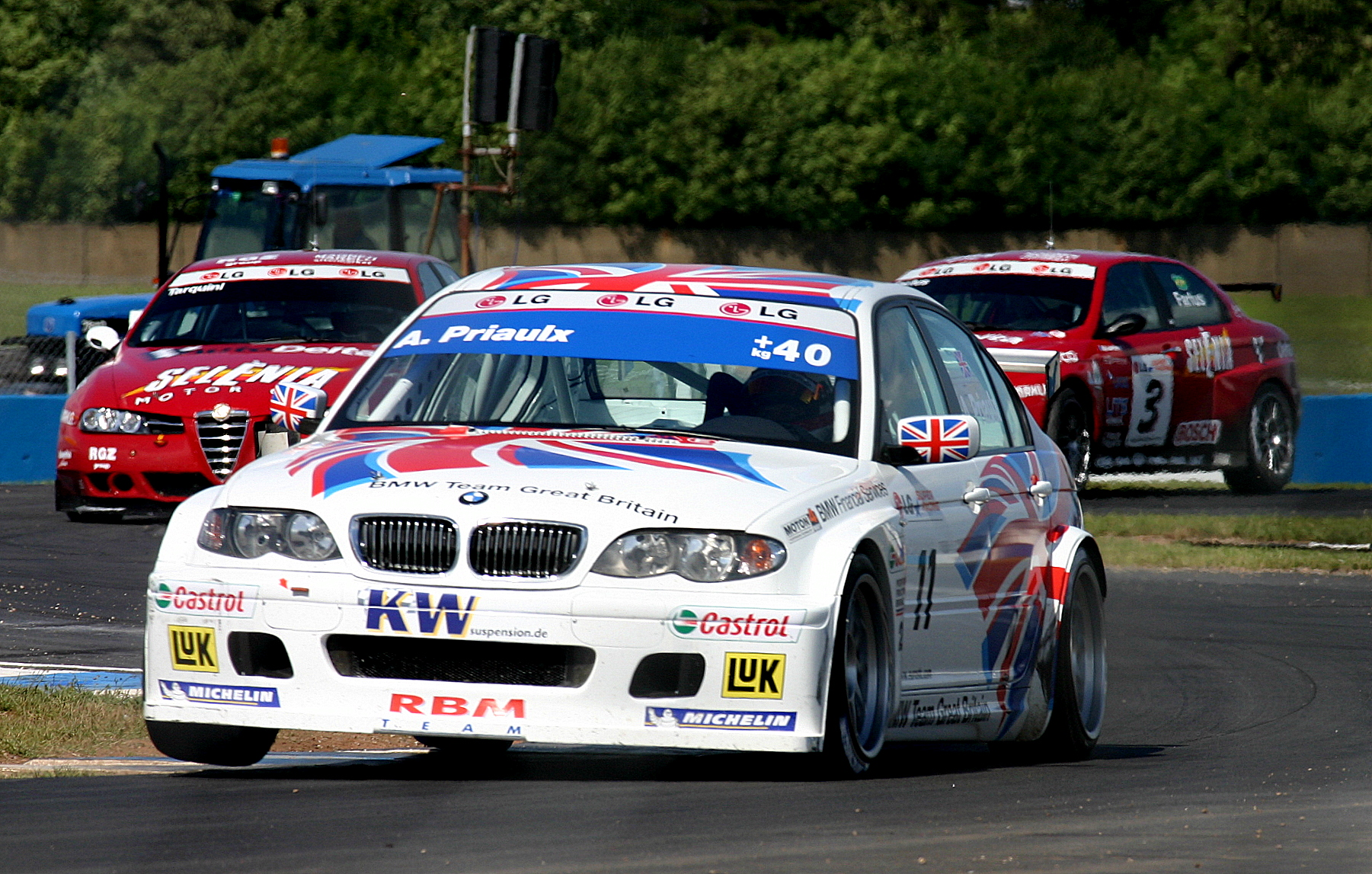
2004 champion Andy Priaulx

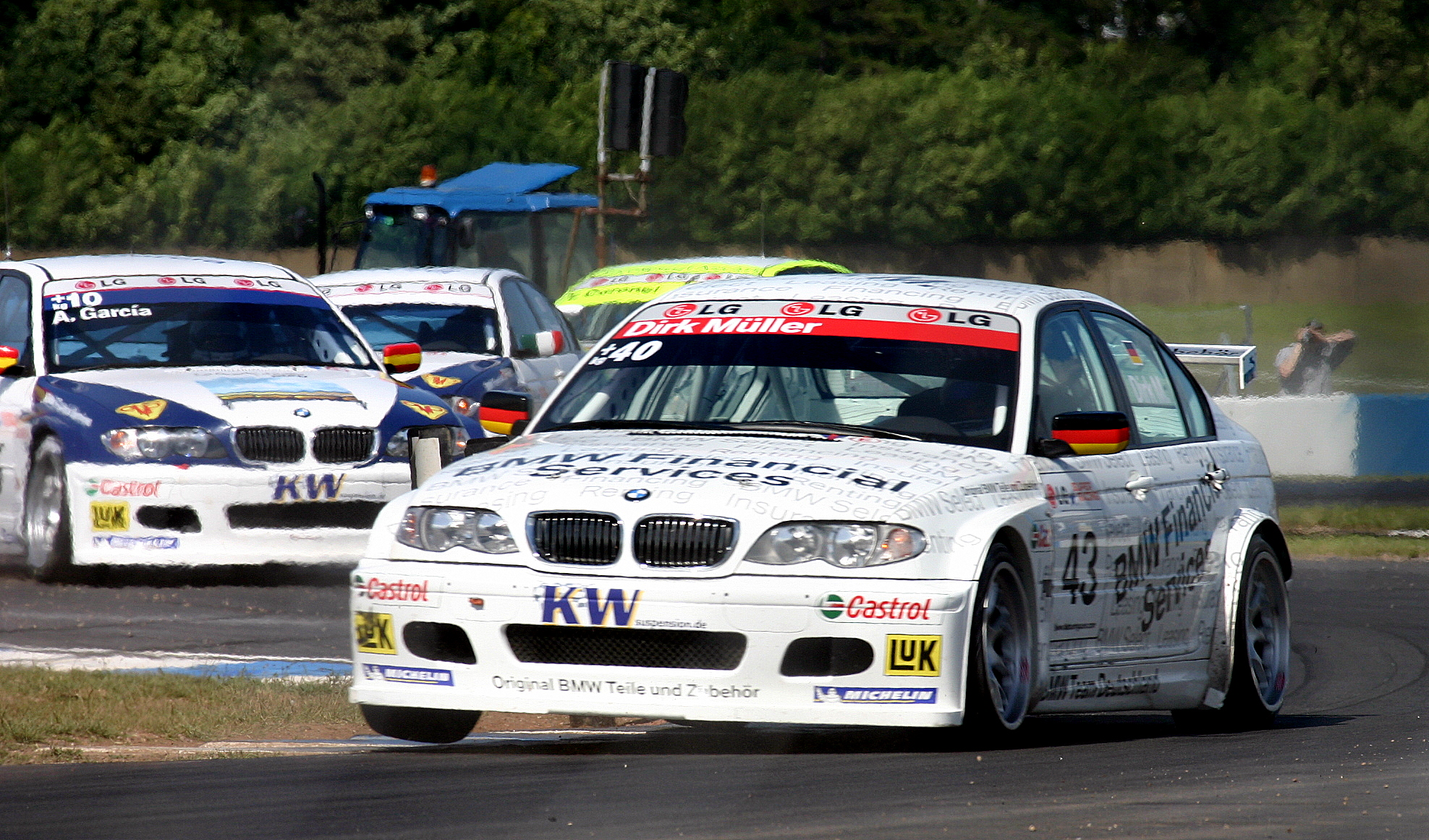
Second in the championship, Dirk Müller

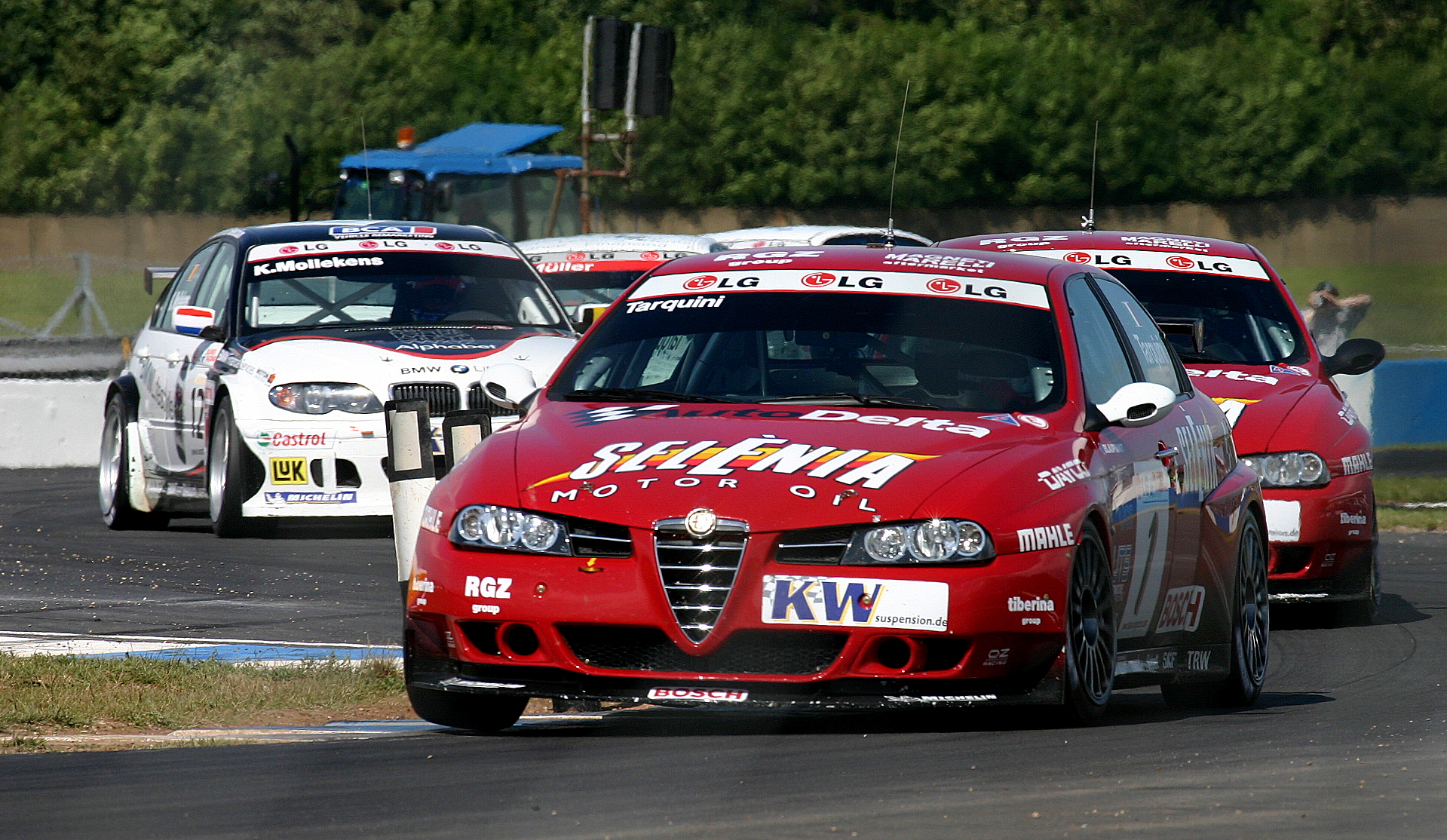
Third in the championship, Gabriele Tarquini

The 2004 FIA European Touring Car Championship season was the last European Touring Car Championship season. For 2005, the European Championship would become the World Touring Car Championship, and a one-off European Touring Car Cup would be held.

The season began at Monza on 28 March, and finished at Dubai after twenty races over ten meetings.

The Drivers' Championship title was won by Andy Priaulx for BMW Team Great Britain, who tied on points with BMW Team Deutschland's Dirk Müller, although Priaulx earned the title due to his greater number of victories during the season. AutoDelta's Gabriele Tarquini was third.

BMW won the Manufacturers Championship ahead of Alfa Romeo and SEAT. Tom Coronel won the Michelin Independents Trophy, while AutoDelta won the Michelin Teams Trophy.

== Teams and drivers ==
Team	Car	No.	Drivers	Class	Rounds
(Italy) AutoDelta Squadra Corse	Alfa Romeo 156	1	(Italy) Gabriele Tarquini		All
(Italy) AutoDelta Squadra Corse	Alfa Romeo 156	2	(Italy) Fabrizio Giovanardi		All
(Italy) AutoDelta Squadra Corse	Alfa Romeo 156	3	(Brazil) Augusto Farfus		All
(Italy) AutoDelta Squadra Corse	Alfa Romeo 156	6	(United Kingdom) James Thompson		6–7, 9–10
BMW Team Italy-Spain	BMW 320i	4	(Italy) Alessandro Zanardi		All
BMW Team Italy-Spain	BMW 320i	5	(Spain) Antonio García		All
(United Kingdom) BMW Team UK; BMW Team Belgium-Luxembourg	BMW 320i	11	(United Kingdom) Andy Priaulx		All
(United Kingdom) BMW Team UK; BMW Team Belgium-Luxembourg	BMW 320i	12	(Belgium) Kurt Mollekens		3–7
(Germany) BMW Team Deutschland	BMW 320i	42	(Germany) Jörg Müller		All
(Germany) BMW Team Deutschland	BMW 320i	43	(Germany) Dirk Müller		All
(Italy) SEAT Sport Italia	SEAT Toledo Cupra	7	(Italy) Gianni Morbidelli		1
(Spain) SEAT Sport	SEAT Toledo Cupra	8	(Sweden) Rickard Rydell		All
(Spain) SEAT Sport	SEAT Toledo Cupra	9	(Spain) Jordi Gené		All
(Spain) SEAT Sport	SEAT Toledo Cupra	10	(Germany) Frank Diefenbacher		All
(Italy) JAS Motorsport	Honda Accord Euro R	14	(Italy) Alessandro Balzan	I	All
(Hong Kong) GR Asia	Honda Civic Type-R	16	(United Kingdom) Simon Harrison	I	All
(Hong Kong) GR Asia	Honda Civic Type-R	17	(Finland) Toni Rasmus Ruokonen	I	1–7, 10
(Germany) RS-Line Rotpunkt Sport	Ford Focus ST170	18	(Germany) Sebastian Grunert	I	1–5, 7–8, 10
(Germany) RS-Line Rotpunkt Sport	Ford Focus ST170	19	(Germany) Roland Asch	I	1, 3–4
(Germany) RS-Line Rotpunkt Sport	Ford Focus ST170	28	(Germany) Thomas Klenke	I	2, 9
(Netherlands) Carly Motors	BMW 320i	20	(Netherlands) Tom Coronel	I	1–9
(Netherlands) Carly Motors	BMW 320i	21	(Netherlands) Paulien Zwart	I	1–2, 7
(Netherlands) Carly Motors	BMW 320i	22	(Netherlands) Klaas Zwart	I	3, 5–6
(Netherlands) Carly Motors	BMW 320i	26	(Netherlands) Duncan Huisman	I	9
(Denmark) Peugeot Sport Engineering	Peugeot 307 Gti	23	(Denmark) Jan Magnussen		2–7, 10
(Denmark) Peugeot Sport Engineering	Peugeot 307 Gti	24	(Denmark) Jason Watt		6
(Denmark) Peugeot Sport Engineering	Peugeot 307 Gti	29	(Italy) Sandro Sardelli	I	7–10
(Italy) Proteam Motorsport	BMW 320i	25	(Italy) Stefano D'Aste	I	1–8
(Sweden) Crawford Racing	BMW 320i	27	(Sweden) Carl Rosenblad	I	All
(Italy) Oregon Team	Alfa Romeo 156 GTA	44	(Italy) Salvatore Tavano	I	All
(Italy) Oregon Team	Alfa Romeo 156 GTA	45	(Austria) Michele Bartyan	I	All
(Italy) Oregon Team	Alfa Romeo 156 GTA	46	(Italy) Luca Rangoni	I	All
(Germany) Schubert Motors	BMW 320i	51	(Germany) Claudia Hürtgen	*	7, 9
(Germany) Schubert Motors	BMW 320i	52	(Germany) Thomas Winkelhock	*	7, 9
(Germany) Ford Ravenol Hotfiel Sport	Ford Focus ST170	55	(Germany) Thomas Klenke	*	?
(Germany) Ford Ravenol Hotfiel Sport	Ford Focus ST170	56	(Germany) Patrick Bernhardt	*	7, 9
(Germany) Ford Ravenol Hotfiel Sport	Ford Focus ST170	57	(Germany) Michael Funke	*	7, 9
(Germany) Engstler Motorsport	BMW 320i	60	(Germany) Franz Engstler	*	7, 9
(Germany) Wiechers-Sport	BMW 320i	65	(Germany) Marc Hennerici	*	7, 9
(Germany) Wiechers-Sport	BMW 320i	66	(Italy) Diego Romanini	*	7, 9
(Germany) Kissling Motorsport	Opel Astra Coupé	73	(Germany) Stefan Kissling	*	7
(Germany) Kissling Motorsport	Opel Astra Coupé	74	(Germany) Rainer Bastuck	*	7

Icon	Class
I	Independents' Championship
*	Guest drivers ineligible for points

== Calendar ==
Round		Country	Track	Date
1	R1	Italy	Autodromo Nazionale Monza	28 March
1	R2	Italy	Autodromo Nazionale Monza	28 March
2	R3	Spain	Circuit Ricardo Tormo, Valencia	18 April
2	R4	Spain	Circuit Ricardo Tormo, Valencia	18 April
3	R5	France	Circuit de Nevers Magny-Cours	2 May
3	R6	France	Circuit de Nevers Magny-Cours	2 May
4	R7	Germany	Hockenheimring	16 May
4	R8	Germany	Hockenheimring	16 May
5	R9	Czech Republic	Masaryk Circuit, Brno	30 May
5	R10	Czech Republic	Masaryk Circuit, Brno	30 May
6	R11	United Kingdom	Donington Park	27 June
6	R12	United Kingdom	Donington Park	27 June
7	R13	Belgium	Circuit de Spa-Francorchamps	31 July
7	R14	Belgium	Circuit de Spa-Francorchamps	31 July
8	R15	Italy	Autodromo Enzo e Dino Ferrari, Imola	5 September
8	R16	Italy	Autodromo Enzo e Dino Ferrari, Imola	5 September
9	R17	Germany	Motorsport Arena Oschersleben	19 September
9	R18	Germany	Motorsport Arena Oschersleben	19 September
10	R19	United Arab Emirates	Dubai Autodrome	8 October
10	R20	United Arab Emirates	Dubai Autodrome	8 October

== Results and standings ==
=== Races ===
Race	Race Name	Pole Position	Fastest lap	Winning driver	Winning team	Winning independent
1	(Italy) Monza	(Italy) Gabriele Tarquini	(Germany) Dirk Müller	(Italy) Gabriele Tarquini	(Italy) AutoDelta Squadra Corse	(Netherlands) Tom Coronel
2	(Italy) Monza		(Brazil) Augusto Farfus	(Germany) Jörg Müller	(Germany) BMW Team Deutschland	(Netherlands) Tom Coronel
3	(Spain) Valencia	(Brazil) Augusto Farfus	(Italy) Gabriele Tarquini	(Italy) Gabriele Tarquini	(Italy) AutoDelta Squadra Corse	(Italy) Salvatore Tavano
4	(Spain) Valencia		(Brazil) Augusto Farfus	(Italy) Fabrizio Giovanardi	(Italy) AutoDelta Squadra Corse	(Italy) Salvatore Tavano
5	(France) Magny-Cours	(Germany) Jörg Müller	(Spain) Jordi Gené	(Germany) Dirk Müller	(Germany) BMW Team Deutschland	(Austria) Michele Bartyan
6	(France) Magny-Cours		(United Kingdom) Andy Priaulx	(United Kingdom) Andy Priaulx	(United Kingdom) BMW Team UK	(Netherlands) Tom Coronel
7	(Germany) Hockenheim	(Spain) Jordi Gené	(United Kingdom) Andy Priaulx	(United Kingdom) Andy Priaulx	(United Kingdom) BMW Team UK	(Italy) Luca Rangoni
8	(Germany) Hockenheim		(United Kingdom) Andy Priaulx	(Germany) Jörg Müller	(Germany) BMW Team Deutschland	(Italy) Luca Rangoni
9	(Czech Republic) Brno	(Sweden) Rickard Rydell	(United Kingdom) Andy Priaulx	(United Kingdom) Andy Priaulx	(United Kingdom) BMW Team UK	(Netherlands) Tom Coronel
10	(Czech Republic) Brno		(Germany) Dirk Müller	(Germany) Dirk Müller	(Germany) BMW Team Deutschland	(Netherlands) Tom Coronel
11	(United Kingdom) Donington Park	(United Kingdom) James Thompson	(United Kingdom) Andy Priaulx	(United Kingdom) James Thompson	(Italy) AutoDelta Squadra Corse	(Italy) Salvatore Tavano
12	(United Kingdom) Donington Park		(Germany) Dirk Müller	(United Kingdom) Andy Priaulx	(United Kingdom) BMW Team UK	(Netherlands) Tom Coronel
13	(Belgium) Spa-Francorchamps	(Germany) Jörg Müller	(Germany) Frank Diefenbacher	(Germany) Dirk Müller	(Germany) BMW Team Deutschland	(Italy) Salvatore Tavano
14	(Belgium) Spa-Francorchamps		(Netherlands) Tom Coronel	(Germany) Jörg Müller	(Germany) BMW Team Deutschland	(Netherlands) Tom Coronel
15	(Italy) Imola	(Italy) Fabrizio Giovanardi	(Italy) Fabrizio Giovanardi	(Italy) Gabriele Tarquini	(Italy) AutoDelta Squadra Corse	(Italy) Salvatore Tavano
16	(Italy) Imola		(Italy) Fabrizio Giovanardi	(Italy) Gabriele Tarquini	(Italy) AutoDelta Squadra Corse	(Italy) Alessandro Balzan
17	(Germany) Oschersleben	(Brazil) Augusto Farfus	(United Kingdom) Andy Priaulx	(United Kingdom) Andy Priaulx	(United Kingdom) BMW Team UK	(Netherlands) Tom Coronel
18	(Germany) Oschersleben		(Germany) Frank Diefenbacher	(Sweden) Rickard Rydell	(Spain) SEAT Sport	(Netherlands) Tom Coronel
19	(United Arab Emirates) Dubai	(United Kingdom) Andy Priaulx	(Brazil) Augusto Farfus	(Italy) Gabriele Tarquini	(Italy) AutoDelta Squadra Corse	(Italy) Luca Rangoni
20	(United Arab Emirates) Dubai		(Italy) Gabriele Tarquini	(Italy) Gabriele Tarquini	(Italy) AutoDelta Squadra Corse	(Italy) Salvatore Tavano

== Championship standings ==
Points system
**1st**	**2nd**	**3rd**	**4th**	**5th**	**6th**	**7th**	**8th**
10	8	6	5	4	3	2	1

=== Drivers' Championship ===
Pos	Driver	MON (Italy)		VAL (Spain)		MAG (France)		HOC (Germany)		BRN (Czech Republic)		DON (United Kingdom)		SPA (Belgium)		IMO (Italy)		OSC (Germany)		DUB (United Arab Emirates)		Pts
1	(United Kingdom) Andy Priaulx	5	2	4	6	8	**1**	1	Ret	1	2	6	1	4	5	5	Ret	1	Ret	**2**	2	111
2	(Germany) Dirk Müller	3	3	5	4	1	6	2	3	4	1	9	4	1	2	8	**3**	3	2	17†	5	111
3	(Italy) Gabriele Tarquini	**1**	Ret	1	2	5	2	Ret	6	9	Ret	3	2	5	4	1	1	Ret	DNS	1	1	106
4	(Germany) Jörg Müller	4	1	6	5	**2**	4	4	1	7	4	2	Ret	**2**	1	7	Ret	4	Ret	6	12	93
5	(Italy) Fabrizio Giovanardi	2	Ret	2	1	6	5	Ret	DNS	5	5	4	16	Ret	DNS	**2**	2	17	8	Ret	16†	63
6	(Brazil) Augusto Farfus	19	16	**3**	3	3	3	Ret	DNS	12	Ret	5	Ret	8	**22**	3	11	**2**	3	4	15	54
7	(Spain) Antonio García	12	6	7	15	4	Ret	6	2	3	6	10	5	6	3	9	Ret	9	Ret	9	DNS	43
8	(Spain) Jordi Gené	9	7	Ret	11	7	Ret	**3**	4	22†	Ret	7	Ret	3	13	4	4	6	6	Ret	DNS	39
9	(United Kingdom) James Thompson											**1**	3	9	8			5	5	3	3	37
10	(Sweden) Rickard Rydell	10	10	Ret	Ret	Ret	DNS	8	**5**	**2**	12	22	9	Ret	11	11	5	7	1	15	DNS	29
11	(Germany) Frank Diefenbacher	7	**5**	Ret	DNS	Ret	Ret	5	Ret	8	**3**	21	Ret	7	DNS	17	8	25	Ret	5	4	29
12	(Netherlands) Tom Coronel	6	4	10	9	Ret	8	11	8	6	7	13	8	14	6	12	12	8	**4**			25
13	(Belgium) Kurt Mollekens					11	7	Ret	10	11	8	8	**6**	18	7							9
14	(Italy) Salvatore Tavano	Ret	DNS	8	**7**	15	17	9	11	14	16	11	10	10	12	6	Ret	11	20	Ret	7	8
15	(Italy) Alessandro Zanardi	8	9	9	10	20	16	12	9	21†	17	12	7	Ret	16	13	Ret	Ret	14	7	6	8
16	(Italy) Luca Rangoni	NC	17	19†	8	18	Ret	7	7	10	Ret	14	Ret	13	14	Ret	9	24†	9	8	**10**	6
17	(Italy) Alessandro Balzan	14	12	12	13	14	10	13	Ret	13	10	15	11	11	10	10	6	Ret	DNS	Ret	DNS	3
18	(Austria) Michele Bartyan	20†	11	Ret	DNS	9	12	14	16	20	13	18	12	20	17	14	7	18	18	16†	8	3
19	(Sweden) Carl Rosenblad	Ret	DNS	17	19	12	11	17	13	18	9	17	14	12	9	20	10	12	7	18	9	2
20	(Italy) Stefano D'Aste	13	8	14	12	10	9	16†	DNS	16	14	16	Ret	Ret	DNS	15	Ret					1
-	(Netherlands) Duncan Huisman																	10	10			0
-	(United Kingdom) Simon Harrison	15	Ret	15	16	Ret	DNS	Ret	14	19	11	24†	15	Ret	DNS	19	15†	21	16†	10	11	0
-	(Denmark) Jan Magnussen			11	Ret	19†	18†	10	12	15	Ret	19	Ret	17	18					12	DNS	0
-	(Italy) Sandro Sardelli													23	Ret	18	14†	Ret	15	11	DNS	0
-	(Italy) Gianni Morbidelli	11	Ret																			0
-	(Germany) Sebastian Grunert	18	18†	Ret	DNS	NC	14	Ret	DNS	17	Ret			22	Ret	16	13			14	13	0
-	(Finland) Toni Rasmus Ruokonen	17	13	16	18	16	15	15	15	Ret	DNS	23	17	24	27†					13	14	0
-	(Germany) Roland Asch	21	14			13	13	Ret	DNS													0
-	(Germany) Thomas Klenke			13	14													20	Ret			0
-	(Denmark) Jason Watt											20	13									0
-	(Netherlands) Paulien Zwart	16	15	18	17									Ret	DNS							0
-	(Netherlands) Klaas Zwart					17	Ret			23	15	Ret	Ret									0
guest drivers ineligible for points
	(Germany) Claudia Hürtgen													16	19			15	11			
	(Germany) Marc Hennerici													29	21			19	12			
	(Germany) Michael Funke													19	20			14	13			
	(Germany) Franz Engstler													21	Ret			13	19			
	(Germany) Thomas Winkelhock													15	15			16	17			
	(Italy) Diego Romanini													27	24			22	Ret			
	(Germany) Patrick Bernhardt													26	25			23†	DNS			
	(Germany) Stefan Kissling													25	23							
	(Germany) Rainer Bastuck													28	26							
Pos	Driver	MON (Italy)		VAL (Spain)		MAG (France)		HOC (Germany)		BRN (Czech Republic)		DON (United Kingdom)		SPA (Belgium)		IMO (Italy)		OSC (Germany)		DUB (United Arab Emirates)		Pts

Colour	Result
Gold	Winner
Silver	Second place
Bronze	Third place
Green	Points classification
Blue	Non-points classification
Blue	Non-classified finish (NC)
Purple	Retired, not classified (Ret)
Red	Did not qualify (DNQ)
Red	Did not pre-qualify (DNPQ)
Black	Disqualified (DSQ)
White	Did not start (DNS)
White	Withdrew (WD)
White	Race cancelled (C)
Blank	Did not practice (DNP)
Blank	Did not arrive (DNA)
Blank	Excluded (EX)

**Bold** - Pole
Italics - Fastest Lap
† Retired but classified

=== Independents' Trophy ===
Pos	Driver	MON (Italy)		VAL (Spain)		MAG (France)		HOC (Germany)		BRN (Czech Republic)		DON (United Kingdom)		SPA (Belgium)		IMO (Italy)		OSC (Germany)		DUB (United Arab Emirates)		Pts
1	(Netherlands) Tom Coronel	6	4	10	9	Ret	8	11	8	6	7	13	8	14	6	12	12	8	4			140
2	(Italy) Salvatore Tavano	Ret	DNS	8	7	15	17	9	11	14	16	11	10	10	12	6	Ret	11	20	Ret	7	106
3	(Italy) Alessandro Balzan	14	12	12	13	14	10	13	Ret	13	10	15	11	11	10	10	6	Ret	DNS	Ret	DNS	91
4	(Italy) Luca Rangoni	NC	17	19†	8	18	Ret	7	7	10	Ret	14	Ret	13	14	Ret	9	24†	9	8	10	82
5	(Austria) Michele Bartyan	20†	11	Ret	DNS	9	12	14	16	20	13	18	12	20	17	14	7	18	18	16†	8	76
6	(Sweden) Carl Rosenblad	Ret	DNS	17	19	12	11	17	13	18	9	17	14	12	9	20	10	12	7	18	9	76
7	(Italy) Stefano D'Aste	13	8	14	12	10	9	16†	DNS	16	14	16	Ret	Ret	DNS	15	Ret					58
8	(United Kingdom) Simon Harrison	15	Ret	15	16	Ret	DNS	Ret	14	19	11	24†	15	Ret	DNS	19	15†	21	16†	10	11	45
9	(Finland) Toni Rasmus Ruokonen	17	13	16	18	16	15	15	15	Ret	DNS	23	17	24	27†					13	14	29
10	(Germany) Sebastian Grunert	18	18†	Ret	DNS	NC	14	Ret	DNS	17	Ret			22	Ret	16	13			14	13	22
11	(Italy) Sandro Sardelli													23	Ret	18	14†	Ret	15	11	DNS	16
12	(Germany) Roland Asch	21	14			13	13	Ret	DNS													11
13	(Germany) Thomas Klenke			13	14													20	Ret			8
14	(Netherlands) Paulien Zwart	16	15	18	17									Ret	DNS							7
15	(Netherlands) Klaas Zwart					17	Ret			23	15	Ret	Ret									3
Pos	Driver	MON (Italy)		VAL (Spain)		MAG (France)		HOC (Germany)		BRN (Czech Republic)		DON (United Kingdom)		SPA (Belgium)		IMO (Italy)		OSC (Germany)		DUB (United Arab Emirates)		Pts

Colour	Result
Gold	Winner
Silver	Second place
Bronze	Third place
Green	Points classification
Blue	Non-points classification
Blue	Non-classified finish (NC)
Purple	Retired, not classified (Ret)
Red	Did not qualify (DNQ)
Red	Did not pre-qualify (DNPQ)
Black	Disqualified (DSQ)
White	Did not start (DNS)
White	Withdrew (WD)
White	Race cancelled (C)
Blank	Did not practice (DNP)
Blank	Did not arrive (DNA)
Blank	Excluded (EX)

**Bold** - Pole
Italics - Fastest Lap

Point system: 10-8-6-5-4-3-2-1 for top eight finishers.
