= Tom Coronel =

Dutch racing driver (born 1972)

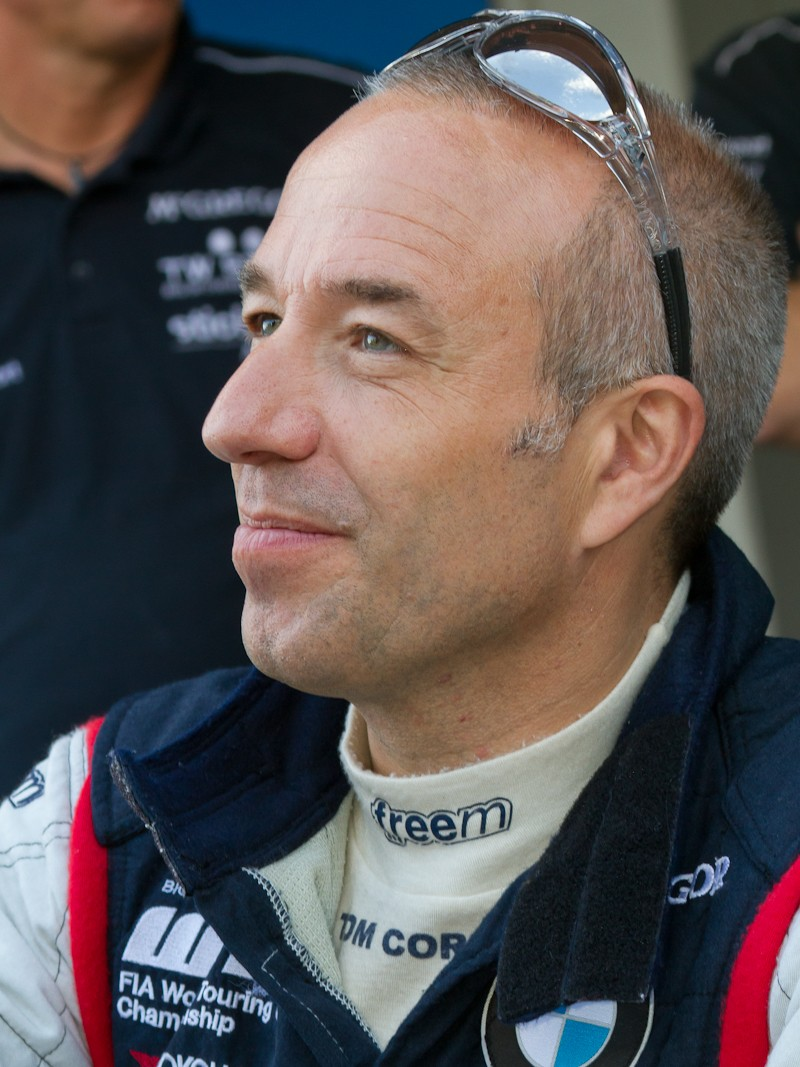
- Coronel at the 2011 FIA WTCC Race of Japan
- Nationality: (Netherlands) Dutch
- Born: Tom Romeo Coronel; 5 April 1972 (age 54) Naarden, Netherlands
- Relatives: Tim Coronel (brother); Rocco Coronel (son)

World Touring Car Championship and World Touring Car Cup career
- Debut season: 2005
- Current team: Comtoyou Racing
- Categorisation: FIA Platinum (until 2021); FIA Gold (2022–)
- Car number: 32
- Former teams: SR-Sport; GR-Asia, ROAL Motorsport, Boutsen Ginion Racing
- Starts: 282
- Wins: 6
- Poles: 0
- Fastest laps: 3
- Best finish: 4th in 2011

Previous series
- 1990–91 1992, 2001 1992–93 1993 1993 1993 1994 1995 1996–97 1998–99 1998–99, 2003 2000–01, 2004 2001 2001 2002, 2004–05 2002–04 2005 2005 2005 2005 2005 2005 2005/06, 06/07 2007 2007/08 2008, 2009 2008 2009: Dutch Citroën AX Cup; Dutch Touring Car Championship; Dutch Formula Ford Championship; German Formula Ford; Italian Touring Car Championship; Vauxhall Lotus Winter Series; Euroseries Formula Opel; German F3; Japanese Formula 3 Formula Nippon; Japanese GT Championship FIA GT Championship European Le Mans Series; European Superproduction; Dutch Winter Endurance Series ETCC; Spanish GT Championship; Italian Super Touring; EuroBOSS; American Le Mans Series; McGregor Porsche GT3 Cup; European Touring Car Cup; Dutch Winter Endurance Series BTCC; Dutch Winter Endurance Series; Le Mans Series; Benelux Formula Ford; Dakar Rally

Championship titles
- 1991 1992 1993 1994 1997 1997 1999 2004 2006 2009 2023: Dutch Citroën AX Cup; Dutch Touring Car Championship; Dutch Formula Ford; EFDA Nations Cup; Japanese Formula 3 Marlboro Masters; Formula Nippon; ETCC Independents Trophy; WTCC Independents Trophy; WTCC Independents Trophy; TCR Europe Touring Car Series

Awards
- 1994: Dutch Driver of the Year
Medal record
Touring Car Racing
Representing Netherlands
FIA Motorsport Games
Gold medal – first place	2022 Marseille	Touring Car Cup

24 Hours of Le Mans career
- Years: 1999–2006, 2009 –
- Teams: Racing for Holland, Johansson Motorsport, Spyker Squadron
- Best finish: 8th (2002)
- Class wins: 0

Tom Romeo Coronel (born 5 April 1972) is a Dutch professional racing driver. Tom's twin brother Tim is also a racer, just like their father Tom Coronel Sr. His most important results are winning the Marlboro Masters of Formula 3 race in 1997, the Formula Nippon championship in 1999, and the 2006 and 2009 World Touring Car Championship Independents' Trophy. As of September 2016, Tom Coronel has driven over 1,000 races.

Coronel is currently still racing in the WTCC, where he won his first WTCC race in Okayama, Japan in 2008. After competing as an independent driver in a SEAT for many years Tom switched to BMW in 2011. In 2014, Coronel stayed with ROAL Motorsport, but the team switched to Chevrolet Cruzes to be built by RML specially for the new TC1 technical regulations. Even though he has no official factory backing, Coronel is no longer considered an independent driver, due to his experience and results in the past. Coronel has also been racing for the Dutch Spyker Squadron in the Le Mans Series as well as the 24 Hours of Le Mans for many years. Furthermore, Coronel is often invited to join one-off races like the 24 hours at the Nürburgring.

== Biography ==
=== Early years ===
Born in Naarden, Coronel started his racing career in 1990 racing in the Dutch Citroën AX Cup, after being named the most talented driver in the local racing school. After a learning debut year, he started to become successful in 1991. With four victories and 105 points, he won the title; he also won an international Citroën AX race in Barcelona. He moved up to the Dutch Touring Car Championship in 1992 competing in a BMW 320i. He was crowned champion that same year, beating his older brother and teammate Raymond Coronel. He also started to compete in the Dutch Formula Ford championship, with team Fresh. At the end of 1992 he decided to focus his attention on single seater racing.

Coronel stayed with team Fresh in 1993 and again was a strong competitor. Victorious in three races, he won the Dutch Formula Ford championship that year. He also came in second in the Benelux championship, behind the Belgian driver Geoffroy Horion (who lost the Dutch championship to Coronel). His participation in a few German Formula Ford races resulted in a handful of podium finishes. He finished ninth in that year's Formula Ford Festival.

=== European formula ===
In 1994, Coronel debuted in the Euroseries Formula Opel Lotus, racing for the Dutch Van Amersfoort Racing team. With eight pole positions and two victories he was successful, but lost the championship to Marco Campos. He won the nations cup for the Netherlands together with Donny Crevels and was elected 'Dutch Driver of the year'. This gave him the funds he needed to compete in the next year's German Formula Three championship.

Racing for the WTS team (which delivered previous champions as Michael Schumacher and Jos Verstappen), Coronel was teamed up with Ralf Schumacher. The team used a Dallara chassis which was powered by Opel engines. Scoring 74 points in 16 races, he finished seventh in the championship results. He did not perform well in the international Formula Three classics, failing to finish in Macau and Monaco and finishing fifth in the Marlboro Masters at Zandvoort.

=== Moving to the Far East ===
Coronel decided to search for success far from home, signing up to compete in the Japanese Formula 3 championship with team TOM'S for 1996. He scored his first victory at the Sugo circuit, and this along with five second places earned him the third spot in that year's championship. He came in second with the Italian Prema Power team at the annual Monaco Formula Three race.

Coronel stayed with TOM'S for the next season, the team traded in their own chassis for a more competitive Dallara and used Toyota engines. Coronel dominated the championship, winning six out of the seven races he competed in. His lead was so comfortable that he could afford to miss two races to compete in the Macau Grand Prix and Marlboro Masters. Earlier in the year, he was taken out in the leading position at the Monaco Formula Three race, but he was successful for his home crowd in Zandvoort. Starting from the fourth position, he drove his way to the lead and followed through until the finish, becoming the second Dutchman to win the event after Jos Verstappen.

=== Formula Nippon ===
It was time for Coronel to move to the next level. He stayed in Japan in 1998 competing in the Formula Nippon and Japanese GT championship, both for team Nakajima owned by former Formula One driver Satoru Nakajima.

Driving with a Reynard-Toyota combination, his first Formula Nippon season was expected to be a learning year. Coronel had a relatively poor season, due to some bad luck and the team having never previously worked with a non-Japanese driver. He performed much better in the GT championship. Sharing a Honda NSX with Japanese driver Koji Yamanishi, the title was in sight until the last race. Eventually they finished second when the car broke down in the formation lap of the last race.

No changes in Coronel's programme were seen for 1999. In Formula Nippon, he proved to be a strong contender for the championship title. At first, his main rival reigning champion Satoshi Motoyama build up an advantage over Coronel. But during the year Coronel fought his way back to the front of the championship. Winning his first race at Fuji Speedway, he led Motoyama with four points into the last race at Suzuka. Driving side by side, a slow starting Coronel and Motoyama crashed into each other in the first corner of the race. Since there were no other competitors for the title, Coronel was instantly (but controversially) champion. He was not as successful in the Japanese GT that year, having no chances on the title. Coronel made his debut at the 24 Hours of Le Mans with Jan Lammers' Racing for Holland. Teaming up with Lammers and Peter Kox, the team kept up with the factory teams, but had to stop after 213 laps due to technical failure.

=== Formula 1 test ===
After his Japanese successes, Coronel had gained some attention and he decided to focus his energy on finding a Formula One seat. In order to finance his Formula One ambitions, an investment plan was initiated. People could invest in Coronel by buying stocks in 'the Racing Dutchman B.V.'. When Coronel would become successful in Formula One, investors would be repaid. Eventually, the plan failed because some of the investors failed to meet the agreements. Coronel tested once for the Arrows team, but lost the chance for a seat in favour of Jos Verstappen and Pedro de la Rosa. Since Coronel had focused his full attention to Formula One, he found himself without a drive for the beginning of the 2000 racing season. He drove the 24 hours of Le Mans for the second time with Racing for Holland and competed in some FIA GT races with Mike Hezemans.

=== Return to racing ===
With little racing distance covered the previous year, Coronel wanted to race a full season in 2001. He signed up for the works BMW team to compete in the Dutch Touring Car Championship. Just for the start of the season, he was contacted by Lister to compete in the FIA GT Championship. Coronel agreed but had to miss some races since he already signed for BMW. He won races in both championships that year. He would also compete with Stefan Johansson's team at Le Mans that year, but Johansson retired in the first part of the race.

Coronel moved to the European Touring Car Championship (ETCC) in 2002, he participated for Carly Motors alongside Peter Kox and Gianni Morbidelli. They could not keep up with the works teams, but Coronel still harvested three podium finishes. He stayed with Carly in 2003 but had a 2002 spec chassis for most of the season and struggling to keep up. He and Duncan Huisman won the independents trophy for Carly Motors. He also made a one-year return to the Japanese GT, winning one race in a now outdated Honda NSX. The 2004 ETCC season was very similar for him, although his teammate was now Paulien Zwart, his partner. They won the independents team trophy for the second consecutive year and Coronel won the independent drivers title. He finished his first Le Mans race with Racing for Holland in 2002, finishing eighth in the overall standings. He also made the finish in 2003, this time with a Spyker C8. Returning to Racing for Holland in 2004, he formed a high-profile line up with Justin Wilson and Ralph Firman. However, they failed to finish the race. There were some rumours that he had signed a third driver deal with Minardi, but there was never a contract.

=== World Touring Car Championship ===
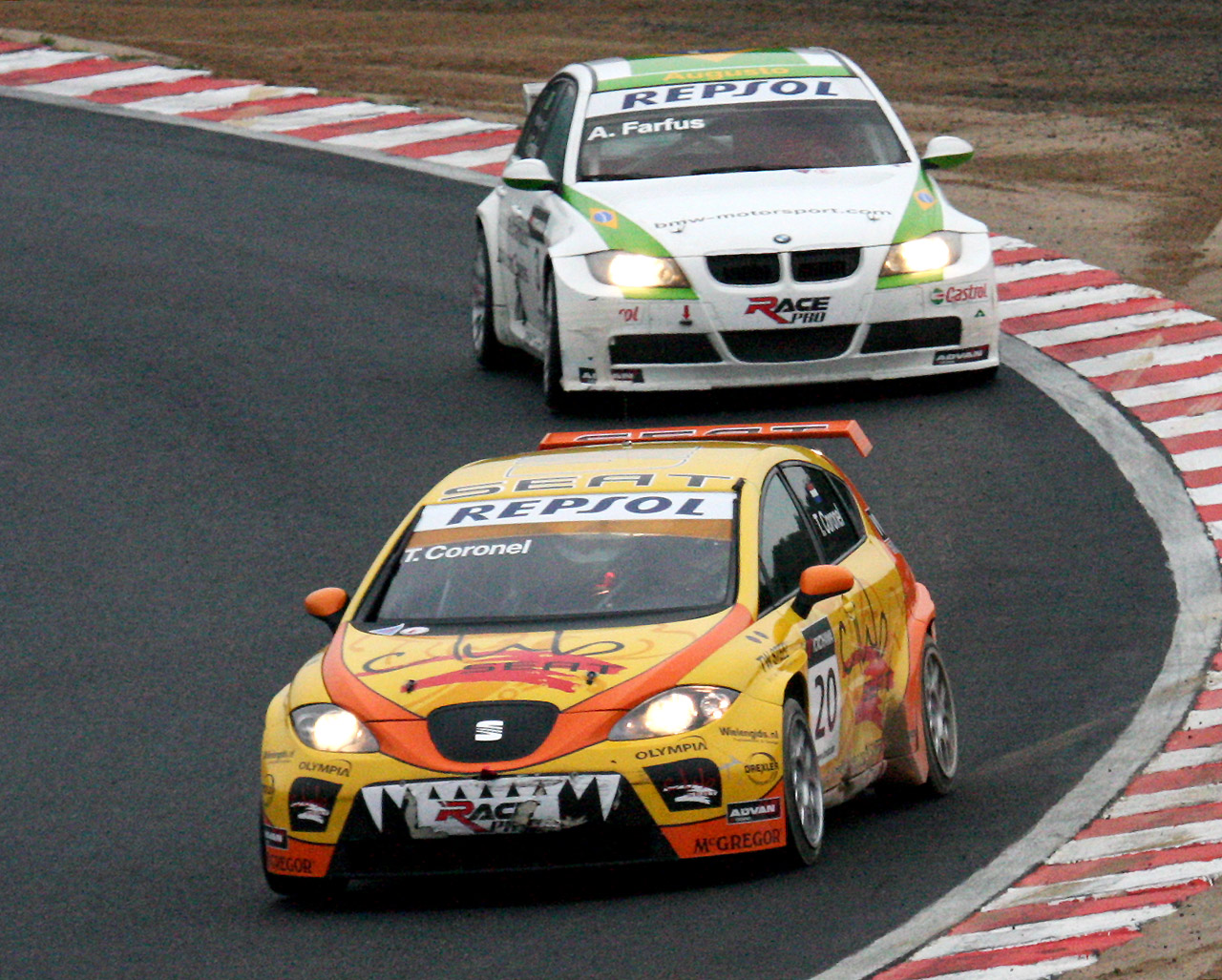
Coronel driving the SEAT León TFSI in the second race at the 2008 WTCC Race of Japan in Okayama. He managed to hold off a charging Augusto Farfus and won his first WTCC race.

The European Touring Car Championship changed its format to a World Championship in 2005 and Coronel moved teams. He left Carly to join up with Team GR Asia, which used the SEAT Toledo. Coronel had a strong year in which he just missed the Independents trophy in the last race. His luck changed for the better in 2006. With the all new SEAT León he did clinch the title, his second in three seasons. He continued his participation with team GR Asia in 2007, though less successful. For the final round of the 2007 British Touring Car Championship at Thruxton, he raced for SEAT Sport UK to help them win the team's championship and the drivers championship for Jason Plato. In both 2005 and 2006, he drove at the 24 Hours of Le Mans for Spyker, but failed to finish in both attempts.

In 2008, Coronel competed in the brand-new SUNRED SEAT Team in another León. He got his podium in Oschersleben and remains one of the most popular WTCC drivers. Autosport magazine voted him as one of the 10 best WTCC drivers. In the second race at the Race of Japan, on the Okayama International Circuit, an absolutely stunning drive brought him his first victory in the WTCC.

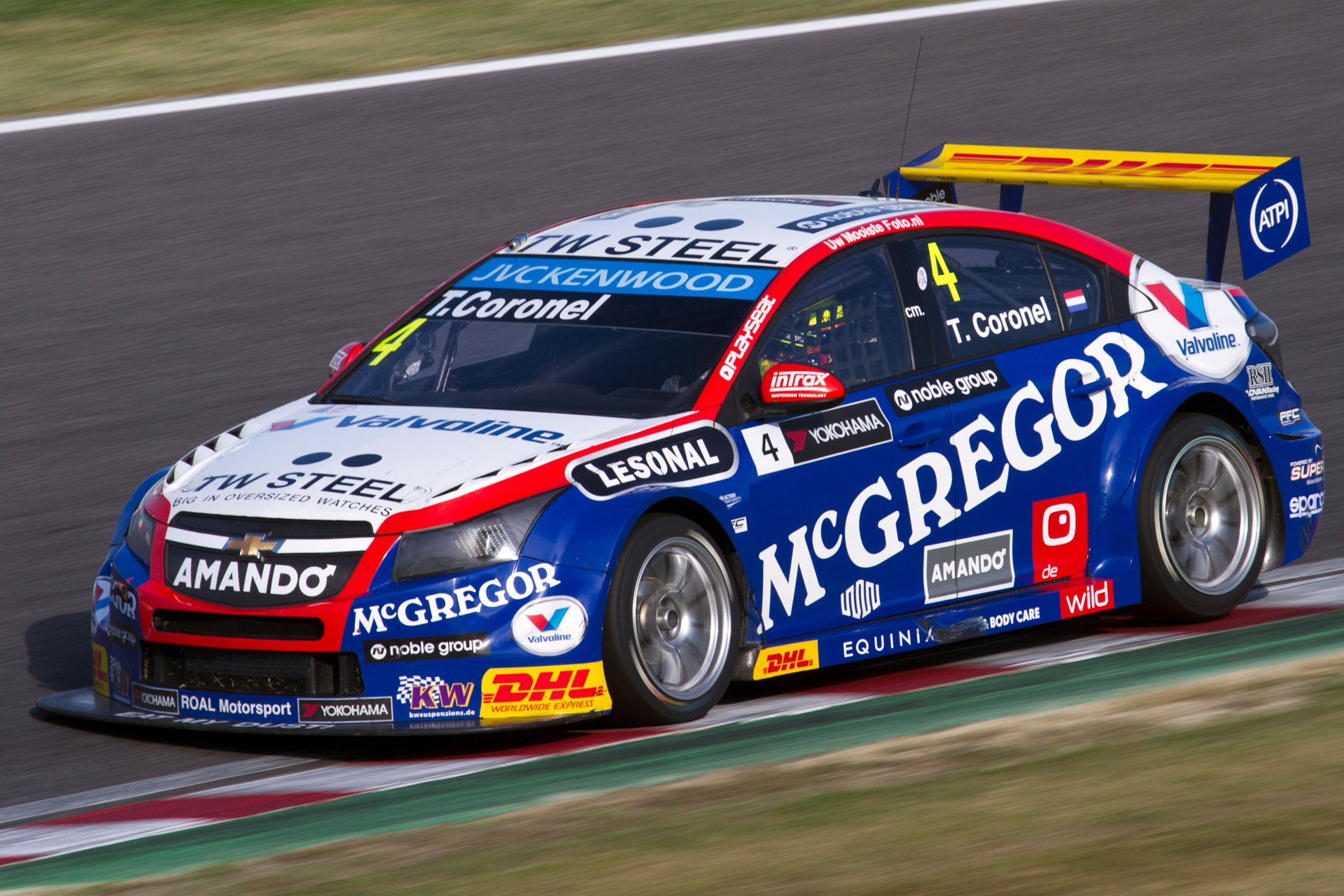
Coronel competing in the 2014 World Touring Car Championship

In 2009, Coronel was eligible for the Independents' Trophy, which he won for Sunred. In 2010, he was driving a turbo diesel León for the new semi-works SR-Sport team, which was run by Sunred. He finished the season eighth, his highest ever. In 2011, Coronel changed teams to join ROAL Motorsport, formerly running the works-team BMW Italy-Spain. Tom won the second race at Suzuka, Japan, his second WTCC overall victory. Coronel stayed with ROAL Motorsport for 2012, this time as part of a two car effort with Alberto Cerqui joining him in the team.

=== Dakar Rally (2009–present) ===
Coronel and his twin brother Tim competed in the 2009 edition of the Dakar Rally in Argentina and Chile (Buenos Aires–Valparaíso–Buenos Aires). This was Tom's first edition of Dakar, whereas brother Tim already competed in 2007 and was lined up for the 2008 edition which got cancelled at the last moment. The brothers were driving a Bowler Nemesis for the dakarsport.com outfit and backed to Buenos Aires in 70th position overall after crossing two countries in 15 stages for a total of 6,000 km from January 3–18.

== Other activities ==
The Coronel family owns two indoor go-karting tracks in Huizen and Enschede. Tom co-hosts an automotive programme with Tim and was a regular guest on the Dutch Formula One broadcast until RTL decided not to go on with the studio shows, in favour of more "on track" time during the broadcast. Tom also worked for Ziggo Sport and Viaplay during their Formula One broadcasts.

Coronel is in a relationship with racing driver Paulien Zwart and they have a daughter and a son (Rocco) together. The pair were teammates at Carly Motors in the 2004 European Touring Car Championship season. Pauline is the daughter of Ascari Cars owner Klaas Zwart, who also raced for Carly in 2004. Rocco Coronel is also a racing driver currently racing in karting and the Ginetta Junior Championship and member of the Red Bull Junior Team.

== Racing record ==
=== 24 Hours of Le Mans results ===
Year	Team	Co-Drivers	Car	Class	Laps	Pos.	Class Pos.
1999	(Germany) Konrad Motorsport (Netherlands) Talkline Racing for Holland	(Netherlands) Jan Lammers (Netherlands) Peter Kox	Lola B98/10-Ford	LMP	213	DNF	DNF
2000	(Germany) Konrad Motorsport (Netherlands) Racing for Holland	(Netherlands) Jan Lammers (Netherlands) Peter Kox	Lola B2K/10-Ford	LMP900	38	DNF	DNF
2001	(United Kingdom) Johansson Motorsport	(Sweden) Stefan Johansson (France) Patrick Lemarié	Audi R8	LMP900	35	DNF	DNF
2002	(Netherlands) Racing for Holland	(Netherlands) Jan Lammers (Netherlands) Val Hillebrand	Dome S101-Judd	LMP900	351	8th	7th
2003	(Netherlands) ST Team Orange Spyker	(Germany) Norman Simon (Netherlands) Hans Hugenholtz	Spyker C8 Double-12R	GT	229	NC	NC
2004	(Netherlands) Racing for Holland	(United Kingdom) Justin Wilson (Republic of Ireland) Ralph Firman	Dome S101-Judd	LMP1	313	NC	NC
2005	(Netherlands) Spyker Squadron	(Netherlands) Peter van Merksteijn Sr. (Netherlands) Donny Crevels	Spyker C8 Spyder GT2-R	GT2	76	DNF	DNF
2006	(Netherlands) Spyker Squadron	(Netherlands) Donny Crevels (United Kingdom) Peter Dumbreck	Spyker C8 Spyder GT2-R	GT2	40	DNF	DNF
2009	(Netherlands) Snoras Spyker Squadron	(Netherlands) Jeroen Bleekemolen (Czech Republic) Jaroslav Janiš	Spyker C8 Laviolette GT2-R	GT2	319	25th	5th
2010	(Netherlands) Spyker Squadron	(United Kingdom) Peter Dumbreck (Netherlands) Jeroen Bleekemolen	Spyker C8 Laviolette GT2-R	GT2	280	27th	9th

=== Complete German Formula Three results ===
(key) (Races in bold indicate pole position) (Races in italics indicate fastest lap)

Year	Entrant	Engine	Class	1	2	3	4	5	6	7	8	9	10	11	12	13	14	15	16	DC	Pts
1995	Opel Team WTS	Opel	A	HOC; 1 Ret	HOC; 2 Ret	AVU; 1; 9	AVU; 2; 11	NOR; 1; 4	NOR; 2; 3	DIE; 1 Ret	DIE; 2; 9	NÜR; 1; 3	NÜR; 2; 4	ALE; 1 Ret	ALE; 2 Ret	MAG; 1; 3	MAG; 2; 4	HOC; 1; 8	HOC; 2; 16	6th	74

=== Complete Japanese Formula 3 results ===
(key) (Races in bold indicate pole position) (Races in italics indicate fastest lap)

Year	Team	Engine	1	2	3	4	5	6	7	8	9	10	DC	Pts
1996	TOM'S	Toyota	SUZ; 2	**TSU**; 4	MIN; 2	FUJ; 2	SUZ; 4	SUG; 1	SEN; 2	SUZ; 2	FUJ; C		3rd	33
1997	TOM'S	Toyota	SUZ; 1	**TSU**; 1	MIN; 2	**FUJ**; 1	**SUZ**; 1	SUG	**SEN**; 1	**MOT**; 1	FUJ; C	SUZ	1st	60

=== Complete JGTC results ===
(key) (Races in bold indicate pole position) (Races in italics indicate fastest lap)

Year	Team	Car	Class	1	2	3	4	5	6	7	8	DC	Pts
1998	Nakajima Racing	Honda NSX	GT500	SUZ; 2	**FUJ**; C	SEN; Ret	FUJ; 1	MOT; Ret	MIN; 2	SUG; Ret		**2nd**	**50**
1999	Nakajima Racing	Honda NSX	GT500	SUZ; 11	FUJ; 14	SUG; 4	MIN; Ret	FUJ; 8	**TAI**; 1	MOT; 5		5th	41
2003	Mugen	Honda NSX	GT500	TAI; 4	FUJ; Ret	SUG; 9	FUJ; 12	FUJ; 8	MOT; 1	AUT; 10	SUZ; 11	10th	38

=== Complete Formula Nippon results ===
(key) (Races in bold indicate pole position) (Races in italics indicate fastest lap)

Year	Entrant	1	2	3	4	5	6	7	8	9	10	DC	Points
1998	Nakajima Racing	SUZ; 8	MIN; 6	FUJ; Ret	MOT; 4	SUZ; 5	SUG; 5	FUJ; C	MIN; Ret	FUJ; Ret	SUZ; 14	11th	8
1999	Nakajima Racing	SUZ; 2	**MOT**; Ret	MIN; 3	FUJ; 1	SUZ; 2	**SUG**; 1	**FUJ**; 1	**MIN**; Ret	MOT; 3	SUZ; Ret	**1st**	**50**

=== Complete European Super Production Championship results ===
(key) (Races in bold indicate pole position) (Races in italics indicate fastest lap)

Year	Team	Car	1	2	3	4	5	6	7	8	9	10	DC	Pts
2001	Carly Motors	BMW 320i	MNZ	BRN	MAG	SIL	ZOL	HUN	A1R	NÜR	JAR	EST; 3	15th	12

=== Complete European Touring Car Championship results ===
(key) (Races in bold indicate pole position) (Races in italics indicate fastest lap)

Year	Team	Car	1	2	3	4	5	6	7	8	9	10	11	12	13	14	15	16	17	18	19	20	DC	Pts
2002	Carly Motors	BMW 320i	MAG; 1; 12	MAG; 2 Ret	SIL; 1; 8	SIL; 2 Ret	BRN; 1; 12	BRN; 2; 8	JAR; 1; 6	**JAR**; **2** Ret	AND; 1; 9	AND; 2; 7	**OSC**; **1** Ret	OSC; 2; 8	SPA; 1; 9	SPA; 2; 3	PER; 1	PER; 2	DON; 1; 7	DON; 2; 6	EST; 1; 3	EST; 2; 2	7th	16
2003	Carly Motors	BMW 320i	VAL; 1; 8	**VAL**; **2**; 8	MAG; 1; 7	MAG; 2; 4	PER; 1; 11	PER; 2; 8	BRN; 1	BRN; 2	DON; 1 Ret	DON; 2; 10	SPA; 1; 12	SPA; 2; 8	AND; 1; 11	AND; 2; 10	OSC; 1; 7	OSC; 2; 12	EST; 1; 11	EST; 2 Ret	MNZ; 1; 3	MNZ; 2; 2	10th	27
2004	Carly Motors	BMW 320i	MNZ; 1; 6	MNZ; 2; 4	VAL; 1; 10	VAL; 2; 9	MAG; 1 Ret	MAG; 2; 8	HOC; 1; 11	HOC; 2; 8	BRN; 1; 6	BRN; 2; 7	DON; 1; 13	DON; 2; 8	SPA; 1; 14	SPA; 2; 6	IMO; 1; 12	IMO; 2; 12	OSC; 1; 8	**OSC**; **2**; 4	DUB; 1	DUB; 2	12th	25

=== Complete World Touring Car Championship results ===
(key) (Races in bold indicate pole position) (Races in italics indicate fastest lap)

Year	Team	Car	1	2	3	4	5	6	7	8	9	10	11	12	13	14	15	16	17	18	19	20	21	22	23	24	DC	Points
2005	GR Asia	SEAT Toledo Cupra	ITA; 1; 15	ITA; 2 Ret	FRA; 1; 23	FRA; 2 DSQ	GBR; 1; 14	GBR; 2; 14	SMR; 1; 18	SMR; 2 Ret	MEX; 1; 8	**MEX**; **2**; 5	BEL; 1; 13	BEL; 2; 3	GER; 1; 21	GER; 2; 13	TUR; 1 Ret	TUR; 2 DNS	ESP; 1 NC	ESP; 2; 13	MAC; 1 Ret	MAC; 2 DNS					14th	11
2006	GR Asia	SEAT Toledo Cupra	ITA; 1 Ret	ITA; 2; 13	FRA; 1; 10	FRA; 2; 16																					17th	20
2006	GR Asia	SEAT León					GBR; 1; 13	GBR; 2; 14	GER; 1; 10	GER; 2; 12	BRA; 1; 14	BRA; 2; 11	MEX; 1; 4	MEX; 2; 6	CZE; 1; 6	CZE; 2; 23	TUR; 1; 8	**TUR**; **2**; 12	ESP; 1; 14	ESP; 2; 13	MAC; 1; 7	MAC; 2; 3					17th	20
2007	GR Asia	SEAT León	BRA; 1; 6	BRA; 2; 8	NED; 1 Ret	NED; 2; 14	ESP; 1; 21	ESP; 2; 25	FRA; 1; 9	FRA; 2 Ret	CZE; 1 Ret	CZE; 2; 11	POR; 1; 6	POR; 2; 4	SWE; 1; 4	SWE; 2; 4	GER; 1 Ret	GER; 2; 12	GBR; 1; 13	GBR; 2; 9	ITA; 1; 9	ITA; 2; 7	MAC; 1; 15	MAC; 2; 5			13th	29
2008	SUNRED Racing Development	SEAT León TFSI	BRA; 1; 7	**BRA**; **2**; 9	MEX; 1; 4	MEX; 2; 6	ESP; 1; 9	ESP; 2 DNS	FRA; 1; 14	FRA; 2; 9	CZE; 1; 18	CZE; 2; 12	POR; 1; 10	POR; 2; 12	GBR; 1; 5	GBR; 2; 22	GER; 1; 7	GER; 2; 2	EUR; 1; 15	EUR; 2; 15	ITA; 1; 10	ITA; 2; 24	JPN; 1; 8	**JPN**; **2**; 1	MAC; 1; 22	MAC; 2 Ret	14th	35
2009	SUNRED Engineering	SEAT León TFSI	BRA; 1; 9	BRA; 2; 8	MEX; 1; 15	MEX; 2; 15	MAR; 1; 21	MAR; 2; 8	FRA; 1; 8	FRA; 2; 19	ESP; 1; 7	ESP; 2; 10	CZE; 1; 9	CZE; 2; 9	POR; 1; 13	POR; 2; 12	GBR; 1; 10	GBR; 2; 11	GER; 1; 4	GER; 2; 8	ITA; 1; 5	ITA; 2; 14	JPN; 1; 10	JPN; 2; 13	MAC; 1; 13	MAC; 2 Ret	14th	15
2010	SR-Sport	SEAT León TDI	BRA; 1; 8	**BRA**; **2** Ret	MAR; 1; 5	MAR; 2; 3	ITA; 1; 5	ITA; 2; 2	BEL; 1; 8	BEL; 2; 10	POR; 1; 6	POR; 2; 6	GBR; 1; 5	GBR; 2; 4	CZE; 1 Ret	CZE; 2; 10	GER; 1; 6	GER; 2; 5	ESP; 1; 10	ESP; 2; 9	JPN; 1; 14	JPN; 2; 8	MAC; 1; 12	MAC; 2; 6			8th	136
2011	ROAL Motorsport	BMW 320 TC	BRA; 1; 4	BRA; 2; 2	BEL; 1 Ret	BEL; 2 DNS	ITA; 1; 5	ITA; 2; 15	HUN; 1; 18	HUN; 2; 4	CZE; 1; 4	CZE; 2; 2	POR; 1; 6	POR; 2; 5	GBR; 1; 4	**GBR**; **2**; 4	GER; 1; 10	GER; 2; 4	ESP; 1; 3	ESP; 2; 7	JPN; 1 NC	JPN; 2; 1	CHN; 1; 5	CHN; 2; 5	MAC; 1; 4	MAC; 2; 2	4th	233
2012	ROAL Motorsport	BMW 320 TC	ITA; 1; 5	ITA; 2; 4	ESP; 1; 3	ESP; 2; 2	MAR; 1; 8	MAR; 2; 4	SVK; 1; 14	SVK; 2; 4	HUN; 1; 6	HUN; 2; 12	AUT; 1; 8	AUT; 2; 3	POR; 1; 6	POR; 2; 3	BRA; 1; 8	BRA; 2; 7	USA; 1; 8	USA; 2; 5	JPN; 1; 6	JPN; 2; 15	CHN; 1; 4	CHN; 2; 3	MAC; 1; 6	MAC; 2 Ret	5th	207
2013	ROAL Motorsport	BMW 320 TC	ITA; 1; 9	ITA; 2; 11	MAR; 1; 9	MAR; 2; 6	SVK; 1; 5	**SVK**; **2**; 1	HUN; 1; 6	HUN; 2; 6	AUT; 1; 10	AUT; 2; 10	RUS; 1; 2	RUS; 2; 14	POR; 1; 7	POR; 2; 8	ARG; 1 NC	ARG; 2; 9	USA; 1; 7	USA; 2; 6	JPN; 1; 8	JPN; 2; 1	CHN; 1; 12	CHN; 2; 8	MAC; 1; 11	**MAC**; **2**; 3	10th	163
2014	ROAL Motorsport	Chevrolet RML Cruze TC1	MAR; 1 Ret	**MAR**; **2** Ret	FRA; 1 WD	FRA; 2 WD	HUN; 1; 8	HUN; 2; 4	SVK; 1; 4	SVK; 2 C	AUT; 1; 2	AUT; 2; 5	RUS; 1; 8	RUS; 2; 4	BEL; 1; 5	BEL; 2; 3	ARG; 1; 11	ARG; 2; 10	BEI; 1; 17†	BEI; 2; 2	CHN; 1; 8	CHN; 2; 6	JPN; 1; 7	JPN; 2; 4	MAC; 1; 7	MAC; 2; 8	7th	159
2015	ROAL Motorsport	Chevrolet RML Cruze TC1	ARG; 1; 14†	ARG; 2 Ret	MAR; 1 Ret	MAR; 2 Ret	HUN; 1; 10	HUN; 2; 2	GER; 1 Ret	GER; 2; 8	RUS; 1; 17†	RUS; 2; 10	SVK; 1; 9	SVK; 2; 10	FRA; 1; 12	FRA; 2; 7	POR; 1; 12	POR; 2; 11	JPN; 1 Ret	JPN; 2; 7	CHN; 1 Ret	CHN; 2 DNS	THA; 1 Ret	THA; 2 DNS	QAT; 1; 11	QAT; 2; 12	13th	39
2016	ROAL Motorsport	Chevrolet RML Cruze TC1	FRA; 1; 9	FRA; 2; 11	SVK; 1; 15	SVK; 2; 9	HUN; 1; 14	HUN; 2; 7	MAR; 1; 1	MAR; 2; 8	GER; 1 Ret	GER; 2 DNS	RUS; 1; 12	RUS; 2 Ret	**POR**; **1**; 1	POR; 2; 16	ARG; 1; 7	ARG; 2; 2	JPN; 1; 12	JPN; 2; 14	CHN; 1; 7	CHN; 2; 10	QAT; 1; 12	QAT; 2; 9			11th	111
2017	ROAL Motorsport	Chevrolet RML Cruze TC1	**MAR**; **1**; 8	MAR; 2; 8	**ITA**; **1**; 6	ITA; 2; 11	HUN; 1; 9	HUN; 2; 9	GER; 1; 8	GER; 2; 7	POR; 1 DNS	POR; 2 DNS	ARG; 1; 9	ARG; 2; 10	CHN; 1; 7†	CHN; 2; 9	JPN; 1; 13	JPN; 2; 13	MAC; 1; 2	MAC; 2; 6	QAT; 1; 11	QAT; 2; 11					11th	69

^{†} Driver did not finish the race, but was classified as he completed over 90% of the race distance.

=== Complete British Touring Car Championship results ===
(key) (Races in bold indicate pole position – 1 point awarded in first race) (Races in italics indicate fastest lap – 1 point awarded all races) (* signifies that driver lead race for at least one lap – 1 point awarded all races)

Year	Team	Car	1	2	3	4	5	6	7	8	9	10	11	12	13	14	15	16	17	18	19	20	21	22	23	24	25	26	27	28	29	30	DC	Pts
2007	SEAT Sport UK	SEAT León	BRH; 1	BRH; 2	BRH; 3	ROC; 1	ROC; 2	ROC; 3	THR; 1	THR; 2	THR; 3	CRO; 1	CRO; 2	CRO; 3	OUL; 1	OUL; 2	OUL; 3	DON; 1	DON; 2	DON; 3	SNE; 1	SNE; 2	SNE; 3	BRH; 1	BRH; 2	BRH; 3	KNO; 1	KNO; 2	KNO; 3	THR; 1; 8	THR; 2; 7	**THR**; **3**; 8	17th	10

=== Complete TCR International Series results ===
(key) (Races in bold indicate pole position) (Races in italics indicate fastest lap)

Year	Team	Car	1	2	3	4	5	6	7	8	9	10	11	12	13	14	15	16	17	18	19	20	DC	Points
2017	Boutsen Ginion Racing	Honda Civic Type R TCR	RIM; 1	RIM; 2	BHR; 1	BHR; 2	SPA; 1; 8	SPA; 2 Ret	MNZ; 1	MNZ; 2	SAL; 1	SAL; 2	HUN; 1	HUN; 2	OSC; 1	OSC; 2	CHA; 1	CHA; 2	ZHE; 1	ZHE; 2	DUB; 1	DUB; 2	31st	4

=== Complete World Touring Car Cup results ===
(key) (Races in bold indicate pole position) (Races in italics indicate fastest lap)

Year	Team	Car	1	2	3	4	5	6	7	8	9	10	11	12	13	14	15	16	17	18	19	20	21	22	23	24	25	26	27	28	29	30	DC	Points
2018	Boutsen Ginion Racing	Honda Civic Type R TCR	MAR; 1; 21†	MAR; 2; 10	MAR; 3; 12	HUN; 1 Ret	HUN; 2; 19	HUN; 3 Ret	GER; 1; 9	GER; 2; 9	GER; 3; 10	NED; 1; 7	NED; 2; 14	NED; 3 Ret	POR; 1 Ret	POR; 2; 15	POR; 3 Ret	SVK; 1; 7	SVK; 2 DNS	SVK; 3 DSQ	CHN; 1; 15	CHN; 2; 15	CHN; 3; 17	WUH; 1 Ret	WUH; 2 Ret	WUH; 3; 17	JPN; 1; 17	JPN; 2; 18	JPN; 3; 14	MAC; 1; 13	MAC; 2; 16	MAC; 3; 14	23rd	24
2019	Comtoyou Team DHL CUPRA Racing	CUPRA León TCR	MAR; 1 Ret	MAR; 2; 14	MAR; 3; 14	HUN; 1; 17	HUN; 2; 14	HUN; 3; 13	SVK; 1; 8	SVK; 2; 10	SVK; 3; 23	NED; 1; 16	NED; 2; 24	NED; 3; 20	GER; 1; 13	GER; 2; 10	GER; 3; 6	POR; 1; 17	POR; 2 DSQ	POR; 3; 16	CHN; 1; 24	CHN; 2; 8	CHN; 3; 12	JPN; 1; 16	JPN; 2; 22	JPN; 3 Ret	MAC; 1; 20	MAC; 2; 13	MAC; 3; 11	MAL; 1; 24	MAL; 2; 20	MAL; 3 Ret	22nd	63
2020	Comtoyou DHL Team Audi Sport	Audi RS 3 LMS TCR	BEL; 1; 4	BEL; 2; 6	GER; 1; 5	GER; 2; 8	SVK; 1; 6	SVK; 2; 1	SVK; 3; 6	HUN; 1; 11	HUN; 2; 17	HUN; 3; 13	ESP; 1; 19†	ESP; 2 Ret	ESP; 3; 8	ARA; 1; 12	ARA; 2; 15	ARA; 3; 15															11th	117
2021	Comtoyou DHL Team Audi Sport	Audi RS 3 LMS TCR	GER; 1; 7	GER; 2; 11	POR; 1; 17	POR; 2 Ret	ESP; 1; 3	ESP; 2 Ret	HUN; 1; 21	HUN; 2; 16	CZE; 1; 9	CZE; 2; 10	FRA; 1; 10	FRA; 2; 13	ITA; 1; 2	ITA; 2 NC	RUS; 1; 16	RUS; 2; 9															16th	83
2022	Comtoyou DHL Team Audi Sport	Audi RS 3 LMS TCR	FRA; 1; 11	FRA; 2; 12	GER; 1 C	GER; 2 C	HUN; 1; 15	HUN; 2; 13	ESP; 1 Ret	ESP; 2 Ret	POR; 1; 13	POR; 2; 12	ITA; 1; 6	ITA; 2; 7	ALS; 1; 6	ALS; 2; 11	BHR; 1; 6	BHR; 2; 6	SAU; 1; 3	SAU; 2; 6													10th	115

^{†} Driver did not finish the race, but was classified as he completed over 90% of the race distance.

=== Complete TCR Europe Touring Car Series results ===
(key) (Races in bold indicate pole position) (Races in italics indicate fastest lap)

Year	Team	Car	1	2	3	4	5	6	7	8	9	10	11	12	13	14	DC	Points
2019	Boutsen Ginion Racing	Honda Civic Type R TCR	HUN; 1	HUN; 2	HOC; 1; 11	HOC; 2; 10	SPA; 1; 10	SPA; 2; 25	RBR; 1; 19	RBR; 2; 18	OSC; 1; 2	OSC; 2; 2	CAT; 1; 6	CAT; 2; 8	MNZ; 1	MNZ; 2	12th	137
2020	Boutsen Ginion Racing	Honda Civic Type R TCR (FK8)	LEC; 1 Ret	LEC; 2 Ret	ZOL; 1	ZOL; 2	MNZ; 1	MNZ; 2	CAT; 1	CAT; 2	SPA; 1; 2^{2}	SPA; 2; 2	JAR; 1; 14	JAR; 2; 7			16th	100
2021	Comtoyou Racing	Audi RS 3 LMS TCR	**SVK**; **1**; 5	SVK; 2; 6	LEC; 1; 9	LEC; 2; 8	ZAN; 1; 1	ZAN; 2 Ret	SPA; 1; 10	SPA; 2; 10	NÜR; 1; 5	NÜR; 2 DNS	MNZ; 1; 3	MNZ; 2; 2	CAT; 1; 14	CAT; 2 WD	4th	258
2022	Comtoyou DHL Team Audi Sport	Audi RS 3 LMS TCR	ALG; 1; 8	ALG; 2; 3	**LEC**; **1**; 1	LEC; 2; 5	SPA; 1; 5	SPA; 2; 3	NOR; 1	NOR; 2	**NÜR**; **1**; 1	NÜR; 2 C	MNZ; 1; 13	MNZ; 2; 8	CAT; 1; 2	CAT; 2; 2	2nd	316
2023	Comtoyou Racing	Audi RS 3 LMS TCR	**ALG**; **1**; 11^{1}	ALG; 2; 5	PAU; 1; 6	PAU; 2; 1	SPA; 1; 7^{2}	SPA; 2; 3	HUN; 1; 11^{3}	HUN; 2; 9	LEC; 1; 4^{2}	LEC; 2; 3	MNZ; 1; 11	MNZ; 2; 3	**CAT**; **1**; 2^{1}	CAT; 2; 4	1st	468

=== TCR Spa 500 results ===
Year	Team	Co-Drivers	Car	Class	Laps	Pos.	Class Pos.
2019	(Netherlands) Red Camel-Jordans.nl	(Netherlands) Ivo Breukers (Netherlands) Rik Breukers (Spain) Pepe Oriola	CUPRA León TCR	**P**	454	**1st**	**1st**

=== Complete TCR World Tour results ===
(key) (Races in bold indicate pole position) (Races in italics indicate fastest lap)

Year	Team	Car	1	2	3	4	5	6	7	8	9	10	11	12	13	14	15	16	17	18	19	20	DC	Points
2023	Comtoyou Racing	Audi RS 3 LMS TCR	ALG; 1; 11	ALG; 2; 5	SPA; 1; 7	SPA; 2; 3	VAL; 1	VAL; 2	HUN; 1; 11	HUN; 2; 9	ELP; 1	ELP; 2	VIL; 1	VIL; 2	SYD; 1	SYD; 2	SYD; 3	BAT; 1	BAT; 2	BAT; 3	MAC; 1	MAC; 2	13th	76

Sporting positions
Preceded by Patrick Huisman	Dutch Production Car Championship; 2000cc Champion; 1992	Succeeded by Cor Euser
Preceded by Kurt Mollekens	Dutch Formula Ford Championship; Champion; 1993	Succeeded by unknown
Preceded by Kurt Mollekens	Masters of Formula 3 Winner; 1997	Succeeded by David Saelens
Preceded by Juichi Wakisaka	All-Japan Formula 3 Championship; Champion; 1997	Succeeded by Peter Dumbreck
Preceded by Satoshi Motoyama	Formula Nippon; Champion; 1999	Succeeded by Toranosuke Takagi
Preceded by Duncan Huisman	European Touring Car Championship; Independents' Trophy winner 2004	Succeeded by Marc Hennerici (WTCC)
Preceded by Marc Hennerici	World Touring Car Championship; Independents' Trophy winner 2006	Succeeded by Stefano D'Aste
Preceded by Sergio Hernández	World Touring Car Championship; Independents' Trophy winner 2009	Succeeded by Sergio Hernández
Preceded by Franco Girolami	TCR Europe Touring Car Series; Champion; 2023	Succeeded by Franco Girolami
