= 2003 European Touring Car Championship =

Motorsport contest

Seasons
- ← 2002 2004 →

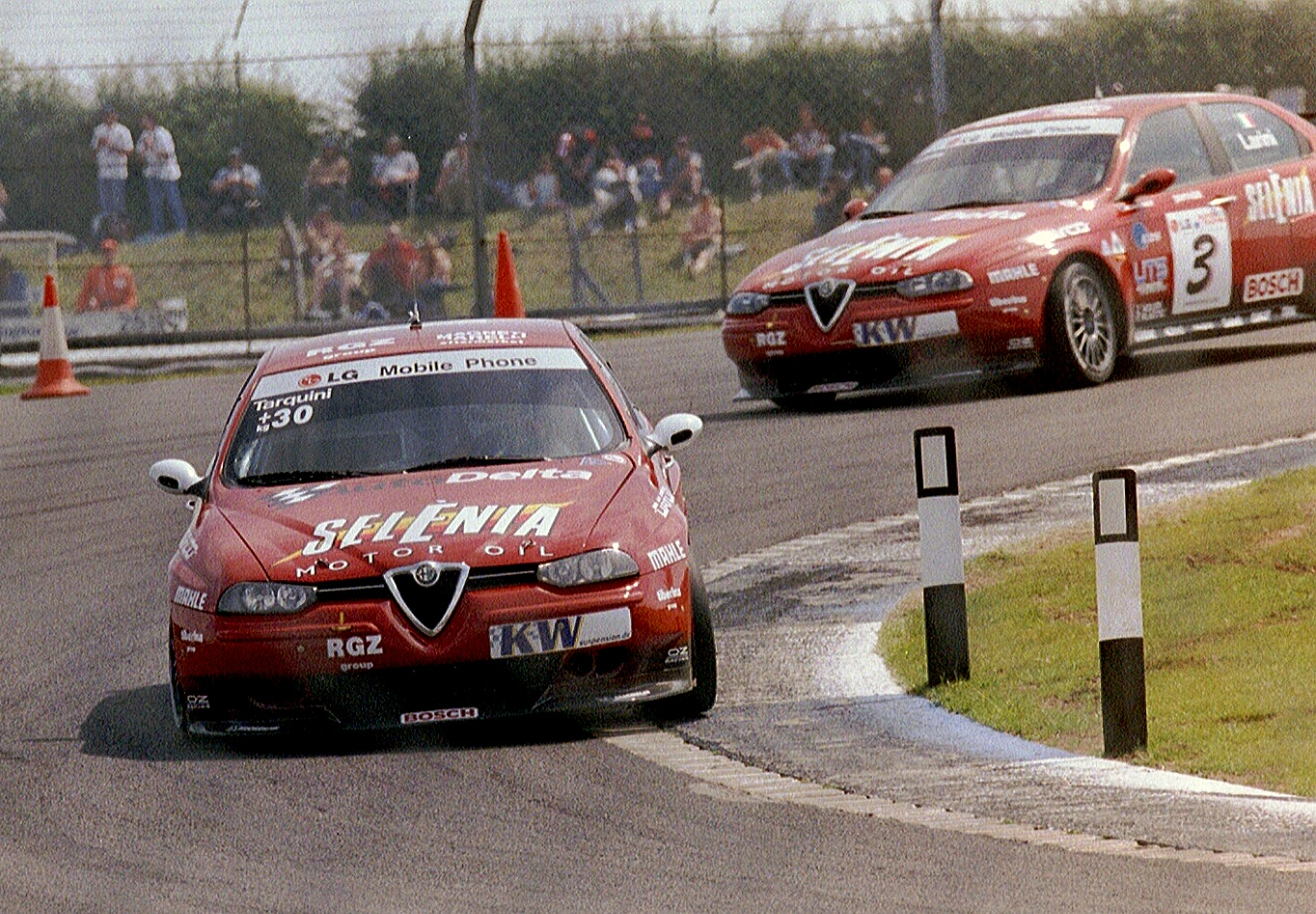
2003 champion Gabriele Tarquini

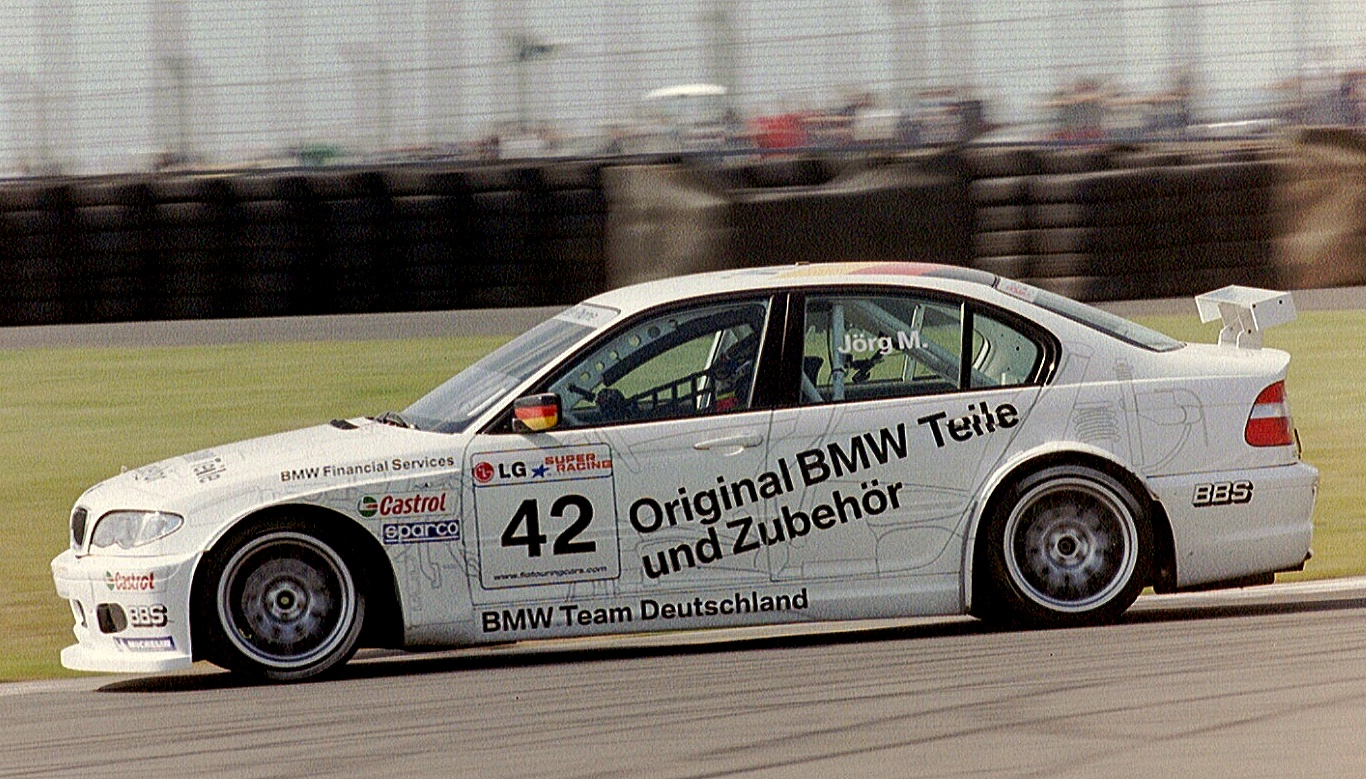
Second in the championship, Jörg Müller

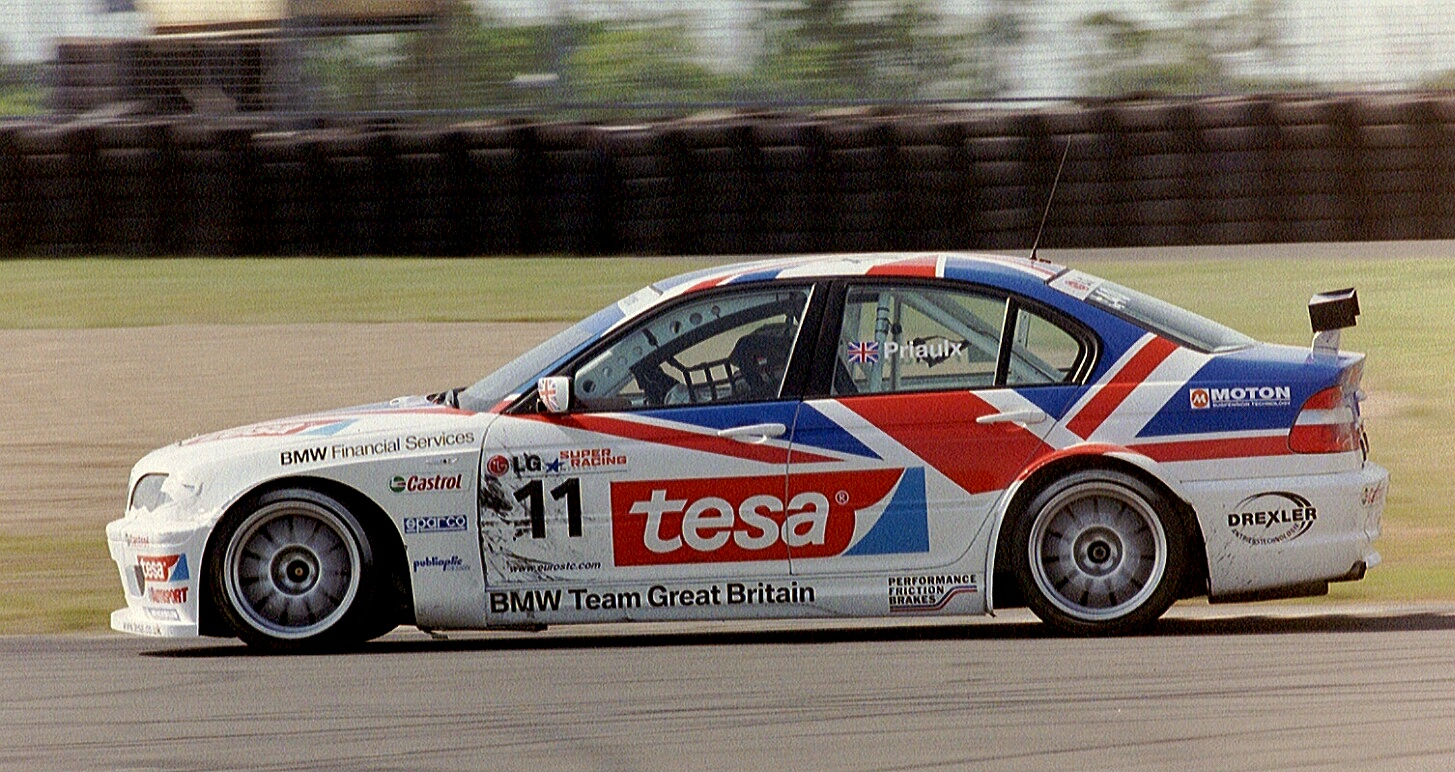
Third in the championship, Andy Priaulx

The 2003 FIA European Touring Car Championship was the second European Touring Car Championship season.

The season began at Barcelona on 6 April, and finished at Monza after twenty races over ten meetings.

== Teams and drivers ==
Team	Car	No.	Drivers	Rounds	Class
BMW Team Italy-Spain	BMW 320i	1	(Italy) Fabrizio Giovanardi	All	
BMW Team Italy-Spain	BMW 320i	2	(Spain) Antonio García	All	
BMW Team Italy-Spain	BMW 320i	33	(Italy) Alessandro Zanardi	10	*
(United Kingdom) BMW Team Great Britain	BMW 320i	11	(United Kingdom) Andy Priaulx	All	
(Germany) BMW Team Deutschland	BMW 320i	42	(Germany) Jörg Müller	All	
(Germany) BMW Team Deutschland	BMW 320i	43	(Germany) Dirk Müller	All	
(Italy) GTA Racing Team Nordauto	Alfa Romeo 156 GTA	3	(Italy) Nicola Larini	All	
(Italy) GTA Racing Team Nordauto	Alfa Romeo 156 GTA	4	(Italy) Gabriele Tarquini	All	
(Italy) GTA Racing Team Nordauto	Alfa Romeo 156 GTA	5	(Italy) Roberto Colciago	All	
(Italy) GTA Racing Team Nordauto	Alfa Romeo 156 GTA	6	(Germany) Sebastian Stahl	8	
(Italy) GTA Racing Team Nordauto	Alfa Romeo 156 GTA	56	(United Kingdom) James Thompson	9–10	
(Italy) GTA Racing Team Nordauto	Alfa Romeo 156 GTA	66	(Italy) Giancarlo Fisichella	10	
(Spain) SEAT Sport	SEAT Toledo Cupra	9	(Spain) Jordi Gené	All	
(Spain) SEAT Sport	SEAT Toledo Cupra	10	(Germany) Frank Diefenbacher	All	
(Spain) SEAT Sport	SEAT Toledo Cupra	30	(France) Yvan Muller	9–10	
(Italy) PRO Motorsport	Honda Civic Type-R	12	(Macau) André Couto	All	I
(Italy) PRO Motorsport	Honda Civic Type-R	14	(Spain) Jordi Palomeras	1	I
(Italy) PRO Motorsport	Honda Civic Type-R	14	(Portugal) Miguel Ramos	2, 4	I
(Italy) PRO Motorsport	Honda Civic Type-R	14	(Italy) Salvatore Tavano	5–6	I
(Italy) PRO Motorsport	Honda Civic Type-R	19	(Sweden) Tomas Engström	7–10	I
(Italy) Clever Cats Team	Alfa Romeo 156 GTA	15	(Italy) Fabio Francia	All	I
(Italy) Clever Cats Team	Alfa Romeo 156 GTA	16	(Italy) Paolo Ruberti	All	I
(Sweden) Flash Engineering	Volvo S60	18	(Sweden) Jan Nilsson	1	I
(Netherlands) Carly Motors	BMW 320i	20	(Netherlands) Tom Coronel	1–3, 5–10	I
(Netherlands) Carly Motors	BMW 320i	21	(Netherlands) Duncan Huisman	All	I
(Netherlands) Carly Motors	BMW 320i	22	(Netherlands) Donald Molenaar	4	I
(Italy) Scuderia Bigazzi	Alfa Romeo 156 GTA	24	(Italy) Alessandro Balzan	All	I
(Italy) Scuderia Bigazzi	Alfa Romeo 156 GTA	25	(France) Éric Cayrolle	1–6	I
(Italy) Scuderia Bigazzi	Alfa Romeo 156 GTA	26	(Sweden) Mattias Andersson	7	I
(Italy) Scuderia Bigazzi	Alfa Romeo 156 GTA	26	(Germany) Reinhard Huber	8	I
(Italy) Scuderia Bigazzi	Alfa Romeo 156 GTA	26	(Italy) Adriano de Micheli	10	*
(Sweden) Podium Racing	SEAT Toledo Cupra	27	(Sweden) Johan Stureson	7	
(Sweden) Podium Racing	SEAT Toledo Cupra	28	(Sweden) Niklas Karlsson	7	
(Italy) ART Engineering	Volvo S60	60	(Sweden) Rickard Rydell	1–9	I
(Italy) ART Engineering	Volvo S60	61	(Italy) Sandro Sardelli	All	I

Icon	Class
I	Independents' Championship
*	Guest drivers ineligible for points

== Results and standings ==
=== Races ===
Race	Race Name	Date	Pole Position	Fastest lap	Winning driver	Winning team	Winning independent
1	(Spain) Circuit de Catalunya	6 April	(Italy) Gabriele Tarquini	(Spain) Antonio Garcia	(Italy) Gabriele Tarquini	(Italy) GTA Racing Team Nordauto	(Netherlands) Tom Coronel
2	(Spain) Circuit de Catalunya	6 April		(Germany) Dirk Müller	(Germany) Dirk Müller	(Germany) Team Schnitzer	(Netherlands) Tom Coronel
3	(France) Magny-Cours	27 April	(Italy) Nicola Larini	(Germany) Jörg Müller	(Germany) Jörg Müller	(Germany) Team Schnitzer	(Netherlands) Duncan Huisman
4	(France) Magny-Cours	27 April		(Germany) Jörg Müller	(Germany) Jörg Müller	(Germany) Team Schnitzer	(Netherlands) Duncan Huisman
5	(Italy) Pergusa	11 May	(Italy) Roberto Colciago	(Italy) Gabriele Tarquini	(Italy) Roberto Colciago	(Italy) GTA Racing Team Nordauto	(Italy) Fabio Francia
6	(Italy) Pergusa	11 May		(Italy) Roberto Colciago	(Italy) Gabriele Tarquini	(Italy) GTA Racing Team Nordauto	(Italy) Alessandro Balzan
7	(Czech Republic) Brno	25 May	(Spain) Antonio Garcia	(Germany) Dirk Müller	(Germany) Dirk Müller	(Germany) Team Schnitzer	(Netherlands) Duncan Huisman
8	(Czech Republic) Brno	25 May		(Germany) Dirk Müller	(United Kingdom) Andy Priaulx	(United Kingdom) BMW Team Great Britain	(Sweden) Rickard Rydell
9	(United Kingdom) Donington Park	29 June	(Italy) Nicola Larini	(Italy) Gabriele Tarquini	(Italy) Gabriele Tarquini	(Italy) GTA Racing Team Nordauto	(Sweden) Rickard Rydell
10	(United Kingdom) Donington Park	29 June		(Germany) Jörg Müller	(Germany) Jörg Müller	(Germany) Team Schnitzer	(Netherlands) Duncan Huisman
11	(Belgium) Spa-Francorchamps	26 July	(United Kingdom) Andy Priaulx	(United Kingdom) Andy Priaulx	(Italy) Gabriele Tarquini	(Italy) GTA Racing Team Nordauto	(Netherlands) Duncan Huisman
12	(Belgium) Spa-Francorchamps	26 July		(Germany) Dirk Müller	(United Kingdom) Andy Priaulx	(United Kingdom) BMW Team Great Britain	(Netherlands) Duncan Huisman
13	(Sweden) Anderstorp	7 September	(Italy) Nicola Larini	(Italy) Roberto Colciago	(Italy) Roberto Colciago	(Italy) GTA Racing Team Nordauto	(Netherlands) Duncan Huisman
14	(Sweden) Anderstorp	7 September		(Italy) Nicola Larini	(Italy) Nicola Larini	(Italy) GTA Racing Team Nordauto	(Sweden) Rickard Rydell
15	(Germany) Oschersleben	21 September	(Germany) Jörg Müller	(Italy) Gabriele Tarquini	(Germany) Jörg Müller	(Germany) Team Schnitzer	(Netherlands) Tom Coronel
16	(Germany) Oschersleben	21 September		(Italy) Gabriele Tarquini	(United Kingdom) Andy Priaulx	(United Kingdom) BMW Team Great Britain	(Netherlands) Duncan Huisman
17	(Portugal) Estoril	5 October	(Italy) Nicola Larini	(Germany) Dirk Müller	(Italy) Gabriele Tarquini	(Italy) GTA Racing Team Nordauto	(Netherlands) Duncan Huisman
18	(Portugal) Estoril	5 October		(Italy) Nicola Larini	(Italy) Gabriele Tarquini	(Italy) GTA Racing Team Nordauto	(Netherlands) Duncan Huisman
19	(Italy) Monza	19 October	(Germany) Jörg Müller	(United Kingdom) Andy Priaulx	(United Kingdom) James Thompson	(Italy) GTA Racing Team Nordauto	(Netherlands) Tom Coronel
20	(Italy) Monza	19 October		(Germany) Jörg Müller	(Germany) Jörg Müller	(Germany) Team Schnitzer	(Netherlands) Tom Coronel

== Championship standings ==
Points system
**1st**	**2nd**	**3rd**	**4th**	**5th**	**6th**	**7th**	**8th**
10	8	6	5	4	3	2	1

=== Drivers' Championship ===
Pos	Driver	BAR (Spain)		MAG (France)		PER (Italy)		BRN (Czech Republic)		DON (United Kingdom)		SPA (Belgium)		AND (Sweden)		OSC (Germany)		EST (Portugal)		MON (Italy)		Pts
1	(Italy) Gabriele Tarquini	**1**	4	4	Ret	3	1	6	4	1	17	1	14	Ret	DNS	2	5	1	1	4	3	107
2	(Germany) Jörg Müller	4	2	1	1	6	Ret	DSQ	16†	4	1	3	4	4	4	**1**	4	4	5	**11**†	1	106
3	(United Kingdom) Andy Priaulx	6	3	3	Ret	4	4	4	1	15	5	**6**	1	8	**2**	3	1	7	4	2	6	100
4	(Italy) Nicola Larini	7	6	**2**	2	7	5	13	5	**2**	4	4	2	**6**	1	17†	8	**2**	2	10†	4	92
5	(Germany) Dirk Müller	5	1	11	Ret	2	Ret	1	3	3	16	2	3	3	Ret	9	Ret	13	7	Ret	DNS	66
6	(Italy) Roberto Colciago	9	11	5	5	**1**	2	8	6	6	11	8	**5**	1	Ret	5	6	3	3	DSQ	12†	66
7	(Netherlands) Duncan Huisman	19†	DNS	6	3	13	9	5	Ret	8	**2**	7	6	5	7	11	7	5	6	5	Ret	47
8	(Spain) Antonio Garcia	3	7	14	8	9	7	**2**	7	Ret	DNS	17†	12	2	5	4	2	19†	DNS	Ret	DNS	46
9	(Italy) Fabrizio Giovanardi	2	5	Ret	7	10	10	3	2	11	18†	5	16†	10	6	8	**Ret**	10	12	6	5	43
10	(Netherlands) Tom Coronel	8	**8**	7	4	11	8			Ret	10	12	8	11	10	7	12	11	Ret	3	2	27
11	(Sweden) Rickard Rydell	18†	10	Ret	Ret	14	Ret	Ret	9	5	3	11	Ret	7	3	12	13	Ret	DNS			18
12	(United Kingdom) James Thompson																	8	**8**	1	Ret	12
13	(Italy) Paolo Ruberti	Ret	13	8	**Ret**	12	6	12	11	7	8	9	7	9	Ret	Ret	DNS	6	16	NC	Ret	12
14	(Italy) Alessandro Balzan	10	12	Ret	Ret	8	**3**	7	**Ret**	16†	15	14	10	13	8	15	10	9	11	Ret	11	10
15	(Germany) Frank Diefenbacher	12	Ret	12	10	Ret	11†	10	10	13	9	Ret	13	15	12	6	3	15	13	Ret	Ret	9
16	(Italy) Fabio Francia	11	9	10	9	5	Ret	11	13	Ret	DNS	10	9	18	11	14	9	16	10	Ret	9	4
17	(Spain) Jordi Gené	13	16†	9	6	Ret	12†	9	8	10	12	13	11	21	13	10	14	14	14	NC	10	4
18	(Macau) Andre Couto	Ret	DNS	15	Ret	Ret	Ret	15	15	12	6	18†	15	12	14	16	15†	20	Ret	Ret	DNS	3
19	(Italy) Salvatore Tavano									9	7	16	Ret									2
20	(Sweden) Tomas Engström													14	9	13	11	12	9	8	Ret	1
21	(Italy) Sandro Sardelli	17	15	13	Ret	15†	DNS	Ret	DNS	Ret	13	15	Ret	20	Ret	18†	DNS	18†	15	9	Ret	0
22	(France) Éric Cayrolle	14	14	NC	Ret	Ret	DNS	14	12	14	14	Ret	DNS									0
23	(Netherlands) Donald Molenaar							Ret	14													0
24	(Sweden) Mattias Andersson													17	15							0
25	(Spain) Jordi Palomeras Ventós	15	Ret																			0
26	(Sweden) Jan Nilsson	16	Ret																			0
27	(Sweden) Johan Stureson													16	16†							0
28	(Sweden) Niklas Karlsson													19	17†							0
29	(France) Yvan Muller																	17†	DNS	Ret	Ret	0
30	(Germany) Reinhard Huber															19†	DNS					0
-	(Portugal) Miguel Ramos			DNS	DNS			Ret	DNS													0
-	(Germany) Sebastian Stahl															Ret	DNS					0
-	(Italy) Giancarlo Fisichella																			DNS	DNS	0
Guest drivers ineligible for points.
	(Italy) Adriano de Micheli																			7	**8**	0
	(Italy) Alessandro Zanardi																			Ret	7	0
Pos	Driver	VAL (Spain)		MAG (France)		PER (Italy)		BRN (Czech Republic)		DON (United Kingdom)		SPA (Belgium)		AND (Sweden)		OSC (Germany)		EST (Portugal)		MON (Italy)		Pts

Colour	Result
Gold	Winner
Silver	Second place
Bronze	Third place
Green	Points classification
Blue	Non-points classification
Blue	Non-classified finish (NC)
Purple	Retired, not classified (Ret)
Red	Did not qualify (DNQ)
Red	Did not pre-qualify (DNPQ)
Black	Disqualified (DSQ)
White	Did not start (DNS)
White	Withdrew (WD)
White	Race cancelled (C)
Blank	Did not practice (DNP)
Blank	Did not arrive (DNA)
Blank	Excluded (EX)

**Bold** - Pole
Italics - Fastest Lap

† — Drivers did not finish the race, but were classified as they completed over 90% of the race distance.
