= Carly Motors =

Dutch motorsports company

(Netherlands) Carly Motors
- Founded: 1979
- Base: Leiden, South Holland
- Team principal(s): Carly Pellinkhof
- Former series: Dutch Touring Car Championship; European Touring Car Championship; Guia Race of Macau
- Noted drivers: (Netherlands) Cor Euser (Netherlands) Duncan Huisman (Netherlands) Peter Kox (Netherlands) Tom Coronel (Italy) Gianni Morbidelli (Belgium) Pierre-Yves Corthals
- Drivers' Championships: 1999 Dutch Touring Car Championship; 2000 Dutch Touring Car Championship; 2000 Guia Race of Macau; 2001 Dutch Touring Car Championship; 2001 Guia Race of Macau; 2002 Dutch Touring Car Championship; 2002 Guia Race of Macau; 2003 Guia Race of Macau

Carly Motors is a Dutch motorsports company. Carly Motors started tuning racing engines but grew into one of the top teams of the European Touring Car Championship and the Guia Race of Macau between 2001 and 2004.

== History ==
Carly Pellinkhof started her racing career in 1968 and opened her own tuning workshop company in 1979. Her company supported the Mercedes-Benz factory supported teams in the Deutsche Tourenwagen Meisterschaft. In 1992 Pellinkhof started her own racing team.

=== Deutsche Tourenwagen Meisterschaft ===
Carly Motors ran a BMW M3 in the 1991 Deutsche Tourenwagen Meisterschaft. Entered under Marlboro BMW Dealer Team Cor Euser was the team's sole driver. Eusers best result was a thirteenth place at the Norisring.

=== Dutch Touring Car Championship ===
Carly Motors entered four BMW 325i's in the 1992 Dutch Production Car Championship. Marcel van Vliet, Ger van Krimpen, Heikki Salmenoutio and Salvatore Santisi raced the cars in the 'over 2000cc' class. Van Vliet was the first driver to win during the season, at Circuit Zandvoort. While Team Lotus driver Tom Langeberg won the championship, Carly Motors drivers Van Vliet and Salmenoutio finished second and third.

Starting in 1997 the Dutch Touring Car Championship following Group N regulations was formed. Under the name H&P Panorama Team Carly Motors started the season with Duncan Huisman and Sandor van Es. The duo dominated the inaugural season with Huisman taking the title and Van Es finishing second in the series standings. Van Es and Huisman remained at the H&P Panorama Team for 1998. The team faced heavy competition, mainly from Renault. Van Es won three races and placed second in the series standings. Cor Euser returned to the team in 1999. Euser won five races and clinched the championship in the final weekend over Frans Verschuur. For 2000 the team returned to dominance with Huisman and Van Es but it was sometimes controversial. In the second round of the championship the team won both races but was later disqualified on technical grounds. During the third round of the championship Van Es was leading the race but let Huisman pass in the last round. Pellinkhof ordered Van Es to slow down to let Huisman pass. The team won nine out of thirteen races with Huisman winning the championship over Van Es. Huisman won the series championship over Van Es. In 2001 the Carly Motors built BMW's again caused controversy. Their dominance was questioned by other teams. Some of the teams wanted the organisation to add weight to the Carly Motors cars. Van Es won two races but was a constant top five finisher to clinch the championship. Teammate Tom Coronel made his debut in the series winning three races and ended fifth in the standings. In 2002 the Dutch Touring Car Championship struggled to attract a representative grid. A low point was reached in July when only nine cars started the race. The championship was won by Huisman winning nine races out of fifteen. Teammate Molenaar finished third in the championship. The duo was split by Renault works driver Jeroen Bleekemolen.

=== European Touring Car Championship ===
With the Super Production class added to the European Touring Car Championship in 2001 Carly Motors joined the series. The team raced the championship with two BMW 320i's for Dutchman Duncan Huisman and Swede Peggen Andersson. The duo competed the full season while Carly Motors entered three other cars in selected races. Huisman started the season strong with two second place finishes, only beaten by countryman Peter Kox. Huisman won at Magny-Cours, Zolder and the Hungaroring. Huisman settled for second in the championship, behind Kox. Andersson settled for seventh in the championship with two fourth places as his best result. At the season finale at Estoril two guest drivers scored the best results for Carly Motors. Sandor van Es and Tom Coronel finished second and third, behind CiBiEmme Team driver Gianni Morbidelli.

For 2002 the Super Production, FIA Group N, became the main class of the championship, replacing Super Touring.

The team intended to enter the 2004 British Touring Car Championship with a pair of BMW 320is for Tom Ferrier and James Hanson but this never happened.

=== Current company ===
Carly Motors continues to fine-tune engines, with a focus on software remapping for race teams with cars competing on the highest level of motorsport as well as regular street and muscle cars. Carly Motors delivers taylormade remapping of the Engine Controle Unit (ECU) for the best needed performance within the safe zone.

== Motorsport results ==
=== Deutsche Tourenwagen Meisterschaft ===
(key) (Races in bold indicate pole position) (Races in italics indicate fastest lap)

Year	Car	No.	Drivers	1	2	3	4	5	6	7	8	9	10	11	12	13	14	15	16	17	18	19	20	21	22	23	24	Pos.	Pts
1991	BMW M3 Sport Evo	42	(Netherlands) Cor Euser	ZOL; 1; 18	ZOL; 2; 19	HOC; 1	HOC; 2	NÜR; 1; 20	NÜR; 2 Ret	AVU; 1	AVU; 2	WUN; 1 Ret	WUN; 2 DNS	NOR; 1; 21	NOR; 2; 13	DIE; 1; 17	DIE; 2 Ret	NÜR; 1; 22	NÜR; 2; 20	ALE; 1	ALE; 2	HOC; 1; 21	HOC; 2; 14	BRN; 1	BRN; 2	DON; 1	DON; 2	-	0

=== European Touring Car Championship ===
(key) (Races in bold indicate pole position) (Races in italics indicate fastest lap)

Year	Car	No.	Drivers	1	2	3	4	5	6	7	8	9	10	11	12	13	14	15	16	17	18	19	20	DC	Pts
2001	BMW 320i	12	(Sweden) Peggen Andersson	MNZ; 5	BRN; Ret	MAG; 2	SIL; Ret	ZOL; Ret	HUN; 3	A1R; 6	NÜR; 8	JAR; 6	EST; 9											7th	46
2001	BMW 320i	14	(Netherlands) Duncan Huisman	MNZ; 2	BRN; 2	MAG; 1	SIL; 3	ZOL; 1	HUN; 1	A1R; Ret	NÜR; 3	JAR; Ret	EST; Ret											2nd	114
2001	BMW 320i	15	(Belgium) Guino Kenis	MNZ; 8		MAG; 6																		18th	9
2001	BMW 320i	15	(Belgium) Patrick Beliën		BRN; 10								EST; 12											25th	1
2001	BMW 320i	15	(Belgium) Frédéric Bouvy				SIL; 6	ZOL; Ret																21st	6
2001	BMW 320i	15	(Belgium) Peter Beckers						HUN; 12			JAR; 11												26th	0
2001	BMW 320i	15	(Belgium) Jean-Michel Martin							A1R; 5	NÜR; 10													17th	9
2001	BMW 320i	38	(Netherlands) Tom Coronel	MNZ	BRN	MAG	SIL	ZOL	HUN	A1R	NÜR	JAR	EST; 3											15th	12
2001	BMW 320i	39	(Netherlands) Sandor van Es	MNZ	BRN	MAG	SIL	ZOL	HUN	A1R	NÜR	JAR	EST; 2											13th	15
2002	BMW 320i	7	(Netherlands) Tom Coronel	MAG; 1; 12	MAG; 2 Ret	SIL; 1; 8	SIL; 2 Ret	BRN; 1; 12	BRN; 2; 8	JAR; 1; 6	JAR; 2 Ret	AND; 1; 9	AND; 2; 7	OSC; 1 Ret	OSC; 2; 8	SPA; 1; 9	SPA; 2; 3	PER; 1	PER; 2	DON; 1; 7	DON; 2; 6	EST; 1; 3	EST; 2; 2	7th	16
2002	BMW 320i	8	(Italy) Gianni Morbidelli	MAG; 1; 10	MAG; 2; 7	SIL; 1; 15	SIL; 2 DNS	BRN; 1 Ret	BRN; 2 DNS	JAR; 1; 16	JAR; 2 Ret													-	0
2002	BMW 320i	8	(Netherlands) Duncan Huisman									AND; 1; 18	AND; 2; 11	OSC; 1	OSC; 2	SPA; 1 Ret	SPA; 2 Ret	PER; 1	PER; 2	DON; 1; 6	DON; 2; 2	EST; 1 Ret	EST; 2; 5	9th	9
2002	BMW 320i	9	(Netherlands) Peter Kox	MAG; 1; 8	MAG; 2 Ret	SIL; 1 Ret	SIL; 2 DNS	BRN; 1; 8	BRN; 2 Ret	JAR; 1; 7	JAR; 2; 6	AND; 1; 8	AND; 2; 8	OSC; 1	OSC; 2	SPA; 1	SPA; 2	PER; 1	PER; 2	DON; 1	DON; 2	EST; 1	EST; 2	17th	1
2002	BMW 320i	22	(Belgium) Pierre-Yves Corthals	MAG; 1	MAG; 2	SIL; 1	SIL; 2	BRN; 1	BRN; 2	JAR; 1	JAR; 2	AND; 1	AND; 2	OSC; 1	OSC; 2	SPA; 1; 6	SPA; 2 Ret	PER; 1	PER; 2	DON; 1; 15	DON; 2 DNS	EST; 1	EST; 2	19th	1
2003	BMW 320i	20	(Netherlands) Tom Coronel	VAL; 1; 8	VAL; 2; 8	MAG; 1; 7	MAG; 2; 4	PER; 1; 11	PER; 2; 8	BRN; 1	BRN; 2	DON; 1 Ret	DON; 2; 10	SPA; 1; 12	SPA; 2; 8	AND; 1; 11	AND; 2; 10	OSC; 1; 7	OSC; 2; 12	EST; 1; 11	EST; 2 Ret	MNZ; 1; 3	MNZ; 2; 2	10th	27
2003	BMW 320i	21	(Netherlands) Duncan Huisman	VAL; 1; 19	VAL; 2 DNS	MAG; 1; 6	MAG; 2; 3	PER; 1; 13	PER; 2; 9	BRN; 1; 5	BRN; 2 Ret	DON; 1; 8	DON; 2; 2	SPA; 1; 7	SPA; 2; 6	AND; 1; 5	AND; 2; 7	OSC; 1; 11	OSC; 2; 7	EST; 1; 5	EST; 2; 6	MNZ; 1; 5	MNZ; 2 Ret	7th	47
2003	BMW 320i	22	(Netherlands) Donald Molenaar	VAL; 1	VAL; 2	MAG; 1	MAG; 2	PER; 1	PER; 2	BRN; 1 Ret	BRN; 2; 14	DON; 1	DON; 2	SPA; 1	SPA; 2	AND; 1	AND; 2	OSC; 1	OSC; 2	EST; 1	EST; 2	MNZ; 1	MNZ; 2	-	0
2004	BMW 320i	20	(Netherlands) Tom Coronel	MNZ; 1; 6	MNZ; 2; 4	VAL; 1; 10	VAL; 2; 9	MAG; 1 Ret	MAG; 2; 8	HOC; 1; 11	HOC; 2; 8	BRN; 1; 6	BRN; 2; 7	DON; 1; 13	DON; 2; 8	SPA; 1; 14	SPA; 2; 6	IMO; 1; 12	IMO; 2; 12	OSC; 1; 8	OSC; 2; 4	DUB; 1	DUB; 2	12th	25
2004	BMW 320i	21	(Netherlands) Paulien Zwart	MNZ; 1; 16	MNZ; 2; 15	VAL; 1; 18	VAL; 2; 17	MAG; 1	MAG; 2	HOC; 1	HOC; 2	BRN; 1	BRN; 2	DON; 1	DON; 2	SPA; 1 Ret	SPA; 2 DNS	IMO; 1	IMO; 2	OSC; 1	OSC; 2	DUB; 1	DUB; 2	-	0
2004	BMW 320i	22	(Netherlands) Klaas Zwart	MNZ; 1	MNZ; 2	VAL; 1	VAL; 2	MAG; 1; 17	MAG; 2 Ret	HOC; 1	HOC; 2	BRN; 1; 23	BRN; 2; 15	DON; 1 Ret	DON; 2 Ret	SPA; 1	SPA; 2	IMO; 1	IMO; 2	OSC; 1	OSC; 2	DUB; 1	DUB; 2	-	0
2004	BMW 320i	26	(Netherlands) Duncan Huisman	MNZ; 1	MNZ; 2	VAL; 1	VAL; 2	MAG; 1	MAG; 2	HOC; 1	HOC; 2	BRN; 1	BRN; 2	DON; 1	DON; 2	SPA; 1	SPA; 2	IMO; 1	IMO; 2	OSC; 1; 10	OSC; 2; 10	DUB; 1	DUB; 2	-	0

=== Guia Race of Macau ===
Year	No.	Driver	Car	Race 1	Race 2
2000	26	(Netherlands) Duncan Huisman	BMW 320i	Ret	DNS
2000	27	(Netherlands) Patrick Huisman	BMW 320i	1st	1st
2001	7	(Netherlands) Tom Coronel	BMW 320i	1st	Ret
2001	6	(Netherlands) Duncan Huisman	BMW 320i	2nd	1st
2002	25	(Macau) Andre Couto	BMW 320i	2nd	Ret
2002	26	(Netherlands) Duncan Huisman	BMW 320i	1st	1st
2002	27	(Germany) Jörg Müller	BMW 320i	6th	Ret
2003	1	(Netherlands) Duncan Huisman	BMW 320i	1st	1st
2003	2	(Germany) Jörg Müller	BMW 320i	24th	DNS
2003	3	(United Kingdom) Andy Priaulx	BMW 320i	2nd	DNS
2004	1	(Netherlands) Duncan Huisman	BMW 320i	Ret	6th
2004	2	(Netherlands) Tom Coronel	BMW 320i	5th	4th
