= European Touring Car Championship =

Auto racing championship in Europe

- Category: Touring cars
- Country: Europe
- Inaugural season: 1963
- Folded: 2004
- Drivers: 41 (2004)
- Teams: 13 (2004)
- Constructors: 6 (2004)
- Last Drivers' champion: (United Kingdom) Andy Priaulx
- Last Makes' champion: BMW

The European Touring Car Championship was an international touring car racing series organised by the FIA. It had two incarnations, the first one between 1963 and 1988, and the second between 2000 and 2004. In 2005 it was superseded by the World Touring Car Championship, and replaced by the European Touring Car Cup between 2005 and 2017 when became also defunct.

== History ==
=== European Touring Car Challenge / Championship (1963–1988) ===
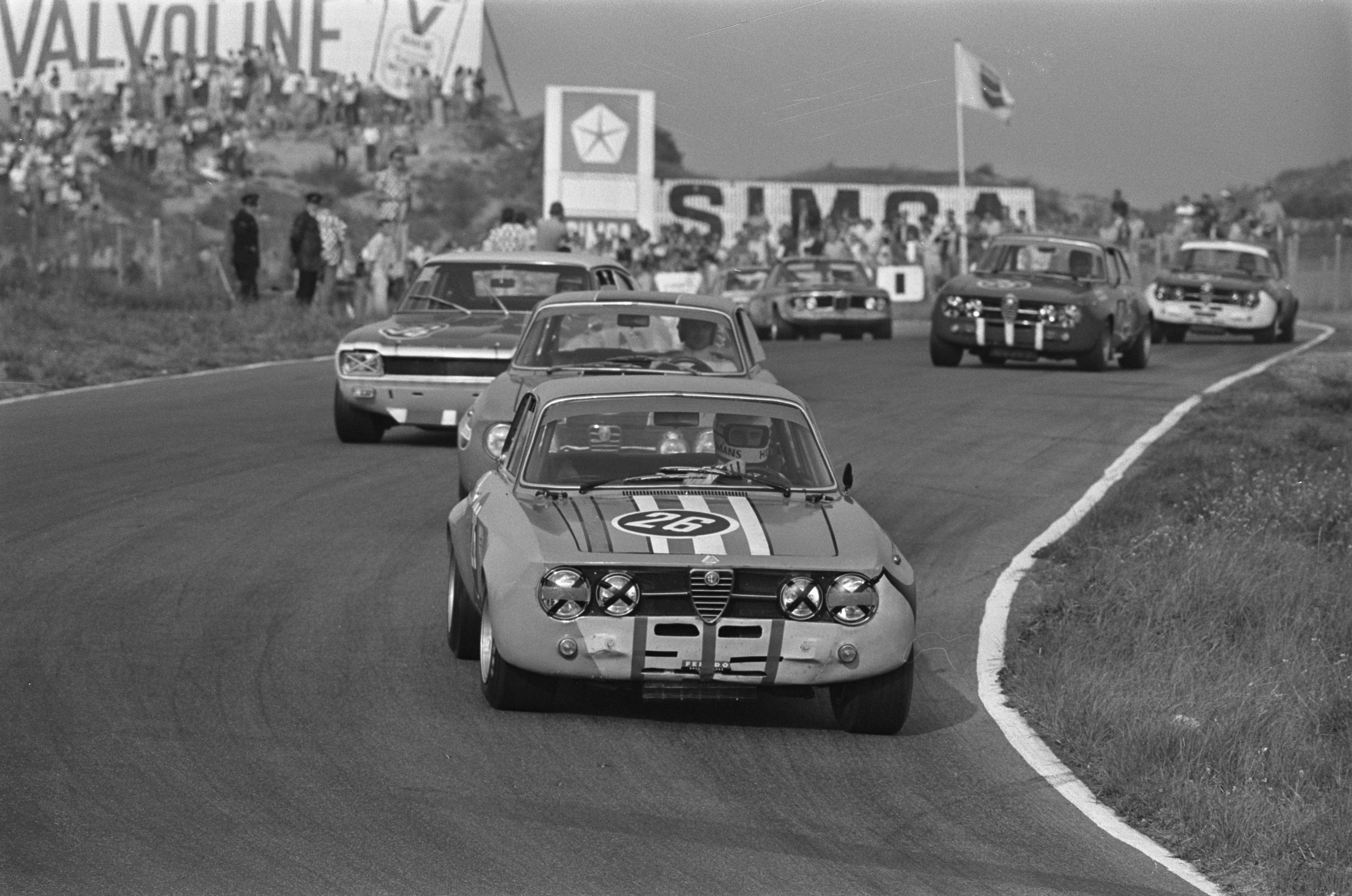
Autodelta S.p.A. Alfa Romeo 2000 GTAm, Toine Hezemans 1970 ETCC Zandvoort

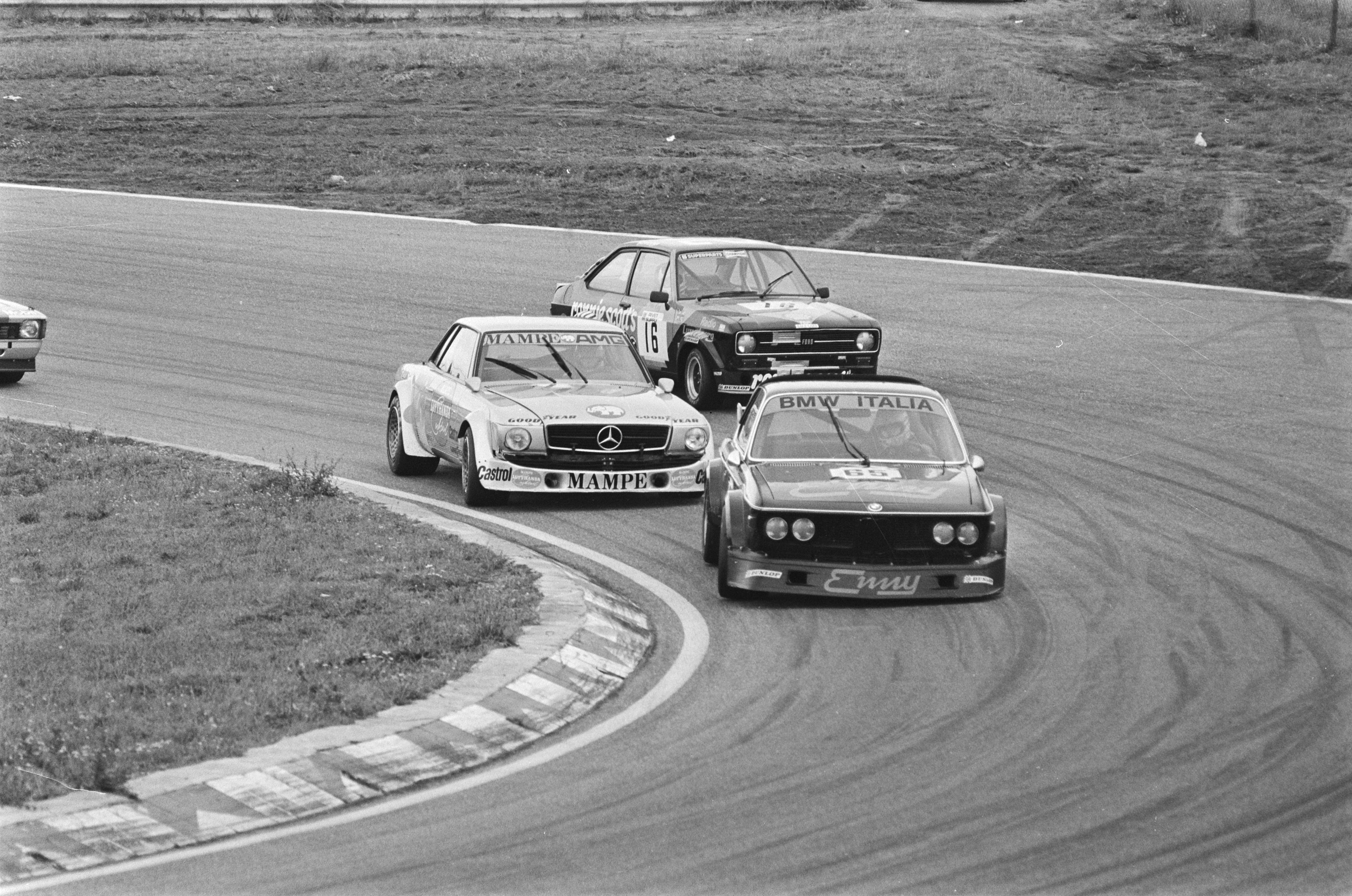
Zandvoort ETCC 1978- Luigi/BMW Italia BMW 3.0 CSL - Umberto Grano, I Toine Hezemans, NL

The European Touring Car Challenge, as it was originally known, was created in 1963 by Willy Stenger at the behest of the FIA. Cars competed under FIA Group 2 Improved Touring Car regulations which allowed a variety of touring cars of different sizes and engine displacements to race together, from the small Fiat 600 and Mini to the large Jaguar Mark 2 and Mercedes-Benz 300SE In 1963 races and hillclimbing events at Nürburgring, Mont Ventoux, Brands Hatch, Mallory Park, Zolder, Zandvoort, Timmelsjoch and even in the Népliget (People's Park) in Budapest counted towards the ETCC, which was won by German Peter Nöcker and his Jaguar. In 1968, the regulations were changed to allow Group 5 cars to participate, however these highly modified Special Touring Cars would only be eligible for two years.

In 1970 the series name was changed from European Touring Car Challenge to European Touring Car Championship. Group 2 again became the principal category, although Group 2 regulations were now much more liberal in nature than the old Group 2.

Following the 1973 oil crisis the next two seasons had few entrants. It was only in 1977 that the situation was normalised with the return of factory teams. Rules allowed Group 2 and Group 1B "National" cars to compete together, with BMW 3.0 Coupé CSL and Capri RS remaining the most competitive entries.

In 1982, the FIA replaced Groups 1 and 2 with Group N and Group A. The first one was mainly ignored by the ETCC entrants, all cars going the Group A route. BMW and Alfa Romeo prepared regular touring cars for the championship, but it was the big-engined Tom Walkinshaw Racing prepared Jaguar XJS and Rover 3500 Vitesse that would be more competitive in the years to come, fighting against the BMW 635 CSi, the turbocharged Volvo 240T and Ford Sierra Cosworth as well as (from 1986) Australian manufacturer Holden and its V8 powered Commodore.

The championship was cancelled after the end of the 1988 season, due to escalating costs (a one-off World Touring Car Championship in 1987 also exacerbated the problem). By then, the FIA had allowed "Evolution" models to be homologated, and it was special cars such as the BMW M3 Evo and Ford Sierra RS500 that dominated the grids and results.

The Macau Guia Race, the Spa 24 Hours and the 24 Hours Nürburgring were the only international touring car races during those years. With the success and popularity of Supertouring in many national championships, the FIA organised the one-round Super Touring World Cup for these cars, between 1993 and 1995. In 1996, the FIA promoted the DTM, which already had races outside Germany in its calendar, to International Touringcar Championship (ITC), but once more escalating costs ended the series after two seasons.

=== European Touring Car Championship (2000–2004) ===
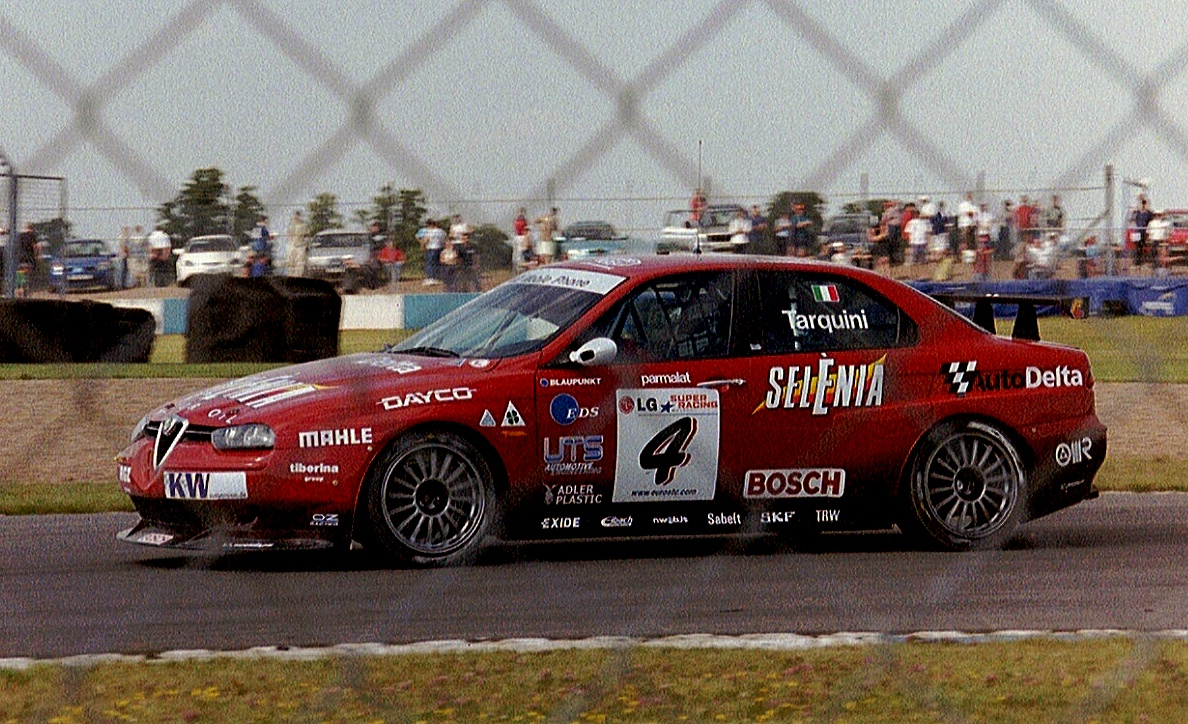
Gabriele Tarquini Alfa Romeo 156 GTA ETCC 2003 Donington

In 2000, the Italian Superturismo Championship was promoted to Euro STC. The series was made up mostly of Italian drivers from the former Italian Campeonato Superturismo and teams plus some other coming from the German Super Tourenwagen Cup. In the first season of Euro STC, six rounds were in Italy while the other four were in Austria, (A1 Ring), Hungary (Hungaroring), Czech Republic (Brno) and Slovenia (Ljubljana). The series was very balanced with four drivers winning five races apiece (Giovanardi, Kox, Morbidelli and Colciago) with four manufacturers (Alfa Romeo, Honda, BMW, Audi). At the end of the year Giovanardi was able to win the title beating Kox in last round.

In 2001, this series became the FIA 2001 European Super Touring Championship, with an extra class for Super Production cars alongside the main Super Touring class. As the former year featured the battle between Alfa drivers' Giovanardi and Larini and Honda driver Tarquini. Tarquini won 9 of 20 races, compared with the 3 victories each by Giovanardi and Larini, but lost the title to Giovanardi due to several retirements that he had during the season.

In 2002, due to high costs FIA decided to let Super Touring make way for the new class Super 2000 and named the new series FIA ETCC, using Super 2000 rules. This new category provoked much interest and saw participation from Alfa Romeo 156 GTA and BMW 320i, Volvo S60 and SEAT Toledo Cupra. Alfa Romeo won the first two championships with Fabrizio Giovanardi and Gabriele Tarquini while in the last season the title was won by Andy Priaulx and his BMW. The series became popular with the public due to the intense competition and Eurosport live broadcasts. For this reason in 2005, the ETCC was promoted to WTCC status.

=== European Touring Car Cup (2005–2017) ===
The European Touring Car title was given from 2005 until 2009 to a once a year European Touring Car Cup, with the best representatives from national championships running to Super 2000, Super Production and Super 1600 regulations in the Baltic States, Denmark, Finland, Germany, Italy, Portugal, Russia, Sweden and the United Kingdom.

Starting in 2010 the ETCC will once again become a multi event racing series. Four events of two races each are set to be held in Portugal, Italy, Austria and Germany at the Circuito Vasco Sameiro in Braga, the Autodromo Bonara in Franciacorta, the Salzburgring in Salzburg and the Motorsport Arena Oschersleben in Oschersleben, respectively. However, on 25 Mar 2010, fiawtcc.com reported that the event in Germany was cancelled to avoid clashes with the German touring car series.

== Champions ==
=== ETCC (1963–1988) ===
Year	Drivers	Manufacturers
1963	(Germany) Peter Nöcker (Jaguar Mk II)	-
1964	(United Kingdom) Warwick Banks (BMC Mini Cooper S)	-
1965	Div.3 (Belgium) Jacky Ickx (Ford Mustang); Div.2 (United Kingdom) John Whitmore (Ford Lotus Cortina); Div.1 (Netherlands) Ed Swart (Abarth 1000 TC)	Div.3: Ford; Div.2: Ford; Div.1: Abarth
1966	Div.3 (Germany) Hubert Hahne (BMW 2000TI); Div.2 (Italy) Andrea de Adamich (Alfa Romeo 1600 GTA); Div.1 (Italy) Giancarlo Baghetti (Abarth 1000 TC)	Div.3: BMW; Div.2: Alfa Romeo; Div.1: Abarth
1967	Div.3 (Germany) Karl von Wendt (Porsche 911); Div.2 (Italy) Andrea de Adamich (Alfa Romeo 1600 GTA); Div.1 (Germany) Willi Kauhsen (Abarth 1000 TC)	Div.3: Porsche; Div.2: Alfa Romeo; Div.1: Abarth
1968	Div.3 (Austria) Dieter Quester (BMW 2002); Div.2 (United Kingdom) John Rhodes (Morris Mini Cooper S); Div.1 (United Kingdom) John Handley (Morris Mini Cooper S)	Div.3: BMW; Div.2: BMC; Div.1: BMC
1969	Div.3 (Austria) Dieter Quester (BMW 2002); Div.2 (Italy) Spartaco Dini (Alfa Romeo 1600 GTA); Div.1 (Italy) Marsilio Pasotti (Abarth 1000 TC)	Div.3: BMW; Div.2: Alfa Romeo; Div.1: Abarth
1970	(Netherlands) Toine Hezemans (Alfa Romeo 2000 GTAm)	Div.3: Alfa Romeo; Div.2: BMW; Div.1: Abarth
1971	(Germany) Dieter Glemser (Ford Capri RS2600)	Div.3: Ford; Div.2: Ford; Div.1: Alfa Romeo
1972	(Germany) Jochen Mass (Ford Capri RS2600)	Div.3: Ford; Div.2: Ford; Div.1: Alfa Romeo
1973	(Netherlands) Toine Hezemans (BMW 3.0 CSL)	BMW
1974	(Germany) Hans Heyer (Ford Escort RS1600)	Ford
1975	(Germany) Siegfried Müller Sr. (BMW 3.0 CSL) (Belgium) Alain Peltier (BMW 3.0 CSL)	Div.2: BMW; Div.1: Ford
1976	(Belgium) Jean Xhenceval (BMW 3.0 CSL) (Belgium) Pierre Dieudonné (BMW 3.0 CSL)	Div.4: BMW; Div.3: Opel; Div.2: Alfa Romeo; Div.1: Alfa Romeo
1977	(Austria) Dieter Quester (BMW 3.0 CSL)	Div.5: BMW; Div.4: BMW; Div.3: BMW; Div.2:Volkswagen; Div.1: Alfa Romeo
1978	(Italy) Umberto Grano (BMW 3.0 CSL)	Div.5: BMW; Div.4: BMW; Div.3: BMW; Div.2:Volkswagen; Div.1: Alfa Romeo
1979	(Italy) Martino Finotto (BMW 3.0 CSL) (Italy) Carlo Facetti (BMW 3.0 CSL)	Div.5: BMW; Div.4: BMW; Div.3: BMW; Div.2: Audi; Div.1: Alfa Romeo
1980	(Germany) Helmut Kelleners (BMW 320) (Germany) Siegfried Müller Jr. (BMW 320)	Div.2: Audi; Div.1: Škoda
1981	(Italy) Umberto Grano (BMW 635CSi) (Germany) Helmut Kelleners (BMW 635CSi)	Div.2: Audi; Div.1:Škoda
1982	(Italy) Umberto Grano (BMW 528i) (Germany) Helmut Kelleners (BMW 528i)	Div.2: Alfa Romeo; Div.1:Volkswagen
1983	(Austria) Dieter Quester (BMW 635CSi)	Div.2: Alfa Romeo; Div.1:Volkswagen
1984	(United Kingdom) Tom Walkinshaw (Jaguar XJS)	Div.2: Alfa Romeo; Div.1:Volkswagen
1985	(Italy) Gianfranco Brancatelli (Volvo 240 Turbo) (Sweden) Thomas Lindström (Volvo 240 Turbo)	Div.2:Alfa Romeo; Div.1:Volkswagen
1986	(Italy) Roberto Ravaglia (BMW 635CSi)	Div.2:Toyota: Div.1:Toyota
1987	(Germany) Winfried Vogt (BMW M3)	Div.2:BMW; Div.1:Toyota
1988	(Italy) Roberto Ravaglia (BMW M3)	Div.2:Ford; Div.1:Toyota

=== ETCC (2000–2004) ===
Year	Championship		Independents class (Michelin Trophy)		Series name
Year	Drivers	Manufacturers	Drivers	Teams	Series name
2000	(Italy) Fabrizio Giovanardi (Alfa Romeo 156 D2)	(Italy) Alfa Romeo	N/A	N/A	European Super Touring Cup
2001	(Italy) Fabrizio Giovanardi (Supertouring)(Alfa Romeo 156 D2) (Netherlands) Peter Kox (Super Production) (BMW 320i)	(Italy) Alfa Romeo	(Italy) Sandro Sardelli (Nissan Primera Mk3 GT) (Supertouring Amateur) (Germany) Norman Simon (BMW 320i) (Super Production Under 25)	(Netherlands) Carly Motorsport	FIA European Super Touring Championship
2002	(Italy) Fabrizio Giovanardi (Alfa Romeo 156 GTA)	(Italy) Alfa Romeo	(Italy) Fabrizio Giovanardi	N/A	FIA ETCC
2003	(Italy) Gabriele Tarquini (Alfa Romeo 156 GTA)	(Germany) BMW	(Netherlands) Duncan Huisman (BMW 320i)	N/A	FIA ETCC
2004	(United Kingdom) Andy Priaulx (BMW 320i)	(Germany) BMW	(Netherlands) Tom Coronel (BMW 320i)	N/A	FIA ETCC

== Statistics winners ==
=== European Super Touring Cup ===
	Driver	Total
1	(Italy) Roberto Colciago	5
1	(Italy) Gianni Morbidelli	5
1	(Italy) Fabrizio Giovanardi	5
1	(Netherlands) Peter Kox	5

	Manufacturer	Total
1	(Germany) Audi	5
1	(Germany) BMW	5
1	(Italy) Alfa Romeo	5
1	(Japan) Honda	5

	Car	Total
1	Audi A4 Quattro	5
1	BMW 320i	5
1	Alfa Romeo 156 D2	5
1	Honda Accord	5

=== European Super Touring Championship ===
	Driver	Total
1	(Italy) Gabriele Tarquini	9
2	(Italy) Nicola Larini	3
2	(Italy) Fabrizio Giovanardi	3
4	(Italy) Roberto Colciago	2
5	(United Kingdom) Matt Neal	1
5	(France) Yvan Muller	1
5	(France) Fabrice Walfisch	1

	Manufacturer	Total
1	(Japan) Honda	10
2	(Italy) Alfa Romeo	7
3	(Germany) Audi	2
4	(Japan) Nissan	1

	Car	Total
1	Honda Accord	10
2	Alfa Romeo 156 D2	7
3	Audi A4 Quattro	2
4	Nissan Primera GT	1

=== European Touring Car Championship ===
	Driver	Total
1	(Italy) Gabriele Tarquini	12
1	(Germany) Jörg Müller	12
3	(Italy) Fabrizio Giovanardi	10
4	(United Kingdom) Andy Priaulx	8
4	(Germany) Dirk Müller	8
6	(Italy) Nicola Larini	5
7	(United Kingdom) James Thompson	2
7	(Italy) Roberto Colciago	2
9	(Sweden) Rickard Rydell	1

	Manufacturer	Total
1	(Italy) Alfa Romeo	31
2	(Germany) BMW	28
3	(Spain) SEAT	1

	Car	Total
1	BMW 320i	28
2	Alfa Romeo 156 GTA	23
3	Alfa Romeo 156	8
4	SEAT Toledo Cupra	1

== Bibliography ==
- Harold Schwarz (27 May 2021). European Touring Car Championship 1970–1975. Sportfahrer Verlag. ISBN 978-3945390122.
