= Riddel =

Riddel may refer to:

- Riddels, or riddel curtains, posts, rails etc, curtains at the sides of a church altar.
- Peter Riddel (died 1641), English politician
- Eliza and Isabella Riddel, who endowed Riddel Hall to Queen's University Belfast in 1913
- Riddel (Chrono Cross), a fictional character

== See also ==
- Ridel, surname
- Ridell, surname
- Riddell (disambiguation)
- Riddle (disambiguation)
