= Riddell (surname) =

Riddell as a surname may refer to:

- Riddell baronets
- Henry Scott Riddell (1798–1870), Scottish poet and songwriter
- Archibald Riddell (minister), 17th-century Presbyterian minister in Scotland and America
- Archibald Riddell (politician) (1864–1945), Canadian farmer and politician
- Alastair Riddell (born 1952), glam rock musician from New Zealand
- Arthur George Riddell (1836–1907), Roman Catholic Bishop of Northampton
- Campbell Drummond Riddell (1796–1858), Australian Colonial public servant
- Carol Anne Riddell, education reporter and co-anchor for WNBC-TV news
- Charlotte Riddell (1832–1906), writer of the Victorian period
- Chris Riddell (born 1962), British illustrator, cartoonist and writer of children's books
- Clay Riddell (1937–2018), Canadian billionaire, founder and CEO of Paramount Resources
- Derek Riddell (born 1967), Scottish television actor
- Don Riddell (born 1972), English news anchor and sports journalist
- Elizabeth Riddell (1910–1998), Australian poet and journalist
- Gary Riddell (1966–1989), Scottish footballer
- George Riddell, 1st Baron Riddell (1865–1934), British solicitor, newspaper proprietor
- George W. Riddell (fl. 1900s), Pinkerton labor spy
- Hannah Riddell (1855–1932), English woman founded Hansen's disease hospital in Japan
- Harriet Riddell (born 1990), British artist
- Jack Riddell (1931–2024), Canadian politician
- James Riddell (disambiguation), multiple people
- Jim Riddell (1930–2012), New Zealand rugby player
- John Riddell (disambiguation), multiple people
- Mark Riddell (born 1981), Australian rugby player
- Mike Riddell (born 1953), New Zealand writer
- Neil Riddell (born 1947), English cricketer
- Norman Riddell (1887–1918), English footballer
- Peter Riddell (born 1948), British journalist and author
- Rachel Riddell (born 1984), Canadian water polo player
- Ray Riddell (born 1919), Australian football player
- Richard Riddell (fl. 1970s– ), American lighting designer
- Robert Riddell (1755–1794), Laird of Friar's Carse, friend of Robert Burns
- Rosemary Riddell (fl. 1970s– ), New Zealand actor, film director and judge
- Victor Riddell (1905–1976), English cricketer
- Walter Alexander Riddell (1881–1963), Canadian civil servant and diplomat
- William Riddell (1807–1847), Roman Catholic bishop
- William Glendinning Riddell (1865–1957), magistrate in New Zealand
- W. J. B. Riddell aka Brownlow Riddell (1899–1976), Scottish ophthalmologist
- William Renwick Riddell (1852–1945), Canadian lawyer, judge, and historian

== See also ==
- Ridell, surname
