= William Riddell (disambiguation) =

William Riddell (1807–1847) was a Roman Catholic bishop.

William Riddell may also refer to:

- James Riddell (skier) (born William James Riddell; 1909–2000), British skier and author
- W. G. Riddell (1865–1957), New Zealand magistrate
- W. J. B. Riddell (1899–1976), Scottish ophthalmologist
- William Renwick Riddell (1852–1945), Canadian lawyer, judge, and historian

== See also ==
- William Riedell (1904–1952), American naval officer, engineer, and sports shooter
- William Biddell (1825–1900), British politician
