= James Thompson (racing driver) =

British racing driver (born 1974)

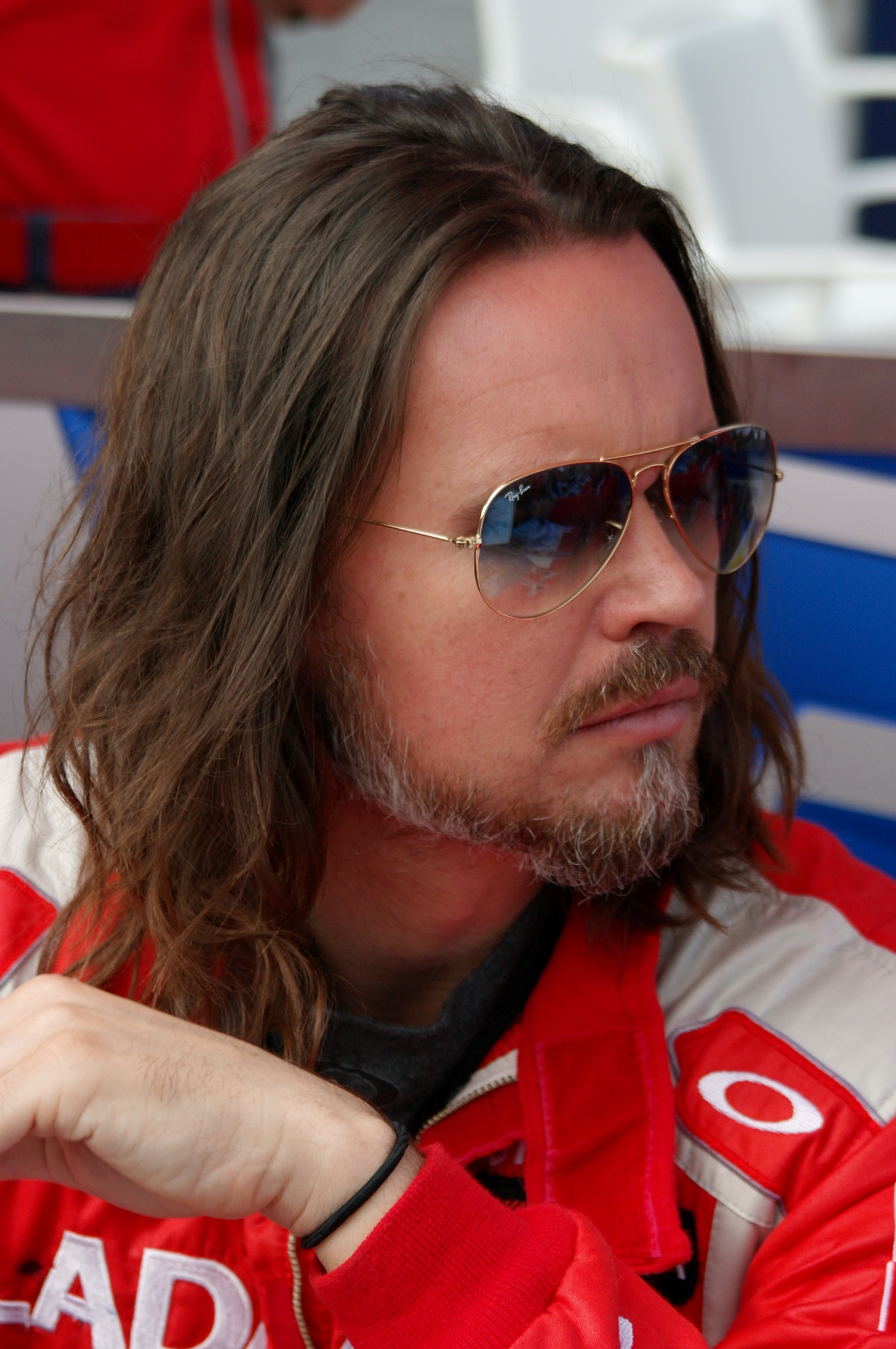
- Thompson at the 2014 FIA WTCC Race of Belgium.
- Nationality: (United Kingdom) British
- Born: Edward James Thompson; 26 April 1974 (age 52) York, North Yorkshire, England

World Touring Car Championship career
- Debut season: 2005
- Current team: ALL-INKL.COM Münnich Motorsport
- Car number: 15
- Former teams: Lada Sport Rosneft; N. Technology; SEAT Sport; Squadra Corse Alfa Romeo
- Starts: 156
- Wins: 4
- Poles: 2
- Fastest laps: 7
- Best finish: 3rd in 2007

Previous series
- 2011 2010–11 2009, 2011 2009–10 2009 2008–10 2001, 2003–04 2000 1998 1997 1994–2004, 2006 1992: Lada Granta Cup; Scandinavian Touring Car Championship; British Touring Car Championship; European Touring Car Cup; V8 Supercars; Danish Touringcar Championship; European Touring Car Championship; Deutsche Tourenwagen Masters; Belgian Procar; Super Tourenwagen Cup; British Touring Car Championship; Formula Vauxhall Junior

Championship titles
- 2010 2009 2004 2002: European Touring Car Cup; European Touring Car Cup; British Touring Car Championship; British Touring Car Championship

Edward James Thompson (born 26 April 1974 in York, England) is a British auto racing driver. He has twice been champion of the British Touring Car Championship (BTCC) and the European Touring Car Cup, and was third in the 2007 World Touring Car Championship.

== Racing career ==
=== British Touring Car Championship ===
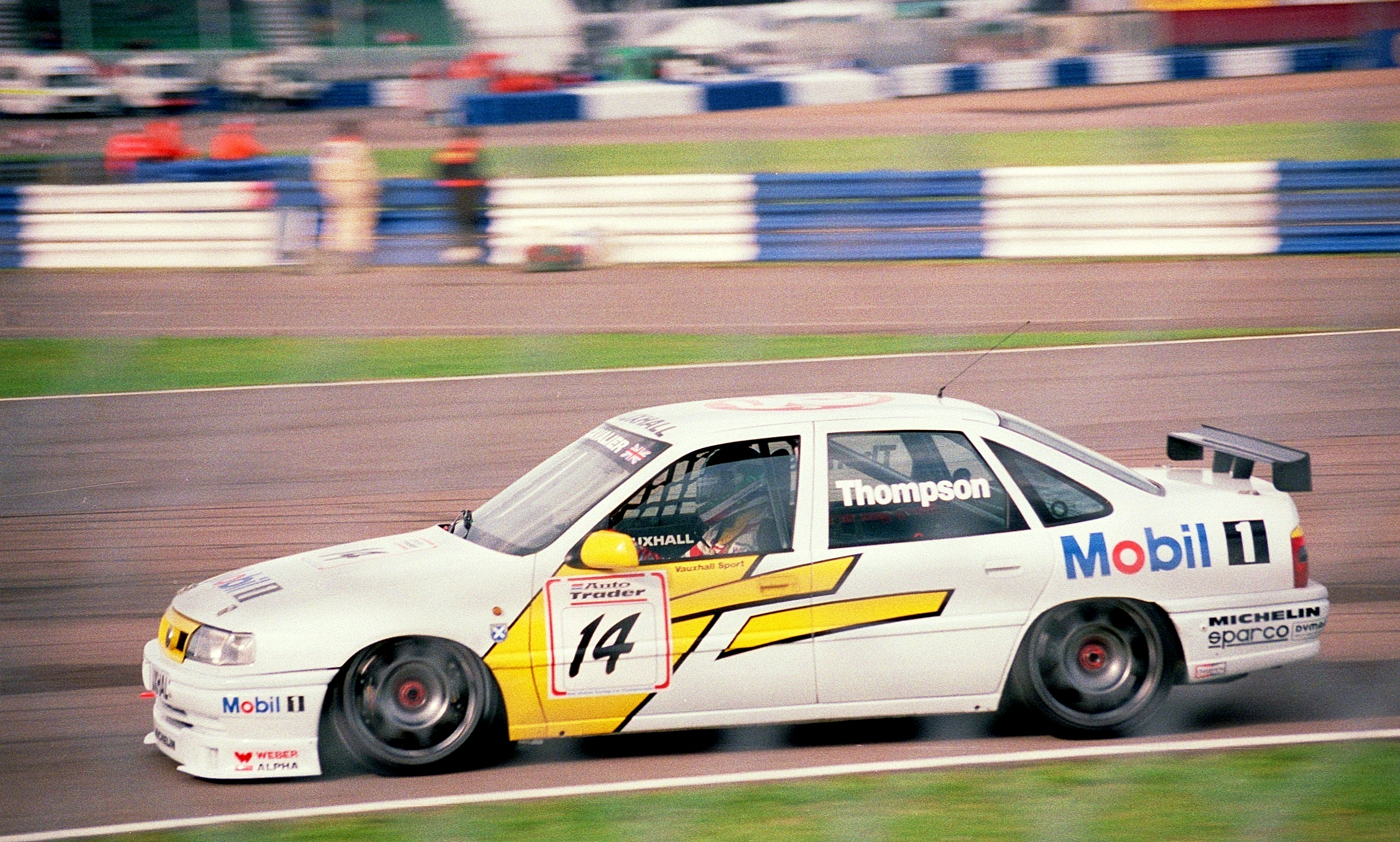
Thompson driving for Vauxhall at Silverstone during the 1995 British Touring Car Championship season.

Thompson started racing in the BTCC in a privately entered Peugeot 405 in 1994, his performances earning him a factory Vauxhall drive for 1995. He became the youngest ever race-winner that year, also taking two pole positions, before his season was cut short by a crash at Knockhill giving him an eye injury. 1996 was a transitional year with the new Vauxhall Vectra, although Thompson took a victory at Snetterton, moving up from fifth in a two-lap burst in which Roberto Ravaglia and Rickard Rydell collided, Joachim Winkelhock spun, and Alain Menu broke down.

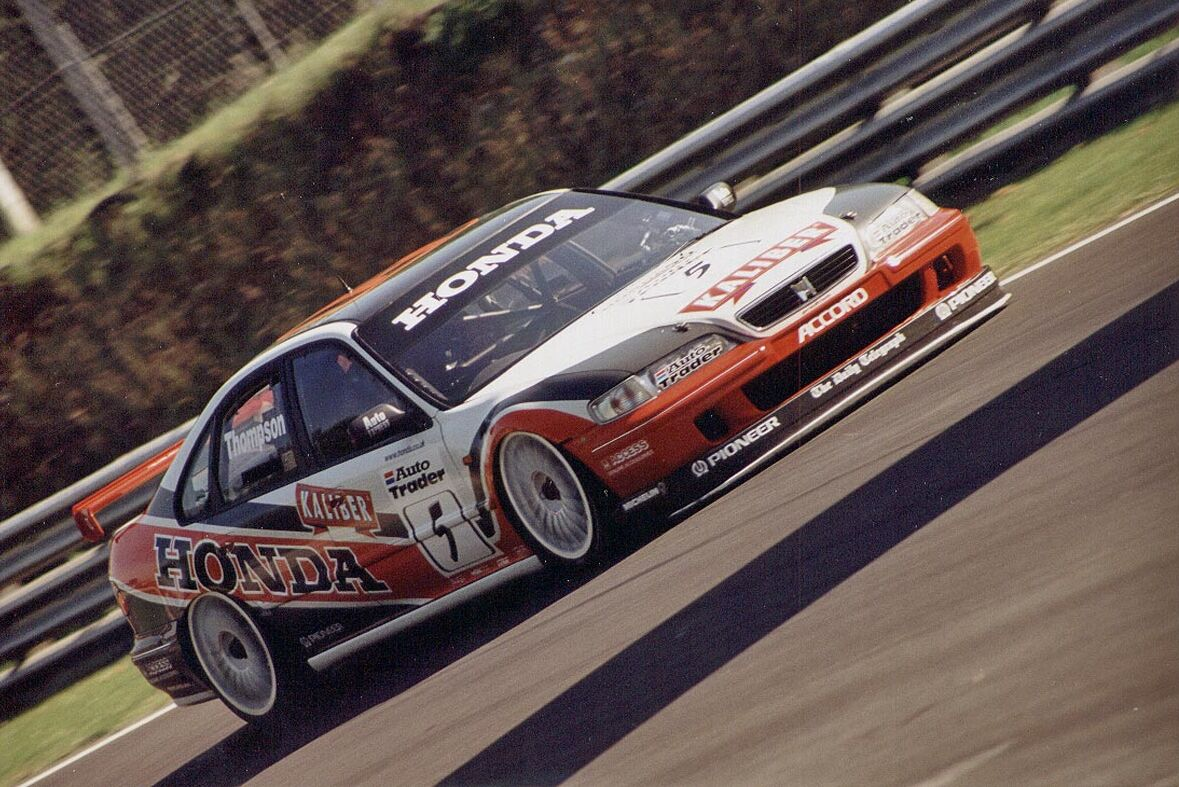
Thompson driving for Honda in the 1998 British Touring Car Championship.

In 1997, Thompson joined Honda, finishing fifth in the championship in 1997, third in 1998, and fourth in 1999. He missed two rounds through a concussion sustained in a 12G backwards accident at Brands Hatch in 2000, but returned to racing at Knockhill, and was able to finish ninth, having been pre-season favourite for the title.

Thompson racing at Donington Park in the 2004 BTCC season

When Honda pulled out for 2001, Thompson joined Team Egg Sport, racing their Vauxhall to four wins and third overall – enough to earn him a return to the factory Vauxhall team for 2002, which featured a titanic three-year battle with team-mate Yvan Muller in their dominant Astra. Thompson was BTCC champion in both 2002 and 2004, and was second in 2003 behind Muller.

For 2006, Thompson joined Jason Plato at SEAT Sport UK. He did this at the same time as competing in the WTCC, meaning he had to skip some BTCC rounds when they clashed with World touring car races, in the second SEAT Sport UK car, though at Silverstone for the final round he used his Red Bull-backed WTCC car. After competing in the first nine races, he was actually ahead of BTCC team leader Plato. Despite having to yield the victory to Plato at Croft, he finished sixth overall, scoring more points per entry than any other SEAT driver; although Plato failed to start two races due to accident damage.

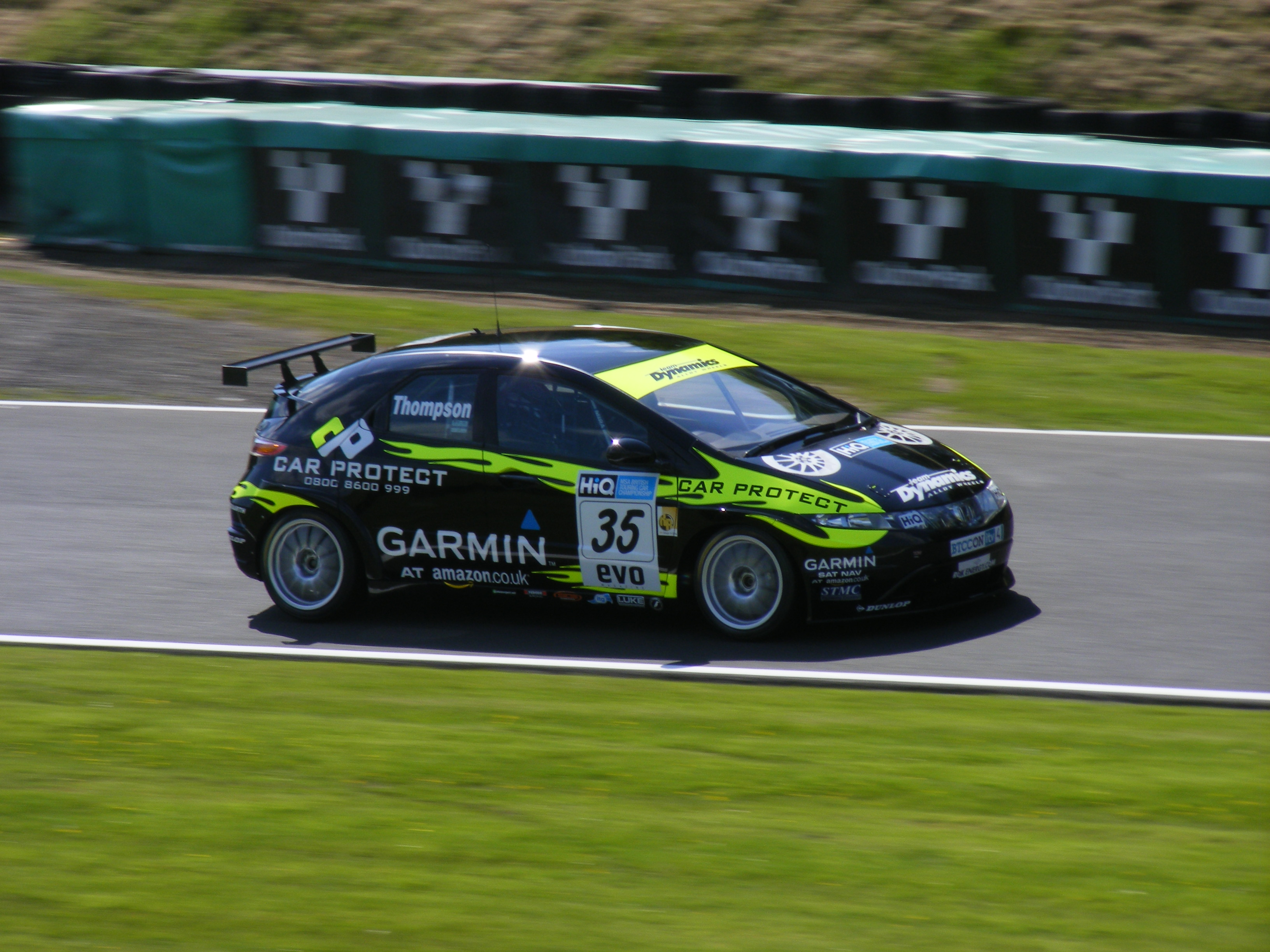
Thompson competing in the fourth event of the 2009 British Touring Car Championship season at Oulton Park.

For 2009, rumours had placed Thompson with a possible return to the BTCC after discussions with Team Dynamics to race one of their Honda Civics. He also tested a Tempus Sport Chevrolet Lacetti and a Motorbase Performance BMW 320si. However, his name was missing from the pre-season entry list, and it was later announced he would spend another year in the Danish series. It was then announced in April, prior to the Thruxton round that he would return to the BTCC, replacing Gordon Shedden. He collected a double win at Donington Park, and added a third win at Oulton Park. After the round at Knockhill, Thompson was replaced by ex-Formula One driver Johnny Herbert due to clashes with his commitments in the WTCC and V8 Supercars.

Thompson was chosen as the development driver for the new Next Generation Touring Car regulations, and participated in first practice for the 2010 season finale at Brands Hatch in a prototype car based on a Toyota Avensis.

Thompson returned to racing for the 2011 season finale with Airwaves Racing to support Mat Jackson's title bid. The weekend did not go well with two retirements in the first two races, but a single point for fastest lap in the last race was to be the best result of the weekend.

=== World Touring Car Championship ===
For 2005, Thompson attempted a new challenge in the World Touring Car Championship, with Alfa Romeo. His first WTCC season opened with a win, but was not a huge success overall. He finished the season eighth in the standings. Alfa Romeo pulled out of the WTCC at the end of the season, leaving Thompson's future uncertain.

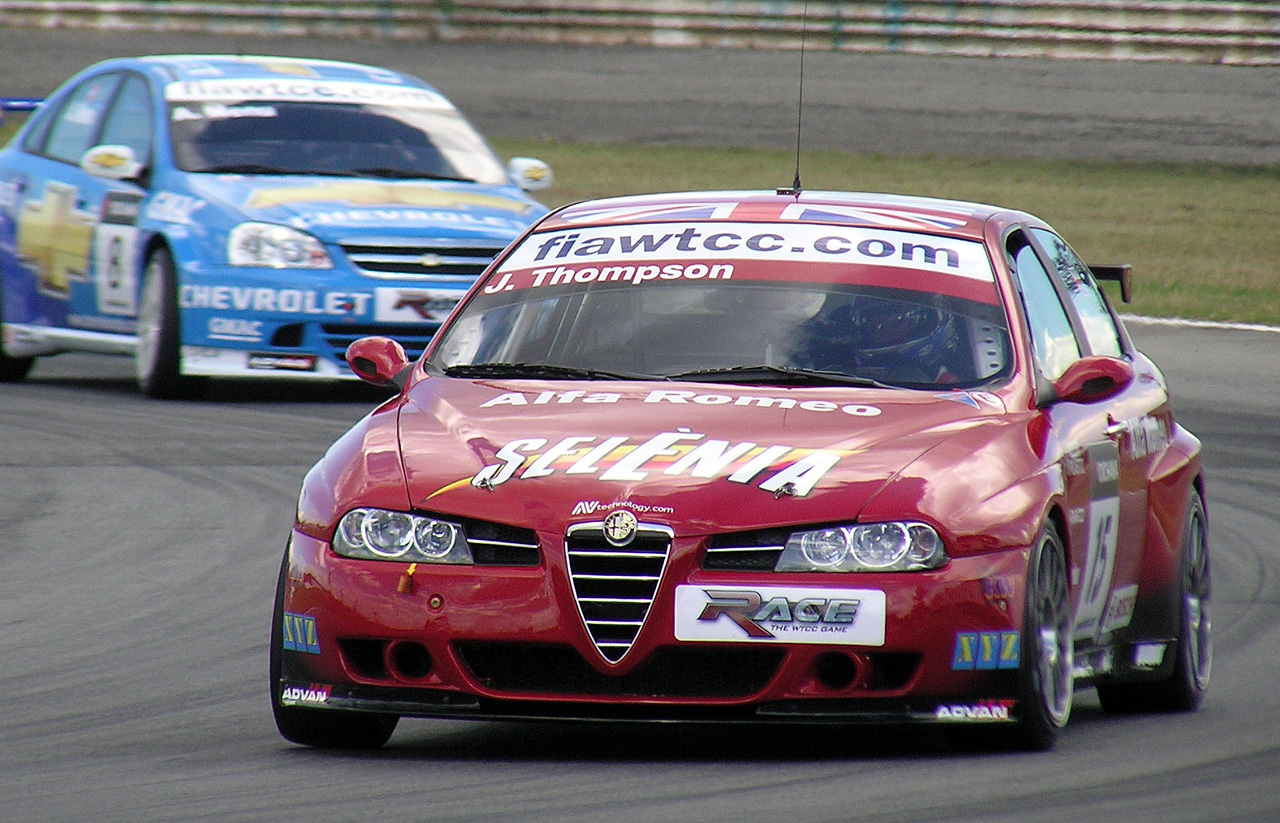
Thompson driving the Alfa Romeo 156 WTCC car in 2007.

For 2006 he moved to SEAT Sport, the team which he would also drive for in that year's BTCC. Within the first six races, Thompson finished on the podium three times but in the second half of the season he finished in the points on only three occasions. In a team that featured a top driver lineup including Yvan Muller and Gabriele Tarquini, he finished eighth in the Drivers Championship.

In 2007, Thompson rejoined Alfa Romeo in the WTCC run by N.Technology. Although his aged Alfa Romeo 156 was not as well developed as his works-backed rivals, he fought for the championship title until the final race and ended the season in third place.

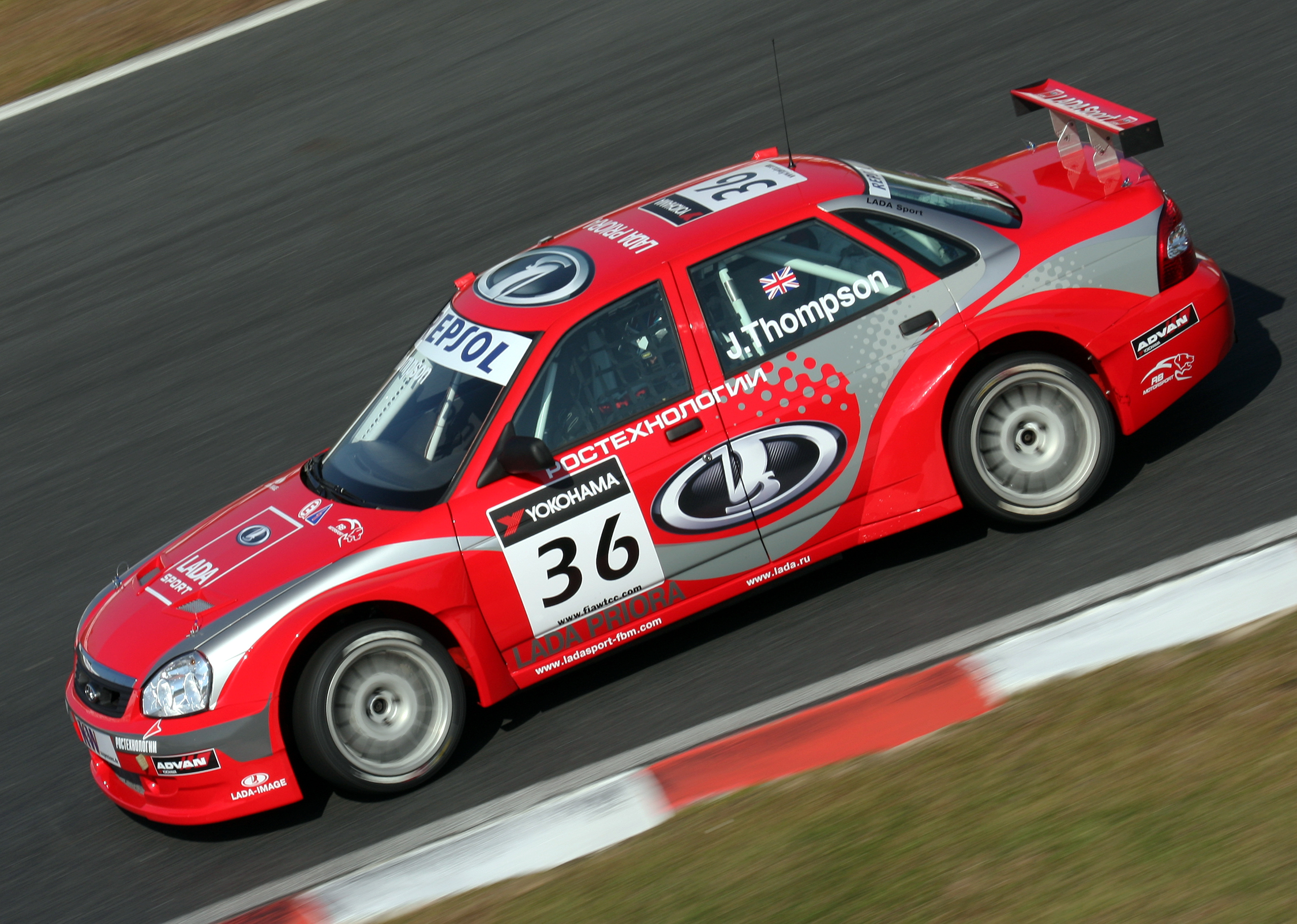
Thompson competing in the 2009 World Touring Car Championship.

In 2008, Thompson competed for N.Technology in a Honda Accord Euro R in the WTCC. He also drove an Accord in the Danish Touring Car Championship. After missing the first two WTCC meetings, the team struggled to develop the car competitively. However, the team steadily worked on the car over the season and scored their first win of the season at Imola. However, N.Technology announced its withdrawal at the end of the year, leaving Thompson without a drive.

Thompson also returned to the WTCC with Lada Sport in July 2009, driving their new Priora model. He participated in five events with Lada Sport, achieving a best result of sixth place in both races at Imola. Thompson was unable to participate in the final event at Macau following a heavy collision in qualifying with the stationary car of Stefano D'Aste.

Thompson returned to the WTCC in 2012 with Lada Sport driving a Lada Granta WTCC at both the Race of Hungary and the Race of Portugal.

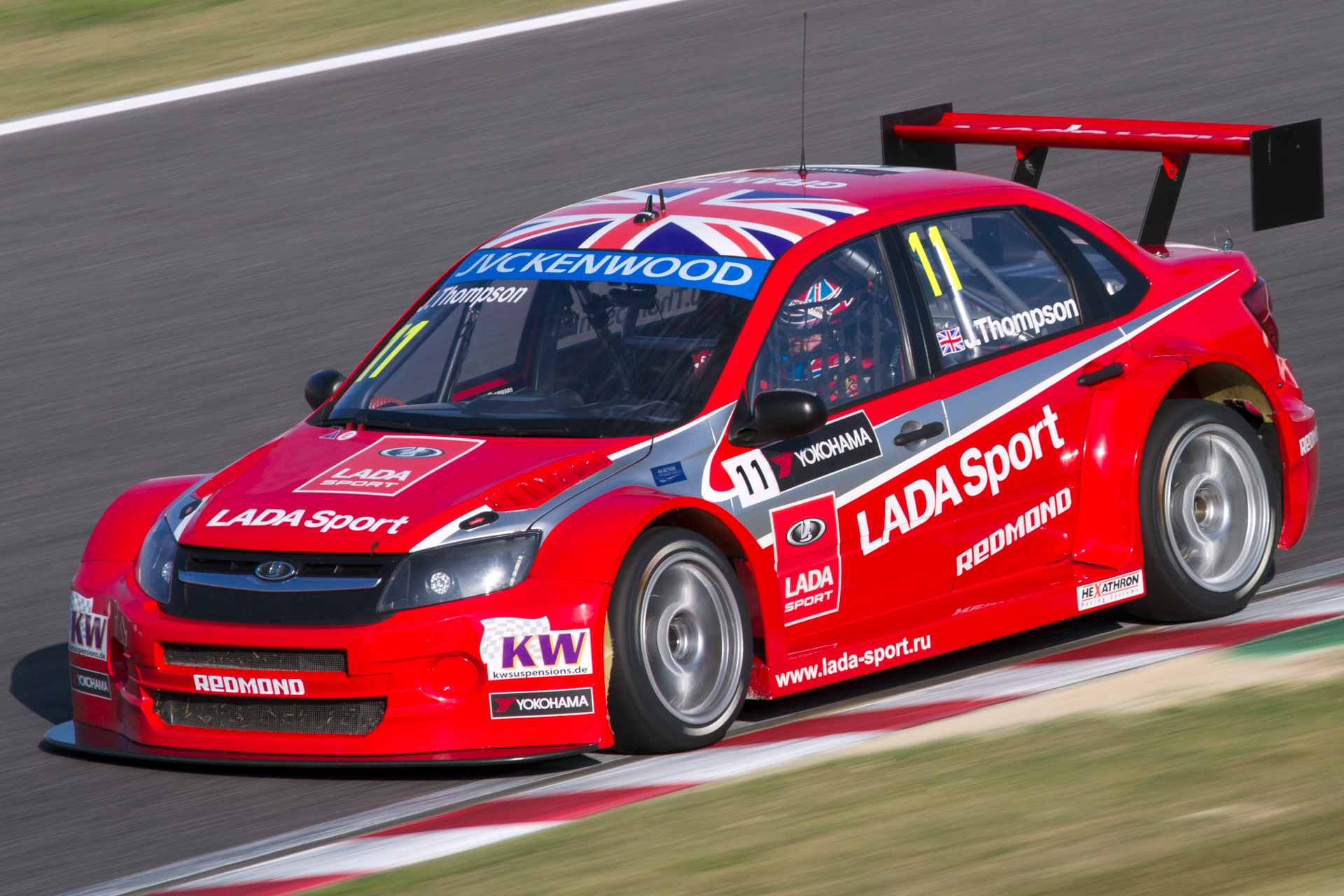
Thompson competing in the 2014 World Touring Car Championship.

Thompson would return to the WTCC in 2013, driving a Lada Granta WTCC full-time with Lada Sport Lukoil alongside new teammate Aleksei Dudukalo. During qualifying for the Race of Italy, he was hit by Dudukalo who had missed the braking point for the first chicane. Thompson was already through to Q2 and he returned to the pits for repairs before taking part in the second session. He set the ninth fastest time which would give him a front row start when the grid was reversed for race two. Lada later withdrew both of their cars prior to the races as neither could be repaired in time to participate.

=== European Touring Car Cup ===
Thompson won the 2009 European Touring Car Cup at the Circuito Vasco Sameiro near Braga in Portugal, driving a Honda Accord for Hartmann Honda Racing.

In 2010, Thompson revealed a schedule of ETCC, the new-for-2010 Scandinavian Touring Car Cup and DTC, Danish Touring Car Championship. He won the season opener of ETCC and led the championship, but a few days before the Scandinavian season kicked off, he parted ways with Danish team Hartmann Honda Racing. The two got back together heading for the second round of ETCC. Thompson successfully defended his ETCC title in 2010.

=== Scandinavian Touring Car Championship ===
In 2011, Thompson raced in the Scandinavian Touring Car Championship for Polestar Racing in their Volvo C30. He left the team in the middle of season, citing differences in the development direction of the car as the reason for the departure. His replacement was later announced at WTCC driver Gabriele Tarquini.

== Race of Champions ==
After Jenson Button pulled out of the 2006 Race of Champions, Thompson was announced as his replacement on 13 December 2006. He competed for the British team with fellow touring car driver Andy Priaulx on 16 December 2006.

== Racing record ==
=== Complete British Touring Car Championship results ===
(key) Races in bold indicate pole position (1 point awarded – 1996–2002 all races, 2003–present just for first race) Races in italics indicate fastest lap (1 point awarded – 2001–present all races) * signifies that driver lead race for at least one lap (1 point awarded – 1998–2002 just for feature race, 2003–present all races)

Year	Team	Car	Class	1	2	3	4	5	6	7	8	9	10	11	12	13	14	15	16	17	18	19	20	21	22	23	24	25	26	27	28	29	30	Pen.	Pos	Pts
1994	Woodkirk Peugeot	Peugeot 405 Mi16		THR; 1 Ret	BRH; 1; 16	BRH; 2; 18	SNE; 1 Ret	SIL; 1; 21	SIL; 2 DNS	OUL; 1	DON; 1	DON; 2	BRH; 1; 18	BRH; 2; 15	SIL; 1; 10	KNO; 1 Ret	KNO; 2 DNS	OUL; 1 Ret	BRH; 1; 20	BRH; 2 Ret	SIL; 1; 18	SIL; 2 Ret	DON; 1; 16	DON; 2; 19											24th	1
1995	Vauxhall Sport	Vauxhall Cavalier 16v		DON; 1; 7	DON; 2; 7	BRH; 1 Ret	BRH; 2; 2	THR; 1 Ret	**THR**; **2**; 1	SIL; 1; 4	SIL; 2 Ret	**OUL**; **1**; 6	OUL; 2; 4	BRH; 1 Ret	BRH; 2; 2	DON; 1; 4	DON; 2; 5	SIL; 1; 3	KNO; 1	KNO; 2	BRH; 1	BRH; 2	SNE; 1	SNE; 2	OUL; 1	OUL; 2	SIL; 1	SIL; 2							7th	124
1996	Vauxhall Sport	Vauxhall Vectra		DON; 1; 10	DON; 2 Ret	BRH; 1 Ret	BRH; 2; 7	THR; 1; 7	THR; 2; 6	SIL; 1; 6	SIL; 2; 6	OUL; 1; 17	OUL; 2 Ret	SNE; 1; 1	SNE; 2; 4	BRH; 1; 7	BRH; 2; 5	SIL; 1; 8	SIL; 2; 7	KNO; 1 Ret	KNO; 2 Ret	OUL; 1 Ret	OUL; 2; 6	THR; 1 Ret	THR; 2; 2	DON; 1 Ret	DON; 2; 9	BRH; 1 DNS	BRH; 2 DNS						10th	83
1997	Team Honda Sport	Honda Accord		DON; 1 Ret	DON; 2; 6	SIL; 1 Ret	SIL; 2; 9	THR; 1; 6	THR; 2 Ret	BRH; 1; 2	BRH; 2; 1	OUL; 1 Ret	OUL; 2; 2	DON; 1; 6	DON; 2; 11	CRO; 1; 5	CRO; 2; 2	KNO; 1; 6	KNO; 2 Ret	SNE; 1; 2	SNE; 2; 4	THR; 1; 3	**THR**; **2**; 3	BRH; 1 Ret	BRH; 2 Ret	SIL; 1; 7	SIL; 2; 4								5th	132
1998	Team Honda Sport	Honda Accord		THR; 1; 3	THR; 2; 3	**SIL**; **1**; 2	SIL; 2; 9*	DON; 1; 2	DON; 2; 4	BRH; 1; 9	BRH; 2; 2	OUL; 1 Ret	OUL; 2; 5	DON; 1 Ret	DON; 2 Ret	**CRO**; **1**; 1	CRO; 2; 5	SNE; 1; 4	SNE; 2; 1*	THR; 1; 4	THR; 2; 5*	KNO; 1; 2	KNO; 2 Ret	BRH; 1; 2	BRH; 2; 9*	OUL; 1; 1	OUL; 2 Ret	SIL; 1; 1	SIL; 2; 4*						**3rd**	**203**
1999	Team Honda Sport	Honda Accord		**DON**; **1**; 1	DON; 2; 2*	SIL; 1; 5	SIL; 2; 4	THR; 1; 5	THR; 2; 8	BRH; 1; 7	BRH; 2; 6*	OUL; 1; 11	OUL; 2 Ret	**DON**; **1**; 1	DON; 2; 3	**CRO**; **1**; 1	**CRO**; **2**; 2*	SNE; 1; 9	SNE; 2; 15	THR; 1; 7	THR; 2 Ret	KNO; 1; 14	KNO; 2 Ret	BRH; 1; 3	BRH; 2; 3	OUL; 1 DSQ	OUL; 2; 1*	SIL; 1; 2	SIL; 2; 9						4th	174
2000	Redstone Team Honda	Honda Accord	S	BRH; 1 ovr:6 cls:6	BRH; 2 Ret	DON; 1	DON; 2	THR; 1	THR; 2	KNO; 1 ovr:6 cls:6	KNO; 2 DSQ	OUL; 1 ovr:4 cls:4	OUL; 2 ovr:4 cls:4	SIL; 1 ovr:1 cls:1	SIL; 2 ovr:4 cls:4	CRO; 1 ovr:7 cls:7	CRO; 2 ovr:4 cls:4	SNE; 1 Ret	SNE; 2 ovr:3* cls:3	DON; 1 ovr:3 cls:3	DON; 2 ovr:5* cls:5	BRH; 1 ovr:6 cls:6	BRH; 2 ovr:5* cls:5	OUL; 1 ovr:4 cls:4	OUL; 2 ovr:5 cls:5	SIL; 1 ovr:3 cls:3	SIL; 2 ovr:8* cls:8								9th	129
2001	egg:sport	Vauxhall Astra Coupé	T	BRH; 1; 3†	BRH; 2 ovr:1* cls:1	THR; 1 ovr:3 cls:3	**THR**; **2** ovr:4 cls:4	OUL; 1 ovr:8 cls:2	OUL; 2 ovr:2 cls:2	SIL; 1 ovr:5 cls:3	SIL; 2 ovr:4 cls:4	MON; 1 ovr:3 cls:2	MON; 2 ovr:3 cls:3	**DON**; **1** ovr:1 cls:1	**DON**; **2** ovr:2* cls:2	KNO; 1 ovr:7 cls:3	KNO; 2 ovr:3 cls:3	SNE; 1 ovr:6 cls:3	SNE; 2 ovr:1* cls:1	CRO; 1 ovr:5 cls:3	**CRO**; **2** ovr:3* cls:3	OUL; 1 ovr:4 cls:4	OUL; 2 ovr:2 cls:2	SIL; 1 ovr:4 cls:4	SIL; 2 ovr:1* cls:1	DON; 1 Ret	DON; 2 ovr:2 cls:2	BRH; 1 ovr:5 cls:4	BRH; 2 Ret						**3rd**	**276**
2002	Vauxhall Motorsport	Vauxhall Astra Coupé	T	BRH; 1 Ret	BRH; 2 ovr:1* cls:1	OUL; 1 ovr:3 cls:3	OUL; 2 ovr:7* cls:7	THR; 1 ovr:1 cls:1	THR; 2 ovr:2 cls:2	SIL; 1 ovr:8 cls:8	SIL; 2 ovr:1* cls:1	MON; 1 ovr:2 cls:2	**MON**; **2** ovr:2 cls:2	**CRO**; **1** ovr:1 cls:1	**CRO**; **2** Ret	SNE; 1 ovr:1 cls:1	**SNE**; **2** ovr:2 cls:2	KNO; 1 ovr:3 cls:3	KNO; 2 ovr:3 cls:3	BRH; 1 Ret	BRH; 2 Ret	**DON**; **1** ovr:1 cls:1	DON; 2 ovr:3 cls:3											−15	**1st**	**183**
2003	VX Racing	Vauxhall Astra Coupé	T	MON; 1 ovr:1* cls:1	**MON**; **2** ovr:1* cls:1	**BRH**; **1** ovr:5 cls:5	BRH; 2 ovr:2 cls:2	THR; 1 ovr:4 cls:4	THR; 2 ovr:5 cls:5	**SIL**; **1** ovr:1* cls:1	**SIL**; **2** ovr:2 cls:2	ROC; 1 ovr:5 cls:5	ROC; 2 ovr:4 cls:4	**CRO**; **1** ovr:2 cls:2	CRO; 2 ovr:2 cls:2	**SNE**; **1** ovr:2* cls:2	SNE; 2 Ret	BRH; 1 ovr:5 cls:5	BRH; 2 ovr:10 cls:10	**DON**; **1** ovr:2* cls:2	DON; 2 ovr:3 cls:3	**OUL**; **1** ovr:1* cls:1	**OUL**; **2** Ret*												**2nd**	**199**
2004	VX Racing	Vauxhall Astra Coupé		**THR**; **1**; 1*	THR; 2 Ret	THR; 3; 3	BRH; 1; 4	BRH; 2; 2	BRH; 3; 1*	SIL; 1; 4	SIL; 2; 1*	**SIL**; **3**; 7*	**OUL**; **1**; 2	OUL; 2; 5	OUL; 3; 3	MON; 1; 5	MON; 2; 2	MON; 3; 4	CRO; 1; 4	CRO; 2; 4	CRO; 3; 4	KNO; 1; 3	KNO; 2 Ret	KNO; 3; 4	BRH; 1; 3	BRH; 2; 4	BRH; 3; 12*	**SNE**; **1**; 1*	SNE; 2; 7	SNE; 3; 3	DON; 1; 2*	DON; 2; 5	DON; 3; 3		**1st**	**274**
2006	SEAT Sport UK	SEAT León		BRH; 1; 1*	**BRH**; **2**; 1*	BRH; 3; 5	MON; 1; 3	MON; 2 Ret	MON; 3; 4	OUL; 1; 11	OUL; 2; 4	OUL; 3; 2*	THR; 1	THR; 2	THR; 3	**CRO**; **1**; 2*	CRO; 2; 5	CRO; 3; 1*	DON; 1	DON; 2	DON; 3	SNE; 1; 2	SNE; 2; 2	SNE; 3; 2	KNO; 1	KNO; 2	KNO; 3	BRH; 1	BRH; 2	BRH; 3	SIL; 1; 5	SIL; 2 Ret	SIL; 3; 5		6th	162
2009	Team Dynamics	Honda Civic		BRH; 1	BRH; 2	BRH; 3	THR; 1; 11	THR; 2; 7	THR; 3; 3	DON; 1; 1*	**DON**; **2**; 1*	DON; 3; 6	OUL; 1; 8	OUL; 2; 7	**OUL**; **3**; 1*	CRO; 1; 11	CRO; 2; 9	CRO; 3; 2*	SNE; 1 Ret	SNE; 2; 4	SNE; 3; 5	KNO; 1 Ret	KNO; 2; 6	**KNO**; **3**; 6*	SIL; 1	SIL; 2	SIL; 3	ROC; 1	ROC; 2	ROC; 3	BRH; 1	BRH; 2	BRH; 3		9th	114
2011	Airwaves Racing	Ford Focus ST		BRH; 1	BRH; 2	BRH; 3	DON; 1	DON; 2	DON; 3	THR; 1	THR; 2	THR; 3	OUL; 1	OUL; 2	OUL; 3	CRO; 1	CRO; 2	CRO; 3	SNE; 1	SNE; 2	SNE; 3	KNO; 1	KNO; 2	KNO; 3	ROC; 1	ROC; 2	ROC; 3	BRH; 1	BRH; 2	BRH; 3	SIL; 1 Ret	SIL; 2 Ret	SIL; 3; 18		25th	1

† Event with 2 races staged for the different classes.

=== Complete Super Tourenwagen Cup results ===
(key) (Races in bold indicate pole position) (Races in italics indicate fastest lap)

Year	Team	Car	1	2	3	4	5	6	7	8	9	10	11	12	13	14	15	16	17	18	19	20	DC	Pts
1997	Team Honda Sport	Honda Accord	HOC; 1	HOC; 2	ZOL; 1	ZOL; 2	NÜR; 1	NÜR; 2	SAC; 1	SAC; 2	NOR; 1	NOR; 2	WUN; 1	WUN; 2	ZWE; 1	ZWE; 2	SAL; 1	SAL; 2	REG; 1	REG; 2	NÜR; 1; 8	NÜR; 2; 7	27th	41

=== Complete Deutsche Tourenwagen Masters results ===
(key) (Races in bold indicate pole position) (Races in italics indicate fastest lap)

Year	Team	Car	1	2	3	4	5	6	7	8	9	10	11	12	13	14	15	16	17	18	Pos.	Pts
2000	Abt Sportsline	Abt-Audi TT-R	HOC; 1	HOC; 2	OSC; 1; 17	OSC; 2 DNS	NOR; 1	NOR; 2	SAC; 1	SAC; 2	NÜR; 1; 12	NÜR; 2; 16	LAU; 1 C	LAU; 2 C	OSC; 1; 9	OSC; 2 Ret	NÜR; 1; 15	NÜR; 2 Ret	HOC; 1; 13	HOC; 2; 9	18th	4

=== Complete European Touring Car Championship results ===
(key) (Races in bold indicate pole position) (Races in italics indicate fastest lap)

Year	Team	Car	1	2	3	4	5	6	7	8	9	10	11	12	13	14	15	16	17	18	19	20	DC	Pts
2001	JAS Motorsport Italia IP	Honda Accord	MNZ; 1	MNZ; 2	BRN; 1	BRN; 2	MAG; 1	MAG; 2	SIL; 1	SIL; 2	ZOL; 1	ZOL; 2	HUN; 1	HUN; 2	A1R; 1	A1R; 2	NÜR; 1	NÜR; 2	JAR; 1; 2	JAR; 2; 4	EST; 1; 24	**EST**; **2**; 2	20th	107
2003	GTA Racing Team Nordauto	Alfa Romeo 156 GTA	VAL; 1	VAL; 2	MAG; 1	MAG; 2	PER; 1	PER; 2	BRN; 1	BRN; 2	DON; 1	DON; 2	SPA; 1	SPA; 2	AND; 1	AND; 2	OSC; 1	OSC; 2	EST; 1; 8	**EST**; **2**; 8	MNZ; 1; 1	MNZ; 2 Ret	12th	12
2004	AutoDelta Squadra Corse	Alfa Romeo 156	MNZ; 1	MNZ; 2	VAL; 1	VAL; 2	MAG; 1	MAG; 2	HOC; 1	HOC; 2	BRN; 1	BRN; 2	**DON**; **1**; 1	DON; 2; 3	SPA; 1; 9	SPA; 2; 8	IMO; 1	IMO; 2	OSC; 1; 5	OSC; 2; 5	DUB; 1; 3	DUB; 2; 3	9th	37

=== Complete World Touring Car Championship results ===
(key) (Races in bold indicate pole position) (Races in italics indicate fastest lap)

Year	Team	Car	1	2	3	4	5	6	7	8	9	10	11	12	13	14	15	16	17	18	19	20	21	22	23	24	DC	Points
2005	Squadra Corse Alfa Romeo	Alfa Romeo 156	ITA; 1; 7	ITA; 2; 1	FRA; 1; 11	FRA; 2; 9	GBR; 1; 2	GBR; 2 Ret	SMR; 1; 7	SMR; 2; 21^{†}	MEX; 1; 4	MEX; 2; 4	BEL; 1; 5	BEL; 2; 7	**GER**; **1**; 19	GER; 2 Ret	TUR; 1; 2	TUR; 2; 4	ESP; 1 Ret	ESP; 2; 15	MAC; 1; 7	MAC; 2 Ret					8th	53
2006	SEAT Sport	SEAT León	ITA; 1; 3	ITA; 2; 9	FRA; 1; 7	FRA; 2; 4	GBR; 1; 3	GBR; 2; 3	GER; 1; 5	GER; 2; 6	BRA; 1; 5	BRA; 2; 4	MEX; 1; 5	MEX; 2; 5	CZE; 1; 14	CZE; 2; 24^{†}	TUR; 1; 17	TUR; 2; 13	ESP; 1; 9	ESP; 2; 12	MAC; 1; 10	MAC; 2; 4					8th	54
2007	N.Technology	Alfa Romeo 156	BRA; 1 Ret	BRA; 2; 11	NED; 1; 13	NED; 2; 19	**ESP**; **1**; 1	ESP; 2; 1	FRA; 1; 10	FRA; 2; 7	CZE; 1; 9	CZE; 2; 5	POR; 1; 10	POR; 2; 10	SWE; 1; 3	SWE; 2; 5	GER; 1; 3	GER; 2; 4	GBR; 1; 2	GBR; 2; 8	ITA; 1; 3	ITA; 2; 3	MAC; 1; 5	MAC; 2; 3			**3rd**	**79**
2008	N.Technology	Honda Accord Euro R	BRA; 1	BRA; 2	MEX; 1	MEX; 2	ESP; 1; 11	ESP; 2; 11	FRA; 1; 11	FRA; 2; 8	CZE; 1; 7	CZE; 2; 9	POR; 1 DNS	POR; 2 DNS	GBR; 1; 10	GBR; 2; 14	GER; 1; 15	GER; 2 Ret	EUR; 1; 3	EUR; 2; 1	ITA; 1 Ret	ITA; 2; 11	JPN; 1; 17	JPN; 2; 4	MAC; 1; 8	**MAC**; **2**; 14^{†}	15th	25
2009	Lada Sport	Lada Priora	BRA; 1	BRA; 2	MEX; 1	MEX; 2	MAR; 1	MAR; 2	FRA; 1	FRA; 2	ESP; 1	ESP; 2	CZE; 1	CZE; 2	POR; 1; 18	POR; 2; 15	GBR; 1; 18	GBR; 2; 22	GER; 1	GER; 2	ITA; 1; 6	ITA; 2; 6	JPN; 1; 11	JPN; 2 Ret	MAC; 1 DNS	MAC; 2 DNS	17th	6
2012	Lada Sport	Lada Granta WTCC	ITA; 1	ITA; 2	ESP; 1	ESP; 2	MAR; 1	MAR; 2	SVK; 1	SVK; 2	HUN; 1 Ret	HUN; 2 Ret	AUT; 1	AUT; 2	POR; 1; 17^{†}	POR; 2; 11	BRA; 1	BRA; 2	USA; 1	USA; 2	JPN; 1	JPN; 2	CHN; 1	CHN; 2	MAC; 1	MAC; 2	NC	0
2013	Lada Sport Lukoil	Lada Granta WTCC	ITA; 1 DNS	ITA; 2 DNS	MAR; 1; 10	MAR; 2 Ret	SVK; 1; 13	SVK; 2; 14	HUN; 1 Ret	HUN; 2; 12	AUT; 1; 9	AUT; 2; 12	RUS; 1; 5	RUS; 2 Ret	POR; 1; 6	POR; 2; 6	ARG; 1 Ret	ARG; 2; 20^{†}	USA; 1; 14	USA; 2; 16	JPN; 1; 6	JPN; 2; 11	CHN; 1; 8	CHN; 2; 17	MAC; 1 Ret	MAC; 2 Ret	14th	41
2014	Lada Sport Lukoil	Lada Granta 1.6T	MAR; 1; 10	MAR; 2 DNS	FRA; 1; 10	FRA; 2; 13	HUN; 1 DSQ	HUN; 2 DSQ	SVK; 1 DSQ	SVK; 2 C	AUT; 1; 13	AUT; 2 Ret	RUS; 1; 14	RUS; 2; 12	BEL; 1; 17	BEL; 2; 15	ARG; 1; 10	ARG; 2; 9	BEI; 1; 7	BEI; 2; 6	CHN; 1 Ret	CHN; 2; 10	JPN; 1; 13	JPN; 2; 12	MAC; 1; 11	MAC; 2; 9	15th	22
2015	Lada Sport Rosneft	Lada Vesta WTCC	ARG; 1 NC	**ARG**; **2** Ret	MAR; 1; 11	MAR; 2; 7	HUN; 1 DNS	HUN; 2 DNS	GER; 1	GER; 2	RUS; 1	RUS; 2	SVK; 1	SVK; 2	FRA; 1	FRA; 2	POR; 1	POR; 2	JPN; 1	JPN; 2	CHN; 1	CHN; 2	THA; 1	THA; 2	QAT; 1	QAT; 2	17th	6
2016	ALL-INKL.COM Münnich Motorsport	Chevrolet RML Cruze TC1	FRA; 1	FRA; 2	SVK; 1; 16	SVK; 2; 11	HUN; 1	HUN; 2	**MAR**; **1** Ret	MAR; 2; 6	GER; 1	GER; 2	RUS; 1; 8	RUS; 2; 6	POR; 1; 11	POR; 2; 11	ARG; 1; 9	ARG; 2; 11	JPN; 1; 13	JPN; 2; 12	CHN; 1; 12	CHN; 2; 14	QAT; 1; 10	QAT; 2; 10			14th	26

^{†} Driver did not finish the race, but was classified as he completed over 90% of the race distance.

=== Complete V8 Supercar Championship results ===
Year	Team	Car	1	2	3	4	5	6	7	8	9	10	11	12	13	14	15	16	17	18	19	20	21	22	23	24	25	26	27	Pos.	Pts
2009	Triple Eight Race Engineering	Ford Falcon FG	ADE; R1	ADE; R2	HAM; R3	HAM; R4	WIN; R5	WIN; R6	SYM; R7	SYM; R8	HDV; R9	HDV; R10	TOW; R11	TOW; R12	SAN; R13	SAN; R14	QLD; R15	QLD; R16	PHI; Q 26	PHI; R17; 21	BAT; R18; Ret	SUR; R19	SUR; R20	PHI; R21	PHI; R22	PTH; R23	PTH; R24	SYD; R25	SYD; R26	50th	180

=== Complete Scandinavian Touring Car Championship results ===
(key) (Races in bold indicate pole position) (Races in italics indicate fastest lap)

Year	Team	Car	1	2	3	4	5	6	7	8	9	10	11	12	13	14	15	16	17	18	DC	Points
2011	Polestar Racing	Volvo C30	JYL; 1; 3	JYL; 2; 8	KNU; 1; 18	KNU; 2; 11	MAN; 1; 5	MAN; 2; 5	GÖT; 1; 3	GÖT; 2; 6	FAL; 1 Ret	FAL; 2; 9	KAR; 1	KAR; 2	JYL; 1	JYL; 2	KNU; 1	KNU; 2	MAN; 1	MAN; 2	12th	64

=== Complete World Touring Car Cup results ===
(key) (Races in bold indicate pole position) (Races in italics indicate fastest lap)

Year	Team	Car	1	2	3	4	5	6	7	8	9	10	11	12	13	14	15	16	17	18	19	20	21	22	23	24	25	26	27	28	29	30	DC	Points
2018	ALL-INKL.COM Münnich Motorsport	Honda Civic Type R TCR	MAR; 1; 14	MAR; 2; 6	MAR; 3; 8	HUN; 1; 12	HUN; 2 NC	HUN; 3; 7	GER; 1; 22	GER; 2 DSQ	GER; 3; 19	NED; 1; 12	NED; 2; 3	NED; 3; 9	POR; 1 Ret	POR; 2 DNS	POR; 3 DNS	SVK; 1	SVK; 2	SVK; 3	CHN; 1	CHN; 2	CHN; 3	WUH; 1	WUH; 2	WUH; 3	JPN; 1	JPN; 2	JPN; 3	MAC; 1	MAC; 2	MAC; 3	21st	36

=== Complete Bathurst 1000 results ===
Year	Team	Car	Co-driver	Position	Laps
2009	(Australia) Triple Eight Race Engineering	Ford Falcon (FG)	(Denmark) Allan Simonsen	DNF	152

Awards and achievements
Preceded by Nelson Piquet Jr.	Autosport; National Racing Driver of the Year; 2004	Succeeded by Matt Neal
Sporting positions
Preceded by Jason Plato	British Touring Car Champion; 2002	Succeeded by Yvan Muller
Preceded by Yvan Muller	British Touring Car Champion; 2004	Succeeded by Matt Neal
Preceded by Michel Nykjær	European Touring Car Cup Champion; 2009–2010	Succeeded by Fabrizio Giovanardi
