= Rydell =

Rydell may refer to:

- Rydell (name)
- Rydell National Wildlife Refuge, National Wildlife Refuge in Minnesota, U.S.
- Rydell High School, fictional school in the 1971 musical Grease

== See also ==
- Riddell (disambiguation)
