= Riddell =

Riddell may refer to:

- Riddell (surname), with a list of people so named
- Clan Riddell, a Lowland Scottish clan
- Riddell baronets, three baronetcies created for people with the surname
- Riddell Sports Group, an American sports equipment company

== See also ==
- Riddel (disambiguation)
- Rydell (disambiguation)
