= Ridell =

Surname

Ridell is a surname. Notable people with the surname include:

- Josefine Ridell (born 1997), Swedish singer, participant in the Junior Eurovision Song Contest 2010
- Mi Ridell (born 1968), Swedish actor and singer
- Sunny Ridell, American singer and entertainer

== See also ==
- Ridel, surname
- Riddell (surname)
- Rydel, given name and surname
- Rydell (name), given name and surname
