= John Riddle =

John Riddle may refer to:

- John Riddle (baseball) (1864–1890), baseball player
- John M. Riddle (born 1937), a scholar who specializes in the history of medicine
- John Paul Riddle (1901–1989), pilot and aviation enthusiast
- John W. Riddle (1864–1941), American diplomat
- Johnny Riddle (1905–1998), baseball player

== See also ==
- John Riddell (disambiguation)
