= 1999 British Touring Car Championship =

42nd season of the British Touring Car Championship

The 1999 Auto Trader RAC British Touring Car Championship featured 26 races across 13 rounds. It began on 5 April at Donington Park and concluded on 19 September at Silverstone. The driver's title was won by Laurent Aïello in his debut season driving for the Nissan works team, with his teammate David Leslie in second place. Reigning champion Rickard Rydell finished in third place.

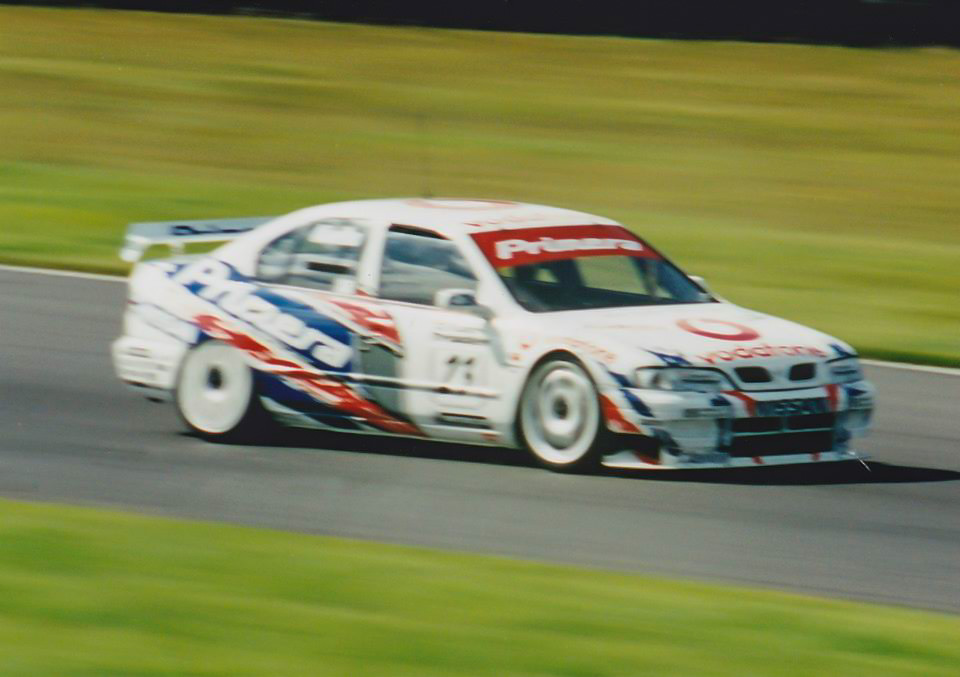
Laurent Aiello won the drivers championship driving a Nissan

One of the surprises of the season was the performance of independent driver Matt Neal. Driving for his father's Team Dynamics in a 1998 Nissan Primera, Neal became the first independent driver to win a championship race in the feature race of the first Donington round; series organisers TOCA had put up a reward for £250,000 for this achievement.

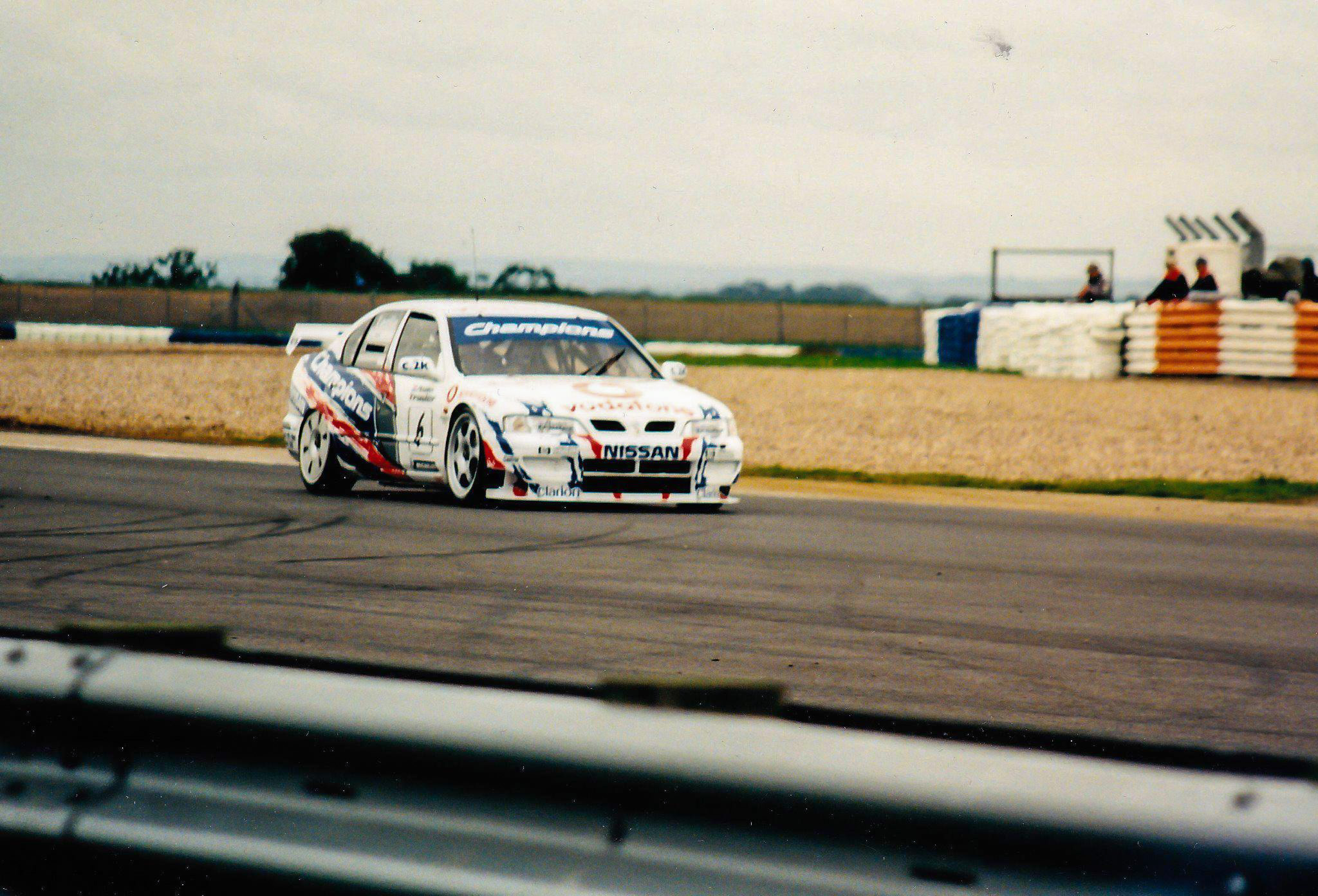
David Leslie finished 2nd driving a Nissan

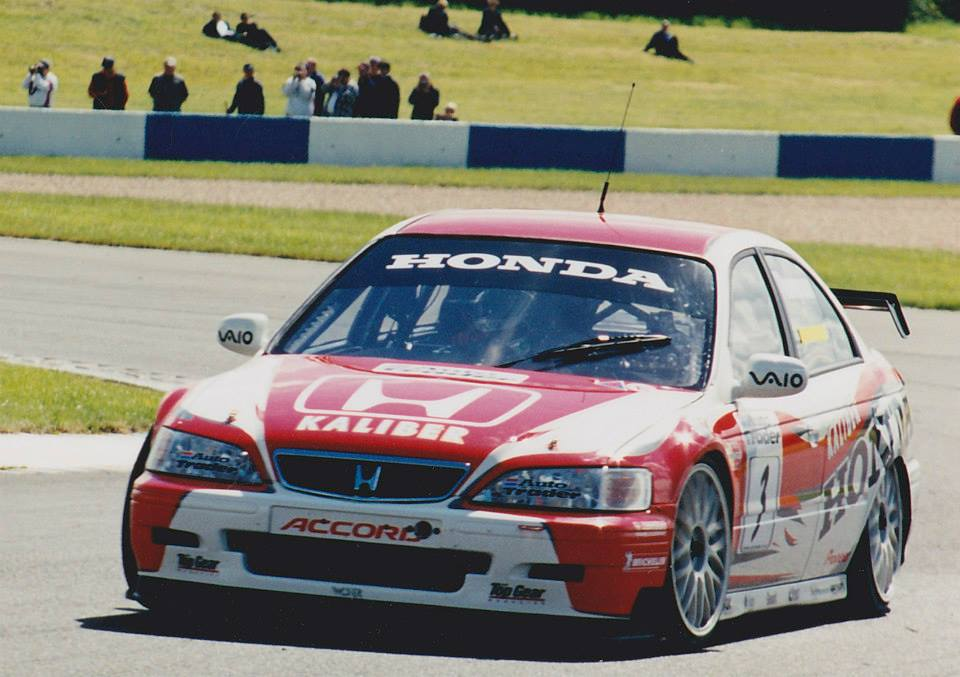
James Thompson finished fourth overall driving a Honda Accord.

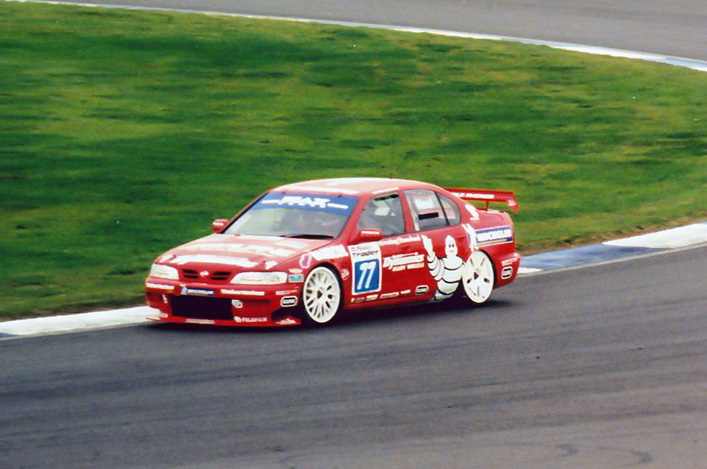
Matt Neal won the Michelin Cup for Independents and finished 9th overall driving a Nissan

== Background ==
Six manufacturer backed teams contested the 1999 championship, Audi and Peugeot having withdrawn at the end 1998. Seven independent drivers appeared on the initial entry list however neither the Atford Ford Mondeo of Gareth Howell or the TRM Motorsport BMW 320i of Collin Gallie made an appearance.

Just a single tyre manufacturer was represented (Michelin) and all competitors used the same tyre, most notably including independent runners.

Night racing was introduced to the BTCC for the first time for the rounds at Snetterton in July. The pit lane and main spectator areas were floodlit, whilst other parts of the circuit were in total darkness. To aid the drivers eyesight for the sharp changes from light to dark, the cockpits had a soft red light glowing inside.

=== Team and driver changes ===
Tom Walkinshaw Racing again ran Volvo's effort, defending champion Rickard Rydell came into the 1999 season with a new team-mate in Belgian Vincent Radermecker who had previously raced in the Belgian Procar series and replaced Italian Gianni Morbidelli.

1998 manufacturer champions Nissan once again entered two Primeras engineered by RML. David Leslie remained with the team for a third season and was joined by Frenchman Laurent Aiello, a former STW and French champion who took the seat vacated by Anthony Reid.

After a successful year in 1998 with Prodrive, Honda's effort was now to be run by WSR in a straight swap with Ford. James Thompson went into the season as title favourite and topped pre-season testing and he was joined by Peter Kox for the second year in a row. The team entered a third car for 1994 champion and STW Honda works driver Gabriele Tarquini at the Knockhill and Brands Hatch rounds.

The Williams campaign, running a pair of Renault Lagunas, was headed by Jason Plato who was promoted to lead driver following the departure of Alain Menu to Ford. He was joined by Jean-Christophe Boullion, a former Williams F1 test driver, Sauber F1 race driver and 1994 Formula 3000 champion. Boullion had missed out securing the Renault drive to Plato in 1997.

The Triple Eight Racing Vauxhall Vectras were driven by 1995 champion John Cleland, his 11th season driving for the manufacturer and he was joined by Yvan Muller following Audi's withdrawal. He replaced Derek Warwick who retired from full-time racing to focus on running the team.

Completing the factory team line-up was Ford, now run by Prodrive who had what many regarded as the strongest driver line up in the pit lane, with ’97 champion Alain Menu partnering ’98 runner-up Anthony Reid. They replaced the 1998 lineup of Will Hoy, Craig Baird and Nigel Mansell.

The Independents field was spearheaded by title favourite Matt Neal, whom had shown throughout 1998 his ability to mix it with the manufacturer backed teams. Neal's Dynamics team would again have a year old ex STW Primera at their disposal, a car that Neal had shared with Steven Richards at Bathurst in 1998.

1998 Vectra Challenge winner Mark Blair, entered a 1996 Vauxhall Vectra which had been a prize for winning the support series and had been driven by Mark Lemmer in 1998. The car was updated with the 1999 aero kit but was unable to use the latest specification engines.

Lee Brookes returned to the series driving a 1998 Honda Accord. Brookes missed four races after injuring his arm and then withdrew from the series after the second visit to Thruxton stating that nothing they did to the car made it competitive.

Paula Cook also drove a 1998 Honda Accord that she had previously driven in the final two rounds of 1998 and run by D.C Cook Motorsport. The team withdrew after the Snetterton rounds citing lack of budget.

Russell Spence started the season driving a 1998 Renault Laguna run by Arena International Spence would suffer a frightening crash at Oulton Park and step down soon after due to business commitments. He was replaced by 1991 champion Will Hoy from Snetterton onwards.

=== Season summary ===
The season would be dominated by Nissan. Aïello would notch up ten race victories to claim the title in what would be his first and only year in the British championship. Teammate David Leslie would be the Frenchman's only sustained title challenger, finishing comfortably as runner-up. The Japanese marque would be one of several though to withdraw from the series at the end of the year.

Rickard Rydell's hopes of defending his title were dashed early following six retirements in the first twelve races, but a return to form in the second half of the season allowed the Swede to finish as best of the rest behind the Nissan pair. New teammate Vincent Radermecker had a solid first season in Britain, racking up several podium finishes. Volvo however would join Nissan in departing the series come season's end.

Honda's season would be much the same as the previous one. James Thompson would win four races, but inconsistency prevented him from challenging the Nissans. Peter Kox would have an improved second year in Britain, his highlight being a maiden win under the lights at Snetterton.

Renault's season would be characterised by a lack of development along with a string of engine failures, culminating in the French marque being the third to end their programme at the end of the season. Numerous retirements hampered new team-leader Jason Plato's hopes of a title challenge, whilst rookie teammate Jean-Christophe Boullion was consistent but unspectacular, mustering only tenth in the standings.

Team newcomer Yvan Muller would continue Vauxhall's resurgence from 1998, picking up their only win of the season at Brands Hatch and becoming a regular front runner. Veteran teammate John Cleland would have a disappointing season, finishing as last of the works drivers and subsequently announcing his retirement from racing at the end of the year.

The biggest disappointment however was the Prodrive Ford team. The car showed flashes of pace, but terrible inconsistency would result in just one race win, both Menu and Reid finishing outside the top ten in the drivers championship, and bottom of the manufacturers championship.

The most memorable story of the season was Matt Neal. At the opening meeting at Donington Park, he became the first independent to win a race outright in 11 years, collecting a £250,000 prize put up by TOCA. Good form in the first half of the year saw him threatening a title challenge against the works teams, but a lack of development on his Primera saw him fall down the standings as the season progressed.

== Team and drivers ==
Team	Car	No.	Drivers	Rounds
Manufacturers
(Sweden) Volvo S40 Racing	Volvo S40	1	(Sweden) Rickard Rydell	All
(Sweden) Volvo S40 Racing	Volvo S40	11	(Belgium) Vincent Radermecker	All
(United Kingdom) Ford Team Mondeo	Ford Mondeo	2	(United Kingdom) Anthony Reid	All
(United Kingdom) Ford Team Mondeo	Ford Mondeo	4	(Switzerland) Alain Menu	All
(Japan) Team Honda Sport	Honda Accord	3	(United Kingdom) James Thompson	All
(Japan) Team Honda Sport	Honda Accord	33	(Netherlands) Peter Kox	All
(Japan) Team Honda Sport	Honda Accord	55	(Italy) Gabriele Tarquini	10–11
(France) Nescafé Blend 37 Williams Renault	Renault Laguna	5	(United Kingdom) Jason Plato	All
(France) Nescafé Blend 37 Williams Renault	Renault Laguna	37	(France) Jean-Christophe Boullion	All
(United Kingdom) Vodafone Nissan Racing	Nissan Primera GT	6	(United Kingdom) David Leslie	All
(United Kingdom) Vodafone Nissan Racing	Nissan Primera GT	23	(France) Laurent Aïello	All
(United Kingdom) Vauxhall Motorsport	Vauxhall Vectra	7	(France) Yvan Muller	All
(United Kingdom) Vauxhall Motorsport	Vauxhall Vectra	8	(United Kingdom) John Cleland	All
Independents
(United Kingdom) ADR Motorsport	Vauxhall Vectra	15	(United Kingdom) Mark Blair	All
(United Kingdom) Arena International	Renault Laguna	17	(United Kingdom) Russell Spence	1–7
(United Kingdom) Arena International	Renault Laguna	17	(United Kingdom) Will Hoy	8–13
Atford Ltd	Ford Mondeo	18	(United Kingdom) Gareth Howell	None
TRM Motorsport	BMW 320i	19	(United Kingdom) Colin Gallie	None
(United Kingdom) DC Cook Motorsport	Honda Accord	22	(United Kingdom) Paula Cook	1–8
(United Kingdom) Max Power Racing Team Dynamics	Nissan Primera GT	77	(United Kingdom) Matt Neal	All
(United Kingdom) Brookes Motorsport	Honda Accord	99	(United Kingdom) Lee Brookes	1–3, 6–9

- Although Gareth Howell and Colin Gallie appeared on the official entry list, neither would race.

== Race calendar and results ==
All races were held in the United Kingdom.

Round		Circuit	Date	Pole position	Fastest lap	Winning driver	Winning team	Winning independent
1	R1	Donington Park (National), Leicestershire	5 April	(United Kingdom) James Thompson	(United Kingdom) David Leslie	(United Kingdom) James Thompson	Team Honda Sport	(United Kingdom) Matt Neal
1	R2	Donington Park (National), Leicestershire	5 April	(United Kingdom) Matt Neal	(United Kingdom) Anthony Reid	(United Kingdom) Matt Neal	Max Power Racing Team Dynamics	(United Kingdom) Matt Neal
2	R3	Silverstone Circuit (International), Northamptonshire	18 April	(United Kingdom) David Leslie	(United Kingdom) David Leslie	(France) Laurent Aïello	Vodafone Nissan Racing	(United Kingdom) Matt Neal
2	R4	Silverstone Circuit (International), Northamptonshire	18 April	(France) Laurent Aïello	(France) Laurent Aïello	(United Kingdom) Jason Plato	Nescafé Blend 37 Williams Renault	(United Kingdom) Paula Cook
3	R5	Thruxton Circuit, Hampshire	3 May	(Sweden) Rickard Rydell	(France) Laurent Aïello	(France) Laurent Aïello	Vodafone Nissan Racing	(United Kingdom) Matt Neal
3	R6	Thruxton Circuit, Hampshire	3 May	(Sweden) Rickard Rydell	(Belgium) Vincent Radermecker	(France) Laurent Aïello	Vodafone Nissan Racing	(United Kingdom) Lee Brookes
4	R7	Brands Hatch (Indy), Kent	16 May	(Switzerland) Alain Menu	(United Kingdom) Jason Plato	(France) Yvan Muller	Vauxhall Motorsport	(United Kingdom) Mark Blair
4	R8	Brands Hatch (Indy), Kent	16 May	(France) Laurent Aïello	(United Kingdom) Jason Plato	(France) Laurent Aïello	Vodafone Nissan Racing	(United Kingdom) Matt Neal
5	R9	Oulton Park (Fosters), Cheshire	31 May	(France) Laurent Aïello	(Sweden) Rickard Rydell	(France) Laurent Aïello	Vodafone Nissan Racing	(United Kingdom) Matt Neal
5	R10	Oulton Park (Fosters), Cheshire	31 May	(France) Laurent Aïello	(United Kingdom) David Leslie	(France) Laurent Aïello	Vodafone Nissan Racing	(United Kingdom) Matt Neal
6	R11	Donington Park (Grand Prix), Leicestershire	20 June	(United Kingdom) James Thompson	(Sweden) Rickard Rydell	(United Kingdom) James Thompson	Team Honda Sport	(United Kingdom) Matt Neal
6	R12	Donington Park (Grand Prix), Leicestershire	20 June	(United Kingdom) David Leslie	(United Kingdom) David Leslie	(United Kingdom) David Leslie	Vodafone Nissan Racing	(United Kingdom) Matt Neal
7	R13	Croft Circuit, North Yorkshire	4 July	(United Kingdom) James Thompson	(United Kingdom) David Leslie	(United Kingdom) James Thompson	Team Honda Sport	(United Kingdom) Matt Neal
7	R14	Croft Circuit, North Yorkshire	4 July	(United Kingdom) James Thompson	(Sweden) Rickard Rydell	(Sweden) Rickard Rydell	Volvo S40 Racing	(United Kingdom) Matt Neal
8	R15	Snetterton Circuit, Norfolk	17 July	(France) Laurent Aïello	(United Kingdom) David Leslie	(United Kingdom) David Leslie	Vodafone Nissan Racing	(United Kingdom) Matt Neal
8	R16	Snetterton Circuit, Norfolk	17 July	(France) Laurent Aïello	(France) Laurent Aïello	(Netherlands) Peter Kox	Team Honda Sport	(United Kingdom) Matt Neal
9	R17	Thruxton Circuit, Hampshire	1 August	(Sweden) Rickard Rydell	(Sweden) Rickard Rydell	(France) Laurent Aïello	Vodafone Nissan Racing	(United Kingdom) Matt Neal
9	R18	Thruxton Circuit, Hampshire	1 August	(Sweden) Rickard Rydell	(Sweden) Rickard Rydell	(United Kingdom) David Leslie	Vodafone Nissan Racing	(United Kingdom) Will Hoy
10	R19	Knockhill Circuit, Fife	15 August	(France) Laurent Aïello	(France) Laurent Aïello	(France) Laurent Aïello	Vodafone Nissan Racing	(United Kingdom) Matt Neal
10	R20	Knockhill Circuit, Fife	15 August	(Switzerland) Alain Menu	(Italy) Gabriele Tarquini	(Switzerland) Alain Menu	Ford Team Mondeo	(United Kingdom) Mark Blair
11	R21	Brands Hatch (Indy), Kent	30 August	(France) Laurent Aïello	(United Kingdom) David Leslie	(Sweden) Rickard Rydell	Volvo S40 Racing	(United Kingdom) Matt Neal
11	R22	Brands Hatch (Indy), Kent	30 August	(Sweden) Rickard Rydell	(France) Jean-Christophe Boullion	(France) Laurent Aïello	Vodafone Nissan Racing	(United Kingdom) Matt Neal
12	R23	Oulton Park (Island), Cheshire	12 September	(United Kingdom) David Leslie	(United Kingdom) David Leslie	(France) Laurent Aïello	Vodafone Nissan Racing	(United Kingdom) Matt Neal
12	R24	Oulton Park (Island), Cheshire	12 September	(United Kingdom) David Leslie	(United Kingdom) James Thompson	(United Kingdom) James Thompson	Team Honda Sport	(United Kingdom) Matt Neal
13	R25	Silverstone Circuit (International), Northamptonshire	19 September	(France) Laurent Aïello	(United Kingdom) Jason Plato	(Sweden) Rickard Rydell	Volvo S40 Racing	(United Kingdom) Will Hoy
13	R26	Silverstone Circuit (International), Northamptonshire	19 September	(France) Laurent Aïello	(Sweden) Rickard Rydell	(Sweden) Rickard Rydell	Volvo S40 Racing	(United Kingdom) Matt Neal

== Championship standings ==
Points system
**1st**	**2nd**	**3rd**	**4th**	**5th**	**6th**	**7th**	**8th**	**9th**	**10th**	Pole position	Lead a lap in feature race
15	12	10	8	6	5	4	3	2	1	1	1

- No driver may collect more than one "Lead a Lap" point per race no matter how many laps they lead.
- Drivers' top 22 results count towards the championship.

=== Drivers Championship ===
Pos	Driver	DON		SIL		THR		BRH		OUL		DON		CRO		SNE		THR		KNO		BRH		OUL		SIL		Pts
1	(France) Laurent Aïello	11	Ret	1	**6**	1	1*	3	**1***	**1**	**1***	Ret	2*	5	3	**Ret**	**7**	1	5*	**1**	DSQ	**2**	1*	1	2	**9**	(**Ret**)	244(245)
2	(United Kingdom) David Leslie	4	Ret	**2**	7	11	Ret	6	2	2	8*	2	**1***	2	4	1	2*	4	1*	9	3	4	2*	**2**	**4***	11	2*	228
3	(Sweden) Rickard Rydell	7	Ret	3	Ret	**2**	**2***	Ret	Ret	7	Ret	Ret	4	4	1*	2	8	**2**	**Ret***	6	5	1	**5***	3	3	1	1*	192
4	(United Kingdom) James Thompson	**1**	2*	5	4	5	8	7	6*	11	Ret	**1**	3	**1**	**2***	9	15	7	Ret	14	Ret	3	3	DSQ	1*	2	9	174
5	(United Kingdom) Jason Plato	3	3	6	1*	Ret	4*	4	Ret*	Ret	Ret	3	8	6	6	4	6	5	4	Ret	Ret	6	8	Ret	6	Ret	Ret	122
6	(France) Yvan Muller	6	10	Ret	2	Ret	11	1	5	8	3	4	5	8	8	Ret	3	8	6	10	7	12	Ret	9	5	3	5	119
7	(Netherlands) Peter Kox	9	7	9	5	6	5	Ret	4	9	7	7	Ret	3	9	6	1*	9	9	Ret	2	9	4*	5	Ret	7	Ret	113
8	(Belgium) Vincent Radermecker	10	5	11	Ret	4	3	Ret	Ret	5	4*	10	12	7	7	3	5	3	2	11	8	10	7	4	13	Ret	4	111
9	(United Kingdom) Matt Neal	5	**1***	4	Ret	3	Ret	Ret	3	10	2	9	7	10	5*	7	10	6	Ret	7	Ret	5	10	6	10	Ret	6	110
10	(France) Jean-Christophe Boullion	Ret	6	8	3	9	7*	5	7	6	6	8	10	11	Ret	5	4	13	11	5	4	7	6	7	7	8	Ret	97
11	(Switzerland) Alain Menu	2	Ret	13	Ret	Ret	6	**12**	Ret	3	Ret	5	6	Ret	Ret	8	9*	11	3	3	**1***	Ret	Ret	Ret	9	12	Ret	84
12	(United Kingdom) Anthony Reid	Ret	Ret	7	DSQ	8	Ret	2	8	4	5	11	9	Ret	10*	Ret	11	Ret	7*	4	Ret	8	12*	12	8	4	3	78
13	(United Kingdom) John Cleland	8	4*	10	8	7	9	8	9	12	Ret	6	Ret	9	Ret	12	12	12	Ret	8	9	11	9	8	Ret	5	10	51
14	(Italy) Gabriele Tarquini																			2	6	Ret	Ret					17
15	(United Kingdom) Will Hoy															10	13	10	8	13	11	13	11	10	11	6	7	15
16	(United Kingdom) Mark Blair	13	Ret	12	11	12	12	9	10	13	9	12	11	12	Ret	13	DNS	Ret	10	12	10	14	13	11	12	10	8	11
17	(United Kingdom) Lee Brookes	12	9	Ret	10	10	10	DNS	DNS			13	Ret	13	12	11	16	14	Ret									5
18	(United Kingdom) Russell Spence	15	8	Ret	Ret	13	14	11	Ret	DNS	DNS	14	Ret	15	11													3
19	(United Kingdom) Paula Cook	14	Ret	Ret	9	Ret	13	10	Ret	Ret	Ret	15	13	14	13	Ret	14											3
Pos	Driver	DON		SIL		THR		BRH		OUL		DON		CRO		SNE		THR		KNO		BRH		OUL		SIL		Pts

Note: **bold** signifies pole position (1 point awarded all races), italics signifies fastest lap.

* signifies that driver lead feature race for at least one lap (1 point given).

=== Michelin Cup for Independents ===
Pos	Driver	DON		SIL		THR		BRH		OUL		DON		CRO		SNE		THR		KNO		BRH		OUL		SIL		Pts
1	(United Kingdom) Matt Neal	**5**	**1**	**4**	**Ret**	**3**	**Ret**	**(Ret)**	**3**	**10**	**2**	**9**	**7**	10	**5**	**7**	**10**	**6**	**(Ret)**	**7**	**(Ret)**	**5**	**10**	**6**	**10**	**(Ret)**	**6**	353(361)
2	(United Kingdom) Mark Blair	13	Ret	12	11	11	12	9	10	13	9	12	11	12	Ret	13	DNS	Ret	10	12	10	14	13	11	12	10	8	183
3	(United Kingdom) Will Hoy															10	13	10	8	13	11	13	11	10	11	6	7	131
4	(United Kingdom) Lee Brookes	12	9	Ret	10	10	10	DNS	DNS			13	Ret	13	12	11	16	14	Ret									78
5	(United Kingdom) Paula Cook	14	Ret	Ret	9	Ret	13	10	Ret	Ret	Ret	15	13	**14**	13	Ret	14											41
6	(United Kingdom) Russell Spence	15	8	Ret	Ret	13	14	11	Ret	DNS	DNS	14	Ret	15	11													25
Pos.	Driver	DON		SIL		THR		BRH		OUL		DON		CRO		SNE		THR		KNO		BRH		OUL		SIL		Pts

Colour	Result
Gold	Winner
Silver	Second place
Bronze	Third place
Green	Points classification
Blue	Non-points classification
Blue	Non-classified finish (NC)
Purple	Retired, not classified (Ret)
Red	Did not qualify (DNQ)
Red	Did not pre-qualify (DNPQ)
Black	Disqualified (DSQ)
White	Did not start (DNS)
White	Withdrew (WD)
White	Race cancelled (C)
Blank	Did not practice (DNP)
Blank	Did not arrive (DNA)
Blank	Excluded (EX)

**Bold** – Pole
Italics – Fastest Lap

=== Manufacturers Championship ===
Pos	Manufacturer	DON		SIL		THR		BRH		OUL		DON		CRO		SNE		THR		KNO		BRH		OUL		SIL		Pts
1	Nissan / Vodafone Nissan Racing	4	Ret	1	6	1	1	3	1	1	1	2	1	2	3	1	2	1	1	1	3	2	1	1	2	9	2	464
1	Nissan / Vodafone Nissan Racing	11	Ret	2	7	11	Ret	6	2	2	8	Ret	2	5	4	Ret	7	4	5	9	EX	4	2	2	4	11	Ret	464
2	Honda / Team Honda Sport	1	2	5	4	5	5	7	4	9	7	1	3	1	2	6	1	7	9	2	2	3	3	5	1	2	9	296
2	Honda / Team Honda Sport	9	7	9	5	6	8	Ret	6	11	Ret	7	Ret	3	9	9	15	9	Ret	14	6	9	4	DSQ	Ret	7	Ret	296
3	Volvo / Volvo S40 Racing	7	5	3	Ret	2	2	Ret	Ret	5	4	9	4	4	1	2	5	2	2	6	5	1	5	3	3	1	1	295
3	Volvo / Volvo S40 Racing	10	Ret	11	Ret	4	3	Ret	Ret	7	Ret	Ret	12	7	7	3	8	3	Ret	11	8	10	7	4	13	Ret	4	295
4	Renault / Nescafé Blend 37 Williams Renault	3	3	6	1	9	4	4	7	6	6	3	8	6	6	4	4	5	4	5	4	6	6	7	6	8	Ret	227
4	Renault / Nescafé Blend 37 Williams Renault	Ret	6	8	3	Ret	7	5	Ret	Ret	Ret	8	10	11	Ret	5	6	13	11	Ret	Ret	7	8	Ret	7	Ret	Ret	227
5	Vauxhall / Vauxhall Motorsport	6	4	10	2	7	9	1	5	8	3	4	5	8	8	12	3	8	6	8	7	11	9	8	5	3	5	186
5	Vauxhall / Vauxhall Motorsport	8	10	Ret	8	Ret	11	8	9	12	Ret	6	Ret	9	Ret	Ret	12	12	Ret	10	9	12	Ret	9	Ret	5	10	186
6	Ford / Ford Team Mondeo	2	Ret	7	Ret	8	6	2	8	3	5	5	6	Ret	10	8	9	11	3	3	1	8	12	12	8	4	3	164
6	Ford / Ford Team Mondeo	Ret	Ret	13	DSQ	Ret	Ret	12	Ret	4	Ret	11	9	Ret	Ret	Ret	11	Ret	7	4	Ret	Ret	Ret	Ret	9	12	Ret	164
Pos	Manufacturer	DON		SIL		THR		BRH		OUL		DON		CRO		SNE		THR		KNO		BRH		OUL		SIL		Pts

=== Teams Championship ===
Pos	Team	DON	SIL	THR	BRH	OUL	DON	CRO	SNE	THR	KNO	BRH	OUL	SIL	Pts
1	Vodafone Nissan Racing	Ret	6	1	1	1	1	3	2	1	3	1	2	2	210
1	Vodafone Nissan Racing	Ret	7	Ret	2	8	2	4	7	5	DSQ	2	4	Ret	210
2	Team Honda Sport	2	4	5	4	7	3	2	1	9	2	3	1	9	132
2	Team Honda Sport	7	5	8	6	Ret	Ret	9	15	Ret	6	4	Ret	Ret	132
3	Volvo S40 Racing	5	Ret	2	Ret	4	4	1	5	2	5	5	3	1	127
3	Volvo S40 Racing	Ret	Ret	3	Ret	Ret	12	7	8	Ret	8	7	13	4	127
4	Nescafé Blend 37 Williams Renault	3	1	4	7	6	8	6	4	4	4	6	6	Ret	108
4	Nescafé Blend 37 Williams Renault	6	3	7	Ret	Ret	10	Ret	6	11	Ret	8	7	Ret	108
5	Vauxhall Motorsport	4	2	9	5	3	5	8	3	6	7	9	5	5	83
5	Vauxhall Motorsport	10	8	11	9	Ret	Ret	Ret	12	Ret	9	Ret	Ret	10	83
6	Team Dynamics	1	Ret	Ret	3	2	7	5	10	Ret	Ret	10	10	6	55
7	Ford Team Mondeo	Ret	Ret	6	8	5	6	10	9	3	1	12	8	3	53
7	Ford Team Mondeo	Ret	DSQ	Ret	Ret	Ret	9	Ret	11	7	Ret	Ret	9	Ret	53
8	Arena International	8	Ret	14	Ret	DNS	Ret	11	13	8	11	11	11	7	10
9	ADR Motorsport	Ret	11	12	10	9	11	Ret	DNS	10	10	13	12	8	7
10	Brookes Motorsport	9	10	10	DNS		Ret	12	16	Ret					4
11	DC Cook Motorsport	Ret	9	13	Ret	Ret	13	13	14						2
Pos	Team	DON	SIL	THR	BRH	OUL	DON	CRO	SNE	THR	KNO	BRH	OUL	SIL	Pts

=== Points System ===
The points system used for the 1999 British Touring Car Championship was as follows. For the drivers championship, 15 points were awarded to the winner of each race, 12 to second place, 10 for third and 8,6,5,4,3,2,1 for fourth to tenth place respectively. At the end of the season, drivers would drop their four lowest scores. A point would be awarded to the driver who achieved pole position for each race, and a point was awarded to anyone who led the feature race.

For the manufactures championship, the same number of points for the top ten finishing positions were awarded as for the drivers championship but only the top two per manufacturer would receive points for the manufacturer. At the end of the season, manufacturers would drop the points from their worst four rounds of the championship. No points were received for leading laps or pole position.
