= BTC-T Alfa Romeo 147 =

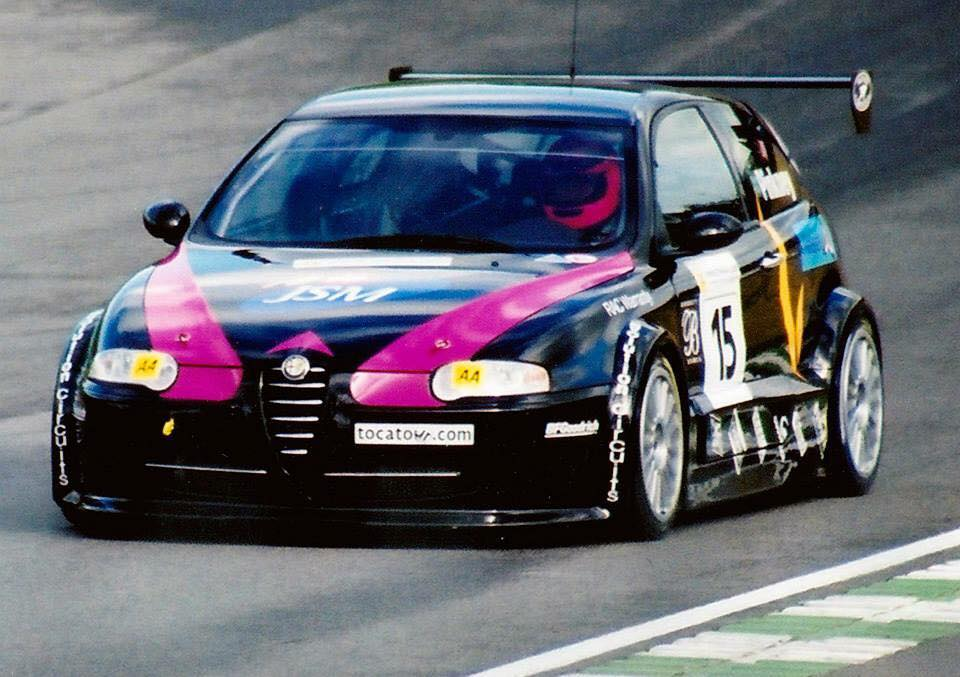
- David Pinkney driving the JS Motorsport Alfa Romeo 147 during the 2001 British Touring Car Championship season.
- Category: BTCC
- Constructor: JS Motorsport

Technical specifications
- Chassis: Alfa Romeo 147
- Engine: 1,969 cc (120.2 cu in) 270 hp (201 kW; 274 PS) In-line 4 NA front-mounted, FWD
- Transmission: 6-speed Sequential
- Weight: 1,150 kg (2,535.3 lb)

Competition history
- Notable entrants: JS Motorsport
- Notable drivers: Tom Ferrier; Dave Pinkney; Tim Harvey; Mark Blair
- Debut: 2001 BTCC at Brands Hatch Indy Circuit
Races	Wins	Poles	F/Laps
20	0	0	0
- Teams' Championships: 0
- Constructors' Championships: 0
- Drivers' Championships: 0

One of the new BTC Touring specification cars entered in the 2001 BTCC season was the JS Motorsport-built Alfa Romeo 147. It was the first of the independently built BTC-T cars to race, being ready in time for the first round of the season. Despite originally intending to run 4 BTC-T spec and 2 Production spec cars, only 2 BTC-T cars were ever entered in one event, and no Production spec car was ever built. The team had 4 different drivers across the season: the experienced David Pinkney (rounds 1-4) and Tim Harvey (rounds 3-4 and 9-13) sharing drives with the younger Mark Blair (rounds 10-11) and Tom Ferrier (rounds 2, 7-9 and 12-13). Darren Malkin had been announced, before the season started, as one of the drivers; however, he never made an appearance.

The 147 proved to be unreliable, racking up 16 DNFs across the season, failing to start seven other races, and a multitude of other reliability gremlins. Despite this, the car was reasonably competitive - Harvey taking a surprise podium at the feature race at Oulton Park, albeit in a race marred by attrition, and Ferrier was running in a fine second place at Donington Park until engine failure ended his race. Harvey was the most successful driver, finishing 8th in the Driver's championship, whilst JS Motorsport's 4th place in the Team's championship was more a reflection of the small grid than anything else. The team did not reappear for 2002, and the 147s were not raced again.
