= Ridel =

Surname

Ridel is a surname. Notable people with the surname include:

- Geoffrey Ridel, Duke of Gaeta (died 1084), the Duke of Gaeta as a vassal of the Prince of Capua from 1067 or 1068
- Geoffrey Ridel (bishop of Ely) (died 1189), the nineteenth Lord Chancellor of England, from 1162 to 1173
- Geoffrey Ridel (royal justice) (died 1120), landholder and royal justice during the reign of King Henry I of England
- Gualganus Ridel, the Duke of Gaeta as a vassal of the Prince of Capua in the late 1080s until 1091
- Kevin Ridel, American musician and songwriter
- Raynald Ridel, the Duke of Gaeta as a vassal of the Prince of Capua from 1086 until his death
- Stefanie Ridel (born 1973), American singer, songwriter, and actress
- Vladimir Ridel (born 1985), Russian professional football player

== See also ==
- Ridell, surname
- Rydel, given name and surname
