= Mark Blair =

British racing driver (born 1974)

- Nationality: (United Kingdom) British
- Born: 27 November 1974 (age 51) Matlock, Derbyshire, England

British Touring Car Championship
- Years active: 1999, 2001
- Teams: ADR Motorsport; JS Motorsport
- Starts: 29
- Wins: 0
- Poles: 0
- Fastest laps: 0
- Best finish: 12th in 2001

Championship titles
- 1998: Vauxhall Vectra Challenge

Mark Blair (born 27 November 1974) is a British racing driver. He started his racing career in karting in 1986, and represented England in the 1990 World Kart Championships. In 1992, he switched to rallying, driving in the Peugeot Challenge, where he finished fourth in points. In 1993, he went on to be the Peugeot Challenge champion, including eight class wins. He moved into saloon car racing in 1997 with the Vauxhall Vectra Challenge, becoming champion in 1998.

After his success in the Vectra, Blair got a drive in the British Touring Car Championship. He raced as an independent for ADR Motorsport, again in a Vectra. His first season in the BTCC was a successful one, finishing second in the independents Cup with two independent wins, and sixteenth in points overall. In 2001, he raced in four rounds at Oulton Park and Silverstone for JS Motorsport in an Alfa Romeo 147. Amongst a small field of drivers, he still finished joined eleventh in the championship with fifteen points.

== Racing record ==
=== Complete British Touring Car Championship results ===
(key) (Races in bold indicate pole position - 1 point awarded all races) (Races in italics indicate fastest lap) (* signifies that driver lead feature race for at least one lap - 1 point awarded)

Year	Team	Car	Class	1	2	3	4	5	6	7	8	9	10	11	12	13	14	15	16	17	18	19	20	21	22	23	24	25	26	Pos	Pts
1999	ADR Motorsport	Vauxhall Vectra		DON; 1; 13	DON; 2 Ret	SIL; 1; 12	SIL; 2; 11	THR; 1; 12	THR; 2; 12	BRH; 1; 9	BRH; 2; 10	OUL; 1; 13	OUL; 2; 9	DON; 1; 12	DON; 2; 11	CRO; 1; 12	CRO; 2 Ret	SNE; 1; 13	SNE; 2 DNS	THR; 1 Ret	THR; 2; 10	KNO; 1; 12	KNO; 2; 10	BRH; 1; 14	BRH; 2; 13	OUL; 1; 11	OUL; 2; 12	SIL; 1; 10	SIL; 2; 8	16th	11
2001	JS Motorsport	Alfa Romeo 147	T	BRH; 1	BRH; 2	THR; 1	THR; 2	OUL; 1	OUL; 2	SIL; 1	SIL; 2	MON; 1	MON; 2	DON; 1	DON; 2	KNO; 1	KNO; 2	SNE; 1	SNE; 2	CRO; 1	CRO; 2	OUL; 1 ovr:15 cls:8	OUL; 2 ovr:4 cls:4	SIL; 1 ovr:15 cls:8	SIL; 2 Ret	DON; 1	DON; 2	BRH; 1	BRH; 2	12th	15
