= Rydell (name) =

Rydell is both a surname and a given name. Notable people with the name include:

== Surname ==
- Annette Rydell (born 1965), Swedish politician
- Bobby Rydell (1942–2022), American singer, mainly of rock and roll music
- Ewa Rydell (born 1942), Swedish artistic gymnast and 1963 European Championships medallist
- Ingvar Rydell (1922–2013), Swedish football player
- Mark Rydell (1929–2026), American actor, film director and producer
- Rick Rydell (born 1963), American talk radio host, outdoorsman, writer and author
- Rickard Rydell (born 1967), Swedish racing driver
- Sven Rydell (1905–1975), Swedish footballer

== Given name ==
- Rydell Booker (born 1981), heavyweight boxer
- Rydell Melancon (born 1962), American football player
- Rydell Poepon (born 1987), Dutch footballer

== See also ==
- Rydel, given name and surname
- Ridell, surname
