= James Riddell =

James Riddell may refer to:

- James Riddell (skier) (1909–2000), British skier and author
- James Riddell (politician) (1850–1926), Scottish-Canadian farmer and political figure in Manitoba
- James Riddell (scholar) (1823–1866), English classical scholar
- James Riddell (footballer) (1891–?), Scottish footballer
- Sir James Milles Riddell, 2nd Baronet (1787–1861), Scottish landowner and agricultural improver
- James Foster Riddell (1861–1915), British Army officer

== See also ==
- Jim Riddell, New Zealand rugby league player
