= John Riddell =

John Riddell may refer to:

- John Riddell (genealogist) (1785–1862), Scottish peerage lawyer
- Jack Riddell (1931–2024), Canadian politician
- John Riddell (Marxist) (born 1942), Marxist writer and former leader of the Revolutionary Workers League in Canada
- Sir John Riddell, 13th Baronet of Riddell (1934–2010)
- John Carre Riddell (1809–1879), politician in colonial Victoria (Australia)
- John Leonard Riddell (1807–1865), American scientist and author
- John Riddell, pseudonym of humorist Corey Ford (1902–1969), used for satiric book reviews
- John Riddell, a fictional character in Dinosaurs on a Spaceship
- 7 News Adelaide newsreader alongside Jane Doyle

== See also ==
- John Riddle (disambiguation)
