= Rydel =

Rydel is both a given name and surname. Notable people with this name include:

== Given name ==
- Rydel Lynch (born 1993), American singer, musician and television actress

== Surname ==
- Ben Rydel (born 2003 or 2004), English footballer
- Filip Rýdel (born 1984), Czech football player
- Lucjan Rydel (1870–1918), Polish playwright and poet
- Ryan Rydel (born 2001), English football player

== See also ==
- Rydell (name), given name and surname
