= Rickard Rydell =

Swedish racing driver (born 1967)

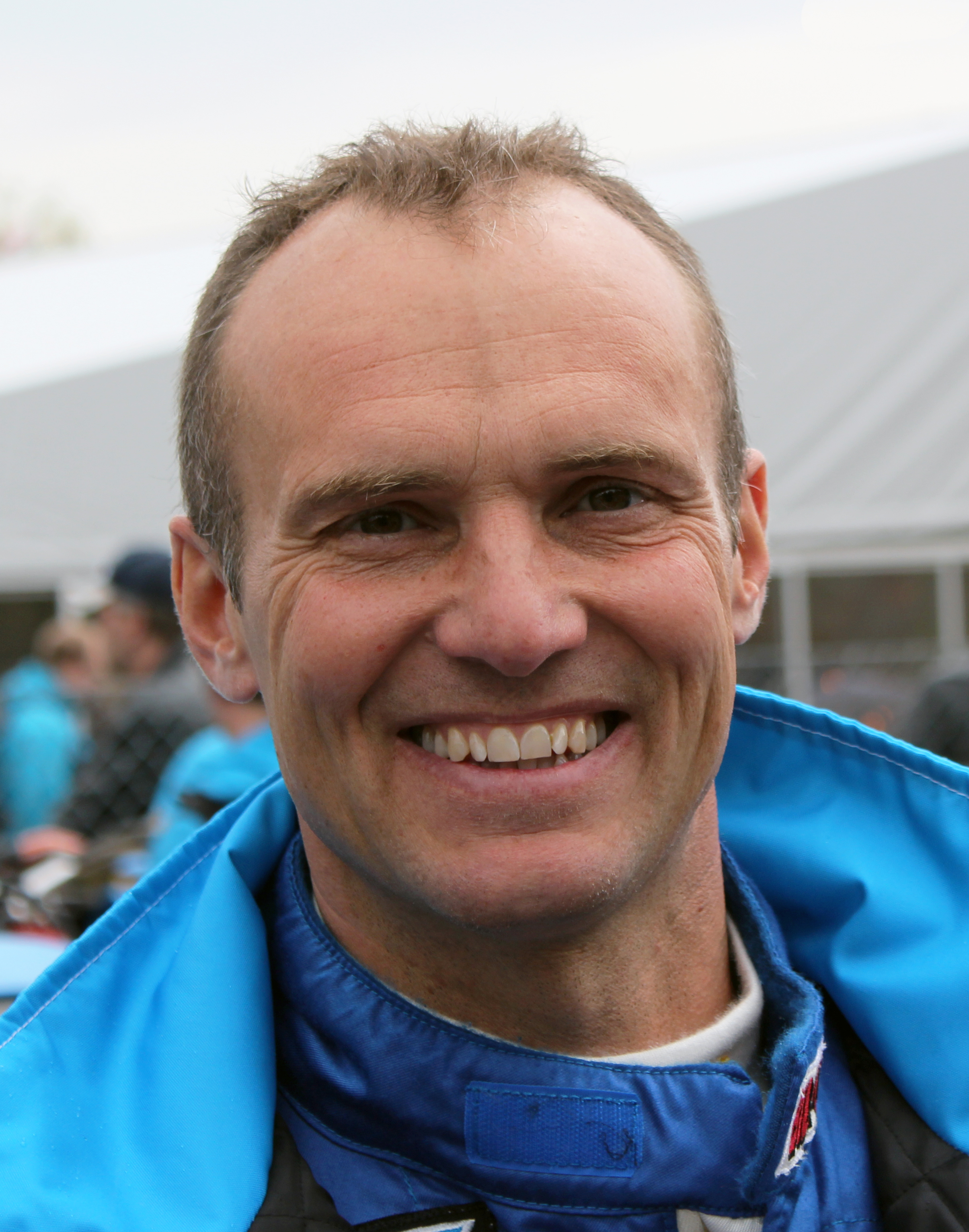
- Rydell at the first Ring Knutstorp round of the 2012 Scandinavian Touring Car Championship
- Nationality: (Sweden) Swedish
- Born: John Rickard Rydell; 22 September 1967 (age 59) Vallentuna, Sweden

World Touring Car Championship career
- Debut season: 2005
- Current team: NIKA Racing
- Car number: 69
- Former teams: SEAT Sport; Chevrolet
- Starts: 100
- Wins: 5
- Poles: 3
- Fastest laps: 5
- Best finish: 5th in 2008

Previous series
- 2011–2012 2004 2001, 2004 2002–2004 2003 2001 1994–2000 1992–1993 1992 1987–1989, 1991 1990 1990 1989 1987: Scandinavian Touring Car Championship; TC 2000 Championship; Swedish Touring Car Championship; European Touring Car Championship; V8 Supercars; FIA GT Championship; British Touring Car Championship; All-Japan F3 Championship; Japanese Formula 3000; British F3 Championship; British Formula 3000; All Japan Sports Prototype; International Formula 3000; Swedish F3 Championship; European F3 Cup

Championship titles
- 2011 1998 1992: Scandinavian Touring Car Championship; British Touring Car Championship; Macau Grand Prix

John Rickard Rydell (born 22 September 1967) is a Swedish retired racing driver. He won the 1998 British Touring Car Championship, the 2011 Scandinavian Touring Car Championship, and has also been a frontrunner in the European/World Touring Car Championship.

== Early career ==
Rydell was born in Vallentuna, Stockholm. Initially he trained to be an accountant at AB Rydell, his family's flower boutique business, but was bitten by the racing bug. In the early 1990s, he raced in various Formula Three series. He also won pole position in the 1991 Macau Grand Prix, and won the 1992 race. He competed in Japanese F3 in 1992 and 1993, British F3 in 1989 and 1991, and the Swedish F3 series in 1987 and 1988. In 1990, he raced in F3000. In 1984–1985, he won the Swedish 100cc go kart championship.

== Touring cars ==
=== BTCC ===
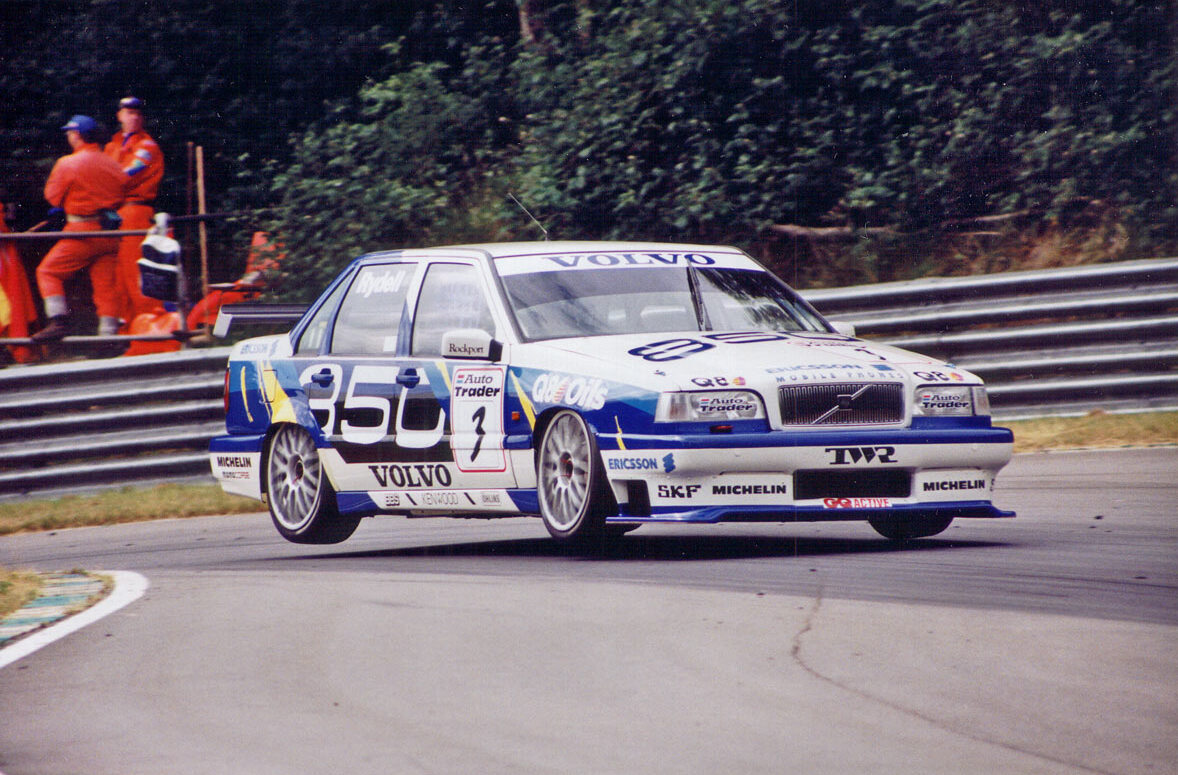
Rydell driving for Volvo in the 1996 British Touring Car Championship.

Rydell's first year in the BTCC was 1994, when his car was quite distinctive, driving a Volvo 850 Estate, when it was normal to race saloons. The TWR team switched to a saloon in 1995 and Rydell took pole for 13 of the 24 races, but due to several slow starts he won only four times and he finished on podium seven times. At the end of the year he was third in the championship, a result repeated in 1996 although Audi dominated with Frank Biela he was able to score four victories and six podiums. In 1997 Volvo switch from 850 saloon to new model Volvo S40, at the end of year he was fourth with one victory and five podiums. In 1998, he finally won the BTCC title in a Volvo with five victories and 12 podiums, beating Anthony Reid at the final meeting. He also won the 1998 Super Touring Bathurst 1000, sharing a Volvo S40 with Jim Richards. In 1999 he was again third behind the two Nissan Primera with four victories and seven podiums.

After five years with Volvo, Rydell was loaned to Ford (Prodrive) for 2000 where he finished for the fourth time in seven years third behind his two teammates Alain Menu and Anthony Reid.

=== ETCC ===
Rydell spent 2001 largely waiting for his ETCC Volvo S60 to be built, but he raced a Ferrari 550 Maranello in the FIA GT Championship for the Prodrive team. In 2002, he raced in the ETCC finishing fifth with eight podiums while in 2003, without official Volvo's support, he finished just 11th with only two podiums.

Rydell moved to SEAT's SEAT Sport team in 2004 for the ETCC driving Seat Toledo Cupra ending tenth with one victory and one podium. In 2004, he also took part in two races in the Swedish Touring Car Championship, claiming one victory.

=== WTCC ===
==== 2005 season ====
SEAT and Rydell continued in the World Touring Car Championship (WTCC) when it replaced the ETCC for 2005. He finished sixth in the championship, winning race two at Silverstone and four podiums.

==== 2006 season ====
Rydell continued with SEAT for 2006, finishing seventh, with just four podiums.

==== 2007 season ====
Rydell lost his SEAT drive for 2007, and instead drove an Aston Martin DBR9 with the Prodrive team in the GT Championship having previously worked with the team when using Ferrari's in 2004.

Rydell raced in the 2007 24 Hours of Le Mans with David Brabham and Darren Turner and they won in the GT1 class.

On the WTCC weekend in Anderstorp, Sweden, Rydell returned to the category as a fourth driver for the Chevrolet team and a local hero guest driver. He won the second race of the day, ahead of teammates Nicola Larini and Alain Menu ignoring the team order not to attack their teammate, in particular Larini who was fighting for the title championship and losing the opportunity to continue with RML until the end of the season.

Prior to the last event of the 2007 WTCC calendar in Macau, Rydell was chosen by the SEAT Sport team to race for them as an additional driver to help the team take home at least one of the main championships, either the Driver's championship via SEAT's Yvan Muller winning, or the Manufacturer's championship. The weekend though did not set off as planned, due to Rydell starting 14th on the race 1 grid and Yvan Muller started second behind the eventual winner of the first race Alain Menu in the RML run Chevrolet. Rydell finished 11th in the first race with Yvan Muller leading eight of the nine laps of the race, but due to a fuel pressure problem Muller's race weekend ended on the eighth lap even before he was able to get to the pits. During the second race, Rydell had a much better race than the first as he finished in sixth, but unfortunately his efforts were not enough to help SEAT clinch the Manufacturer's crowns, as the championship went to the reigning Manufacturer's champions BMW.

==== 2008 season ====
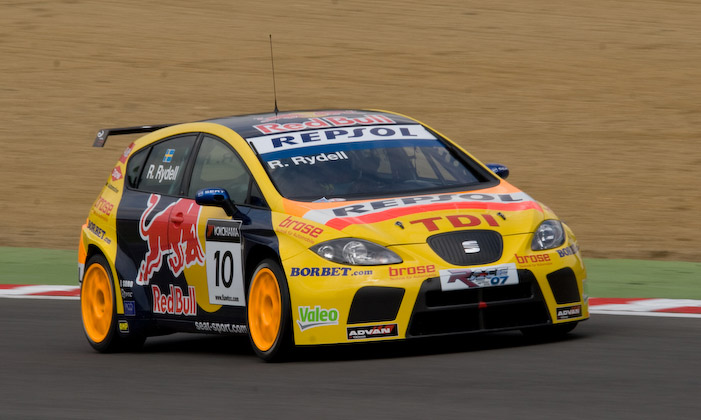
Rydell driving the SEAT Léon at Brands Hatch.

Rydell was re-signed by SEAT as one of their drivers in their five strong driver line up for an assault on the 2008 WTCC season. He finished fifth in the final standings, winning once at Estoril and once at Okayama.

==== 2009 season ====
Rydell raced for SEAT yet again in 2009, winning at Puebla and finishing seventh overall in the final standings.

==== 2011 season ====
Rydell returned to racing after a year as a commentator of the STCC for Swedish TV. He was signed to Chevrolet Motorsport Sweden team with the Cruze joining as team with his teammate Viktor Hallrup a developmental driver for the team in his second season with the team, with first season being with the Lacetti. Rydell came in as a booster driver for Chevrolet Sweden to gain results for the team as their developmental driver was still not up to speed with the top runners. Rydell won the title* at the last race of the season at Mantorp by just two points to Frederik Ekblom.

- This is under debate for Rydell passing under yellows which are not present till Turn 2, but Volkswagen (VW) Team Biogas.se brought in former STCC champion Thed Bjork, and he slowed down before Turn 1 letting three cars past before the first yellow flag light. At present VW have appealed and failed 3 times fourth might be soon.

The two pieces of evidence that Volkswagen Team Biogas.se brought in: Photo and Video, both illustrated on touringcartimes.com

This is Rydell Second National Touring car title after the BTCC championship in 1998, although he won the Bathurst 1000 that year also which was his last touring car title before his return to form in 2011.

For the 2012 season, Fredrik Ekblom did not return to the Scandinavian Touring Car Championship (STCC) and signed with Volvo Polestar in the silhouette touring car championship run by the TTA which is based on a Volvo C30 chassis alongwith Swedish drivers, i.e. Jan "Flash" Nilsson and Richard Göransson, who were STCC BMW drivers in the 2011 season.

==== 2013 season ====
Rydell joined NIKA Racing for the 2013 FIA WTCC Race of China to drive their Chevrolet Cruze 1.6T.

In a 2005 poll run by Motorsport Magazine, Rydell was voted 18th greatest touring car driver of all time.

Rydell announced his retirement from motorsport in early 2016.

== GT racing ==
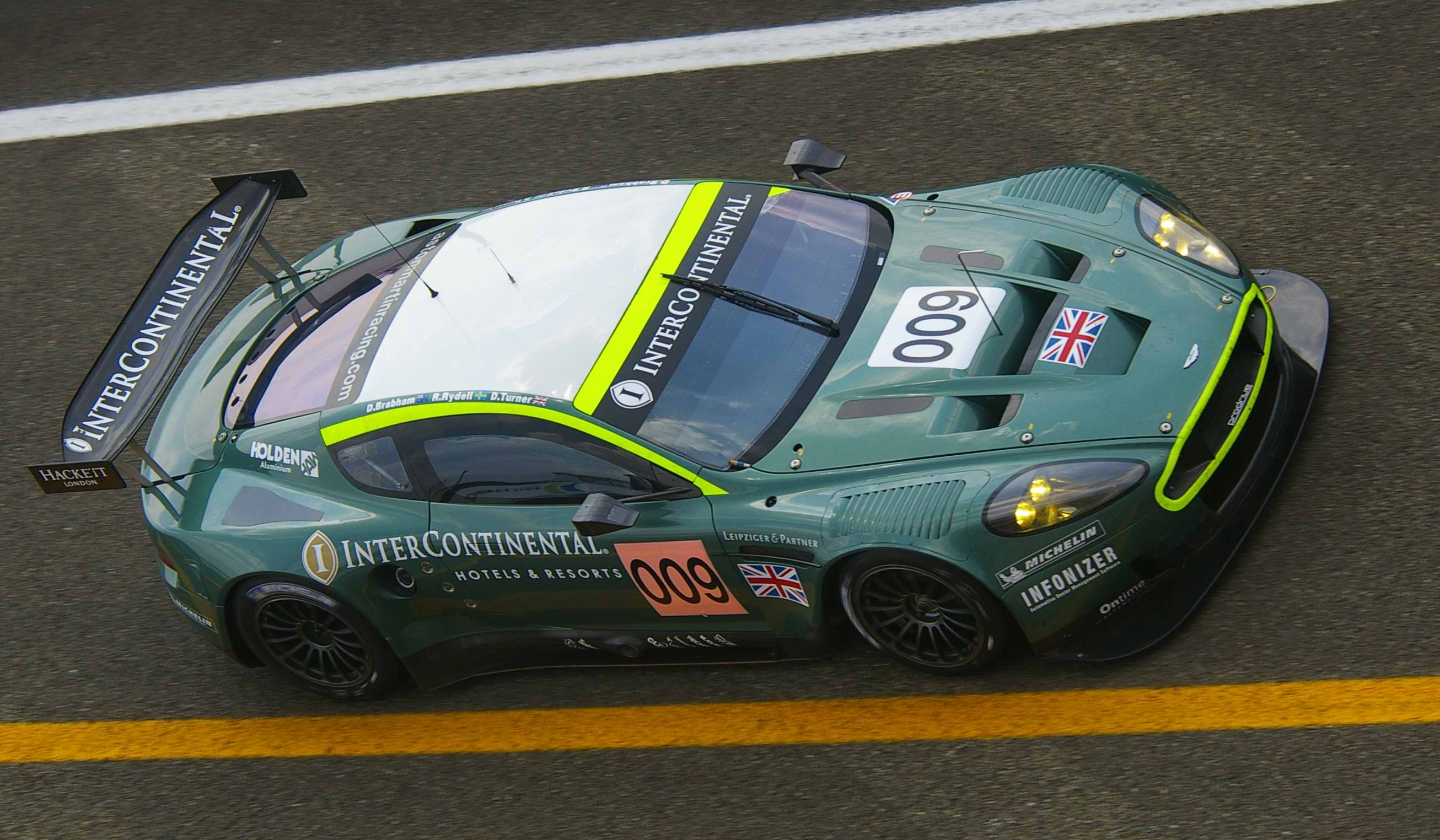
Rydell won the GT1 class of the 2007 Le Mans 24 Hours, sharing an Aston Martin DBR9 with David Brabham and Darren Turner.

Rydell raced in the 2001 FIA GT Championship for Prodrive, after the team had built a Ferrari 550-GTS Maranello. The aim was to showcase the competitiveness of the car and tempt potential race teams to buy the vehicle from Prodrive. Consequently, there were numerous drivers of the vehicle that season, Rydell being one of them. He drove five races that year, finishing third at the Nurburgring and two overall victories at the A1 Ring and Jarama respectively.

Rydell moved back to touring cars for his full-time programmes from 2002, but competed with Prodrive in the Ferrari again at the 2002 24 Hours of Le Mans, sadly retiring. For the 2004 24 Hours of Le Mans, the Prodrive Ferrari-Rydell combination finished on the GTS-class podium in third, Rydell sharing the car with Darren Turner and rally-driver Colin McRae.

After a hiatus of two years, Rydell once again teamed up with Prodrive for the 2007 24 Hours of Le Mans, this time in an Aston Martin DBR9. Sharing the car with Darren Turner and David Brabham, Rydell won the GT1 class.

== Racing record ==
=== Complete 24 Hours of Le Mans results ===
| Year | Team | Co-drivers | Car | Class | Laps | Pos. | Class pos. |
|---|---|---|---|---|---|---|---|
| 1990 | (Australia) Team Schuppan (Australia) Omron Racing | (United States) Hurley Haywood (South Africa) Wayne Taylor | Porsche 962C | C1 | 332 | 12th | 12th |
| 2002 | (United Kingdom) Prodrive | (Switzerland) Alain Menu (Czech Republic) Tomáš Enge | Ferrari 550-GTS Maranello | GTS | 174 | DNF | DNF |
| 2004 | (United Kingdom) Prodrive Racing | (United Kingdom) Darren Turner (United Kingdom) Colin McRae | Ferrari 550-GTS Maranello | GTS | 329 | 9th | **3rd** |
| 2007 | (United Kingdom) Aston Martin Racing | (Australia) David Brabham (United Kingdom) Darren Turner | Aston Martin DBR9 | GT1 | 343 | 5th | **1st** |

=== Complete Japanese Formula 3000 results ===
(key) (Races in bold indicate pole position; races in italics indicate fastest lap)

| Year | Entrant | 1 | 2 | 3 | 4 | 5 | 6 | 7 | 8 | 9 | 10 | 11 | DC | Points |
|---|---|---|---|---|---|---|---|---|---|---|---|---|---|---|
| 1992 | Team Cerumo | SUZ; 16 | FUJ; 6 | MIN; Ret | SUZ | AUT | SUG | FUJ | FUJ | SUZ | FUJ | SUZ | 18th | 1 |

=== Complete British Touring Car Championship results ===
(key) (Races in bold indicate pole position – 1 point awarded 1996 onwards in all races) (Races in italics indicate fastest lap) (* signifies that driver lead feature race for at least one lap – 1 point given)

| Year | Team | Car | Class | 1 | 2 | 3 | 4 | 5 | 6 | 7 | 8 | 9 | 10 | 11 | 12 | 13 | 14 | 15 | 16 | 17 | 18 | 19 | 20 | 21 | 22 | 23 | 24 | 25 | 26 | Pos | Pts |
|---|---|---|---|---|---|---|---|---|---|---|---|---|---|---|---|---|---|---|---|---|---|---|---|---|---|---|---|---|---|---|---|
| 1994 | Volvo 850 Racing | Volvo 850 SE/GLT | | THR; 1; 15 | BRH; 1; 22 | BRH; 2; 15 | SNE; 1 Ret | SIL; 1; 19 | SIL; 2; 13 | OUL; 1; 5 | DON; 1; 11 | DON; 2 Ret | BRH; 1; 10 | BRH; 2; 8 | SIL; 1; 8 | KNO; 1; 8 | KNO; 2; 10 | OUL; 1 Ret | BRH; 1; 15 | BRH; 2; 8 | SIL; 1; 10 | SIL; 2; 12 | DON; 1; 10 | DON; 2; 12 | | | | | | 14th | 27 |
| 1995 | Volvo 850 Racing | Volvo 850 20v | | **DON**; **1**; 4 | **DON**; **2**; 1 | **BRH**; **1**; 13 | **BRH**; **2**; 3 | THR; 1; 9 | THR; 2; 4 | **SIL**; **1**; 1 | **SIL**; **2**; 2 | OUL; 1; 1 | **OUL**; **2**; 2 | BRH; 1; 7 | BRH; 2 DNS | DON; 1; 2 | DON; 2; 6 | SIL; 1; 17 | **KNO**; **1**; 1 | **KNO**; **2**; 2 | **BRH**; **1**; 2 | **BRH**; **2**; 3 | **SNE**; **1**; 14 | **SNE**; **2** Ret | OUL; 1; 5 | OUL; 2; 10 | SIL; 1; 7 | SIL; 2 Ret | | **3rd** | **255** |
| 1996 | Volvo 850 Racing | Volvo 850 20v | | **DON**; **1** Ret | DON; 2; 3 | BRH; 1; 4 | BRH; 2; 3 | THR; 1; 3 | THR; 2; 8 | SIL; 1; 4 | SIL; 2; 5 | OUL; 1; 4 | OUL; 2; 1 | SNE; 1 Ret | SNE; 2; 5 | BRH; 1; 3 | BRH; 2; 12 | SIL; 1; 2 | SIL; 2; 4 | **KNO**; **1**; 4 | **KNO**; **2**; 1 | OUL; 1; 5 | OUL; 2 Ret | THR; 1; 3 | THR; 2; 1 | **DON**; **1**; 1 | **DON**; **2** Ret | BRH; 1; 5 | BRH; 2 Ret | **3rd** | **194** |
| 1997 | Volvo S40 Racing | Volvo S40 | | DON; 1 Ret | DON; 2; 2 | SIL; 1; 2 | SIL; 2; 2 | THR; 1; 5 | THR; 2; 5 | BRH; 1; 7 | BRH; 2; 16 | OUL; 1; 6 | OUL; 2; 3 | DON; 1; 5 | DON; 2; 7 | CRO; 1; 3 | CRO; 2; 9 | KNO; 1; 4 | KNO; 2; 7 | SNE; 1; 5 | SNE; 2; 5 | **THR**; **1** Ret | THR; 2; 7 | BRH; 1; 15 | BRH; 2; 1 | SIL; 1; 18 | SIL; 2; 7 | | | 4th | 137 |
| 1998 | Volvo S40 Racing | Volvo S40 | | **THR**; **1**; 1 | **THR**; **2**; 2* | SIL; 1; 5 | SIL; 2 Ret | **DON**; **1**; 3 | DON; 2; 7* | **BRH**; **1**; 1 | **BRH**; **2**; 1* | OUL; 1; 2 | OUL; 2; 2 | DON; 1; 2 | DON; 2 Ret | CRO; 1; 4 | CRO; 2; 1* | SNE; 1; 5 | SNE; 2; 2* | **THR**; **1**; 3 | THR; 2; 3* | KNO; 1 Ret | KNO; 2; 3 | BRH; 1; 3 | **BRH**; **2**; 1* | OUL; 1; 11 | OUL; 2; 4 | **SIL**; **1**; 2 | SIL; 2; 3 | **1st** | **254** |
| 1999 | Volvo S40 Racing | Volvo S40 | | DON; 1; 7 | DON; 2 Ret | SIL; 1; 3 | SIL; 2 Ret | **THR**; **1**; 2 | **THR**; **2**; 2* | BRH; 1 Ret | BRH; 2 Ret | OUL; 1; 7 | OUL; 2 Ret | DON; 1 Ret | DON; 2; 4 | CRO; 1; 4 | CRO; 2; 1* | SNE; 1; 2 | SNE; 2; 8 | **THR**; **1**; 2 | **THR**; **2** Ret* | KNO; 1; 6 | KNO; 2; 5 | BRH; 1; 1 | **BRH**; **2**; 5* | OUL; 1; 3 | OUL; 2; 3 | SIL; 1; 1 | SIL; 2; 1* | **3rd** | **192** |
| 2000 | Ford Team Mondeo | Ford Mondeo | S | BRH; 1 ovr:3 cls:3 | BRH; 2 ovr:4* cls:4 | **DON**; **1** ovr:2 cls:2 | **DON**; **2** ovr:3* cls:3 | THR; 1 ovr:4 cls:3 | THR; 2 Ret | KNO; 1 ovr:1 cls:1 | KNO; 2 ovr:2 cls:2 | OUL; 1 Ret | OUL; 2 Ret | **SIL**; **1** ovr:8 cls:8 | **SIL**; **2** DSQ | **CRO**; **1** ovr:1 cls:1 | **CRO**; **2** ovr:1* cls:1 | SNE; 1 ovr:3 cls:3 | **SNE**; **2** ovr:5 cls:5 | DON; 1 Ret | DON; 2 ovr:6 cls:6 | **BRH**; **1** ovr:3 cls:3 | BRH; 2 ovr:2 cls:2 | OUL; 1 Ret | OUL; 2 ovr:8 cls:8 | **SIL**; **1** ovr:2 cls:2 | SIL; 2 DNS | | | **3rd** | **178** |

=== Complete Swedish Touring Car Championship results ===
(key) (Races in bold indicate pole position) (Races in italics indicate fastest lap)

| Year | Team | Car | 1 | 2 | 3 | 4 | 5 | 6 | 7 | 8 | 9 | 10 | 11 | 12 | 13 | 14 | 15 | 16 | 17 | 18 | 19 | 20 | DC | Points |
|---|---|---|---|---|---|---|---|---|---|---|---|---|---|---|---|---|---|---|---|---|---|---|---|---|
| 2001 | Flash Engineering | Volvo S40 | FAL; 1 | FAL; 2 | MAN; 1 | MAN; 2 | KAR; 1 | KAR; 2 | JYL; 1 | JYL; 2 | FAL; 1 | FAL; 2 | KNU; 1 | KNU; 2 | MOI; 1 | MOI; 2 | KAR; 1 | KAR; 2 | KNU; 1 | KNU; 2 | MAN; 1; 16 | MAN; 2; 3 | 15th | 20 |
| 2004 | SEAT Sport | SEAT Toledo | KNU; 1 | KNU; 2 | FAL; 1 | FAL; 2 | KAR; 1 | KAR; 2 | MAN; 1; 5 | MAN; 2; 1 | KNU; 1 | KNU; 2 | KNU; 1 | KNU; 2 | ARC; 1 | ARC; 2 | KAR; 1 | KAR; 2 | MAN; 1 | MAN; 2 | | | 15th | 26 |

=== Complete European Touring Car Championship results ===
(key) (Races in bold indicate pole position) (Races in italics indicate fastest lap)

| Year | Team | Car | 1 | 2 | 3 | 4 | 5 | 6 | 7 | 8 | 9 | 10 | 11 | 12 | 13 | 14 | 15 | 16 | 17 | 18 | 19 | 20 | DC | Pts |
|---|---|---|---|---|---|---|---|---|---|---|---|---|---|---|---|---|---|---|---|---|---|---|---|---|
| 2002 | Volvo S60 Racing Team | Volvo S60 | MAG; 1; 4 | MAG; 2; 4 | SIL; 1; 4 | SIL; 2; 3 | BRN; 1 Ret | BRN; 2; 6 | JAR; 1; 10 | JAR; 2; 14† | AND; 1; 3 | AND; 2; 2 | OSC; 1; 3 | OSC; 2; 3 | SPA; 1; 4 | SPA; 2; 2 | PER; 1; 10 | PER; 2; 11 | DON; 1; 2 | DON; 2 Ret | **EST**; **1**; 2 | EST; 2; 4 | 5th | 56 |
| 2003 | ART Engineering | Volvo S60 | VAL; 1; 18† | VAL; 2; 10 | MAG; 1 Ret | MAG; 2 Ret | PER; 1; 14 | PER; 2 Ret | BRN; 1 Ret | BRN; 2; 9 | DON; 1; 5 | DON; 2; 3 | SPA; 1; 11 | SPA; 2 Ret | AND; 1; 7 | AND; 2; 3 | OSC; 1; 12 | OSC; 2; 13 | EST; 1 Ret | EST; 2 DNS | MNZ; 1 | MNZ; 2 | 11th | 18 |
| 2004 | SEAT Sport | SEAT Toledo Cupra | MNZ; 1; 10 | MNZ; 2; 10 | VAL; 1 Ret | VAL; 2 Ret | MAG; 1 Ret | MAG; 2 DNS | HOC; 1; 8 | HOC; 2; 5 | **BRN**; **1**; 2 | BRN; 2; 12 | DON; 1; 22 | DON; 2; 19 | SPA; 1 Ret | SPA; 2; 11 | IMO; 1; 11 | IMO; 2; 5 | OSC; 1; 7 | OSC; 2; 1 | DUB; 1; 15 | DUB; 2 DNS | 10th | 29 |

=== Complete V8 Supercar Championship results ===
| Year | Team | Car | 1 | 2 | 3 | 4 | 5 | 6 | 7 | 8 | 9 | 10 | 11 | 12 | 13 | Final pos | Points |
|---|---|---|---|---|---|---|---|---|---|---|---|---|---|---|---|---|---|
| 2003 | Triple Eight Race Engineering | Ford Falcon BA | ADL | PHI | ECK | WIN | PTH | HDV | QLD | ORP | SAN; 7 | BAT; 7 | SUR | PUK | ECK | 39th | 168 |

=== Complete World Touring Car Championship results ===
(key) (Races in bold indicate pole position) (Races in italics indicate fastest lap)

| Year | Team | Car | 1 | 2 | 3 | 4 | 5 | 6 | 7 | 8 | 9 | 10 | 11 | 12 | 13 | 14 | 15 | 16 | 17 | 18 | 19 | 20 | 21 | 22 | 23 | 24 | DC | Points |
|---|---|---|---|---|---|---|---|---|---|---|---|---|---|---|---|---|---|---|---|---|---|---|---|---|---|---|---|---|
| 2005 | SEAT Sport | SEAT Toledo Cupra | ITA; 1; 8 | ITA; 2 Ret | FRA; 1; 3 | FRA; 2; 11 | GBR; 1; 7 | GBR; 2; 1 | SMR; 1; 9 | SMR; 2; 4 | MEX; 1; 3 | MEX; 2; 6 | BEL; 1; 11 | BEL; 2 Ret | GER; 1; 2 | GER; 2; 7 | TUR; 1; 5 | TUR; 2; 7 | | | | | | | | | 6th | 57 |
| 2005 | SEAT Sport | SEAT León | | | | | | | | | | | | | | | | | ESP; 1 Ret | ESP; 2; 11 | MAC; 1; 3 | MAC; 2; 7 | | | | | 6th | 57 |
| 2006 | SEAT Sport | SEAT León | ITA; 1; 6 | ITA; 2; 22 | FRA; 1; 3 | FRA; 2 Ret | **GBR**; **1**; 5 | GBR; 2; 2 | GER; 1; 3 | GER; 2; 5 | BRA; 1; 6 | BRA; 2 Ret | MEX; 1; 8 | MEX; 2; 3 | CZE; 1 Ret | CZE; 2 DNS | **TUR**; **1**; 2 | TUR; 2; 4 | ESP; 1; 23 | ESP; 2; 20 | MAC; 1; 16 | MAC; 2; 14 | | | | | 7th | 54 |
| 2007 | Chevrolet RML | Chevrolet Lacetti | BRA; 1 | BRA; 2 | NED; 1 | NED; 2 | ESP; 1 | ESP; 2 | FRA; 1 | FRA; 2 | CZE; 1 | CZE; 2 | POR; 1 | POR; 2 | SWE; 1; 9 | SWE; 2; 1 | GER; 1 | GER; 2 | GBR; 1 | GBR; 2 | ITA; 1 | ITA; 2 | | | | | 16th | 13 |
| 2007 | SEAT Sport | SEAT León | | | | | | | | | | | | | | | | | | | | | MAC; 1; 11 | MAC; 2; 6 | | | 16th | 13 |
| 2008 | SEAT Sport | SEAT León TDI | BRA; 1; 2 | BRA; 2; 7 | MEX; 1; 2 | MEX; 2; 2 | ESP; 1; 10 | ESP; 2; 7 | FRA; 1; 6 | FRA; 2; 3 | CZE; 1; 10 | CZE; 2; 17 | POR; 1; 1 | POR; 2; 8 | GBR; 1; 11 | GBR; 2; 9 | GER; 1; 6 | GER; 2; 20 | **EUR**; **1**; 2 | EUR; 2; 6 | ITA; 1; 16 | ITA; 2; 19 | JPN; 1; 1 | JPN; 2; 9 | MAC; 1 Ret | MAC; 2; 4 | 5th | 77 |
| 2009 | SEAT Sport | SEAT León TDI | BRA; 1; 3 | BRA; 2; 2 | MEX; 1; 1 | MEX; 2; 3 | MAR; 1 Ret | MAR; 2 DNS | FRA; 1; 13 | FRA; 2 Ret | ESP; 1; 13 | ESP; 2; 14 | CZE; 1; 4 | CZE; 2; 6 | POR; 1; 7 | POR; 2; 3 | GBR; 1; 5 | GBR; 2; 4 | GER; 1; 3 | GER; 2; 11 | ITA; 1 NC | ITA; 2; 7 | JPN; 1; 25 | JPN; 2; 8 | MAC; 1; 11 | MAC; 2; 10 | 7th | 64 |
| 2012 | Chevrolet Motorsport Sweden | Chevrolet Cruze 1.6T | ITA; 1; 4 | ITA; 2; 10 | ESP; 1 | ESP; 2 | MAR; 1 | MAR; 2 | SVK; 1 | SVK; 2 | HUN; 1 | HUN; 2 | AUT; 1 | AUT; 2 | POR; 1 | POR; 2 | BRA; 1 | BRA; 2 | USA; 1 | USA; 2 | JPN; 1 | JPN; 2 | CHN; 1 | CHN; 2 | MAC; 1 | MAC; 2 | 19th | 14 |
| 2013 | NIKA Racing | Chevrolet Cruze 1.6T | ITA; 1 | ITA; 2 | MAR; 1 | MAR; 2 | SVK; 1 | SVK; 2 | HUN; 1 | HUN; 2 | AUT; 1 | AUT; 2 | RUS; 1 | RUS; 2 | POR; 1 | POR; 2 | ARG; 1 | ARG; 2 | USA; 1 | USA; 2 | JPN; 1 | JPN; 2 | CHN; 1; 14 | CHN; 2; 29† | MAC; 1 | MAC; 2 | NC | 0 |
| 2015 | Nika International | Honda Civic WTCC | ARG; 1; 10 | ARG; 2; 9 | MAR; 1 | MAR; 2 | HUN; 1 | HUN; 2 | GER; 1 | GER; 2 | RUS; 1; 13 | RUS; 2; 11 | SVK; 1 | SVK; 2 | FRA; 1; 11 | FRA; 2; 10 | POR; 1 | POR; 2 | JPN; 1 | JPN; 2 | CHN; 1 | CHN; 2 | THA; 1 | THA; 2 | QAT; 1 | QAT; 2 | 21st | 4 |

=== Complete Scandinavian Touring Car Championship results ===
(key) (Races in bold indicate pole position) (Races in italics indicate fastest lap)

| Year | Team | Car | 1 | 2 | 3 | 4 | 5 | 6 | 7 | 8 | 9 | 10 | 11 | 12 | 13 | 14 | 15 | 16 | 17 | 18 | DC | Points |
|---|---|---|---|---|---|---|---|---|---|---|---|---|---|---|---|---|---|---|---|---|---|---|
| 2011 | Chevrolet Motorsport Sweden | Chevrolet Cruze | JYL; 1; 4 | JYL; 2; 5 | KNU; 1; 3 | KNU; 2 Ret | MAN; 1; 2 | MAN; 2; 4 | **GÖT**; **1**; 1 | GÖT; 2; 5 | FAL; 1; 3 | FAL; 2; 5 | KAR; 1; 5 | KAR; 2; 4 | JYL; 1 Ret | JYL; 2; 5 | **KNU**; **1**; 1 | KNU; 2; 6 | **MAN**; **1**; 1 | MAN; 2; 4 | **1st** | **229** |
| 2012 | Chevrolet Motorsport Sweden | Chevrolet Cruze | MAN; 1; 2 | MAN; 2; 2 | **KNU**; **1**; 1 | KNU; 2; 2 | STU; 1; 5 | STU; 2; 3 | MAN; 1; 2 | MAN; 2; 3 | ÖST; 1; 3 | ÖST; 2; 4 | JYL; 1; 2 | JYL; 2; 4 | KNU; 1; 3 | KNU; 2; 1 | SOL; 1; 4 | SOL; 2; 4 | | | **2nd** | **258** |

=== Complete Bathurst 1000 results ===
| Year | Team | Co-drivers | Car | Laps | Pos. |
|---|---|---|---|---|---|
| 1997* | (Australia) Volvo Dealer Racing | (New Zealand) Jim Richards | Volvo 850 | 159 | 4th |
| 1998* | (Australia) Volvo S40 Racing | (New Zealand) Jim Richards | Volvo S40 | 161 | **1st** |
| 2003 | (Australia) Triple Eight Race Engineering | (New Zealand) Paul Radisich | Ford Falcon BA | 161 | 7th |

* Super Touring race

Awards and achievements
| Preceded by Alain Menu | Autosport; National Racing Driver of the Year; 1998 | Succeeded by Laurent Aïello |
Sporting positions
| Preceded by David Coulthard | Macau Grand Prix; Winner; 1992 | Succeeded by Jörg Müller |
| Preceded by Alain Menu | British Touring Car Champion; 1998 | Succeeded by Laurent Aïello |
| Preceded by David Brabham; Geoff Brabham | Winner of the Bathurst 1000; 1998 (with Jim Richards) | Succeeded by Steven Richards; Greg Murphy |
| Preceded by Robert Dahlgren (Scandinavian Touring Car Cup) | Scandinavian Touring Car Championship; Champion; 2011 | Succeeded by Johan Kristoffersson |
