= W. J. B. Riddell =

Scottish ophthalmologist

William John Brownlow Riddell FRSE FRCPG DOMS (1899–1976) was a Scottish ophthalmologist.

== Life ==
He was born on 11 February 1899 the son of Dr Brownlow Riddell, an ophthalmic surgeon. The family lived at 22 Newton Place in the Charing Cross district near Kelvingrove Park in west Glasgow. William was educated at Glasgow Academy then studied medicine at Glasgow University, matriculating in 1916.

He abandoned his studies due to the First World War, and served as a midshipman in the Royal Navy. He returned to studies in 1919 and graduated MB ChB in 1923.

In 1941 he was appointed professor of ophthalmology at Glasgow University. In 1942 he was elected a Fellow of the Royal Society of Edinburgh. His proposers were Edward Hindle, Edward Provan Cathcart, John Walton and George Walter Tyrrell.

He was president of the Scottish Ophthalmological Society, and of the Society for the Blind in Glasgow. In 1946 he gave the Howe Lecture at Harvard University.

In the Second World War he investigated the harmful effects of chemical agents on the eye.

He retired in 1964 and died in Australia on 18 February 1976 aged 77.

== Family ==
In 1932 he married Anna Elinor Ferguson.

== Publications ==
- Research in Ophthalmology (1944)
- Eyes in Industry (1951)
- The History of the Glasgow Ophthalmological Society, 1868-1968 (1968)
- An Anthology of Ophthalmic Classics (1970)
