= John Filippi =

French auto racing driver

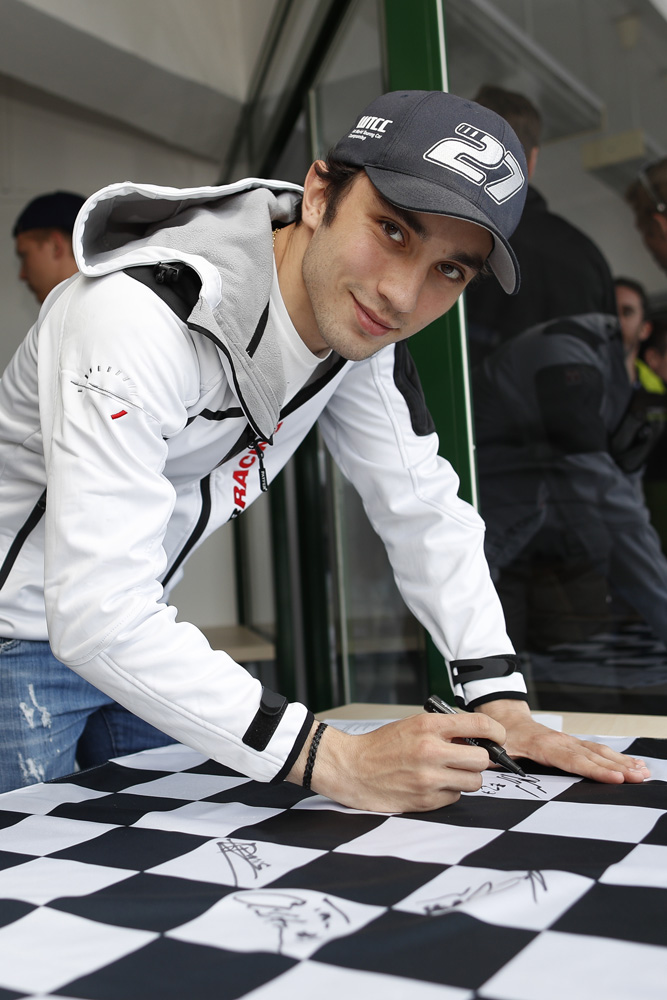
- Filippi in 2017
- Nationality: (France) French
- Born: February 27, 1995 (age 31) Bastia, France

World Touring Car Championship career
- Debut season: 2014
- Current team: Sébastien Loeb Racing
- Car number: 27
- Former teams: Campos Racing
- Starts: 89
- Wins: 0
- Poles: 0
- Fastest laps: 0
- Best finish: 12th in 2017

Previous series
- 2013 2012-2013 2007-2012: Eurocup Formula Renault 2.0; Single-seater V de V Challenge; Karting

Championship titles
- 2013: Single-seater V de V Challenge

John Filippi (born 27 February 1995) is a French auto racing driver who competes in the TCR Europe Touring Car Series for Sébastien Loeb Racing.

== Racing career ==
=== Karting ===
Filippi started his karting career in 2007 in the Cadet class. He made his first international appearance in 2009. In 2009, Filippi competed in the European KF3 championship where he finished 40th in a Vortex powered Tony Kart. He also competed in the French Grand Prix Open Karting. The following two years, he competed in the KF2 class. He ended the 2011 season with two top-ten classifications in the French and Grand Prix Open championships.

=== Single-seaters ===
After six years of karting, Filippi made is autoracing debut in 2007 at Circuit Paul Armagnac. He was entered by Equipe Palmyr in the amateur Single-seater V de V Challenge driving a Tatuus FR2000. Driving against other old Formula Renault and Formula Master cars he finished twelfth in his first race. He raced six races in his inaugural racing season and finished 25th in the standings.

The following season, Filippi switched to the Bossy Racing team racing a Tatuus N.T07 Formula Master chassis. He won the first three races of the season at Circuit de Barcelona-Catalunya. He went on to win eleven of the eighteen races in the season. Besides the three races he won in Barcelona, Filippi won two races in Motorland Aragón, three races at Lédenon and three races at Magny-Cours. Towards the end of the racing season, he made his debut in the Eurocup Formula Renault 2.0 with RC Formula. At Circuit de Barcelona-Catalunya, he finished 22nd in the first and 27th in the second race.

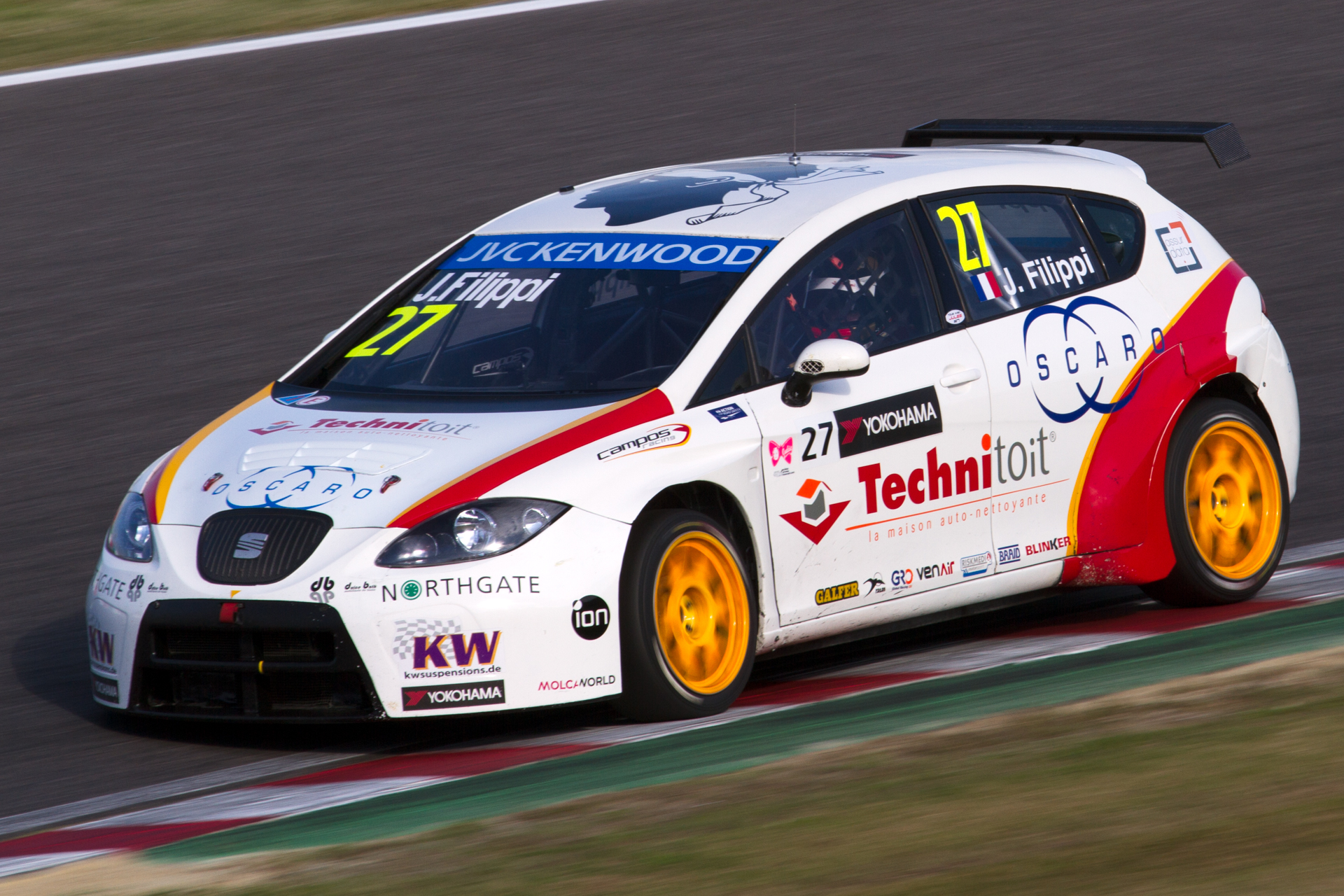
Filippi competing in the 2014 World Touring Car Championship.

=== World Touring Car Championship ===
==== 2014 ====
On March 19, 2014, it was announced that Filippi would race in the World Touring Car Championship. Filippi joined Campos Racing driving one of their TC2 SEAT León's.

Filippi became the youngest ever points scorer in a WTCC race at the Race of Morocco in Marrakech. This was followed by consistent pace in the TC2 class all season before clinching a class win at the Race of Japan.

==== 2015 ====
For 2015, with the departure of Dušan Borković from Campos Racing, Filippi was promoted to the TC1 Chevrolet Cruze for the 2015 season.

Again, Filippi scored points to finish in Marrakech and at the Nordschleife. At the Race of China, Filippi set a new career-best qualifying position with seventh, before suffering from an accident in Race 1 which forced him to retire. In Thailand, it was much the same story with a strong qualifying but a Race 1 incident with Tiago Monteiro forced him to retire once again.

At the Race of Qatar, Fillipi qualified tenth and therefore lined up on pole position for Race 2. Filippi is currently the youngest driver ever to have started from pole position in a WTCC race at 20 years and 331 days old.

==== 2016 ====
On February 9, 2016, Filippi's main sponsor Oscaro announced that Filippi would be continuing with Campos Racing in the TC1 Chevrolet for the 2016 World Touring Car Championship season. It was also announced that 4-time world champion Yvan Muller would be accompanying Filippi as a driver coach for the season.

== Racing record ==
=== Career summary ===
Season	Series	Team	Races	Wins	Poles	F/Laps	Podiums	Points	Position
2013	V de V Challenge Monoplace	Bossy Racing Team	18	11	5	10	16	637.5	**1st**
2013	Eurocup Formula Renault 2.0	RC Formula	2	0	0	0	0	0	NC†
2014	World Touring Car Championship	Campos Racing	23	0	0	0	0	4	18th
2015	World Touring Car Championship	Campos Racing	24	0	0	0	0	6	18th
2016	World Touring Car Championship	Campos Racing	22	0	0	0	0	9	18th
2017	World Touring Car Championship	Sébastien Loeb Racing	20	0	0	0	0	48	12th
2017	Touring Car Endurance Series - TCR	Pit Lane Competizioni	4	0	0	0	1	28	**2nd**
2018	World Touring Car Cup	Team Oscaro by Campos Racing	29	0	0	0	0	14	26th
2019	TCR Europe Touring Car Series	Vuković Motorsport	8	0	0	0	0	15	31st
2019	TCR Europe Touring Car Series	PCR Sport	4	0	0	0	0	15	31st
2019	FIA Motorsport Games Touring Car Cup	Team France	2	0	0	0	0	22	4th
2020	TCR Europe Touring Car Series	Target Competition	12	1	1	2	3	257	**2nd**
2021	Pure ETCR Championship	Hyundai Motorsport N	5	0	0	0	0	177	10th
2022	TCR Europe Touring Car Series	Sébastien Loeb Racing Bardhal Team	13	1	1	0	1	202	10th
2023	TCR Europe Touring Car Series	Comtoyou Racing	14	3	1	0	8	441	**2nd**
2023	TCR World Tour	Comtoyou Racing	8	1	0	0	1	92	11th
2023	TCR World Tour	Audi Sport Team Comtoyou	2	0	0	0	0	92	11th
2024	TCR World Tour	Volcano Motorsport	13	0	0	0	0	113	11th
2024	TCR Italy Touring Car Championship	Volcano Motorsport	2	0	0	0	0	0	NC†
2024	TCR South America Touring Car Championship	Volcano Motorsport	3	0	0	0	0	31	32nd
2025	TCR World Tour	SP Competition	8	0	0	0	0	56	14th

^{†} As Filippi was a guest driver, he was ineligible to score points.

=== Complete Eurocup Formula Renault 2.0 results ===
(key) (Races in bold indicate pole position; races in italics indicate fastest lap)

Year	Entrant	1	2	3	4	5	6	7	8	9	10	11	12	13	14	DC	Points
2013	RC Formula	ALC; 1	ALC; 2	SPA; 1	SPA; 2	MSC; 1	MSC; 2	RBR; 1	RBR; 2	HUN; 1	HUN; 2	LEC; 1	LEC; 2	CAT; 1; 22	CAT; 2; 27	NC†	0

† As Filippi was a guest driver, he was ineligible for points

=== Complete World Touring Car Championship results ===
(key) (Races in bold indicate pole position) (Races in italics indicate fastest lap)

Year	Team	Car	1	2	3	4	5	6	7	8	9	10	11	12	13	14	15	16	17	18	19	20	21	22	23	24	DC	Points
2014	Campos Racing	SEAT León WTCC	MAR; 1; 14	MAR; 2; 8	FRA; 1; 18	FRA; 2 Ret	HUN; 1; 17	HUN; 2; 17	SVK; 1; 19	SVK; 2 C	AUT; 1; 16	AUT; 2; 13	RUS; 1; 18	RUS; 2; 15	BEL; 1; 19	BEL; 2; 19	ARG; 1; 16	ARG; 2; 16†	BEI; 1; 13	BEI; 2; 15	CHN; 1; 14	CHN; 2; 15	JPN; 1; 16	JPN; 2; 14	MAC; 1; 16	MAC; 2; 12	18th	4
2015	Campos Racing	Chevrolet RML Cruze TC1	ARG; 1 Ret	ARG; 2; 12	MAR; 1; 13	MAR; 2; 8	HUN; 1; 13	HUN; 2; 11	GER; 1; 12	GER; 2; 10	RUS; 1 NC	RUS; 2; 15	SVK; 1; 12	SVK; 2; 14	FRA; 1; 15	FRA; 2; 13	POR; 1; 15	POR; 2; 14	JPN; 1; 13	JPN; 2; 11	CHN; 1 NC	CHN; 2; 10	THA; 1 Ret	THA; 2; 11	QAT; 1; 14	**QAT**; **2**; 15	18th	6
2016	Campos Racing	Chevrolet RML Cruze TC1	FRA; 1; 12	FRA; 2; 12	SVK; 1; 14	SVK; 2; 10	HUN; 1; 8	HUN; 2; 12	MAR; 1 Ret	MAR; 2; 9	GER; 1 Ret	GER; 2; 12	RUS; 1; 11	RUS; 2; 14	POR; 1; 15	POR; 2; 14	ARG; 1; 10	ARG; 2; 10	JPN; 1; 14	JPN; 2; 16	**CHN**; **1** Ret	CHN; 2; 15	QAT; 1; 14	QAT; 2; 13			18th	9
2017	Sébastien Loeb Racing	Citroën C-Elysée WTCC	MAR; 1 NC	MAR; 2; 11	ITA; 1; 7	ITA; 2; 10	**HUN**; **1**; 14†	HUN; 2; 11	GER; 1; 10	GER; 2; 10	POR; 1; 10	POR; 2; 10	ARG; 1; 8	ARG; 2; 12	CHN; 1; 4	CHN; 2; 6‡	JPN; 1; 12	JPN; 2; 9	MAC; 1; 11	MAC; 2; 16	QAT; 1; 4	QAT; 2; 9					12th	48

^{†} Did not finish the race, but was classified as he completed over 90% of the race distance. ^{‡} Half points awarded as less than 75% of race distance was completed.

=== Complete World Touring Car Cup results ===
(key) (Races in bold indicate pole position) (Races in italics indicate fastest lap)

Year	Team	Car	1	2	3	4	5	6	7	8	9	10	11	12	13	14	15	16	17	18	19	20	21	22	23	24	25	26	27	28	29	30	DC	Points
2018	Team Oscaro by Campos Racing	Cupra León TCR	MAR; 1; 10	MAR; 2; 17	MAR; 3; 11	HUN; 1 Ret	HUN; 2; 13	HUN; 3 Ret	GER; 1; 16	GER; 2 NC	GER; 3; 20	NED; 1; 15	NED; 2; 10	NED; 3; 14	POR; 1 Ret	POR; 2; 12	POR; 3; 16	SVK; 1; 18	SVK; 2; 5	SVK; 3 Ret	CHN; 1 Ret	CHN; 2 Ret	CHN; 3; 20	WUH; 1; 16	WUH; 2 Ret	WUH; 3 DNS	JPN; 1; 20	JPN; 2; 22†	JPN; 3; 12	MAC; 1 Ret	MAC; 2; 11	MAC; 3; 23†	26th	14

^{†} Driver did not finish the race, but was classified as he completed over 90% of the race distance.

=== Complete TCR Europe Touring Car Series results ===
(key) (Races in bold indicate pole position) (Races in italics indicate fastest lap)

Year	Team	Car	1	2	3	4	5	6	7	8	9	10	11	12	13	14	DC	Points
2019	Vuković Motorsport	Renault Mégane R.S TCR	HUN; 1; 13	HUN; 2 Ret	HOC; 1; 15	HOC; 2; 18	SPA; 1; 22	SPA; 2; 17	RBR; 1 Ret	RBR; 2 Ret	OSC; 1 WD	OSC; 2 WD					31st	15
2019	PCR Sport	CUPRA León TCR											CAT; 1; 27†	CAT; 2 Ret	MNZ; 1; 11	MNZ; 2; 17	31st	15
2020	Target Competition	Hyundai i30 N TCR	**LEC**; **1**; 3^{1}	LEC; 2; 7	ZOL; 1; 12	ZOL; 2; 9	MNZ; 1; 5^{10}	MNZ; 2; 9	CAT; 1; 8^{8}	CAT; 2; 10	SPA; 1; 5^{3}	SPA; 2; 3	JAR; 1; 11^{10}	JAR; 2; 1			2nd	257
2022	Sébastien Loeb Racing	CUPRA León Competición TCR	ALG; 1; 10	ALG; 2; 4	LEC; 1; 4	LEC; 2; 6	SPA; 1; 12	SPA; 2; 15	NOR; 1; 7	NOR; 2; 10	NÜR; 1; 9	NÜR; 2 C	**MNZ**; **1**; 1	MNZ; 2; 22	CAT; 1; 11	CAT; 2 Ret	10th	202
2023	Comtoyou Racing	Audi RS 3 LMS TCR	ALG; 1; 9^{3}	ALG; 2; 9	PAU; 1; 7	PAU; 2; 3	SPA; 1; 10^{4}	SPA; 2; 1	HUN; 1; 14^{6}	HUN; 2; 14	**LEC**; **1**; 1^{1}	LEC; 2; 6	MNZ; 1; 5^{5}	MNZ; 2; 5	CAT; 1; 3^{3}	CAT; 2; 2	2nd	441

^{†} Driver did not finish the race, but was classified as he completed over 90% of the race distance.

=== Complete TCR World Tour results ===
(key) (Races in bold indicate pole position) (Races in italics indicate fastest lap)

Year	Team	Car	1	2	3	4	5	6	7	8	9	10	11	12	13	14	15	16	17	18	19	20	21	DC	Points
2023	Comtoyou Racing	Audi RS 3 LMS TCR	ALG; 1; 9	ALG; 2; 9	SPA; 1; 10	SPA; 2; 1	VAL; 1; 10	VAL; 2 Ret	HUN; 1; 14	HUN; 2; 14	ELP; 1	ELP; 2	VIL; 1	VIL; 2	SYD; 1	SYD; 2	SYD; 3	BAT; 1	BAT; 2	BAT; 3				11th	92
2023	Audi Sport Team Comtoyou	Audi RS 3 LMS TCR																			MAC; 1; 10	MAC; 2; 7		11th	92
2024	Volcano Motorsport	Audi RS 3 LMS TCR	VAL; 1; 9	VAL; 2; 7	MRK; 1; 6	MRK; 2; 4	MOH; 1; 8	MOH; 2; 9	SAP; 1 Ret	SAP; 2; 7	ELP; 1 DNS	ELP; 2; 9	ZHZ; 1; 24	ZHZ; 2 Ret	MAC; 1 Ret	MAC; 2; 13								11th	113
2025	SP Competition	Cupra León VZ TCR	AHR; 1; 12	AHR; 2; 10	AHR; 3; 9	CRT; 1; 10	CRT; 2; 4	CRT; 3; 11	MNZ; 1 Ret	MNZ; 2 Ret	CVR; 1 WD	CVR; 2 WD	BEN; 1	BEN; 2	BEN; 3	INJ; 1	INJ; 2	INJ; 3	ZHZ; 1	ZHZ; 2	ZHZ; 3	MAC; 1	MAC; 2	14th	56
