= 2014 FIA WTCC Race of France =

Race details
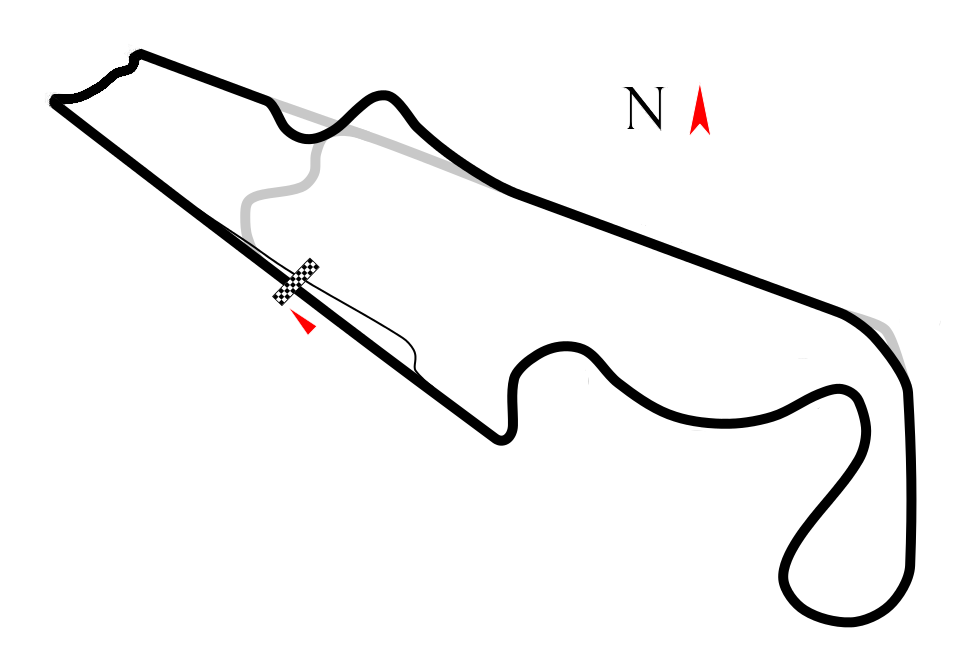
- Round 2 of 12 in the 2014 World Touring Car Championship at Circuit Paul Ricard in Le Castellet, France.
- Date: 20 April, 2014
- Location: Le Castellet, France
- Course: Circuit Paul Ricard; 3.841 kilometres (2.387 mi)

Race One
- Laps: 16
Pole position
Driver		(France) Yvan Muller	Citroën Total WTCC
Time		1:29.857	
Podium
First		(France) Yvan Muller	Citroën Total WTCC
Second		(France) Sébastien Loeb	Citroën Total WTCC
Third		(Italy) Gabriele Tarquini	Castrol Honda Team
Fastest Lap
Driver		(France) Yvan Muller	Citroën Total WTCC
Time		1:43.675	

Race Two
- Laps: 18
Podium
First		(Argentina) José María López	Citroën Total WTCC
Second		(France) Yvan Muller	Citroën Total WTCC
Third		(Portugal) Tiago Monteiro	Castrol Honda Team
Fastest Lap
Driver		(Argentina) José María López	Citroën Total WTCC
Time		1:31.468	

The 2014 FIA WTCC Race of France (formally the FIA WTCC JVC Kenwood Race of France) was the second round of the 2014 World Touring Car Championship season and the sixth running of the FIA WTCC Race of France. It was held on 20 April 2014 at the Circuit Paul Ricard in Le Castellet, France.

Both races were won by Citroën Total WTCC, reigning champion Yvan Muller won race one and José María López won race two.

== Background ==
After the opening round of the season, José María López was leading the drivers' championship by one point over of teammate Sébastien Loeb. Franz Engstler was leading the Yokohama Trophy for drivers in TC2 specification cars.

After a crash in race two caused significant damage to his car, Tom Coronel missed the French round while his Chevrolet RML Cruze TC1 was repaired. Mehdi Bennani came into the weekend with a three–place grid penalty for race one having been deemed to have caused the collision.

== Report ==
=== Testing and free practice ===
López led a Citroën 1–2 in Friday testing, he headed Loeb and the Zengő Motorsport Honda of Norbert Michelisz.

Loeb headed Campos Racing's Hugo Valente in free practice one on Saturday. The session was interrupted when Yvan Muller collided with a tyre stack and damaged his Citroën C-Elysée WTCC.

Valente was quickest in the second practice session with Tom Chilton in second making it a Chevrolet 1–2.

=== Qualifying ===
Muller was quickest in the first part of qualifying while the Lukoil Lada Sport drivers all missed out, as Mikhail Kozlovskiy suffered a steering arm issue, James Thompson stopped on the circuit and Robert Huff narrowly missed out on a Q2 place to Tiago Monteiro.

Muller set the pace once again in the second part of qualifying ahead of his Citroën team mates. Gabriele Tarquini in fifth put a Honda through to Q3 for the first time this season.

In the Q3 shoot–out it was Loeb who came out on top to claim his first WTCC pole position with López and Muller second and third. Tarquini was fourth ahead of the Chevrolet of Valente.

Loeb and López were later excluded from qualifying due to an error with their automatic fuel cut-off systems. They would start at the back for both races with Muller gaining pole position for race one and Mehdi Bennani promoted to pole for race two.

=== Race One ===
The race began on a damp track, Muller got a slow start and was passed by Tarquini and Michelisz before the first corner. Muller regained the lead on lap three while Valente was under pressure from Huff who had put himself up to fifth place with a good start. By lap three Loeb had worked his way up to sixth place and the Frenchman made the move at the start of lap four. Loeb then took fourth from Valente and Huff followed him through to demote Valente again. Loeb had eventually fought his way up to third behind Tarquini while López was delayed by the Lada of Huff who he finally cleared on lap seven. On lap ten Michelisz came together with López, sending the Citroën sideways although neither car sustained damage and they continued in fourth and fifth. After a number of laps fighting over second place, Tarquini made a mistake over one of the kerbs and this allowed Loeb to close in and pass the Honda. Further back Valente tried a pass up the inside of Huff although the Chevrolet lost grip and had a near-miss with Huff and Michelisz. Shortly after Huff and Valente moved up to fifth and sixth at the expense of Michelisz. Muller claimed his first win of the season with Loeb second and Tarquini on degrading tyres third. Engstler finished 16th and was the Yokohama Trophy winner.

=== Race Two ===
Monteiro leapt ahead of Bennani at the start, Morbidelli was spun around further back in the pack by Chilton. At the end of lap two Muller and Loeb collided as Muller tried to go up the inside of his teammate. On lap five Tarquini passed Bennani to move up to second behind Monteiro who had put a gap between himself and the rest of the field. Both López and Muller then moved up ahead of Bennani in their pursuit of the factory Hondas. On lap seven Tarquini made a mistake at the chicane which allowed López and Muller through. At this point Loeb took out one of the tyre stacks while attempting a pass on Dušan Borković and the debris on the track led to the safety car being brought out. The race was restarted on lap 10, Monteiro defended from López immediately as the Citroën tried to go around the outside at the first corner. This opened the door for Muller to try to pass López for second place. At the back of the field John Filippi collided with Engstler which brought out the safety car for a second time, Chilton meanwhile was issued with a drive–through penalty for causing the collision with Morbidelli on the opening lap. The race resumed on lap 12, Loeb tried to pass Borković at the first corner and the pair came together with Loeb being pushed into a half spin. On lap 14 López passed Monteiro to take the lead, Muller followed through and took part of Monteiro's front bumper off as he went through. On lap 17 Valente drifted wide allowing Huff to have a look, the pair touched with Valente going wide and Morbidelli behind saw an opportunity to pass and move himself up to ninth place. Loeb had passed Borković after a number of laps and was now looking to catch Bennani, he had a lunge at the first corner. At the front López led Muller home at the checkered flag with Monteiro taking the final podium spot. Engstler took the Yokohama Trophy victory once again.

== Results ==
=== Qualifying ===
Pos.	No.	Name	Team	Car	C	Q1	Q2	Q3	Points
1	1	(France) Yvan Muller	Citroën Total WTCC	Citroën C-Elysée WTCC	TC1	1:30.269	1:29.566	1:29.857	**5**
2	2	(Italy) Gabriele Tarquini	Castrol Honda World Touring Car Team	Honda Civic WTCC	TC1	1:31.198	1:30.741	1:30.808	**4**
3	7	(France) Hugo Valente	Campos Racing	Chevrolet RML Cruze TC1	TC1	1:30.644	1:30.451	1:31.139	**3**
4	5	(Hungary) Norbert Michelisz	Zengő Motorsport	Honda Civic WTCC	TC1	1:31.110	1:30.751		**2**
5	3	(United Kingdom) Tom Chilton	ROAL Motorsport	Chevrolet RML Cruze TC1	TC1	1:30.932	1:30.897		**1**
6	98	(Serbia) Dušan Borković	Campos Racing	Chevrolet RML Cruze TC1	TC1	1:31.568	1:31.099		
7	10	(Italy) Gianni Morbidelli	ALL-INKL.COM Münnich Motorsport	Chevrolet RML Cruze TC1	TC1	1:31.042	1:31.207		
8	18	(Portugal) Tiago Monteiro	Castrol Honda World Touring Car Team	Honda Civic WTCC	TC1	1:31.693	1:31.224		
9	77	(Germany) René Münnich	ALL-INKL.COM Münnich Motorsport	Chevrolet RML Cruze TC1	TC1	1:31.239	1:31.345		
10	25	(Morocco) **Mehdi Bennani**	Proteam Racing	Honda Civic WTCC	TC1	1:31.487	1:32.458		
11	12	(United Kingdom) Robert Huff	Lukoil Lada Sport	Lada Granta 1.6T	TC1	1:32.142			
12	11	(United Kingdom) James Thompson	Lukoil Lada Sport	Lada Granta 1.6T	TC1	1:33.162			
13	14	(Russia) Mikhail Kozlovskiy	Lukoil Lada Sport	Lada Granta 1.6T	TC1	1:34.210			
14	27	(France) John Filippi	Campos Racing	SEAT León WTCC	TC2T	1:35.972			
15	6	(Germany) Franz Engstler	Liqui Moly Team Engstler	BMW 320 TC	TC2T	1:36.022			
16	8	(Italy) Pasquale Di Sabatino	Liqui Moly Team Engstler	BMW 320 TC	TC2T	1:36.083			
107% time: 1:36.587
EX^{1}	9	(France) Sébastien Loeb	Citroën Total WTCC	Citroën C-Elysée WTCC	TC1	Excluded			
EX^{1}	37	(Argentina) José María López	Citroën Total WTCC	Citroën C-Elysée WTCC	TC1	Excluded			

- **Bold** denotes Pole position for second race.

^1 — Loeb and López were excluded from qualifying after their automatic fuel cut-off systems were found not to be working during scrutineering.

=== Race 1 ===
Pos.	No.	Name	Team	Car	C	Laps	Time/Retired	Grid	Points
1	1	(France) **Yvan Muller**	Citroën Total WTCC	Citroën C-Elysée WTCC	TC1	16	27:58.347	1	25
2	9	(France) Sébastien Loeb	Citroën Total WTCC	Citroën C-Elysée WTCC	TC1	16	+12.727	17	18
3	2	(Italy) Gabriele Tarquini	Castrol Honda World Touring Car Team	Honda Civic WTCC	TC1	16	+15.026	2	15
4	37	(Argentina) José María López	Citroën Total WTCC	Citroën C-Elysée WTCC	TC1	16	+18.663	18	12
5	12	(United Kingdom) Robert Huff	Lukoil Lada Sport	Lada Granta 1.6T	TC1	16	+31.393	10	10
6	7	(France) Hugo Valente	Campos Racing	Chevrolet RML Cruze TC1	TC1	16	+34.415	3	8
7	5	(Hungary) Norbert Michelisz	Zengő Motorsport	Honda Civic WTCC	TC1	16	+34.896	4	6
8	18	(Portugal) Tiago Monteiro	Castrol Honda World Touring Car Team	Honda Civic WTCC	TC1	16	+37.918	8	4
9	3	(United Kingdom) Tom Chilton	ROAL Motorsport	Chevrolet RML Cruze TC1	TC1	16	+41.014	5	2
10	11	(United Kingdom) James Thompson	Lukoil Lada Sport	Lada Granta 1.6T	TC1	16	+45.739	11	1
11	10	(Italy) Gianni Morbidelli	ALL-INKL.COM Münnich Motorsport	Chevrolet RML Cruze TC1	TC1	16	+48.720	7	
12	77	(Germany) René Münnich	ALL-INKL.COM Münnich Motorsport	Chevrolet RML Cruze TC1	TC1	16	+49.234	9	
13	25	(Morocco) Mehdi Bennani	Proteam Racing	Honda Civic WTCC	TC1	16	+57.136	13	
14	98	(Serbia) Dušan Borković	Campos Racing	Chevrolet RML Cruze TC1	TC1	16	+1:02.522	6	
15	14	(Russia) Mikhail Kozlovskiy	Lukoil Lada Sport	Lada Granta 1.6T	TC1	16	+1:05.813	12	
16	6	(Germany) Franz Engstler	Liqui Moly Team Engstler	BMW 320 TC	TC2T	16	+1:46.587	15	
17	8	(Italy) Pasquale Di Sabatino	Liqui Moly Team Engstler	BMW 320 TC	TC2T	15	+1 lap	16	
18	27	(France) John Filippi	Campos Racing	SEAT León WTCC	TC2T	15	+1 lap	14	

- **Bold** denotes Fastest lap.

=== Race 2 ===
Pos.	No.	Name	Team	Car	C	Laps	Time/Retired	Grid	Points
1	37	(Argentina) **José María López**	Citroën Total WTCC	Citroën C-Elysée WTCC	TC1	18	30:24.551	18	25
2	1	(France) Yvan Muller	Citroën Total WTCC	Citroën C-Elysée WTCC	TC1	18	+1.886	10	18
3	18	(Portugal) Tiago Monteiro	Castrol Honda World Touring Car Team	Honda Civic WTCC	TC1	18	+7.994	3	15
4	2	(Italy) Gabriele Tarquini	Castrol Honda World Touring Car Team	Honda Civic WTCC	TC1	18	+8.459	9	12
5	25	(Morocco) Mehdi Bennani	Proteam Racing	Honda Civic WTCC	TC1	18	+17.407	1	10
6	9	(France) Sébastien Loeb	Citroën Total WTCC	Citroën C-Elysée WTCC	TC1	18	+17.924	17	8
7	98	(Serbia) Dušan Borković	Campos Racing	Chevrolet RML Cruze TC1	TC1	18	+18.592	5	6
8	5	(Hungary) Norbert Michelisz	Zengő Motorsport	Honda Civic WTCC	TC1	18	+18.927	7	4
9	10	(Italy) Gianni Morbidelli	ALL-INKL.COM Münnich Motorsport	Chevrolet RML Cruze TC1	TC1	18	+20.531	4	2
10	7	(France) Hugo Valente	Campos Racing	Chevrolet RML Cruze TC1	TC1	18	+21.787	8	1
11	12	(United Kingdom) Robert Huff	Lukoil Lada Sport	Lada Granta 1.6T	TC1	18	+22.216	11	
12	77	(Germany) René Münnich	ALL-INKL.COM Münnich Motorsport	Chevrolet RML Cruze TC1	TC1	18	+23.391	2	
13	11	(United Kingdom) James Thompson	Lukoil Lada Sport	Lada Granta 1.6T	TC1	18	+25.800	12	
14	14	(Russia) Mikhail Kozlovskiy	Lukoil Lada Sport	Lada Granta 1.6T	TC1	18	+26.475	13	
15	3	(United Kingdom) Tom Chilton	ROAL Motorsport	Chevrolet RML Cruze TC1	TC1	18	+41.250	6	
16	6	(Germany) Franz Engstler	Liqui Moly Team Engstler	BMW 320 TC	TC2T	18	+44.222	15	
17	8	(Italy) Pasquale Di Sabatino	Liqui Moly Team Engstler	BMW 320 TC	TC2T	18	+46.048	16	
Ret	27	(France) John Filippi	Campos Racing	SEAT León WTCC	TC2T	9	Race incident	14	

- **Bold** denotes Fastest lap.

== Standings after the event ==
Drivers' Championship standings

	Pos	Driver	Points
	1	(Argentina) José María López	85
	2	(France) Sébastien Loeb	73
2	3	(France) Yvan Muller	65
	4	(Italy) Gabriele Tarquini	31
1	5	(France) Hugo Valente	31

Yokohama Trophy standings

Pos	Driver	Points
1	(Germany) Franz Engstler	45
2	(Italy) Pasquale Di Sabatino	30
3	(France) John Filippi	21

Manufacturers' Championship standings

Pos	Manufacturer	Points
1	(France) Citroën	186
2	(Japan) Honda	103
3	(Russia) Lada	75

- Note: Only the top five positions are included for both sets of drivers' standings.
