= 2014 FIA WTCC Race of Austria =

Race details
- Round 5 of 12 in the 2014 World Touring Car Championship at Salzburgring in Salzburg, Austria.
- Date: 25 May, 2014
- Location: Salzburg, Austria
- Course: Salzburgring; 4.241 kilometres (2.635 mi)

Race One
- Laps: 15
Pole position
Driver		(Italy) Gianni Morbidelli	Münnich Motorsport
Time		1:22.137	
Podium
First		(France) Yvan Muller	Citroën Total WTCC
Second		(Netherlands) Tom Coronel	ROAL Motorsport
Third		(Argentina) José María López	Citroën Total WTCC
Fastest Lap
Driver		(Argentina) José María López	Citroën Total WTCC
Time		1:22.571	

Race Two
- Laps: 17
Podium
First		(Argentina) José María López	Citroën Total WTCC
Second		(Italy) Gabriele Tarquini	Castrol Honda Team
Third		(Portugal) Tiago Monteiro	Castrol Honda Team
Fastest Lap
Driver		(Argentina) José María López	Citroën Total WTCC
Time		1:23.864	

The 2014 FIA WTCC Race of Austria was the fifth round of the 2014 World Touring Car Championship season and the third running of the FIA WTCC Race of Austria. It was held on 25 May 2014 at the Salzburgring in Salzburg, Austria.

Both races were won by Citroën Total WTCC, as Yvan Muller won race one and José María López won race two.

== Background ==
López continued to lead the drivers' championship after four rounds, twenty–five points ahead of teammate Sébastien Loeb. Franz Engstler held the lead of the Yokohama Trophy.

No changes were made to the compensation weight system after the previous round; the Citroën C-Elysée WTCC retained the maximum ballast to keep their weight at 1,160 kilograms (2,557 lb) while the rest of the grid remained at the base weight of 1,100 kilograms (2,425 lb).

== Report ==
=== Testing and free practice ===
López was quickest in the shortened test session on Friday with Campos Racing's Hugo Valente second and Mehdi Bennani third in the Proteam Racing Honda. Tom Coronel stopped on the back straight after suffering a puncture at the first chicane while Gabriele Tarquini also stopped on the circuit with technical problems. The two cars stopped on the circuit brought out the red flags three minutes before the end of the session which did not resume.

Free practice one saw López set the pace once again in a session which saw two red flags. The first occurred halfway through when Pasquale Di Sabatino spun at turn ten and collided with the barriers. The session was stopped once again with one minute to go when the Lada of Mikhail Kozlovskiy stopped on the circuit with electrical problems.

Loeb led a Citroën 1–2–3 in practice two which was interrupted by a red flag once again when Valente crashed into the barriers and bounced back across the circuit. The amounting damage to Valente's car was expected to rule him out for the rest of the weekend, but Valente's car was repaired for the races.

=== Qualifying ===
Yvan Muller was quickest in the first part of qualifying, while the three Lukoil Lada Sport TC1 cars of James Thompson, Robert Huff and Mikhail Kozlovskiy were the only three taking part in the session, that failed to progress to Q2.

The second session was stopped midway through due to a crash for Campos Racing's Dušan Borković; he did not set a time and ended the session in 12th place. Muller remained quickest with Coronel second and Gianni Morbidelli third ahead of the other two Citroëns of Loeb and López. Tarquini was tenth and took pole position for race two.

In the Q3 shootout it was Morbidelli who claimed pole position, the first for a non–Citroën driver in 2014. Muller and Loeb were second and third with Coronel fourth ahead of championship leader López.

After qualifying it was found Morbidelli had improved his Q1 time under yellow flags, he was given a five–place grid penalty with Muller inheriting pole position for race one.

=== Race One ===
Muller led away from pole while Coronel passed Loeb to get into second place at the first corner. The move allowed López and Monteiro to get ahead of Loeb; further around the lap Loeb was able to re–pass Monteiro and move into fourth position. On lap five Norbert Michelisz ran wide at turn five which allowed Tarquini to move up to eighth place; Morbidelli had dropped down the order from sixth on the grid and was running tenth. On lap eight López locked up and went straight on at the first chicane, when he returned to the track he had dropped down to third behind Coronel. Coronel kept López at bay for the rest of the race as Muller claimed the win. Franz Engstler was the winner in the TC2 class.

=== Race Two ===
Tarquini started on pole position, while Monteiro – starting from fourth – dived between Mehdi Bennani and Michelisz ahead of him. Behind them the Lada of Thompson was tapped and spun across the circuit, collecting his teammate Huff and colliding with Muller who would need to return to the pits for repairs. Both Ladas were stopped on the pit straight and safety car came out onto the circuit. Under safety car conditions Tom Chilton's right rear wheel came off and went underneath his car, pulling the floor of his Chevrolet Cruze off and leaving him stranded across the circuit. At the same time the Campos Chevrolet of Borković also stopped at the side of the circuit. At this point the red flag came out. The race resumed with Tarquini leading Monteiro, Michelisz and Bennani. López in fifth place was the best placed non–Honda car and on lap five he was able to pass Bennani to take fourth place. On lap six Morbidelli passed Loeb on the back straight while López picked off Michelisz for third. By lap seven Monteiro was under attack from López and lost second place to him. Morbidelli was also moving through the field and passed Bennani for sixth place. On lap 11 Coronel ran wide on the gravel at turn one which had been spread across the track by René Münnich the lap previously. This gave Morbidelli the opportunity to try and pass Coronel before the safety car came out for the circuit to be swept clean. On the restart Tarquini left it late to go as he looked to defend from López, the Citroen passed the Honda on the back straight to take the lead. Coronel and Morbidelli tried to pass Michelisz on the final lap but could not get around the Honda as López claimed the win.

== Results ==
=== Qualifying ===
Pos.	No.	Name	Team	Car	C	Q1	Q2	Q3	Points
1	1	(France) Yvan Muller	Citroën Total WTCC	Citroën C-Elysée WTCC	TC1	1:22.608	1:22.085	1:22.186	**4**
2	9	(France) Sébastien Loeb	Citroën Total WTCC	Citroën C-Elysée WTCC	TC1	1:22.722	1:22.371	1:22.363	**3**
3	4	(Netherlands) Tom Coronel	ROAL Motorsport	Chevrolet RML Cruze TC1	TC1	1:22.960	1:22.168	1:22.432	**2**
4	37	(Argentina) José María López	Citroën Total WTCC	Citroën C-Elysée WTCC	TC1	1:22.619	1:22.471	1:22.507	**1**
5	3	(United Kingdom) Tom Chilton	ROAL Motorsport	Chevrolet RML Cruze TC1	TC1	1:23.354	1:22.565		
6^{1}	10	(Italy) Gianni Morbidelli	ALL-INKL.COM Münnich Motorsport	Chevrolet RML Cruze TC1	TC1	1:22.283	1:22.281	1:22.137	**5**
7	18	(Portugal) Tiago Monteiro	Castrol Honda World Touring Car Team	Honda Civic WTCC	TC1	1:23.097	1:22.790		
8	25	(Morocco) Mehdi Bennani	Proteam Racing	Honda Civic WTCC	TC1	1:23.073	1:22.866		
9	5	(Hungary) Norbert Michelisz	Zengő Motorsport	Honda Civic WTCC	TC1	1:23.207	1:22.871		
10	2	(Italy) **Gabriele Tarquini**	Castrol Honda World Touring Car Team	Honda Civic WTCC	TC1	1:23.527	1:22.929		
11	77	(Germany) René Münnich	ALL-INKL.COM Münnich Motorsport	Chevrolet RML Cruze TC1	TC1	1:23.446	1:23.363		
12	98	(Serbia) Dušan Borković	Campos Racing	Chevrolet RML Cruze TC1	TC1	1:22.948	no time set		
13	11	(United Kingdom) James Thompson	Lukoil Lada Sport	Lada Granta 1.6T	TC1	1:23.705			
14	12	(United Kingdom) Robert Huff	Lukoil Lada Sport	Lada Granta 1.6T	TC1	1:23.722			
15	14	(Russia) Mikhail Kozlovskiy	Lukoil Lada Sport	Lada Granta 1.6T	TC1	1:24.144			
16	6	(Germany) Franz Engstler	Liqui Moly Team Engstler	BMW 320 TC	TC2T	1:27.550			
17	27	(France) John Filippi	Campos Racing	SEAT León WTCC	TC2T	1:28.245			
18	8	(Italy) Pasquale Di Sabatino	Liqui Moly Team Engstler	BMW 320 TC	TC2T	1:28.901			
107% time: 1:28.390
DNQ	7	(France) Hugo Valente	Campos Racing	Chevrolet RML Cruze TC1	TC1	no time set			

- **Bold** denotes Pole position for second race.

^1 — Morbidelli was given a five–place grid penalty after qualifying for ignoring yellow flags, he was allowed to keep the five points for pole position.

=== Race 1 ===
Pos.	No.	Name	Team	Car	C	Laps	Time/Retired	Grid	Points
1	1	(France) Yvan Muller	Citroën Total WTCC	Citroën C-Elysée WTCC	TC1	15	20:56.737	1	25
2	4	(Netherlands) Tom Coronel	ROAL Motorsport	Chevrolet RML Cruze TC1	TC1	15	+3.840	3	18
3	37	(Argentina) **José María López**	Citroën Total WTCC	Citroën C-Elysée WTCC	TC1	15	+4.276	4	15
4	9	(France) Sébastien Loeb	Citroën Total WTCC	Citroën C-Elysée WTCC	TC1	15	+5.427	2	12
5	18	(Portugal) Tiago Monteiro	Castrol Honda World Touring Car Team	Honda Civic WTCC	TC1	15	+12.403	7	10
6	3	(United Kingdom) Tom Chilton	ROAL Motorsport	Chevrolet RML Cruze TC1	TC1	15	+12.945	5	8
7	25	(Morocco) Mehdi Bennani	Proteam Racing	Honda Civic WTCC	TC1	15	+13.566	8	6
8	2	(Italy) Gabriele Tarquini	Castrol Honda World Touring Car Team	Honda Civic WTCC	TC1	15	+14.868	10	4
9	5	(Hungary) Norbert Michelisz	Zengő Motorsport	Honda Civic WTCC	TC1	15	+15.672	9	2
10	10	(Italy) Gianni Morbidelli	ALL-INKL.COM Münnich Motorsport	Chevrolet RML Cruze TC1	TC1	15	+16.184	6	1
11	77	(Germany) René Münnich	ALL-INKL.COM Münnich Motorsport	Chevrolet RML Cruze TC1	TC1	15	+25.974	11	
12	12	(United Kingdom) Robert Huff	Lukoil Lada Sport	Lada Granta 1.6T	TC1	15	+27.778	13	
13	11	(United Kingdom) James Thompson	Lukoil Lada Sport	Lada Granta 1.6T	TC1	15	+31.278	16	
14	14	(Russia) Mikhail Kozlovskiy	Lukoil Lada Sport	Lada Granta 1.6T	TC1	15	+41.924	17	
15	6	(Germany) Franz Engstler	Liqui Moly Team Engstler	BMW 320 TC	TC2T	15	+1:20.251	14	
16	27	(France) John Filippi	Campos Racing	SEAT León WTCC	TC2T	14	+1 Lap	18	
17	8	(Italy) Pasquale Di Sabatino	Liqui Moly Team Engstler	BMW 320 TC	TC2T	14	+1 Lap	15	
Ret	98	(Serbia) Dušan Borković	Campos Racing	Chevrolet RML Cruze TC1	TC1	5	Retired	12	
NC	7	(France) Hugo Valente	Campos Racing	Chevrolet RML Cruze TC1	TC1	4	+11 Laps	19	

Bold denotes Fastest lap.

=== Race 2 ===
Pos.	No.	Name	Team	Car	C	Laps	Time/Retired	Grid	Points
1	37	(Argentina) **José María López**	Citroën Total WTCC	Citroën C-Elysée WTCC	TC1	17	51:59.898	7	25
2	2	(Italy) Gabriele Tarquini	Castrol Honda World Touring Car Team	Honda Civic WTCC	TC1	17	+1.683	1	18
3	18	(Portugal) Tiago Monteiro	Castrol Honda World Touring Car Team	Honda Civic WTCC	TC1	17	+2.554	4	15
4	5	(Hungary) Norbert Michelisz	Zengő Motorsport	Honda Civic WTCC	TC1	17	+3.651	2	12
5	4	(Netherlands) Tom Coronel	ROAL Motorsport	Chevrolet RML Cruze TC1	TC1	17	+3.908	8	10
6	10	(Italy) Gianni Morbidelli	ALL-INKL.COM Münnich Motorsport	Chevrolet RML Cruze TC1	TC1	17	+4.466	5	8
7	9	(France) Sébastien Loeb	Citroën Total WTCC	Citroën C-Elysée WTCC	TC1	17	+4.758	9	6
8	25	(Morocco) Mehdi Bennani	Proteam Racing	Honda Civic WTCC	TC1	17	+5.418	3	4
9	77	(Germany) René Münnich	ALL-INKL.COM Münnich Motorsport	Chevrolet RML Cruze TC1	TC1	17	+10.074	11	2
10	14	(Russia) Mikhail Kozlovskiy	Lukoil Lada Sport	Lada Granta 1.6T	TC1	17	+15.288	15	1
11	6	(Germany) Franz Engstler	Liqui Moly Team Engstler	BMW 320 TC	TC2T	17	+27.754	16	
12	8	(Italy) Pasquale Di Sabatino	Liqui Moly Team Engstler	BMW 320 TC	TC2T	17	+35.070	18	
13	27	(France) John Filippi	Campos Racing	SEAT León WTCC	TC2T	17	+1:04.568^{1}	17	
Ret	7	(France) Hugo Valente	Campos Racing	Chevrolet RML Cruze TC1	TC1	6	Retired	19	
Ret	1	(France) Yvan Muller	Citroën Total WTCC	Citroën C-Elysée WTCC	TC1	1	Race incident	10	
Ret	3	(United Kingdom) Tom Chilton	ROAL Motorsport	Chevrolet RML Cruze TC1	TC1	0	Race incident	6	
Ret	98	(Serbia) Dušan Borković	Campos Racing	Chevrolet RML Cruze TC1	TC1	0	Race incident	12	
Ret	11	(United Kingdom) James Thompson	Lukoil Lada Sport	Lada Granta 1.6T	TC1	0	Race incident	13	
Ret	12	(United Kingdom) Robert Huff	Lukoil Lada Sport	Lada Granta 1.6T	TC1	0	Race incident	14	

Bold denotes Fastest lap.

^1 — John Filippi received a 30 second penalty.

== Standings after the event ==
Drivers' Championship standings

	Pos	Driver	Points
	1	(Argentina) José María López	179
1	2	(France) Yvan Muller	138
1	3	(France) Sébastien Loeb	134
	4	(Portugal) Tiago Monteiro	96
	5	(Italy) Gabriele Tarquini	74

Yokohama Trophy standings

Pos	Driver	Points
1	(Germany) Franz Engstler	98
2	(Italy) Pasquale Di Sabatino	69
3	(France) John Filippi	52
4	(Czech Republic) Petr Fulín	10
5	(Japan) Yukinori Taniguchi	10

Manufacturers' Championship standings

Pos	Manufacturer	Points
1	(France) Citroën	412
2	(Japan) Honda	269
3	(Russia) Lada	136

- Note: Only the top five positions are included for both sets of drivers' standings.
