= 2013 FIA WTCC Race of Hungary =

Race details
- Round 4 of 12 in the 2013 World Touring Car Championship at Hungaroring in Mogyoród, Hungary.
- Date: 5 May, 2013
- Location: Mogyoród, Hungary
- Course: Hungaroring; 4.381 kilometres (2.722 mi)

Race One
- Laps: 12
Pole position
| Driver | | (France) Yvan Muller | RML |
| Time | | 1:53.426 | |
Podium
| First | | (France) Yvan Muller | RML |
| Second | | (Hungary) Norbert Michelisz | Zengő Motorsport |
| Third | | (Italy) Gabriele Tarquini | Castrol Honda Team |
Fastest Lap
| Driver | | (France) Yvan Muller | RML |
| Time | | 1:55.801 | |

Race Two
- Laps: 14
Podium
| First | | (United Kingdom) Robert Huff | Münnich Motorsport |
| Second | | (Morocco) Mehdi Bennani | Proteam Racing |
| Third | | (United Kingdom) Alex MacDowall | bamboo-engineering |
Fastest Lap
| Driver | | (United Kingdom) Robert Huff | Münnich Motorsport |
| Time | | 1:56.408 | |

The 2013 FIA WTCC Race of Hungary was the fourth round of the 2013 World Touring Car Championship season and the third running of the FIA WTCC Race of Hungary. It was held on 5 May 2013 at the Hungaroring in Mogyoród near Budapest, Hungary.

Race one was won by Yvan Muller of RML from pole position. Race two was won by Robert Huff for ALL-INKL.COM Münnich Motorsport, the first win in the World Touring Car Championship for the team and Huff's first victory as the reigning champion.

== Background ==
After three rounds, Muller was leading the world drivers' championship and James Nash was leading the Yokohama Independents' Trophy.

The compensation weights were revised for the Hungarian rounds with the SEAT León WTCCs gaining 10 kg (22 lb) of ballast and the Honda Civic WTCCs gaining 30 kg (66 lb) of ballast.

Campos Racing expanded to two cars with Hugo Valente returning to the championship to drive alongside Fernando Monje.

== Report ==
=== Free practice ===
Gabriele Tarquini was the quickest driver in the first free practice session on Saturday morning with Tiago Monteiro in second making it a Castrol Honda World Touring Car Team 1–2. Muller was third ahead of the third Honda of Norbert Michelisz. Valente was the quickest SEAT driver in fifth and Slovakia race two winner Tom Coronel was seventh. Charles Ng was black flagged for exceeding the track limits repeatedly.

Chevrolets filled the top three positions at the end of the free practice two with Muller leading teammate Tom Chilton and bamboo-engineering's James Nash. Huff was the top SEAT driver in fourth ahead of Michelisz and Coronel. Tarquini and Monteiro and seventh and eighth both set fastest lap times of 1:55.547. James Thompson was ninth in the best placed Lukoil Lada Sport car. A number of drivers were warned for exceeding the track limits but Stefano D'Aste was black flagged for doing so repeatedly.

=== Qualifying ===
Tarquini was quickest in the first part of qualifying. Fredy Barth set his best lap late in the session which knocked Pepe Oriola out of the top twelve. Nash and Mehdi Bennani were the final two drivers who would go through to Q2 and both were in the pits but Oriola was unable to beat their times for earlier on. Thompson had earlier in the session been running in the top ten but ended the session sixteenth having been called in for weighing near the end of the session.

Michelisz held the fastest time briefly until Muller demoted him moments later, a time the rest of the Q2 participants couldn't beat. The RML driver took pole position ahead of local driver Michelisz and the two works Honda drivers. Tarquini aborted his first lap and at the end of the session and returned to the track near the end of the session to set a time to put him third on the grid ahead of Monteiro. Nash was the quickest independent driver in seventh while his teammate Alex MacDowall in tenth would take the pole position when the grid was reversed for race two.

Tom Boardman had all his times removed when his car failed the ride height check after Q1, he would start at the back of the grid for both races.

=== Warm-Up ===
Michelisz was fastest in warm–up ahead of Huff and Muller. Franz Engstler was black flagged for repeatedly exceeding the track limits.

=== Race One ===
Muller retained his lead at the rolling start with Michelisz and Tarquini remaining second and third respectively. Further down the field at turn two a number of drivers were caught out by a pileup. Darryl O'Young ran into the back of Monje who then collided with Barth while O'Young hit Thompson who retired on the spot with a broken right rear suspension. Oriola also retired at the second corner while Barth returned to the pits for repairs. A number of other drivers were also delayed by the incident including Monteiro who suffered a puncture on the pit straight at the start of lap two and collided with the tyre wall on the outside of the first corner when he was unable to stop. Muller and Michelisz distanced themselves from the rest of the field where Tarquini was running third ahead of Huff. Chilton had been running behind them early on before Bennani ran wide at the penultimate corner allowing Coronel through. Coronel battled with Chilton for a number of laps until the RML driver made a mistake that let both Coronel and Bennani through. Coronel quickly caught up to fourth placed Huff but was unable to take the place, the pair had made light contact on several occasions before Coronel made a mistake and Bennani re–passed the ROAL Motorsport driver. Michelisz had been closing in on Muller in the final laps but couldn't pass and Muller took the win. The battle between Huff and Coronel had allowed Tarquini to break away into a safe third place and Bennani finished fifth to take the independents' victory.

=== Race Two ===
Before the start of the race the Honda Civic of Monteiro was being repaired following the crash in race one but problems with starting the car meant he was not able to get going before the end of the repair time, he therefore started the race from the end of the pit lane. MacDowall was on pole position for the standing start but he was passed straight away by Bennani who took the lead while Huff put himself up into second place. On the exit of the second corner, Tarquini was turned around across the front of Muller's car and was launched into the barriers before coming back across the track in front of Michelisz and then collecting Engstler. The safety car came out while the cars were cleared from the track and Tarquini received medical assistance. The race distance was extended by two laps and Bennani led away at the restart on lap five but Huff took the lead around the outside at the first corner. Having been given a drive–through penalty, Barth then stopped in the pit entry three laps from the end. Huff won the race with Bennani close behind while the Bamboo cars of MacDowall and Nash finished third and fourth ahead of Muller.

Tarquini and Engstler were taken to Budapest's military hospital following their collision, Engstler was discharged later in the day while Tarquini was kept in overnight while still suffering neck pains.

== Results ==
=== Qualifying ===
| Pos. | No. | Name | Team | Car | C | Q1 | Q2 | Points |
|---|---|---|---|---|---|---|---|---|
| 1 | 12 | (France) Yvan Muller | RML | Chevrolet Cruze 1.6T | | 1:54.173 | 1:53.426 | **5** |
| 2 | 5 | (Hungary) Norbert Michelisz | Zengő Motorsport | Honda Civic WTCC | | 1:54.397 | 1:53.806 | **4** |
| 3 | 3 | (Italy) Gabriele Tarquini | Castrol Honda World Touring Car Team | Honda Civic WTCC | | 1:54.076 | 1:53.953 | **3** |
| 4 | 18 | (Portugal) Tiago Monteiro | Castrol Honda World Touring Car Team | Honda Civic WTCC | | 1:54.546 | 1:54.048 | **2** |
| 5 | 15 | (Netherlands) Tom Coronel | ROAL Motorsport | BMW 320 TC | | 1:54.657 | 1:54.077 | **1** |
| 6 | 23 | (United Kingdom) Tom Chilton | RML | Chevrolet Cruze 1.6T | | 1:54.490 | 1:54.181 | |
| 7 | 14 | (United Kingdom) James Nash | bamboo-engineering | Chevrolet Cruze 1.6T | Y | 1:54.767 | 1:54.270 | |
| 8 | 1 | (United Kingdom) Robert Huff | ALL-INKL.COM Münnich Motorsport | SEAT León WTCC | | 1:54.193 | 1:54.380 | |
| 9 | 25 | (Morocco) Mehdi Bennani | Proteam Racing | BMW 320 TC | Y | 1:54.778 | 1:54.455 | |
| 10 | 9 | (United Kingdom) **Alex MacDowall** | bamboo-engineering | Chevrolet Cruze 1.6T | Y | 1:54.498 | 1:54.533 | |
| 11 | 17 | (Denmark) Michel Nykjær | NIKA Racing | Chevrolet Cruze 1.6T | Y | 1:54.652 | 1:54.972 | |
| 12 | 73 | (Switzerland) Fredy Barth | Wiechers-Sport | BMW 320 TC | Y | 1:54.569 | 1:55.054 | |
| 13 | 74 | (Spain) Pepe Oriola | Tuenti Racing Team | SEAT León WTCC | | 1:54.851 | | |
| 14 | 6 | (Germany) Franz Engstler | Liqui Moly Team Engstler | BMW 320 TC | Y | 1:54.958 | | |
| 15 | 26 | (Italy) Stefano D'Aste | PB Racing | BMW 320 TC | Y | 1:55.103 | | |
| 16 | 10 | (United Kingdom) James Thompson | Lukoil Lada Sport | Lada Granta | | 1:55.168 | | |
| 17 | 55 | (Hong Kong) Darryl O'Young | ROAL Motorsport | BMW 320 TC | Y | 1:55.229 | | |
| 18 | 7 | (Hong Kong) Charles Ng | Liqui Moly Team Engstler | BMW 320 TC | Y | 1:55.283 | | |
| 19 | 19 | (Spain) Fernando Monje | Campos Racing | SEAT León WTCC | Y | 1:55.299 | | |
| 20 | 38 | (Germany) Marc Basseng | ALL-INKL.COM Münnich Motorsport | SEAT León WTCC | | 1:55.452 | | |
| 21 | 8 | (Russia) Mikhail Kozlovskiy | Lukoil Lada Sport | Lada Granta | | 1:55.608 | | |
| 22 | 20 | (France) Hugo Valente | Campos Racing | SEAT León WTCC | Y | 1:55.882 | | |
| 23 | 37 | (Germany) René Münnich | ALL-INKL.COM Münnich Motorsport | SEAT León WTCC | Y | 1:56.656 | | |
| EX^{1} | 22 | (United Kingdom) Tom Boardman | Special Tuning Racing | SEAT León WTCC | Y | Excluded | | |

- **Bold** denotes Pole position for second race.

^1 — Boardman had his times deleted when his car failed the ride height test after qualifying.

=== Race 1 ===
| Pos. | No. | Name | Team | Car | C | Laps | Time/Retired | Grid | Points |
|---|---|---|---|---|---|---|---|---|---|
| 1 | 12 | (France) **Yvan Muller** | RML | Chevrolet Cruze 1.6T | | 12 | 23:17.125 | 1 | 25 |
| 2 | 5 | (Hungary) Norbert Michelisz | Zengő Motorsport | Honda Civic WTCC | | 12 | +0.617 | 2 | 18 |
| 3 | 3 | (Italy) Gabriele Tarquini | Castrol Honda World Touring Car Team | Honda Civic WTCC | | 12 | +12.670 | 3 | 15 |
| 4 | 1 | (United Kingdom) Robert Huff | ALL-INKL.COM Münnich Motorsport | SEAT León WTCC | | 12 | +13.573 | 8 | 12 |
| 5 | 25 | (Morocco) Mehdi Bennani | Proteam Racing | BMW 320 TC | Y | 12 | +13.861 | 9 | 10 |
| 6 | 15 | (Netherlands) Tom Coronel | ROAL Motorsport | BMW 320 TC | | 12 | +14.133 | 5 | 8 |
| 7 | 23 | (United Kingdom) Tom Chilton | RML | Chevrolet Cruze 1.6T | | 12 | +15.021 | 6 | 6 |
| 8 | 9 | (United Kingdom) Alex MacDowall | bamboo-engineering | Chevrolet Cruze 1.6T | Y | 12 | +17.343 | 10 | 4 |
| 9 | 14 | (United Kingdom) James Nash | bamboo-engineering | Chevrolet Cruze 1.6T | Y | 12 | +18.073 | 7 | 2 |
| 10 | 17 | (Denmark) Michel Nykjær | NIKA Racing | Chevrolet Cruze 1.6T | Y | 12 | +18.465 | 11 | 1 |
| 11 | 38 | (Germany) Marc Basseng | ALL-INKL.COM Münnich Motorsport | SEAT León WTCC | | 12 | +23.782 | 20 | |
| 12 | 20 | (France) Hugo Valente | Campos Racing | SEAT León WTCC | Y | 12 | +28.395 | 22 | |
| 13 | 6 | (Germany) Franz Engstler | Liqui Moly Team Engstler | BMW 320 TC | Y | 12 | +29.116 | 14 | |
| 14 | 26 | (Italy) Stefano D'Aste | PB Racing | BMW 320 TC | Y | 12 | +30.474 | 15 | |
| 15 | 7 | (Hong Kong) Charles Ng | Liqui Moly Team Engstler | BMW 320 TC | Y | 12 | +34.221 | 18 | |
| 16 | 19 | (Spain) Fernando Monje | Campos Racing | SEAT León WTCC | Y | 12 | +35.498 | 19 | |
| 17 | 8 | (Russia) Mikhail Kozlovskiy | Lukoil Lada Sport | Lada Granta | | 12 | +39.708 | 21 | |
| 18 | 37 | (Germany) René Münnich | ALL-INKL.COM Münnich Motorsport | SEAT León WTCC | Y | 12 | +44.193 | 23 | |
| NC | 55 | (Hong Kong) Darryl O'Young | ROAL Motorsport | BMW 320 TC | Y | 5 | +7 Laps | 17 | |
| Ret | 22 | (United Kingdom) Tom Boardman | Special Tuning Racing | SEAT León WTCC | Y | 3 | Puncture | 24 | |
| Ret | 18 | (Portugal) Tiago Monteiro | Castrol Honda World Touring Car Team | Honda Civic WTCC | | 1 | Puncture | 4 | |
| Ret | 73 | (Switzerland) Fredy Barth | Wiechers-Sport | BMW 320 TC | Y | 1 | Race incident | 12 | |
| Ret | 74 | (Spain) Pepe Oriola | Tuenti Racing Team | SEAT León WTCC | | 0 | Race incident | 13 | |
| Ret | 10 | (United Kingdom) James Thompson | Lukoil Lada Sport | Lada Granta | | 0 | Race incident | 16 | |

- **Bold** denotes Fastest lap.

=== Race 2 ===
| Pos. | No. | Name | Team | Car | C | Laps | Time/Retired | Grid | Points |
|---|---|---|---|---|---|---|---|---|---|
| 1 | 1 | (United Kingdom) **Robert Huff** | ALL-INKL.COM Münnich Motorsport | SEAT León WTCC | | 14 | 29:35.871 | 3 | 25 |
| 2 | 25 | (Morocco) Mehdi Bennani | Proteam Racing | BMW 320 TC | Y | 14 | +0.426 | 2 | 18 |
| 3 | 9 | (United Kingdom) Alex MacDowall | bamboo-engineering | Chevrolet Cruze 1.6T | Y | 14 | +4.043 | 1 | 15 |
| 4 | 14 | (United Kingdom) James Nash | bamboo-engineering | Chevrolet Cruze 1.6T | Y | 14 | +4.465 | 4 | 12 |
| 5 | 12 | (France) Yvan Muller | RML | Chevrolet Cruze 1.6T | | 14 | +4.783 | 9 | 10 |
| 6 | 15 | (Netherlands) Tom Coronel | ROAL Motorsport | BMW 320 TC | | 14 | +5.490 | 6 | 8 |
| 7 | 23 | (United Kingdom) Tom Chilton | RML | Chevrolet Cruze 1.6T | | 14 | +6.835 | 5 | 6 |
| 8 | 5 | (Hungary) Norbert Michelisz | Zengő Motorsport | Honda Civic WTCC | | 14 | +7.232 | 8 | 4 |
| 9 | 17 | (Denmark) Michel Nykjær | NIKA Racing | Chevrolet Cruze 1.6T | Y | 14 | +8.413 | 10 | 2 |
| 10 | 55 | (Hong Kong) Darryl O'Young | ROAL Motorsport | BMW 320 TC | Y | 14 | +8.663 | 14 | 1 |
| 11 | 26 | (Italy) Stefano D'Aste | PB Racing | BMW 320 TC | Y | 14 | +10.180 | 13 | |
| 12 | 10 | (United Kingdom) James Thompson | Lukoil Lada Sport | Lada Granta | | 14 | +14.305 | 22 | |
| 13 | 18 | (Portugal) Tiago Monteiro | Castrol Honda World Touring Car Team | Honda Civic WTCC | | 14 | +14.886 | 20^{1} | |
| 14 | 7 | (Hong Kong) Charles Ng | Liqui Moly Team Engstler | BMW 320 TC | Y | 14 | +20.289 | 15 | |
| 15 | 22 | (United Kingdom) Tom Boardman | Special Tuning Racing | SEAT León WTCC | Y | 14 | +23.547 | 24 | |
| 16 | 74 | (Spain) Pepe Oriola | Tuenti Racing Team | SEAT León WTCC | | 14 | +24.227 | 11 | |
| 17 | 38 | (Germany) Marc Basseng | ALL-INKL.COM Münnich Motorsport | SEAT León WTCC | | 14 | +25.395 | 17 | |
| 18 | 19 | (Spain) Fernando Monje | Campos Racing | SEAT León WTCC | Y | 14 | +26.536 | 16 | |
| 19 | 20 | (France) Hugo Valente | Campos Racing | SEAT León WTCC | Y | 14 | +31.352 | 23 | |
| 20 | 8 | (Russia) Mikhail Kozlovskiy | Lukoil Lada Sport | Lada Granta | | 14 | +32.330 | 18 | |
| 21 | 37 | (Germany) René Münnich | ALL-INKL.COM Münnich Motorsport | SEAT León WTCC | Y | 14 | +32.710 | 19 | |
| 22 | 73 | (Switzerland) Fredy Barth | Wiechers-Sport | BMW 320 TC | Y | 11 | +3 Laps | 21 | |
| Ret | 6 | (Germany) Franz Engstler | Liqui Moly Team Engstler | BMW 320 TC | Y | 0 | Race incident | 12 | |
| Ret | 3 | (Italy) Gabriele Tarquini | Castrol Honda World Touring Car Team | Honda Civic WTCC | | 0 | Race incident | 7 | |

- **Bold** denotes Fastest lap.

^1 — Monteiro started from the pit lane.

== Standings after the event ==
Drivers' Championship standings

| | Pos | Driver | Points |
|---|---|---|---|
| | 1 | (France) Yvan Muller | 160 |
| | 2 | (Italy) Gabriele Tarquini | 114 |
| 7 | 3 | (United Kingdom) Robert Huff | 68 |
| | 4 | (United Kingdom) Tom Chilton | 67 |
| | 5 | (United Kingdom) James Nash | 65 |

Yokohama Independents' Trophy standings

| | Pos | Driver | Points |
|---|---|---|---|
| | 1 | (United Kingdom) James Nash | 59 |
| 1 | 2 | (United Kingdom) Alex MacDowall | 53 |
| 1 | 3 | (Denmark) Michel Nykjær | 52 |
| 2 | 4 | (Morocco) Mehdi Bennani | 38 |
| 1 | 5 | (Hong Kong) Darryl O'Young | 29 |

Manufacturers' Championship standings

| Pos | Manufacturer | Points |
|---|---|---|
| 1 | (Japan) Honda | 332 |
| 2 | (Russia) Lada | 179 |

- Note: Only the top five positions are included for both sets of drivers' standings.
