= 2013 FIA WTCC Race of the United States =

Race details
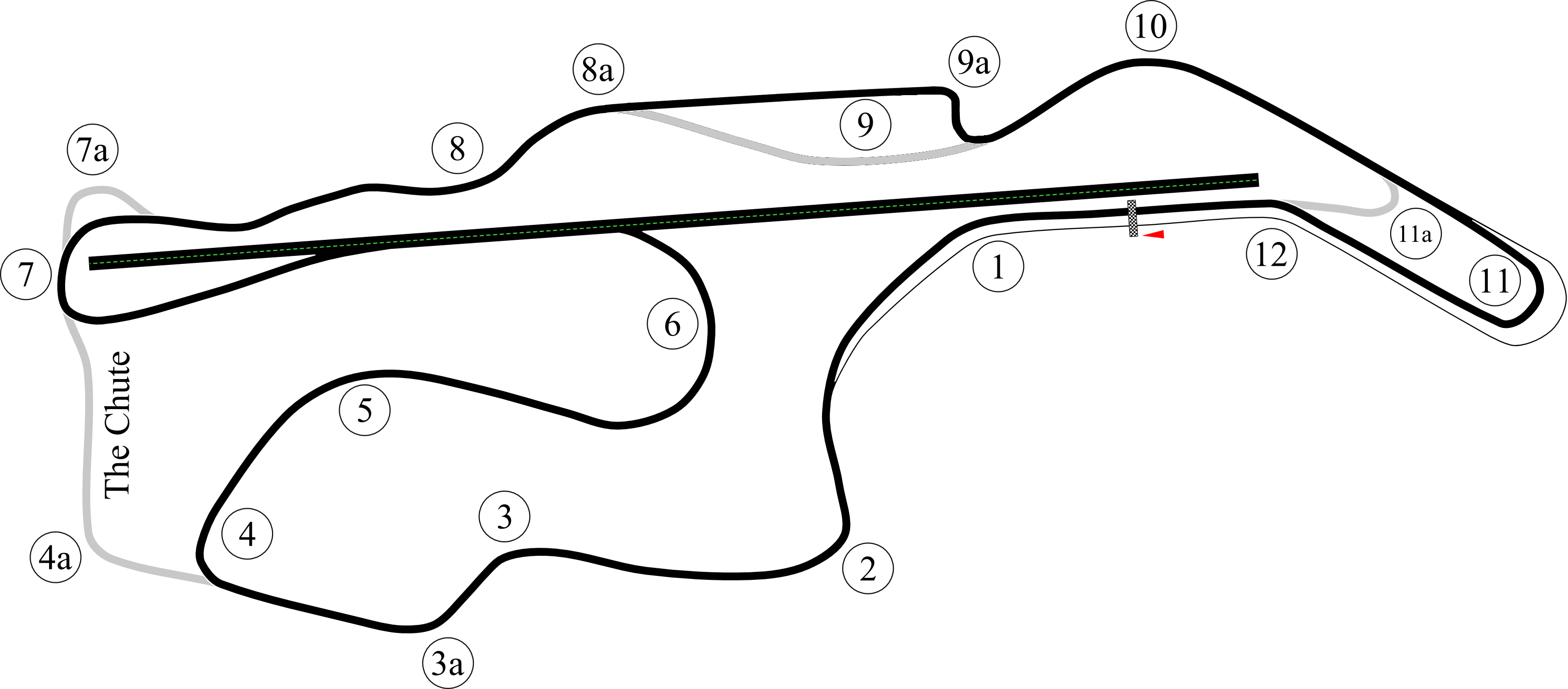
- Round 9 of 12 in the 2013 World Touring Car Championship at Sonoma Raceway in Sonoma, United States.
- Date: 8 September, 2013
- Location: Sonoma, United States
- Course: Sonoma Raceway; 4.032 kilometres (2.505 mi)

Race One
- Laps: 13
Pole position
Driver		(United Kingdom) Tom Chilton	RML
Time		1:45.583	
Podium
First		(United Kingdom) Tom Chilton	RML
Second		(Portugal) Tiago Monteiro	Castrol Honda Team
Third		(France) Yvan Muller	RML
Fastest Lap
Driver		(Portugal) Tiago Monteiro	Castrol Honda Team
Time		1:46.905	

Race Two
- Laps: 13
Podium
First		(Italy) Gabriele Tarquini	Castrol Honda Team
Second		(Morocco) Mehdi Bennani	Proteam Racing
Third		(Hungary) Norbert Michelisz	Zengő Motorsport
Fastest Lap
Driver		(Hungary) Norbert Michelisz	Zengő Motorsport
Time		1:47.869	

The 2013 FIA WTCC Race of the United States was the ninth round of the 2013 World Touring Car Championship season and the second running of the FIA WTCC Race of the United States. It was held on 8 September 2013 at the Sonoma Raceway in Sonoma, California, United States.

Race one was won by Tom Chilton of RML, his first victory in the World Touring Car Championship. Race two was won by Gabriele Tarquini of the Castrol Honda World Touring Car Team. Honda secured the 2013 Manufacturers' Championship in race two.

== Background ==
Muller was leading the drivers' championship by 132 points over Michel Nykjær. Muller had his first mathematical opportunity to secure a fourth world title in race two. Nykjær was leading the Yokohama Independents' Trophy.

The Honda Civic WTCCs gained 10 kg under the compensation weight re-calculation to take them up to 1,160 kg. The SEAT León WTCCs lost 10 kg of weight to take them to 1,140 kg, below the base weight of 1,150 kg. The Chevrolets, BMWs and Ladas were not changed.

Fredy Barth returned to Wiechers-Sport, replacing José María López while Tom Boardman returned with Special Tuning Racing.

== Report ==
=== Testing and free practice ===
Tiago Monteiro was quickest in Friday's warm–up session, Robert Huff was second. James Thompson damaged his suspension early on and went on to finish 17th.

Pepe Oriola led a Chevrolet 1–2–3 in free practice one ahead of Chilton and Yvan Muller. The session was stopped early on when the ROAL Motorsport car of Tom Coronel crashed into the barriers at turn 11.

Muller was on top in practice two ahead of Norbert Michelisz and Hugo Valente. The session was briefly stopped with Valente's Campos Racing teammate Fernando Monje crashed into the barriers at turn 9.

=== Qualifying ===
Monteiro was the first driver out of the pits at the start of qualifying. Alex MacDowall lost the rear of his Chevrolet Cruze on the exit of turn one and went off the track but he quickly recovered to the circuit, Fernando Monje and Chilton also had similar excursions off the track at the first corner during Q1. Muller was now quickest with the three Honda drivers his nearest challengers until Oriola moved up to third. Marc Basseng put in a quick lap at the end of the session to move into the top twelve and Mehdi Bennani was another late improver at the expense of Coronel. Muller was still quickest at the end of the session with the Hondas of Monteiro and Michelisz second and third.

Monteiro was the first to post a lap time in Q2 which was quickly beaten by Muller, Chilton then slotted into second. After their first runs most of the cars headed back to the pits while Nykjær headed out onto the track to set his time. Tarquini set only one quick lap and went tenth to secure pole position for race two, Chilton then went quickest ahead of Muller to take his first pole position in the WTCC.

After qualifying, the seat positions of NIKA Racing's Nykjær and the Campos Racing pair of Monje and Valente were found not to comply with the regulations. All three drivers lost their qualifying times and were sent to the back of the grid for both races. Michelisz would start race one from the back of the grid following an engine change before qualifying.

=== Warm-Up ===
Michelisz was fastest in the morning warm–up session ahead of Thompson, Chilton was sixth.

=== Race One ===
Chilton led away from the rolling start while Monteiro passed Muller to move into second place. By the end of the lap Muller was under pressure from the MacDowall. Bennani spun on lap two with Barth having to avoid the spinning BMW, both dropped to near the back of the field as a result. Darryl O'Young came in to the pits after two laps for repairs. On lap three Monteiro began to challenge Chilton for the lead while further back Coronel was challenging Huff for seventh. By lap eight there was a train of cars building up behind Huff with his team-mate Basseng attacking Coronel. On lap ten Coronel was able to pass Huff with a small tap on the back bumper of the SEAT. Chilton successfully converted his first WTCC pole position into his first WTCC victory, leading home Monteiro and Muller complete the podium. Monje and Barth were side–by–side at the finish line with Monje narrowly ahead, ahead of them Nykjær finished 13th having started at the back of the grid.

After the race, Boardman and Monje were given 30–second penalties for speeding during the rolling start, dropping them from 12th and 16th to 21st and 23rd respectively.

=== Race Two ===
Tarquini took the lead from Bennani at the second corner while Rene Munnich went off the track. Further behind Muller was beginning his move up the field and took sixth off Monteiro. On lap two Huff slowed down with a right front puncture and returned to the pits. Muller had now caught up with Nash who was keeping the Frenchman at bay and allowing Monteiro to keep up with the Chevrolets. Muller made a pass on lap four at the first hairpin, Monteiro then pulled off a similar move on Nash at the final corner. On lap five Coronel also passed Nash who was now in seventh place having run fourth the previous lap. Charles Ng had a spin at turn 6 and after kicking up plenty of dust he was able to continue. Bennani in second was being challenged by Michelisz while Barth passed Nash on lap nine after two laps of trying to overtake. Basseng was tenth with race one retiree O'Young was trying to make a move on the SEAT with race one winner Chilton behind O'Young. On lap 11 Michelisz was beginning to struggle with the pressure of having Muller behind him, the loose rear end of his car producing puffs of smoke from his tyres at several corners around the lap. Chilton had a slide at turn two at the start of lap 12, narrowly avoiding O'Young as he came across the track. Tarquini claimed the victory with Bennani taking second and the independents' victory having suffered from steering problems throughout the race, Michelisz held onto third place ahead of Muller. Honda secured the world manufacturers championship.

== Results ==
=== Qualifying ===
Pos.	No.	Name	Team	Car	C	Q1	Q2	Points
1	23	(United Kingdom) Tom Chilton	RML	Chevrolet Cruze 1.6T		1:46.366	1:45.583	**5**
2	12	(France) Yvan Muller	RML	Chevrolet Cruze 1.6T		1:45.941	1:45.708	**4**
3	18	(Portugal) Tiago Monteiro	Castrol Honda World Touring Car Team	Honda Civic WTCC		1:46.340	1:46.240	**3**
4	74	(Spain) Pepe Oriola	Tuenti Racing Team	Chevrolet Cruze 1.6T		1:46.510	1:46.266	**2**
5	9	(United Kingdom) Alex MacDowall	bamboo-engineering	Chevrolet Cruze 1.6T	Y	1:46.877	1:46.411	**1**
6	14	(United Kingdom) James Nash	bamboo-engineering	Chevrolet Cruze 1.6T	Y	1:46.957	1:46.565	
7	5	(Hungary) Norbert Michelisz	Zengő Motorsport	Honda Civic WTCC		1:46.346	1:46.648	
8	1	(United Kingdom) Robert Huff	ALL-INKL.COM Münnich Motorsport	SEAT León WTCC		1:46.736	1:46.659	
9	3	(Italy) Gabriele Tarquini	Castrol Honda World Touring Car Team	Honda Civic WTCC		1:46.716	1:46.865	
10	25	(Morocco) **Mehdi Bennani**	Proteam Racing	BMW 320 TC	Y	1:46.788	1:46.919	
11	38	(Germany) Marc Basseng	ALL-INKL.COM Münnich Motorsport	SEAT León WTCC		1:46.600	1:47.711	
12	15	(Netherlands) Tom Coronel	ROAL Motorsport	BMW 320 TC		1:47.038		
13	73	(Switzerland) Fredy Barth	Wiechers-Sport	BMW 320 TC	Y	1:47.078		
14	55	(Hong Kong) Darryl O'Young	ROAL Motorsport	BMW 320 TC	Y	1:47.126		
15	6	(Germany) Franz Engstler	Liqui Moly Team Engstler	BMW 320 TC	Y	1:47.277		
16	10	(United Kingdom) James Thompson	Lukoil Lada Sport	Lada Granta		1:47.583		
17	26	(Italy) Stefano D'Aste	PB Racing	BMW 320 TC	Y	1:47.637		
18	7	(Hong Kong) Charles Ng	Liqui Moly Team Engstler	BMW 320 TC	Y	1:47.892		
19	8	(Russia) Mikhail Kozlovskiy	Lukoil Lada Sport	Lada Granta		1:48.070		
20	37	(Germany) René Münnich	ALL-INKL.COM Münnich Motorsport	SEAT León WTCC	Y	1:48.279		
21	22	(United Kingdom) Tom Boardman	Special Tuning Racing	SEAT León WTCC	Y	1:48.530		
107% time: 1:56.799
EX^{1}	17	(Denmark) Michel Nykjær	NIKA Racing	Chevrolet Cruze 1.6T	Y	Excluded		
EX^{1}	19	(Spain) Fernando Monje	Campos Racing	SEAT León WTCC	Y	Excluded		
EX^{1}	20	(France) Hugo Valente	Campos Racing	SEAT León WTCC	Y	Excluded		

- **Bold** denotes Pole position for second race.

^1 Nykjær, Monje and Valente were excluded from qualifying when it was found their seat positions breached the regulations.

=== Race 1 ===
Pos.	No.	Name	Team	Car	C	Laps	Time/Retired	Grid	Points
1	23	(United Kingdom) Tom Chilton	RML	Chevrolet Cruze 1.6T		13	23:24.716	1	25
2	18	(Portugal) **Tiago Monteiro**	Castrol Honda World Touring Car Team	Honda Civic WTCC		13	+2.161	3	18
3	12	(France) Yvan Muller	RML	Chevrolet Cruze 1.6T		13	+6.534	2	15
4	9	(United Kingdom) Alex MacDowall	bamboo-engineering	Chevrolet Cruze 1.6T	Y	13	+10.659	5	12
5	14	(United Kingdom) James Nash	bamboo-engineering	Chevrolet Cruze 1.6T	Y	13	+12.676	6	10
6	3	(Italy) Gabriele Tarquini	Castrol Honda World Touring Car Team	Honda Civic WTCC		13	+14.897	8	8
7	15	(Netherlands) Tom Coronel	ROAL Motorsport	BMW 320 TC		13	+18.530	11	6
8	1	(United Kingdom) Robert Huff	ALL-INKL.COM Münnich Motorsport	SEAT León WTCC		13	+21.561	7	4
9	38	(Germany) Marc Basseng	ALL-INKL.COM Münnich Motorsport	SEAT León WTCC		13	+22.558	10	2
10	26	(Italy) Stefano D'Aste	PB Racing	BMW 320 TC	Y	13	+23.266	16	1
11	74	(Spain) Pepe Oriola	Tuenti Racing Team	Chevrolet Cruze 1.6T		13	+26.219	4	
12	17	(Denmark) Michel Nykjær	NIKA Racing	Chevrolet Cruze 1.6T	Y	13	+35.488	22	
13	20	(France) Hugo Valente	Campos Racing	SEAT León WTCC	Y	13	+37.826	23	
14	10	(United Kingdom) James Thompson	Lukoil Lada Sport	Lada Granta		13	+40.811	15	
15	73	(Switzerland) Fredy Barth	Wiechers-Sport	BMW 320 TC	Y	13	+41.469	12	
16	7	(Hong Kong) Charles Ng	Liqui Moly Team Engstler	BMW 320 TC	Y	13	+41.971	17	
17	6	(Germany) Franz Engstler	Liqui Moly Team Engstler	BMW 320 TC	Y	13	+42.242	14	
18	25	(Morocco) Mehdi Bennani	Proteam Racing	BMW 320 TC	Y	13	+42.805	9	
19	8	(Russia) Mikhail Kozlovskiy	Lukoil Lada Sport	Lada Granta		13	+43.997	18	
20	5	(Hungary) Norbert Michelisz	Zengő Motorsport	Honda Civic WTCC		13	+48.934	21	
21	22	(United Kingdom) Tom Boardman	Special Tuning Racing	SEAT León WTCC	Y	13	+56.653	20	
22	37	(Germany) René Münnich	ALL-INKL.COM Münnich Motorsport	SEAT León WTCC	Y	13	+1:08.203	19	
23	19	(Spain) Fernando Monje	Campos Racing	SEAT León WTCC	Y	13	+1:11.457	24	
Ret	55	(Hong Kong) Darryl O'Young	ROAL Motorsport	BMW 320 TC	Y	5	Race incident	13	

- **Bold** denotes Fastest lap.

=== Race 2 ===
Pos.	No.	Name	Team	Car	C	Laps	Time/Retired	Grid	Points
1	3	(Italy) Gabriele Tarquini	Castrol Honda World Touring Car Team	Honda Civic WTCC		13	23:40.401	2	25
2	25	(Morocco) Mehdi Bennani	Proteam Racing	BMW 320 TC	Y	13	+2.434	1	18
3	5	(Hungary) **Norbert Michelisz**	Zengő Motorsport	Honda Civic WTCC		13	+4.099	4	15
4	12	(France) Yvan Muller	RML	Chevrolet Cruze 1.6T		13	+4.606	9	12
5	18	(Portugal) Tiago Monteiro	Castrol Honda World Touring Car Team	Honda Civic WTCC		13	+4.941	8	10
6	15	(Netherlands) Tom Coronel	ROAL Motorsport	BMW 320 TC		13	+7.735	12	8
7	73	(Switzerland) Fredy Barth	Wiechers-Sport	BMW 320 TC	Y	13	+14.165	13	6
8	14	(United Kingdom) James Nash	bamboo-engineering	Chevrolet Cruze 1.6T	Y	13	+17.865	5	4
9	38	(Germany) Marc Basseng	ALL-INKL.COM Münnich Motorsport	SEAT León WTCC		13	+18.746	11	2
10	26	(Italy) Stefano D'Aste	PB Racing	BMW 320 TC	Y	13	+19.234	17	1
11	23	(United Kingdom) Tom Chilton	RML	Chevrolet Cruze 1.6T		13	+20.858	10	
12	55	(Hong Kong) Darryl O'Young	ROAL Motorsport	BMW 320 TC	Y	13	+22.239	14	
13	9	(United Kingdom) Alex MacDowall	bamboo-engineering	Chevrolet Cruze 1.6T	Y	13	+24.265	6	
14	20	(France) Hugo Valente	Campos Racing	SEAT León WTCC	Y	13	+24.436	23	
15	19	(Spain) Fernando Monje	Campos Racing	SEAT León WTCC	Y	13	+31.098	24	
16	10	(United Kingdom) James Thompson	Lukoil Lada Sport	Lada Granta		13	+32.650	16	
17	17	(Denmark) Michel Nykjær	NIKA Racing	Chevrolet Cruze 1.6T	Y	13	+32.794	22	
18	8	(Russia) Mikhail Kozlovskiy	Lukoil Lada Sport	Lada Granta		13	+47.352	19	
19	37	(Germany) René Münnich	ALL-INKL.COM Münnich Motorsport	SEAT León WTCC	Y	13	+47.553	20	
20	1	(United Kingdom) Robert Huff	ALL-INKL.COM Münnich Motorsport	SEAT León WTCC		12	+1 Lap	3	
21	74	(Spain) Pepe Oriola	Tuenti Racing Team	Chevrolet Cruze 1.6T		10	+3 Laps	7	
22	22	(United Kingdom) Tom Boardman	Special Tuning Racing	SEAT León WTCC	Y	9	+4 Laps	21	
Ret	7	(Hong Kong) Charles Ng	Liqui Moly Team Engstler	BMW 320 TC	Y	6	Race incident	18	
Ret	6	(Germany) Franz Engstler	Liqui Moly Team Engstler	BMW 320 TC	Y	2	Race incident	15	

- **Bold** denotes Fastest lap.

== Standings after the event ==
Drivers' Championship standings

	Pos	Driver	Points
	1	(France) Yvan Muller	343
1	2	(Italy) Gabriele Tarquini	199
1	3	(Denmark) Michel Nykjær	180
	4	(United Kingdom) James Nash	160
1	5	(United Kingdom) Tom Chilton	160

Yokohama Independents' Trophy standings

Pos	Driver	Points
1	(Denmark) Michel Nykjær	134
2	(United Kingdom) James Nash	134
3	(United Kingdom) Alex MacDowall	103
4	(Morocco) Mehdi Bennani	71
5	(Italy) Stefano D'Aste	69

Manufacturers' Championship standings

Pos	Manufacturer	Points
1	(Japan) Honda	756
2	(Russia) Lada	456

- Note: Only the top five positions are included for both sets of drivers' standings.
