= JAS Motorsport =

Italian motor racing team

- Founded: 1995
- Base: Milan, Lombardy, Italy
- Team principal(s): Maurizio Ambrogetti; Alessandro Mariani
- Current series: TCR; GT3
- Former series: DTM; STW; Euro STC; BTCC; IRC; WRC; ERC; ETCC; WTCC; IGTC
- Website: jasmotorsport.com

JAS Motorsport is an Italian motor racing team and an engineering and manufacturing company. It was founded in 1995 by Paolo Jasson, Maurizio Ambrogetti and Giorgio Schön. The company initially competed with Alfa Romeo in 1996 and 1997. Since 1998, they have been an official partner of Honda, and have developed, built and raced cars in various different disciplines for the Japanese manufacturer, as well as provided customer racing services.

== History ==
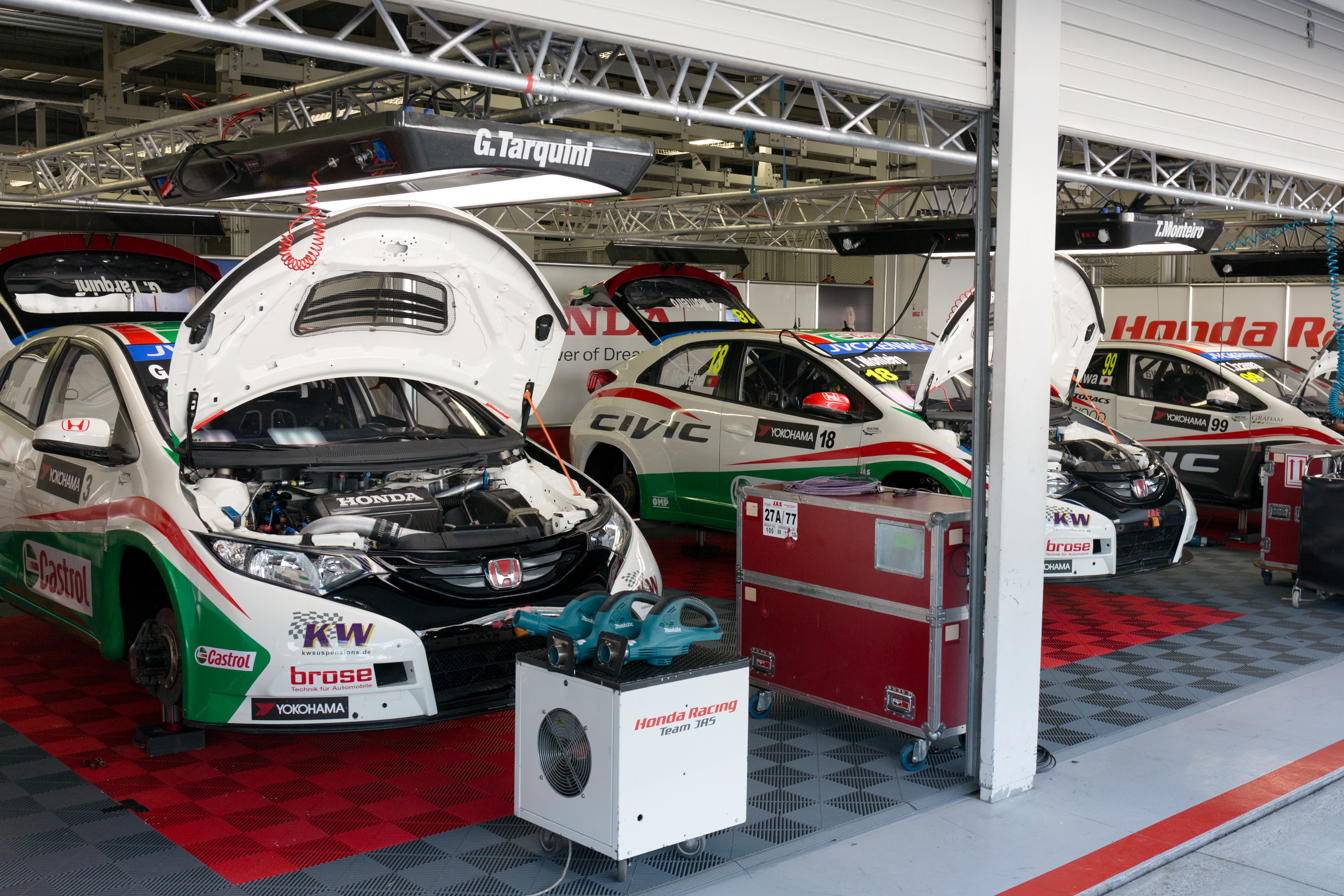
JAS operated the Honda WTCC team in the mid-2010s, winning the Manufacturers' World Championship in 2013.

JAS Motorsport was founded on 1 September 1995. The team raced four Alfa Romeo 155 V6 TIs in the 1996 International Touring Car Championship, scoring seven podiums and a victory at Silverstone with Gabriele Tarquini. In 1997 they raced two Alfa Romeos in the Super Tourenwagen Cup, with two seventh places being their best results that season.

In 1998, JAS became a partner of Honda. It began competing with Honda Accords in the Super Tourenwagen Cup, and would claim a victory in the 1998 season, before scoring four wins, 17 podiums and third place in the drivers' championship for Tom Kristensen in 1999. The team then competed with Accords in the European Super Touring Cup/Championship in 2000 and 2001, where it scored 15 wins – more than any other team – and finished runner-up in the teams' championship in 2001. JAS also helped running the BTCC Honda team in 2000, which claimed seven victories that year, including the last three wins of the championship's Super Touring era.

In 2004, JAS launched the Honda Accord Euro-R for the Super 2000 regulations. Ryan Sharp scored Honda's first World Touring Car Championship podium with the car in 2006, before James Thompson drove it to take the Japanese manufacturer's first overall WTCC win at the Race of Europe in 2008. The car later won three consecutive European Touring Car Cup titles between 2009 and 2011 with Thompson and Fabrizio Giovanardi.

For R3 rallying regulations, JAS made the Civic Type-R R3, which began competing in 2007. The car won the 2WD manufacturers' title for Honda in the Intercontinental Rally Challenge in 2011, before winning the 2WD title in the European Rally Championship in 2013 and 2014.

In 2012, Honda announced that it would join the World Touring Car Championship, with JAS running the team and developing the chassis. The team raced in the final three rounds of the 2012 season, with Tiago Monteiro scoring a podium in Macau. In their first full season in 2013, the team were crowned Manufacturers' World Champions, with the Civics scoring four victories and 20 podiums, including podium lockouts in Slovakia and China. After the introduction of the new TC1 regulations a year earlier than planned in 2014 gave a significant development advantage to rival manufacturer Citroën, the team won multiple races over the following seasons, but did not contend for the title again until 2017. The team scored the most pole positions and main race victories in 2017, but missed out on another title due to numerous incidents, including Monteiro's testing accident. Following increasing interest in the customer-focused TCR regulations, the WTCC was discontinued after the season, with Honda winning its final race.

JAS has built three variants of the Honda Civic for the customer-based TCR category: the FK2, FK7 and FL5, which were introduced in 2015, 2018 and 2023, respectively. These models have been used by customers to win over 600 races and 125 championships, helping the car to clinch the global TCR Model of the Year title in 2019, 2020 and 2024. This tally includes championship wins in the Asian, Australian, Benelux, Brazilian, British, Danish, European, German, International, Italian, Japanese, Middle Eastern, South American and Spanish TCR series, as well as in North America's SCCA World Challenge, Japan's Super Taikyu and the European Touring Car Cup. Other notable results include wins in the Nürburgring 24 Hours, the Fuji 24 Hours, the Macau Guia Race and the touring car gold medal at the FIA Motorsport Games.

JAS Motorsport developed the GT3 racing version of the second-generation NSX sports car in collaboration with Honda, and is also responsible for assembling the cars and providing customer support in Europe, Asia and South America. The NSX GT3 made its racing debut in 2017 and received an Evo upgrade in 2019, followed by an Evo22 update in 2022. The car notably won the 2019 and 2020 championships in the GTD class of the IMSA SportsCar Championship, as well as the 2019 titles in the GT300 class of the Super GT Series, among others. JAS ran the car in the Intercontinental GT Challenge in 2019 and 2020, where they achieved pole position and podium results, finished sixth overall at the 2019 Spa 24 Hours, and nearly won the 2020 drivers' title.

== Car constructor ==
Year	Model	Picture	Engine	Class
2002	Honda Civic Type-R			Super 2000
2003	Honda Accord Euro-R		Honda K20A4 2.0L I4	Super 2000
2007	Honda Civic Type-R FN2 R3			FIA Group R
2012	Honda Civic WTCC (S2000)			Super 2000
2013	Honda Civic CTCC FC1			CTCC
2014	Honda Civic WTCC (TC1)		Honda HR412E 1.6L I4	TC1
2015	Honda Civic TCR (FK2)		Honda K20C1 i-VTEC DOHC Turbo I4	TCR
2016	Honda Civic TCR (FK2)		Honda K20C1 i-VTEC DOHC Turbo I4	TCR
2016	Honda Civic TCS			TCS
2017	Acura NSX GT3		Honda JNC1 twin-turbocharged 3.5L V6	Group GT3
2018	Honda Civic Type R TCR (FK7)		Honda K20C1 i-VTEC DOHC Turbo I4	TCR
2023	Honda Civic Type R TCR (FL5)		Honda K20C1 i-VTEC DOHC Turbo I4	TCR

== Complete World Touring Car Championship results ==
(key) (Races in bold indicate pole position) (Races in italics indicate fastest lap)

Year	Entrant	No.	Driver	Car	1	2	3	4	5	6	7	8	9	10	11	12	13	14	15	16	17	18	19	20	21	22	23	24	Pos	Points
2012	Honda Racing Team JAS	18	(Portugal) **Tiago Monteiro**	Honda Civic S2000 TC	ITA; 1	ITA; 2	ESP; 1	ESP; 2	MAR; 1	MAR; 2	SVK; 1	SVK; 2	HUN; 1	HUN; 2	AUT; 1	AUT; 2	POR; 1	POR; 2	BRA; 1	BRA; 2	USA; 1	USA; 2	JPN; 1; 9	JPN; 2; 10	CHN; 1; 13	CHN; 2; 10	MAC; 1; 3	MAC; 2; 4	—N/a	
2013	Castrol Honda World Touring Car Team	3	(Italy) **Gabriele Tarquini**	Honda Civic WTCC	ITA; 1; 4	ITA; 2; 3	**MAR**; **1**; 2	MAR; 2 Ret	**SVK**; **1**; 1	SVK; 2; 3	HUN; 1; 3	HUN; 2 Ret	AUT; 1; 12	AUT; 2; 8	RUS; 1; 6	RUS; 2; 7	POR; 1 Ret	POR; 2; 20	ARG; 1; 4	ARG; 2; 2	USA; 1; 6	USA; 2; 1	JPN; 1; 27†	JPN; 2; 4	CHN; 1; 7	CHN; 2; 2	MAC; 1 DNS	MAC; 2; 8	**1st**	**1017**
2013	Castrol Honda World Touring Car Team	18	(Portugal) **Tiago Monteiro**	Honda Civic WTCC	ITA; 1; 5	ITA; 2; 8	MAR; 1 Ret	MAR; 2 DNS	SVK; 1; 2	SVK; 2; 5	HUN; 1 Ret	HUN; 2; 13	AUT; 1; 13	AUT; 2; 4	RUS; 1; 12	RUS; 2; 12	POR; 1; 9	POR; 2; 11	ARG; 1; 10	ARG; 2; 6	USA; 1; 2	USA; 2; 5	JPN; 1; 28†	JPN; 2; 3	CHN; 1; 11	**CHN**; **2**; 1	MAC; 1; 2	MAC; 2 Ret	**1st**	**1017**
2013	Zengő Motorsport	5	(Hungary) **Norbert Michelisz**	Honda Civic WTCC	ITA; 1; 8	ITA; 2; 22	MAR; 1 Ret	MAR; 2; 15†	SVK; 1; 3	SVK; 2; 21	HUN; 1; 2	HUN; 2; 8	AUT; 1; 14	AUT; 2; 3	RUS; 1; 3	RUS; 2; 5	POR; 1 Ret	POR; 2 DNS	ARG; 1; 7	ARG; 2; 5	USA; 1; 20	USA; 2; 3	**JPN**; **1**; 1	JPN; 2 Ret	CHN; 1; 10	CHN; 2; 3	MAC; 1; 4	MAC; 2 Ret	**1st**	**1017**
2014	Castrol Honda World Touring Car Team	2	(Italy) **Gabriele Tarquini**	Honda Civic WTCC	MAR; 1 DNS	MAR; 2 DNS	FRA; 1; 3	FRA; 2; 4	HUN; 1; 4	HUN; 2; 8	SVK; 1; 8	SVK; 2 C	AUT; 1; 8	**AUT**; **2**; 2	RUS; 1; 2	RUS; 2 Ret	BEL; 1; 8	BEL; 2; 8	ARG; 1; 8	ARG; 2; 4	BEI; 1; 16†	BEI; 2; 10	CHN; 1; 6	CHN; 2 Ret	JPN; 1; 6	**JPN**; **2**; 1	MAC; 1; 3	MAC; 2 DNS	**2nd**	**710**
2014	Castrol Honda World Touring Car Team	18	(Portugal) **Tiago Monteiro**	Honda Civic WTCC	MAR; 1; 5	MAR; 2; 10†	FRA; 1; 8	FRA; 2; 3	HUN; 1; 3	HUN; 2; 2	SVK; 1; 7	**SVK**; **2** C	AUT; 1; 5	AUT; 2; 3	RUS; 1; 7	RUS; 2 Ret	BEL; 1; 6	BEL; 2; 4	ARG; 1; 5	ARG; 2; 5	BEI; 1 Ret	BEI; 2; 13	CHN; 1; 7	CHN; 2; 2	JPN; 1; 9	JPN; 2; 9	MAC; 1; 4	MAC; 2; 16†	**2nd**	**710**
2014	Zengő Motorsport	5	(Hungary) **Norbert Michelisz**	Honda Civic WTCC	MAR; 1; 9	MAR; 2 DNS	FRA; 1; 7	FRA; 2; 8	HUN; 1; 6	HUN; 2; 10	SVK; 1; 3	SVK; 2 C	AUT; 1; 9	AUT; 2; 4	RUS; 1; 9	RUS; 2; 7	BEL; 1; 7	BEL; 2; 7	ARG; 1; 2	ARG; 2; 7	BEI; 1; 6	BEI; 2; 5	CHN; 1; 5	CHN; 2; 4	JPN; 1; 4	JPN; 2; 3	MAC; 1; 2	MAC; 2; 4	**2nd**	**710**
2014	Proteam Racing	25	(Morocco) **Mehdi Bennani**	Honda Civic WTCC	MAR; 1; 7	MAR; 2 DSQ	FRA; 1; 13	**FRA**; **2**; 5	HUN; 1; 5	HUN; 2 DNS	SVK; 1; 15	SVK; 2 C	AUT; 1; 7	AUT; 2; 8	RUS; 1; 11	RUS; 2; 3	BEL; 1; 13	BEL; 2; 11	ARG; 1; 9	ARG; 2; 8	BEI; 1; 9	BEI; 2 Ret	CHN; 1; 10	**CHN**; **2**; 1	JPN; 1; 11	JPN; 2 Ret	MAC; 1; 19†	MAC; 2 DNS	**2nd**	**710**
2015	Honda Racing Team JAS	2	(Italy) **Gabriele Tarquini**	Honda Civic WTCC	ARG; 1; 5	ARG; 2; 4	MAR; 1; 7	MAR; 2; 5	HUN; 1 DSQ	HUN; 2; 13	GER; 1; 6	GER; 2; 4	RUS; 1; 3	RUS; 2 Ret	SVK; 1; 6	SVK; 2; 4	FRA; 1; 8	FRA; 2; 5	POR; 1; 4	POR; 2; 3	JPN; 1; 3	JPN; 2; 12	CHN; 1 Ret	CHN; 2; 2	THA; 1; 5	THA; 2; 5	QAT; 1; 15	QAT; 2; 7	**2nd**	**721**
2015	Honda Racing Team JAS	18	(Portugal) **Tiago Monteiro**	Honda Civic WTCC	ARG; 1; 4	ARG; 2; 3	MAR; 1; 6	MAR; 2 Ret	HUN; 1; 5	HUN; 2; 4	GER; 1 Ret	**GER**; **2**; 3	RUS; 1; 8	**RUS**; **2**; 1	SVK; 1; 8	SVK; 2; 9	FRA; 1; 7	FRA; 2 Ret	POR; 1; 5	POR; 2 Ret	JPN; 1; 9	JPN; 2; 1	CHN; 1; 7	CHN; 2; 6	THA; 1; 7	THA; 2 DSQ	QAT; 1; 8	QAT; 2; 9	**2nd**	**721**
2015	Zengő Motorsport	5	(Hungary) **Norbert Michelisz**	Honda Civic WTCC	ARG; 1; 6	ARG; 2; 7	MAR; 1; 8	MAR; 2; 11	HUN; 1; 8	**HUN**; **2**; 1	GER; 1; 4	GER; 2 Ret	RUS; 1; 7	RUS; 2; 3	SVK; 1 Ret	SVK; 2; 8	FRA; 1; 6	FRA; 2; 2	POR; 1; 3	POR; 2; 4	**JPN**; **1**; 2	JPN; 2; 14†	CHN; 1; 6	CHN; 2; 11	THA; 1 Ret	**THA**; **2**; 12	QAT; 1; 7	QAT; 2; 3	**2nd**	**721**
2016	Castrol Honda World Touring Car Team	12	(United Kingdom) **Robert Huff**	Honda Civic WTCC	FRA; 1; 1	FRA; 2; 6	SVK; 1; 3	SVK; 2; 14	HUN; 1; 10	HUN; 2; 6	MAR; 1 DSQ	**MAR**; **2** DSQ	GER; 1; 4	GER; 2; 4	RUS; 1; 7	RUS; 2; 4	POR; 1; 6	POR; 2; 4	ARG; 1; 2	ARG; 2; 3	JPN; 1; 2	JPN; 2; 9	CHN; 1; 9	CHN; 2; 13	QAT; 1; 3	QAT; 2; 8			**2nd**	**675**
2016	Castrol Honda World Touring Car Team	18	(Portugal) **Tiago Monteiro**	Honda Civic WTCC	FRA; 1; 4	FRA; 2; 2	SVK; 1; 1	SVK; 2; 2	HUN; 1; 11	HUN; 2; 3	MAR; 1 DSQ	MAR; 2 DSQ	**GER**; **1** Ret	GER; 2 DNS	**RUS**; **1**; 6	RUS; 2; 5	POR; 1; 10	**POR**; **2**; 1	ARG; 1; 4	ARG; 2; 4	JPN; 1; 3	JPN; 2; 3	CHN; 1; 10	CHN; 2; 8	QAT; 1 Ret	QAT; 2; 5			**2nd**	**675**
2016	Honda Racing Team JAS	5	(Hungary) **Norbert Michelisz**	Honda Civic WTCC	FRA; 1; 3	FRA; 2; 3	SVK; 1; 6	SVK; 2; 4	HUN; 1 DNS	HUN; 2; 10	MAR; 1 DSQ	MAR; 2 DSQ	GER; 1; 3	GER; 2; 2	RUS; 1; 10	RUS; 2; 3	POR; 1; 8	POR; 2; 3	ARG; 1; 6	ARG; 2; 8	**JPN**; **1**; 1	JPN; 2; 8	CHN; 1; 2	CHN; 2; 11	QAT; 1; 5	QAT; 2; 4			**2nd**	**675**
2017	Honda Racing Team JAS	2	(Italy) **Gabriele Tarquini**	Honda Civic WTCC	MAR; 1	MAR; 2	ITA; 1	ITA; 2	HUN; 1	HUN; 2	GER; 1	GER; 2	POR; 1	POR; 2	ARG; 1	ARG; 2	CHN; 1 DSQ	CHN; 2 DSQ	JPN; 1	JPN; 2	MAC; 1	MAC; 2	QAT; 1	QAT; 2					2nd	880
2017	Honda Racing Team JAS	5	(Hungary) **Norbert Michelisz**	Honda Civic WTCC	MAR; 1; 5	MAR; 2; 2	ITA; 1 NC	ITA; 2; 6	HUN; 1 NC	HUN; 2; 4	GER; 1; 7	**GER**; **2**; 2	POR; 1; 7	**POR**; **2**; 1	ARG; 1; 14	ARG; 2; 1	CHN; 1 DSQ	CHN; 2 DSQ	JPN; 1; 7	**JPN**; **2**; 1	MAC; 1; 5	MAC; 2; 2	QAT; 1; 9	QAT; 2; 8					2nd	880
2017	Honda Racing Team JAS	18	(Portugal) **Tiago Monteiro**	Honda Civic WTCC	MAR; 1; 6	**MAR**; **2**; 1	ITA; 1; 3	ITA; 2; 2	HUN; 1; 1	HUN; 2; 5	GER; 1; 15	GER; 2; 13	POR; 1; 2	POR; 2; 3	ARG; 1; 5	ARG; 2; 2	CHN; 1	CHN; 2	JPN; 1	JPN; 2	MAC; 1	MAC; 2	QAT; 1	QAT; 2					2nd	880
2017	Honda Racing Team JAS	34	(Japan) **Ryo Michigami**	Honda Civic WTCC	MAR; 1 Ret	MAR; 2; 10	ITA; 1 Ret	ITA; 2 Ret	HUN; 1; 11	HUN; 2; 13	GER; 1; 11	GER; 2 Ret	**POR**; **1** Ret	POR; 2; 13	ARG; 1; 10	ARG; 2; 11	CHN; 1 DSQ	CHN; 2 DSQ	JPN; 1; 10	JPN; 2 Ret	MAC; 1; 3	MAC; 2; 15	QAT; 1; 14	QAT; 2; 10					2nd	880
2017	Honda Racing Team JAS	86	(Argentina) **Esteban Guerrieri**	Honda Civic WTCC	MAR; 1	MAR; 2	ITA; 1	ITA; 2	HUN; 1	HUN; 2	GER; 1	GER; 2	POR; 1	POR; 2	ARG; 1	ARG; 2	CHN; 1	CHN; 2	JPN; 1; 3	JPN; 2; 4	MAC; 1; 6	MAC; 2; 4	QAT; 1; 10	**QAT**; **2**; 1					2nd	880

^{†}Did not finish the race, but was classified as he completed over 90% of the race distance.

== See also ==
- Honda in motorsport
