= Peugeot 301 (2012) =

Subcompact car, produced by Peugeot

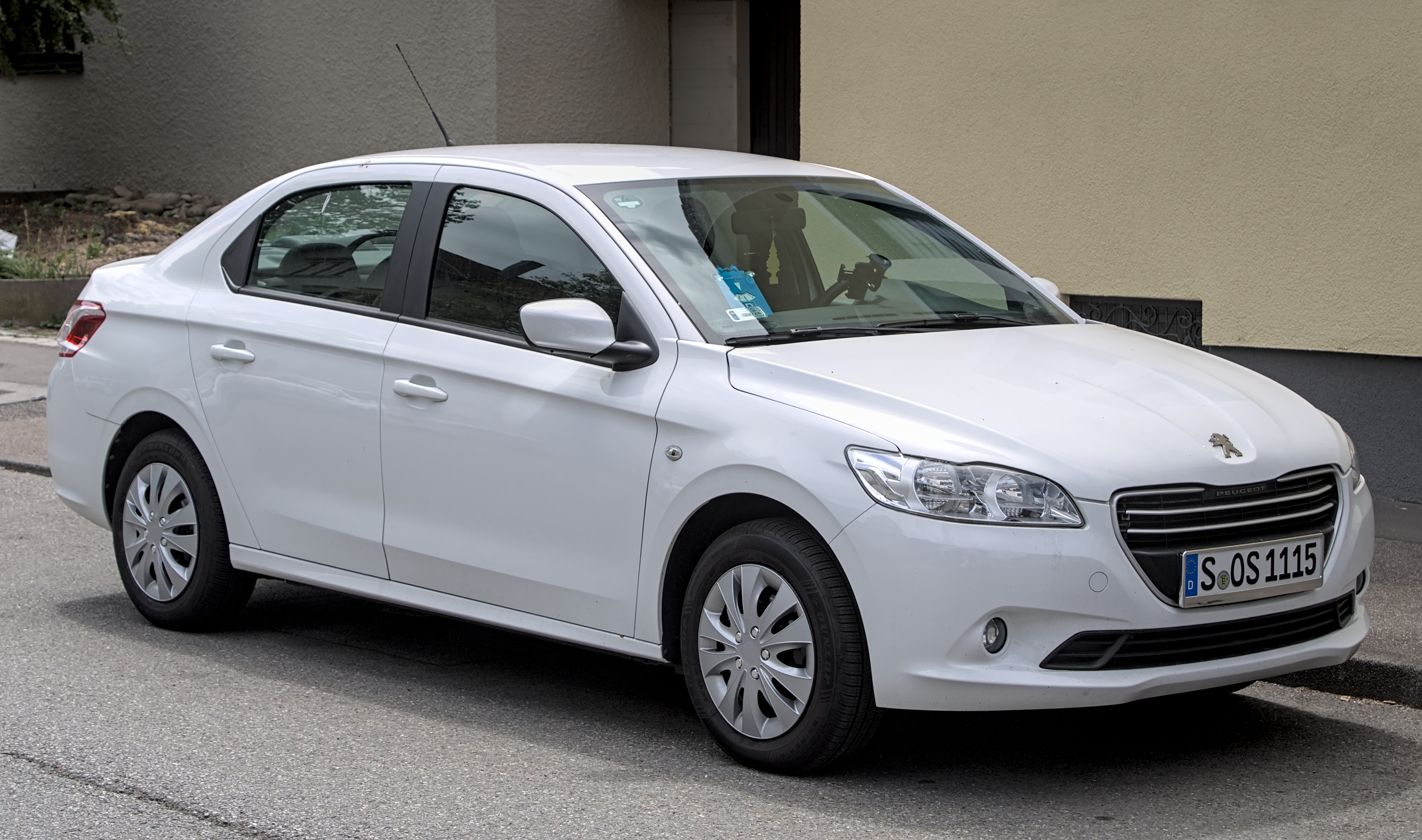

Overview
- Manufacturer: Peugeot (Note: PSA Group (2012–2021); Stellantis (2021))
- Also called: Citroën C-Elysée; IKCO Tara
- Production: 2012–2021
- Assembly: China: Wuhan (DPCA); Spain: Vigo (PSA Vigo Plant); Iran: Tehran (IKAP); Nigeria: Kaduna (Peugeot Automobiles Nigeria); Kazakhstan: Kostanay (Saryarka AvtoProm)

Body and chassis
- Class: Subcompact car (B)
- Body style: 4-door saloon
- Layout: Front-engine, front-wheel-drive
- Platform: PSA PF1 platform
- Related: Peugeot 207; Peugeot 208; Citroën C3 (2009); Citroën DS3; IKCO Tara

Powertrain
- Engine: Petrol: 1.2 L EB2M/EB2F VTi/PureTech I3; 1.6 L EC5FNFP VTi I4; Diesel: 1.5 L DV5RD BlueHDi I4; 1.6 L DV6DTED/DV6FDTED HDi/BlueHDi I4
- Transmission: 5 or 6-speed manual 4-speed automatic 5-speed semi-automatic

Dimensions
- Wheelbase: 2,655 mm (104.5 in)
- Length: 4,442 mm (174.9 in)
- Width: 1,748 mm (68.8 in)
- Height: 1,446 mm (56.9 in)
- Kerb weight: 1,055–1,165 kg (2,326–2,568 lb)

Chronology
- Predecessor: Peugeot 206/207 sedan

The Peugeot 301 is a subcompact (B-segment) sedan produced by the French automaker Peugeot from 2012 to 2021. It was announced to the public in May 2012, with an official launch that took place at the Paris Motor Show in September. The 301 is built at Peugeot's Vigo plant in Spain, alongside its twin Citroën C-Elysée, and has been manufactured in China since November 2013. It is also assembled as a CKD in other markets, such as Kazakhstan and Nigeria.

Sales of the 301 commenced in November 2012, initially in Turkey, and later in other markets in Western Asia (Taiwan since 2016), Africa, Latin America, Central Europe, Eastern Europe and Greece. Designed specifically for emerging markets, the 301 is not sold in core Western European markets (with the exception of French Overseas Departments/Regions and Collectivities) or RHD markets.

== Specification ==
The 301 is powered by a range of five engines: a three-cylinder 1.2-litre VTi petrol engine shared with the Peugeot 208, producing 71 bhp (53 kW; 72 PS); a 1.2 PureTech with 81 bhp (60 kW; 82 PS) ; a 1.6 VTi petrol with 114 bhp (85 kW; 116 PS) the only engine with automatic transmission.

Diesel engines available are, a 1.6 HDi with 91 bhp (68 kW; 92 PS) and a 1.5 and 1.6 BlueHDi delivering 99 bhp (74 kW; 100 PS), both mated only to a 5-speed manual gearbox.

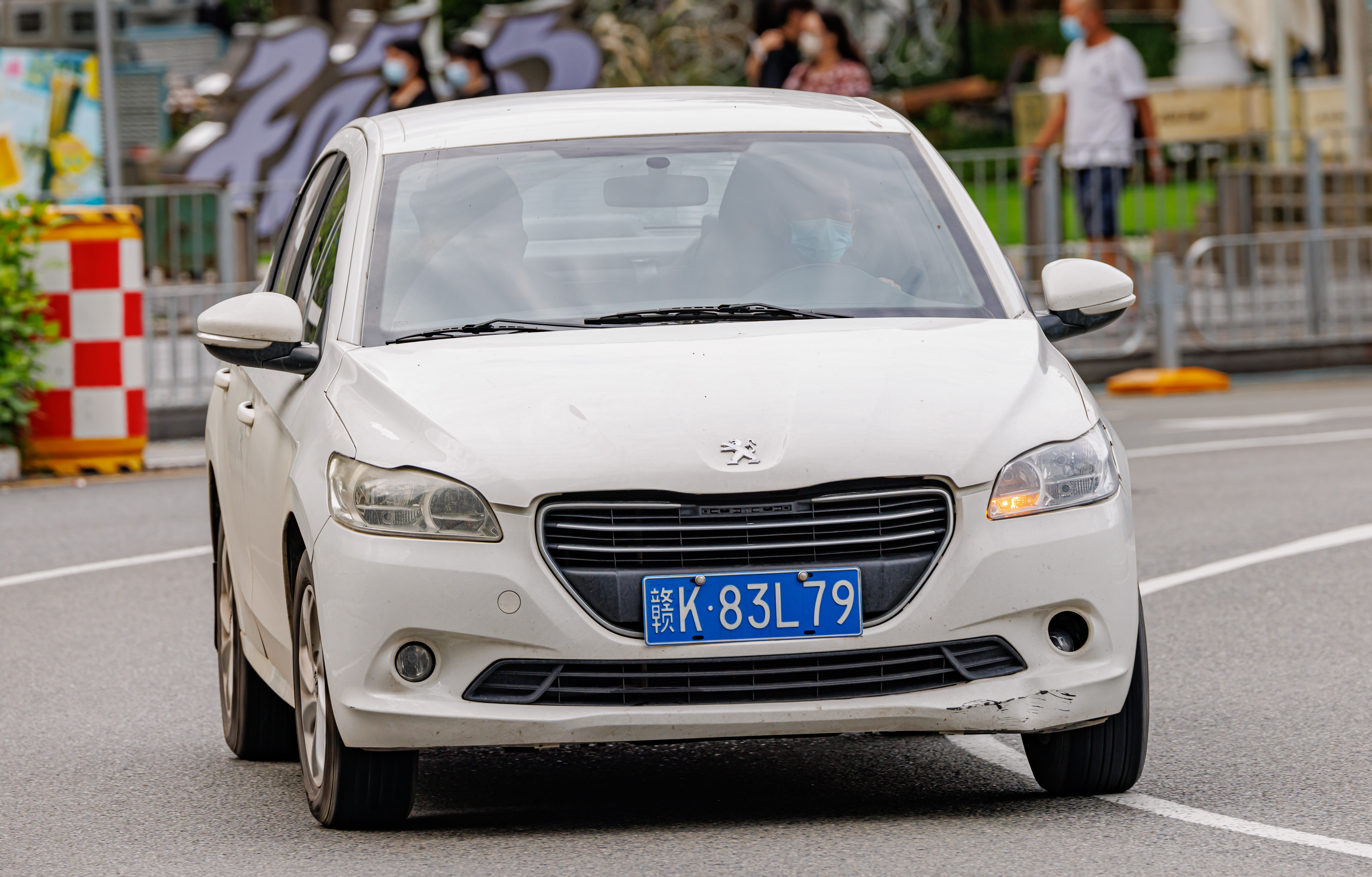
Peugeot 301 (China, Pre-facelift)

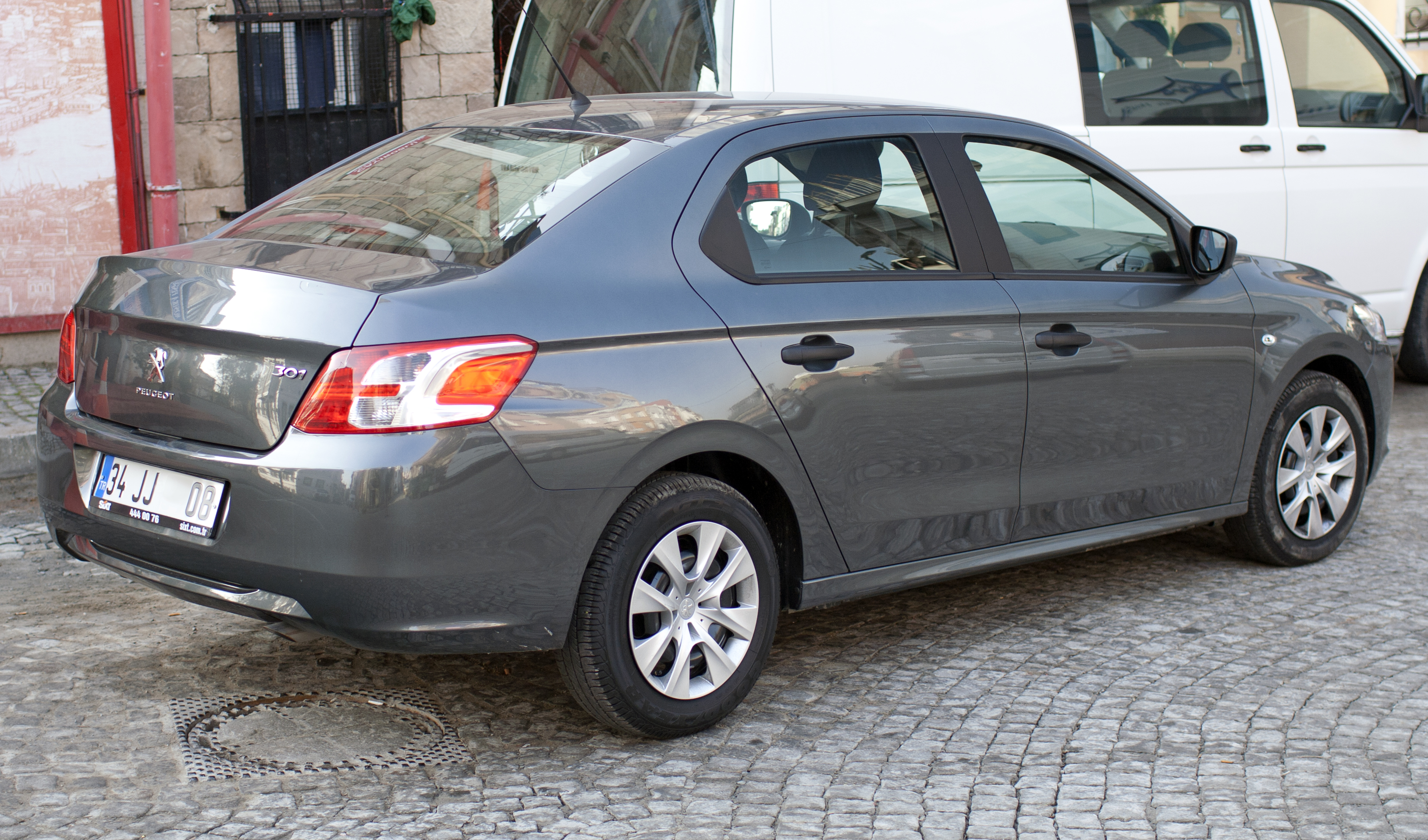
Peugeot 301 Rear (Turkey, Pre-facelift)

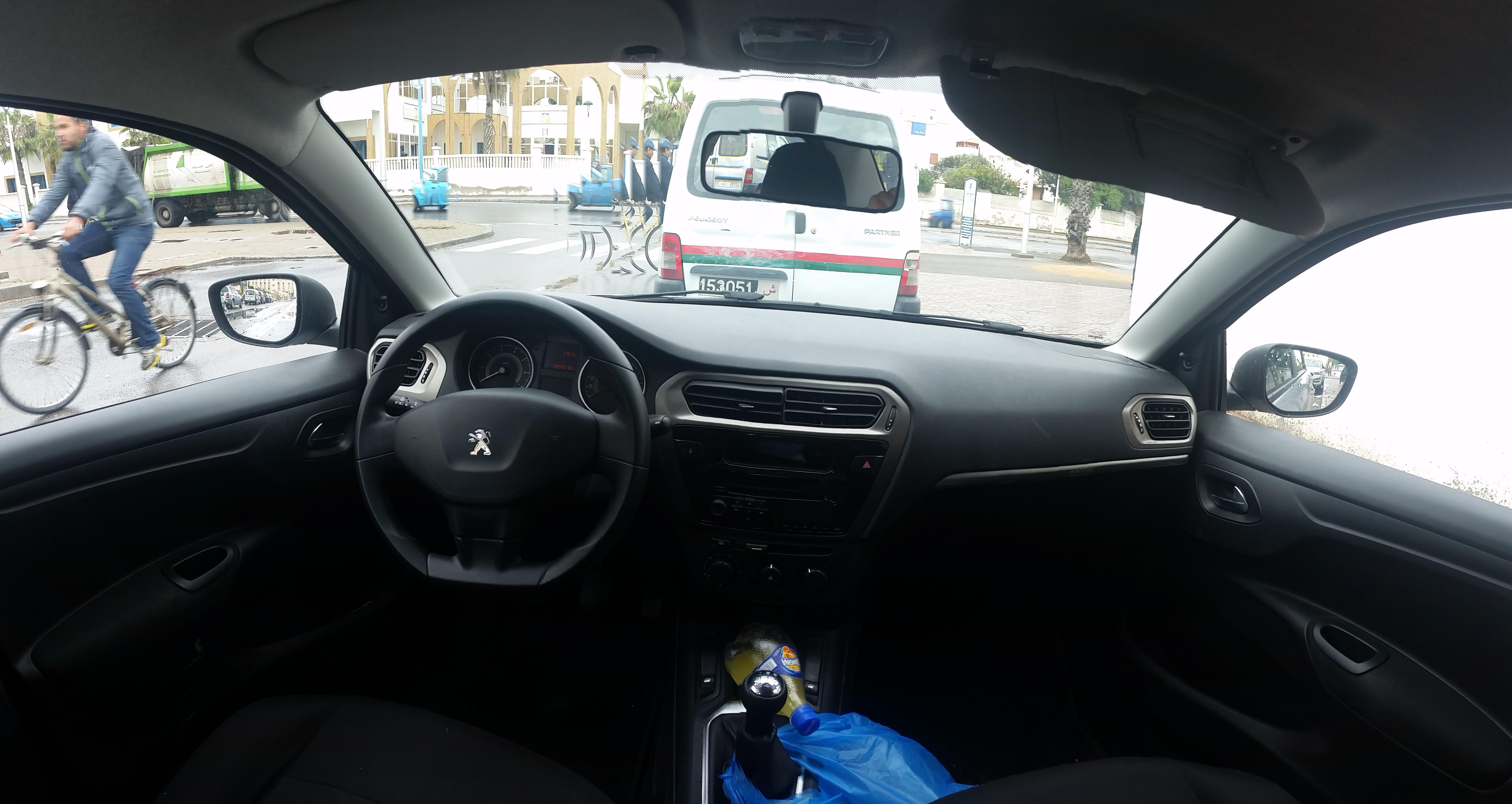
Interior

== Name ==
The model's 301 name was first used on a 1932 Peugeot 301, and the new 301 is the first Peugeot to start the revised naming strategy of using x01 and x08 to denote emerging market models and traditional market models.

== 2017 facelift ==
In 2017, the Peugeot 301 received a facelift alongside its twin sister C-Elysée, the new front fascia includes a modification of the headlamps, a new grille on which displays the Peugeot logo instead of the bonnet, and DRLs (Daytime Running Lights).

The new facelift also added as an option a touchscreen multimedia radio with Android Auto and Apple CarPlay.

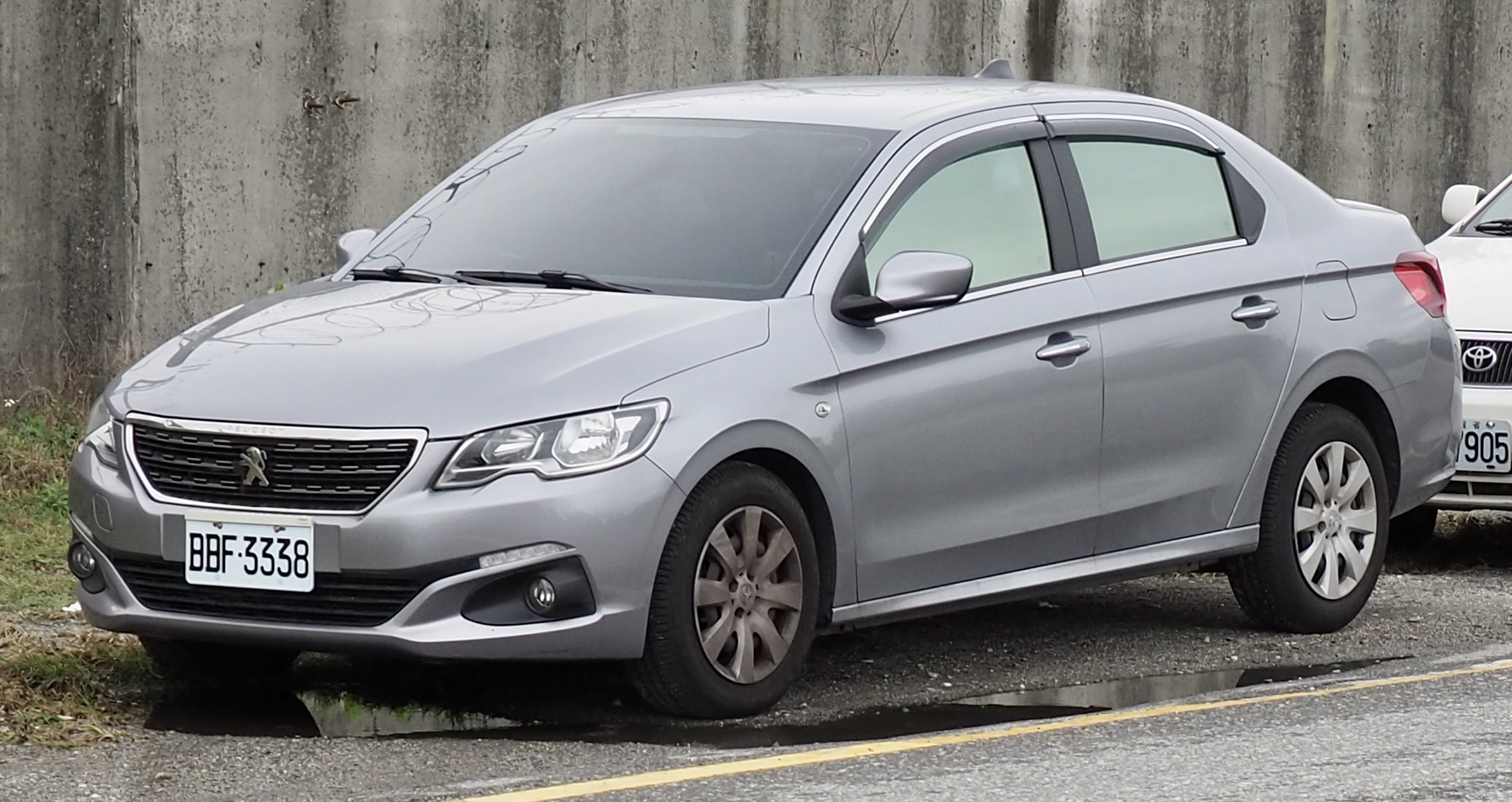
Facelift

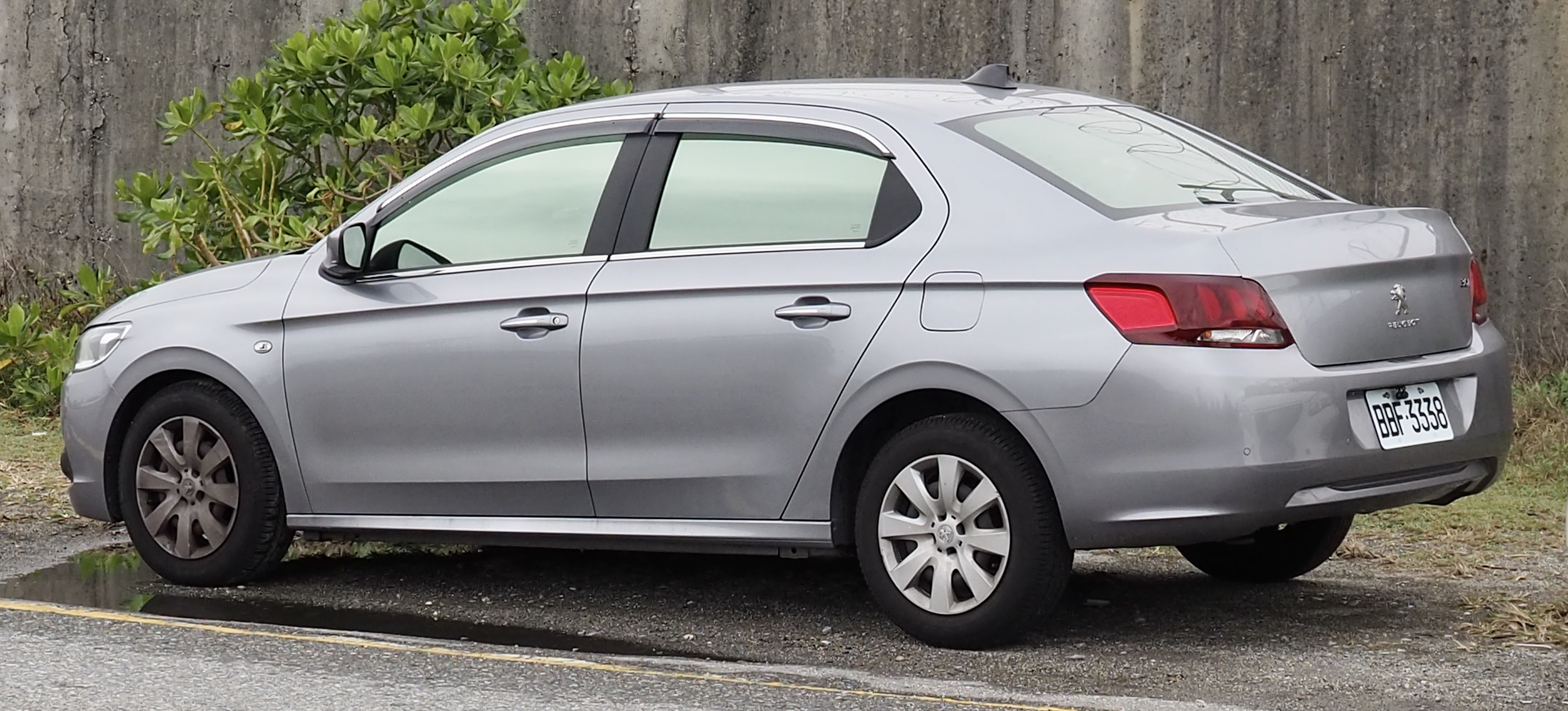
Facelift rear

== Variants ==
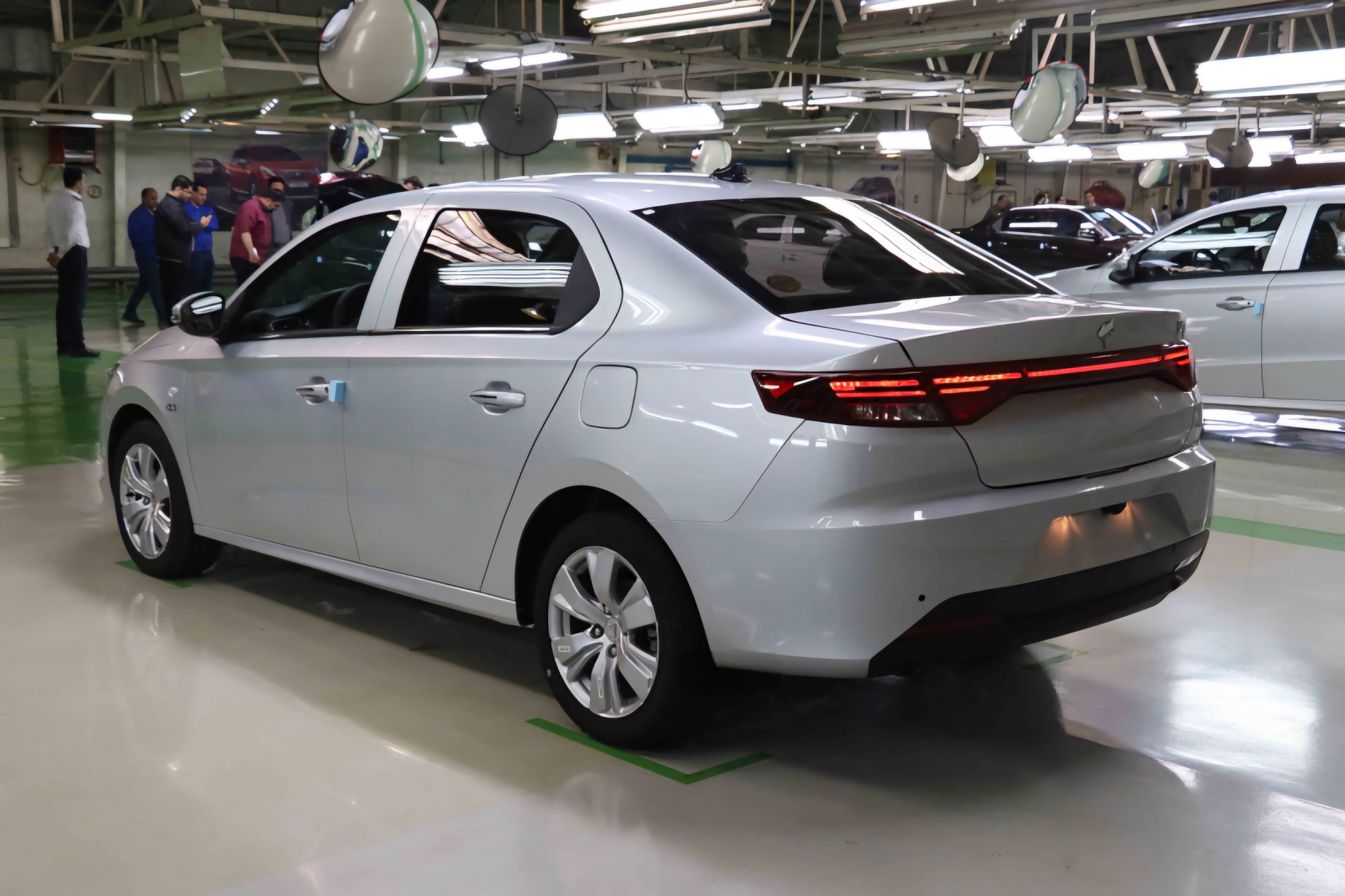
IKCO Tara

=== Citroën C-Elysée ===
A similar model to the 301, badged as a Citroën C-Elysée, was also launched at the Paris Motor Show in 2012.

=== IKCO Tara ===
In 2016, after the JCPOA was announced, Iran Khodro and PSA intended to jointly produce the Peugeot 301, Peugeot 208 and Peugeot 2008 as the IKAP (Iran Khodro Automobile Peugeot) joint venture. After the return of sanctions by the United States in 2018, Peugeot left Iran and IKAP was suspended. As a result, Iran Khodro modified Peugeot 301 to produce it indigenously and the result was IKCO Tara, which was unveiled for the first time on February 19, 2020.

== Safety ==
It has front disc brakes.

=== Latin NCAP ===
The Spanish-made 301 in its most basic Latin American market configuration with 4 airbags received 3 stars for adult occupants and 3 stars for toddlers from Latin NCAP 2.0 in 2019.

Latin NCAP 2.0 test results Peugeot 301 + 4 Airbags (2019, based on Euro NCAP 2008)
Test	Points	Stars
Adult occupant:	23.26/34.0	3 /5 stars
Child occupant:	34.10/49.00	3 /5 stars

=== Euro NCAP ===
The 301 in its standard European market configuration received 3 stars from Euro NCAP in 2014.

2014 Peugeot 301
Euro NCAP scores (2014)
Overall	3/5 stars

== Sales and production ==
=== 301 ===
Year	Worldwide Production	Worldwide sales	Notes
2012	11,600	4,800	Total production reaches 11,600 units.
2013	76,900	72,200	Total production reaches 88,400 units.
2014	107,000	100,000	Total production reaches 195,400 units.
2015	102,869	TBA	
2016	102,105	TBA	

=== C-Elysée ===
Year	Worldwide Production	Worldwide sales	Notes
2012	7,000	5,600	Total production reaches 7,000 units.
2013	59,400	56,200	Total production reaches 66,400 units.
2014	123,100	110,000	Total production reaches 189,500 units.
