= 2001 European Super Touring Championship =

Sports season

Seasons
- ← 2000 2002 →

The 2001 FIA European Super Touring Championship was the 28th season of European touring car racing and the first European Touring Car Championship since 1988. The championship started at Monza on 1 April and ended after ten events at Estoril on 21 October. The championship was won by Fabrizio Giovanardi, who drove for Alfa Romeo Team Nordauto in an Alfa Romeo 156. A secondary championship for Super Production cars was run alongside the ETCC and was won by Peter Kox driving for Ravaglia Motorsport in a BMW 320i.

== Teams and drivers ==
=== Super Touring ===
Team	Car	No.	Drivers	Rounds	Class
(Italy) Alfa Romeo Team Nordauto	Alfa Romeo 156	1	(Italy) Fabrizio Giovanardi	All	
(Italy) Alfa Romeo Team Nordauto	Alfa Romeo 156	2	(Italy) Nicola Larini	All	
(Italy) Alfa Romeo Team Nordauto	Alfa Romeo 156	3	(Italy) Romana Bernardoni	1–9	
(Italy) Alfa Romeo Team Nordauto	Alfa Romeo 156	3	(France) Yvan Muller	10	
(Italy) Alfa Romeo Team Nordauto	Alfa Romeo 156	31	(Brazil) Felipe Massa	9–10	
(Italy) JAS Engineering Italia IP	Honda Accord	4	(Italy) Gabriele Tarquini	All	
(Italy) JAS Engineering Italia IP	Honda Accord	5	(France) Fabrice Walfisch	All	
(Italy) JAS Engineering Italia IP	Honda Accord	6	(United Kingdom) James Thompson	9–10	
(Italy) AGS Motorsport	Audi A4 quattro	7	(Italy) Roberto Colciago	All	
(Italy) AGS Motorsport	Audi A4 quattro	8	(Italy) Max Pigoli	1–9	A
(Italy) AGS Motorsport	Audi A4 quattro	8	(Italy) Alberto Radaelli	10	A
(Italy) Conrero	Alfa Romeo 156	9	(Italy) Angelo Lancelotti	All	A
(Italy) Conrero	Alfa Romeo 156	10	(Italy) Enrico Toccacelo	1–6	A
(Italy) Conrero	Alfa Romeo 156	10	(Italy) Salvatore Deplano	7	A
(Italy) Conrero	Alfa Romeo 156	10	(Italy) Giovanni Gulinelli	8–9	A
(Italy) Conrero	Alfa Romeo 156	10	(Italy) Ettore Bonaldi	10	A
(Italy) Greyhound Motorsport	Opel Vectra	11	(Italy) Gianluca Roda	1–6, 8	A
(Italy) Racing Box	Audi A4 quattro	12	(Italy) Sergio Sambataro	1–4, 6–7, 9–10	A
(Germany) Symanzick Motorsport	Opel Vectra	14	(Germany) Heinrich Symanzick	All	A
(Italy) Max Team	BMW 320i	15	(Italy) Paolo Zadra	All	A
(Italy) Max Team	BMW 320i	16	(France) Éric Cayrolle	All	A
(United Kingdom) PRO Motorsport	Nissan Primera GT	18	(Italy) Sandro Sardelli	All	A
(Finland) Lehtonen Motorsport	Audi A4 quattro	19	(Finland) Mikko Lempinen	2–10	A
(Italy) GDL Racing	BMW 320i	20	(Italy) Gianluca de Lorenzi	1–5, 7–10	A
(Italy) GDL Racing	BMW 320i	21	(Italy) Moreno Soli	6–9	
(Italy) GDL Racing	BMW 320i	21	(Portugal) Nelson Clemente	10	
(Italy) GDL Racing	BMW 320i	30	(San Marino) Stefano Valli	7, 10	
(Italy) Materia Motorsport	BMW 320i	22	(Italy) Antonio Materia	1	
(Italy) P.S.G.R. - Nath Racing	Audi A4 quattro	23	(Italy) Guido Lucchetti Cigarini	1–3	
Volvo S40 Racing Team Sweden	Volvo S40	24	(Sweden) Jan 'Flash' Nilsson	1, 10	
Volvo S40 Racing Team Sweden	Volvo S40	25	(Sweden) Jens Edman	10	
(Sweden) Crawford Nissan Racing	Nissan Primera GT	26	(Sweden) Carl Rosenblad	9–10	
(Sweden) Crawford Nissan Racing	Nissan Primera GT	27	(Sweden) Marcus Gustavsson	9–10	
(United Kingdom) RJN Motorsport	Nissan Primera GT	29	(United Kingdom) Matt Neal	3–6, 8–10	
(Sweden) Brovallen Motorsport	Audi A4 quattro	32	(Sweden) Tobias Johansson	10	

Icon	Class
A	Amateur

=== Super Production ===
Team	Car	No.	Drivers	Rounds	Class
(Italy) Ravaglia Motorsport	BMW 320i	1	(Netherlands) Peter Kox	All	
(Italy) Ravaglia Motorsport	BMW 320i	2	(Germany) Norman Simon	All	U
(United Kingdom) RJN Motorsport	Nissan Primera	3	(Norway) Tommy Rustad	All	
(United Kingdom) RJN Motorsport	Nissan Primera	4	(United Kingdom) Matt Kelly	4	
(United Kingdom) RJN Motorsport	Nissan Primera	4	(Italy) Simone di Luca	6-10	U
(Italy) CiBiEmme Team	BMW 320i	5	(Italy) Gianni Morbidelli	All	
(Italy) CiBiEmme Team	BMW 320i	6	(Italy) Stefano Gabellini	All	
(Italy) CiBiEmme Team	BMW 320i	7	(Italy) Paolo Ruberti	All	
(United Kingdom) Edenbridge Racing	BMW 320i	10	(United Kingdom) James Hanson	All	U
(United Kingdom) Edenbridge Racing	BMW 320i	11	(United Kingdom) Tom Ferrier	All	U
(Netherlands) Carly Motorsport	BMW 320i	12	(Sweden) Peggen Andersson	All	
(Netherlands) Carly Motorsport	BMW 320i	14	(Netherlands) Duncan Huisman	All	
(Netherlands) Carly Motorsport	BMW 320i	15	(Belgium) Guino Kenis	1, 3	
(Netherlands) Carly Motorsport	BMW 320i	15	(Belgium) Patrick Beliën	2, 10	
(Netherlands) Carly Motorsport	BMW 320i	15	(Belgium) Frédéric Bouvy	4-5	
(Netherlands) Carly Motorsport	BMW 320i	15	(Belgium) Peter Beckers	6, 9	
(Netherlands) Carly Motorsport	BMW 320i	15	(Belgium) Jean-Michel Martin	7-8	
(Netherlands) Carly Motorsport	BMW 320i	38	(Netherlands) Tom Coronel	10	
(Netherlands) Carly Motorsport	BMW 320i	39	(Netherlands) Sandor van Es	10	
(Italy) Tobia Masini	Alfa Romeo 156	16	(Italy) Tobia Masini	All	U
(Spain) Club Jarama RACE	Alfa Romeo 156	18	(Spain) Luis Villamil	All	
(Italy) Conrero	Alfa Romeo 147	20	(Italy) Ettore Bonaldi	1–7, 9	
(Italy) Conrero	Alfa Romeo 147	20	(Italy) Romana Bernardoni	10	
(Italy) Conrero	Alfa Romeo 147	21	(Italy) Fulvio Cavicchi	2-8	U
(Italy) Conrero	Alfa Romeo 147	21	(Italy) Salvatore Tavano	9-10	U
(Italy) Scuderia Veregra	Peugeot 306 GTi	22	(Italy) Riccardo Tarabelli	1	
(Italy) Scuderia Veregra	Alfa Romeo 156	23	(Italy) Giacomo Bertola	1	
(Lithuania) Oktanas	Honda Integra Type-R	25	(Lithuania) Egidijus Dapsas	2	
(Italy) Autofficina Rally	Peugeot 306 GTi	27	(Italy) Andrea Bacci	7	
(Italy) Autofficina Rally	Peugeot 306 GTi	28	(Italy) Alberto Viglione	7	
(Netherlands) Renault Dealer Team Holland	Renault Clio RS	29	(Netherlands) Frans Verschuur	10	
(Netherlands) Renault Dealer Team Holland	Renault Clio RS	30	(Netherlands) Donald Molenaar	10	
(Germany) Engstler Centro Sportivo	Alfa Romeo 147	31	(Germany) Franz Engstler	8	
(Germany) Engstler Centro Sportivo	Alfa Romeo 156	32	(Germany) Andreas Klinge	8	
(Italy) GDL Racing	Honda Integra Type-R	35	(Finland) Markus Palttala	5-8	U
(United Kingdom) GA Racing	Alfa Romeo 156	36	(Sweden) Benny Larsson	10	
(United Kingdom) GA Racing	Alfa Romeo 156	37	(United Kingdom) Alan Blencowe	10	

Icon	Class
U	Under 25

== Results and standings ==
=== Races ===
Round		Circuit	Date	Pole position	Fastest lap	Winning driver	Winning team	Winning amateur/ under 25
1	ST1	(Italy) Autodromo Nazionale Monza	1 April	(Italy) Gabriele Tarquini	(Italy) Nicola Larini	(Italy) Nicola Larini	Alfa Romeo Team Nordauto	(Italy) Sandro Sardelli
1	ST2	(Italy) Autodromo Nazionale Monza	1 April		(Italy) Gabriele Tarquini	(Italy) Gabriele Tarquini	JAS Engineering Italia IP	(Italy) Sandro Sardelli
1	SP1	(Italy) Autodromo Nazionale Monza	1 April	(Italy) Gianni Morbidelli	(Netherlands) Peter Kox	(Netherlands) Peter Kox	Ravaglia Motorsport	(Germany) Norman Simon
2	ST3	(Czech Republic) Brno Circuit	16 April	(Italy) Fabrizio Giovanardi	(Italy) Gabriele Tarquini	(Italy) Nicola Larini	Alfa Romeo Team Nordauto	(Italy) Max Pigoli
2	ST4	(Czech Republic) Brno Circuit	16 April		(Italy) Nicola Larini	(Italy) Fabrizio Giovanardi	Alfa Romeo Team Nordauto	(Italy) Sandro Sardelli
2	SP2	(Czech Republic) Brno Circuit	16 April	(Netherlands) Peter Kox	(Netherlands) Peter Kox	(Netherlands) Peter Kox	Ravaglia Motorsport	(Germany) Norman Simon
3	ST5	(France) Circuit de Nevers Magny-Cours	1 May	(Italy) Nicola Larini	(Italy) Gabriele Tarquini	(Italy) Gabriele Tarquini	JAS Engineering Italia IP	(Italy) Max Pigoli
3	ST6	(France) Circuit de Nevers Magny-Cours	1 May		(Italy) Nicola Larini	(Italy) Roberto Colciago	AGS Motorsport	(Italy) Gianluca de Lorenzi
3	SP3	(France) Circuit de Nevers Magny-Cours	1 May	(Netherlands) Duncan Huisman	(Netherlands) Duncan Huisman	(Netherlands) Duncan Huisman	Carly Motorsport	(Italy) Fulvio Cavicchi
4	ST7	(United Kingdom) Silverstone Circuit	13 May	(Italy) Gabriele Tarquini	(Italy) Gabriele Tarquini	(Italy) Gabriele Tarquini	JAS Engineering Italia IP	(Italy) Sandro Sardelli
4	ST8	(United Kingdom) Silverstone Circuit	13 May		(Italy) Fabrizio Giovanardi	(Italy) Gabriele Tarquini	JAS Engineering Italia IP	(Italy) Sandro Sardelli
4	SP4	(United Kingdom) Silverstone Circuit	13 May	(Netherlands) Peter Kox	(Germany) Norman Simon	(Netherlands) Peter Kox	Ravaglia Motorsport	(Germany) Norman Simon
5	ST9	(Belgium) Circuit Zolder	20 May	(Italy) Gabriele Tarquini	(Italy) Gabriele Tarquini	(Italy) Gabriele Tarquini	JAS Engineering Italia IP	(Italy) Gianluca de Lorenzi
5	ST10	(Belgium) Circuit Zolder	20 May		(Italy) Gabriele Tarquini	(Italy) Fabrizio Giovanardi	Alfa Romeo Team Nordauto	(Italy) Sandro Sardelli
5	SP5	(Belgium) Circuit Zolder	20 May	(Netherlands) Peter Kox	(Germany) Norman Simon	(Netherlands) Duncan Huisman	Carly Motorsport	(Germany) Norman Simon
6	ST11	(Hungary) Hungaroring	1 July	(Italy) Fabrizio Giovanardi	(Italy) Roberto Colciago	(Italy) Fabrizio Giovanardi	Alfa Romeo Team Nordauto	(France) Éric Cayrolle
6	ST12	(Hungary) Hungaroring	1 July		(Italy) Roberto Colciago	(Italy) Roberto Colciago	AGS Motorsport	(Italy) Sandro Sardelli
6	SP6	(Hungary) Hungaroring	1 July	(Netherlands) Duncan Huisman	(Netherlands) Peter Kox	(Netherlands) Duncan Huisman	Carly Motorsport	(United Kingdom) Tom Ferrier
7	ST13	(Austria) A1-Ring	26 August	(Italy) Gabriele Tarquini	(Italy) Gabriele Tarquini (Italy) Nicola Larini	(Italy) Gabriele Tarquini	JAS Engineering Italia IP	(Italy) Gianluca de Lorenzi
7	ST14	(Austria) A1-Ring	26 August		(Italy) Gabriele Tarquini	(Italy) Gabriele Tarquini	JAS Engineering Italia IP	(Italy) Gianluca de Lorenzi
7	SP7	(Austria) A1-Ring	26 August	(Norway) Tommy Rustad	(Norway) Tommy Rustad	(Germany) Norman Simon	Ravaglia Motorsport	(Germany) Norman Simon
8	ST15	(Germany) Nürburgring	9 September	(Italy) Gabriele Tarquini	(United Kingdom) Matt Neal	(Italy) Nicola Larini	Alfa Romeo Team Nordauto	(Italy) Sandro Sardelli
8	ST16	(Germany) Nürburgring	9 September		(Italy) Gabriele Tarquini	(France) Fabrice Walfisch	JAS Engineering Italia IP	(Italy) Gianluca de Lorenzi
8	SP8	(Germany) Nürburgring	9 September	(Norway) Tommy Rustad	(Norway) Tommy Rustad	(Norway) Tommy Rustad	RJN Motorsport	(Germany) Norman Simon
9	ST17	(Spain) Circuito del Jarama	30 September	(Italy) Gabriele Tarquini	(Italy) Fabrizio Giovanardi	(Italy) Gabriele Tarquini	JAS Engineering Italia IP	(Italy) Gianluca de Lorenzi
9	ST18	(Spain) Circuito del Jarama	30 September		(Italy) Gabriele Tarquini	(Italy) Gabriele Tarquini	JAS Engineering Italia IP	(Italy) Gianluca de Lorenzi
9	SP9	(Spain) Circuito del Jarama	30 September	(Norway) Tommy Rustad	(Norway) Tommy Rustad	(Norway) Tommy Rustad	RJN Motorsport	(Italy) Tobia Masini
10	ST19	(Portugal) Autódromo do Estoril	21 October	(France) Yvan Muller	(France) Yvan Muller	(France) Yvan Muller	Alfa Romeo Team Nordauto	(Italy) Gianluca de Lorenzi
10	ST20	(Portugal) Autódromo do Estoril	21 October		(United Kingdom) James Thompson	(United Kingdom) Matt Neal	RJN Motorsport	(Italy) Paolo Zadra
10	SP10	(Portugal) Autódromo do Estoril	21 October	(Norway) Tommy Rustad	(Norway) Tommy Rustad	(Italy) Gianni Morbidelli	CiBiEmme Team	(United Kingdom) Tom Ferrier

== Round 1 (Italy) Monza ==
Qualifying Grid 1

Pos	No	Driver	Car	Lap Time
1	4	(Italy) Gabriele Tarquini	Honda Accord	1.54.676
2	2	(Italy) Nicola Larini	Alfa Romeo 156	1.55.434
3	1	(Italy) Fabrizio Giovanardi	Alfa Romeo 156	1.55.599
4	5	(France) Fabrice Walfisch	Honda Accord	1.56.752
5	7	(Italy) Roberto Colciago	Audi A4 Quattro	1.57.101
6	24	(Sweden) Jan 'Flash' Nilsson	Volvo S40	1.57.350
7	10	(Italy) Enrico Toccacelo	Alfa Romeo 156	1.58.323
8	18	(Italy) Sandro Sardelli	Nissan Primera GT	1.58.448
9	3	(Italy) Romana Bernardoni	Alfa Romeo 156	1.58.479
10	11	(Italy) Gianluca Roda	Opel Vectra	1.58.707
11	14	(Germany) Heinrich Symanzick	Opel Vectra	1.59.196
12	9	(Italy) Angelo Lancelotti	Alfa Romeo 156	1.59.256
13	15	(France) Eric Cayrolle	BMW 320i	1.59.646
14	20	(Italy) Gianluca De Lorenzi	BMW 320i	2.00.115
15	23	(Italy) Guido Lucchetti Cigarini	Audi A4 Quattro	2.02.456
16	15	(Italy) Paolo Zadra	BMW 320i	2.02.650
17	22	(Italy) Antonio Matera	BMW 320i	2.03.532
18	12	(Italy) Sergio Sambataro	Audi A4 Quattro	2.05.552
19	8	(Italy) Massimo Pigoli	Audi A4 Quattro	1.58.559 *

- Pigoli: times disallowed, for engine change

Race 1

Pos	No	Driver	Constructor	Time/Retired	Points
1	2	(Italy) Nicola Larini	Alfa Romeo 156	9 laps in 17:34.735	40
2	1	(Italy) Fabrizio Giovanardi	Alfa Romeo 156	+0.364s	35
3	7	(Italy) Roberto Colciago	Audi A4 Quattro	+7.094s	32
4	18	(Italy) Sandro Sardelli	Nissan Primera GT	+22.389s	30
5	5	(France) Fabrice Walfisch	Honda Accord	+22.955s	28
6	20	(Italy) Gianluca De Lorenzi	BMW 320i	+25.614s	26
7	8	(Italy) Massimo Pigoli	Audi A4 Quattro	+25.716s	24
8	3	(Italy) Romana Bernardoni	Alfa Romeo 156	+26.219s	23
9	9	(Italy) Angelo Lancelotti	Alfa Romeo 156	+26.578s'	22
10	15	(France) Eric Cayrolle	BMW 320i	+32.313s	21
11	14	(Germany) Heinrich Symanzick	Opel Vectra	+50.759s	20
12	12	(Italy) Sergio Sambataro	Audi A4 Quattro	+56.542s	19
13	15	(Italy) Paolo Zadra	BMW 320i	+57.706s	18
14	22	(Italy) Antonio Matera	BMW 320i	+1.11.392s	17
15	23	(Italy) Guido Lucchetti Cigarini	Audi A4 Quattro	+1.26.855s	16
16	24	(Sweden) Jan 'Flash' Nilsson	Volvo S40	+2 laps	15
17	10	(Italy) Enrico Toccacelo	Alfa Romeo 156	+2 laps	14
DNF	4	(Italy) Gabriele Tarquini	Honda Accord	+7 laps	
DNF	11	(Italy) Gianluca Roda	Opel Vectra	+9 laps	

- Sardelli: 10 seconds time penalty, for cutting a chicane

Grid 2

Pos	No	Driver	Car
1	24	(Sweden) Jan 'Flash' Nilsson	Volvo S40
2	23	(Italy) Guido Lucchetti Cigarini	Audi A4 Quattro
3	22	(Italy) Antonio Matera	BMW 320i
4	15	(Italy) Paolo Zadra	BMW 320i
5	12	(Italy) Sergio Sambataro	Audi A4 Quattro
6	14	(Germany) Heinrich Symanzick	Opel Vectra
7	15	(France) Eric Cayrolle	BMW 320i
8	9	(Italy) Angelo Lancelotti	Alfa Romeo 156
9	3	(Italy) Romana Bernardoni	Alfa Romeo 156
10	8	(Italy) Massimo Pigoli	Audi A4 Quattro
11	20	(Italy) Gianluca De Lorenzi	BMW 320i
12	5	(France) Fabrice Walfisch	Honda Accord
13	18	(Italy) Sandro Sardelli	Nissan Primera GT
14	7	(Italy) Roberto Colciago	Audi A4 Quattro
15	1	(Italy) Fabrizio Giovanardi	Alfa Romeo 156
16	2	(Italy) Nicola Larini	Alfa Romeo 156
17	11	(Italy) Gianluca Roda	Opel Vectra
PIT LANE	4	(Italy) Gabriele Tarquini*	Honda Accord
PIT LANE	10	(Italy) Enrico Toccacelo*	Alfa Romeo 156

- Starting from the pit lane, for neutralization of parc-fermé

Race 2

Pos	No	Driver	Constructor	Time/Retired	Points
1	4	(Italy) Gabriele Tarquini	Honda Accord	9 laps in 17:46.158	40
2	2	(Italy) Nicola Larini	Alfa Romeo 156	+0.985s	35
3	7	(Italy) Roberto Colciago	Audi A4 Quattro	+7.256s	32
4	1	(Italy) Fabrizio Giovanardi	Alfa Romeo 156	+8.990s	30
5	5	(France) Fabrice Walfisch	Honda Accord	+9.169s	28
6	18	(Italy) Sandro Sardelli	Nissan Primera GT	+23.035s	26
7	9	(Italy) Angelo Lancelotti	Alfa Romeo 156	+25.159s'	24
8	8	(Italy) Massimo Pigoli	Audi A4 Quattro	+26.467s	23
9	11	(Italy) Gianluca Roda	Opel Vectra	+45.466s	22
10	15	(Italy) Paolo Zadra	BMW 320i	+48.934s	21
11	14	(Germany) Heinrich Symanzick	Opel Vectra	+55.619s	20
12	22	(Italy) Antonio Matera	BMW 320i	+59.589s	19
13	10	(Italy) Enrico Toccacelo	Alfa Romeo 156	+1.34.116s	18
14	12	(Italy) Sergio Sambataro	Audi A4 Quattro	+1 lap	17
DNF	23	(Italy) Guido Lucchetti Cigarini	Audi A4 Quattro	+9 laps	
DNF	24	(Sweden) Jan 'Flash' Nilsson	Volvo S40	+9 laps	
DNF	3	(Italy) Romana Bernardoni	Alfa Romeo 156	+9 laps	
DNF	20	(Italy) Gianluca De Lorenzi	BMW 320i	+9 laps	
DNF	15	(France) Eric Cayrolle	BMW 320i	+9 laps	

- Sambataro: 20 seconds time penalty, for cutting a chicane

=== Championship standings after Round 1 ===
Drivers' Championship standings

Pos	Driver	Points
1	(Italy) Nicola Larini	75
2	(Italy) Fabrizio Giovanardi	65
3	(Italy) Roberto Colciago	64
4	(France) Fabrice Walfisch	56
4	(Italy) Sandro Sardelli	56

Teams' Championship standings

Pos	Constructor	Points
1	(Italy) Nordauto Engineering	140
2	(Italy) AGS Motorsport	111
3	(Italy) JAS Engineering Italia IP	96
4	(Italy) Conrero	68
5	(Italy) Max Team	60

== Round 2 (Czech Republic) Brno Circuit ==
Qualifying Grid 1

Pos	No	Driver	Car	Lap Time
1	1	(Italy) Fabrizio Giovanardi	Alfa Romeo 156	2.19.354
2	4	(Italy) Gabriele Tarquini	Honda Accord	2.20.356
3	7	(Italy) Roberto Colciago	Audi A4 Quattro	2.20.544
4	5	(France) Fabrice Walfisch	Honda Accord	2.20.787
5	18	(Italy) Sandro Sardelli	Nissan Primera GT	2.21.074
6	2	(Italy) Nicola Larini	Alfa Romeo 156	2.21.428
7	20	(Italy) Gianluca De Lorenzi	BMW 320i	2.22.445
8	3	(Italy) Romana Bernardoni	Alfa Romeo 156	2.22.659
9	15	(France) Eric Cayrolle	BMW 320i	2.24.042
10	19	(Finland) Mikko Lempinen	Audi A4 Quattro	2.25.372
11	14	(Germany) Heinrich Symanzick	Opel Vectra	2.25.478
12	11	(Italy) Gianluca Roda	Opel Vectra	2.25.969
13	15	(Italy) Paolo Zadra	BMW 320i	2.40.581
14	9	(Italy) Angelo Lancelotti	Alfa Romeo 156	no time
15	8	(Italy) Massimo Pigoli	Audi A4 Quattro	2.23.838 *
16	10	(Italy) Enrico Toccacelo	Alfa Romeo 156	2.23.936
17	23	(Italy) Guido Lucchetti Cigarini	Audi A4 Quattro	2.24.298
18	12	(Italy) Sergio Sambataro	Audi A4 Quattro	2.39.997

- Pigoli, Toccacelo, Lucchetti Cigarini and Sambataro: times disallowed, for engine change

Race 1

Pos	No	Driver	Constructor	Time/Retired	Points
1	2	(Italy) Nicola Larini	Alfa Romeo 156	10 laps in 24:25.193	40
2	1	(Italy) Fabrizio Giovanardi	Alfa Romeo 156	+0.367s	35
3	8	(Italy) Massimo Pigoli	Audi A4 Quattro	+54.616s	32
4	19	(Finland) Mikko Lempinen	Audi A4 Quattro	+1.07.362s	30
5	15	(France) Eric Cayrolle	BMW 320i	+1.12.982s	28
6	11	(Italy) Gianluca Roda	Opel Vectra	+1.48.058s	26
7	10	(Italy) Enrico Toccacelo	Alfa Romeo 156	+1.51.870s	24
8	12	(Italy) Sergio Sambataro	Audi A4 Quattro	+1.55.235s	23
9	3	(Italy) Romana Bernardoni	Alfa Romeo 156	+2.04.690s	22
10	15	(Italy) Paolo Zadra	BMW 320i	+1 lap	21
11	14	(Germany) Heinrich Symanzick	Opel Vectra	+1 lap	20
DSQ	9	(Italy) Angelo Lancelotti	Alfa Romeo 156	+1 lap	
DNF	5	(France) Fabrice Walfisch	Honda Accord	+5 laps	
DNF	7	(Italy) Roberto Colciago	Audi A4 Quattro	+6 laps	
DNF	4	(Italy) Gabriele Tarquini	Honda Accord	+6 laps	
DNF	23	(Italy) Guido Lucchetti Cigarini	Audi A4 Quattro	+10 laps	
DNF	18	(Italy) Sandro Sardelli	Nissan Primera GT	+10 laps	
DNS	20	(Italy) Gianluca De Lorenzi	BMW 320i		

- Lancelotti: excluded, for ignoring a black/orange flag

Grid 2

Pos	No	Driver	Car
1	14	(Germany) Heinrich Symanzick	Opel Vectra
2	15	(Italy) Paolo Zadra	BMW 320i
3	3	(Italy) Romana Bernardoni	Alfa Romeo 156
4	12	(Italy) Sergio Sambataro	Audi A4 Quattro
5	10	(Italy) Enrico Toccacelo	Alfa Romeo 156
6	11	(Italy) Gianluca Roda	Opel Vectra
7	15	(France) Eric Cayrolle	BMW 320i
8	19	(Finland) Mikko Lempinen	Audi A4 Quattro
9	8	(Italy) Massimo Pigoli	Audi A4 Quattro
10	1	(Italy) Fabrizio Giovanardi	Alfa Romeo 156
11	2	(Italy) Nicola Larini	Alfa Romeo 156
12	5	(France) Fabrice Walfisch	Honda Accord
13	23	(Italy) Guido Lucchetti Cigarini	Audi A4 Quattro
14	18	(Italy) Sandro Sardelli	Nissan Primera GT
15	20	(Italy) Gianluca De Lorenzi	BMW 320i
16	9	(Italy) Angelo Lancelotti	Alfa Romeo 156
PIT LANE	4	(Italy) Gabriele Tarquini*	Honda Accord
PIT LANE	7	(Italy) Roberto Colciago*	Audi A4 Quattro

- Starting from the pit lane, for neutralization of parc-fermé

Race 2

Pos	No	Driver	Constructor	Time/Retired	Points
1	1	(Italy) Fabrizio Giovanardi	Alfa Romeo 156	10 laps in 21:37.824	40
2	2	(Italy) Nicola Larini	Alfa Romeo 156	+3.484s	35
3	4	(Italy) Gabriele Tarquini	Honda Accord	+9.908s	32
4	18	(Italy) Sandro Sardelli	Nissan Primera GT	+17.341s	30
5	20	(Italy) Gianluca De Lorenzi	BMW 320i	+20.247s	28
6	5	(France) Fabrice Walfisch	Honda Accord	+21.422s	26
7	15	(France) Eric Cayrolle	BMW 320i	+36.688s	24
8	8	(Italy) Massimo Pigoli	Audi A4 Quattro	+36.971s	23
9	7	(Italy) Roberto Colciago	Audi A4 Quattro	+37.000s	22
10	10	(Italy) Enrico Toccacelo	Alfa Romeo 156	+40.916s	21
11	14	(Germany) Heinrich Symanzick	Opel Vectra	+42.033s	20
12	12	(Italy) Sergio Sambataro	Audi A4 Quattro	+47.053s	19
13	23	(Italy) Guido Lucchetti Cigarini	Audi A4 Quattro	+1.05.692s	18
14	15	(Italy) Paolo Zadra	BMW 320i	+1.35.746s	17
15	11	(Italy) Gianluca Roda	Opel Vectra	+1 lap	16
DNF	19	(Finland) Mikko Lempinen	Audi A4 Quattro	+4 laps	
DNF	3	(Italy) Romana Bernardoni	Alfa Romeo 156	+6 laps	
DNS	9	(Italy) Angelo Lancelotti	Alfa Romeo 156		

- Colciago: 20 seconds time penalty, for team working on the car in the pit-lane before the start

=== Championship standings after Round 2 ===
Drivers' Championship standings

Pos	Driver	Points
1	(Italy) Nicola Larini	150
2	(Italy) Fabrizio Giovanardi	140
3	(Italy) Massimo Pigoli	102
4	(Italy) Roberto Colciago	86
4	(Italy) Sandro Sardelli	86

Teams' Championship standings

Pos	Constructor	Points
1	(Italy) Nordauto Engineering	290
2	(Italy) AGS Motorsport	188
3	(Italy) JAS Engineering Italia IP	154
4	(Italy) Max Team	150
5	(Italy) Conrero	123

== Round 3 (France) Magny-Cours ==
Qualifying Grid 1

Pos	No	Driver	Car	Lap Time
1	2	(Italy) Nicola Larini	Alfa Romeo 156	1.44.656
2	15	(France) Eric Cayrolle	BMW 320i	1.45.171
3	7	(Italy) Roberto Colciago	Audi A4 Quattro	1.45.377
4	4	(Italy) Gabriele Tarquini	Honda Accord	1.45.664
5	29	(United Kingdom) Matt Neal	Nissan Primera GT	1.46.241
6	8	(Italy) Massimo Pigoli	Audi A4 Quattro	1.46.797
7	1	(Italy) Fabrizio Giovanardi	Alfa Romeo 156	1.46.872
8	9	(Italy) Angelo Lancelotti	Alfa Romeo 156	1.47.084
9	5	(France) Fabrice Walfisch	Honda Accord	1.47.172
10	18	(Italy) Sandro Sardelli	Nissan Primera GT	1.47.254
11	10	(Italy) Enrico Toccacelo	Alfa Romeo 156	1.48.335
12	19	(Finland) Mikko Lempinen	Audi A4 Quattro	1.48.870
13	12	(Italy) Sergio Sambataro	Audi A4 Quattro	1.49.259
14	15	(Italy) Paolo Zadra	BMW 320i	1.50.727
15	23	(Italy) Guido Lucchetti Cigarini	Audi A4 Quattro	1.51.062
16	14	(Germany) Heinrich Symanzick	Opel Vectra	1.52.876
17	3	(Italy) Romana Bernardoni	Alfa Romeo 156	1.55.675
18	11	(Italy) Gianluca Roda	Opel Vectra	1.56.092
19	20	(Italy) Gianluca De Lorenzi	BMW 320i	no time

Race 1

Pos	No	Driver	Constructor	Time/Retired	Points
1	4	(Italy) Gabriele Tarquini	Honda Accord	12 laps in 21:06.389	40
2	2	(Italy) Nicola Larini	Alfa Romeo 156	+2.134s	35
3	7	(Italy) Roberto Colciago	Audi A4 Quattro	+10.744s	32
4	1	(Italy) Fabrizio Giovanardi	Alfa Romeo 156	+18.375s	30
5	8	(Italy) Massimo Pigoli	Audi A4 Quattro	+27.485s	28
6	15	(France) Eric Cayrolle	BMW 320i	+34.929s	26
7	18	(Italy) Sandro Sardelli	Nissan Primera GT	+37.310s	24
8	10	(Italy) Enrico Toccacelo	Alfa Romeo 156	+43.947s	23
9	20	(Italy) Gianluca De Lorenzi	BMW 320i	+48.056s	22
10	15	(Italy) Paolo Zadra	BMW 320i	+1.23.788s	21
11	12	(Italy) Sergio Sambataro	Audi A4 Quattro	+1.33.412s	20
12	11	(Italy) Gianluca Roda	Opel Vectra	+1.42.796s	19
13 DNF	3	(Italy) Romana Bernardoni	Alfa Romeo 156	+2 laps	18
DNF	23	(Italy) Guido Lucchetti Cigarini	Audi A4 Quattro	+10 laps	
DNF	19	(Finland) Mikko Lempinen	Audi A4 Quattro	+11 laps	
DNF	5	(France) Fabrice Walfisch	Honda Accord	+11 laps	
DNF	29	(United Kingdom) Matt Neal	Nissan Primera GT	+10 laps	
DNF	9	(Italy) Angelo Lancelotti	Alfa Romeo 156	+12 laps	
DNS	14	(Germany) Heinrich Symanzick	Opel Vectra		

Grid 2

Pos	No	Driver	Car
1	11	(Italy) Gianluca Roda	Opel Vectra
2	12	(Italy) Sergio Sambataro	Audi A4 Quattro
3	15	(Italy) Paolo Zadra	BMW 320i
4	20	(Italy) Gianluca De Lorenzi	BMW 320i
5	10	(Italy) Enrico Toccacelo	Alfa Romeo 156
6	18	(Italy) Sandro Sardelli	Nissan Primera GT
7	15	(France) Eric Cayrolle	BMW 320i
8	8	(Italy) Massimo Pigoli	Audi A4 Quattro
9	1	(Italy) Fabrizio Giovanardi	Alfa Romeo 156
10	7	(Italy) Roberto Colciago	Audi A4 Quattro
11	2	(Italy) Nicola Larini	Alfa Romeo 156
12	4	(Italy) Gabriele Tarquini	Honda Accord
13	23	(Italy) Guido Lucchetti Cigarini	Audi A4 Quattro
PIT LANE	19	(Finland) Mikko Lempinen*	Audi A4 Quattro
PIT LANE	5	(France) Fabrice Walfisch*	Honda Accord
PIT LANE	29	(United Kingdom) Matt Neal*	Nissan Primera GT
PIT LANE	9	(Italy) Angelo Lancelotti*	Alfa Romeo 156
DNS	14	(Germany) Heinrich Symanzick	Opel Vectra
DNS	3	(Italy) Romana Bernardoni	Alfa Romeo 156

- Starting from the pit lane, for neutralization of parc-fermé

Race 2

Pos	No	Driver	Constructor	Time/Retired	Points
1	7	(Italy) Roberto Colciago	Audi A4 Quattro	12 laps in 21:13.718	40
2	2	(Italy) Nicola Larini	Alfa Romeo 156	+4.785s	35
3	20	(Italy) Gianluca De Lorenzi	BMW 320i	+11.423s	32
4	29	(United Kingdom) Matt Neal	Nissan Primera GT	+14.436s	30
5	8	(Italy) Massimo Pigoli	Audi A4 Quattro	+28.113s	28
6	5	(France) Fabrice Walfisch	Honda Accord	+38.608s	26
7	10	(Italy) Enrico Toccacelo	Alfa Romeo 156	+50.137s	24
8	9	(Italy) Angelo Lancelotti	Alfa Romeo 156	+55.768s	23
9	11	(Italy) Gianluca Roda	Opel Vectra	+59.064s	22
10	15	(Italy) Paolo Zadra	BMW 320i	+1.14.964s	21
11 DNF	19	(Finland) Mikko Lempinen	Audi A4 Quattro	+3 laps	20
DNF	18	(Italy) Sandro Sardelli	Nissan Primera GT	+4 laps	
DNF	15	(France) Eric Cayrolle	BMW 320i	+6 laps	
DNF	12	(Italy) Sergio Sambataro	Audi A4 Quattro	+11 laps	
DNF	1	(Italy) Fabrizio Giovanardi	Alfa Romeo 156	+11 laps	
DNF	4	(Italy) Gabriele Tarquini	Honda Accord	+12 laps	
DNF	23	(Italy) Guido Lucchetti Cigarini	Audi A4 Quattro	+12 laps	
DNS	14	(Germany) Heinrich Symanzick	Opel Vectra		
DNS	3	(Italy) Romana Bernardoni	Alfa Romeo 156		

=== Championship standings after Round 3 ===
Drivers' Championship standings

Pos	Driver	Points
1	(Italy) Nicola Larini	220
2	(Italy) Fabrizio Giovanardi	170
3	(Italy) Massimo Pigoli	158
3	(Italy) Roberto Colciago	158
5	(Italy) Enrico Toccacelo	124

Teams' Championship standings

Pos	Constructor	Points
1	(Italy) Nordauto Engineering	390
2	(Italy) AGS Motorsport	316
3	(Italy) JAS Engineering Italia IP	220
4	(Italy) Max Team	218
5	(Italy) Conrero	193

== Round 4 (United Kingdom) Silverstone Circuit ==
Qualifying Grid 1

Pos	No	Driver	Car	Lap Time
1	4	(Italy) Gabriele Tarquini	Honda Accord	1.54.384
2	1	(Italy) Fabrizio Giovanardi	Alfa Romeo 156	1.54.537
3	5	(France) Fabrice Walfisch	Honda Accord	1.55.146
4	29	(United Kingdom) Matt Neal	Nissan Primera GT	1.55.404
5	18	(Italy) Sandro Sardelli	Nissan Primera GT	1.56.773
6	9	(Italy) Angelo Lancelotti	Alfa Romeo 156	1.57.012
7	10	(Italy) Enrico Toccacelo	Alfa Romeo 156	1.57.279
8	20	(Italy) Gianluca De Lorenzi	BMW 320i	1.57.305
9	15	(France) Eric Cayrolle	BMW 320i	1.57.340
10	8	(Italy) Massimo Pigoli	Audi A4 Quattro	1.58.617
11	19	(Finland) Mikko Lempinen	Audi A4 Quattro	1.58.725
12	14	(Germany) Heinrich Symanzick	Opel Vectra	2.00.422
13	3	(Italy) Romana Bernardoni	Alfa Romeo 156	2.00.426
14	15	(Italy) Paolo Zadra	BMW 320i	2.00.722
15	12	(Italy) Sergio Sambataro	Audi A4 Quattro	2.00.915
16	2	(Italy) Nicola Larini	Alfa Romeo 156	no time
17	7	(Italy) Roberto Colciago	Audi A4 Quattro	1.55.852*
18	11	(Italy) Gianluca Roda	Opel Vectra	1.59.106*

- Colciago and Roda: times disallowed, for engine change

Race 1

Pos	No	Driver	Constructor	Time/Retired	Points
1	4	(Italy) Gabriele Tarquini	Honda Accord	10 laps in 19:23.198	40
2	1	(Italy) Fabrizio Giovanardi	Alfa Romeo 156	+2.972s	35
3	29	(United Kingdom) Matt Neal	Nissan Primera GT	+4.292s	32
4	5	(France) Fabrice Walfisch	Honda Accord	+10.756s	30
5	2	(Italy) Nicola Larini	Alfa Romeo 156	+15.475s	28
6	18	(Italy) Sandro Sardelli	Nissan Primera GT	+25.179s	26
7	20	(Italy) Gianluca De Lorenzi	BMW 320i	+27.480s	24
8	10	(Italy) Enrico Toccacelo	Alfa Romeo 156	+33.132s	23
9	19	(Finland) Mikko Lempinen	Audi A4 Quattro	+38.433s	22
10	8	(Italy) Massimo Pigoli	Audi A4 Quattro	+40.577s	21
11	15	(France) Eric Cayrolle	BMW 320i	+40.914s	20
12	9	(Italy) Angelo Lancelotti	Alfa Romeo 156	+41.623s	19
13	15	(Italy) Paolo Zadra	BMW 320i	+1.15.658s	18
14	12	(Italy) Sergio Sambataro	Audi A4 Quattro	+1.20.233s	17
15	3	(Italy) Romana Bernardoni	Alfa Romeo 156	+1.22.717s	16
DNS	7	(Italy) Roberto Colciago	Audi A4 Quattro		
DNS	11	(Italy) Gianluca Roda	Opel Vectra		
DNS	14	(Germany) Heinrich Symanzick	Opel Vectra		

Grid 2

Pos	No	Driver	Car
1	3	(Italy) Romana Bernardoni	Alfa Romeo 156
2	12	(Italy) Sergio Sambataro	Audi A4 Quattro
3	15	(Italy) Paolo Zadra	BMW 320i
4	9	(Italy) Angelo Lancelotti	Alfa Romeo 156
5	15	(France) Eric Cayrolle	BMW 320i
6	19	(Finland) Mikko Lempinen	Audi A4 Quattro
7	10	(Italy) Enrico Toccacelo	Alfa Romeo 156
8	20	(Italy) Gianluca De Lorenzi	BMW 320i
9	18	(Italy) Sandro Sardelli	Nissan Primera GT
10	2	(Italy) Nicola Larini	Alfa Romeo 156
11	5	(France) Fabrice Walfisch	Honda Accord
12	29	(United Kingdom) Matt Neal	Nissan Primera GT
13	1	(Italy) Fabrizio Giovanardi	Alfa Romeo 156
14	4	(Italy) Gabriele Tarquini	Honda Accord
PIT LANE	7	(Italy) Roberto Colciago*	Audi A4 Quattro
PIT LANE	8	(Italy) Massimo Pigoli*	Audi A4 Quattro
PIT LANE	11	(Italy) Gianluca Roda*	Opel Vectra
PIT LANE	14	(Germany) Heinrich Symanzick*	Opel Vectra

- Starting from the pit lane, for neutralization of parc-fermé

Race 2

Pos	No	Driver	Constructor	Time/Retired	Points
1	4	(Italy) Gabriele Tarquini	Honda Accord	10 laps in 19:41.057	40
2	1	(Italy) Fabrizio Giovanardi	Alfa Romeo 156	+1.904s	35
3	2	(Italy) Nicola Larini	Alfa Romeo 156	+5.681s	32
4	29	(United Kingdom) Matt Neal	Nissan Primera GT	+6.516s	30
5	5	(France) Fabrice Walfisch	Honda Accord	+12.003s	28
6	18	(Italy) Sandro Sardelli	Nissan Primera GT	+18.444s	26
7	15	(France) Eric Cayrolle	BMW 320i	+21.292s	24
8	20	(Italy) Gianluca De Lorenzi	BMW 320i	+21.538s	23
9	9	(Italy) Angelo Lancelotti	Alfa Romeo 156	+22.169s	22
10	10	(Italy) Enrico Toccacelo	Alfa Romeo 156	+30.802s	21
11	19	(Finland) Mikko Lempinen	Audi A4 Quattro	+31.068s	20
12	8	(Italy) Massimo Pigoli	Audi A4 Quattro	+31.366s	19
13	11	(Italy) Gianluca Roda	Opel Vectra	+50.003s	18
14	14	(Germany) Heinrich Symanzick	Opel Vectra	+1.01.947s	17
15	15	(Italy) Paolo Zadra	BMW 320i	+1.10.629s	16
16	3	(Italy) Romana Bernardoni	Alfa Romeo 156	+1.18.432s	15
17	12	(Italy) Sergio Sambataro	Audi A4 Quattro	+1.47.878s	14
DNF	7	(Italy) Roberto Colciago	Audi A4 Quattro	+8 laps	

=== Championship standings after Round 4 ===
Drivers' Championship standings

Pos	Driver	Points
1	(Italy) Nicola Larini	280
2	(Italy) Fabrizio Giovanardi	240
3	(Italy) Massimo Pigoli	198
4	(Italy) Gabriele Tarquini	192
5	(Italy) Enrico Toccacelo	168

Teams' Championship standings

Pos	Constructor	Points
1	(Italy) Nordauto Engineering	520
2	(Italy) JAS Engineering Italia IP	358
3	(Italy) AGS Motorsport	356
4	(Italy) Max Team	296
5	(Italy) Conrero	278

== Round 5 (Belgium) Circuit Zolder ==
Qualifying Grid 1

Pos	No	Driver	Car	Lap Time
1	4	(Italy) Gabriele Tarquini	Honda Accord	1.35.337
2	2	(Italy) Nicola Larini	Alfa Romeo 156	1.35.419
3	1	(Italy) Fabrizio Giovanardi	Alfa Romeo 156	1.35.532
4	7	(Italy) Roberto Colciago	Audi A4 Quattro	1.35.640
5	29	(United Kingdom) Matt Neal	Nissan Primera GT	1.36.766
6	20	(Italy) Gianluca De Lorenzi	BMW 320i	1.36.895
7	5	(France) Fabrice Walfisch	Honda Accord	1.37.302
8	9	(Italy) Angelo Lancelotti	Alfa Romeo 156	1.37.447
9	8	(Italy) Massimo Pigoli	Audi A4 Quattro	1.37.528
10	15	(France) Eric Cayrolle	BMW 320i	1.37.679
11	11	(Italy) Gianluca Roda	Opel Vectra	1.38.271
12	19	(Finland) Mikko Lempinen	Audi A4 Quattro	1.38.398
13	3	(Italy) Romana Bernardoni	Alfa Romeo 156	1.39.107
14	15	(Italy) Paolo Zadra	BMW 320i	1.39.923
15	14	(Germany) Heinrich Symanzick	Opel Vectra	1.39.989
16	18	(Italy) Sandro Sardelli	Nissan Primera GT	1.40.266
17	10	(Italy) Enrico Toccacelo	Alfa Romeo 156	1.38.395*

- Toccacelo: times disallowed for engine change

Race 1

Pos	No	Driver	Constructor	Time/Retired	Points
1	4	(Italy) Gabriele Tarquini	Honda Accord	13 laps in 21:00.387	40
2	7	(Italy) Roberto Colciago	Audi A4 Quattro	+2.992s	35
3	5	(France) Fabrice Walfisch	Honda Accord	+12.298s	30
4	1	(Italy) Fabrizio Giovanardi	Alfa Romeo 156	+15.640s	28
5	20	(Italy) Gianluca De Lorenzi	BMW 320i	+23.552s	26
6	9	(Italy) Angelo Lancelotti	Alfa Romeo 156	+36.535s	24
7	11	(Italy) Gianluca Roda	Opel Vectra	+43.830s	23
8	3	(Italy) Romana Bernardoni	Alfa Romeo 156	+48.532s	22
9	15	(Italy) Paolo Zadra	BMW 320i	+50.355s	21
10	18	(Italy) Sandro Sardelli	Nissan Primera GT	+1 lap	20
11 DNF	15	(France) Eric Cayrolle	BMW 320i	+2 laps	19
12 DNF	14	(Germany) Heinrich Symanzick	Opel Vectra	+2 laps	18
13 DNF	19	(Finland) Mikko Lempinen	Audi A4 Quattro	+4 laps	17
DSQ	29	(United Kingdom) Matt Neal	Nissan Primera GT	+5 laps	
DNF	8	(Italy) Massimo Pigoli	Audi A4 Quattro	+7 laps	
DNF	2	(Italy) Nicola Larini	Alfa Romeo 156	+10 laps	
DNF	10	(Italy) Enrico Toccacelo	Alfa Romeo 156	+12 laps	

- Neal: black flagged, for collision with Giovanardi

Grid 2

Pos	No	Driver	Car
1	18	(Italy) Sandro Sardelli	Nissan Primera GT
2	15	(Italy) Paolo Zadra	BMW 320i
3	3	(Italy) Romana Bernardoni	Alfa Romeo 156
4	11	(Italy) Gianluca Roda	Opel Vectra
5	9	(Italy) Angelo Lancelotti	Alfa Romeo 156
6	20	(Italy) Gianluca De Lorenzi	BMW 320i
7	1	(Italy) Fabrizio Giovanardi	Alfa Romeo 156
8	5	(France) Fabrice Walfisch	Honda Accord
9	7	(Italy) Roberto Colciago	Audi A4 Quattro
10	29	(United Kingdom) Matt Neal	Nissan Primera GT
11	2	(Italy) Nicola Larini	Alfa Romeo 156
PIT LANE	19	(Finland) Mikko Lempinen	Audi A4 Quattro
PIT LANE	14	(Germany) Heinrich Symanzick	Opel Vectra
PIT LANE	15	(France) Eric Cayrolle	BMW 320i
PIT LANE	4	(Italy) Gabriele Tarquini	Honda Accord
PIT LANE	10	(Italy) Enrico Toccacelo	Alfa Romeo 156
PIT LANE	8	(Italy) Massimo Pigoli	Audi A4 Quattro

Race 2

Pos	No	Driver	Constructor	Time/Retired	Points
1	1	(Italy) Fabrizio Giovanardi	Alfa Romeo 156	13	40
2	29	(United Kingdom) Matt Neal	Nissan Primera GT	+4.502s	35
3	2	(Italy) Nicola Larini	Alfa Romeo 156	+5.499s	32
4	18	(Italy) Sandro Sardelli	Nissan Primera GT	+7.015s	30
5	5	(France) Fabrice Walfisch	Honda Accord	+8.356s	28
6	20	(Italy) Gianluca De Lorenzi	BMW 320i	+8.866s	26
7	9	(Italy) Angelo Lancelotti	Alfa Romeo 156	+21.491s	24
8	11	(Italy) Gianluca Roda	Opel Vectra	+29.377s	23
9	15	(Italy) Paolo Zadra	BMW 320i	+35.944s	22
10	15	(France) Eric Cayrolle	BMW 320i	+38.005s	21
11	3	(Italy) Romana Bernardoni	Alfa Romeo 156	+42.887s	20
12	10	(Italy) Enrico Toccacelo	Alfa Romeo 156	+50.617s	19
13	14	(Germany) Heinrich Symanzick	Opel Vectra	+59.808s	18
14	4	(Italy) Gabriele Tarquini	Honda Accord	+1 lap	17
15 DNF	19	(Finland) Mikko Lempinen	Audi A4 Quattro	+2 laps	16
DNF	7	(Italy) Roberto Colciago	Audi A4 Quattro	+8 laps	
DNS	8	(Italy) Massimo Pigoli	Audi A4 Quattro		

=== Championship standings after Round 5 ===
Drivers' Championship standings

Pos	Driver	Points
1	(Italy) Nicola Larini	312
2	(Italy) Fabrizio Giovanardi	310
3	(Italy) Gabriele Tarquini	249
4	(France) Fabrice Walfisch	226
5	(Italy) Sandro Sardelli	213

Teams' Championship standings

Pos	Constructor	Points
1	(Italy) Nordauto Engineering	645
2	(Italy) JAS Engineering Italia IP	475
3	(Italy) AGS Motorsport	391
4	(Italy) Max Team	381
5	(Italy) Conrero	347

== Round 6 (Hungary) Hungaroring ==
Qualifying Grid 1

Pos	No	Driver	Car	Lap Time
1	1	(Italy) Fabrizio Giovanardi	Alfa Romeo 156	1.42.569
2	4	(Italy) Gabriele Tarquini	Honda Accord	1.42.589
3	2	(Italy) Nicola Larini	Alfa Romeo 156	1.42.794
4	7	(Italy) Roberto Colciago	Audi A4 Quattro	1.43.003
5	29	(United Kingdom) Matt Neal	Nissan Primera GT	1.43.474
6	5	(France) Fabrice Walfisch	Honda Accord	1.43.539
7	9	(Italy) Angelo Lancelotti	Alfa Romeo 156	1.43.725
8	18	(Italy) Sandro Sardelli	Nissan Primera GT	1.44.433
9	15	(France) Eric Cayrolle	BMW 320i	1.45.070
10	10	(Italy) Enrico Toccacelo	Alfa Romeo 156	1.45.202
11	8	(Italy) Massimo Pigoli	Audi A4 Quattro	1.45.240
12	19	(Finland) Mikko Lempinen	Audi A4 Quattro	1.45.682
13	15	(Italy) Paolo Zadra	BMW 320i	1.46.328
14	11	(Italy) Gianluca Roda	Opel Vectra	1.46.579
15	3	(Italy) Romana Bernardoni	Alfa Romeo 156	1.47.005
16	21	(Italy) Moreno Soli	BMW 320i	1.47.354
17	14	(Germany) Heinrich Symanzick	Opel Vectra	1.50.752

Race 1

Pos	No	Driver	Constructor	Time/Retired	Points
1	1	(Italy) Fabrizio Giovanardi	Alfa Romeo 156	13 laps in 22:39.083	40
2	4	(Italy) Gabriele Tarquini	Honda Accord	+0.209s	35
3	7	(Italy) Roberto Colciago	Audi A4 Quattro	+0.526s	32
4	5	(France) Fabrice Walfisch	Honda Accord	+16.378s	30
5	15	(France) Eric Cayrolle	BMW 320i	+17.205s	28
6	18	(Italy) Sandro Sardelli	Nissan Primera GT	+17.613s	26
7	9	(Italy) Angelo Lancelotti	Alfa Romeo 156	+24.715s	24
8	19	(Finland) Mikko Lempinen	Audi A4 Quattro	+30.924s	23
9	10	(Italy) Enrico Toccacelo	Alfa Romeo 156	+33.131s	22
10	3	(Italy) Romana Bernardoni	Alfa Romeo 156	+48.375s	21
11	21	(Italy) Moreno Soli	BMW 320i	+1.00.043s	20
12	2	(Italy) Nicola Larini	Alfa Romeo 156	+1.48.116s	19
13 DNF	15	(Italy) Paolo Zadra	BMW 320i	+2 laps	18
14 DNF	29	(United Kingdom) Matt Neal	Nissan Primera GT	+4 laps	17
15 DNF	14	(Germany) Heinrich Symanzick	Opel Vectra	+4 laps	16
DNF	8	(Italy) Massimo Pigoli	Audi A4 Quattro	+10 laps	
DNF	11	(Italy) Gianluca Roda	Opel Vectra	+13 laps	

Grid 2

Pos	No	Driver	Car
1	2	(Italy) Nicola Larini	Alfa Romeo 156
2	21	(Italy) Moreno Soli	BMW 320i
3	3	(Italy) Romana Bernardoni	Alfa Romeo 156
4	10	(Italy) Enrico Toccacelo	Alfa Romeo 156
5	19	(Finland) Mikko Lempinen	Audi A4 Quattro
6	9	(Italy) Angelo Lancelotti	Alfa Romeo 156
7	18	(Italy) Sandro Sardelli	Nissan Primera GT
8	15	(France) Eric Cayrolle	BMW 320i
9	5	(France) Fabrice Walfisch	Honda Accord
10	7	(Italy) Roberto Colciago	Audi A4 Quattro
11	4	(Italy) Gabriele Tarquini	Honda Accord
12	1	(Italy) Fabrizio Giovanardi	Alfa Romeo 156
PIT LANE	14	(Germany) Heinrich Symanzick	Opel Vectra
PIT LANE	15	(Italy) Paolo Zadra	BMW 320i
PIT LANE	8	(Italy) Massimo Pigoli	Audi A4 Quattro
DNS	29	(United Kingdom) Matt Neal	Nissan Primera GT
DNS	11	(Italy) Gianluca Roda	Opel Vectra

Race 2

Pos	No	Driver	Constructor	Time/Retired	Points
1	7	(Italy) Roberto Colciago	Audi A4 Quattro	13 laps in 22:44.381	40
2	2	(Italy) Nicola Larini	Alfa Romeo 156	+2.911s	35
3	1	(Italy) Fabrizio Giovanardi	Alfa Romeo 156	+8.157s	32
4	4	(Italy) Gabriele Tarquini	Honda Accord	+8.676s	30
5	5	(France) Fabrice Walfisch	Honda Accord	+16.268s	28
6	18	(Italy) Sandro Sardelli	Nissan Primera GT	+25.008s	26
7	19	(Finland) Mikko Lempinen	Audi A4 Quattro	+33.113s	24
8	10	(Italy) Enrico Toccacelo	Alfa Romeo 156	+49.960s	23
9	15	(Italy) Paolo Zadra	BMW 320i	+59.632s	22
10	21	(Italy) Moreno Soli	BMW 320i	+1.04.888s	21
11	3	(Italy) Romana Bernardoni	Alfa Romeo 156	+1.37.293s	20
DNF	8	(Italy) Massimo Pigoli	Audi A4 Quattro	+7 laps	
DNF	9	(Italy) Angelo Lancelotti	Alfa Romeo 156	+8 laps	
DNF	15	(France) Eric Cayrolle	BMW 320i	+13 laps	
DNF	14	(Germany) Heinrich Symanzick	Opel Vectra		
DNS	29	(United Kingdom) Matt Neal	Nissan Primera GT		
DNS	11	(Italy) Gianluca Roda	Opel Vectra		

=== Championship standings after Round 6 ===
Drivers' Championship standings

Pos	Driver	Points
1	(Italy) Fabrizio Giovanardi	382
2	(Italy) Nicola Larini	366
3	(Italy) Gabriele Tarquini	314
4	(France) Fabrice Walfisch	284
5	(Italy) Sandro Sardelli	265

Teams' Championship standings

Pos	Constructor	Points
1	(Italy) Nordauto Engineering	773
2	(Italy) JAS Engineering Italia IP	598
3	(Italy) AGS Motorsport	463
4	(Italy) Max Team	449
5	(Italy) Conrero	416

== Round 7 (Austria) A1-Ring ==
Qualifying Grid 1

Pos	No	Driver	Car	Lap Time
1	4	(Italy) Gabriele Tarquini	Honda Accord	1.36.575
2	1	(Italy) Fabrizio Giovanardi	Alfa Romeo 156	1.36.742
3	2	(Italy) Nicola Larini	Alfa Romeo 156	1.36.984
4	7	(Italy) Roberto Colciago	Audi A4 Quattro	1.37.660
5	5	(France) Fabrice Walfisch	Honda Accord	1.37.907
6	20	(Italy) Gianluca De Lorenzi	BMW 320i	1.38.519
7	3	(Italy) Romana Bernardoni	Alfa Romeo 156	1.39.195
8	9	(Italy) Angelo Lancelotti	Alfa Romeo 156	1.39.319
9	8	(Italy) Massimo Pigoli	Audi A4 Quattro	1.39.527
10	15	(Italy) Paolo Zadra	BMW 320i	1.39.611
11	16	(France) Eric Cayrolle	BMW 320i	1.39.856
12	30	(San Marino) Stefano Valli	BMW 320i	1.40.295
13	14	(Germany) Heinrich Symanzick	Opel Vectra	1.40.342
14	19	(Finland) Mikko Lempinen	Audi A4 Quattro	1.40.397
15	21	(Italy) Moreno Soli	BMW 320i	1.40.585
16	12	(Italy) Sergio Sambataro	Audi A4 Quattro	1.40.819
17	10	(Italy) Salvatore Deplano	Alfa Romeo 156	1.46.314
18	18	(Italy) Sandro Sardelli	Nissan Primera GT	1.39.174 *

- Sardelli: times disallowed for engine change

Race 1

Pos	No	Driver	Constructor	Time/Retired	Points
1	4	(Italy) Gabriele Tarquini	Honda Accord	12 laps in 19:32.658	40
2	1	(Italy) Fabrizio Giovanardi	Alfa Romeo 156	+1.121s	35
3	5	(France) Fabrice Walfisch	Honda Accord	+7.683s	32
4	7	(Italy) Roberto Colciago	Audi A4 Quattro	+11.300s	30
5	20	(Italy) Gianluca De Lorenzi	BMW 320i	+20.247s	28
6	18	(Italy) Sandro Sardelli	Nissan Primera GT	+20.907s	26
7	9	(Italy) Angelo Lancelotti	Alfa Romeo 156	+31.647s	24
8	3	(Italy) Romana Bernardoni	Alfa Romeo 156	+34.849s	23
9	15	(Italy) Paolo Zadra	BMW 320i	+43.578s	22
10	16	(France) Eric Cayrolle	BMW 320i	+45.801s	21
11	8	(Italy) Massimo Pigoli	Audi A4 Quattro	+46.065s	20
12	14	(Germany) Heinrich Symanzick	Opel Vectra	+53.746s	19
13	30	(San Marino) Stefano Valli	BMW 320i	+54.627s	18
14	2	(Italy) Nicola Larini	Alfa Romeo 156	+1.07.427s	17
15	19	(Finland) Mikko Lempinen	Audi A4 Quattro	+1.33.174s	16
DNF	21	(Italy) Moreno Soli	BMW 320i	+8 laps	
DNF	12	(Italy) Sergio Sambataro	Audi A4 Quattro	+11 laps	
DNS	10	(Italy) Salvatore Deplano	Alfa Romeo 156		

Grid 2

Pos	No	Driver	Car
1	19	(Finland) Mikko Lempinen	Audi A4 Quattro
2	2	(Italy) Nicola Larini	Alfa Romeo 156
3	30	(San Marino) Stefano Valli	BMW 320i
4	14	(Germany) Heinrich Symanzick	Opel Vectra
5	8	(Italy) Massimo Pigoli	Audi A4 Quattro
6	15	(France) Eric Cayrolle	BMW 320i
7	15	(Italy) Paolo Zadra	BMW 320i
8	3	(Italy) Romana Bernardoni	Alfa Romeo 156
9	9	(Italy) Angelo Lancelotti	Alfa Romeo 156
10	18	(Italy) Sandro Sardelli	Nissan Primera GT
11	20	(Italy) Gianluca De Lorenzi	BMW 320i
12	7	(Italy) Roberto Colciago	Audi A4 Quattro
13	5	(France) Fabrice Walfisch	Honda Accord
14	1	(Italy) Fabrizio Giovanardi	Alfa Romeo 156
15	4	(Italy) Gabriele Tarquini	Honda Accord
PIT LANE	21	(Italy) Moreno Soli	BMW 320i
PIT LANE	12	(Italy) Sergio Sambataro	Audi A4 Quattro
DNS	10	(Italy) Salvatore Deplano	Alfa Romeo 156

Race 2

Pos	No	Driver	Constructor	Time/Retired	Points
1	4	(Italy) Gabriele Tarquini	Honda Accord	12 laps in 19:49.779	40
2	2	(Italy) Nicola Larini	Alfa Romeo 156	+2.269s	35
3	1	(Italy) Fabrizio Giovanardi	Alfa Romeo 156	+4.338s	32
4	5	(France) Fabrice Walfisch	Honda Accord	+13.187s	30
5	20	(Italy) Gianluca De Lorenzi	BMW 320i	+20.863s	28
6	15	(Italy) Paolo Zadra	BMW 320i	+36.508s	26
7	30	(San Marino) Stefano Valli	BMW 320i	+38.508s	24
8	19	(Finland) Mikko Lempinen	Audi A4 Quattro	+41.083s	23
9	14	(Germany) Heinrich Symanzick	Opel Vectra	+47.542s	22
10	9	(Italy) Angelo Lancelotti	Alfa Romeo 156	+49.561s	21
11	21	(Italy) Moreno Soli	BMW 320i	+59.686s	20
12	15	(France) Eric Cayrolle	BMW 320i	+1.06.415s	19
13	3	(Italy) Romana Bernardoni	Alfa Romeo 156	+1.09.093s	18
14	18	(Italy) Sandro Sardelli	Nissan Primera GT	+1 lap	17
DNF	12	(Italy) Sergio Sambataro	Audi A4 Quattro	+5 laps	
DNF	8	(Italy) Massimo Pigoli	Audi A4 Quattro	+10 laps	
DNF	7	(Italy) Roberto Colciago	Audi A4 Quattro	+10 laps	
DNS	10	(Italy) Salvatore Deplano	Alfa Romeo 156		

=== Championship standings after Round 7 ===
Drivers' Championship standings

Pos	Driver	Points
1	(Italy) Fabrizio Giovanardi	449
2	(Italy) Nicola Larini	418
3	(Italy) Gabriele Tarquini	394
4	(France) Fabrice Walfisch	346
5	(Italy) Sandro Sardelli	308

Teams' Championship standings

Pos	Constructor	Points
1	(Italy) Nordauto Engineering	898
2	(Italy) JAS Engineering Italia IP	740
3	(Italy) Max Team	537
4	(Italy) AGS Motorsport	513
5	(Italy) Conrero	481

== Round 8 (Germany) Nürburgring ==
Qualifying Grid 1

Pos	No	Driver	Car	Lap Time
1	4	(Italy) Gabriele Tarquini	Honda Accord	1.44.692
2	2	(Italy) Nicola Larini	Alfa Romeo 156	1.45.140
3	29	(United Kingdom) Matt Neal	Nissan Primera GT	1.45.476
4	5	(France) Fabrice Walfisch	Honda Accord	1.45.820
5	1	(Italy) Fabrizio Giovanardi	Alfa Romeo 156	1.46.120
6	7	(Italy) Roberto Colciago	Audi A4 Quattro	1.46.367
7	18	(Italy) Sandro Sardelli	Nissan Primera GT	1.46.753
8	20	(Italy) Gianluca De Lorenzi	BMW 320i	1.47.506
9	15	(France) Eric Cayrolle	BMW 320i	1.47.771
10	19	(Finland) Mikko Lempinen	Audi A4 Quattro	1.48.839
11	15	(Italy) Paolo Zadra	BMW 320i	1.49.172
12	8	(Italy) Massimo Pigoli	Audi A4 Quattro	1.49.992
13	10	(Italy) Giovanni Gulinelli	Alfa Romeo 156	1.50.285
14	21	(Italy) Moreno Soli	BMW 320i	1.50.428
15	3	(Italy) Romana Bernardoni	Alfa Romeo 156	1.50.857
16	14	(Germany) Heinrich Symanzick	Opel Vectra	1.51.023
17	9	(Italy) Angelo Lancelotti	Alfa Romeo 156	2.01.395
18	11	(Italy) Gianluca Roda	Opel Vectra	no time

Race 1

Pos	No	Driver	Constructor	Time/Retired	Points
1	2	(Italy) Nicola Larini	Alfa Romeo 156	11 laps in 21:56.814	40
2	4	(Italy) Gabriele Tarquini	Honda Accord	+1.583s	35
3	29	(United Kingdom) Matt Neal	Nissan Primera GT	+8.246s	32
4	18	(Italy) Sandro Sardelli	Nissan Primera GT	+31.308s	30
5	20	(Italy) Gianluca De Lorenzi	BMW 320i	+36.154s	28
6	19	(Finland) Mikko Lempinen	Audi A4 Quattro	+40.936s	26
7	9	(Italy) Angelo Lancelotti	Alfa Romeo 156	+41.187s	24
8	8	(Italy) Massimo Pigoli	Audi A4 Quattro	+45.555s	23
9	11	(Italy) Gianluca Roda	Opel Vectra	+1.12.747s	22
10	3	(Italy) Romana Bernardoni	Alfa Romeo 156	+1.15.312s	21
11	14	(Germany) Heinrich Symanzick	Opel Vectra	+1.19.892s	20
12	15	(France) Eric Cayrolle	BMW 320i	+1.23.581s	19
13	21	(Italy) Moreno Soli	BMW 320i	+1.30.682s	18
14	15	(Italy) Paolo Zadra	BMW 320i	+1.33.372s	17
15	5	(France) Fabrice Walfisch	Honda Accord	+1.39.466s	16
16	7	(Italy) Roberto Colciago	Audi A4 Quattro	+1 lap	15
17	1	(Italy) Fabrizio Giovanardi	Alfa Romeo 156	+3 laps	14
DNF	10	(Italy) Giovanni Gulinelli	Alfa Romeo 156	+4 laps	

Grid 2

Pos	No	Driver	Car
1	1	(Italy) Fabrizio Giovanardi	Alfa Romeo 156
2	7	(Italy) Roberto Colciago	Audi A4 Quattro
3	5	(France) Fabrice Walfisch	Honda Accord
4	15	(Italy) Paolo Zadra	BMW 320i
5	21	(Italy) Moreno Soli	BMW 320i
6	14	(Germany) Heinrich Symanzick	Opel Vectra
7	3	(Italy) Romana Bernardoni	Alfa Romeo 156
8	11	(Italy) Gianluca Roda	Opel Vectra
9	8	(Italy) Massimo Pigoli	Audi A4 Quattro
10	9	(Italy) Angelo Lancelotti	Alfa Romeo 156
11	19	(Finland) Mikko Lempinen	Audi A4 Quattro
12	20	(Italy) Gianluca De Lorenzi	BMW 320i
13	18	(Italy) Sandro Sardelli	Nissan Primera GT
14	29	(United Kingdom) Matt Neal	Nissan Primera GT
15	4	(Italy) Gabriele Tarquini	Honda Accord
16	2	(Italy) Nicola Larini	Alfa Romeo 156
17	10	(Italy) Giovanni Gulinelli	Alfa Romeo 156
PIT LANE	15	(France) Eric Cayrolle	BMW 320i

Race 2

Pos	No	Driver	Constructor	Time/Retired	Points
1	5	(France) Fabrice Walfisch	Honda Accord	11 laps in 19:42.435	40
2	4	(Italy) Gabriele Tarquini	Honda Accord	+2.124s	35
3	7	(Italy) Roberto Colciago	Audi A4 Quattro	+2.616s	32
4	1	(Italy) Fabrizio Giovanardi	Alfa Romeo 156	+10.408s	30
5	2	(Italy) Nicola Larini	Alfa Romeo 156	+15.444s	28
6	20	(Italy) Gianluca De Lorenzi	BMW 320i	+17.021s	26
7	18	(Italy) Sandro Sardelli	Nissan Primera GT	+17.379s	24
8	9	(Italy) Angelo Lancelotti	Alfa Romeo 156	+26.023s	23
9	15	(France) Eric Cayrolle	BMW 320i	+29.844s	22
10	19	(Finland) Mikko Lempinen	Audi A4 Quattro	+41.674s	21
11	8	(Italy) Massimo Pigoli	Audi A4 Quattro	+42.730s	20
12	14	(Germany) Heinrich Symanzick	Opel Vectra	+47.130s	19
13	21	(Italy) Moreno Soli	BMW 320i	+51.373s	18
14	11	(Italy) Gianluca Roda	Opel Vectra	+1.03.711s	17
15	10	(Italy) Giovanni Gulinelli	Alfa Romeo 156	+1.08.310s	16
16	15	(Italy) Paolo Zadra	BMW 320i	+1.22.807s	15
17	3	(Italy) Romana Bernardoni	Alfa Romeo 156	+1 lap	14
18 DNF	29	(United Kingdom) Matt Neal	Nissan Primera GT	+2 laps	13

=== Championship standings after Round 8 ===
Drivers' Championship standings

Pos	Driver	Points
1	(Italy) Fabrizio Giovanardi	493
2	(Italy) Nicola Larini	486
3	(Italy) Gabriele Tarquini	464
4	(France) Fabrice Walfisch	402
5	(Italy) Sandro Sardelli	362

Teams' Championship standings

Pos	Constructor	Points
1	(Italy) Nordauto Engineering	1017
2	(Italy) JAS Engineering Italia IP	866
3	(Italy) Max Team	610
4	(Italy) AGS Motorsport	603
5	(Italy) Conrero	524

== Round 9 (Spain) Circuito del Jarama ==
Qualifying Grid 1

Pos	No	Driver	Car	Lap Time
1	4	(Italy) Gabriele Tarquini	Honda Accord	1.36.329
2	6	(United Kingdom) James Thompson	Honda Accord	1.36.425
3	5	(France) Fabrice Walfisch	Honda Accord	1.36.451
4	26	(Sweden) Carl Rosenblad	Nissan Primera GT	1.36.576
5	31	(Brazil) Felipe Massa	Alfa Romeo 156	1.36.691
6	1	(Italy) Fabrizio Giovanardi	Alfa Romeo 156	1.36.729
7	7	(Italy) Roberto Colciago	Audi A4 Quattro	1.36.858
8	29	(United Kingdom) Matt Neal	Nissan Primera GT	1.37.143
9	2	(Italy) Nicola Larini	Alfa Romeo 156	1.37.148
10	20	(Italy) Gianluca De Lorenzi	BMW 320i	1.37.772
11	9	(Italy) Angelo Lancelotti	Alfa Romeo 156	1.37.899
12	27	(Sweden) Marcus Gustafsson	Nissan Primera GT	1.38.121
13	18	(Italy) Sandro Sardelli	Nissan Primera GT	1.38.228
14	8	(Italy) Massimo Pigoli	Audi A4 Quattro	1.38.560
15	15	(France) Eric Cayrolle	BMW 320i	1.39.179
16	10	(Italy) Giovanni Gulinelli	Alfa Romeo 156	1.39.729
17	19	(Finland) Mikko Lempinen	Audi A4 Quattro	1.39.876
18	21	(Italy) Moreno Soli	BMW 320i	1.39.977
19	15	(Italy) Paolo Zadra	BMW 320i	1.40.328
20	3	(Italy) Romana Bernardoni	Alfa Romeo 156	1.40.970
21	14	(Germany) Heinrich Symanzick	Opel Vectra	1.41.729
22	12	(Italy) Sergio Sambataro	Audi A4 Quattro	no time

Race 1

Pos	No	Driver	Constructor	Time/Retired	Points
1	4	(Italy) Gabriele Tarquini	Honda Accord	13 laps in 22:56.548	40
2	6	(United Kingdom) James Thompson	Honda Accord	+0.912s	35
3	1	(Italy) Fabrizio Giovanardi	Alfa Romeo 156	+2.468s	32
4	2	(Italy) Nicola Larini	Alfa Romeo 156	+3.267s	30
5	29	(United Kingdom) Matt Neal	Nissan Primera GT	+11.983s	28
6	20	(Italy) Gianluca De Lorenzi	BMW 320i	+13.361s	26
7	18	(Italy) Sandro Sardelli	Nissan Primera GT	+14.427s	24
8	15	(France) Eric Cayrolle	BMW 320i	+24.869s	23
9	19	(Finland) Mikko Lempinen	Audi A4 Quattro	+34.639s	22
10	21	(Italy) Moreno Soli	BMW 320i	+36.812s	21
11	3	(Italy) Romana Bernardoni	Alfa Romeo 156	+39.515s	20
12	26	(Sweden) Carl Rosenblad	Nissan Primera GT	+39.770s	19
13	10	(Italy) Giovanni Gulinelli	Alfa Romeo 156	+1 lap	18
14	31	(Brazil) Felipe Massa	Alfa Romeo 156	+1 lap	17
15	15	(Italy) Paolo Zadra	BMW 320i	+ lap	16
16	8	(Italy) Massimo Pigoli	Audi A4 Quattro	+2 laps	15
DNF	27	(Sweden) Marcus Gustafsson	Nissan Primera GT	+6 laps	
DNF	9	(Italy) Angelo Lancelotti	Alfa Romeo 156	+7 laps	
DNF	7	(Italy) Roberto Colciago	Audi A4 Quattro	+7 laps	
DNF	5	(France) Fabrice Walfisch	Honda Accord	+11 laps	
DNF	12	(Italy) Sergio Sambataro	Audi A4 Quattro	+12 laps	
DNS	14	(Germany) Heinrich Symanzick	Opel Vectra		

Grid 2

Pos	No	Driver	Car
1	8	(Italy) Massimo Pigoli	Audi A4 Quattro
2	15	(Italy) Paolo Zadra	BMW 320i
3	31	(Brazil) Felipe Massa	Alfa Romeo 156
4	26	(Sweden) Carl Rosenblad	Nissan Primera GT
5	3	(Italy) Romana Bernardoni	Alfa Romeo 156
6	21	(Italy) Moreno Soli	BMW 320i
7	19	(Finland) Mikko Lempinen	Audi A4 Quattro
8	15	(France) Eric Cayrolle	BMW 320i
9	18	(Italy) Sandro Sardelli	Nissan Primera GT
10	20	(Italy) Gianluca De Lorenzi	BMW 320i
11	29	(United Kingdom) Matt Neal	Nissan Primera GT
12	2	(Italy) Nicola Larini	Alfa Romeo 156
13	1	(Italy) Fabrizio Giovanardi	Alfa Romeo 156
14	6	(United Kingdom) James Thompson	Honda Accord
15	4	(Italy) Gabriele Tarquini	Honda Accord
16	27	(Sweden) Marcus Gustafsson	Nissan Primera GT
17	5	(France) Fabrice Walfisch	Honda Accord
18	14	(Germany) Heinrich Symanzick	Opel Vectra
PIT LANE	10	(Italy) Giovanni Gulinelli	Alfa Romeo 156
PIT LANE	9	(Italy) Angelo Lancelotti	Alfa Romeo 156
PIT LANE	7	(Italy) Roberto Colciago	Audi A4 Quattro
DNS	12	(Italy) Sergio Sambataro	Audi A4 Quattro

Race 2

Pos	No	Driver	Constructor	Time/Retired	Points
1	4	(Italy) Gabriele Tarquini	Honda Accord	13 laps in 21:37.521	40
2	1	(Italy) Fabrizio Giovanardi	Alfa Romeo 156	+1.952s	35
3	20	(Italy) Gianluca De Lorenzi	BMW 320i	+2.222s	32
4	6	(United Kingdom) James Thompson	Honda Accord	+2.374s	30
5	2	(Italy) Nicola Larini	Alfa Romeo 156	+6.752s	28
6	31	(Brazil) Felipe Massa	Alfa Romeo 156	+7.590s	26
7	5	(France) Fabrice Walfisch	Honda Accord	+11.302s	24
8	7	(Italy) Roberto Colciago	Audi A4 Quattro	+15.322s	23
9	26	(Sweden) Carl Rosenblad	Nissan Primera GT	+25.956s	22
10	15	(Italy) Paolo Zadra	BMW 320i	+32.167s	21
11	15	(France) Eric Cayrolle	BMW 320i	+36.448s	20
12	19	(Finland) Mikko Lempinen	Audi A4 Quattro	+37.533s	19
13	21	(Italy) Moreno Soli	BMW 320i	+47.440s	18
14	9	(Italy) Angelo Lancelotti	Alfa Romeo 156	+51.325s	17
15	10	(Italy) Giovanni Gulinelli	Alfa Romeo 156	+1.08.310s	16
16	3	(Italy) Romana Bernardoni	Alfa Romeo 156	+1.23.690s	15
17	14	(Germany) Heinrich Symanzick	Opel Vectra	+1 lap	14
18	27	(Sweden) Marcus Gustafsson	Nissan Primera GT	+3 laps	13
19 DNF	18	(Italy) Sandro Sardelli	Nissan Primera GT	+4 laps	12
DNF	8	(Italy) Massimo Pigoli	Audi A4 Quattro	+10 laps	
DNF	29	(United Kingdom) Matt Neal	Nissan Primera GT	+13 laps	
DNS	12	(Italy) Sergio Sambataro	Audi A4 Quattro		

=== Championship standings after Round 9 ===
Drivers' Championship standings

Pos	Driver	Points
1	(Italy) Fabrizio Giovanardi	560
2	(Italy) Nicola Larini	544
3	(Italy) Gabriele Tarquini	544
4	(France) Fabrice Walfisch	426
5	(Italy) Sandro Sardelli	386

== Round 10 (Portugal) Autódromo do Estoril ==
Qualifying Grid 1

Pos	No	Driver	Car	Lap Time
1	3	(France) Yvan Muller	Alfa Romeo 156	1.43.818
2	4	(Italy) Gabriele Tarquini	Honda Accord	1.43.907
3	2	(Italy) Nicola Larini	Alfa Romeo 156	1.43.941
4	1	(Italy) Fabrizio Giovanardi	Alfa Romeo 156	1.43.946
5	31	(Brazil) Felipe Massa	Alfa Romeo 156	1.44.268
6	6	(United Kingdom) James Thompson	Honda Accord	1.44.686
7	5	(France) Fabrice Walfisch	Honda Accord	1.45.174
8	7	(Italy) Roberto Colciago	Audi A4 Quattro	1.45.257
9	29	(United Kingdom) Matt Neal	Nissan Primera GT	1.45.336
10	26	(Sweden) Carl Rosenblad	Nissan Primera GT	1.45.527
11	25	(Sweden) Jens Edman	Volvo S40	1.45.615
12	18	(Italy) Sandro Sardelli	Nissan Primera GT	1.45.901
13	24	(Sweden) Jan 'Flash' Nilsson	Volvo S40	1.46.001
14	27	(Sweden) Marcus Gustafsson	Nissan Primera GT	1.46.336
15	20	(Italy) Gianluca De Lorenzi	BMW 320i	1.46.352
16	9	(Italy) Angelo Lancelotti	Alfa Romeo 156	1.46.813
17	15	(France) Eric Cayrolle	BMW 320i	1.47.375
18	32	(Sweden) Tobias Johansson	Audi A4 Quattro	1.47.450
19	30	(San Marino) Stefano Valli	BMW 320i	1.47.968
20	19	(Finland) Mikko Lempinen	Audi A4 Quattro	1.48.068
21	21	(Portugal) Nelson Clemente	BMW 320i	1.48.093
22	15	(Italy) Paolo Zadra	BMW 320i	1.48.428
23	14	(Germany) Heinrich Symanzick	Opel Vectra	1.49.184
24	8	(Italy) Alberto Radaelli	Audi A4 Quattro	1.49.189
25	10	(Italy) Ettore Bonaldi	Alfa Romeo 156	1.49.849

Race 1

Pos	No	Driver	Constructor	Time/Retired	Points
1	3	(France) Yvan Muller	Alfa Romeo 156	12 laps in 21:09.671	40
2	4	(Italy) Gabriele Tarquini	Honda Accord	+0.513s	35
3	1	(Italy) Fabrizio Giovanardi	Alfa Romeo 156	+4.594s	32
4	2	(Italy) Nicola Larini	Alfa Romeo 156	+5.116s	30
5	31	(Brazil) Felipe Massa	Alfa Romeo 156	+6.347s	28
6	7	(Italy) Roberto Colciago	Audi A4 Quattro	+15.606s	26
7	24	(Sweden) Jan 'Flash' Nilsson	Volvo S40	+24.628s	24
8	20	(Italy) Gianluca De Lorenzi	BMW 320i	+26.062s	23
9	25	(Sweden) Jens Edman	Volvo S40	+29.780s	22
10	15	(France) Eric Cayrolle	BMW 320i	+34.995s	21
11	18	(Italy) Sandro Sardelli	Nissan Primera GT	+37.042s	20
12	26	(Sweden) Carl Rosenblad	Nissan Primera GT	+39.983s	19
13	19	(Finland) Mikko Lempinen	Audi A4 Quattro	+44.997s	18
14	21	(Portugal) Nelson Clemente	BMW 320i	+54.424s	17
15	27	(Sweden) Marcus Gustafsson	Nissan Primera GT	+54.856s	16
16	15	(Italy) Paolo Zadra	BMW 320i	+59.782s	15
17	9	(Italy) Angelo Lancelotti	Alfa Romeo 156	+1.03.430s	14
18	10	(Italy) Ettore Bonaldi	Alfa Romeo 156	+1.12.510s	13
19	32	(Sweden) Tobias Johansson	Audi A4 Quattro	+1 lap	12
20	30	(San Marino) Stefano Valli	BMW 320i	+ lap	11
21	8	(Italy) Alberto Radaelli	Audi A4 Quattro	+2 laps	10
22	29	(United Kingdom) Matt Neal	Nissan Primera GT	+2 laps	9
23	5	(France) Fabrice Walfisch	Honda Accord	+2 laps	8
24	6	(United Kingdom) James Thompson	Honda Accord	+2 laps	7
DSQ	14	(Germany) Heinrich Symanzick	Opel Vectra	+7 laps	

Grid 2

Pos	No	Driver	Car
1	6	(United Kingdom) James Thompson	Honda Accord
2	5	(France) Fabrice Walfisch	Honda Accord
3	29	(United Kingdom) Matt Neal	Nissan Primera GT
4	8	(Italy) Alberto Radaelli	Audi A4 Quattro
5	30	(San Marino) Stefano Valli	BMW 320i
6	32	(Sweden) Tobias Johansson	Audi A4 Quattro
7	10	(Italy) Ettore Bonaldi	Alfa Romeo 156
8	9	(Italy) Angelo Lancelotti	Alfa Romeo 156
9	15	(Italy) Paolo Zadra	BMW 320i
10	27	(Sweden) Marcus Gustafsson	Nissan Primera GT
11	21	(Portugal) Nelson Clemente	BMW 320i
12	19	(Finland) Mikko Lempinen	Audi A4 Quattro
13	26	(Sweden) Carl Rosenblad	Nissan Primera GT
14	18	(Italy) Sandro Sardelli	Nissan Primera GT
15	15	(France) Eric Cayrolle	BMW 320i
16	25	(Sweden) Jens Edman	Volvo S40
17	20	(Italy) Gianluca De Lorenzi	BMW 320i
18	24	(Sweden) Jan 'Flash' Nilsson	Volvo S40
19	7	(Italy) Roberto Colciago	Audi A4 Quattro
20	31	(Brazil) Felipe Massa	Alfa Romeo 156
21	2	(Italy) Nicola Larini	Alfa Romeo 156
22	1	(Italy) Fabrizio Giovanardi	Alfa Romeo 156
23	4	(Italy) Gabriele Tarquini	Honda Accord
24	3	(France) Yvan Muller	Alfa Romeo 156
25	14	(Germany) Heinrich Symanzick	Opel Vectra

Race 2

Pos	No	Driver	Constructor	Time/Retired	Points
1	29	(United Kingdom) Matt Neal	Nissan Primera GT	+12 laps in 21:17.229	40
2	6	(United Kingdom) James Thompson	Honda Accord	+0.361s	35
3	7	(Italy) Roberto Colciago	Audi A4 Quattro	+13.338s	32
4	2	(Italy) Nicola Larini	Alfa Romeo 156	+13.626s	30
5	1	(Italy) Fabrizio Giovanardi	Alfa Romeo 156	+17.465s	28
6	3	(France) Yvan Muller	Alfa Romeo 156	+17.758s	26
7	25	(Sweden) Jens Edman	Volvo S40	+23.120s	24
8	24	(Sweden) Jan 'Flash' Nilsson	Volvo S40	+27.277s	23
9	32	(Sweden) Tobias Johansson	Audi A4 Quattro	+38.660s	22
10	26	(Sweden) Carl Rosenblad	Nissan Primera GT	+40.762s	21
11	30	(San Marino) Stefano Valli	BMW 320i	+51.658s	20
12	15	(Italy) Paolo Zadra	BMW 320i	+1.01.044s	19
13	14	(Germany) Heinrich Symanzick	Opel Vectra	+1.05.738s	18
14	19	(Finland) Mikko Lempinen	Audi A4 Quattro	+1.08.641s	17
15	9	(Italy) Angelo Lancelotti	Alfa Romeo 156	+1.11.354s	16
16	21	(Portugal) Nelson Clemente	BMW 320i	+2 laps	15
17	18	(Italy) Sandro Sardelli	Nissan Primera GT	+3 laps	14
18	20	(Italy) Gianluca De Lorenzi	BMW 320i	+3 laps	13
DNF	27	(Sweden) Marcus Gustafsson	Nissan Primera GT	+6 laps	
DNF	31	(Brazil) Felipe Massa	Alfa Romeo 156	+7 laps	
DNF	10	(Italy) Ettore Bonaldi	Alfa Romeo 156	+8 laps	
DNF	5	(France) Fabrice Walfisch	Honda Accord	+10 laps	
DNF	8	(Italy) Alberto Radaelli	Audi A4 Quattro	+11 laps	
DNF	4	(Italy) Gabriele Tarquini	Honda Accord	+11 laps	
DNF	15	(France) Eric Cayrolle	BMW 320i	+12 laps	

=== Championship standings after Final Round 10 ===
Drivers' Championship standings

Pos	Driver	Points
1	(Italy) Fabrizio Giovanardi	620
2	(Italy) Nicola Larini	604
3	(Italy) Gabriele Tarquini	579
4	(France) Fabrice Walfisch	434
5	(Italy) Sandro Sardelli	432

== Championship standings ==
Points system
**1st**	**2nd**	**3rd**	**4th**	**5th**	**6th**	**7th**	**8th**	**9th**	**10th**	**11th**	**12th**	**13th**	**14th**	**15th**	**16th**	**17th**	**18th**	**19th**	**20th**	**21st**	**22nd**	**23rd**	**24th**	**25th**	**26th**	**27th**	**28th**	**29th**	**30th**
40	35	32	30	28	26	24	23	22	21	20	19	18	17	16	15	14	13	12	11	10	9	8	7	6	5	4	3	2	1

- No bonus points were awarded for pole positions or fastest laps. All scores counted towards the championship.

=== Drivers' Championship ===
Pos	Driver	MON (Italy)		BRN (Czech Republic)		MGN (France)		SIL (United Kingdom)		ZOL (Belgium)		HUN (Hungary)		A1R (Austria)		NÜR (Germany)		JAR (Spain)		EST (Portugal)		Pts
1	(Italy) Fabrizio Giovanardi	2	4	**2**	1	4	Ret	2	2	4	1	**1**	3	2	3	17	**4**	3	2	3	5	620
2	(Italy) Nicola Larini	1	2	1	2	**2**	2	5	3	Ret	3	12	**2**	14	**2**	1	5	4	5	4	4	604
3	(Italy) Gabriele Tarquini	**Ret**	1	Ret	3	1	Ret	**1**	1	**1**	14	2	4	**1**	1	**2**	2	**1**	1	2	Ret	579
4	(France) Fabrice Walfisch	5	5	NC	6	Ret	6	4	5	3	5	4	5	3	4	15	1	Ret	7	23	Ret	434
5	(Italy) Sandro Sardelli	4	6	Ret	4	7	Ret	6	6	10	**4**	6	6	6	14	4	7	7	19	11	17	432
6	(Italy) Roberto Colciago	3	3	Ret	9	3	1	DNS	Ret	2	Ret	3	1	4	Ret	16	3	Ret	8	6	3	423
7	(Italy) Gianluca de Lorenzi	6	Ret	DNS	5	9	3	7	8	5	6			5	5	5	6	6	3	8	18	413
8	(Italy) Paolo Zadra	13	10	10	14	10	10	13	15	9	9	13	9	9	6	14	16	15	10	16	12	388
9	(France) Éric Cayrolle	10	Ret	5	7	6	Ret	11	7	11	10	5	Ret	10	12	12	9	8	11	10	Ret	357
10	(Finland) Mikko Lempinen			4	Ret	Ret	11	9	11	13	15	8	7	15	8	6	10	9	12	13	14	335
11	(Italy) Angelo Lancelotti	9	7	DSQ	DNS	Ret	8	12	9	6	7	7	Ret	7	10	7	8	Ret	14	17	15	323
12	(Italy) Romana Bernardoni	8	Ret	9	Ret	13	DNS	15	**16**	8	11	10	11	8	13	10	17	11	16			289
13	(Italy) Max Pigoli	7	8	3	8	5	5	10	12	Ret	DNS	Ret	Ret	11	Ret	8	11	16	**Ret**			276
14	(United Kingdom) Matt Neal					Ret	4	3	4	DSQ	2	14	DNS			3	18	5	Ret	22	1	266
15	(Germany) Heinrich Symanzick	11	11	11	**11**	DNS	DNS	DNS	14	12	13	15	DNS	12	9	11	12	DNS	17	DSQ	13	262
16	(Italy) Enrico Toccacelo	17	13	7	10	8	7	8	10	Ret	12	9	8									232
17	(Italy) Gianluca Roda	Ret	9	6	15	12	**9**	DNS	13	7	8	Ret	DNS			9	14					209
18	(Italy) Moreno Soli											11	10	Ret	11	13	13	10	13			136
19	(Italy) Sergio Sambataro	12	14	8	12	11	Ret	14	17			DNS	DNS	Ret	Ret			Ret	DNS	DNS	DNS	129
20	(United Kingdom) James Thompson																	2	4	24	**2**	107
21	(Sweden) Carl Rosenblad																	12	9	12	10	81
22	(San Marino) Stefano Valli													13	7					20	11	73
23	(Brazil) Felipe Massa																	14	6	5	Ret	71
24	(France) Yvan Muller																			**1**	6	66
25	(Sweden) Jan 'Flash' Nilsson	16	**Ret**																	7	8	62
26	(Italy) Giovanni Gulinelli															Ret	15	13	15			50
27	(Sweden) Jens Edman																			9	7	46
28	(Italy) Antonio Materia	14	12																			36
29	(Sweden) Tobias Johansson																			19	9	34
30	(Italy) Guido Lucchetti Cigarini	15	Ret	Ret	13	Ret	Ret															34
31	(Portugal) Nelson Clemente																			14	16	32
32	(Sweden) Marcus Gustafsson																	Ret	18	15	Ret	29
33	(Italy) Ettore Bonaldi																			18	Ret	13
34	(Italy) Alberto Radaelli																			21	Ret	10
NC	(Italy) Salvatore Deplano													DNS	DNS							0
Pos	Driver	MON (Italy)		BRN (Czech Republic)		MGN (France)		SIL (United Kingdom)		ZOL (Belgium)		HUN (Hungary)		A1R (Austria)		NÜR (Germany)		JAR (Spain)		EST (Portugal)		Pts

Colour	Result
Gold	Winner
Silver	Second place
Bronze	Third place
Green	Points classification
Blue	Non-points classification
Blue	Non-classified finish (NC)
Purple	Retired, not classified (Ret)
Red	Did not qualify (DNQ)
Red	Did not pre-qualify (DNPQ)
Black	Disqualified (DSQ)
White	Did not start (DNS)
White	Withdrew (WD)
White	Race cancelled (C)
Blank	Did not practice (DNP)
Blank	Did not arrive (DNA)
Blank	Excluded (EX)

**Bold** - Pole
Italics - Fastest lap

=== Teams' Championship ===
Points system
**1st**	**2nd**	**3rd**	**4th**	**5th**	**6th**	**7th**	**8th**	**9th**	**10th**	**11th**	**12th**	**13th**	**14th**	**15th**	**16th**	**17th**	**18th**	**19th**	**20th**	**21st**	**22nd**	**23rd**	**24th**	**25th**	**26th**	**27th**	**28th**	**29th**	**30th**
40	35	32	30	28	26	24	23	22	21	20	19	18	17	16	15	14	13	12	11	10	9	8	7	6	5	4	3	2	1

- only the two highest placed cars from each team scored points. No bonus points were awarded for pole positions or fastest laps. All scores counted towards the championship.

Pos	Driver	MON (Italy)		BRN (Czech Republic)		MGN (France)		SIL (United Kingdom)		ZOL (Belgium)		HUN (Hungary)		A1R (Austria)		NÜR (Germany)		JAR (Spain)		EST (Portugal)		Pts
1	Alfa Romeo Team Nordauto	1	2	1	1	2	2	2	2	4	1	1	2	2	2	1	4	3	2	1	4	1272
1	Alfa Romeo Team Nordauto	2	4	2	2	4	Ret	5	3	8	3	10	3	8	3	10	5	4	5	3	5	1272
2	JAS Engineering Italia IP	5	1	NC	3	1	6	1	1	1	5	2	4	1	1	2	1	1	1	2	2	1089
2	JAS Engineering Italia IP	Ret	5	Ret	6	Ret	Ret	4	5	3	14	4	5	3	4	15	2	2	4	23	Ret	1089
3	Max Team	10	10	5	7	6	10	11	7	9	9	5	9	9	6	12	9	8	10	10	12	745
3	Max Team	13	Ret	10	14	10	Ret	13	15	11	10	13	Ret	10	12	14	16	15	11	16	Ret	745
4	AGS Motorsport	3	3	3	8	3	1	10	12	2	Ret	3	1	4	Ret	8	3	16	8	6	3	709
4	AGS Motorsport	7	8	Ret	9	5	5	DNS	Ret	Ret	DNS	Ret	Ret	11	Ret	16	11	Ret	Ret	21	Ret	709
5	Conrero	9	7	7	10	8	7	8	9	6	7	7	8	7	10	7	8	13	14	17	15	618
5	Conrero	17	13	DSQ	DNS	Ret	8	12	10	Ret	12	9	Ret	DNS	DNS	Ret	15	Ret	15	18	Ret	618
6	GDL Racing	6	Ret	DNS	5	9	3	7	8	5	6	11	10	5	5	5	6	6	3	8	11	610
6	GDL Racing													13	7	13	13	10	13	14	16	610
7	PRO Motorsport	4	6	Ret	4	7	Ret	6	6	10	4	6	6	6	14	4	7	7	19	11	17	432
8	Lehtonen Motorsport			4	Ret	Ret	11	9	11	13	15	8	7	15	8	6	10	9	12	13	14	335
9	RJN Motorsport					Ret	4	3	4	DSQ	2	14	DNS			3	18	5	Ret	22	1	266
10	Raceline Racing Team	11	11	11	11	DNS	DNS	DNS	14	12	13	15	DNS	12	9	11	12	DNS	17	DSQ	13	262
11	Greyhound Motorsport	Ret	9	6	15	12	9	DNS	13	7	8	Ret	DNS			9	14					209
12	Racing Box	12	14	8	12	11	Ret	14	17			DNS	DNS	Ret	Ret			Ret	DNS	DNS	DNS	129
13	Crawford Nissan Racing																	12	9	12	10	110
13	Crawford Nissan Racing																	Ret	18	15	Ret	110
14	Volvo S40 Racing Team Sweden	16	Ret																	7	7	108
14	Volvo S40 Racing Team Sweden																			9	8	108
15	Antonio Materia	14	12																			36
16	Brovallen Motorsport																			19	9	34
17	P.S.G.R. - Nath Racing	15	Ret	Ret	13	Ret	Ret															34
Pos	Driver	MON (Italy)		BRN (Czech Republic)		MGN (France)		SIL (United Kingdom)		ZOL (Belgium)		HUN (Hungary)		A1R (Austria)		NÜR (Germany)		JAR (Spain)		EST (Portugal)		Pts

Colour	Result
Gold	Winner
Silver	Second place
Bronze	Third place
Green	Points classification
Blue	Non-points classification
Blue	Non-classified finish (NC)
Purple	Retired, not classified (Ret)
Red	Did not qualify (DNQ)
Red	Did not pre-qualify (DNPQ)
Black	Disqualified (DSQ)
White	Did not start (DNS)
White	Withdrew (WD)
White	Race cancelled (C)
Blank	Did not practice (DNP)
Blank	Did not arrive (DNA)
Blank	Excluded (EX)

=== Amateurs' Trophy ===
Points system
**1st**	**2nd**	**3rd**	**4th**	**5th**	**6th**	**7th**	**8th**	**9th**	**10th**	**11th**	**12th**	**13th**	**14th**	**15th**	**16th**	**17th**	**18th**	**19th**	**20th**	**21st**	**22nd**	**23rd**	**24th**	**25th**	**26th**	**27th**	**28th**	**29th**	**30th**
40	35	32	30	28	26	24	23	22	21	20	19	18	17	16	15	14	13	12	11	10	9	8	7	6	5	4	3	2	1

- No bonus points were awarded for pole positions or fastest laps. All scores counted towards the championship.

Pos	Driver	MON (Italy)		BRN (Czech Republic)		MGN (France)		SIL (United Kingdom)		ZOL (Belgium)		HUN (Hungary)		A1R (Austria)		NÜR (Germany)		JAR (Spain)		EST (Portugal)		Pts
1	(Italy) Sandro Sardelli	4	6	Ret	4	7	Ret	6	6	10	4	6	6	6	14	4	7	7	19	11	17	627
2	(Italy) Gianluca de Lorenzi	6	Ret	DNS	5	9	3	7	8	5	6			5	5	5	6	6	3	8	18	581
3	(Italy) Paolo Zadra	13	10	10	14	10	10	13	15	9	9	13	9	9	6	14	16	15	10	16	12	545
4	(France) Éric Cayrolle	10	Ret	5	7	6	Ret	11	7	11	10	5	Ret	10	12	12	9	8	11	10	Ret	486
5	(Finland) Mikko Lempinen			4	Ret	Ret	11	9	11	13	15	8	7	15	8	6	10	9	12	13	14	462
6	(Italy) Angelo Lancelotti	9	7	DSQ	DNS	Ret	8	12	9	6	7	7	Ret	7	10	7	8	Ret	14	17	15	454
7	(Italy) Max Pigoli	7	8	3	8	5	5	10	12	Ret	DNS	Ret	Ret	11	Ret	8	11	16	Ret			365
8	(Germany) Heinrich Symanzick	11	11	11	11	DNS	DNS	DNS	14	12	13	15	DNS	12	9	11	12	DNS	17	DSQ	13	355
9	(Italy) Enrico Toccacelo	17	13	7	10	8	7	8	10	Ret	12	9	8									308
10	(Italy) Gianluca Roda	Ret	9	6	15	12	9	DNS	13	7	8	Ret	DNS			9	14					267
11	(Italy) Sergio Sambataro	12	14	8	12	11	Ret	14	17			DNS	DNS	Ret	Ret			Ret	DNS	DNS	DNS	163
12	(Italy) Giovanni Gulinelli															Ret	15	13	15			76
13	(Italy) Ettore Bonaldi																			18	Ret	24
14	(Italy) Alberto Radaelli																			21	Ret	23
NC	(Italy) Salvatore Deplano													DNS	DNS							0
Pos	Driver	MON (Italy)		BRN (Czech Republic)		MGN (France)		SIL (United Kingdom)		ZOL (Belgium)		HUN (Hungary)		A1R (Austria)		NÜR (Germany)		JAR (Spain)		EST (Portugal)		Pts

Colour	Result
Gold	Winner
Silver	Second place
Bronze	Third place
Green	Points classification
Blue	Non-points classification
Blue	Non-classified finish (NC)
Purple	Retired, not classified (Ret)
Red	Did not qualify (DNQ)
Red	Did not pre-qualify (DNPQ)
Black	Disqualified (DSQ)
White	Did not start (DNS)
White	Withdrew (WD)
White	Race cancelled (C)
Blank	Did not practice (DNP)
Blank	Did not arrive (DNA)
Blank	Excluded (EX)

== Championship standings ==
Points system
**1st**	**2nd**	**3rd**	**4th**	**5th**	**6th**	**7th**	**8th**	**9th**	**10th**
20	15	12	10	8	6	4	3	2	1

- No bonus points were awarded for pole positions or fastest laps. All scores counted towards the championship.

Pos	Driver	MON (Italy)	BRN (Czech Republic)	MGN (France)	SIL (United Kingdom)	ZOL (Belgium)	HUN (Hungary)	A1R (Austria)	NÜR (Germany)	JAR (Spain)	EST (Portugal)	Pts
1	(Netherlands) Peter Kox	1	**1**	Ret	**1**	**2**	2	9	2	4	DSQ	117
2	(Netherlands) Duncan Huisman	2	2	**1**	3	1	**1**	Ret	3	Ret	Ret	114
3	(Norway) Tommy Rustad	6	4	3	5	Ret	14	**3**	**1**	**1**	**11**	88
4	(Germany) Norman Simon	4	3	Ret	2	3	15	1	4	Ret	Ret	79
5	(Italy) Gianni Morbidelli	**3**	Ret	4	4	11	13	2	5	Ret	1	75
6	(Italy) Paolo Ruberti	7	Ret	2	Ret	Ret	3	6	8	6	9	48
7	(Sweden) Peggen Andersson	5	Ret	5	13	4	4	8	9	9	8	46
8	(Italy) Tobia Masini	Ret	5	Ret	Ret	5	6	Ret	6	2	Ret	43
9	(Spain) Luis Villamil	9	6	8	11	9	7	Ret	7	12	5	29
10	(United Kingdom) James Hanson	11	7	Ret	7	7	Ret	Ret	14	3	Ret	24
11	(Italy) Stefano Gabellini	Ret	Ret	Ret	8	DNS	8	4	15	7	7	24
12	(United Kingdom) Tom Ferrier	10	9	9	Ret	Ret	5	Ret	12	8	6	22
13	(Netherlands) Sandor van Es										2	15
14	(Italy) Fulvio Cavicchi		8	7	10	8	9	Ret	13			13
15	(Netherlands) Tom Coronel										3	12
16	(Netherlands) Donald Molenaar										4	10
17	(Belgium) Jean-Michel Martin							5	10			9
18	(Belgium) Guino Kenis	8		6								9
19	(Italy) Salvatore Tavano									5	Ret	8
20	(Finland) Markus Palttala					6	10	Ret	11			7
21	(Belgium) Frédéric Bouvy				6	Ret						6
22	(Italy) Simone di Luca						Ret	7	Ret	13	10	5
23	(Italy) Ettore Bonaldi	12	11	10	12	10	11	10		10		4
24	(United Kingdom) Matt Kelly				9							2
25	(Belgium) Patrick Beliën		10								12	1
26	(Belgium) Peter Beckers						12			11		0
27	(Lithuania) Egidijus Dapsas		12									0
28	(United Kingdom) Alan Blencowe										13	0
NC	(Italy) Giacomo Bertola	Ret										0
NC	(Italy) Andrea Bacci							Ret				0
NC	(Italy) Alberto Viglione							Ret				0
NC	(Germany) Franz Engstler								Ret			0
NC	(Germany) Andreas Klinge								Ret			0
NC	(Netherlands) Frans Verschuur										Ret	0
NC	(Italy) Romana Bernardoni										Ret	0
NC	(Italy) Riccardo Tarabelli	DNS										0
NC	(Sweden) Benny Larsson										DNS	0
Pos	Driver	MON (Italy)	BRN (Czech Republic)	MGN (France)	SIL (United Kingdom)	ZOL (Belgium)	HUN (Hungary)	A1R (Austria)	NÜR (Germany)	JAR (Spain)	EST (Portugal)	Pts

Colour	Result
Gold	Winner
Silver	Second place
Bronze	Third place
Green	Points classification
Blue	Non-points classification
Blue	Non-classified finish (NC)
Purple	Retired, not classified (Ret)
Red	Did not qualify (DNQ)
Red	Did not pre-qualify (DNPQ)
Black	Disqualified (DSQ)
White	Did not start (DNS)
White	Withdrew (WD)
White	Race cancelled (C)
Blank	Did not practice (DNP)
Blank	Did not arrive (DNA)
Blank	Excluded (EX)

**Bold** - Pole
Italics - Fastest lap

=== Teams' Championship ===
Points were awarded on a 20, 15, 12, 10, 8, 6, 4, 3, 2, 1 basis to the top 10 finishers in each race, however only the two highest placed cars from each team scored points. No bonus points were awarded for pole positions or fastest laps. All scores counted towards the championship.

Pos	Driver	MON (Italy)	BRN (Czech Republic)	MGN (France)	SIL (United Kingdom)	ZOL (Belgium)	HUN (Hungary)	A1R (Austria)	NÜR (Germany)	JAR (Spain)	EST (Portugal)	Pts
1	Carly Motorsport	2	2	1	3	1	1	5	3	9	2	199
1	Carly Motorsport	5	10	5	6	4	4	8	9	11	3	199
2	ROAL Motorsport	1	1	Ret	1	2	2	1	2	4	Ret	196
2	ROAL Motorsport	4	3	Ret	2	3	15	9	4	Ret	DSQ	196
3	CiBiEmme Team	3	Ret	2	4	11	3	2	5	6	1	139
3	CiBiEmme Team	7	Ret	4	8	Ret	8	4	8	7	7	139
4	RJN Motorsport	6	4	3	5	Ret	14	3	1	1	10	95
4	RJN Motorsport				9		Ret	7	Ret	13	11	95
5	Edenbridge Racing	10	7	9	7	7	5	Ret	12	3	6	46
5	Edenbridge Racing	11	9	Ret	Ret	Ret	Ret	Ret	14	8	Ret	46
6	Tobia Masini	Ret	5	Ret	Ret	5	6	Ret	6	2	Ret	43
7	Club Jarama RACE	9	6	8	11	9	7	Ret	7	12	5	29
8	Conrero	12	8	7	10	8	9	10	13	5	Ret	25
8	Conrero		11	10	12	10	11	Ret		10	Ret	25
9	Renault Dealer Team Holland										4	10
9	Renault Dealer Team Holland										Ret	10
10	GDL Racing					6	10	Ret	11			7
11	Oktanas		12									0
12	GA Racing										13	0
12	GA Racing										DNS	0
NC	Autofficina Rally							Ret				0
NC	Autofficina Rally							Ret				0
NC	Engstler Centro Sportivo								Ret			0
NC	Engstler Centro Sportivo								Ret			0
NC	Scuderia Veregra	Ret										0
NC	Scuderia Veregra	DNS										0
Pos	Driver	MON (Italy)	BRN (Czech Republic)	MGN (France)	SIL (United Kingdom)	ZOL (Belgium)	HUN (Hungary)	A1R (Austria)	NÜR (Germany)	JAR (Spain)	EST (Portugal)	Pts

Colour	Result
Gold	Winner
Silver	Second place
Bronze	Third place
Green	Points classification
Blue	Non-points classification
Blue	Non-classified finish (NC)
Purple	Retired, not classified (Ret)
Red	Did not qualify (DNQ)
Red	Did not pre-qualify (DNPQ)
Black	Disqualified (DSQ)
White	Did not start (DNS)
White	Withdrew (WD)
White	Race cancelled (C)
Blank	Did not practice (DNP)
Blank	Did not arrive (DNA)
Blank	Excluded (EX)

=== Under 25 Trophy ===
Points were awarded on a 20, 15, 12, 10, 8, 6, 4, 3, 2, 1 basis to the top 10 finishers in each race. No bonus points were awarded for pole positions or fastest laps. All scores counted towards the championship.

Pos	Driver	MON (Italy)	BRN (Czech Republic)	MGN (France)	SIL (United Kingdom)	ZOL (Belgium)	HUN (Hungary)	A1R (Austria)	NÜR (Germany)	JAR (Spain)	EST (Portugal)	Pts
1	(Germany) Norman Simon	4	3	Ret	2	3	15	1	4	Ret	Ret	128
2	(United Kingdom) Tom Ferrier	10	9	9	Ret	Ret	5	Ret	12	8	6	98
3	(Italy) Tobia Masini	Ret	5	Ret	Ret	5	6	Ret	6	2	Ret	80
4	(Italy) Fulvio Cavicchi		8	7	10	8	9	Ret	13			70
5	(United Kingdom) James Hanson	11	7	Ret	7	7	Ret	Ret	14	3	Ret	70
6	(Italy) Simone di Luca						Ret	7	Ret	13	10	38
7	(Finland) Markus Palttala					6	10	Ret	11			34
8	(Italy) Salvatore Tavano									5	Ret	12
Pos	Driver	MON (Italy)	BRN (Czech Republic)	MGN (France)	SIL (United Kingdom)	ZOL (Belgium)	HUN (Hungary)	A1R (Austria)	NÜR (Germany)	JAR (Spain)	EST (Portugal)	Pts

Colour	Result
Gold	Winner
Silver	Second place
Bronze	Third place
Green	Points classification
Blue	Non-points classification
Blue	Non-classified finish (NC)
Purple	Retired, not classified (Ret)
Red	Did not qualify (DNQ)
Red	Did not pre-qualify (DNPQ)
Black	Disqualified (DSQ)
White	Did not start (DNS)
White	Withdrew (WD)
White	Race cancelled (C)
Blank	Did not practice (DNP)
Blank	Did not arrive (DNA)
Blank	Excluded (EX)
