= Antonio Matera =

Italian footballer (born 1996)

Personal information
- Date of birth: 11 October 1996 (age 30)
- Place of birth: San Severo, Italy
- Height: 1.80 m (5 ft 11 in)
- Position: Midfielder

Youth career
- Barletta

Senior career*
Years	Team	Apps	(Gls)
2014	Barletta	1	(0)
2014–2018	Fidelis Andria	92	(5)
2017	→ Benevento (loan)	6	(0)
2018–2019	Potenza	26	(0)
2019–2021	Cavese	50	(2)
2021–2023	Avellino	49	(3)
2023–2024	Turris	15	(0)
2024–2025	Taranto	28	(0)
2025–2026	Sorrento	22	(0)
- * Club domestic league appearances and goals as of 1 May 2026

Antonio Matera (born 11 October 1996) is an Italian professional footballer who plays as a midfielder.

== Career ==
Matera made his professional debut in the Lega Pro for Barletta on 6 April 2014, in a game against Pontedera.

On 11 July 2019, he signed a two-year contract with Cavese.

On 19 July 2021, Matera joined Avellino.

On 1 September 2023, he moved to Turris on a two-year contract.

On 30 January 2024, Matera signed a one-and-a-half-year deal with Taranto.

On 9 January 2025, he joined Sorrento on a permanent basis.
