= Peter Beckers =

Scottish footballer

Personal information
- Full name: Peter Beckers
- Date of birth: 3 October 1947
- Place of birth: Dundee, Scotland
- Date of death: 6 June 1996 (aged 48)
- Place of death: Skegness, Lincolnshire, England
- Position: Winger

Senior career*
Years	Team	Apps	(Gls)
1963–1964	Craigmore Thistle		
1964–1967	Grimsby Town	1	(0)
1967–19??	Skegness Town		
- * Club domestic league appearances and goals

Peter Beckers (3 October 1947 – 6 June 1996) was a Scottish professional footballer who played as a winger.
