= 2005 Italian Superturismo Championship =

Seasons
- ← 1999 2006 →

The 2005 Campionato Italiano Superturismo season was the fourth season of the Italian Superturismo Championship since its recreation in 2002. It was won by well-known former Formula One and CART driver Alessandro Zanardi.

== Teams and drivers ==
Team	Car	No.	Drivers	Rounds	Class
BMW Team Italy-Spain	BMW 320i	4	(Italy) Alessandro Zanardi	1-4, 6	
(Finland) Lehtonen Motorsport	SEAT Toledo Cupra	19	(Finland) Valle Mäkelä	1-2	
(Italy) JAS Motorsport	Honda Accord	27	(Italy) Adriano de Micheli	1-3	
(Italy) Proteam Motorsport	BMW 320i	30	(Italy) Stefano D'Aste	1-3	
(Italy) Proteam Motorsport	BMW 320i	31	(Italy) Giuseppe Cirò	1-3	
(Italy) DB Motorsport	Alfa Romeo 156 GTA	51	(Italy) Salvatore Tavano	All	
(Italy) DB Motorsport	Alfa Romeo 156 GTA	52	(Italy) Andrea Larini	1-4, 6-7	
(Italy) GDL Racing	BMW 320i	53	(Italy) Gianluca De Lorenzi	All	
(San Marino) ZeroCinque Motorsport	BMW 320i	54	(San Marino) Stefano Valli	All	
(Italy) Scuderia del Girasole	SEAT Toledo Cupra	55	(Italy) Alessandro Balzan	All	
(Italy) DB Motorsport	Alfa Romeo 156 GTA	56	(Italy) Vitaliano Caldarelli	5	
(Italy) Proteam Motorsport	BMW 320i	57	(Italy) Davide Roda	7	
(Italy) Proteam Motorsport	BMW 320i	58	(Italy) Luca Rangoni	7	
(United Kingdom) GR Asia	SEAT Toledo Cupra	59	(Netherlands) Tom Coronel	7	
(Germany) Engstler Motorsport	BMW 320i	62	(Germany) Franz Engstler	7	
(San Marino) ZeroCinque Motorsport	BMW 320i	81	(Italy) Giannantonio Pennino	4	SP
(Italy) Errepi Racing	Alfa Romeo 147	82	(Italy) Lorenzo Falessi	5,7	SP
(San Marino) ZeroCinque Motorsport	BMW 320i	83	(Italy) Lorenzo Pasquinelli	5-7	SP

Icon	Class
SP	Super Production

== Race calendar and results ==
Round		Circuit	Date	Pole position	Fastest lap	Winning driver	Winning team
1	R1	(Italy) Monza	10 April	(Italy) Alessandro Zanardi	(Italy) Alessandro Zanardi	(Italy) Alessandro Zanardi	BMW Team Italy-Spain
1	R2	(Italy) Monza	10 April		(Italy) Alessandro Zanardi	(Italy) Alessandro Zanardi	BMW Team Italy-Spain
2	R1	(France) Magny-Cours	1 May	(Finland) Valle Mäkelä	(Italy) Alessandro Zanardi	(Italy) Alessandro Zanardi	BMW Team Italy-Spain
2	R2	(France) Magny-Cours	1 May		(Finland) Valle Mäkelä	(Italy) Giuseppe Cirò	(Italy) Proteam Motorsport
3	R1	(Italy) Imola	29 May	(Italy) Adriano de Micheli	(Italy) Alessandro Balzan	(Italy) Alessandro Zanardi	BMW Team Italy-Spain
3	R2	(Italy) Imola	29 May		(Italy) Alessandro Zanardi	(Italy) Alessandro Zanardi	BMW Team Italy-Spain
4	R1	(Italy) Mugello	3 July	(Italy) Alessandro Zanardi	(Italy) Gianluca De Lorenzi	(Italy) Gianluca De Lorenzi	(Italy) GDL Racing
4	R2	(Italy) Mugello	3 July		(Italy) Salvatore Tavano	(Italy) Alessandro Zanardi	BMW Team Italy-Spain
5	R1	(Italy) Magione	24 July	(Italy) Salvatore Tavano	(Italy) Gianluca De Lorenzi	(Italy) Gianluca De Lorenzi	(Italy) GDL Racing
5	R2	(Italy) Magione	24 July		(Italy) Gianluca De Lorenzi	(Italy) Alessandro Balzan	(Italy) Scuderia del Girasole
6	R1	(Italy) Varano	11 September	(Italy) Alessandro Zanardi	(Italy) Alessandro Zanardi	(Italy) Alessandro Zanardi	BMW Team Italy-Spain
6	R2	(Italy) Varano	11 September		(Italy) Alessandro Zanardi	(Italy) Alessandro Zanardi	BMW Team Italy-Spain
7	R1	(Italy) Vallelunga	16 October	(Italy) Salvatore Tavano	(Netherlands) Tom Coronel	(Italy) Alessandro Balzan	(Italy) Scuderia del Girasole
7	R2	(Italy) Vallelunga	16 October		(Italy) Gianluca De Lorenzi	(Italy) Alessandro Balzan	(Italy) Scuderia del Girasole

- Rounds 1–2 were run together with the WTCC.

== Championship standings ==
Points system
1st	2nd	3rd	4th	5th	6th	7th	8th
10	8	6	5	4	6	2	1

- 12 results from 14 are valid for the championship

=== Drivers' Championship ===
Pos	Driver	Car	MON (Italy)		MGN (France)		IMO (Italy)		MUG (Italy)		MAG (Italy)		VAR (Italy)		VAL (Italy)		Pts
1	(Italy) Alessandro Zanardi	BMW	1	1	1	6	1	1	2	1	Ret	Ret	1	1			91
2	(Italy) Gianluca De Lorenzi	BMW	7	Ret	4	3	4	3	1	2	1	2	4	Ret	3	2	79
3	(Italy) Salvatore Tavano	Alfa Romeo	3	4	3	2	3	4	3	3	5	3	2	4	2	3	76 (85)
4	(Italy) Alessandro Balzan	Seat	4	2	Ret	DNS	2	Ret	Ret	7	2	1	Ret	6	1	1	64
5	(San Marino) Stefano Valli	BMW	8	6	7	5	7	Ret	4	5	4	5	5	3	5	6	46 (47)
6	(Italy) Andrea Larini	Alfa Romeo	5	7	Ret	Ret	6	5	Ret	4			3	2	4	5	41
7	(Italy) Stefano D'Aste	BMW	2	8	Ret	Ret	5	2									21
8	(Italy) Giuseppe Cirò	BMW	Ret	5	5	1	Ret	Ret									18
9	(Italy) Adriano de Micheli	Honda	6	3	6	4	Ret	Ret									17
10	(Italy) Lorenzo Pasquinelli	BMW									7	7	Ret	5	6	8	12
11	(Italy) Vitaliano Caldarelli	Alfa Romeo									3	4					11
12	(Finland) Valle Mäkelä	Seat	Ret	Ret	2	Ret											8
13	(Italy) Lorenzo Falessi	Alfa Romeo									6	6			7	Ret	8
14	(Italy) Giannantonio Pennino	BMW							5	6							7
15	(Germany) Franz Engstler	BMW													8	4	6
16	(Netherlands) Tom Coronel	Seat													Ret	7	2

Colour	Result
Gold	Winner
Silver	Second place
Bronze	Third place
Green	Points classification
Blue	Non-points classification
Blue	Non-classified finish (NC)
Purple	Retired, not classified (Ret)
Red	Did not qualify (DNQ)
Red	Did not pre-qualify (DNPQ)
Black	Disqualified (DSQ)
White	Did not start (DNS)
White	Withdrew (WD)
White	Race cancelled (C)
Blank	Did not practice (DNP)
Blank	Did not arrive (DNA)
Blank	Excluded (EX)
