= Fabrizio De Simone =

Italian racing driver

Fabrizio de Simone
- Nationality: (Italy) Italian
- Born: 30 March 1971 (age 55)

Previous series
- 2006–2007 2004–2005 2003–2005 2000, 2002 1997–1999: Le Mans Series; American Le Mans Series; FIA GT Championship; European Touring Car Championship; Italian Superturismo Championship

Fabrizio De Simone (born 30 March 1971) is an Italian former racing driver. He was a test driver for Jordan Grand Prix in 1995 and 1996.

De Simone later raced in touring cars, racing between 1997 and 1999 in the Italian Superturismo Championship and later in 2000 and 2002 in the European Touring Car Championship. De Simone spent the remainder of his career in sports car racing, racing Maserati and Ferrari sports cars in series such as the FIA GT Championship, American Le Mans Series, and Le Mans Series.

== Racing record ==
=== Complete Italian Superturismo Championship results ===
(key) (Races in bold indicate pole position) (Races in italics indicate fastest lap)

Year	Team	Car	1	2	3	4	5	6	7	8	9	10	11	12	13	14	15	16	17	18	19	20	DC	Pts
1997	CiBiEmme Engineering	BMW 320i	MNZ; 1 Ret	MNZ; 2; 3	MUG; 1 Ret	MUG; 2; 7	**MAG**; **1**; 2	MAG; 2; 2	IMO; 1; 3	IMO; 2; 3	IMO; 1 DSQ	IMO; 2; 4	BIN; 1 Ret	BIN; 2 Ret	PER; 1; 10	PER; 2; 3	VAR; 1 Ret	VAR; 2; 5	MIS; 1; 3	MIS; 2; 3	VAL; 1; 3	VAL; 2; 1	4th	157
1998	CiBiEmme Engineering	BMW 320i	**BIN**; **1**; 1	**BIN**; **2** Ret	IMO; 1; 2	IMO; 2; 1	MNZ; 1; 4	MNZ; 2 Ret	VAR; 1; 2	VAR; 2 Ret	VAL; 1; 3	VAL; 2 Ret	MAG; 1; 4	MAG; 2; 1	PER; 1; 4	PER; 2; 5	MIS; 1; 3	MIS; 2; 6	MNZ; 1; 7	MNZ; 2; 5	VAL; 1 DNS	VAL; 2 DNS	4th	238
1999	CiBiEmme Engineering	BMW 320i	MIS; 1; 1	**MIS**; **2**; 1	BIN; 1; 4	BIN; 2; 2	IMO; 1; 3	IMO; 2; 2	PER; 1; 6	PER; 2; 5	MAG; 1 Ret	MAG; 2; 4	MUG; 1; 3	MUG; 2; 5	MIS; 1; 3	MIS; 2; 4	VAR; 1; 4	VAR; 2; 4	MNZ; 1; 6	MNZ; 2 Ret	VAL; 1; 4	VAL; 2; 3	5th	314

=== Complete European Touring Car Championship results ===
(key) (Races in bold indicate pole position) (Races in italics indicate fastest lap)

Year	Team	Car	1	2	3	4	5	6	7	8	9	10	11	12	13	14	15	16	17	18	19	20	DC	Pts
2000	AGS Motorsport	Audi A4 Quattro	MUG; 1	MUG; 2	PER; 1	PER; 2	A1R; 1	A1R; 2	MNZ; 1	MNZ; 2	HUN; 1	HUN; 2	IMO; 1	IMO; 2	MIS; 1	MIS; 2	BRN; 1	BRN; 2	VAL; 1 Ret	VAL; 2; 8	MOB; 1 DNS	MOB; 2 DNS	21st	3
2002	Ravaglia Motorsport	BMW 320i	MAG; 1; 9	MAG; 2; 9	SIL; 1; 12	SIL; 2; 9	BRN; 1; 14	BRN; 2; 9	JAR; 1; 9	JAR; 2 Ret	AND; 1; 7	AND; 2; 14	OSC; 1; 5	OSC; 2; 5	SPA; 1 Ret	SPA; 2 DNS	PER; 1; 6	PER; 2 Ret	DON; 1 Ret	DON; 2 DNS	EST; 1 Ret	EST; 2 DNS	13th	5
