= Roberto Colciago =

Italian racecar driver

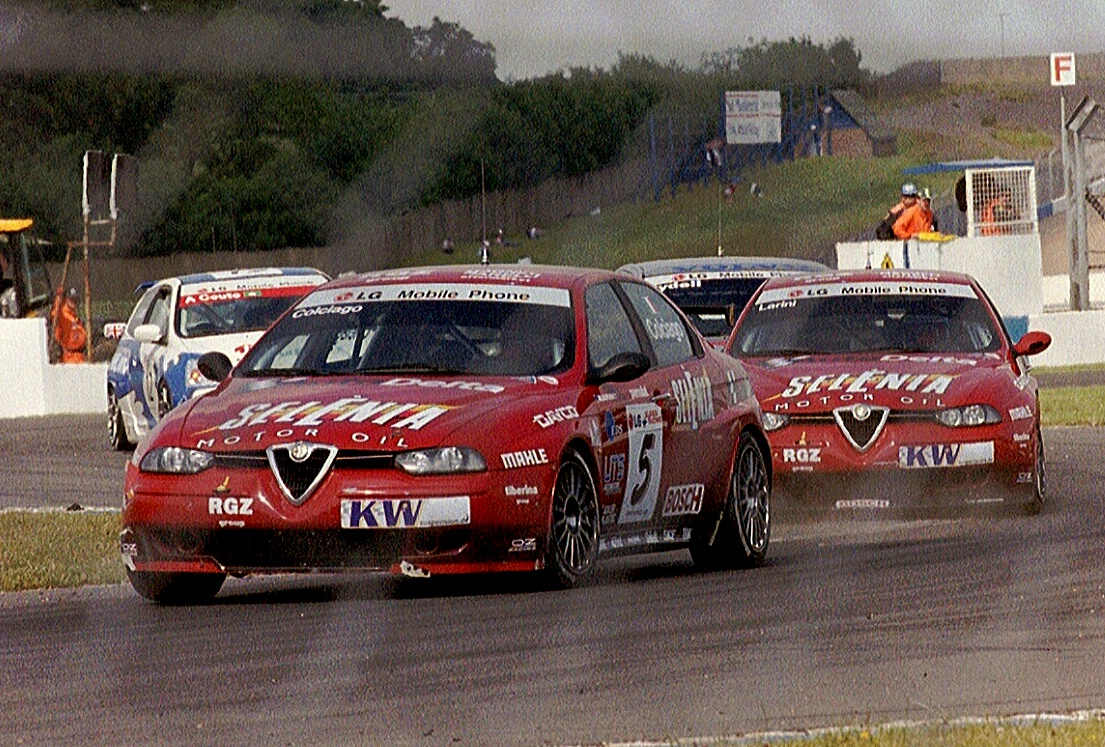
- Roberto Colciago leading Nicola Larini during the 2003 European Touring Car Championship
- Nationality: Italian
- Born: 4 April 1968 (age 58) Saronno, Italy

Previous series
- 2010 2009 2008 2007 2006 2006 2005 2003 2002 2002 2001 2001 2000 2000 1999 1998 1997 1996 1996 1995 1992, 1994 1993–94 1993 1991 1987–1990,: CITE; CITE; CITE; WTCC; WTCC; ITCC; WTCC; ETCC; ETCC; STCC; Euro STC; STCC; Euro STC; STCC; Italian Superturismo; Italian Superturismo; Italian Superturismo; Italian Superturismo; CET; Italian Superturismo; Italian F3 Championship; German F3 Championship; Japanese F3 Championship; International Formula 3000; Italian F3 Championship

Championship titles
- 2009 2006 2002 2001 1990: CITE; ITCC; STCC; STCC; Italian F3 Championship

Roberto Colciago (born 4 April 1968) is an Italian racing driver. He has spent most of his career in touring car racing – first in Super Touring and then in Super 2000 – followed by the World Touring Car Championship and currently races in the TCR International series. His major successes include two Swedish Touring Car Championship drivers' titles and the Italian Touring Car Championship title. He is married, with one daughter.

== Career history ==
After a period in karting, Colciago entered the Italian Formula Three Championship at the age of 19. He was classified in fifth position in the 1987 standings, with one race win in his rookie season, and went on to win the title in 1990. From there, he progressed to the FIA Formula 3000 International Championship, but returned to Italian F3 in 1992 and then spent two further seasons in the German F3 Championship.

1995 brought Colciago into touring cars. He participated in the Italian and Spanish Super Touring Championships, with eighth and tenth place classifications respectively. He continued in the Italian series for the next four years and won the privateer's class title in 1996 and 1999. He spent the 2000 and 2001 seasons driving an Audi A4 in the European Super Touring Cup, in which he was a race winner on seven occasions. His 2001 programme was dovetailed with a title-winning participation in the Swedish Touring Car Championship and he successfully defended this title in 2002.

Colciago has spent the last few years switching between Italian and European championships. In 2003, he competed in the European Touring Car Championship, but returned to Italy in 2004, this time in the Touring Master Cup, in which he won two races and finished second in the standings. In 2005, he was back in the ETCC in its new form as the World Touring Car Championship, driving a Honda Accord for independent entrant JAS Motorsport. In 2006, he made another return to Italy for a title-winning season in the Italian Touring Car Championship driving a SEAT. In 2007, he was promoted to compete in the World Championship with SEAT Sport Italia. The season was not positive due to many accidents that have compromised his performance during the season. In 2008, he decided to move into the new italian Series CITE (Campionato Italiano Turismo Endurance) driving always for the official team Seat Sport Italia the Seat Leon TSI FR where he finished second in the final standing. Colciago continued in the CITE 2009 where he finally win the championship and in 2010 where he finished fourth.

== Racing record ==
=== Complete Italian Touring Car Championship results ===
(key) (Races in bold indicate pole position) (Races in italics indicate fastest lap)

Year	Team	Car	1	2	3	4	5	6	7	8	9	10	11	12	13	14	15	16	17	18	19	20	DC	Pts
1995	RC Motorsport	Opel Vectra	MIS; 1; 6	MIS; 2 Ret	BIN; 1; 7	BIN; 2 Ret	MNZ; 1; 2	MNZ; 2; 1	IMO; 1; 8	IMO; 2; 7	MAG; 1; 10	MAG; 2; 11	MUG; 1 Ret	MUG; 2 DNS	MIS; 1; 8	MIS; 2; 10	PER; 1 Ret	PER; 2 DNS	VAR; 1 Ret	VAR; 2 Ret	VAL; 1; 8	VAL; 2 Ret	8th	61
1996	EC Motorsport	Alfa Romeo 155 TS	MUG; 1; 6	MUG; 2; 6	MAG; 1; 6	MAG; 2; 5	MNZ; 1; 5	MNZ; 2; 5	BIN; 1 Ret	BIN; 2; 5	MIS; 1; 6	MIS; 2; 5	IMO; 1; 15	IMO; 2; 6	PER; 1	PER; 2	PER; 1	PER; 2	VAR; 1; 11	VAR; 2 Ret	VAL; 1; 11	VAL; 2; 11	6th	64
1997	EC Motorsport	Honda Accord	MNZ; 1 Ret	MNZ; 2; 2	MUG; 1; 2	MUG; 2 Ret	MAG; 1; 3	MAG; 2; 12	IMO; 1; 5	IMO; 2; 5	IMO; 1 Ret	IMO; 2; 6	BIN; 1 Ret	BIN; 2; 5	PER; 1; 3	PER; 2; 4	VAR; 1	VAR; 2	MIS; 1; 5	MIS; 2; 4	VAL; 1; 4	VAL; 2; 14	7th	122
1998	CiBiEmme Engineering	BMW 320i	BIN; 1	BIN; 2	IMO; 1	IMO; 2	MNZ; 1	MNZ; 2	VAR; 1	VAR; 2	VAL; 1	VAL; 2	MAG; 1	MAG; 2	PER; 1	PER; 2	MIS; 1; 5	MIS; 2; 2	MNZ; 1; 8	MNZ; 2; 7	VAL; 1; 2	VAL; 2; 2	8th	94
1999	AGS Motorsport	Audi A4 Quattro	MIS; 1; 5	MIS; 2; 5	**BIN**; **1**; 2	BIN; 2; 1	IMO; 1; 5	IMO; 2; 4	PER; 1; 5	PER; 2; 4	MAG; 1; 1	**MAG**; **2**; 1	MUG; 1; 4	MUG; 2; 3	MIS; 1; 5	MIS; 2; 5	VAR; 1; 6	VAR; 2; 1	MNZ; 1; 5	MNZ; 2; 5	VAL; 1; 5	VAL; 2; 5	3rd	348
2006	SEAT Sport Italia	SEAT León	MNZ; 1 Ret	MNZ; 2 DNS	MCO; 1; 2	MCO; 2; 1	IMO; 1; 2	IMO; 2; 2	MUG; 1; 4	MUG; 2; 2	**MAG**; **1**; 4	MAG; 2; 2	**VAL**; **1**; 1	**VAL**; **2**; 1	**VAL**; **1**; 1	**VAL**; **2**; 2							1st	98

=== Complete European Touring Car Championship results ===
(key) (Races in bold indicate pole position) (Races in italics indicate fastest lap)

Year	Team	Car	1	2	3	4	5	6	7	8	9	10	11	12	13	14	15	16	17	18	19	20	DC	Pts
2000	AGS Motorsport	Audi A4 Quattro	MUG; 1 Ret	MUG; 2; 7	PER; 1; 6	PER; 2; 4	A1R; 1 Ret	A1R; 2 DNS	MNZ; 1; 1	**MNZ**; **2** Ret	HUN; 1 Ret	HUN; 2 DNS	IMO; 1; 1	**IMO**; **2**; 1	MIS; 1; 6	MIS; 2; 7	BRN; 1; 5	BRN; 2; 1	VAL; 1; 4	VAL; 2; 6	**MOB**; **1**; 1	**MOB**; **2** Ret	6th	154
2001	AGS Motorsport	Audi A4 Quattro	MNZ; 1; 3	MNZ; 2; 3	BRN; 1 Ret	BRN; 2; 9	MAG; 1; 3	MAG; 2; 1	SIL; 1 DNS	SIL; 2 Ret	ZOL; 1; 2	ZOL; 2 Ret	HUN; 1; 3	HUN; 2; 1	A1R; 1; 4	A1R; 2 Ret	NÜR; 1; 6	NÜR; 2; 3	JAR; 1 Ret	JAR; 2; 8	EST; 1; 6	EST; 2; 3	6th	423
2002	GTA Racing Team Nordauto	Alfa Romeo 156 GTA	MAG; 1	MAG; 2	SIL; 1	SIL; 2	BRN; 1	BRN; 2	JAR; 1	JAR; 2	AND; 1	AND; 2	OSC; 1	OSC; 2	SPA; 1	SPA; 2	PER; 1; 15	PER; 2; 2	DON; 1 Ret	DON; 2; 9	EST; 1	EST; 2	12th	6
2003	GTA Racing Team Nordauto	Alfa Romeo 156 GTA	VAL; 1; 9	VAL; 2; 11	MAG; 1; 5	MAG; 2; 5	**PER**; **1**; 1	PER; 2; 2	BRN; 1; 8	BRN; 2; 6	DON; 1; 6	DON; 2; 11	SPA; 1; 8	**SPA**; **2**; 5	AND; 1; 1	AND; 2 Ret	OSC; 1; 5	OSC; 2; 6	EST; 1; 3	EST; 2; 3	MNZ; 1 DSQ	MNZ; 2; 12†	6th	66

† — Did not finish the race, but was classified as he completed over 90% of the race distance.

=== Complete World Touring Car Championship results ===
(key) (Races in bold indicate pole position) (Races in italics indicate fastest lap)

Year	Team	Car	1	2	3	4	5	6	7	8	9	10	11	12	13	14	15	16	17	18	19	20	21	22	DC	Points
2005	JAS Motorsport	Honda Accord Euro R	ITA; 1; 12	ITA; 2 Ret	FRA; 1; 12	FRA; 2; 12	GBR; 1; 12	GBR; 2; 19	SMR; 1; 6	SMR; 2 Ret	MEX; 1 Ret	MEX; 2; 18	BEL; 1; 8	BEL; 2 Ret	GER; 1	GER; 2	TUR; 1	TUR; 2	ESP; 1	ESP; 2	MAC; 1	MAC; 2			19th	4
2006	Scuderia de Girasole	SEAT Toledo Cupra	ITA; 1 Ret	ITA; 2 DNS																					NC	0
2006	Scuderia de Girasole	SEAT León			FRA; 1; 15	FRA; 2; 11	GBR; 1	GBR; 2	GER; 1	GER; 2	BRA; 1	BRA; 2	MEX; 1	MEX; 2	CZE; 1	CZE; 2	TUR; 1	TUR; 2	ESP; 1	ESP; 2	MAC; 1	MAC; 2			NC	0
2007	SEAT Sport Italia	SEAT León	BRA; 1 WD	BRA; 2 WD	NED; 1; 6	NED; 2; 7	ESP; 1 Ret	ESP; 2 Ret	FRA; 1 DNS	FRA; 2 DNS	CZE; 1	CZE; 2	POR; 1 Ret	POR; 2 DNS	SWE; 1; 19	SWE; 2; 18	GER; 1; 8	**GER**; **2**; 14	GBR; 1; 12	GBR; 2; 15	ITA; 1; 22	ITA; 2; 9	MAC; 1	MAC; 2	17th	6

=== Complete TCR International Series results ===
(key) (Races in bold indicate pole position) (Races in italics indicate fastest lap)

Year	Team	Car	1	2	3	4	5	6	7	8	9	10	11	12	13	14	15	16	17	18	19	20	21	22	DC	Points
2016	Target Competition	Honda Civic TCR	BHR; 1	BHR; 2	EST; 1	EST; 2	SPA; 1	SPA; 2	IMO; 1	IMO; 2	SAL; 1	SAL; 2	OSC; 1	OSC; 2	SOC; 1	SOC; 2	CHA; 1	CHA; 2	MRN; 1	MRN; 2	**SEP**; **1**; 1	SEP; 2 Ret	MAC; 1	MAC; 2	14th	30
2017	M1RA	Honda Civic Type R TCR	RIM; 1; 4	RIM; 2; 12	BHR; 1; 1	BHR; 2; 5	SPA; 1; 20	SPA; 2; 13	MNZ; 1; 1	MNZ; 2; 2	SAL; 1; 12	**SAL**; **2**; 1	HUN; 1; 4	HUN; 2; 5	OSC; 1; 14	OSC; 2 Ret	CHA; 1 WD	CHA; 2 WD	ZHE; 1; 7	ZHE; 2; 8	DUB; 1 Ret	DUB; 2 DNS			5th	161

Sporting positions
Preceded by Gianni Morbidelli	Italian Formula Three Champion; 1990	Succeeded by Giambattista Busi
Preceded by Tommy Rustad	Swedish Touring Car Champion; 2001 - 2002	Succeeded by Fredrik Ekblom
Preceded by Alessandro Zanardi	Italian Touring Car Champion; 2006	Succeeded by Cesare Cremonesi
