= 2006 Italian Superturismo Championship =

Seasons
- ← 2005 none →

The 2006 Campionato Italiano Superturismo Season was the second season of the Italian Superturismo Championship since its recreation in 2005 (at the same time as the ETCC, the promoted Italian championship, was turned into the WTCC). It had several well-known contenders, such as Alessandro Zanardi, Emanuele Naspetti and retired ski-racer Kristian Ghedina. Overall a total of seven race weekends of two races each were held at six different circuits. The championship was won by Roberto Colcigao driving for SEAT.

== Teams and drivers ==
Team	Car	No.	Driver	Rounds
BMW Team Italy-Spain	BMW 320si	4	(Italy) Alessandro Zanardi	1-4
(Czech Republic) Československý Motorsport	Alfa Romeo 156 GTA	44	(Czech Republic) Jiří Janák	1
Peugeot Sport Denmark	Peugeot 407	46	(Sweden) Jens Edman	1
(Italy) DB Motorsport	Alfa Romeo 156	51	(Italy) Alessandro Balzan	1-6
(Italy) DB Motorsport	Alfa Romeo 156	52	(Italy) Elio Marchetti	1-4, 7
(Italy) DB Motorsport	Alfa Romeo 156	66	(Italy) Andrea Pagliai	7
(Italy) Scuderia La Torre	Alfa Romeo 156 GTA	53	(Italy) Riccardo Romagnoli	All
(Italy) GDL Racing	BMW 320i	54	(Italy) Emanuele Naspetti	All
(San Marino) Zerocinque Motorsport	BMW 320i	55	(San Marino) Stefano Valli	1-3, 7
(San Marino) Zerocinque Motorsport	BMW 320i	56	(Italy) Simone Iacone	1-4
(San Marino) Zerocinque Motorsport	BMW 320i	56	(Italy) Mirko Venturi	5
(San Marino) Zerocinque Motorsport	BMW 320i	59	(Italy) Kristian Ghedina	4-7
(San Marino) Zerocinque Motorsport	BMW 320i	62	(Italy) Roberto Tamagnini	7
(Italy) SEAT Sport Italia	SEAT León	57	(Italy) Davide Roda	All
(Italy) SEAT Sport Italia	SEAT Toledo Cupra	58	(Italy) Roberto Colciago	1
(Italy) SEAT Sport Italia	SEAT León	58	(Italy) Roberto Colciago	2-7
(Italy) SEAT Sport Italia	SEAT Toledo Cupra	63	(Italy) Gianni Calabrese	5
(Italy) SEAT Sport Italia	SEAT Toledo Cupra	69	(Italy) Massimiliano Pedalà	7
(Italy) Proteam Motorsport	BMW 320i	61	(Italy) Cristian Ricciarini	4-5, 7
(Italy) Pro Motorsport	BMW 320i	65	(Italy) Roberto Conte	7
(Italy) Team Cantarelli	BMW 320i	71	(Italy) Cesare Cremonesi	7

== Race calendar and results ==
Round		Circuit	Date	Pole position	Fastest lap	Winning driver	Winning team
1	R1	(Italy) Monza	2 April	(Italy) Alessandro Zanardi	(Italy) Alessandro Zanardi	(Italy) Alessandro Zanardi	BMW Team Italy-Spain
1	R2	(Italy) Monza	2 April		(Italy) Alessandro Balzan	(Italy) Alessandro Balzan	(Italy) DB Motorsport
2	R1	(France) Circuit de Nevers Magny-Cours	30 April	(Italy) Alessandro Zanardi	(Italy) Alessandro Zanardi	(Italy) Alessandro Zanardi	BMW Team Italy-Spain
2	R2	(France) Circuit de Nevers Magny-Cours	30 April		(Italy) Roberto Colciago	(Italy) Roberto Colciago	(Italy) Seat Sport Italia
3	R1	(Italy) Imola	7 May	(Italy) Alessandro Zanardi	(Italy) Emanuele Naspetti	(Italy) Emanuele Naspetti	(Italy) GDL Racing
3	R2	(Italy) Imola	7 May		(Italy) Elio Marchetti	(Italy) Emanuele Naspetti	(Italy) GDL Racing
4	R1	(Italy) Mugello	23 July	(Italy) Alessandro Zanardi	(Italy) Emanuele Naspetti	(Italy) Alessandro Zanardi	BMW Team Italy-Spain
4	R2	(Italy) Mugello	23 July		(Italy) Alessandro Zanardi	(Italy) Alessandro Zanardi	BMW Team Italy-Spain
5	R1	(Italy) Magione	17 September	(Italy) Roberto Colciago	(Italy) Roberto Colciago	(Italy) Emanuele Naspetti	(Italy) GDL Racing
5	R2	(Italy) Magione	17 September		(Italy) Emanuele Naspetti	(Italy) Emanuele Naspetti	(Italy) GDL Racing
6	R1	(Italy) Vallelunga	1 October	(Italy) Roberto Colciago	(Italy) Roberto Colciago	(Italy) Roberto Colciago	(Italy) Seat Sport Italia
6	R2	(Italy) Vallelunga	1 October		(Italy) Roberto Colciago	(Italy) Roberto Colciago	(Italy) Seat Sport Italia
7	R1	(Italy) Vallelunga	15 October	(Italy) Roberto Colciago	(Italy) Roberto Colciago	(Italy) Roberto Colciago	(Italy) Seat Sport Italia
7	R2	(Italy) Vallelunga	15 October		(Italy) Roberto Colciago	(Italy) Emanuele Naspetti	(Italy) GDL Racing

== Championship standings ==
Points system
**1st**	**2nd**	**3rd**	**4th**	**5th**	**6th**	**7th**	**8th**
10	8	6	5	4	3	2	1

- 12 results from 14 are valid for the championship

=== Drivers' Championship ===
Pos	Driver	Car	MON (Italy)		MCO (France)		IMO (Italy)		MUG (Italy)		MAG (Italy)		VAL (Italy)		VAL (Italy)		Pts
1	(Italy) Roberto Colciago	Seat	Ret	DNS	2	1	2	2	4	2	**4**	2	**1**	**1**	**1**	**2**	98
2	(Italy) Emanuele Naspetti	BMW	8	DNS	3	Ret	1	**1**	3	8	1	**1**	2	4	2	1	85
3	(Italy) Alessandro Balzan	Alfa Romeo	2	1	Ret	2	3	3	6	9	2	Ret	3	2			63
4	(Italy) Riccardo Romagnoli	Alfa Romeo	4	3	6	3	4	7	7	4	Ret	3	5	Ret	6	5	51
5	(Italy) Alessandro Zanardi	BMW	**1**	**7**	**1**	**Ret**	**Ret**	5	**1**	**1**							46
6	(Italy) Simone Iacone	BMW	3	2	5	DNS	Ret	6	2	3							35
7	(Italy) Kristian Ghedina	BMW							8	5	6	5	4	3	5	4	32
8	(Italy) Davide Roda	Seat	6	6	7	4	5	Ret	9	7	Ret	Ret	6	Ret	Ret	6	25
9	(Italy) Elio Marchetti	Alfa Romeo	Ret	DNS	4	Ret	6	4	10	6					10	9	16
10	(Italy) Cristian Ricciarini	BMW							5	Ret	Ret	4			4	Ret	14
11	(Italy) Massimiliano Pedalà	Seat													3	3	12
12	(San Marino) Stefano Valli	BMW	7	4	Ret	DNS	7	Ret									11
13	(Czech Republic) Jiří Janák	Alfa Romeo	5	5													8
14	(Italy) Gianni Calabrese	Seat									5	6					7
15	(Italy) Mirko Venturi	BMW									3	Ret					6
16	(Italy) Andrea Pagliai	Alfa Romeo													7	7	4
	(Italy) Roberto Tamagnini	BMW													9	10	0
	(Italy) Roberto Conte	BMW													11	11	0
	(Italy) Cesare Cremonesi	BMW													Ret	Ret	0
	(Sweden) Jens Edman	Peugeot	Ret	DNS													0
Pos	Driver	Car	MON (Italy)		MCO (France)		IMO (Italy)		MUG (Italy)		MAG (Italy)		VAL (Italy)		VAL (Italy)		Pts

Colour	Result
Gold	Winner
Silver	Second place
Bronze	Third place
Green	Points classification
Blue	Non-points classification
Blue	Non-classified finish (NC)
Purple	Retired, not classified (Ret)
Red	Did not qualify (DNQ)
Red	Did not pre-qualify (DNPQ)
Black	Disqualified (DSQ)
White	Did not start (DNS)
White	Withdrew (WD)
White	Race cancelled (C)
Blank	Did not practice (DNP)
Blank	Did not arrive (DNA)
Blank	Excluded (EX)

**Bold** – Pole
Italics – Fastest Lap

=== Constructors' Championship ===
Pos	Manufacturer	Points
1	(Germany) BMW	188
2	(Spain) SEAT	139
3	(Italy) Alfa Romeo	129
