= 2002 Swedish Touring Car Championship =

Seasons
- ← 2001 2003 →

The 2002 Swedish Touring Car Championship season was the 7th Swedish Touring Car Championship (STCC) season. >Nine racing weekends at four different circuits were held in total; each round comprising two races, with the exception of Round 4 at Falkenberg (4 races), making an eighteen-round competition in total. It was the last year with the Supertouring regulations, as 2003 saw the introduction of S2000 rules. STCC was one of the last national series to give up these set of rules. Roberto Colciago won his second consecutive title driving an Audi.

== Teams and drivers ==
Team	Car	No.	Drivers
Kristoffersson Motorsport	Audi A4 Quattro	1	(Italy) Roberto Colciago
Kristoffersson Motorsport	Audi A4 Quattro	4	(Sweden) Tommy Kristoffersson
Kristoffersson Motorsport	Audi A4 Quattro	11	(Norway) Marius Erlandsen
Flash Engineering	Volvo S40	2	(Sweden) Jan Nilsson
Flash Engineering	Volvo S40	3	(Sweden) Edward Sandström
Opel Team Sweden	Opel Vectra	5	(Sweden) Mattias Andersson
Picko Troberg Racing	Vauxhall Vectra	7	(Sweden) Jan Lindblom
Picko Troberg Racing	Vauxhall Vectra	9	(Sweden) Nicklas Karlsson
Toshiba Racing	Audi A4 Quattro	8	(Sweden) Tobias Johansson
Toshiba Racing	Audi A4 Quattro	12	(Sweden) Anders Hammer
Krokström Motorsport	Volvo S40	10	(Sweden) Magnus Krokström
Engström Motorsport	Honda Accord	17	(Sweden) Tomas Engström
Tysslinge Racing	Audi A4 Quattro	22	(Sweden) Tobias Tegelby

== Race calendar and winners ==
All rounds were held in Sweden.

Round	Circuit	Date	Winning driver	Winning team
1 2	Mantorp Park	12 May	Roberto Colciago; Edward Sandström	Kristoffersson Motorsport; Flash Engineering
3 4	Ring Knutstorp	26 May	Roberto Colciago; Edward Sandström	Kristoffersson Motorsport; Flash Engineering
5 6	Karlskoga Motorstadion	9 June	Tomas Engström; Nicklas Karlsson	Engström Motorsport; Picko Troberg Racing
7 8	Falkenbergs Motorbana	6 July	Jan Nilsson; Edward Sandström	Flash Engineering; Flash Engineering
9 10	Falkenbergs Motorbana	7 July	Jan Nilsson; Jan Lindblom	Flash Engineering; Picko Troberg Racing
11 12	Ring Knutstorp	21 July	Roberto Colciago; Tommy Kristoffersson	Kristoffersson Motorsport; Kristoffersson Motorsport
13 14	Karlskoga Motorstadion	18 August	Tomas Engström; Roberto Colciago	Engström Motorsport; Kristoffersson Motorsport
15 16	Falkenbergs Motorbana	1 September	Jan Nilsson; Nicklas Karlsson	Flash Engineering; Picko Troberg Racing
17 18	Mantorp Park	15 September	Roberto Colciago; Edward Sandström	Kristoffersson Motorsport; Flash Engineering

== Championship results ==
=== Championship standings ===
Pos.	Driver	MAN		KNU		GEL		FAL				KNU		GEL		FAL		MAN		Pts
1	(Italy) Roberto Colciago	1	2	1	6	2	Ret	8	2	Ret	2	1	2	9	1	6	Ret	1	3	175
2	(Sweden) Jan Nilsson	2	4	3	4	5	2	1	6	1	5	12	Ret	3	8	1	2	3	4	162
3	(Sweden) Nicklas Karlsson	7	10	2	2	3	1	2	11	3	Ret	4	5	6	Ret	2	1	Ret	2	148
4	(Sweden) Edward Sandström	Ret	1	Ret	1	8	3	4	1	6	3	7	5	11	3	Ret	5	4	1	147
5	(Sweden) Tomas Engström	3	3	8	10	1	Ret	3	Ret	2	6	2	3	1	2	3	4	5	Ret	145
6	(Sweden) Tommy Kristoffersson	4	5	4	Ret	4	9	6	4	7	DNS	3	1	4	Ret	7	Ret	2	7	108
7	(Sweden) Jan Lindblom	6	7	5	5	7	4	5	8	5	1	8	7	7	7	4	3	Ret	DNS	96
8	(Sweden) Tobias Johansson	5	6	Ret	9	6	5	9	5	8	8	5	6	2	6	Ret	9	Ret	5	80
9	(Sweden) Mattias Andersson	8	Ret	9	3	9	Ret	11	3	4	4	6	8	5	4	Ret	7	7	8	79
10	(Norway) Marius Erlandsen	11	9	7	7	Ret	7	Ret	DNS	10	7	10	Ret	10	5	8	8	6	6	48
11	(Sweden) Magnus Krokström	9	8	Ret	Ret	11	6	7	Ret	9	Ret	9	Ret	8	Ret	5	6	8	Ret	35
12	(Sweden) Anders Hammer	10	Ret	6	8	10	8	10	7	11	9	11	12					Ret	9	24
13	(Sweden) Tobias Tegelby																	9	10	4

=== Driver's championship ===
Position	Driver	Points
1	Roberto Colciago	175
2	Jan Nilsson	162
3	Nicklas Karlsson	148
4	Edward Sandström	147
5	Tomas Engström	146
6	Tommy Kristoffersson	108
7	Jan Lindblom	96
8	Tobias Johansson	80
9	Mattias Andersson	79
10	Marius Erlandsen	48
11	Magnus Krokström	35
12	Anders Hammer	24
13	Tobias Tegelby	4

=== Independent's championship ===
Position	Driver	Points
1	Tobias Johansson	233
2	Magnus Krokström	142
3	Anders Hammer	140
4	Tobias Tegelby	32

=== Manufacturer's championship ===
Position	Manufacturer	Points
1	Volvo	233
2	Audi	213
3	Honda	170
4	Opel	136
