= 2001 Swedish Touring Car Championship =

Seasons
- ← 2000 2002 →

The 2001 Swedish Touring Car Championship season was the 6th Swedish Touring Car Championship (STCC) season. In total, ten racing weekends at six different circuits were held; each round comprising two races, making up a twenty-round competition in total.

== Teams and drivers ==
S = Synsam Cup (Privateer Cup)

Team	Car	No.	Drivers	Class	Rounds
Crawford Nissan Racing	Nissan Primera	1	(Sweden) Carl Rosenblad		All
Crawford Nissan Racing	Nissan Primera	7	(Sweden) Tomas Nyström		All
Kristoffersson Motorsport	Audi A4 Quattro	2	(Italy) Roberto Colciago		1, 3-10
Kristoffersson Motorsport	Audi A4 Quattro	8	(Sweden) Tommy Kristoffersson		All
Kristoffersson Motorsport	Audi A4 Quattro	28	(Sweden) Thed Björk		2
Flash Engineering	Volvo S40	3	(Sweden) Jan Nilsson		All
Flash Engineering	Volvo S40	4	(Sweden) Jens Edman		All
Flash Engineering	Volvo S40	40	(Sweden) Rickard Rydell		10
Agrol Swecon WorldCom Racing	Volvo S40	10	(Sweden) Jan Lindblom		All
Svenska Honda Bilimport AB	Honda Accord	11	(Sweden) Hubert Bergh		1-3, 5-6, 8-10
Opel Team Sweden	Opel Vectra	12	(Sweden) Pontus Mörth		All
Krokström Motorsport	Audi A4 Quattro	13	(Sweden) Magnus Krokström	S	All
NK Motorsport Sweden	Alfa Romeo 156	14	(Sweden) Nicklas Karlsson		All
Toshiba Racing	Audi A4 Quattro	15	(Sweden) Anders Hammer	S	All
Sundberg Motorsport	Volvo S40	16	(Sweden) Fredrik Sundberg	S	1-3, 6, 9-10
DC Motorsport	Chrysler Stratus	17	(Sweden) Tomas Engström	S	All
Euroracing	Alfa Romeo 156	18	(Sweden) Marcus Gustavsson		1-3, 5-6
Euroracing	Alfa Romeo 155	19	(Sweden) Djon Clausen	S	1-6, 8-10
Euroracing	Alfa Romeo 156	23	(Sweden) Kari Mäkinen		9-10
Euroracing	Alfa Romeo 156	28	(Sweden) Thed Björk		8
Brovallen Motorsport	BMW 320i	20	(Sweden) Peter Hallén	S	All
Brovallen Motorsport	Audi A4 Quattro	26	(Sweden) Tobias Johansson	S	All
BRS Motorsport	Volvo S40	21	(Sweden) Andreas Boström	S	5, 10
Roos Racing	Volvo S40	22	(Sweden) Håkan Roos		9
Podium Racing	Audi A4 Quattro	25	(Sweden) Lennart Pehrson	S	All
Öhman Fondkommision / Picko Troberg Racing	Vauxhall Vectra	27	(Sweden) Mattias Andersson		All
Öhman Fondkommision / Picko Troberg Racing	Vauxhall Vectra	36	(Sweden) Nicklas Lovén		All
NIKA Racing	Alfa Romeo 156	29	(Sweden) Peter Sundfeldt		1
Bohlin Racing	Ford Mondeo	30	(Sweden) Lennart Bohlin		8, 10
Bohlin Racing	Ford Mondeo	31	(Sweden) Jimmy Bohlin		2-3
Masken Racing	Audi A4 Quattro	32	(Sweden) Svarta Masken		10

== Race calendar and winners ==
Round	Circuit	Date	Winning driver	Winning team
1 2	(Sweden) Falkenbergs Motorbana	6 May	Jens Edman; Jens Edman	Flash Engineering; Flash Engineering
3 4	(Sweden) Mantorp Park	20 May	Carl Rosenblad; Pontus Mörth	Crawford Nissan Racing; Opel Team Sweden
5 6	(Sweden) Karlskoga Motorstadion	4 June	Tomas Nyström; Carl Rosenblad	Crawford Nissan Racing; Crawford Nissan Racing
7 8	(Denmark) Jyllandsringen	10 June	Roberto Colciago; Roberto Colciago	Kristoffersson Motorsport; Kristoffersson Motorsport
9 10	(Sweden) Falkenbergs Motorbana	8 July	Jan Nilsson; Tommy Kristoffersson	Flash Engineering; Kristoffersson Motorsport
11 12	(Sweden) Ring Knutstorp	22 July	Roberto Colciago; Roberto Colciago	Kristoffersson Motorsport; Kristoffersson Motorsport
13 14	(Norway) Arctic Circle Raceway	5 August	Jens Edman; Carl Rosenblad	Flash Engineering; Crawford Nissan Racing
15 16	(Sweden) Karlskoga Motorstadion	19 August	Roberto Colciago; Jan Nilsson	Kristoffersson Motorsport; Flash Engineering
17 18	(Sweden) Ring Knutstorp	2 September	Tobias Johansson; Roberto Colciago	Brovallen Motorsport; Kristoffersson Motorsport
19 20	(Sweden) Mantorp Park	16 September	Carl Rosenblad; Roberto Colciago	Crawford Nissan Racing; Kristoffersson Motorsport

== Championship results ==
Pos.	Driver	FAL (Sweden)		MAN (Sweden)		KAR (Sweden)		JYL (Denmark)		FAL (Sweden)		KNU (Sweden)		MOI (Norway)		KAR (Sweden)		KNU (Sweden)		MAN (Sweden)		Pts
1	(Italy) Roberto Colciago	4	Ret			22	3	1	1	4	Ret	1	1	12	3	1	2	2	1	4	1	192
2	(Sweden) Jan Nilsson	2	Ret	4	4	Ret	Ret	3	4	1	2	5	6	Ret	5	4	1	Ret	4	3	2	157
3	(Sweden) Jens Edman	1	1	5	Ret	16	13	2	3	2	4	4	3	1	Ret	3	6	3	DNS	2	16	154
4	(Sweden) Tommy Kristoffersson	9	6	2	9	2	4	Ret	5	5	1	2	2	3	6	2	3	Ret	Ret	5	4	151
5	(Sweden) Carl Rosenblad	7	4	1	3	4	1	10	8	3	20	7	4	2	1	DNS	8	Ret	8	1	Ret	139
6	(Sweden) Pontus Mörth	5	2	Ret	1	3	5	6	10	Ret	DNS	10	5	4	2	5	5	Ret	6	7	7	111
7	(Sweden) Mattias Andersson	6	3	6	6	5	4	2	7	3	9	11	Ret	9	Ret	4	Ret	22	9	5	8	94
8	(Sweden) Tobias Johansson	10	7	7	7	17	7	12	6	9	8	3	7	8	7	DNS	12	1	3	6	9	83
9	(Sweden) Thomas Nyström	3	Ret	3	5	1	2	5	9	Ret	12	18	10	Ret	12	Ret	Ret	5	Ret	11	11	68
10	(Sweden) Magnus Krokström	11	9	9	11	9	12	11	15	14	Ret	8	8	5	13	Ret	10	4	2	8	8	49
11	(Sweden) Niklas Lovén	Ret	5	Ret	Ret	Ret	Ret	16	Ret	6	5	Ret	13	Ret	4	9	9	13	DNS	Ret	6	39
12	(Sweden) Hubert Bergh	12	11	12	Ret	6	6			10	7	6	9			7	7	6	Ret	13	10	37
13	(Sweden) Jan Lindblom	Ret	DNS	8	Ret	11	10	7	7	24	Ret	19	15	7	10	DNS	Ret	7	5	Ret	14	28
14	(Sweden) Tomas Engström	8	Ret	Ret	8	15	11	15	14	11	6	15	14	6	8	10	13	8	Ret	Ret	17	23
15	(Sweden) Rickard Rydell																			16	3	20
16	(Sweden) Nicklas Karlsson	22	22	11	10	8	9	14	12	8	DNS	13	Ret	9	Ret	6	Ret	Ret	Ret	Ret	15	17
17	(Sweden) Peter Hallén	Ret	8	10	14	8	16	9	11	12	10	12	16	DNS	DNS	8	11	Ret	DNS	14	13	13
18	(Sweden) Thed Björk			Ret	2											Ret	15					12
19	(Sweden) Lennart Pehrsson	Ret	10	13	Ret	10	Ret	8	16	13	11	Ret	Ret	11	11	Ret	Ret	11	7	12	12	9
20	(Sweden) Anders Hammer	14	13	14	Ret	14	Ret	13	13	Ret	13	11	12	10	Ret	11	14	Ret	9	10	Ret	4
21	(Sweden) Fredrik Sundberg	21	12	15	12	18	14					14	17					9	Ret	15	DNS	2
22	(Sweden) Marcus Gustavsson	Ret	Ret	Ret	DNS	12	Ret			16	9	16	Ret									2
23	(Sweden) Djon Clausen	DNS	DNS	DNS	DNS	Ret	15	DNS	17	17	DNS	17	Ret			DNS	DNS	10	Ret	19	19	1
24	(Sweden) Lennart Bohlin															12	16			Ret	DNS	
25	(Sweden) Kari Mäkinen																	12	Ret	17	18	
26	(Sweden) Jimmy Bohlin			Ret	13	13	Ret															
27	(Sweden) Peter Sundfeldt	13	Ret																			
28	(Sweden) Andreas Boström									15	DNS									18	20	
29	(Sweden) Håkan Roos																	Ret	DNS			
30	(Sweden) Svarta Masken																			Ret	Ret	

=== Independent's championship ===
Position	Driver	Points
1	Tobias Johansson	262
2	Magnus Krokström	217
3	Tomas Engström	157
4	Peter Hallén	151
5	Anders Hammer	103
6	Lennart Pehrson	103
7	Fredrik Sundberg	51
8	Andreas Boström	22
9	Djon Clausen	19

=== Manufacturer's championship ===
Position	Manufacturer	Points
1	Audi	266
2	Volvo	241
3	Nissan	217
4	Opel	143
5	Honda	120
