= 1999 Italian Superturismo Championship =

Seasons
- ← 1998 2005 →

The 1999 Italian Superturismo Championship season was the thirteenth and last edition of the Italian Superturismo Championship. The season began in Misano on 17 April and finished in Vallelunga on 10 October, after ten rounds.

== Season summary ==
With the withdrawal of Audi the fight for the victory was between only 2 Manufactures (Alfa Romeo and BMW) and only 4 official drivers. Due to the lot of problems had the previous year and the poor tv coverage just 6 private drivers confirmed their participation into the series. The consequence was that the grid was made just by 10 cars.

Once again the driver's championship was between Fabrizio Giovanardi and Emanuele Naspetti. In the beginning of the season Naspetti and BMW were able to score 5 victories on 6 races. Giovanardi and Alfa were finally able to get a double victory only in the fourth round in Pergusa. During the rest of the season Naspetti and Giovanardi switched each other on the top of the standing and arrived to the final round separated by just 1 point.

In the final round Giovanardi was able to win the race and the championship as well, on the wheel of Alfa Romeo 156; the Italian manufacturer won the constructors' championship, while Roberto Colciago took the privateers' trophy.

The last year of Superturismo was also remembered because it was the first time that a private driver (Roberto Colciago) won 4 races against the official drivers. Colciago although a private Audi A4 Quattro was able to win in the slow tracks and thanks to his consistency taking points in all 20 races he arrived in the last round with still the theorical possibility to win the italian title.

With the end of Italian Superturismo and on the same time the end of STW, the Teams (Nordauto, Cibiemme, AGS, Christy's Team, Soli Racing and Nath Racing) together with some privates team of German Supertouring (STW) decided to create the European Super Touring Cup.

== Teams and drivers ==
Team	Car	No.	Drivers	Rounds	Class
(Italy) Nordauto Engineering	Alfa Romeo 156	1	(Italy) Fabrizio Giovanardi	All	
(Italy) Nordauto Engineering	Alfa Romeo 156	2	(Italy) Nicola Larini	All	
(Italy) CiBiEmme Engineering	BMW 320i	3	(Italy) Emanuele Naspetti	All	
(Italy) CiBiEmme Engineering	BMW 320i	4	(Italy) Fabrizio de Simone	All	
(Italy) Scuderia del Portello	Alfa Romeo 156	21	(Italy) Fabian Peroni	All	P
(Italy) AGS Motorsport	Audi A4 Quattro	22	(Italy) Roberto Colciago	All	P
(Italy) Soli Racing Team	Alfa Romeo 155 TS	23	(Italy) Moreno Soli	All	P
(Italy) Varese Corse	Audi A4 Quattro	24	(Italy) Davide Bernasconi	All	P
(Italy) Christy's Team	BMW 320i	25	(Italy) Massimo Pigoli	1-3, 8-10	P
(Italy) Nath Racing	Audi A4 Quattro	26	(Italy) Guido Lucchetti Cigarini	All	P
(Italy) Christy's Team	BMW 320i	27	(Italy) Stefano Gabellini	4-7	P
(Italy) Lanza Motorsport	Alfa Romeo 155 TS	28	(Italy) Mauro Simoncini	9	P

Icon	Class
P	Private Drivers

=== Drivers changes ===
Changed Cars

- Roberto Colciago: BMW 320i → Audi A4 Quattro
- Fabian Peroni: Audi A4 Quattro → Alfa Romeo 156
- Massimo Pigoli: Honda Accord → BMW 320i
- Moreno Soli: Audi A4 Quattro → Alfa Romeo 155
- Guido Lucchetti Cigarini: Opel Vectra Gt → Audi A4 Quattro

Entering Superturismo 1999

- Mauro Simoncini: FIA GT Championship - GT2 class → Alfa Romeo 155
- Stefano Gabellini: No full-time drive → BMW 320i

Leaving Superturismo 1999

- Rinaldo Capello
- Antonio Tamburini
- Gianluca Roda
- Sandro Sardelli
- Miguel Ramos
- Emanuele Moncini

== Race calendar and results ==
Round		Circuit	Date	Pole position	Fastest lap	Winning driver	Winning team
1	R1	(Italy) Misano Adriatico	17 April	(Italy) Nicola Larini	(Italy) Nicola Larini	(Italy) Fabrizio de Simone	(Italy) CiBiEmme Engineering
1	R2	(Italy) Misano Adriatico	18 April		(Italy) Fabrizio de Simone	(Italy) Fabrizio de Simone	(Italy) CiBiEmme Engineering
2	R1	(Italy) Binetto	8 May	(Italy) Roberto Colciago	(Italy) Fabrizio de Simone	(Italy) Emanuele Naspetti	(Italy) CiBiEmme Engineering
2	R2	(Italy) Binetto	9 May		(Italy) Fabrizio Giovanardi	(Italy) Roberto Colciago	(Italy) AGS Motorsport
3	R1	(Italy) Imola	22 May	(Italy) Fabrizio Giovanardi	(Italy) Emanuele Naspetti	(Italy) Emanuele Naspetti	(Italy) CiBiEmme Engineering
3	R2	(Italy) Imola	23 May		(Italy) Emanuele Naspetti	(Italy) Emanuele Naspetti	(Italy) CiBiEmme Engineering
4	R1	(Italy) Pergusa	5 June	(Italy) Fabrizio Giovanardi	(Italy) Emanuele Naspetti	(Italy) Fabrizio Giovanardi	(Italy) Nordauto Engineering
4	R2	(Italy) Pergusa	6 June		(Italy) Fabrizio Giovanardi	(Italy) Fabrizio Giovanardi	(Italy) Nordauto Engineering
5	R1	(Italy) Magione	19 June	(Italy) Roberto Colciago	(Italy) Roberto Colciago	(Italy) Roberto Colciago	(Italy) AGS Motorsport
5	R2	(Italy) Magione	20 June		(Italy) Roberto Colciago	(Italy) Roberto Colciago	(Italy) AGS Motorsport
6	R1	(Italy) Mugello	10 July	(Italy) Fabrizio Giovanardi	(Italy) Fabrizio Giovanardi	(Italy) Fabrizio Giovanardi	(Italy) Nordauto Engineering
6	R2	(Italy) Mugello	11 July		(Italy) Nicola Larini	(Italy) Fabrizio Giovanardi	(Italy) Nordauto Engineering
7	R1	(Italy) Misano Adriatico	30 July	(Italy) Fabrizio Giovanardi	(Italy) Nicola Larini	(Italy) Nicola Larini	(Italy) Nordauto Engineering
7	R2	(Italy) Misano Adriatico	1 August		(Italy) Emanuele Naspetti	(Italy) Emanuele Naspetti	(Italy) CiBiEmme Engineering
8	R1	(Italy) Varano De Melegari	4 September	(Italy) Fabrizio Giovanardi	(Italy) Roberto Colciago	(Italy) Nicola Larini	(Italy) Nordauto Engineering
8	R2	(Italy) Varano De Melegari	5 September		(Italy) Fabrizio Giovanardi	(Italy) Roberto Colciago	(Italy) AGS Motorsport
9	R1	(Italy) Monza	25 September	(Italy) Fabrizio Giovanardi	(Italy) Fabrizio Giovanardi	(Italy) Fabrizio Giovanardi	(Italy) Nordauto Engineering
9	R2	(Italy) Monza	26 September		(Italy) Fabian Peroni	(Italy) Fabrizio Giovanardi	(Italy) Nordauto Engineering
10	R1	(Italy) Vallelunga	9 October	(Italy) Fabrizio Giovanardi	(Italy) Nicola Larini	(Italy) Nicola Larini	(Italy) Nordauto Engineering
10	R2	(Italy) Vallelunga	10 October		(Italy) Fabrizio Giovanardi	(Italy) Fabrizio Giovanardi	(Italy) Nordauto Engineering

== Round 1 (Italy) Misano Adriatico ==
Qualifying

Pos	No	Driver	Car	Lap Time	Points
1	2	(Italy) Nicola Larini	Alfa Romeo 156	1.33.911	1
2	4	(Italy) Fabrizio De Simone	BMW 320i	1.34.069	
3	1	(Italy) Fabrizio Giovanardi	Alfa Romeo 156	1.34.073	
4	3	(Italy) Emanuele Naspetti	BMW 320i	1.34.343	
5	22	(Italy) Roberto Colciago	Audi A4 Quattro	1.35.326	
6	21	(Italy) Fabian Peroni	Alfa Romeo 156	1.35.735	
7	25	(Italy) Massimo Pigoli	BMW 320i	1.37.020	
8	24	(Italy) Davide Bernasconi	Audi A4 Quattro	1.38.225	
9	26	(Italy) Guido Lucchetti Cigarini	Audi A4 Quattro	1.40.627	
10	23	(Italy) Moreno Soli	Alfa Romeo 155	1.41.779	

Race 1

Pos	No	Driver	Constructor	Time/Retired	Points
1	4	(Italy) Fabrizio De Simone	BMW 320i	11 laps in 17:29.984	20
2	3	(Italy) Emanuele Naspetti	BMW 320i	+7.560s	15
3	2	(Italy) Nicola Larini	Alfa Romeo 156	+8.353s	12
4	1	(Italy) Fabrizio Giovanardi	Alfa Romeo 156	+16.298s	10
5	22	(Italy) Roberto Colciago	Audi A4 Quattro	+16.818s	8
6	21	(Italy) Fabian Peroni	Alfa Romeo 156	+29.057s	6
7	24	(Italy) Davide Bernasconi	Audi A4 Quattro	+1.05.863s	4
8	23	(Italy) Moreno Soli	Alfa Romeo 155	+1.38.557s	3
9	25	(Italy) Massimo Pigoli	BMW 320i	+1 lap	2
DNF	26	(Italy) Guido Lucchetti Cigarini	Audi A4 Quattro	+8 laps	

Race 2

Pos	No	Driver	Constructor	Time/Retired	Points
1	4	(Italy) Fabrizio De Simone	BMW 320i	20 laps in 32:13.048	40
2	1	(Italy) Fabrizio Giovanardi	Alfa Romeo 156	+5.201s	30
3	2	(Italy) Nicola Larini	Alfa Romeo 156	+8.238s	24
4	3	(Italy) Emanuele Naspetti	BMW 320i	+17.640s	20
5	22	(Italy) Roberto Colciago	Audi A4 Quattro	+28.494s	16
6	25	(Italy) Massimo Pigoli	BMW 320i	+1.13.060s	12
7	23	(Italy) Moreno Soli	Alfa Romeo 155	+1 lap	8
8	26	(Italy) Guido Lucchetti Cigarini	Audi A4 Quattro	+1 lap	6
DSQ	21	(Italy) Fabian Peroni	Alfa Romeo 156	+15 laps	
DNF	24	(Italy) Davide Bernasconi	Audi A4 Quattro	+17 laps	

=== Championship standings after Round 1 ===
Drivers' Championship standings

Pos	Driver	Points
1	(Italy) Fabrizio De Simone	60
2	(Italy) Fabrizio Giovanardi	40
3	(Italy) Nicola Larini	37
4	(Italy) Emanuele Naspetti	35
5	(Italy) Roberto Colciago	24

Constructors' Championship standings

Pos	Constructor	Points
1	(Germany) BMW	109
2	(Italy) Alfa Romeo	94
3	(Germany) Audi	34

== Round 2 (Italy) Binetto ==
Qualifying

Pos	No	Driver	Car	Lap Time	Points
1	22	(Italy) Roberto Colciago	Audi A4 Quattro	47.069	1
2	1	(Italy) Fabrizio Giovanardi	Alfa Romeo 156	47.248	
3	3	(Italy) Emanuele Naspetti	BMW 320i	47.270	
4	4	(Italy) Fabrizio De Simone	BMW 320i	47.376	
5	2	(Italy) Nicola Larini	Alfa Romeo 156	47.515	
6	25	(Italy) Massimo Pigoli	BMW 320i	47.642	
7	21	(Italy) Fabian Peroni	Alfa Romeo 156	47.846	
8	24	(Italy) Davide Bernasconi	Audi A4 Quattro	48.925	
9	23	(Italy) Moreno Soli	Alfa Romeo 155	49.446	
10	26	(Italy) Guido Lucchetti Cigarini	Audi A4 Quattro	49.666	

Race 1

Pos	No	Driver	Constructor	Time/Retired	Points
1	3	(Italy) Emanuele Naspetti	BMW 320i	22 laps in 17:48.090	20
2	22	(Italy) Roberto Colciago	Audi A4 Quattro	+0.342s	15
3	1	(Italy) Fabrizio Giovanardi	Alfa Romeo 156	+12.624s	12
4	4	(Italy) Fabrizio De Simone	BMW 320i	+12.971s	10
5	2	(Italy) Nicola Larini	Alfa Romeo 156	+13.364s	8
6	21	(Italy) Fabian Peroni	Alfa Romeo 156	+15.367s	6
7	24	(Italy) Davide Bernasconi	Audi A4 Quattro	+31.224s	4
8	51	(Italy) Massimo Pigoli	BMW 320i	+33.484s	3
9	59	(Italy) Guido Lucchetti Cigarini	Audi A4 Quattro	+47.912s	2
10	52	(Italy) Moreno Soli	Alfa Romeo 155	+1 lap	1

Race 2

Pos	No	Driver	Constructor	Time/Retired	Points
1	22	(Italy) Roberto Colciago	Audi A4 Quattro	44 laps in 35:37.693	40
2	4	(Italy) Fabrizio De Simone	BMW 320i	+15.470s	30
3	3	(Italy) Emanuele Naspetti	BMW 320i	+18.938s	24
4	1	(Italy) Fabrizio Giovanardi	Alfa Romeo 156	+45.197s	20
5	2	(Italy) Nicola Larini	Alfa Romeo 156	+13.526s	16
6	25	(Italy) Massimo Pigoli	BMW 320i	+1 lap	12
7	24	(Italy) Davide Bernasconi	Audi A4 Quattro	+1 lap	8
8	26	(Italy) Guido Lucchetti Cigarini	Audi A4 Quattro	+1 lap	6
9	23	(Italy) Moreno Soli	Alfa Romeo 155	+3 laps	4
DNF	21	(Italy) Fabian Peroni	Alfa Romeo 156	+22 laps	

=== Championship standings after Round 2 ===
Drivers' Championship standings

Pos	Driver	Points
1	(Italy) Fabrizio De Simone	100
2	(Italy) Robertoo Colciago	80
3	(Italy) Emanuele Naspetti	79
4	(Italy) Fabrizio Giovanardi	72
5	(Italy) Nicola Larini	61

Constructors' Championship standings

Pos	Constructor	Points
1	(Germany) BMW	208
2	(Italy) Alfa Romeo	161
3	(Germany) Audi	110

== Round 3 (Italy) Imola ==
Qualifying

Pos	No	Driver	Car	Lap Time	Points
1	1	(Italy) Fabrizio Giovanardi	Alfa Romeo 156	1.55.095	1
2	3	(Italy) Emanuele Naspetti	BMW 320i	1.55.454	
3	2	(Italy) Nicola Larini	Alfa Romeo 156	1.55.482	
4	4	(Italy) Fabrizio De Simone	BMW 320i	1.55.731	
5	22	(Italy) Roberto Colciago	Audi A4 Quattro	1.55.800	
6	54	(Italy) Fabian Peroni	Alfa Romeo 156	1.56.145	
7	25	(Italy) Massimo Pigoli	BMW 320i	1.56.627	
8	24	(Italy) Davide Bernasconi	Audi A4 Quattro	2.00.259	
9	23	(Italy) Moreno Soli	Alfa Romeo 155	2.01.132	
10	26	(Italy) Guido Lucchetti Cigarini	Audi A4 Quattro	2.02.198	

Race 1

Pos	No	Driver	Constructor	Time/Retired	Points
1	3	(Italy) Emanuele Naspetti	BMW 320i	9 laps in 17:34.543	20
2	1	(Italy) Fabrizio Giovanardi	Alfa Romeo 156	+2.883s	15
3	4	(Italy) Fabrizio De Simone	BMW 320i	+3.076s	12
4	2	(Italy) Nicola Larini	Alfa Romeo 156	+6.341s	10
5	22	(Italy) Roberto Colciago	Audi A4 Quattro	+7.681s	8
6	21	(Italy) Fabian Peroni	Alfa Romeo 156	+9.724s	6
7	26	(Italy) Guido Lucchetti Cigarini	Audi A4 Quattro	+51.109s	4
8	23	(Italy) Moreno Soli	Alfa Romeo 155	+51.641s	3
DNF	25	(Italy) Massimo Pigoli	BMW 320i	+2 laps	
DNF	24	(Italy) Davide Bernasconi	Audi A4 Quattro	+5 laps	

Race 2

Pos	No	Driver	Constructor	Time/Retired	Points
1	3	(Italy) Emanuele Naspetti	BMW 320i	16 laps in 31:12.135s	40
2	4	(Italy) Fabrizio De Simone	BMW 320i	+2.868s	30
3	1	(Italy) Fabrizio Giovanardi	Alfa Romeo 156	+5.077s	24
4	22	(Italy) Roberto Colciago	Audi A4 Quattro	+5.627s	20
5	24	(Italy) Davide Bernasconi	Audi A4 Quattro	+1.31.045s	16
6	23	(Italy) Moreno Soli	Alfa Romeo 155	+1.42.881s	12
7	26	(Italy) Guido Lucchetti Cigarini	Audi A4 Quattro	+1.49.656s	8
DNF	2	(Italy) Nicola Larini	Alfa Romeo 156	+5 laps	
DNS	21	(Italy) Fabian Peroni	Alfa Romeo 156		
DNS	25	(Italy) Massimo Pigoli	BMW 320i		

=== Championship standings after Round 3 ===
Drivers' Championship standings

Pos	Driver	Points
1	(Italy) Fabrizio De Simone	142
2	(Italy) Emanuele Naspetti	139
3	(Italy) Fabrizio Giovanardi	112
4	(Italy) Roberto Colciago	108
5	(Italy) Nicola Larini	71

Constructors' Championship standings

Pos	Constructor	Points
1	(Germany) BMW	312
2	(Italy) Alfa Romeo	232
3	(Germany) Audi	166

== Round 4 (Italy) Pergusa ==
Qualifying

Pos	No	Driver	Car	Lap Time	Points
1	1	(Italy) Fabrizio Giovanardi	Alfa Romeo 156	1.42.152	1
2	3	(Italy) Emanuele Naspetti	BMW 320i	1.42.250	
3	2	(Italy) Nicola Larini	Alfa Romeo 156	1.42.435	
4	4	(Italy) Fabrizio De Simone	BMW 320i	1.43.010	
5	21	(Italy) Fabian Peroni	Alfa Romeo 156	1.43.129	
6	22	(Italy) Roberto Colciago	Audi A4 Quattro	1.44.403	
7	27	(Italy) Stefano Gabellini	BMW 320i	1.45.927	
8	24	(Italy) Davide Bernasconi	Audi A4 Quattro	1.48.137	
9	23	(Italy) Moreno Soli	Alfa Romeo 155	1.49.726	
10	26	(Italy) Guido Lucchetti Cigarini	Audi A4 Quattro	1.51.935	

Race 1

Pos	No	Driver	Constructor	Time/Retired	Points
1	1	(Italy) Fabrizio Giovanardi	Alfa Romeo 156	10 laps in 17:23.855	20
2	3	(Italy) Emanuele Naspetti	BMW 320i	+0.082s	15
3	2	(Italy) Nicola Larini	Alfa Romeo 156	+5.151s	12
4	21	(Italy) Fabian Peroni	Alfa Romeo 156	+14.603s	10
5	22	(Italy) Roberto Colciago	Audi A4 Quattro	+21.715s	8
6	4	(Italy) Fabrizio De Simone	BMW 320i	+39.263s	6
7	27	(Italy) Stefano Gabellini	BMW 320i	+51.433s	4
8	24	(Italy) Davide Bernasconi	Audi A4 Quattro	+56.256s	3
9	23	(Italy) Moreno Soli	Alfa Romeo 155	+1.00.956s	2
DNF	26	(Italy) Guido Lucchetti Cigarini	Audi A4 Quattro	+6 laps	

Race 2

Pos	No	Driver	Constructor	Time/Retired	Points
1	1	(Italy) Fabrizio Giovanardi	Alfa Romeo 156	18 laps in 31:40.567	40
2	2	(Italy) Nicola Larini	Alfa Romeo 156	+1.367s	30
3	21	(Italy) Fabian Peroni	Alfa Romeo 156	+2.765s	24
4	22	(Italy) Roberto Colciago	Audi A4 Quattro	+21.458s	20
5	4	(Italy) Fabrizio De Simone	BMW 320i	+1.37.563s	16
6	27	(Italy) Stefano Gabellini	BMW 320i	+1 lap	12
7	26	(Italy) Guido Lucchetti Cigarini	Audi A4 Quattro	+1 lap	8
8	24	(Italy) Davide Bernasconi	Audi A4 Quattro	+1 lap	6
9	23	(Italy) Moreno Soli	Alfa Romeo 155	+1 lap	4
DNF	3	(Italy) Emanuele Naspetti	BMW 320i	+17 laps	

=== Championship standings after Round 4 ===
Drivers' Championship standings

Pos	Driver	Points
1	(Italy) Fabrizio Giovanardi	173
2	(Italy) Fabrizio De Simone	164
3	(Italy) Emanuele Naspetti	154
4	(Italy) Roberto Colciago	136
5	(Italy) Nicola Larini	113

Constructors' Championship standings

Pos	Constructor	Points
1	(Italy) Alfa Romeo	375
2	(Germany) BMW	365
3	(Germany) Audi	211

== Round 5 (Italy) Magione ==
Qualifying

Pos	No	Driver	Car	Lap Time	Points
1	22	(Italy) Roberto Colciago	Audi A4	1.11.799	1
2	2	(Italy) Nicola Larini	Alfa Romeo 156	1.12.003	
3	4	(Italy) Fabrizio De Simone	BMW 320i	1.12.105	
4	1	(Italy) Fabrizio Giovanardi	Alfa Romeo 156	1.12.279	
5	3	(Italy) Emanuele Naspetti	BMW 320i	1.12.640	
6	21	(Italy) Fabian Peroni	Alfa Romeo 156	1.12.749	
7	27	(Italy) Stefano Gabellini	BMW 320i	1.13.687	
8	26	(Italy) Guido Lucchetti Cigarini	Audi A4 Quattro	1.14.891	
9	23	(Italy) Moreno Soli	Alfa Romeo 155	1.14.966	
10	24	(Italy) Davide Bernasconi	Audi A4 Quattro	no time	

Race 1

Pos	No	Driver	Constructor	Time/Retired	Points
1	22	(Italy) Roberto Colciago	Audi A4 Quattro	16 laps in 19:38.901	20
2	3	(Italy) Emanuele Naspetti	BMW 320i	+7.119s	15
3	21	(Italy) Fabian Peroni	Alfa Romeo 156	+15.860s	12
4	27	(Italy) Stefano Gabellini	BMW 320i	+21.265s	10
5	1	(Italy) Fabrizio Giovanardi	Alfa Romeo 156	+24.774s	8
6	24	(Italy) Davide Bernasconi	Audi A4 Quattro	+31.641s	6
7	26	(Italy) Guido Lucchetti Cigarini	Audi A4 Quattro	+39.563s	4
8	2	(Italy) Nicola Larini	Alfa Romeo 156	+3.807s	3
9	23	(Italy) Moreno Soli	Alfa Romeo 155	+10.312s	2
DNF	4	(Italy) Fabrizio De Simone	BMW 320i	+14 laps	

Race 2

Pos	No	Driver	Constructor	Time/Retired	Points
1	22	(Italy) Roberto Colciago	Audi A4 Quattro	26 laps in 33:07.577	40
2	3	(Italy) Emanuele Naspetti	BMW 320i	+20.052s	30
3	2	(Italy) Nicola Larini	Alfa Romeo 156	+32.228s	24
4	4	(Italy) Fabrizio De Simone	BMW 320i	+32.427s	20
5	21	(Italy) Fabian Peroni	Alfa Romeo 156	+37.191s	16
6	24	(Italy) Davide Bernasconi	Audi A4 Quattro	+39.938	12
7	27	(Italy) Stefano Gabellini	BMW 320i	+46.885s	8
8	23	(Italy) Moreno Soli	Alfa Romeo 155	+1 lap	4
DNS	1	(Italy) Fabrizio Giovanardi	Alfa Romeo 156		
DSQ	26	(Italy) Guido Lucchetti Cigarini	Audi A4 Quattro		

=== Championship standings after Round 5 ===
Drivers' Championship standings

Pos	Driver	Points
1	(Italy) Emanuele Naspetti	199
2	(Italy) Roberto Colciago	197
3	(Italy) Fabrizio De Simone	184
4	(Italy) Fabrizio Giovanardi	181
5	(Italy) Nicola Larini	140

Constructors' Championship standings

Pos	Constructor	Points
1	(Germany) BMW	448
2	(Italy) Alfa Romeo	446
3	(Germany) Audi	294

== Round 6 (Italy) Mugello ==
Qualifying

Pos	No	Driver	Car	Lap Time	Points
1	1	(Italy) Fabrizio Giovanardi	Alfa Romeo 156	1.53.873	1
2	2	(Italy) Nicola Larini	Alfa Romeo 156	1.54.706	
3	3	(Italy) Emanuele Naspetti	BMW 320i	1.55.447	
4	21	(Italy) Fabian Peroni	Alfa Romeo 156	1.55.656	
5	4	(Italy) Fabrizio De Simone	BMW 320i	1.55.949	
6	22	(Italy) Roberto Colciago	Audi A4 Quattro	1.56.637	
7	24	(Italy) Davide Bernasconi	Audi A4 Quattro	2.00.690	
8	23	(Italy) Moreno Soli	Alfa Romeo 155	2.01.255	
9	26	(Italy) Guido Lucchetti Cigarini	Audi A4 Quattro	2.02.386	
10	27	(Italy) Stefano Gabellini	BMW 320i	no time	

Race 1

Pos	No	Driver	Constructor	Time/Retired	Points
1	1	(Italy) Fabrizio Giovanardi	Alfa Romeo 156	9 laps in 17:44.163	20
2	3	(Italy) Emanuele Naspetti	BMW 320i	+7.346s	15
4	4	(Italy) Fabrizio De Simone	BMW 320i	+7.893s	12
4	22	(Italy) Roberto Colciago	Audi A4 Quattro	+18.741s	10
5	21	(Italy) Fabian Peroni	Alfa Romeo 156	+21.945s	8
6	27	(Italy) Stefano Gabellini	BMW 320i	+42.078s	6
7	24	(Italy) Davide Bernasconi	Audi A4 Quattro	+55.348s	4
8	26	(Italy) Guido Lucchetti Cigarini	Audi A4 Quattro	+56.540s	3
9	23	(Italy) Moreno Soli	Alfa Romeo 155	+1.15.923s	2
DNF	2	(Italy) Nicola Larini	Alfa Romeo 156	+5 laps	

Race 2

Pos	No	Driver	Constructor	Time/Retired	Points
1	1	(Italy) Fabrizio Giovanardi	Alfa Romeo 156	16 laps in 31:48.916	40
2	2	(Italy) Nicola Larini	Alfa Romeo 156	+0.297s	30
3	22	(Italy) Roberto Colciago	Audi A4 Quattro	+11.374s	24
4	3	(Italy) Emanuele Naspetti	BMW 320i	+19.254s	20
5	4	(Italy) Fabrizio De Simone	BMW 320i	+21.000s	16
6	27	(Italy) Stefano Gabellini	BMW 320i	+22.536s	12
7	21	(Italy) Fabian Peroni	Alfa Romeo 156	+30.412s	8
8	24	(Italy) Davide Bernasconi	Audi A4 Quattro	+1.30.554s	6
9	23	(Italy) Moreno Soli	Alfa Romeo 155	+1 lap	4
DNF	26	(Italy) Guido Lucchetti Cigarini	Audi A4 Quattro	+9 laps	

=== Championship standings after Round 6 ===
Drivers' Championship standings

Pos	Driver	Points
1	(Italy) Fabrizio Giovanardi	242
2	(Italy) Emanuele Naspetti	234
3	(Italy) Roberto Colciago	231
4	(Italy) Fabrizio De Simone	212
5	(Italy) Nicola Larini	170

Constructors' Championship standings

Pos	Constructor	Points
1	(Italy) Alfa Romeo	559
2	(Germany) BMW	529
3	(Germany) Audi	341

== Round 7 (Italy) Misano Adriatico ==
Qualifying

Pos	No	Driver	Car	Lap Time	Points
1	1	(Italy) Fabrizio Giovanardi	Alfa Romeo 156	1.34.232	1
2	2	(Italy) Nicola Larini	Alfa Romeo 156	1.34.286	
3	3	(Italy) Emanuele Naspetti	BMW 320i	1.34.668	
4	4	(Italy) Fabrizio De Simone	BMW 320i	1.35.025	
5	22	(Italy) Roberto Colciago	Audi A4 Quattro	1.36.036	
6	21	(Italy) Fabian Peroni	Alfa Romeo 156	1.36.525	
7	27	(Italy) Stefano Gabellini	BMW 320i	1.37.049	
8	24	(Italy) Davide Bernasconi	Audi A4 Quattro	1.38.509	
9	23	(Italy) Moreno Soli	Alfa Romeo 155	1.39.963	
10	26	(Italy) Guido Lucchetti Cigarini	Audi A4 Quattro	1.40.155	

Race 1

Pos	No	Driver	Constructor	Time/Retired	Points
1	2	(Italy) Nicola Larini	Alfa Romeo 156	11 laps in 17:45.636	20
2	3	(Italy) Emanuele Naspetti	BMW 320i	+2.655s	15
3	4	(Italy) Fabrizio De Simone	BMW 320i	+7.403s	12
4	1	(Italy) Fabrizio Giovanardi	Alfa Romeo 156	+9.230s	10
5	22	(Italy) Roberto Colciago	Audi A4 Quattro	+12.389s	8
6	21	(Italy) Fabian Peroni	Alfa Romeo 156	+25.743s	6
7	24	(Italy) Davide Bernasconi	Audi A4 Quattro	+47.978s	4
8	26	(Italy) Guido Lucchetti Cigarini	Audi A4 Quattro	+52.425	3
9	23	(Italy) Moreno Soli	Alfa Romeo 155	+59.619s	2
10	27	(Italy) Stefano Gabellini	BMW 320i	+1 lap	1

Race 2

Pos	No	Driver	Constructor	Time/Retired	Points
1	3	(Italy) Emanuele Naspetti	BMW 320i	20 laps in 32:19.046	40
2	1	(Italy) Fabrizio Giovanardi	Alfa Romeo 156	+6.001s	30
3	2	(Italy) Nicola Larini	Alfa Romeo 156	+6.601s	24
4	4	(Italy) Fabrizio De Simone	BMW 320i	+12.378s	20
5	22	(Italy) Roberto Colciago	Audi A4 Quattro	+22.145s	16
6	27	(Italy) Stefano Gabellini	BMW 320i	+1.13.060s	12
7	21	(Italy) Fabian Peroni	Alfa Romeo 156	+50.874s	8
8	24	(Italy) Davide Bernasconi	Audi A4 Quattro	+1.11.271s	6
9	26	(Italy) Guido Lucchetti Cigarini	Audi A4 Quattro	+1 lap	4
10	23	(Italy) Moreno Soli	Alfa Romeo 155	+1 lap	2

=== Championship standings after Round 7 ===
Drivers' Championship standings

Pos	Driver	Points
1	(Italy) Emanuele Naspetti	289
2	(Italy) Fabrizio Giovanardi	283
3	(Italy) Roberto Colciago	255
4	(Italy) Fabrizio De Simone	244
5	(Italy) Nicola Larini	214

Constructors' Championship standings

Pos	Constructor	Points
1	(Italy) Alfa Romeo	662
2	(Germany) BMW	629
3	(Germany) Audi	382

== Round 8 (Italy) Varano De Melegari ==
Qualifying

Pos	No	Driver	Car	Lap Time	Points
1	1	(Italy) Fabrizio Giovanardi	Alfa Romeo 156	47.562	1
2	2	(Italy) Nicola Larini	Alfa Romeo 156	47.590	
3	4	(Italy) Fabrizio De Simone	BMW 320i	47.685	
4	22	(Italy) Roberto Colciago	Audi A4 Quattro	47.862	
5	3	(Italy) Emanuele Naspetti	BMW 320i	47.936	
6	21	(Italy) Fabian Peroni	Alfa Romeo 156	48.274	
7	25	(Italy) Massimo Pigoli	BMW 320i	48.570	
8	24	(Italy) Davide Bernasconi	Audi A4 Quattro	49.427	
9	23	(Italy) Moreno Soli	Alfa Romeo 155	50.113	
10	26	(Italy) Guido Lucchetti Cigarini	Audi A4 Quattro	no time	

Race 1

Pos	No	Driver	Constructor	Time/Retired	Points
1	2	(Italy) Nicola Larini	Alfa Romeo 156	17 laps in 16:16.445	20
2	3	(Italy) Emanuele Naspetti	BMW 320i	+24.413s	15
3	25	(Italy) Massimo Pigoli	BMW 320i	+27.139s	12
4	4	(Italy) Fabrizio De Simone	BMW 320i	+44.286s	10
5	52	(Italy) Moreno Soli	Alfa Romeo 155	+46.340s	8
6	22	(Italy) Roberto Colciago	Audi A4 Quattro	+1 lap	6
7	24	(Italy) Davide Bernasconi	Audi A4 Quattro	+2 laps	4
DNF	21	(Italy) Fabian Peroni	Alfa Romeo 156	+7 laps	
DNF	1	(Italy) Fabrizio Giovanardi	Alfa Romeo 156	+11 laps	
DNF	26	(Italy) Guido Lucchetti Cigarini	Audi A4 Quattro	+16 laps	

Race 2

Pos	No	Driver	Constructor	Time/Retired	Points
1	22	(Italy) Roberto Colciago	Audi A4 Quattro	35 laps in 28:55.661	40
2	3	(Italy) Emanuele Naspetti	BMW 320i	+4.415s	30
3	2	(Italy) Nicola Larini	Alfa Romeo 156	+14.558s	24
4	4	(Italy) Fabrizio De Simone	BMW 320i	+44.286s	20
5	25	(Italy) Massimo Pigoli	BMW 320i	+27.139s	16
6	24	(Italy) Davide Bernasconi	Audi A4 Quattro	+9 laps	12
7	23	(Italy) Moreno Soli	Alfa Romeo 155	+4 laps	8
DNF	1	(Italy) Fabrizio Giovanardi	Alfa Romeo 156	+28 laps	
DNF	26	(Italy) Guido Lucchetti Cigarini	Audi A4 Quattro	+32 laps	
DNF	21	(Italy) Fabian Peroni	Alfa Romeo 156	+34 laps	

=== Championship standings after Round 8 ===
Drivers' Championship standings

Pos	Driver	Points
1	(Italy) Emanuele Naspetti	334
2	(Italy) Roberto Colciago	301
3	(Italy) Fabrizio Giovanardi	284
4	(Italy) Fabrizio De Simone	274
5	(Italy) Nicola Larini	258

Constructors' Championship standings

Pos	Constructor	Points
1	(Germany) BMW	732
2	(Italy) Alfa Romeo	723
3	(Germany) Audi	444

== Round 9 (Italy) Monza ==
Qualifying

Pos	No	Driver	Car	Lap Time	Points
1	1	(Italy) Fabrizio Giovanardi	Alfa Romeo 156	1.51.081	1
2	2	(Italy) Nicola Larini	Alfa Romeo 156	1.51.364	
3	21	(Italy) Fabian Peroni	Alfa Romeo 156	1.51.703	
4	3	(Italy) Emanuele Naspetti	BMW 320i	1.52.097	
5	4	(Italy) Fabrizio De Simone	BMW 320i	1.52.343	
6	22	(Italy) Roberto Colciago	Audi A4 Quattro	1.52.970	
7	25	(Italy) Massimo Pigoli	BMW 320i	1.53.150	
8	62	(Italy) Guido Lucchetti Cigarini	Audi A4 Quattro	1.57.672	
9	24	(Italy) Davide Bernasconi	Audi A4 Quattro	1.58.457	
10	25	(Italy) Moreno Soli	Alfa Romeo 155	1.59.562	
11	28	(Italy) Mauro Simoncini	Alfa Romeo 155	no time	

Race 1

Pos	No	Driver	Constructor	Time/Retired	Points
1	1	(Italy) Fabrizio Giovanardi	Alfa Romeo 156	9 laps in 19:10.341	20
2	2	(Italy) Nicola Larini	Alfa Romeo 156	+0.536s	15
3	21	(Italy) Fabian Peroni	Alfa Romeo 156	+0.906s	12
4	3	(Italy) Emanuele Naspetti	BMW 320i	+1.150s	10
5	22	(Italy) Roberto Colciago	Audi A4 Quattro	+2.445s	8
6	4	(Italy) Fabrizio De Simone	BMW 320i	+16.228s	6
7	26	(Italy) Guido Lucchetti Cigarini	Audi A4 Quattro	+10.811s	4
8	23	(Italy) Moreno Soli	Alfa Romeo 155	+14.587s	3
9	24	(Italy) Davide Bernasconi	Audi A4 Quattro	+14.856s	2
DNF	25	(Italy) Massimo Pigoli	BMW 320i	+5 laps	
DNS	28	(Italy) Mauro Simoncini	Alfa Romeo 155		

Race 2

Pos	No	Driver	Constructor	Time/Retired	Points
1	1	(Italy) Fabrizio Giovanardi	Alfa Romeo 156	16 laps in 30:42.163	40
2	2	(Italy) Nicola Larini	Alfa Romeo 156	+0.516s	30
3	21	(Italy) Fabian Peroni	Alfa Romeo 156	+1.749s	24
4	25	(Italy) Massimo Pigoli	BMW 320i	+2.237s	20
5	22	(Italy) Roberto Colciago	Audi A4 Quattro	+26.335s	16
6	26	(Italy) Guido Lucchetti Cigarini	Audi A4 Quattro	+58.018s	12
7	23	(Italy) Moreno Soli	Alfa Romeo 155	+1.44.648s	8
8	28	(Italy) Mauro Simoncini	Alfa Romeo 155	+1 lap	6
DNF	24	(Italy) Davide Bernasconi	Audi A4 Quattro	+11 laps	
DNF	3	(Italy) Emanuele Naspetti	BMW 320i	+14 laps	
DNF	4	(Italy) Fabrizio De Simone	BMW 320i	+14 laps	

=== Championship standings after Round 9 ===
Drivers' Championship standings

Pos	Driver	Points
1	(Italy) Fabrizio Giovanardi	345
2	(Italy) Emanuele Naspetti	344
3	(Italy) Roberto Colciago	325
4	(Italy) Nicola Larini	303
4	(Italy) Fabrizio De Simone	280

Constructors' Championship standings

Pos	Constructor	Points
1	(Italy) Alfa Romeo	882
2	(Germany) BMW	768
3	(Germany) Audi	486

== Round 10 (Italy) Vallelunga ==
Qualifying

Pos	No	Driver	Car	Lap Time	Points
1	1	(Italy) Fabrizio Giovanardi	Alfa Romeo 156	1.12.709	1
2	2	(Italy) Nicola Larini	Alfa Romeo 156	1.12.962	
3	3	(Italy) Emanuele Naspetti	BMW 320i	1.13.337	
4	21	(Italy) Fabian Peroni	Alfa Romeo 156	1.13.738	
5	4	(Italy) Fabrizio De Simone	BMW 320i	1.13.746	
6	22	(Italy) Roberto Colciago	Audi A4 Quattro	1.14.184	
7	24	(Italy) Davide Bernasconi	Audi A4 Quattro	1.16.673	
8	26	(Italy) Guido Lucchetti Cigarini	Audi A4 Quattro	1.17.380	
9	23	(Italy) Moreno Soli	Alfa Romeo 155	1.21.082	
10	25	(Italy) Massimo Pigoli	BMW 320i	no time	

Race 1

Pos	No	Driver	Constructor	Time/Retired	Points
1	2	(Italy) Nicola Larini	Alfa Romeo 156	15 laps in 18:49.987	20
2	1	(Italy) Fabrizio Giovanardi	Alfa Romeo 156	+0.232s	15
3	3	(Italy) Emanuele Naspetti	BMW 320i	+0.586s	12
4	4	(Italy) Fabrizio De Simone	BMW 320i	+5.027s	10
5	22	(Italy) Roberto Colciago	Audi A4 Quattro	+7.245s	8
6	21	(Italy) Fabian Peroni	Alfa Romeo 156	+10.518s	6
7	25	(Italy) Massimo Pigoli	BMW 320i	+13.505s	4
8	24	(Italy) Davide Bernasconi	Audi A4 Quattro	+53.369s	3
9	26	(Italy) Guido Lucchetti Cigarini	Audi A4 Quattro	+57.991s	2
10	23	(Italy) Moreno Soli	Alfa Romeo 155	+1 lap	1

Race 2

Pos	No	Driver	Constructor	Time/Retired	Points
1	1	(Italy) Fabrizio Giovanardi	Alfa Romeo 156	27 laps in 35:12.916	40
2	3	(Italy) Emanuele Naspetti	BMW 320i	+2.089s	30
3	4	(Italy) Fabrizio De Simone	BMW 320i	+2.611s	24
4	2	(Italy) Nicola Larini	Alfa Romeo 156	+3.080s	20
5	22	(Italy) Roberto Colciago	Audi A4 Quattro	+10.532s	16
6	25	(Italy) Massimo Pigoli	BMW 320i	+15.032s	12
7	21	(Italy) Fabian Peroni	Alfa Romeo 156	+15.074s	8
8	26	(Italy) Guido Lucchetti Cigarini	Audi A4 Quattro	+1.15.326s	6
9	24	(Italy) Davide Bernasconi	Audi A4 Quattro	+1 lap	4
DNF	23	(Italy) Moreno Soli	Alfa Romeo 155	+9 laps	

=== Championship standings after (Final) Round 10 ===
Drivers' Championship standings

Pos	Driver	Points
1	(Italy) Fabrizio Giovanardi	401
1	(Italy) Emanuele Naspetti	386
3	(Italy) Roberto Colciago	348
4	(Italy) Nicola Larini	343
5	(Italy) Fabrizio De Simone	314

Constructors' Championship standings

Pos	Constructor	Points
1	(Italy) Alfa Romeo	993
2	(Germany) BMW	860
3	(Germany) Audi	525

== Championship standings ==
Points system
**Race 1**	**1st**	**2nd**	**3rd**	**4th**	**5th**	**6th**	**7th**	**8th**	**9th**	**10th**	Pole position
	20	15	12	10	8	6	4	3	2	1	1
**Race 2**	**1st**	**2nd**	**3rd**	**4th**	**5th**	**6th**	**7th**	**8th**	**9th**	**10th**	
	40	30	24	20	16	12	8	6	4	2	

=== Drivers' Championship ===
Pos	Driver	Car	MIS (Italy)		BIN (Italy)		IMO (Italy)		PER (Italy)		MAG (Italy)		MUG (Italy)		MIS (Italy)		VAR (Italy)		MON (Italy)		VAL (Italy)		Pts
1	(Italy) Fabrizio Giovanardi	Alfa Romeo	4	2	3	4	2	3	**1**	**1**	**5**	DNS	**1**	**1**	**4**	2	**Ret**	Ret	**1**	**1**	**2**	1	401
2	(Italy) Emanuele Naspetti	BMW	2	4	1	**3**	**1**	**1**	2	Ret	2	2	2	4	2	1	2	2	4	Ret	3	2	387
3	(Italy) Roberto Colciago	Audi	5	5	**2**	1	5	4	5	4	1	**1**	4	3	5	5	6	1	5	5	5	5	348
4	(Italy) Nicola Larini	Alfa Romeo	**3**	3	5	5	4	Ret	3	2	8	3	Ret	2	1	**3**	1	**3**	2	2	1	**4**	343
5	(Italy) Fabrizio de Simone	BMW	1	**1**	4	2	3	2	6	5	Ret	4	3	5	3	4	4	4	6	Ret	4	3	314
6	(Italy) Fabian Peroni	Alfa Romeo	6	Ret	6	Ret	6	DNS	4	3	3	5	5	7	6	7	Ret	Ret	3	3	6	7	160
7	(Italy) Davide Bernasconi	Audi	7	Ret	7	7	Ret	5	8	8	6	6	7	8	7	8	7	6	9	Ret	8	9	104
8	(Italy) Massimo Pigoli	BMW	9	6	8	6	9	DNS									3	5	Ret	4	7	6	95
9	(Italy) Moreno Soli	Alfa Romeo	8	7	10	9	8	6	9	9	9	8	9	9	9	10	5	7	8	7	10	Ret	83
10	(Italy) Guido Lucchetti Cigarini	Audi	Ret	8	9	8	7	7	Ret	7	7	DSQ	8	Ret	8	9	Ret	Ret	7	6	9	8	72
11	(Italy) Stefano Gabellini	BMW							7	6	4	7	6	6	10	6							65
12	(Italy) Mauro Simoncini	Alfa Romeo																	DNS	8			6
Pos	Driver	MIS (Italy)		BIN (Italy)		IMO (Italy)		PER (Italy)		MAG (Italy)		MUG (Italy)		MIS (Italy)		VAR (Italy)		MON (Italy)		VAL (Italy)		Pts	

Colour	Result
Gold	Winner
Silver	Second place
Bronze	Third place
Green	Points classification
Blue	Non-points classification
Blue	Non-classified finish (NC)
Purple	Retired, not classified (Ret)
Red	Did not qualify (DNQ)
Red	Did not pre-qualify (DNPQ)
Black	Disqualified (DSQ)
White	Did not start (DNS)
White	Withdrew (WD)
White	Race cancelled (C)
Blank	Did not practice (DNP)
Blank	Did not arrive (DNA)
Blank	Excluded (EX)

**Bold** – Pole
Italics – Fastest Lap

=== Manufacturers' Trophy ===
Pos	Manufacturer	Points
1	(Italy) Alfa Romeo	993
2	(Germany) BMW	860
3	(Germany) Audi	525

=== Privateers' Championship ===
Pos	Driver	Car	MIS (Italy)		BIN (Italy)		IMO (Italy)		PER (Italy)		MAG (Italy)		MUG (Italy)		MIS (Italy)		VAR (Italy)		MON (Italy)		VAL (Italy)		Pts
1	(Italy) Roberto Colciago	Audi	1	1	1	1	1	1	2	2	1	1	1	1	1	1	3	1	2	3	1	1	556
2	(Italy) Fabian Peroni	Alfa Romeo	2	DSQ	2	Ret	2	DNS	1	1	2	2	2	3	2	3	Ret	Ret	1	1	2	3	327
3	(Italy) Davide Bernasconi	Audi	3	Ret	3	3	Ret	2	4	5	3	3	4	4	3	4	4	3	5	Ret	3	5	264
4	(Italy) Moreno Soli	Alfa Romeo	4	3	6	5	4	3	5	6	5	5	6	5	5	6	2	3	4	4	6	Ret	241
5	(Italy) Massimo Pigoli	BMW	4	2	4	2	Ret	DNS									1	2	Ret	2	3	2	208
6	(Italy) Guido Lucchetti Cigarini	Audi	Ret	4	5	4	3	4	Ret	4	5	DSQ	5	Ret	4	5	Ret	Ret	3	4	5	4	198
7	(Italy) Stefano Gabellini	BMW							3	3	3	4	3	2	6	2							146
8	(Italy) Mauro Simoncini	Alfa Romeo																	DNS	6			12
Pos	Driver	Car	MIS (Italy)		BIN (Italy)		IMO (Italy)		PER (Italy)		MAG (Italy)		MUG (Italy)		MIS (Italy)		VAR (Italy)		MON (Italy)		VAL (Italy)		Pts

Colour	Result
Gold	Winner
Silver	Second place
Bronze	Third place
Green	Points classification
Blue	Non-points classification
Blue	Non-classified finish (NC)
Purple	Retired, not classified (Ret)
Red	Did not qualify (DNQ)
Red	Did not pre-qualify (DNPQ)
Black	Disqualified (DSQ)
White	Did not start (DNS)
White	Withdrew (WD)
White	Race cancelled (C)
Blank	Did not practice (DNP)
Blank	Did not arrive (DNA)
Blank	Excluded (EX)
