= 2002 European Touring Car Championship =

Motorsport contest

Seasons
- ← 2001 2003 →

The 2002 FIA European Touring Car Championship was the 29th season of European touring car racing and the second season of the European Touring Car Championship.

The season began at Magny-Cours on 20 April, and finished at Estoril on 20 October after twenty races over ten meetings.

It was the first European Touring Car season to be run according to Super 2000 regulations, replacing Super Touring.

== Teams and drivers ==
Team	Car	No.	Drivers	Rounds
(Italy) GTA Racing Team Nordauto	Alfa Romeo 156 GTA	1	(Italy) Fabrizio Giovanardi	All
(Italy) GTA Racing Team Nordauto	Alfa Romeo 156 GTA	2	(Italy) Nicola Larini	All
(Italy) GTA Racing Team Nordauto	Alfa Romeo 156 GTA	3	(Italy) Romana Bernardoni	1–8, 10
(Italy) GTA Racing Team Nordauto	Alfa Romeo 156 GTA	4	(Italy) Roberto Colciago	8–9
(Italy) GTA Racing Team Nordauto	Alfa Romeo 156 GTA	56	(Italy) Gabriele Tarquini	9
BMW Team Spain (Italy) Ravaglia Motorsport	BMW 320i	5	(Spain) Jordi Gené	All
BMW Team Spain (Italy) Ravaglia Motorsport	BMW 320i	6	(Italy) Fabrizio de Simone	All
BMW Team Spain (Italy) Ravaglia Motorsport	BMW 320i	24	(Italy) Gianluca de Lorenzi	8
BMW Team Belgium	BMW 320i	10	(Sweden) Fredrik Ekblom	1–8, 10
(Germany) BMW Team Deutschland	BMW 320i	42	(Germany) Jörg Müller	All
(Germany) BMW Team Deutschland	BMW 320i	43	(Germany) Dirk Müller	All
(Netherlands) Carly Motors Team Isert	BMW 320i	7	(Netherlands) Tom Coronel	1–7, 9–10
(Netherlands) Carly Motors Team Isert	BMW 320i	8	(Italy) Gianni Morbidelli	1–4
(Netherlands) Carly Motors Team Isert	BMW 320i	8	(Netherlands) Duncan Huisman	5, 7, 9–10
(Netherlands) Carly Motors Team Isert	BMW 320i	9	(Netherlands) Peter Kox	1–5
(Netherlands) Carly Motors Team Isert	BMW 320i	22	(Belgium) Pierre-Yves Corthals	7, 9
(United Kingdom) RJN Motorsport	Nissan Primera	11	(Norway) Tommy Rustad	All
(United Kingdom) RJN Motorsport	Nissan Primera	12	(United Kingdom) Chris Goodwin	5
(United Kingdom) RJN Motorsport	Nissan Primera	23	(United Kingdom) Chris Buncombe	7
(United Kingdom) RJN Motorsport	Nissan Primera	26	(United Kingdom) Rob Collard	8–10
(Italy) AGS Motorsport	Alfa Romeo 156 GTA	14	(Italy) Paolo Ruberti	1–7
(Italy) AGS Motorsport	Alfa Romeo 156 GTA	25	(Italy) Domenico Guagliardo	8
(Italy) AGS Motorsport	Alfa Romeo 156 GTA	27	(United Kingdom) Iain Inglis	9
(Italy) AGS Motorsport	Alfa Romeo 156 GTA	28	(Italy) Marco Antonelli	10
(Italy) Scuderia Bigazzi	Alfa Romeo 156 GTA	15	(Spain) Luis Villamil	All
(Italy) Scuderia Bigazzi	Alfa Romeo 156 GTA	16	(France) Éric Cayrolle	All
(Italy) CiBiEmme Team	Honda Civic Type-R	18	(Italy) Salvatore Tavano	All
(Italy) CiBiEmme Team	Honda Civic Type-R	19	(Italy) Sandro Sardelli	2–9
(United Kingdom) DART Racing	Alfa Romeo 156 GTA	20	(United Kingdom) Tom Ferrier	All
(Sweden) Flash Engineering	Volvo S60	30	(Sweden) Jens Edman	5
(Sweden) Flash Engineering	Volvo S60	32	(Sweden) Jan 'Flash' Nilsson	5
(Germany) Team Hotfielt Sport	Ford Focus ST170	31	(Germany) Thomas Klenke	6
(Sweden) Volvo S60 Racing Team	Volvo S60	60	(Sweden) Rickard Rydell	All
(Sweden) Volvo S60 Racing Team	Volvo S60	61	(United Kingdom) James Hanson	All

== Results and standings ==
=== Races ===
Race	Race name	Date	Pole position	Fastest lap	Winning driver	Winning team
1	(France) Magny-Cours	21 April	(Italy) Fabrizio Giovanardi	(Italy) Fabrizio Giovanardi	(Italy) Fabrizio Giovanardi	(Italy) GTA Racing Team Nordauto
2	(France) Magny-Cours	21 April		(Italy) Nicola Larini	(Italy) Fabrizio Giovanardi	(Italy) GTA Racing Team Nordauto
3	(United Kingdom) Silverstone	5 May	(Italy) Fabrizio Giovanardi	(Sweden) Rickard Rydell	(Italy) Nicola Larini	(Italy) GTA Racing Team Nordauto
4	(United Kingdom) Silverstone	5 May		(Italy) Nicola Larini	(Italy) Fabrizio Giovanardi	(Italy) GTA Racing Team Nordauto
5	(Czech Republic) Brno	19 May	(Italy) Fabrizio Giovanardi	(Sweden) Rickard Rydell	(Italy) Fabrizio Giovanardi	(Italy) GTA Racing Team Nordauto
6	(Czech Republic) Brno	19 May		(Italy) Fabrizio Giovanardi	(Italy) Fabrizio Giovanardi	(Italy) GTA Racing Team Nordauto
7	(Spain) Jarama	2 June	(Italy) Fabrizio Giovanardi	(Italy) Fabrizio Giovanardi	(Italy) Fabrizio Giovanardi	(Italy) GTA Racing Team Nordauto
8	(Spain) Jarama	2 June		(Italy) Fabrizio Giovanardi	(Italy) Nicola Larini	(Italy) GTA Racing Team Nordauto
9	(Sweden) Anderstorp	30 June	(Italy) Nicola Larini	(Italy) Fabrizio Giovanardi	(Italy) Nicola Larini	(Italy) GTA Racing Team Nordauto
10	(Sweden) Anderstorp	30 June		(Italy) Nicola Larini	(Germany) Jörg Müller	(Germany) BMW Team Deutschland
11	(Germany) Oschersleben	14 July	(Netherlands) Tom Coronel	(Germany) Jörg Müller	(Germany) Dirk Müller	(Germany) BMW Team Deutschland
12	(Germany) Oschersleben	14 July		(Germany) Dirk Müller	(Germany) Dirk Müller	(Germany) BMW Team Deutschland
13	(Belgium) Spa-Francorchamps	4 August	(Italy) Nicola Larini	(Sweden) Fredrik Ekblom	(Italy) Nicola Larini	(Italy) GTA Racing Team Nordauto
14	(Belgium) Spa-Francorchamps	4 August		(Italy) Nicola Larini	(Germany) Jörg Müller	(Germany) BMW Team Deutschland
15	(Italy) Pergusa	22 September	(Italy) Fabrizio Giovanardi	(Italy) Fabrizio Giovanardi	(Italy) Fabrizio Giovanardi	(Italy) GTA Racing Team Nordauto
16	(Italy) Pergusa	22 September		(Italy) Roberto Colciago	(Italy) Fabrizio Giovanardi	(Italy) GTA Racing Team Nordauto
17	(United Kingdom) Donington Park	6 October	(Germany) Dirk Müller	(Germany) Jörg Müller	(Germany) Dirk Müller	(Germany) BMW Team Deutschland
18	(United Kingdom) Donington Park	6 October		(Italy) Gabriele Tarquini	(Germany) Jörg Müller	(Germany) BMW Team Deutschland
19	(Portugal) Estoril	20 October	(Sweden) Rickard Rydell	(Germany) Jörg Müller	(Italy) Fabrizio Giovanardi	(Italy) GTA Racing Team Nordauto
20	(Portugal) Estoril	20 October		(Italy) Fabrizio Giovanardi	(Germany) Jörg Müller	(Germany) BMW Team Deutschland

== Round 1 (France) Magny-Cours ==
Qualifying Grid 1

Pos	No	Driver	Car	Lap Time
1	1	(Italy) Fabrizio Giovanardi	Alfa Romeo 156 GTA	1.47.113
2	2	(Italy) Nicola Larini	Alfa Romeo 156 GTA	1.47.326
3	43	(Germany) Dirk Müller	BMW 320i	1.48.075
4	14	(Italy) Paolo Ruberti	Alfa Romeo 156 GTA	1.48.239
5	20	(United Kingdom) Tom Ferrier	Alfa Romeo 156 GTA	1.48.289
6	11	(Norway) Tommy Rustad	Nissan Primera	1.48.380
7	42	(Germany) Jörg Müller	BMW 320i	1.48.487
8	60	(Sweden) Rickard Rydell	Volvo S60	1.48.711
9	10	(Sweden) Fredrik Ekblom	BMW 320i	1.48.788
10	16	(France) Eric Cayrolle	Alfa Romeo 156 GTA	1.48.838
11	8	(Italy) Gianni Morbidelli	BMW 320i	1.48.878
12	6	(Italy) Fabrizio De Simone	BMW 320i	1.48.891
13	15	(Spain) Luis Villamil	Alfa Romeo 156 GTA	1.48.912
14	61	(United Kingdom) James Hanson	Volvo S60	1.49.320
15	5	(Spain) Jordi Gene	BMW 320i	1.49.377
16	9	(Netherlands) Peter Kox	BMW 320i	1.49.492
17	3	(Italy) Romana Bernardoni	Alfa Romeo 156 GTA	1.49.608
18	7	(Netherlands) Tom Coronel	BMW 320i	1.50.028
19	18	(Italy) Salvatore Tavano	Honda Civic Type-R	2.01.240

Race 1

Pos	No	Driver	Constructor	Time/Retired	Points
1	1	(Italy) Fabrizio Giovanardi	Alfa Romeo 156 GTA	12 laps in 21:50.779	10
2	2	(Italy) Nicola Larini	Alfa Romeo 156 GTA	+1.789s	6
3	43	(Germany) Dirk Müller	BMW 320i	+2.324s	4
4	60	(Sweden) Rickard Rydell	Volvo S60	+7.756s	3
5	42	(Germany) Jörg Müller	BMW 320i	+8.999s	2
6	10	(Sweden) Fredrik Ekblom	BMW 320i	+9.500s	1
7	15	(Spain) Luis Villamil	Alfa Romeo 156 GTA	+21.427s	
8	9	(Netherlands) Peter Kox	BMW 320i	+25.255s	
9	6	(Italy) Fabrizio De Simone	BMW 320i	+28.774s	
10	8	(Italy) Gianni Morbidelli	BMW 320i	+29.326s	
11	5	(Spain) Jordi Gene	BMW 320i	+32.062s	
12	7	(Netherlands) Tom Coronel	BMW 320i	+33.826s	
13	3	(Italy) Romana Bernardoni	Alfa Romeo 156 GTA	+35.540s	
14	61	(United Kingdom) James Hanson	Volvo S60	+40.215s	
15	18	(Italy) Salvatore Tavano	Honda Civic Type-R	+1 lap	
DNF	16	(France) Eric Cayrolle	Alfa Romeo 156 GTA	+10 laps	
DNF	11	(Norway) Tommy Rustad	Nissan Primera	+10 laps	
DNF	20	(United Kingdom) Tom Ferrier	Alfa Romeo 156 GTA	+11 laps	
DNF	14	(Italy) Paolo Ruberti	Alfa Romeo 156 GTA	+11 laps	

Grid 2

Pos	No	Driver	Car
1	10	(Sweden) Fredrik Ekblom	BMW 320i
2	42	(Germany) Jörg Müller	BMW 320i
3	60	(Sweden) Rickard Rydell	Volvo S60
4	43	(Germany) Dirk Müller	BMW 320i
5	2	(Italy) Nicola Larini	Alfa Romeo 156 GTA
6	1	(Italy) Fabrizio Giovanardi	Alfa Romeo 156 GTA
7	15	(Spain) Luis Villamil	Alfa Romeo 156 GTA
8	9	(Netherlands) Peter Kox	BMW 320i
9	6	(Italy) Fabrizio De Simone	BMW 320i
10	8	(Italy) Gianni Morbidelli	BMW 320i
11	5	(Spain) Jordi Gene	BMW 320i
12	7	(Netherlands) Tom Coronel	BMW 320i
13	3	(Italy) Romana Bernardoni	Alfa Romeo 156 GTA
14	61	(United Kingdom) James Hanson	Volvo S60
15	18	(Italy) Salvatore Tavano	Honda Civic Type-R
16	16	(France) Eric Cayrolle	Alfa Romeo 156 GTA
17	20	(United Kingdom) Tom Ferrier	Alfa Romeo 156 GTA
18	14	(Italy) Paolo Ruberti	Alfa Romeo 156 GTA
19	11	(Norway) Tommy Rustad	Nissan Primera

Race 2

Pos	No	Driver	Constructor	Time/Retired	Points
1	1	(Italy) Fabrizio Giovanardi	Alfa Romeo 156 GTA	12 laps in 22:03.622	10
2	2	(Italy) Nicola Larini	Alfa Romeo 156 GTA	+0.868s	6
3	43	(Germany) Dirk Müller	BMW 320i	+6.245s	4
4	60	(Sweden) Rickard Rydell	Volvo S60	+7.493s	3
5	42	(Germany) Jörg Müller	BMW 320i	+8.041s	2
6	10	(Sweden) Fredrik Ekblom	BMW 320i	+10.144s	1
7	8	(Italy) Gianni Morbidelli	BMW 320i	+23.930s	
8	5	(Spain) Jordi Gene	BMW 320i	+24.380s	
9	6	(Italy) Fabrizio De Simone	BMW 320i	+27.013s	
10	11	(Norway) Tommy Rustad	Nissan Primera	+29.328s	
11	15	(Spain) Luis Villamil	Alfa Romeo 156 GTA	+30.315s	
12	18	(Italy) Salvatore Tavano	Honda Civic Type-R	+1.56.509s	
13 DNF	16	(France) Eric Cayrolle	Alfa Romeo 156 GTA	+1 lap	
14 DNF	20	(United Kingdom) Tom Ferrier	Alfa Romeo 156 GTA	+1 lap	
15	3	(Italy) Romana Bernardoni	Alfa Romeo 156 GTA	+1 lap	
DNF	7	(Netherlands) Tom Coronel	BMW 320i	+7 laps	
DNF	9	(Netherlands) Peter Kox	BMW 320i	+9 laps	
DNF	61	(United Kingdom) James Hanson	Volvo S60	+11 laps	
DNS	14	(Italy) Paolo Ruberti	Alfa Romeo 156 GTA		

=== Championship standings after Round 1 ===
Drivers' Championship standings

Pos	Driver	Points
1	(Italy) Fabrizio Giovanardi	20
2	(Italy) Nicola Larini	12
3	(Germany) Dirk Müller	8
4	(Sweden) Rickard Rydell	6
5	(Germany) Jörg Müller	4

Constructors' Championship standings

Pos	Constructor	Points
1	(Italy) Alfa Romeo	32
2	(Germany) BMW	12
3	(Sweden) Volvo	6
4	(Japan) Nissan	0

== Round 2 (United Kingdom) Silverstone ==
Qualifying Grid 1

Pos	No	Driver	Car	Lap Time
1	1	(Italy) Fabrizio Giovanardi	Alfa Romeo 156 GTA	2.00.153
2	2	(Italy) Nicola Larini	Alfa Romeo 156 GTA	2.00.349
3	60	(Sweden) Rickard Rydell	Volvo S60	2.00.693
4	20	(United Kingdom) Tom Ferrier	Alfa Romeo 156 GTA	2.01.150
5	42	(Germany) Jörg Müller	BMW 320i	2.01.198
6	9	(Netherlands) Peter Kox	BMW 320i	2.01.265
7	43	(Germany) Dirk Müller	BMW 320i	2.01.271
8	10	(Sweden) Fredrik Ekblom	BMW 320i	2.01.424
9	14	(Italy) Paolo Ruberti	Alfa Romeo 156 GTA	2.01.708
10	7	(Netherlands) Tom Coronel	BMW 320i	2.01.829
11	11	(Norway) Tommy Rustad	Nissan Primera	2.01.958
12	15	(Spain) Luis Villamil	Alfa Romeo 156 GTA	2.02.249
13	3	(Italy) Romana Bernardoni	Alfa Romeo 156 GTA	2.02.412
14	5	(Spain) Jordi Gene	BMW 320i	2.02.540
15	61	(United Kingdom) James Hanson	Volvo S60	2.02.574
16	6	(Italy) Fabrizio De Simone	BMW 320i	2.02.959
17	8	(Italy) Gianni Morbidelli	BMW 320i	2.03.029
18	16	(France) Eric Cayrolle	Alfa Romeo 156 GTA	2.03.136
19	18	(Italy) Salvatore Tavano	Honda Civic Type-R	2.05.168

Race 1

Pos	No	Driver	Constructor	Time/Retired	Points
1	2	(Italy) Nicola Larini	Alfa Romeo 156 GTA	10 laps in 20:43.162	10
2	1	(Italy) Fabrizio Giovanardi	Alfa Romeo 156 GTA	+1.259s	6
3	42	(Germany) Jörg Müller	BMW 320i	+2.483s	4
4	60	(Sweden) Rickard Rydell	Volvo S60	+2.689s	3
5	43	(Germany) Dirk Müller	BMW 320i	+3.335s	2
6	14	(Italy) Paolo Ruberti	Alfa Romeo 156 GTA	+11.330s	1
7	16	(France) Eric Cayrolle	Alfa Romeo 156 GTA	+11.574s	
8	7	(Netherlands) Tom Coronel	BMW 320i	+14.414s	
9	15	(Spain) Luis Villamil	Alfa Romeo 156 GTA	+16.286s	
10	10	(Sweden) Fredrik Ekblom	BMW 320i	+19.051s	
11	11	(Norway) Tommy Rustad	Nissan Primera	+21.463s	
12	6	(Italy) Fabrizio De Simone	BMW 320i	+25.063s	
13	18	(Italy) Salvatore Tavano	Honda Civic Type-R	+52.984s	
14	3	(Italy) Romana Bernardoni	Alfa Romeo 156 GTA	+58.293s	
15 DNF	8	(Italy) Gianni Morbidelli	BMW 320i	+3 laps	
DNF	20	(United Kingdom) Tom Ferrier	Alfa Romeo 156 GTA	+9 laps	
DNF	5	(Spain) Jordi Gene	BMW 320i	+10 laps	
DNF	9	(Netherlands) Peter Kox	BMW 320i	+10 laps	
DNF	61	(United Kingdom) James Hanson	Volvo S60	+10 laps	

Grid 2

Pos	No	Driver	Car
1	14	(Italy) Paolo Ruberti	Alfa Romeo 156 GTA
2	43	(Germany) Dirk Müller	BMW 320i
3	60	(Sweden) Rickard Rydell	Volvo S60
4	42	(Germany) Jörg Müller	BMW 320i
5	1	(Italy) Fabrizio Giovanardi	Alfa Romeo 156 GTA
6	2	(Italy) Nicola Larini	Alfa Romeo 156 GTA
7	16	(France) Eric Cayrolle	Alfa Romeo 156 GTA
8	7	(Netherlands) Tom Coronel	BMW 320i
9	15	(Spain) Luis Villamil	Alfa Romeo 156 GTA
10	10	(Sweden) Fredrik Ekblom	BMW 320i
11	11	(Norway) Tommy Rustad	Nissan Primera
12	6	(Italy) Fabrizio De Simone	BMW 320i
13	18	(Italy) Salvatore Tavano	Honda Civic Type-R
14	3	(Italy) Romana Bernardoni	Alfa Romeo 156 GTA
15	8	(Italy) Gianni Morbidelli	BMW 320i
16	20	(United Kingdom) Tom Ferrier	Alfa Romeo 156 GTA
17	9	(Netherlands) Peter Kox	BMW 320i
18	5	(Spain) Jordi Gene	BMW 320i
19	61	(United Kingdom) James Hanson	Volvo S60

Race 2

Pos	No	Driver	Constructor	Time/Retired	Points
1	1	(Italy) Fabrizio Giovanardi	Alfa Romeo 156	10 laps in 20:35.188	10
2	2	(Italy) Nicola Larini	Alfa Romeo 156	+0.418s	6
3	60	(Sweden) Rickard Rydell	Volvo S60	+4.689s	4
4	43	(Germany) Dirk Müller	BMW 320i	+5.271s	3
5	14	(Italy) Paolo Ruberti	Alfa Romeo 156 GTA	+9.721s	2
6	10	(Sweden) Fredrik Ekblom	BMW 320i	+10.400s	1
7	15	(Spain) Luis Villamil	Alfa Romeo 156 GTA	+11.230s	
8	42	(Germany) Jörg Müller	BMW 320i	+11.658s	
9	6	(Italy) Fabrizio De Simone	BMW 320i	+23.164s	
10	18	(Italy) Salvatore Tavano	Honda Civic Type-R	+45.383s	
11	3	(Italy) Romana Bernardoni	Alfa Romeo 156 GTA	+1 lap	
12 DNF	16	(France) Eric Cayrolle	Alfa Romeo 156 GTA	+2 laps	
DNF	7	(Netherlands) Tom Coronel	BMW 320i	+9 laps	
DNF	61	(United Kingdom) James Hanson	Volvo S60	+9 laps	
DNF	11	(Norway) Tommy Rustad	Nissan Primera	+10 laps	
DNS	8	(Italy) Gianni Morbidelli	BMW 320i		
DNS	5	(Spain) Jordi Gene	BMW 320i		
DNS	20	(United Kingdom) Tom Ferrier	Alfa Romeo 156 GTA		
DNS	9	(Netherlands) Peter Kox	BMW 320i		

=== Championship standings after Round 2 ===
Drivers' Championship standings

Pos	Driver	Points
1	(Italy) Fabrizio Giovanardi	36
2	(Italy) Nicola Larini	28
3	(Germany) Dirk Müller	13
3	(Sweden) Rickard Rydell	13
5	(Germany) Jörg Müller	8

Constructors' Championship standings

Pos	Constructor	Points
1	(Italy) Alfa Romeo	64
2	(Germany) BMW	22
3	(Sweden) Volvo	13
4	(Japan) Nissan	0

== Round 3 (Czech Republic) Brno ==
Qualifying Grid 1

Pos	No	Driver	Car	Lap Time
1	1	(Italy) Fabrizio Giovanardi	Alfa Romeo 156 GTA	2.13.144
2	60	(Sweden) Rickard Rydell	Volvo S60	2.13.195
3	2	(Italy) Nicola Larini	Alfa Romeo 156 GTA	2.14.016
4	43	(Germany) Dirk Müller	BMW 320i	2.14.154
5	61	(United Kingdom) James Hanson	Volvo S60	2.14.270
6	10	(Sweden) Fredrik Ekblom	BMW 320i	2.14.337
7	14	(Italy) Paolo Ruberti	Alfa Romeo 156 GTA	2.14.497
8	15	(Spain) Luis Villamil	Alfa Romeo 156 GTA	2.14.555
9	42	(Germany) Jörg Müller	BMW 320i	2.14.646
10	7	(Netherlands) Tom Coronel	BMW 320i	2.14.679
11	5	(Spain) Jordi Gene	BMW 320i	2.14.753
12	9	(Netherlands) Peter Kox	BMW 320i	2.14.900
13	16	(France) Eric Cayrolle	Alfa Romeo 156 GTA	2.14.962
14	8	(Italy) Gianni Morbidelli	BMW 320i	2.15.431
15	6	(Italy) Fabrizio De Simone	BMW 320i	2.15.588
16	20	(United Kingdom) Tom Ferrier	Alfa Romeo 156 GTA	2.15.627
17	3	(Italy) Romana Bernardoni	Alfa Romeo 156 GTA	2.16.265
18	18	(Italy) Salvatore Tavano	Honda Civic Type-R	2.17.006
19	19	(Italy) Sandro Sardelli	Honda Civic Type-R	2.19.408
20	11	(Norway) Tommy Rustad	Nissan Primera	2.15.978*

- Rustad times disallowed due to engine change

Race 1

Pos	No	Driver	Constructor	Time/Retired	Points
1	1	(Italy) Fabrizio Giovanardi	Alfa Romeo 156 GTA	10 laps in 22:38.607	10
2	43	(Germany) Dirk Müller	BMW 320i	+2.554s	6
3	2	(Italy) Nicola Larini	Alfa Romeo 156 GTA	+4.662s	4
4	61	(United Kingdom) James Hanson	Volvo S60	+7.282s	3
5	42	(Germany) Jörg Müller	BMW 320i	+7.475s	2
6	15	(Spain) Luis Villamil	Alfa Romeo 156 GTA	+10.925s	1
7	10	(Sweden) Fredrik Ekblom	BMW 320i	+14.599s	
8	9	(Netherlands) Peter Kox	BMW 320i	+15.069s	
9	14	(Italy) Paolo Ruberti	Alfa Romeo 156 GTA	+15.436s	
10	16	(France) Eric Cayrolle	Alfa Romeo 156 GTA	+18.940s	
11	11	(Norway) Tommy Rustad	Nissan Primera	+19.602s	
12	7	(Netherlands) Tom Coronel	BMW 320i	+21.139s	
13	20	(United Kingdom) Tom Ferrier	Alfa Romeo 156 GTA	+30.522s	
14	6	(Italy) Fabrizio De Simone	BMW 320i	+31.946s	
15	3	(Italy) Romana Bernardoni	Alfa Romeo 156 GTA	+34.832s	
16	5	(Spain) Jordi Gene	BMW 320i	+35.217s	
17	18	(Italy) Salvatore Tavano	Honda Civic Type-R	+44.412s	
18	19	(Italy) Sandro Sardelli	Honda Civic Type-R	+54.016s	
DNF	60	(Sweden) Rickard Rydell	Volvo S60	+5 laps	
DNF	8	(Italy) Gianni Morbidelli	BMW 320i	+10 laps	

Grid 2

Pos	No	Driver	Car
1	15	(Spain) Luis Villamil	Alfa Romeo 156 GTA
2	42	(Germany) Jörg Müller	BMW 320i
3	61	(United Kingdom) James Hanson	Volvo S60
4	2	(Italy) Nicola Larini	Alfa Romeo 156 GTA
5	43	(Germany) Dirk Müller	BMW 320i
6	1	(Italy) Fabrizio Giovanardi	Alfa Romeo 156 GTA
7	10	(Sweden) Fredrik Ekblom	BMW 320i
8	9	(Netherlands) Peter Kox	BMW 320i
9	14	(Italy) Paolo Ruberti	Alfa Romeo 156 GTA
10	16	(France) Eric Cayrolle	Alfa Romeo 156 GTA
11	11	(Norway) Tommy Rustad	Nissan Primera
12	7	(Netherlands) Tom Coronel	BMW 320i
13	20	(United Kingdom) Tom Ferrier	Alfa Romeo 156 GTA
14	6	(Italy) Fabrizio De Simone	BMW 320i
15	3	(Italy) Romana Bernardoni	Alfa Romeo 156 GTA
16	5	(Spain) Jordi Gene	BMW 320i
17	18	(Italy) Salvatore Tavano	Honda Civic Type-R
18	19	(Italy) Sandro Sardelli	Honda Civic Type-R
19	8	(Italy) Gianni Morbidelli	BMW 320i
20	60	(Sweden) Rickard Rydell	Volvo S60

Race 2

Pos	No	Driver	Constructor	Time/Retired	Points
1	1	(Italy) Fabrizio Giovanardi	Alfa Romeo 156	10 laps in 22:33.028	10
2	43	(Germany) Dirk Müller	BMW 320i	+0.854s	6
3	2	(Italy) Nicola Larini	Alfa Romeo 156	+1.804s	4
4	42	(Germany) Jörg Müller	BMW 320i	+2.733s	3
5	61	(United Kingdom) James Hanson	Volvo S60	+5.820s	2
6	60	(Sweden) Rickard Rydell	Volvo S60	+7.583s	1
7	14	(Italy) Paolo Ruberti	Alfa Romeo 156 GTA	+14.195s	
8	7	(Netherlands) Tom Coronel	BMW 320i	+21.266s	
9	6	(Italy) Fabrizio De Simone	BMW 320i	+23.717s	
10	5	(Spain) Jordi Gene	BMW 320i	+24.756s	
11	16	(France) Eric Cayrolle	Alfa Romeo 156 GTA	+25.602s	
12	20	(United Kingdom) Tom Ferrier	Alfa Romeo 156 GTA	+35.066s	
13	18	(Italy) Salvatore Tavano	Honda Civic Type-R	+38.834s	
14	19	(Italy) Sandro Sardelli	Honda Civic Type-R	+1.21.365s	
15 DNF	11	(Norway) Tommy Rustad	Nissan Primera	+1 lap	
16 DNF	15	(Spain) Luis Villamil	Alfa Romeo 156 GTA	+2 laps	
DNF	10	(Sweden) Fredrik Ekblom	BMW 320i	+4 laps	
DNF	9	(Netherlands) Peter Kox	BMW 320i	+10 laps	
DNF	3	(Italy) Romana Bernardoni	Alfa Romeo 156 GTA	+10 laps	
DNS	8	(Italy) Gianni Morbidelli	BMW 320i		

=== Championship standings after Round 3 ===
Drivers' Championship standings

Pos	Driver	Points
1	(Italy) Fabrizio Giovanardi	56
2	(Italy) Nicola Larini	36
3	(Germany) Dirk Müller	25
4	(Sweden) Rickard Rydell	14
5	(Germany) Jörg Müller	13

Constructors' Championship standings

Pos	Constructor	Points
1	(Italy) Alfa Romeo	93
2	(Germany) BMW	39
3	(Sweden) Volvo	19
4	(Japan) Nissan	0

== Round 4 (Spain) Jarama ==
Qualifying Grid 1

Pos	No	Driver	Car	Lap Time
1	1	(Italy) Fabrizio Giovanardi	Alfa Romeo 156 GTA	1.42.571
2	2	(Italy) Nicola Larini	Alfa Romeo 156 GTA	1.42.676
3	42	(Germany) Jörg Müller	BMW 320i	1.43.290
4	43	(Germany) Dirk Müller	BMW 320i	1.43.291
5	14	(Italy) Paolo Ruberti	Alfa Romeo 156 GTA	1.43.499
6	15	(Spain) Luis Villamil	Alfa Romeo 156 GTA	1.43.900
7	61	(United Kingdom) James Hanson	Volvo S60	1.43.959
8	7	(Netherlands) Tom Coronel	BMW 320i	1.44.057
9	5	(Spain) Jordi Gene	BMW 320i	1.44.069
10	9	(Netherlands) Peter Kox	BMW 320i	1.44.285
11	16	(France) Eric Cayrolle	Alfa Romeo 156 GTA	1.44.425
12	10	(Sweden) Fredrik Ekblom	BMW 320i	1.44.425
13	6	(Italy) Fabrizio De Simone	BMW 320i	1.44.488
14	20	(United Kingdom) Tom Ferrier	Alfa Romeo 156 GTA	1.44.727
15	3	(Italy) Romana Bernardoni	Alfa Romeo 156 GTA	1.44.758
16	8	(Italy) Gianni Morbidelli	BMW 320i	1.45.572
17	11	(Norway) Tommy Rustad	Nissan Primera	1.45.845*
18	60	(Sweden) Rickard Rydell	Volvo S60	1.43.675*
19	18	(Italy) Salvatore Tavano	Honda Civic Type-R	no time

- Rustad and Rydell times disallowed due to engine change

Race 1

Pos	No	Driver	Constructor	Time/Retired	Points
1	1	(Italy) Fabrizio Giovanardi	Alfa Romeo 156 GTA	13 laps in 22:45.870	10
2	2	(Italy) Nicola Larini	Alfa Romeo 156 GTA	+1.154s	6
3	42	(Germany) Jörg Müller	BMW 320i	+2.410s	4
4	43	(Germany) Dirk Müller	BMW 320i	+5.177s	2
5	14	(Italy) Paolo Ruberti	Alfa Romeo 156 GTA	+9.408s	2
6	7	(Netherlands) Tom Coronel	BMW 320i	+14.779s	1
7	9	(Netherlands) Peter Kox	BMW 320i	+15.553s	
8	10	(Sweden) Fredrik Ekblom	BMW 320i	+17.434s	
9	5	(Spain) Jordi Gene	BMW 320i	+18.239s	
10	60	(Sweden) Rickard Rydell	Volvo S60	+25.985s	
11	61	(United Kingdom) James Hanson	Volvo S60	+27.655s	
12	16	(France) Eric Cayrolle	Alfa Romeo 156 GTA	+29.998s	
13	20	(United Kingdom) Tom Ferrier	Alfa Romeo 156 GTA	+33.329s	
14	6	(Italy) Fabrizio De Simone	BMW 320i	+34.888s	
15 DNF	3	(Italy) Romana Bernardoni	Alfa Romeo 156 GTA	+1 lap	
16	8	(Italy) Gianni Morbidelli	BMW 320i	+2 laps	
17 DNF	18	(Italy) Salvatore Tavano	Honda Civic Type-R	+3 laps	
DNF	15	(Spain) Luis Villamil	Alfa Romeo 156 GTA	+12 laps	
DNS	11	(Norway) Tommy Rustad	Nissan Primera		

Grid 2

Pos	No	Driver	Car
1	7	(Netherlands) Tom Coronel	BMW 320i
2	14	(Italy) Paolo Ruberti	Alfa Romeo 156 GTA
3	43	(Germany) Dirk Müller	BMW 320i
4	42	(Germany) Jörg Müller	BMW 320i
5	2	(Italy) Nicola Larini	Alfa Romeo 156 GTA
6	1	(Italy) Fabrizio Giovanardi	Alfa Romeo 156 GTA
7	9	(Netherlands) Peter Kox	BMW 320i
8	10	(Sweden) Fredrik Ekblom	BMW 320i
9	5	(Spain) Jordi Gene	BMW 320i
10	60	(Sweden) Rickard Rydell	Volvo S60
11	61	(United Kingdom) James Hanson	Volvo S60
12	16	(France) Eric Cayrolle	Alfa Romeo 156 GTA
13	20	(United Kingdom) Tom Ferrier	Alfa Romeo 156 GTA
14	6	(Italy) Fabrizio De Simone	BMW 320i
15	8	(Italy) Gianni Morbidelli	BMW 320i
16	18	(Italy) Salvatore Tavano	Honda Civic Type-R
17	15	(Spain) Luis Villamil	Alfa Romeo 156 GTA
18	11	(Norway) Tommy Rustad	Nissan Primera
19	3	(Italy) Romana Bernardoni	Alfa Romeo 156 GTA

Race 2

Pos	No	Driver	Constructor	Time/Retired	Points
1	2	(Italy) Nicola Larini	Alfa Romeo 156	13 laps in 22:44.195	10
2	1	(Italy) Fabrizio Giovanardi	Alfa Romeo 156	+1.838s	6
3	43	(Germany) Dirk Müller	BMW 320i	+2.999s	4
4	42	(Germany) Jörg Müller	BMW 320i	+4.850s	3
5	10	(Sweden) Fredrik Ekblom	BMW 320i	+11.622s	2
6	9	(Netherlands) Peter Kox	BMW 320i	+11.909s	1
7	14	(Italy) Paolo Ruberti	Alfa Romeo 156 GTA	+14.305s	
8	5	(Spain) Jordi Gene	BMW 320i	+15.234s	
9	16	(France) Eric Cayrolle	Alfa Romeo 156 GTA	+19.360s	
10	11	(Norway) Tommy Rustad	Nissan Primera	+58.276s	
11 DNF	61	(United Kingdom) James Hanson	Volvo S60	+1 lap	
12 DNF	3	(Italy) Romana Bernardoni	Alfa Romeo 156 GTA	+2 laps	
13 DNF	20	(United Kingdom) Tom Ferrier	Alfa Romeo 156 GTA	+2 laps	
14 DNF	60	(Sweden) Rickard Rydell	Volvo S60	+4 laps	
DNF	6	(Italy) Fabrizio De Simone	BMW 320i	+6 laps	
DNF	8	(Italy) Gianni Morbidelli	BMW 320i	+10 laps	
DNF	18	(Italy) Salvatore Tavano	Honda Civic Type-R	+10 laps	
DNF	7	(Netherlands) Tom Coronel	BMW 320i	+12 laps	
DNS	15	(Spain) Luis Villamil	Alfa Romeo 156 GTA		

=== Championship standings after Round 4 ===
Drivers' Championship standings

Pos	Driver	Points
1	(Italy) Fabrizio Giovanardi	72
2	(Italy) Nicola Larini	52
3	(Germany) Dirk Müller	32
4	(Germany) Jörg Müller	20
5	(Sweden) Rickard Rydell	14

Constructors' Championship standings

Pos	Constructor	Points
1	(Italy) Alfa Romeo	127
2	(Germany) BMW	57
3	(Sweden) Volvo	19
4	(Japan) Nissan	0

== Championship standings ==
Points system
**1st**	**2nd**	**3rd**	**4th**	**5th**	**6th**
10	6	4	3	2	1

=== Drivers' Championship ===
Pos	Driver	Car	MAG (France)		SIL (United Kingdom)		BRN (Czech Republic)		JAR (Spain)		AND (Sweden)		OSC (Germany)		SPA (Belgium)		PER (Italy)		DON (United Kingdom)		EST (Portugal)		Pts
1	(Italy) Fabrizio Giovanardi	Alfa Romeo	**1**	1	**2**	1	**1**	1	**1**	2	2	4	4	11	5	11†	**1**	1	4	4	1	Ret	122
2	(Germany) Jörg Müller	BMW	5	5	3	8	5	4	3	4	4	1	2	2	2	1	4	3	5	1	4	1	93
3	(Italy) Nicola Larini	Alfa Romeo	2	2	1	2	3	3	2	1	**1**	5	6	**6**	**1**	9	2	4	Ret	DNS	Ret	6	86
4	(Germany) Dirk Müller	BMW	3	3	5	4	2	2	4	3	Ret	6	1	1	Ret	DNS	3	6	**1**	5	Ret	DNS	70
5	(Sweden) Rickard Rydell	Volvo	4	4	4	3	Ret	6	10	14†	3	2	3	3	4	2	10	11	2	Ret	**2**	4	56
6	(Sweden) Fredrik Ekblom	BMW	6	**6**	10	6	7	Ret	8	5	11	3	Ret	9	3	Ret	5	5			Ret	3	21
7	(Netherlands) Tom Coronel	BMW	12	Ret	8	Ret	12	8	6	**Ret**	9	7	**Ret**	8	9	3			7	6	3	2	16
8	(Spain) Jordi Gené	BMW	11	8	Ret	DNS	16	10	9	8	5	9	7	4	Ret	4	8	10	13	3	Ret	14†	12
9	(Netherlands) Duncan Huisman	BMW									18	11			Ret	Ret			6	**2**	Ret	5	9
10	(United Kingdom) James Hanson	Volvo	14	Ret	Ret	Ret	4	5	11	11†	10	Ret	NC	14†	10	6	Ret	DNS	9	Ret	6	**11**	7
11	(Italy) Paolo Ruberti	Alfa Romeo	Ret	DNS	6	**5**	9	7	5	7	15	Ret	12	15†	7	5							7
12	(Italy) Roberto Colciago	Alfa Romeo															15	2	Ret	9			6
13	(Italy) Fabrizio de Simone	BMW	9	9	12	9	14	9	14	Ret	7	14†	5	5	Ret	DNS	6	**Ret**	Ret	DNS	Ret	DNS	5
14	(Italy) Gabriele Tarquini	Alfa Romeo																	3	7			4
15	(Norway) Tommy Rustad	Nissan	Ret	10	11	Ret	11	15†	DNS	10	14	Ret	10	10	11	Ret	16	15	Ret	DNS	5	10	2
16	(Spain) Luis Villamil	Alfa Romeo	7	11	9	7	6	**16**†	Ret	DNS	12	12	8	7	14†	DNS	12	13	11	11	Ret	DNS	1
17	(Netherlands) Peter Kox	BMW	8	Ret	Ret	DNS	8	Ret	7	6	8	8											1
18	(United Kingdom) Tom Ferrier	Alfa Romeo	Ret	14†	Ret	DNS	13	12	13	13†	6	**10**	Ret	DNS	DNS	8	14	14	8	Ret	Ret	7	1
19	(Belgium) Pierre-Yves Corthals	BMW													6	**Ret**			15†	DNS			1
-	(France) Éric Cayrolle	Alfa Romeo	Ret	13†	7	12†	10	11	12	9	13	Ret	9	Ret	8	7	11	9	Ret	Ret	8	8	0
-	(Italy) Salvatore Tavano	Honda	15	12	13	10	17	13	17†	Ret	16	DNS	Ret	12	Ret	DNS	7	7	10	8	Ret	9	0
-	(Italy) Gianni Morbidelli	BMW	10	7	15†	DNS	Ret	DNS	16	Ret													0
-	(Italy) Marco Antonelli	Alfa Romeo																			7	Ret	0
-	(Italy) Gianluca de Lorenzi	BMW															Ret	8					0
-	(Italy) Sandro Sardelli	Honda			DNS	DNS	18	14	DNS	DNS	DNS	DNS	11	Ret	13	10†	9	Ret	12	10			0
-	(Italy) Romana Bernardoni	Alfa Romeo	13	15	14	11	15	Ret	15†	12†	17	13	DNS	13	12	Ret	NC	Ret			9	13†	0
-	(United Kingdom) Rob Collard	Nissan															Ret	DNS	14	12	10	12	0
-	(United Kingdom) Chris Buncombe	Nissan													Ret	12							0
-	(Italy) Domenico Guagliardo	Alfa Romeo															13	12					0
-	(Sweden) Jens Edman	Volvo									19†	DNS											0
-	(Germany) Thomas Klenke	Ford											Ret	Ret									0
-	(United Kingdom) Chris Goodwin	Nissan									Ret	DNS											0
-	(United Kingdom) Iain Inglis	Alfa Romeo																	DNS	DNS			0
Pos	Driver	Car	MAG (France)		SIL (United Kingdom)		BRN (Czech Republic)		JAR (Spain)		AND (Sweden)		OSC (Germany)		SPA (Belgium)		PER (Italy)		DON (United Kingdom)		EST (Portugal)		Pts

Colour	Result
Gold	Winner
Silver	Second place
Bronze	Third place
Green	Points classification
Blue	Non-points classification
Blue	Non-classified finish (NC)
Purple	Retired, not classified (Ret)
Red	Did not qualify (DNQ)
Red	Did not pre-qualify (DNPQ)
Black	Disqualified (DSQ)
White	Did not start (DNS)
White	Withdrew (WD)
White	Race cancelled (C)
Blank	Did not practice (DNP)
Blank	Did not arrive (DNA)
Blank	Excluded (EX)

**Bold** - Pole
Italics - Fastest Lap

† — Drivers did not finish the race, but were classified as they completed over 90% of the race distance.

=== Manufacturers' Trophy ===
Pos	Manufacturer	Points
1	(Italy) Alfa Romeo	217
2	(Germany) BMW	192
3	(Sweden) Volvo	63
4	(Japan) Nissan	2
