= Autodromo del Levante =

Motor racing circuit in Binetto, Apulia, Italy

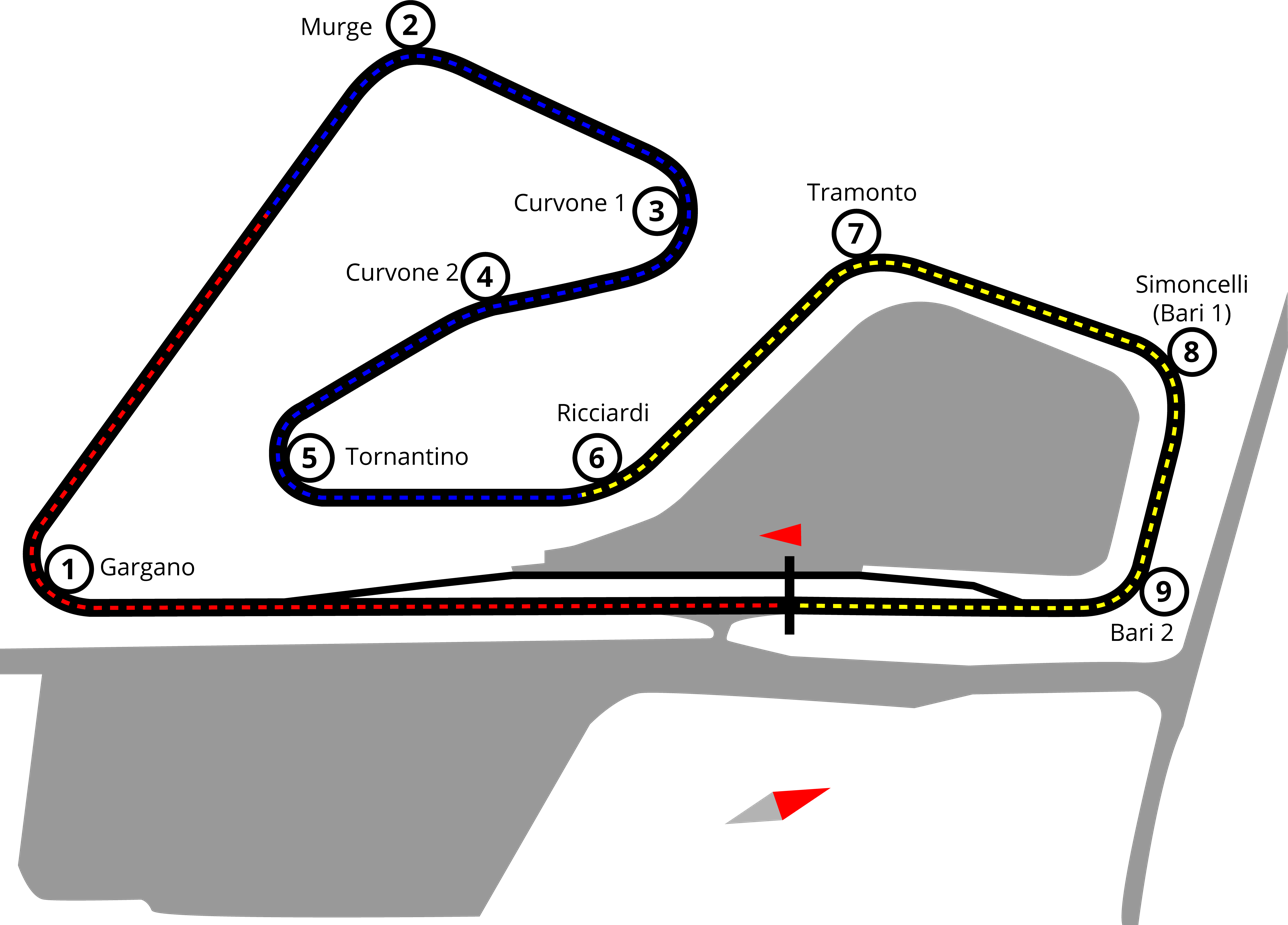
- Full Circuit (1989–present)
- Location: Binetto, Apulia, Italy
- Coordinates: 40°59′41.12″N 16°44′31.32″E
- Capacity: 7,000
- Opened: 10 June 1989; 36 years ago
- Major events: Former: Italian F3 Championship (1990–2000, 2002–2003); Italian Formula Renault Championship (2000–2001); Italian Superturismo Championship (1991–1999, 2001–2003); Italian GT Championship (1993–1994)

Full Circuit (1989–present)
- Length: 1.577 km (0.980 mi)
- Turns: 9
- Race lap record: 0:43.260 ( (Indonesia) Ananda Mikola, Dallara F397, 1998, F3)

Autodromo del Levante is a 1.577 km (0.980 mi) motor racing circuit in Binetto, Apulia, Italy. It was inaugurated on 10 June 1989. The circuit has 9 turns. The circuit was mainly used for national events, such as Italian Formula Three Championship, Italian Superturismo Championship and Italian GT Championship.

== Lap records ==
As of September 2000, the fastest official race lap records at the Autodromo del Levante are listed as:

Category	Time	Driver	Vehicle	Event
Full Circuit (1989–present): 1.577 km (0.980 mi)
Formula Three	0:43.260	Ananda Mikola	Dallara F397	1998 Binetto Italian F3 round
Formula Renault 2.0	0:46.034	Raffaele Giammaria	Tatuus FR2000	2000 Binetto Formula Renault 2000 Italia round
Super Touring	0:47.637	Fabrizio De Simone	BMW 320i	1999 Binetto Italian Superturismo round
Group A	0:48.169	Nicola Larini	Alfa Romeo 155 GTA	1992 Binetto Italian Superturismo round
GT1	0:49.336	Arturo Merzario	Ferrari F40	1994 Binetto Italian GT round
