= Autodromo dell'Umbria =

Motorsport venue in Magione, Italy

Autodromo dell'Umbria Mario Umberto Borzacchini
- Full Circuit (1994–present)
- Location: Magione, Italy
- Coordinates: 43°7′52″N 12°14′22″E
- Broke ground: 1972
- Opened: 7 April 1973; 53 years ago
- Former names: Autodromo di Magione (1973–1979)
- Major events: Former: Italian Superturismo Championship (1987–1999, 2016); NASCAR Whelen Euro Series (2014–2015); Italian F4 (2014); Italian GT (1993–2011); Formula Abarth Italian Championship (2005–2008, 2010); Superstars Series (2005–2009); Euroseries 3000 (2005, 2008); Italian F3 (1974–2004, 2006–2009); Porsche Carrera Cup Italia (2007); Italian Formula Renault Championship (2000–2004)

Full Circuit (1994–present)
- Length: 2.507 km (1.558 mi)
- Turns: 11
- Race lap record: 1:04.796 ( (Italy) Fabio Onidi, Lola B02/50, 2008, F3000)

Original Circuit (1973–1995)
- Length: 1.650 km (1.025 mi)
- Turns: 6
- Race lap record: 0:48.524 ( (Italy) Roberto Colciago, Dallara F389, 1989, F3)

The Autodromo dell'Umbria Mario Umberto Borzacchini is a 2.507 km (1.558 mi) long automobile and motorcycle circuit placed in Magione, Umbria (Italy), about 20 km (12 mi) west of Perugia and 6 km (3.7 mi) east of Lake Trasimeno. It is named after Grand Prix driver Baconin Borzacchini.

== History ==
The construction of the 1.650 km (1.025 mi) long and technically challenging venue began in the spring of 1972 by a group of motorsport enthusiasts (Lorenzo Rondini, Giulio Capolsini, Umberto Mannocchi, Paolo Bietoloni, Gianni Moretti, Francesco Terradura and Giuseppe Tarpani). It held its inaugural race on April 7, 1973, and hosted motorcycle races and races of the Italian Formula Three Championship.

== Lap records ==
As of July 2016, the fastest official race lap records at the Autodromo dell'Umbria are listed as:

Category	Time	Driver	Vehicle	Event
Full Circuit (1994–present): 2.507 km (1.558 mi)
Formula 3000	1:04.796	Fabio Onidi	Lola B02/50	2008 Magione Euroseries 3000 round
Formula Three	1:07.022	Davide Rigon	Dallara F304	2006 Magione Italian F3 round
Formula Abarth	1:07.762	Brandon Maïsano	Tatuus FA010	2010 Magione Formula Abarth round
GT1 (GTS)	1:08.810	Miguel Ramos	Maserati MC12 GT1	2006 Magione Italian GT round
Formula 4	1:08.931	Lance Stroll	Tatuus F4-T014	2014 Magione Italian F4 round
Formula Renault 2.0	1:09.853	Kohei Hirate	Tatuus FR2000	2004 Magione Formula Renault 2000 Italia round
GT2	1:10.185	Richard Lietz	Porsche 911 (997) GT3 RSR	2008 Magione Italian GT round
GT3	1:10.357	Andrea Palma	Ferrari F430 GT3	2010 Magione Italian GT round
Super Touring	1:12.474	Roberto Colciago	Audi A4 Quattro	1999 Magione Italian Superturismo round
Porsche Carrera Cup	1:12.958	Massimo Monti	Porsche 911 (997 I) GT3 Cup	2007 Magione Porsche Carrera Cup Italia round
Stock car racing	1:14.407	Alon Day	Chevrolet SS NASCAR	2015 Magione NASCAR Whelen Euro Series round
TCR Touring Car	1:16.440	Roberto Colciago	Honda Civic Type R TCR (FK2)	2016 Magione ITCC round
Original Circuit (1973–1995): 1.605 km (0.997 mi)
Formula Three	0:48.524	Roberto Colciago	Dallara F389	1989 Magione Italian F3 round
Group 6	0:50.4000	Arcadio Pezzali	Osella PA9	1981 Italian Group 6 race
Group A	0:51.724	Giorgio Francia	Alfa Romeo 155 GTA	1992 Magione Italian Superturismo round
GT1	0:52.211	Oscar Larrauri	Ferrari F40	1994 Magione Italian GT round
Super Touring	0:52.646	Emanuele Pirro	Audi A4 Quattro	1995 Magione Italian Superturismo round
Group 5	0:52.920	"Victor"	Porsche 935	1981 Magione Italian Group 5 race
Group 2	0:59.400	Sergio Rombolotti	Alpine A110	1979 Magione Group 2 race
Group 4	1:01.100	Sergio Rombolotti	Alpine A110	1976 Magione Group 4 race
Group 3	1:04.200	Vittorio Benvenuti	Porsche Carrera RS	1973 Magione GT race
