= 1997 Italian Superturismo Championship =

Seasons
- ← 1996 1998 →

The 1997 Italian Superturismo Championship was the eleventh edition of the Italian Superturismo Championship. The season began in Monza on 20 April and finished in Vallelunga on 12 October, after ten rounds.

== Season summary ==
Emanuele Naspetti and his BMW 320i dominated since the begin of the season achieving an impressive score of 18 podiums (10 victories, 7 seconds and 1 third place) on a total of 20 races.

Naspetti lead the standing since the first round and he won the championship after the first race of 8th round in Varano de Melegari with still 5 races to do; the BMW won the constructors' championship, while Massimo Pigoli took the privateers' trophy in his BMW 320i.

Fabrizio Giovanardi on the wheel of old Alfa Romeo 155 was the main contender with 5 victories but due to a bad start with 4 DNF in the first 8 races, he was not able to fight for the title until the end of the season.

The 1996 Italian Champion Rinaldo Capello and his Audi A4 Quattro were not competitive after FIA decided that Audi had to carry 30kg extra and had to move to FWD from the season 1998.

For these reasons Audi stopped the development of the 4WD and only in wet conditions was Capello able to get a double victory in Varano and one more victory at the slowest track in Binetto.

Beside the top three drivers the championship was animated by the 2 rookies Fabrizio De Simone, Karl Wendlinger, by the return of Antonio Tamburini and by the independent driver Roberto Colciago. Unlike from the previous year, in 1997 it was removed the rules that counted only the 16 best results so all points were valid for the final standing.

== Teams and drivers ==
Team	Car	No.	Drivers	Rounds	Class
(Italy) Audi Sport Italia	Audi A4 Quattro	1	(Italy) Rinaldo Capello	All	
(Italy) Audi Sport Italia	Audi A4 Quattro	2	(Austria) Karl Wendlinger	All	
(Italy) CiBiEmme Engineering	BMW 320i	3	(Italy) Emanuele Naspetti	All	
(Italy) CiBiEmme Engineering	BMW 320i	4	(Italy) Fabrizio de Simone	All	
(Italy) Nordauto Engineering	Alfa Romeo 155 TS	5	(Italy) Fabrizio Giovanardi	All	
(Italy) Nordauto Engineering	Alfa Romeo 155 TS	6	(Italy) Gordon de Adamich	1	
(Italy) Nordauto Engineering	Alfa Romeo 155 TS	6	(Italy) Antonio Tamburini	2-10	
(Italy) EC Motorsport	Honda Accord	21	(Italy) Roberto Colciago	1-7, 9-10	I
(Italy) Effe Touring	Ford Mondeo	22	(Italy) Maurizio Flammini	4	I
(Italy) Soli Racing Team	Alfa Romeo 155 TS	52	(Italy) Moreno Soli	All	P
(Italy) Christy's Team	BMW 320i	53	(Italy) Massimo Pigoli	All	P
(Italy) Varese Corse	Alfa Romeo 155 TS	54	(Italy) Augusto Rossetti	1, 8-10	P
(Italy) Varese Corse	Alfa Romeo 155 TS	54	(Italy) Fabio Severino	9-10	P
(Italy) Varese Corse	Alfa Romeo 155 TS	55	(Italy) Davide Bernasconi	All	P
(Italy) Tecnica Racing Team	Alfa Romeo 155 TS	56	(Italy) Felice Tedeschi	1-4	P
(Italy) Tecnica Racing Team	Alfa Romeo 155 TS	57	(Italy) Sandro Montani	1-5, 8-10	P
(Italy) Tecno Racing	BMW 320i	58	(Italy) Maurizio Lusuardi	1-2, 5, 7-10	P
(Italy) Tecno Racing	BMW 320i	58	(Italy) Stefano Gabellini	1-2, 4-5, 7-10	P
(Italy) Promo Racing	Alfa Romeo 155 TS	59	(Italy) Lorenzo Falessi	1-3, 5, 10	P
(Italy) Romano Racing	Opel Vectra Gt	61	(Italy) Emanuele Moncini	6	P
(Italy) Greyhound Motorsport	Ford Mondeo	63	(Italy) Gianluca Roda	1	P
(Italy) Greyhound Motorsport	Opel Vectra 16v	63	(Italy) Gianluca Roda	2-10	P
(Italy) Romano Racing	Opel Vectra Gt	64	(Italy) Sandro Sardelli	1-5, 8-10	P
(Italy) Scuderia Giudici	Alfa Romeo 155 TS	65	(Italy) Gianni Giudici	9	P
(Italy) Capannelle Racing	Opel Vectra	67	(Italy) Sergio Sambataro	10	P

Icon	Class
I	Not eligible to score points in the Manufactures Trophy
P	Private Drivers

=== Drivers changes ===
Changed Cars

- Roberto Colciago: Alfa Romeo 155 → Honda Accord

Entering Superturismo 1997

- Karl Wendlinger: STW → Audi A4 Quattro
- Fabrizio De Simone: F1 Test Driver → BMW 320i
- Antonio Tamburini: No full-time drive → Alfa Romeo 155

Leaving Superturismo 1997

- Yvan Muller: → STW
- Johnny Cecotto: → STW
- Gianni Morbidelli: → F1

== Race calendar and results ==
Round		Circuit	Date	Pole position	Fastest lap	Winning driver	Winning team
1	R1	(Italy) Autodromo Nazionale Monza	20 April	(Italy) Emanuele Naspetti	(Italy) Emanuele Naspetti	(Italy) Emanuele Naspetti	(Italy) CiBiEmme Engineering
1	R2	(Italy) Autodromo Nazionale Monza	20 April		(Italy) Fabrizio de Simone	(Italy) Emanuele Naspetti	(Italy) CiBiEmme Engineering
2	R1	(Italy) Autodromo Internazionale del Mugello	4 May	(Italy) Fabrizio Giovanardi	(Italy) Emanuele Naspetti	(Italy) Emanuele Naspetti	(Italy) CiBiEmme Engineering
2	R2	(Italy) Autodromo Internazionale del Mugello	4 May		(Italy) Fabrizio Giovanardi	(Italy) Fabrizio Giovanardi	(Italy) Nordauto Engineering
3	R1	(Italy) Autodromo di Magione	18 May	(Italy) Fabrizio de Simone	(Italy) Fabrizio de Simone	(Italy) Emanuele Naspetti	(Italy) CiBiEmme Engineering
3	R2	(Italy) Autodromo di Magione	18 May		(Italy) Emanuele Naspetti	(Italy) Emanuele Naspetti	(Italy) CiBiEmme Engineering
4	R1	(Italy) Autodromo Enzo e Dino Ferrari	8 June	(Italy) Fabrizio Giovanardi	(Italy) Emanuele Naspetti	(Italy) Fabrizio Giovanardi	(Italy) Nordauto Engineering
4	R2	(Italy) Autodromo Enzo e Dino Ferrari	8 June		(Italy) Emanuele Naspetti	(Italy) Emanuele Naspetti	(Italy) CiBiEmme Engineering
5	R1	(Italy) Autodromo Enzo e Dino Ferrari	22 June	(Italy) Antonio Tamburini	(Italy) Fabrizio de Simone	(Italy) Antonio Tamburini	(Italy) Nordauto Engineering
5	R2	(Italy) Autodromo Enzo e Dino Ferrari	22 June		(Italy) Emanuele Naspetti	(Italy) Emanuele Naspetti	(Italy) CiBiEmme Engineering
6	R1	(Italy) Autodromo del Levante	6 July	(Italy) Rinaldo Capello	(Italy) Emanuele Naspetti	(Italy) Emanuele Naspetti	(Italy) CiBiEmme Engineering
6	R2	(Italy) Autodromo del Levante	6 July		(Italy) Emanuele Naspetti	(Italy) Rinaldo Capello	(Italy) Audi Sport Italia
7	R1	(Italy) Autodromo di Pergusa	31 August	(Italy) Fabrizio Giovanardi	(Italy) Fabrizio de Simone	(Italy) Fabrizio Giovanardi	(Italy) Nordauto Engineering
7	R2	(Italy) Autodromo di Pergusa	31 August		(Italy) Fabrizio Giovanardi	(Italy) Fabrizio Giovanardi	(Italy) Nordauto Engineering
8	R1	(Italy) Autodromo Riccardo Paletti	14 September	(Italy) Antonio Tamburini	(Italy) Fabrizio Giovanardi	(Italy) Rinaldo Capello	(Italy) Audi Sport Italia
8	R2	(Italy) Autodromo Riccardo Paletti	14 September		(Italy) Fabrizio Giovanardi	(Italy) Rinaldo Capello	(Italy) Audi Sport Italia
9	R1	(Italy) Circuito Internazionale Misano	28 September	(Italy) Fabrizio Giovanardi	(Italy) Emanuele Naspetti	(Italy) Emanuele Naspetti	(Italy) CiBiEmme Engineering
9	R2	(Italy) Circuito Internazionale Misano	28 September		(Italy) Fabrizio de Simone	(Italy) Emanuele Naspetti	(Italy) CiBiEmme Engineering
10	R1	(Italy) ACI Vallelunga Circuit	12 October	(Italy) Fabrizio Giovanardi	(Italy) Fabrizio Giovanardi	(Italy) Fabrizio Giovanardi	(Italy) Nordauto Engineering
10	R2	(Italy) ACI Vallelunga Circuit	12 October		(Italy) Fabrizio Giovanardi	(Italy) Fabrizio de Simone	(Italy) CiBiEmme Engineering

== Round 1 (Italy) Monza ==
Qualifying

Pos	No	Driver	Car	Lap Time	Super Pole
1	3	(Italy) Emanuele Naspetti	BMW 320i	1.53.148	SP
2	4	(Italy) Fabrizio De Simone	BMW 320i	1.53.264	SP
3	21	(Italy) Roberto Colciago	Honda Accord	1.53.627	SP
4	5	(Italy) Fabrizio Giovanardi	Alfa Romeo 155	1.53.665	SP
5	1	(Italy) Rinaldo Capello	Audi A4 Quattro	1.54.197	SP
6	2	(Austria) Karl Wendlinger	Audi A4 Quattro	1.54.702	SP
7	6	(Italy) Gordon De Adamich	Alfa Romeo 155	1.56.258	SP
8	53	(Italy) Massimo Pigoli	BMW 320i	1.57.203	SP
9	64	(Italy) Sandro Sardelli	Opel Vectra GT	1.59.714	SP
10	58	(Italy) Maurizio Lusuardi	BMW 320i	2.02.275	SP
10	58	(Italy) Stefano Gabellini	BMW 320i	2.02.275	SP
11	54	(Italy) Augusto Rossetti	Alfa Romeo 155	1.59.477	
12	52	(Italy) Moreno Soli	Alfa Romeo 155	1.59.708	
13	56	(Italy) Felice Tedeschi	Alfa Romeo 155	2.01.010	
14	63	(Italy) Gianluca Roda	Ford Mondeo	2.01.526	
15	55	(Italy) Davide Bernasconi	Alfa Romeo 155	2.02.912	
16	57	(Italy) Sandro Montani	Alfa Romeo 155	2.03.562	
17	59	(Italy) Lorenzo Falessi	Alfa Romeo 155	2.02.912	

Race 1

Pos	No	Driver	Constructor	Time/Retired	Points
1	3	(Italy) Emanuele Naspetti	BMW 320i	15 laps in 28:53.256	20
2	1	(Italy) Rinaldo Capello	Audi A4 Quattro	+3.786s	15
3	2	(Austria) Karl Wendlinger	Audi A4 Quattro	+19.694s	12
4	6	(Italy) Gordon De Adamich	Alfa Romeo 155	+48.513s	10
5	53	(Italy) Massimo Pigoli	BMW 320i	+54.826s	8
6	64	(Italy) Sandro Sardelli	Opel Vectra GT	+1.07.149s	6
7	56	(Italy) Felice Tedeschi	Alfa Romeo 155	+1.49.141s	4
8	63	(Italy) Gianluca Roda	Ford Mondeo	+1.50.754s	3
9	57	(Italy) Sandro Montani	Alfa Romeo 155	+1 lap	2
10	55	(Italy) Davide Bernasconi	Alfa Romeo 155	+1 lap	1
11	59	(Italy) Lorenzo Falessi	Alfa Romeo 155	+1 lap	
12	54	(Italy) Augusto Rossetti	Alfa Romeo 155	+2 laps	
DNF	4	(Italy) Fabrizio De Simone	BMW 320i	+11 laps	
DNF	21	(Italy) Roberto Colciago	Honda Accord	+11 laps	
DNF	5	(Italy) Fabrizio Giovanardi	Alfa Romeo 155	+14 laps	
DNF	52	(Italy) Moreno Soli	Alfa Romeo 155	+14 laps	
DNF	58	(Italy) Maurizio Lusuardi	BMW 320i	+15 laps	

Race 2

Pos	No	Driver	Constructor	Time/Retired	Points
1	3	(Italy) Emanuele Naspetti	BMW 320i	15 laps in 28:59.658	20
2	21	(Italy) Roberto Colciago	Honda Accord	+3.370s	15
3	4	(Italy) Fabrizio De Simone	BMW 320i	+11.462s	12
4	2	(Austria) Karl Wendlinger	Audi A4 Quattro	+12.103s	10
5	53	(Italy) Massimo Pigoli	BMW 320i	+1.03.057s	8
6	52	(Italy) Moreno Soli	Alfa Romeo 155	+1.35.079s	6
7	54	(Italy) Augusto Rossetti	Alfa Romeo 155	+1.50.678s	4
8	55	(Italy) Davide Bernasconi	Alfa Romeo 155	+2.02.288s	3
9	57	(Italy) Sandro Montani	Alfa Romeo 155	+1 lap	2
10	59	(Italy) Lorenzo Falessi	Alfa Romeo 155	+1 lap	1
11 DNF	64	(Italy) Sandro Sardelli	Opel Vectra GT	+5 laps	
12 DNF	1	(Italy) Rinaldo Capello	Audi A4 Quattro	+6 laps	
13 DNF	63	(Italy) Gianluca Roda	Ford Mondeo	+7 laps	
DNF	6	(Italy) Gordon De Adamich	Alfa Romeo 155	+10 laps	
DNF	56	(Italy) Felice Tedeschi	Alfa Romeo 155	+15 laps	
DNS	5	(Italy) Fabrizio Giovanardi	Alfa Romeo 155		
DNS	58	(Italy) Stefano Gabellini	BMW 320i		

=== Championship standings after Round 1 ===
Drivers' Championship standings

Pos	Driver	Points
1	(Italy) Emanuele Naspetti	40
2	(Austria) Karl Wendlinger	22
3	(Italy) Massimo Pigoli	16
4	(Italy) Roberto Colciago	15
5	(Italy) Rinaldo Capello	15

Constructors' Championship standings

Pos	Constructor	Points
1	(Germany) BMW	73
2	(Italy) Alfa Romeo	40
3	(Germany) Audi	39
4	(Germany) Opel	7
5	(United States) Ford	3

== Round 2 (Italy) Mugello ==
Qualifying

Pos	No	Driver	Car	Lap Time	Super Pole
1	5	(Italy) Fabrizio Giovanardi	Alfa Romeo 155	1.57.137	SP
2	4	(Italy) Fabrizio De Simone	BMW 320i	1.57.496	SP
3	3	(Italy) Emanuele Naspetti	BMW 320i	1.57.527	SP
4	6	(Italy) Antonio Tamburini	Alfa Romeo 155	1.57.967	SP
5	21	(Italy) Roberto Colciago	Honda Accord	1.58.235	SP
6	1	(Italy) Rinaldo Capello	Audi A4 Quattro	1.58.758	SP
7	2	(Austria) Karl Wendlinger	Audi A4 Quattro	1.59.624	SP
8	64	(Italy) Sandro Sardelli	Opel Vectra GT	2.02.479	SP
9	53	(Italy) Massimo Pigoli	BMW 320i	2.02.941	SP
10	52	(Italy) Moreno Soli	Alfa Romeo 155	2.02.991	SP
11	56	(Italy) Felice Tedeschi	Alfa Romeo 155	2.02.107	
12	63	(Italy) Gianluca Roda	Opel Vectra 16v	2.01.526	
13	58	(Italy) Maurizio Lusuardi	BMW 320i	2.02.793	
13	58	(Italy) Stefano Gabellini	BMW 320i	2.02.793	
14	57	(Italy) Sandro Montani	Alfa Romeo 155	2.03.495	
15	55	(Italy) Davide Bernasconi	Alfa Romeo 155	2.04.893	
16	59	(Italy) Lorenzo Falessi	Alfa Romeo 155	2.09.555	

Race 1

Pos	No	Driver	Constructor	Time/Retired	Points
1	3	(Italy) Emanuele Naspetti	BMW 320i	15 laps in 30:16.633	20
2	21	(Italy) Roberto Colciago	Honda Accord	+5.219s	15
3	2	(Austria) Karl Wendlinger	Audi A4 Quattro	+6.452s	12
4	6	(Italy) Antonio Tamburini	Alfa Romeo 155	+13.744s	10
5	5	(Italy) Fabrizio Giovanardi	Alfa Romeo 155	+1.04.397s	8
6	63	(Italy) Gianluca Roda	Opel Vectra 16v	+1.21.301s	6
7	56	(Italy) Felice Tedeschi	Alfa Romeo 155	+1.25.636s	4
8	58	(Italy) Stefano Gabellini	BMW 320i	+1.40.071s	3
9	52	(Italy) Moreno Soli	Alfa Romeo 155	+1 lap	2
10	55	(Italy) Davide Bernasconi	Alfa Romeo 155	+1 lap	1
11 DNF	59	(Italy) Lorenzo Falessi	Alfa Romeo 155	+6 laps	
12 DNF	57	(Italy) Sandro Montani	Alfa Romeo 155	+6 lap	
DNF	1	(Italy) Rinaldo Capello	Audi A4 Quattro	+9 laps	
DNF	4	(Italy) Fabrizio De Simone	BMW 320i	+9 laps	
DNF	64	(Italy) Sandro Sardelli	Opel Vectra GT	+14 laps	
DNF	53	(Italy) Massimo Pigoli	BMW 320i	+15 laps	

Race 2

Pos	No	Driver	Constructor	Time/Retired	Points
1	5	(Italy) Fabrizio Giovanardi	Alfa Romeo 155	15 laps in 30:11.620	20
2	3	(Italy) Emanuele Naspetti	BMW 320i	+6.190s	15
3	6	(Italy) Antonio Tamburini	Alfa Romeo 155	+9.103s	12
4	2	(Austria) Karl Wendlinger	Audi A4 Quattro	+15.697s	10
5	52	(Italy) Moreno Soli	Alfa Romeo 155	+1.23.971s	8
6	57	(Italy) Sandro Montani	Alfa Romeo 155	+1.42.240s	6
7	4	(Italy) Fabrizio De Simone	BMW 320i	+1.48.750s	4
8	58	(Italy) Maurizio Lusuardi	BMW 320i	+1.50.477s	3
9	56	(Italy) Felice Tedeschi	Alfa Romeo 155	+1.50.940s	2
10	55	(Italy) Davide Bernasconi	Alfa Romeo 155	+1.53.791s	1
11	59	(Italy) Lorenzo Falessi	Alfa Romeo 155	+1 lap	
12 DNF	1	(Italy) Rinaldo Capello	Audi A4 Quattro	+4 laps	
13 DNF	53	(Italy) Massimo Pigoli	BMW 320i	+7 laps	
DNF	21	(Italy) Roberto Colciago	Honda Accord	+13 laps	
DNF	63	(Italy) Gianluca Roda	Opel Vectra 16v	+13 laps	
DNS	64	(Italy) Sandro Sardelli	Opel Vectra GT	+5 laps	

=== Championship standings after Round 2 ===
Drivers' Championship standings

Pos	Driver	Points
1	(Italy) Emanuele Naspetti	75
2	(Austria) Karl Wendlinger	44
3	(Italy) Roberto Colciago	30
4	(Italy) Fabrizio Giovanardi	28
5	(Italy) Antonio Tamburini	22

Constructors' Championship standings

Pos	Constructor	Points
1	(Italy) Alfa Romeo	123
2	(Germany) BMW	119
3	(Germany) Audi	64
4	(Germany) Opel	13
5	(United States) Ford	3

== Round 3 (Italy) Magione ==
Qualifying

Pos	No	Driver	Car	Lap Time	Super Pole
1	4	(Italy) Fabrizio De Simone	BMW 320i	1.13.812	SP
2	2	(Austria) Karl Wendlinger	Audi A4 Quattro	1.13.951	SP
3	3	(Italy) Emanuele Naspetti	BMW 320i	1.14.002	SP
4	1	(Italy) Rinaldo Capello	Audi A4 Quattro	1.14.121	SP
5	21	(Italy) Roberto Colciago	Honda Accord	1.14.592	SP
6	6	(Italy) Antonio Tamburini	Alfa Romeo 155	1.14.875	SP
7	5	(Italy) Fabrizio Giovanardi	Alfa Romeo 155	1.15.008	SP
8	64	(Italy) Sandro Sardelli	Opel Vectra GT	1.15.986	SP
9	53	(Italy) Massimo Pigoli	BMW 320i	1.16.763	SP
10	56	(Italy) Felice Tedeschi	Alfa Romeo 155	1.17.718	SP
11	52	(Italy) Moreno Soli	Alfa Romeo 155	1.16.353	
12	57	(Italy) Sandro Montani	Alfa Romeo 155	1.16.589	
13	63	(Italy) Gianluca Roda	Opel Vectra 16v	1.16.908	
14	55	(Italy) Davide Bernasconi	Alfa Romeo 155	1.17.685	
15	59	(Italy) Lorenzo Falessi	Alfa Romeo 155	1.19.200	

Race 1

Pos	No	Driver	Constructor	Time/Retired	Points
1	3	(Italy) Emanuele Naspetti	BMW 320i	24 laps in 29:59.614	20
2	4	(Italy) Fabrizio De Simone	BMW 320i	+0.653s	15
3	21	(Italy) Roberto Colciago	Honda Accord	+9.982s	12
4	6	(Italy) Antonio Tamburini	Alfa Romeo 155	+11.309s	10
5	1	(Italy) Rinaldo Capello	Audi A4 Quattro	+54.618s	8
6	53	(Italy) Massimo Pigoli	BMW 320i	+59.526s	6
7	64	(Italy) Sandro Sardelli	Opel Vectra GT	+1.08.740s	4
8	52	(Italy) Moreno Soli	Alfa Romeo 155	+1.18.571s	3
9	63	(Italy) Gianluca Roda	Opel Vectra 16v	+1 lap	2
10	57	(Italy) Sandro Montani	Alfa Romeo 155	+1 lap	1
11	55	(Italy) Davide Bernasconi	Alfa Romeo 155	+1 lap	
12	59	(Italy) Lorenzo Falessi	Alfa Romeo 155	+1 lap	
13 DNF	56	(Italy) Felice Tedeschi	Alfa Romeo 155	+12 laps	
DNF	5	(Italy) Fabrizio Giovanardi	Alfa Romeo 155	+14 laps	
DNF	2	(Austria) Karl Wendlinger	Audi A4 Quattro	+15 laps	

Race 2

Pos	No	Driver	Constructor	Time/Retired	Points
1	3	(Italy) Emanuele Naspetti	BMW 320i	24 laps in 29:46.864	20
2	4	(Italy) Fabrizio De Simone	BMW 320i	+2.953s	15
3	1	(Italy) Rinaldo Capello	Audi A4 Quattro	+3.650s	12
4	6	(Italy) Antonio Tamburini	Alfa Romeo 155	+21.306s	10
5	5	(Italy) Fabrizio Giovanardi	Alfa Romeo 155	+34.579s	8
6	53	(Italy) Massimo Pigoli	BMW 320i	+59.324s	6
7	64	(Italy) Sandro Sardelli	Opel Vectra GT	+1.13.727s	4
8	57	(Italy) Sandro Montani	Alfa Romeo 155	+1 lap	3
9	55	(Italy) Davide Bernasconi	Alfa Romeo 155	+1 lap	2
10	52	(Italy) Moreno Soli	Alfa Romeo 155	+1 lap	1
11	59	(Italy) Lorenzo Falessi	Alfa Romeo 155	+2 laps	
12 DNF	21	(Italy) Roberto Colciago	Honda Accord	+12 laps	
DNF	63	(Italy) Gianluca Roda	Opel Vectra 16v	+13 laps	
DNF	2	(Austria) Karl Wendlinger	Audi A4 Quattro	+18 laps	
DNS	56	(Italy) Felice Tedeschi	Alfa Romeo 155		

=== Championship standings after Round 3 ===
Drivers' Championship standings

Pos	Driver	Points
1	(Italy) Emanuele Naspetti	115
2	(Italy) Fabrizio De Simone	46
3	(Austria) Karl Wendlinger	44
4	(Italy) Roberto Colciago	42
5	(Italy) Antonio Tamburini	42

Constructors' Championship standings

Pos	Constructor	Points
1	(Germany) BMW	203
2	(Italy) Alfa Romeo	166
3	(Germany) Audi	86
4	(Germany) Opel	26
5	(United States) Ford	3

== Round 4 (Italy) Imola ==
Qualifying

Pos	No	Driver	Car	Lap Time	Super Pole
1	5	(Italy) Fabrizio Giovanardi	Alfa Romeo 155	1.56.993	SP
2	6	(Italy) Antonio Tamburini	Alfa Romeo 155	1.57.397	SP
3	3	(Italy) Emanuele Naspetti	BMW 320i	1.57.481	SP
4	4	(Italy) Fabrizio De Simone	BMW 320i	1.58.171	SP
5	2	(Austria) Karl Wendlinger	Audi A4 Quattro	1.58.394	SP
6	1	(Italy) Rinaldo Capello	Audi A4 Quattro	1.58.411	SP
7	53	(Italy) Massimo Pigoli	BMW 320i	2.02.537	SP
8	58	(Italy) Stefano Gabellini	BMW 320i	2.02.827	SP
9	52	(Italy) Moreno Soli	Alfa Romeo 155	2.03.762	SP
10	64	(Italy) Sandro Sardelli	Opel Vectra GT	2.05.243	SP
11	63	(Italy) Gianluca Roda	Opel Vectra 16v	2.01.601	
12	56	(Italy) Felice Tedeschi	Alfa Romeo 155	2.01.676	
13	57	(Italy) Sandro Montani	Alfa Romeo 155	2.03.288	
14	55	(Italy) Davide Bernasconi	Alfa Romeo 155	2.03.870	
15	22	(Italy) Maurizio Flammini	Ford Mondeo	2.05.116	
16	21	(Italy) Roberto Colciago	Honda Accord	no time	

Race 1

Pos	No	Driver	Constructor	Time/Retired	Points
1	5	(Italy) Fabrizio Giovanardi	Alfa Romeo 155	16 laps in 31:56.603	20
2	3	(Italy) Emanuele Naspetti	BMW 320i	+3.891s	15
3	4	(Italy) Fabrizio De Simone	BMW 320i	+4.211s	12
4	1	(Italy) Rinaldo Capello	Audi A4 Quattro	+5.017s	10
5	21	(Italy) Roberto Colciago	Honda Accord	+16.049s	8
6	2	(Austria) Karl Wendlinger	Audi A4 Quattro	+20.944s	6
7	53	(Italy) Massimo Pigoli	BMW 320i	+1.02.186s	4
8	52	(Italy) Moreno Soli	Alfa Romeo 155	+1.17.377s	3
9	64	(Italy) Sandro Sardelli	Opel Vectra GT	+1.20.630s	2
10	63	(Italy) Gianluca Roda	Opel Vectra 16v	+1.45.077s	1
11	6	(Italy) Antonio Tamburini	Alfa Romeo 155	+1 lap	
12	55	(Italy) Davide Bernasconi	Alfa Romeo 155	+1 lap	
13 DNF	56	(Italy) Felice Tedeschi	Alfa Romeo 155	+2 laps	
14 DNF	57	(Italy) Sandro Montani	Alfa Romeo 155	+2 laps	
DNF	58	(Italy) Stefano Gabellini	BMW 320i	+10 laps	
DNS	22	(Italy) Maurizio Flammini	Ford Mondeo		

Race 2

Pos	No	Driver	Constructor	Time/Retired	Points
1	3	(Italy) Emanuele Naspetti	BMW 320i	16 laps in 31:50.571	20
2	1	(Italy) Rinaldo Capello	Audi A4 Quattro	+2.630s	15
3	4	(Italy) Fabrizio De Simone	BMW 320i	+12.042s	12
4	6	(Italy) Antonio Tamburini	Alfa Romeo 155	+16.939s	10
5	21	(Italy) Roberto Colciago	Honda Accord	+24.692s	8
6	2	(Austria) Karl Wendlinger	Audi A4 Quattro	+37.436s	6
7	53	(Italy) Massimo Pigoli	BMW 320i	+1.03.564s	4
8	52	(Italy) Moreno Soli	Alfa Romeo 155	+1.19.954s	3
9	64	(Italy) Sandro Sardelli	Opel Vectra GT	+1.34.971s	2
10	63	(Italy) Gianluca Roda	Opel Vectra 16v	+1.34.971s	1
11	57	(Italy) Sandro Montani	Alfa Romeo 155	+1.49.920s	
12	55	(Italy) Davide Bernasconi	Alfa Romeo 155	+1 lap	
DNF	58	(Italy) Stefano Gabellini	BMW 320i	+11 laps	
DNF	5	(Italy) Fabrizio Giovanardi	Alfa Romeo 155	+16 laps	
DNS	56	(Italy) Felice Tedeschi	Alfa Romeo 155		
DNS	22	(Italy) Maurizio Flammini	Ford Mondeo		

=== Championship standings after Round 4 ===
Drivers' Championship standings

Pos	Driver	Points
1	(Italy) Emanuele Naspetti	150
2	(Italy) Fabrizio De Simone	70
3	(Italy) Rinaldo Capello	60
4	(Italy) Roberto Colciago	58
5	(Italy) Fabrizio Giovanardi	56

Constructors' Championship standings

Pos	Constructor	Points
1	(Germany) BMW	274
2	(Italy) Alfa Romeo	206
3	(Germany) Audi	127
4	(Germany) Opel	36
5	(United States) Ford	3

== Round 5 (Italy) Imola ==
Qualifying

Pos	No	Driver	Car	Lap Time	Super Pole
1	6	(Italy) Antonio Tamburini	Alfa Romeo 155	1.57.001	SP
2	21	(Italy) Roberto Colciago	Honda Accord	1.57.175	SP
3	5	(Italy) Fabrizio Giovanardi	Alfa Romeo 155	1.57.464	SP
4	1	(Italy) Rinaldo Capello	Audi A4 Quattro	1.57.495	SP
5	4	(Italy) Fabrizio De Simone	BMW 320i	1.57.545	SP
6	3	(Italy) Emanuele Naspetti	BMW 320i	1.57.552	SP
7	2	(Austria) Karl Wendlinger	Audi A4 Quattro	1.58.767	SP
8	53	(Italy) Massimo Pigoli	BMW 320i	2.00.435	SP
9	63	(Italy) Gianluca Roda	Opel Vectra 16v	2.01.823	SP
10	64	(Italy) Sandro Sardelli	Opel Vectra GT	2.01.860	SP
11	57	(Italy) Sandro Montani	Alfa Romeo 155	2.01.983	
12	58	(Italy) Maurizio Lusuardi	BMW 320i	2.02.226	
12	58	(Italy) Stefano Gabellini	BMW 320i	2.02.226	
13	52	(Italy) Moreno Soli	Alfa Romeo 155	2.02.281	
14	55	(Italy) Davide Bernasconi	Alfa Romeo 155	2.04.848	
15	59	(Italy) Lorenzo Falessi	Alfa Romeo 155	2.06.255	

Race 1

Pos	No	Driver	Constructor	Time/Retired	Points
1	6	(Italy) Antonio Tamburini	Alfa Romeo 155	16 laps in 32:06.319	20
2	3	(Italy) Emanuele Naspetti	BMW 320i	+0.131s	15
3	2	(Austria) Karl Wendlinger	Audi A4 Quattro	+2.015s	12
4	1	(Italy) Rinaldo Capello	Audi A4 Quattro	+23.583s	10
5	53	(Italy) Massimo Pigoli	BMW 320i	+49.368s	8
6	64	(Italy) Sandro Sardelli	Opel Vectra GT	+53.371s	6
7	58	(Italy) Maurizio Lusuardi	BMW 320i	+1.18.417s	4
8	5	(Italy) Fabrizio Giovanardi	Alfa Romeo 155	+1.18.794s	3
9	57	(Italy) Sandro Montani	Alfa Romeo 155	+1.27.315s	2
10	52	(Italy) Moreno Soli	Alfa Romeo 155	+1.32.731s	1
11	55	(Italy) Davide Bernasconi	Alfa Romeo 155	+1.33.006s	
12	59	(Italy) Lorenzo Falessi	Alfa Romeo 155	+1 lap	
DSQ	4	(Italy) Fabrizio De Simone	BMW 320i	+2 laps	
DNF	21	(Italy) Roberto Colciago	Honda Accord	+4 laps	
DNF	63	(Italy) Gianluca Roda	Opel Vectra 16v	+7 laps	

Race 2

Pos	No	Driver	Constructor	Time/Retired	Points
1	3	(Italy) Emanuele Naspetti	BMW 320i	16 laps in 31:51.853	20
2	5	(Italy) Fabrizio Giovanardi	Alfa Romeo 155	+0.658s	15
3	1	(Italy) Rinaldo Capello	Audi A4 Quattro	+9.687s	12
4	4	(Italy) Fabrizio De Simone	BMW 320i	+19.123s	10
5	6	(Italy) Antonio Tamburini	Alfa Romeo 155	+21.104s	8
6	21	(Italy) Roberto Colciago	Honda Accord	+22.816s	6
7	2	(Austria) Karl Wendlinger	Audi A4 Quattro	+25.761s	4
8	53	(Italy) Massimo Pigoli	BMW 320i	+1.10.204s	3
9	58	(Italy) Stefano Gabellini	BMW 320i	+1.38.580s	2
10	55	(Italy) Davide Bernasconi	Alfa Romeo 155	+1.40.076s	1
11	63	(Italy) Gianluca Roda	Opel Vectra 16v	+1.47.736s	
12	52	(Italy) Moreno Soli	Alfa Romeo 155	+1.55.244s	
13 DNF	59	(Italy) Lorenzo Falessi	Alfa Romeo 155	+6 laps	
DNF	57	(Italy) Sandro Montani	Alfa Romeo 155	+12 laps	
DNF	64	(Italy) Sandro Sardelli	Opel Vectra GT	+15 laps	

=== Championship standings after Round 5 ===
Drivers' Championship standings

Pos	Driver	Points
1	(Italy) Emanuele Naspetti	185
2	(Italy) Rinaldo Capello	82
3	(Italy) Fabrizio De Simone	80
4	(Italy) Antonio Tamburini	80
5	(Italy) Fabrizio Giovanardi	74

Constructors' Championship standings

Pos	Constructor	Points
1	(Germany) BMW	338
2	(Italy) Alfa Romeo	257
3	(Germany) Audi	167
4	(Germany) Opel	43
5	(United States) Ford	3

== Round 6 (Italy) Binetto ==
Qualifying

Pos	No	Driver	Car	Lap Time	Super Pole
1	1	(Italy) Rinaldo Capello	Audi A4 Quattro	47.526	SP
2	5	(Italy) Fabrizio Giovanardi	Alfa Romeo 155	47.760	SP
3	3	(Italy) Emanuele Naspetti	BMW 320i	47.809	SP
4	6	(Italy) Antonio Tamburini	Alfa Romeo 155	47.935	SP
5	4	(Italy) Fabrizio De Simone	BMW 320i	47.996	SP
6	2	(Austria) Karl Wendlinger	Audi A4 Quattro	48.282	SP
7	21	(Italy) Roberto Colciago	Honda Accord	48.343	SP
8	53	(Italy) Massimo Pigoli	BMW 320i	49.696	SP
9	63	(Italy) Gianluca Roda	Opel Vectra 16v	49.930	SP
10	52	(Italy) Moreno Soli	Alfa Romeo 155	49.987	SP
11	61	(Italy) Emanuele Moncini	Opel Vectra GT	50.183	
12	55	(Italy) Davide Bernasconi	Alfa Romeo 155	50.464	

Race 1

Pos	No	Driver	Constructor	Time/Retired	Points
1	3	(Italy) Emanuele Naspetti	BMW 320i	34 laps in 27:44.350	20
2	1	(Italy) Rinaldo Capello	Audi A4 Quattro	+0.848s	15
3	2	(Austria) Karl Wendlinger	Audi A4 Quattro	+15.300s	12
4	5	(Italy) Fabrizio Giovanardi	Alfa Romeo 155	+26.536s	10
5	53	(Italy) Massimo Pigoli	BMW 320i	+1 lap	8
6	52	(Italy) Moreno Soli	Alfa Romeo 155	+1 lap	6
7	63	(Italy) Gianluca Roda	Opel Vectra 16v	+1 lap	4
8	55	(Italy) Davide Bernasconi	Alfa Romeo 155	+2 laps	3
9 DNF	61	(Italy) Emanuele Moncini	Opel Vectra GT	+6 laps	2
10 DNF	6	(Italy) Antonio Tamburini	Alfa Romeo 155	+16 laps	1
DNF	4	(Italy) Fabrizio De Simone	BMW 320i	+30 laps	
DNF	21	(Italy) Roberto Colciago	Honda Accord	+34 laps	

Race 2

Pos	No	Driver	Constructor	Time/Retired	Points
1	1	(Italy) Rinaldo Capello	Audi A4 Quattro	34 laps in 28:10.865	20
2	3	(Italy) Emanuele Naspetti	BMW 320i	+2.081s	15
3	2	(Austria) Karl Wendlinger	Audi A4 Quattro	+20.056s	12
4	5	(Italy) Fabrizio Giovanardi	Alfa Romeo 155	+37.757s	10
5	21	(Italy) Roberto Colciago	Honda Accord	+47.995s	8
6	53	(Italy) Massimo Pigoli	BMW 320i	+1 lap	6
7	52	(Italy) Moreno Soli	Alfa Romeo 155	+2 laps	4
8	55	(Italy) Davide Bernasconi	Alfa Romeo 155	+2 laps	3
9	6	(Italy) Antonio Tamburini	Alfa Romeo 155	+9 laps	2
10 DNF	61	(Italy) Emanuele Moncini	Opel Vectra GT	+15 laps	1
11 DNF	63	(Italy) Gianluca Roda	Opel Vectra 16v	+1 16 laps	
12 DNF	4	(Italy) Fabrizio De Simone	BMW 320i	+17 laps	

=== Championship standings after Round 6 ===
Drivers' Championship standings

Pos	Driver	Points
1	(Italy) Emanuele Naspetti	220
2	(Italy) Rinaldo Capello	117
3	(Austria) Karl Wendlinger	96
4	(Italy) Fabrizio Giovanardi	94
5	(Italy) Antonio Tamburini	83

Constructors' Championship standings

Pos	Constructor	Points
1	(Germany) BMW	389
2	(Italy) Alfa Romeo	300
3	(Germany) Audi	226
4	(Germany) Opel	47
5	(United States) Ford	3

== Round 7 (Italy) Pergusa ==
Qualifying

Pos	No	Driver	Car	Lap Time	Super Pole
1	5	(Italy) Fabrizio Giovanardi	Alfa Romeo 155	1.42.642	SP
2	4	(Italy) Fabrizio De Simone	BMW 320i	1.42.965	SP
3	21	(Italy) Roberto Colciago	Honda Accord	1.43.478	SP
4	3	(Italy) Emanuele Naspetti	BMW 320i	1.43.586	SP
5	2	(Austria) Karl Wendlinger	Audi A4 Quattro	1.44.554	SP
6	6	(Italy) Antonio Tamburini	Alfa Romeo 155	1.44.569	SP
7	1	(Italy) Rinaldo Capello	Audi A4 Quattro	1.44.853	SP
8	53	(Italy) Massimo Pigoli	BMW 320i	1.47.296	SP
9	52	(Italy) Moreno Soli	Alfa Romeo 155	1.47.963	SP
10	63	(Italy) Gianluca Roda	Opel Vectra 16v	2.11.470	SP
11	58	(Italy) Maurizio Lusuardi	BMW 320i	1.48.604	
11	58	(Italy) Stefano Gabellini	BMW 320i	1.48.604	
12	55	(Italy) Davide Bernasconi	Alfa Romeo 155	1.54.380	

Race 1

Pos	No	Driver	Constructor	Time/Retired	Points
1	5	(Italy) Fabrizio Giovanardi	Alfa Romeo 155	16 laps in 27:59.052	20
2	3	(Italy) Emanuele Naspetti	BMW 320i	+4.531s	15
3	21	(Italy) Roberto Colciago	Honda Accord	+10.148s	12
4	2	(Austria) Karl Wendlinger	Audi A4 Quattro	+19.434s	10
5	1	(Italy) Rinaldo Capello	Audi A4 Quattro	+25.294s	8
6	53	(Italy) Massimo Pigoli	BMW 320i	+1.06.383s	6
7	52	(Italy) Moreno Soli	Alfa Romeo 155	+1.07.163s	4
8	63	(Italy) Gianluca Roda	Opel Vectra 16v	+1.16.728s	3
9	58	(Italy) Maurizio Lusuardi	BMW 320i	+1.18.695s	2
10	4	(Italy) Fabrizio De Simone	BMW 320i	+1 lap	1
11	55	(Italy) Davide Bernasconi	Alfa Romeo 155	+1 lap	
12 DNF	6	(Italy) Antonio Tamburini	Alfa Romeo 155	+2 laps	

Race 2

Pos	No	Driver	Constructor	Time/Retired	Points
1	5	(Italy) Fabrizio Giovanardi	Alfa Romeo 155	16 laps in 27:51.460	20
2	3	(Italy) Emanuele Naspetti	BMW 320i	+0.820s	15
3	4	(Italy) Fabrizio De Simone	BMW 320i	+8.943s	12
4	21	(Italy) Roberto Colciago	Honda Accord	+10.139s	10
5	2	(Austria) Karl Wendlinger	Audi A4 Quattro	+14.978s	8
6	6	(Italy) Antonio Tamburini	Alfa Romeo 155	+25.199s	6
7	53	(Italy) Massimo Pigoli	BMW 320i	+1.42.936s	4
8	1	(Italy) Rinaldo Capello	Audi A4 Quattro	+2 laps	3
DNF	63	(Italy) Gianluca Roda	Opel Vectra 16v	+12 laps	
DNF	52	(Italy) Moreno Soli	Alfa Romeo 155	+12 laps	
DNF	55	(Italy) Davide Bernasconi	Alfa Romeo 155	+15 laps	
DNF	58	(Italy) Stefano Gabellini	BMW 320i	+16 laps	

=== Championship standings after Round 7 ===
Drivers' Championship standings

Pos	Driver	Points
1	(Italy) Emanuele Naspetti	250
2	(Italy) Fabrizio Giovanardi	134
3	(Italy) Rinaldo Capello	128
4	(Austria) Karl Wendlinger	114
5	(Italy) Roberto Colciago	94

Constructors' Championship standings

Pos	Constructor	Points
1	(Germany) BMW	450
2	(Italy) Alfa Romeo	355
3	(Germany) Audi	262
4	(Germany) Opel	51
5	(United States) Ford	3

== Round 8 (Italy) Varano De Melegari ==
Qualifying

Pos	No	Driver	Car	Lap Time	Super Pole
1	6	(Italy) Antonio Tamburini	Alfa Romeo 155	48.735	SP
2	4	(Italy) Fabrizio De Simone	BMW 320i	48.763	SP
3	5	(Italy) Fabrizio Giovanardi	Alfa Romeo 155	48.796	SP
4	1	(Italy) Rinaldo Capello	Audi A4 Quattro	48.880	SP
5	3	(Italy) Emanuele Naspetti	BMW 320i	48.916	SP
6	2	(Austria) Karl Wendlinger	Audi A4 Quattro	49.100	SP
7	53	(Italy) Massimo Pigoli	BMW 320i	50.497	SP
8	58	(Italy) Maurizio Lusuardi	BMW 320i	50.702	SP
8	58	(Italy) Stefano Gabellini	BMW 320i	50.702	
9	64	(Italy) Sandro Sardelli	Opel Vectra GT	50.985	SP
10	57	(Italy) Sandro Montani	Alfa Romeo 155	50.993	SP
11	52	(Italy) Moreno Soli	Alfa Romeo 155	50.649	
12	63	(Italy) Gianluca Roda	Opel Vectra 16v	50.652	
13	55	(Italy) Davide Bernasconi	Alfa Romeo 155	51.433	
14	54	(Italy) Augusto Rossetti	Alfa Romeo 155	52.006	

Race 1

Pos	No	Driver	Constructor	Time/Retired	Points
1	1	(Italy) Rinaldo Capello	Audi A4 Quattro	30 laps in 28:11.922	20
2	5	(Italy) Fabrizio Giovanardi	Alfa Romeo 155	+4.325s	15
3	2	(Austria) Karl Wendlinger	Audi A4 Quattro	+8.452s	12
4	6	(Italy) Antonio Tamburini	Alfa Romeo 155	+26.531s	10
5	3	(Italy) Emanuele Naspetti	BMW 320i	1 lap	8
6	64	(Italy) Sandro Sardelli	Opel Vectra GT	+2 laps	6
7	52	(Italy) Moreno Soli	Alfa Romeo 155	+2 laps	4
8	63	(Italy) Gianluca Roda	Opel Vectra 16v	+3 laps	3
9 DNF	53	(Italy) Massimo Pigoli	BMW 320i	+6 laps	2
DNF	55	(Italy) Davide Bernasconi	Alfa Romeo 155	+11 laps	
DNF	54	(Italy) Augusto Rossetti	Alfa Romeo 155	+15 laps	
DNF	57	(Italy) Sandro Montani	Alfa Romeo 155	+27 laps	
DNF	58	(Italy) Maurizio Lusuardi	BMW 320i	+29 laps	
DNF	4	(Italy) Fabrizio De Simone	BMW 320i	+30 laps	

Race 2

Pos	No	Driver	Constructor	Time/Retired	Points
1	1	(Italy) Rinaldo Capello	Audi A4 Quattro	30 laps in 28:04.697	20
2	5	(Italy) Fabrizio Giovanardi	Alfa Romeo 155	+5.145s	15
3	2	(Austria) Karl Wendlinger	Audi A4 Quattro	+13.657s	12
4	6	(Italy) Antonio Tamburini	Alfa Romeo 155	+17.576s	10
5	4	(Italy) Fabrizio De Simone	BMW 320i	+54.304s	8
6	64	(Italy) Sandro Sardelli	Opel Vectra GT	+1 lap	6
7	53	(Italy) Massimo Pigoli	BMW 320i	+1 lap	4
8	52	(Italy) Moreno Soli	Alfa Romeo 155	+2 laps	3
9	54	(Italy) Augusto Rossetti	Alfa Romeo 155	+2 laps	2
10	63	(Italy) Gianluca Roda	Opel Vectra 16v	+2 laps	1
11	57	(Italy) Sandro Montani	Alfa Romeo 155	+3 laps	
DNF	3	(Italy) Emanuele Naspetti	BMW 320i	+25 laps	
DNS	55	(Italy) Davide Bernasconi	Alfa Romeo 155		
DNS	58	(Italy) Stefano Gabellini	BMW 320i		

=== Championship standings after Round 8 ===
Drivers' Championship standings

Pos	Driver	Points
1	(Italy) Emanuele Naspetti	258
2	(Italy) Rinaldo Capello	168
3	(Italy) Fabrizio Giovanardi	164
4	(Austria) Karl Wendlinger	138
5	(Italy) Antonio Tamburini	109

Constructors' Championship standings

Pos	Constructor	Points
1	(Germany) BMW	472
2	(Italy) Alfa Romeo	414
3	(Germany) Audi	326
4	(Germany) Opel	67
5	(United States) Ford	3

== Round 9 (Italy) Misano Adriatico ==
Qualifying

Pos	No	Driver	Car	Lap Time	Super Pole
1	5	(Italy) Fabrizio Giovanardi	Alfa Romeo 155	1.35.804	SP
2	6	(Italy) Antonio Tamburini	Alfa Romeo 155	1.35.967	SP
3	4	(Italy) Fabrizio De Simone	BMW 320i	1.36.356	SP
4	3	(Italy) Emanuele Naspetti	BMW 320i	1.36.395	SP
5	2	(Austria) Karl Wendlinger	Audi A4 Quattro	1.37.041	SP
6	21	(Italy) Roberto Colciago	Honda Accord	1.37.066	SP
7	1	(Italy) Rinaldo Capello	Audi A4 Quattro	1.37.115	SP
8	64	(Italy) Sandro Sardelli	Opel Vectra GT	1.38.784	SP
9	53	(Italy) Massimo Pigoli	BMW 320i	1.40.034	SP
10	58	(Italy) Stefano Gabellini	BMW 320i	1.41.779	SP
10	58	(Italy) Maurizio Lusuardi	BMW 320i	1.41.779	SP
11	57	(Italy) Sandro Montani	Alfa Romeo 155	1.38.636	
12	52	(Italy) Moreno Soli	Alfa Romeo 155	1.38.720	
13	63	(Italy) Gianluca Roda	Opel Vectra 16v	1.38.840	
14	65	(Italy) Gianni Giudici	Alfa Romeo 155	1.39.487	
15	55	(Italy) Davide Bernasconi	Alfa Romeo 155	1.42.471	
16	54	(Italy) Augusto Rossetti	Alfa Romeo 155	1.44.156	

Race 1

Pos	No	Driver	Constructor	Time/Retired	Points
1	3	(Italy) Emanuele Naspetti	BMW 320i	18 laps in 29:18.326	20
2	5	(Italy) Fabrizio Giovanardi	Alfa Romeo 155	+1.725s	15
3	4	(Italy) Fabrizio De Simone	BMW 320i	+14.294s	12
4	6	(Italy) Antonio Tamburini	Alfa Romeo 155	+14.701s	10
5	21	(Italy) Roberto Colciago	Honda Accord	+18.576s	8
6	1	(Italy) Rinaldo Capello	Audi A4 Quattro	+19.250s	6
7	63	(Italy) Gianluca Roda	Opel Vectra 16v	+1.16.540s	4
8	52	(Italy) Moreno Soli	Alfa Romeo 155	+1.35.026s	3
9	57	(Italy) Sandro Montani	Alfa Romeo 155	+1.37.116s	2
10	55	(Italy) Davide Bernasconi	Alfa Romeo 155	+1 lap	1
11	54	(Italy) Augusto Rossetti	Alfa Romeo 155	+1 lap	
12	58	(Italy) Stefano Gabellini	BMW 320i	+1 lap	
13	64	(Italy) Sandro Sardelli	Opel Vectra GT	+1 lap	
DNF	65	(Italy) Gianni Giudici	Alfa Romeo 155	+8 laps	
DNF	2	(Austria) Karl Wendlinger	Audi A4 Quattro	+16 laps	
DNF	53	(Italy) Massimo Pigoli	BMW 320i	+18 laps	

Race 2

Pos	No	Driver	Constructor	Time/Retired	Points
1	3	(Italy) Emanuele Naspetti	BMW 320i	18 laps in 29:13.546	20
2	5	(Italy) Fabrizio Giovanardi	Alfa Romeo 155	+4.574s	15
3	4	(Italy) Fabrizio De Simone	BMW 320i	+5.788s	12
4	21	(Italy) Roberto Colciago	Honda Accord	+22.680s	10
5	2	(Austria) Karl Wendlinger	Audi A4 Quattro	+28.240s	8
6	6	(Italy) Antonio Tamburini	Alfa Romeo 155	+37.857s	6
7	53	(Italy) Massimo Pigoli	BMW 320i	+1.17.206s	4
8	63	(Italy) Gianluca Roda	Opel Vectra 16v	+1.17.370s	3
9	52	(Italy) Moreno Soli	Alfa Romeo 155	+1.17.505s	2
10	57	(Italy) Sandro Montani	Alfa Romeo 155	+1.30.880s	1
11	58	(Italy) Maurizio Lusuardi	BMW 320i	+1 lap	
12	54	(Italy) Fabio Severino	Alfa Romeo 155	+2 laps	
13	55	(Italy) Davide Bernasconi	Alfa Romeo 155	+2 laps	
DNF	1	(Italy) Rinaldo Capello	Audi A4 Quattro	+12 laps	
DNF	64	(Italy) Sandro Sardelli	Opel Vectra GT	+12 laps	
DNS	65	(Italy) Gianni Giudici	Alfa Romeo 155		

=== Championship standings after Round 9 ===
Drivers' Championship standings

Pos	Driver	Points
1	(Italy) Emanuele Naspetti	298
2	(Italy) Fabrizio Giovanardi	194
3	(Italy) Rinaldo Capello	174
4	(Austria) Karl Wendlinger	146
5	(Italy) Fabrizio De Simone	125

Constructors' Championship standings

Pos	Constructor	Points
1	(Germany) BMW	543
2	(Italy) Alfa Romeo	477
3	(Germany) Audi	344
4	(Germany) Opel	77
5	(United States) Ford	3

== Round 10 (Italy) Vallelunga ==
Qualifying

Pos	No	Driver	Car	Lap Time	Super Pole
1	5	(Italy) Fabrizio Giovanardi	Alfa Romeo 155	1.14.512	SP
2	3	(Italy) Emanuele Naspetti	BMW 320i	1.14.970	SP
3	4	(Italy) Fabrizio De Simone	BMW 320i	1.14.972	SP
4	21	(Italy) Roberto Colciago	Honda Accord	1.15.013	SP
5	1	(Italy) Rinaldo Capello	Audi A4 Quattro	1.15.067	SP
6	6	(Italy) Antonio Tamburini	Alfa Romeo 155	1.15.151	SP
7	2	(Austria) Karl Wendlinger	Audi A4 Quattro	1.15.634	SP
8	57	(Italy) Sandro Montani	Alfa Romeo 155	1.18.238	SP
9	63	(Italy) Gianluca Roda	Opel Vectra 16v	1.19.705	SP
10	64	(Italy) Sandro Sardelli	Opel Vectra GT	1.21.928	SP
11	53	(Italy) Massimo Pigoli	BMW 320i	1.19.223	
12	58	(Italy) Maurizio Lusuardi	BMW 320i	1.19.227	
12	58	(Italy) Stefano Gabellini	BMW 320i	1.19.227	
13	52	(Italy) Moreno Soli	Alfa Romeo 155	1.19.308	
14	59	(Italy) Lorenzo Falessi	Alfa Romeo 155	1.20.170	
15	54	(Italy) Augusto Rossetti	Alfa Romeo 155	1.20.456	
16	55	(Italy) Davide Bernasconi	Alfa Romeo 155	1.22.123	
17	67	(Italy) Sergio Sambataro	Opel Vectra GT	1.47.404	

Race 1

Pos	No	Driver	Constructor	Time/Retired	Points
1	5	(Italy) Fabrizio Giovanardi	Alfa Romeo 155	22 laps in 28:00.622	20
2	3	(Italy) Emanuele Naspetti	BMW 320i	+5.279s	15
3	4	(Italy) Fabrizio De Simone	BMW 320i	+5.639s	12
4	21	(Italy) Roberto Colciago	Honda Accord	+22.189s	10
5	6	(Italy) Antonio Tamburini	Alfa Romeo 155	+23.982s	8
6	1	(Italy) Rinaldo Capello	Audi A4 Quattro	+33.938s	6
7	2	(Austria) Karl Wendlinger	Audi A4 Quattro	+34.174s	4
8	67	(Italy) Sergio Sambataro	Opel Vectra GT	+1 lap	3
9	52	(Italy) Moreno Soli	Alfa Romeo 155	+1 lap	2
10	63	(Italy) Gianluca Roda	Opel Vectra 16v	+1 lap	1
11	58	(Italy) Maurizio Lusuardi	BMW 320i	+1 lap	
12	59	(Italy) Lorenzo Falessi	Alfa Romeo 155	+2 laps	
13	57	(Italy) Sandro Montani	Alfa Romeo 155	+2 laps	
14	55	(Italy) Davide Bernasconi	Alfa Romeo 155	+4 laps	
15 DNF	53	(Italy) Massimo Pigoli	BMW 320i	+9 laps	
DNF	64	(Italy) Sandro Sardelli	Opel Vectra GT	+12 laps	
DNF	54	(Italy) Augusto Rossetti	Alfa Romeo 155	+13 laps	

Race 2

Pos	No	Driver	Constructor	Time/Retired	Points
1	4	(Italy) Fabrizio De Simone	BMW 320i	22 laps in 27.59.686	20
2	5	(Italy) Fabrizio Giovanardi	Alfa Romeo 155	+0.000s	15
3	3	(Italy) Emanuele Naspetti	BMW 320i	+0.199s	12
4	1	(Italy) Rinaldo Capello	Audi A4 Quattro	+7.364s	10
5	6	(Italy) Antonio Tamburini	Alfa Romeo 155	+10.798s	8
6	2	(Austria) Karl Wendlinger	Audi A4 Quattro	+20.168s	6
7	57	(Italy) Sandro Montani	Alfa Romeo 155	+1 lap	4
8	58	(Italy) Stefano Gabellini	BMW 320i	+1 lap	3
9	52	(Italy) Moreno Soli	Alfa Romeo 155	+1 lap	2
10	63	(Italy) Gianluca Roda	Opel Vectra 16v	+1 lap	1
11	55	(Italy) Davide Bernasconi	Alfa Romeo 155	+1 lap	
12	59	(Italy) Lorenzo Falessi	Alfa Romeo 155	+1 lap	
13 DNF	54	(Italy) Fabio Severino	Alfa Romeo 155	+4 laps	
14 DNF	21	(Italy) Roberto Colciago	Honda Accord	+10 laps	
DNF	53	(Italy) Massimo Pigoli	BMW 320i	+17 laps	
DNF	67	(Italy) Sergio Sambataro	Opel Vectra GT	+17 laps	
DNS	64	(Italy) Sandro Sardelli	Opel Vectra GT		

=== Championship standings after (Final) Round 10 ===
Drivers' Championship standings

Pos	Driver	Points
1	(Italy) Emanuele Naspetti	325
2	(Italy) Fabrizio Giovanardi	229
3	(Italy) Rinaldo Capello	190
4	(Italy) Fabrizio De Simone	157
5	(Austria) Karl Wendlinger	156

Constructors' Championship standings

Pos	Constructor	Points
1	(Germany) BMW	606
2	(Italy) Alfa Romeo	537
3	(Germany) Audi	374
4	(Germany) Opel	88
5	(United States) Ford	3

== Championship standings ==
Points system
**1st**	**2nd**	**3rd**	**4th**	**5th**	**6th**	**7th**	**8th**	**9th**	**10th**
20	15	12	10	8	6	4	3	2	1

=== Drivers' Championship ===
Pos	Driver	Car	MON (Italy)		MUG (Italy)		MAG (Italy)		IMO (Italy)		IMO (Italy)		BIN (Italy)		PER (Italy)		VAR (Italy)		MIS (Italy)		VAL (Italy)		Pts
1	(Italy) Emanuele Naspetti	BMW	**1**	**1**	1	**2**	1	**1**	2	1	2	1	1	**2**	2	2	5	Ret	1	**1**	2	3	325
2	(Italy) Fabrizio Giovanardi	Alfa Romeo	Ret	DNS	**5**	1	Ret	5	**1**	**Ret**	8	2	4	4	**1**	**1**	2	2	**2**	2	**1**	**2**	229
3	(Italy) Rinaldo Capello	Audi	2	12	Ret	12	5	3	4	2	4	3	**2**	1	5	8	1	**1**	6	Ret	6	4	190
4	(Italy) Fabrizio de Simone	BMW	Ret	3	Ret	7	**2**	2	3	3	DSQ	4	Ret	Ret	10	3	Ret	5	3	3	3	1	157
5	(Austria) Karl Wendlinger	Audi	3	4	3	4	Ret	Ret	6	6	3	7	3	3	4	5	3	3	Ret	5	7	6	156
6	(Italy) Antonio Tamburini	Alfa Romeo			4	3	4	4	11	4	**1**	**5**	10	9	12	6	**4**	4	4	6	5	5	140
7	(Italy) Roberto Colciago	Honda	Ret	2	2	Ret	3	12	5	5	Ret	6	Ret	5	3	4			5	4	4	14	122
8	(Italy) Massimo Pigoli	BMW	5	5	Ret	13	6	6	7	7	5	8	5	6	6	7	9	7	Ret	7	15	Ret	81
9	(Italy) Moreno Soli	Alfa Romeo	Ret	6	9	5	8	10	8	8	10	12	6	7	7	Ret	7	8	8	9	9	9	57
10	(Italy) Sandro Sardelli	Opel	6	11	Ret	Ret	7	7	9	9	6	Ret					6	6	13	Ret	Ret	DNS	36
11	(Italy) Gianluca Roda	Ford - Opel	8	13	6	Ret	9	Ret	10	10	Ret	11	7	Ret	8	Ret	8	10	7	8	10	10	33
12	(Italy) Sandro Montani	Alfa Romeo	9	9	12	6	10	8	14	11	9	Ret					Ret	11	9	10	13	7	23
13	(Italy) Davide Bernasconi	Alfa Romeo	10	8	10	10	11	9	12	12	11	10	8	8	11	Ret	Ret	DNS	10	13	14	11	16
14	(Italy) Gordon de Adamich	Alfa Romeo	4	Ret																			10
15	(Italy) Felice Tedeschi	Alfa Romeo	7	Ret	7	9	13	DNS	13	DNS													10
16	(Italy) Maurizio Lusuardi	BMW	Ret			8					7				9		Ret			11	11		9
17	(Italy) Stefano Gabellini	BMW		Ret	8				Ret	Ret		9				Ret		DNS	12			8	8
18	(Italy) Augusto Rossetti	Alfa Romeo	12	7													Ret	9	11		Ret		6
19	(Italy) Sergio Sambataro	Opel																			8	Ret	3
20	(Italy) Emanuele Moncini	Opel											9	Ret									2
21	(Italy) Lorenzo Falessi	Alfa Romeo	11	10	11	11	12	11			12	13									12	12	1
	(Italy) Fabio Severino	Alfa Romeo																		12		13	0
	(Italy) Gianni Giudici	Alfa Romeo																	Ret	Ret			0
	(Italy) Maurizio Flammini	Ford							DNS	DNS													0
Pos	Driver	Car	MON (Italy)		MUG (Italy)		MAG (Italy)		IMO (Italy)		IMO (Italy)		BIN (Italy)		PER (Italy)		VAR (Italy)		MIS (Italy)		VAL (Italy)		Pts

Colour	Result
Gold	Winner
Silver	Second place
Bronze	Third place
Green	Points classification
Blue	Non-points classification
Blue	Non-classified finish (NC)
Purple	Retired, not classified (Ret)
Red	Did not qualify (DNQ)
Red	Did not pre-qualify (DNPQ)
Black	Disqualified (DSQ)
White	Did not start (DNS)
White	Withdrew (WD)
White	Race cancelled (C)
Blank	Did not practice (DNP)
Blank	Did not arrive (DNA)
Blank	Excluded (EX)

**Bold** – Pole
Italics – Fastest Lap

=== Manufacturers' Trophy ===
Pos	Manufacturer	Driver	MON (Italy)		MUG (Italy)		MAG (Italy)		IMO (Italy)		IMO (Italy)		BIN (Italy)		PER (Italy)		VAR (Italy)		MIS (Italy)		VAL (Italy)		Pts
1	(Germany) BMW	(Italy) Emanuele Naspetti	1	1	1	2	1	1	2	1	2	1	1	2	2	2	5	Ret	1	1	2	3	606
1	(Germany) BMW	(Italy) Fabrizio De Simone	Ret	2	Ret	7	2	2	3	3	DSQ	4	Ret	Ret	9	3	Ret	5	3	3	3	1	606
1	(Germany) BMW	(Italy) Massimo Pigoli	5	4	Ret	13	5	6	6	6	5	7	5	5	5	6	9	7	Ret	6	15	Ret	606
1	(Germany) BMW	(Italy) Maurizio Lusuardi: Stefano Gabellini	Ret	Ret	7	8					7	8			8	Ret	Ret	DNS	12	10	10	8	606
2	(Italy) Alfa Romeo	(Italy) Fabrizio Giovanardi	Ret	DNS	4	1	Ret	5	1	Ret	8	2	4	4	1	1	2	2	2	2	1	2	537
2	(Italy) Alfa Romeo	(Italy) Antonio Tamburini			3	3	3	4	10	4	1	5	10	8	11	5	4	4	4	5	4	5	537
2	(Italy) Alfa Romeo	(Italy) Gordon de Adamich	4	Ret																			537
2	(Italy) Alfa Romeo	(Italy) Moreno Soli	Ret	5	8	5	7	10	7	7	10	11	6	6	6	Ret	7	8	7	8	8	9	537
2	(Italy) Alfa Romeo	(Italy) Sandro Montani	9	8	11	6	9	8	14	10	9	Ret					Ret	10	8	9	12	7	537
2	(Italy) Alfa Romeo	(Italy) Davide Bernasconi	10	7	9	10	10	9	11	11	11	9	8	7	10	Ret	Ret	DNS	9	12	13	11	537
2	(Italy) Alfa Romeo	(Italy) Felice Tedeschi	7	Ret	6	9	12	DNS	12	DNS													537
2	(Italy) Alfa Romeo	(Italy) Augusto Rossetti	12	6													Ret	9	10		Ret		537
2	(Italy) Alfa Romeo	(Italy) Lorenzo Falessi	11	9	10	11	11	11			11	12									11	12	537
3	(Germany) Audi	(Italy) Rinaldo Capello	2	12	Ret	12	4	3	4	2	4	3	2	1	4	7	1	1	5	Ret	5	4	374
3	(Germany) Audi	(Austria) Karl Wendlinger	3	3	2	4	Ret	Ret	5	5	3	6	3	3	3	4	3	3	Ret	4	6	6	374
4	(Germany) Opel	(Italy) Sandro Sardelli	6	10	Ret	Ret	6	7	8	8	6	Ret					6	6	12	Ret	Ret	DNS	88
4	(Germany) Opel	(Italy) Gianluca Roda			5	Ret	8	Ret	9	9	Ret	10	7	Ret	7	Ret	8	10	6	7	9	10	88
4	(Germany) Opel	(Italy) Sergio Sambataro																			7	Ret	88
4	(Germany) Opel	(Italy) Emanuele Moncini											9	9									88
5	(United States) Ford	(Italy) Gianluca Roda	8	13																			3

Colour	Result
Gold	Winner
Silver	Second place
Bronze	Third place
Green	Points classification
Blue	Non-points classification
Blue	Non-classified finish (NC)
Purple	Retired, not classified (Ret)
Red	Did not qualify (DNQ)
Red	Did not pre-qualify (DNPQ)
Black	Disqualified (DSQ)
White	Did not start (DNS)
White	Withdrew (WD)
White	Race cancelled (C)
Blank	Did not practice (DNP)
Blank	Did not arrive (DNA)
Blank	Excluded (EX)

=== Privateers' Championship ===
Pos	Driver	Car	MON (Italy)		MUG (Italy)		MAG (Italy)		IMO (Italy)		IMO (Italy)		BIN (Italy)		PER (Italy)		VAR (Italy)		MIS (Italy)		VAL (Italy)		Pts
1	(Italy) Massimo Pigoli	BMW	1	1	Ret	Ret	1	1	1	1	1	1	1	1	1	1	4	2	Ret	1	Ret	Ret	285
2	(Italy) Moreno Soli	Alfa Romeo	Ret	2	4	1	3	5	2	2	5	5	2	2	2	Ret	2	3	2	3	2	3	237
3	(Italy) Gianluca Roda	Opel	4	Ret	1	Ret	4	Ret	4	4	Ret	4	3	Ret	3	Ret	3	5	1	2	3	4	171
4	(Italy) Davide Bernasconi	Alfa Romeo	6	3	5	5	6	4	6	6	6	3	4	3	5	Ret	Ret	DNS	4	7	7	5	136
5	(Italy) Sandro Sardelli	Opel	2	Ret	Ret	DNS	2	2	3	3	2	Ret					1	1	7	Ret	Ret	DNS	128
6	(Italy) Sandro Montani	Alfa Romeo	5	5	Ret	2	5	3	7	5	4	Ret					Ret	6	3	4	6	1	127
7	(Italy) Maurizio Lusuardi	BMW	Ret			3					3				4		Ret			5	4		52
8	(Italy) Stefano Gabellini	BMW		DNS	3				Ret	Ret		2				Ret|		DNS	6			2	48
9	(Italy) Lorenzo Falessi	Alfa Romeo	7	6	Ret	6	7	6			7	Ret									5	6	44
10	(Italy) Felice Tedeschi	Alfa Romeo	3	Ret	2	4	Ret	DNS	6	DNS													43
Pos	Driver	Car	MON (Italy)		MUG (Italy)		MAG (Italy)		IMO (Italy)		IMO (Italy)		BIN (Italy)		PER (Italy)		VAR (Italy)		MIS (Italy)		VAL (Italy)		Pts

Colour	Result
Gold	Winner
Silver	Second place
Bronze	Third place
Green	Points classification
Blue	Non-points classification
Blue	Non-classified finish (NC)
Purple	Retired, not classified (Ret)
Red	Did not qualify (DNQ)
Red	Did not pre-qualify (DNPQ)
Black	Disqualified (DSQ)
White	Did not start (DNS)
White	Withdrew (WD)
White	Race cancelled (C)
Blank	Did not practice (DNP)
Blank	Did not arrive (DNA)
Blank	Excluded (EX)
