= 1998 Italian Superturismo Championship =

Seasons
- ← 1997 1999 →

The 1998 Italian Superturismo Championship was the twelfth edition of the Italian Superturismo Championship. The season began in Binetto on 17 May and finished in Vallelunga on 4 October, after ten rounds.

== Season summary ==
The 1998 season started months before into the court between the 2 promoters Salerno Corse (the historical promoter of the serie since 1987) and Sponsor Service who was supported by the 3 manufactures (Alfa, Audi, BMW). After a long discussion after the championship were already started, it was declared that Sponsor Service were the new promoter for the next 3 years.

The first change of Sponsor Service was to pass from the smaller TMC channel to Italian state channel RAI TV. The idea of the new promoter (and manufactures too) was that if the races were on RAI Channel before the start of f1, there would have been better results in term of audience.

So after the first two rounds (Binetto and Imola) without any TV coverage, RAI transmitted live race 1 of Round 3 and 4 in Monza and Varano before that the promoter was stopped again by court. Round 5, 6 and 7 in Vallelunga, Magione and Pergusa were again without any TV coverage before that the final decision from court that assigned definitively the Sponsor Service as new promoters of Italian Superturismo. Due to Rai needs for the last 3 rounds of the season it was also decided to move race 1 on Saturday going live before the f1 qualifying while there would have been a summery on Sunday night about race 2.

Although in terms of audience there was a promising result, the TV coverage in 1998 was a complete disaster compared to the previous years. The most penalised were the private drivers that never as in this year made a big effort to buy competitive cars.

In 1998 it was also decided to copy from STW, adopting a new qualifying system and a new race format. The Super Pole used until 1997 with one single lap for top ten drivers was replaced by 30 minutes of qualifying session. The race format changed from 2 races of 75km into 1 sprint race of 50km and 1 mini endurance race of 100km.

Fabrizio Giovanardi after 5 years where he came always close to the title, finally won the championship, driving the new and immediately competitive Alfa Romeo 156; the Italian manufacturer won also the constructors' championship, while the rookie Fabian Peroni took the privateers' trophy driving an ex official Audi A4 Quattro.

The fight for the Championship was balanced between Giovanardi and Naspetti until round 6 in Magione where the 2 contenders were divided by just 1 point, but in the final part of the Giovanardi scored 6 victories in a row (Pergusa, Misano, Monza) that allowed him to become the new champion before the last round in Vallelunga.

Nicola Larini made his debut in Italian Supertouring after leaving the series in 1992 but due to his limited knowledge of the FWD he was not able to fight for the title although he helped his team mate against BMW and he won the challenge against De Simone for the third place in the final Standing.

Rinaldo Capello remained as the only driver for Audi. He drove for the first time the Audi A4 fwd but the car was not at all competitive due to high tyre degradation specially in the endurance race, with a worse aerodynamic package compared to Alfa and a worse engine power compared to BMW. On the fast tracks Audi A4 never had the same performance of Alfa 156, in the slow tracks Audi was always slower the BMW, Alfa and sometimes also of the ex official Audi A4 Quattro. Only in the last 2 round of the season with the new engine Capello was able to show a promising performance. Unfortunately Audi left officially the Supertouring (in BTCC, STW and Italy) at the end of the season to focus on Le Mans Program.

== Teams and drivers ==
Team	Car	No.	Drivers	Rounds	Class
(Italy) BMW Italia	BMW 320i	1	(Italy) Emanuele Naspetti	All	
(Italy) BMW Italia	BMW 320i	2	(Italy) Fabrizio de Simone	All	
(Italy) BMW Italia	BMW 320i	6	(Italy) Roberto Colciago	8-10	
(Italy) Nordauto Engineering	Alfa Romeo 156	3	(Italy) Fabrizio Giovanardi	All	
(Italy) Nordauto Engineering	Alfa Romeo 156	4	(Italy) Nicola Larini	All	
(Italy) Nordauto Engineering	Alfa Romeo 156	7	(Italy) Antonio Tamburini	9-10	
(Italy) Nordauto Engineering	Alfa Romeo 156	8	(Italy) Stefano Modena	9	
(Italy) Audi Sport Italia	Audi A4	5	(Italy) Rinaldo Capello	All	
(Italy) Christy's Team	Honda Accord	51	(Italy) Massimo Pigoli	1-4, 8-10	P
(Italy) Soli Racing Team	Audi A4 Quattro	52	(Italy) Moreno Soli	All	P
(Italy) Greyhound Motorsport	Alfa Romeo 155 TS	53	(Italy) Gianluca Roda	1-5, 7-9	P
(Italy) AGS Motorsport	Audi A4 Quattro	54	(Italy) Fabian Peroni	All	P
(Italy) Varese Corse	Audi A4 Quattro	55	(Italy) Davide Bernasconi	1-9	P
(Italy) Italian Promotorsport	BMW 320i	56	(Italy) Sandro Sardelli	All	P
(Italy) Italian Promotorsport	BMW 320i	58	(Portugal) Miguel Ramos	All	P
(Italy) BMS Scuderia Italia	Alfa Romeo 155 TS	59	(Italy) Christian Pescatori	All	P
(Italy) BMS Scuderia Italia	Alfa Romeo 155 TS	60	(Italy) Emanuele Moncini	All	P
(Italy) Lucchetti Racing	Opel Vectra	62	(Italy) Guido Lucchetti Cigarini	3-6, 9-10	P

Icon	Class
P	Private Drivers

=== Drivers changes ===
Changed Cars

- Fabrizio Giovanardi: Alfa Romeo 155 → Alfa Romeo 156
- Rinaldo Capello: Audi A4 Quattro → Audi A4
- Antonio Tamburini: Alfa Romeo 155 → Alfa Romeo 156
- Roberto Colciago: Honda Accord → BMW 320i
- Massimo Pigoli: BMW 320i → Honda Accord
- Moreno Soli: Alfa Romeo 155 → Audi A4 Quattro
- Gianluca Roda: Opel Vectra 16v → Alfa Romeo 155
- Davide Bernasconi: Alfa Romeo 155 → Audi A4 Quattro
- Sandro Sardelli: Opel Vectra Gt → BMW 320i
- Emanuele Moncini: Opel Vectra Gt → Alfa Romeo 155

Entering Superturismo 1998

- Nicola Larini: F1 → Alfa Romeo 156
- Fabian Peroni: Renault Megan Cup → Audi A4 Quattro
- Miguel Ramos: Portuguese Touring Car Championship → BMW 320i
- Christian Pescatori: FIA GT Championship → Alfa Romeo 156
- Guido Lucchetti Cigarini: No full-time drive → Opel Vectra Gt

Leaving Superturismo 1998

- Karl Wendlinger
- Felice Tedeschi
- Augusto Rossetti
- Fabio Severino
- Sandro Montani
- Maurizio Lusuardi
- Stefano Gabellini
- Lorenzo Falessi
- Gianni Giudici

== Race calendar and results ==
Round		Circuit	Date	Pole position	Fastest lap	Winning driver	Winning team
1	R1	(Italy) Binetto	17 May	(Italy) Fabrizio de Simone	(Italy) Emanuele Naspetti	(Italy) Fabrizio de Simone	(Italy) CiBiEmme Engineering
1	R2	(Italy) Binetto	17 May		(Italy) Emanuele Naspetti	(Italy) Emanuele Naspetti	(Italy) CiBiEmme Engineering
2	R1	(Italy) Imola	31 May	(Italy) Fabrizio Giovanardi	(Italy) Fabrizio Giovanardi	(Italy) Fabrizio Giovanardi	(Italy) Nordauto Engineering
2	R2	(Italy) Imola	31 May		(Italy) Emanuele Naspetti	(Italy) Fabrizio de Simone	(Italy) CiBiEmme Engineering
3	R1	(Italy) Monza	28 June	(Italy) Fabrizio Giovanardi	(Italy) Fabrizio Giovanardi	(Italy) Nicola Larini	(Italy) Nordauto Engineering
3	R2	(Italy) Monza	28 June		(Italy) Fabrizio Giovanardi	(Italy) Fabrizio Giovanardi	(Italy) Nordauto Engineering
4	R1	(Italy) Varano De Melegari	12 July	(Italy) Fabrizio Giovanardi	(Italy) Emanuele Naspetti	(Italy) Emanuele Naspetti	(Italy) CiBiEmme Engineering
4	R2	(Italy) Varano De Melegari	12 July		(Italy) Emanuele Naspetti	(Italy) Emanuele Naspetti	(Italy) CiBiEmme Engineering
5	R1	(Italy) Vallelunga	26 July	(Italy) Fabrizio Giovanardi	(Italy) Emanuele Naspetti	(Italy) Emanuele Naspetti	(Italy) CiBiEmme Engineering
5	R2	(Italy) Vallelunga	26 July		(Italy) Emanuele Naspetti	(Italy) Emanuele Naspetti	(Italy) CiBiEmme Engineering
6	R1	(Italy) Magione	2 August	(Italy) Fabrizio Giovanardi	(Italy) Emanuele Naspetti	(Italy) Fabrizio Giovanardi	(Italy) Nordauto Engineering
6	R2	(Italy) Magione	2 August		(Italy) Fabrizio de Simone	(Italy) Fabrizio de Simone	(Italy) CiBiEmme Engineering
7	R1	(Italy) Pergusa	30 August	(Italy) Fabrizio Giovanardi	(Italy) Nicola Larini	(Italy) Fabrizio Giovanardi	(Italy) Nordauto Engineering
7	R2	(Italy) Pergusa	30 August		(Italy) Fabrizio Giovanardi	(Italy) Fabrizio Giovanardi	(Italy) Nordauto Engineering
8	R1	(Italy) Misano Adriatico	12 September	(Italy) Emanuele Naspetti	(Italy) Fabrizio Giovanardi	(Italy) Fabrizio Giovanardi	(Italy) Nordauto Engineering
8	R2	(Italy) Misano Adriatico	13 September		(Italy) Fabrizio de Simone	(Italy) Fabrizio Giovanardi	(Italy) Nordauto Engineering
9	R1	(Italy) Monza	26 September	(Italy) Fabrizio Giovanardi	(Italy) Stefano Modena	(Italy) Fabrizio Giovanardi	(Italy) Nordauto Engineering
9	R2	(Italy) Monza	27 September		(Italy) Fabrizio Giovanardi	(Italy) Fabrizio Giovanardi	(Italy) Nordauto Engineering
10	R1	(Italy) Vallelunga	3 October	(Italy) Emanuele Naspetti	(Italy) Roberto Colciago	(Italy) Nicola Larini	(Italy) Nordauto Engineering
10	R2	(Italy) Vallelunga	4 October		(Italy) Nicola Larini	(Italy) Nicola Larini	(Italy) Nordauto Engineering

== Round 1 (Italy) Binetto ==
Qualifying

Pos	No	Driver	Car	Lap Time	Points
1	2	(Italy) Fabrizio De Simone	BMW 320i	50.537	2
2	1	(Italy) Emanuele Naspetti	BMW 320i	50.711	
3	5	(Italy) Rinaldo Capello	Audi A4	50.736	
4	3	(Italy) Fabrizio Giovanardi	Alfa Romeo 156	50.887	
5	54	(Italy) Fabian Peroni	Audi A4 Quattro	51.525	
6	52	(Italy) Moreno Soli	Audi A4 Quattro	52.120	
7	59	(Italy) Christian Pescatori	Alfa Romeo 155	52.325	
8	55	(Italy) Davide Bernasconi	Audi A4 Quattro	54.361	
9	51	(Italy) Massimo Pigoli	Honda Accord	54.677	
10	60	(Italy) Emanuele Moncini	Alfa Romeo 155	55.080	
11	53	(Italy) Gianluca Roda	Alfa Romeo 155	55.157	
12	58	(Portugal) Miguel Ramos	BMW 320i	55.520	
13	56	(Italy) Sandro Sardelli	BMW 320i	56.966	
14	4	(Italy) Nicola Larini	Alfa Romeo 156	no time	

Race 1

Pos	No	Driver	Constructor	Time/Retired	Points
1	2	(Italy) Fabrizio De Simone	BMW 320i	32 laps in 26:02.235	20
2	1	(Italy) Emanuele Naspetti	BMW 320i	+12.431s	15
3	3	(Italy) Fabrizio Giovanardi	Alfa Romeo 156	+15.234s	12
4	54	(Italy) Fabian Peroni	Audi A4 Quattro	+17.215s	10
5	4	(Italy) Nicola Larini	Alfa Romeo 156	+21.999s	8
6	5	(Italy) Rinaldo Capello	Audi A4	+39.251s	6
7	52	(Italy) Moreno Soli	Audi A4 Quattro	+47.318s	4
8	59	(Italy) Christian Pescatori	Alfa Romeo 155	+48.823s	3
9	55	(Italy) Davide Bernasconi	Audi A4 Quattro	+49.806s	2
10	60	(Italy) Emanuele Moncini	Alfa Romeo 155	+1 lap	1
11	56	(Italy) Sandro Sardelli	BMW 320i	+1 lap	
12	51	(Italy) Massimo Pigoli	Honda Accord	+1 lap	
13	53	(Italy) Gianluca Roda	Alfa Romeo 155	+2 laps	
DNF	58	(Portugal) Miguel Ramos	BMW 320i	+9 laps	

Race 2

Pos	No	Driver	Constructor	Time/Retired	Points
1	1	(Italy) Emanuele Naspetti	BMW 320i	61 laps in 52:41.105	40
2	3	(Italy) Fabrizio Giovanardi	Alfa Romeo 156	+3.100s	30
3	4	(Italy) Nicola Larini	Alfa Romeo 156	+13.526s	24
4	5	(Italy) Rinaldo Capello	Audi A4	+21.852s	20
5	59	(Italy) Christian Pescatori	Alfa Romeo 155	+1.04.292s	16
6	52	(Italy) Moreno Soli	Audi A4 Quattro	+1.11.862s	12
7	55	(Italy) Davide Bernasconi	Audi A4 Quattro	+1.19.246s	8
8	60	(Italy) Emanuele Moncini	Alfa Romeo 155	+1.23.314s	6
9 DNF	58	(Portugal) Miguel Ramos	BMW 320i	+6 laps	4
10 DNF	54	(Italy) Fabian Peroni	Audi A4 Quattro	+18 laps	2
DNF	53	(Italy) Gianluca Roda	Alfa Romeo 155	+18 laps	
DNF	2	(Italy) Fabrizio De Simone	BMW 320i	+61 laps	
DNF	51	(Italy) Massimo Pigoli	Honda Accord	+61 laps	
DNF	56	(Italy) Sandro Sardelli	BMW 320i	+61 laps	

=== Championship standings after Round 1 ===
Drivers' Championship standings

Pos	Driver	Points
1	(Italy) Emanuele Naspetti	55
2	(Italy) Fabrizio Giovanardi	42
3	(Italy) Nicola Larini	32
4	(Italy) Rinaldo Capello	26
5	(Italy) Fabrizio De Simone	22

Constructors' Championship standings

Pos	Constructor	Points
1	(Italy) Alfa Romeo	93
2	(Germany) BMW	79
3	(Germany) Audi	60

== Round 2 (Italy) Imola ==
Qualifying

Pos	No	Driver	Car	Lap Time	Points
1	3	(Italy) Fabrizio Giovanardi	Alfa Romeo 156	1.55.908	2
2	1	(Italy) Emanuele Naspetti	BMW 320i	1.56.097	
3	2	(Italy) Fabrizio De Simone	BMW 320i	1.56.627	
4	59	(Italy) Christian Pescatori	Alfa Romeo 155	1.58.444	
5	56	(Italy) Sandro Sardelli	BMW 320i	1.58.833	
6	54	(Italy) Fabian Peroni	Audi A4 Quattro	1.59.142	
7	60	(Italy) Emanuele Moncini	Alfa Romeo 155	1.59.192	
8	53	(Italy) Gianluca Roda	Alfa Romeo 155	1.59.550	
9	58	(Portugal) Miguel Ramos	BMW 320i	2.00.136	
10	55	(Italy) Davide Bernasconi	Audi A4 Quattro	2.00.358	
11	52	(Italy) Moreno Soli	Audi A4 Quattro	2.01.268	
12	4	(Italy) Nicola Larini	Alfa Romeo 156	2.01.401	
13	5	(Italy) Rinaldo Capello	Audi A4	2.08.333	
14	51	(Italy) Massimo Pigoli	Honda Accord	no time	

Race 1

Pos	No	Driver	Constructor	Time/Retired	Points
1	3	(Italy) Fabrizio Giovanardi	Alfa Romeo 156	11 laps in 21:40.208	20
2	2	(Italy) Fabrizio De Simone	BMW 320i	+0.381s	15
3	1	(Italy) Emanuele Naspetti	BMW 320i	+9.078s	12
4	4	(Italy) Nicola Larini	Alfa Romeo 156	+12.207s	10
5	56	(Italy) Sandro Sardelli	BMW 320i	+25.555s	8
6	5	(Italy) Rinaldo Capello	Audi A4	+26.937s	6
7	59	(Italy) Christian Pescatori	Alfa Romeo 155	+29.174s	4
8	54	(Italy) Fabian Peroni	Audi A4 Quattro	+30.168s	3
9	60	(Italy) Emanuele Moncini	Alfa Romeo 155	+37.221s	2
10	55	(Italy) Davide Bernasconi	Audi A4 Quattro	+40.101s	1
11	51	(Italy) Massimo Pigoli	Honda Accord	+42.969	
12	58	(Portugal) Miguel Ramos	BMW 320i	+43.187s	
13	52	(Italy) Moreno Soli	Audi A4 Quattro	+44.944s	
14	53	(Italy) Gianluca Roda	Alfa Romeo 155	+2 laps	

Race 2

Pos	No	Driver	Constructor	Time/Retired	Points
1	2	(Italy) Fabrizio De Simone	BMW 320i	21 laps in 41:19.664	40
2	1	(Italy) Emanuele Naspetti	BMW 320i	+0.449s	30
3	3	(Italy) Fabrizio Giovanardi	Alfa Romeo 156	+1.544s	24
4	4	(Italy) Nicola Larini	Alfa Romeo 156	+9.795s	20
5	5	(Italy) Rinaldo Capello	Audi A4	+28.310s	16
6	56	(Italy) Sandro Sardelli	BMW 320i	+53.250s	12
7	54	(Italy) Fabian Peroni	Audi A4 Quattro	+57.369s	8
8	59	(Italy) Christian Pescatori	Alfa Romeo 155	+59.075s	6
9	52	(Italy) Moreno Soli	Audi A4 Quattro	+1.22.701s	4
10	55	(Italy) Davide Bernasconi	Audi A4 Quattro	+1.38.142s	2
11	53	(Italy) Gianluca Roda	Alfa Romeo 155	+1.56.874s	
12	58	(Portugal) Miguel Ramos	BMW 320i	+1 lap	
13	60	(Italy) Emanuele Moncini	Alfa Romeo 155	+2 laps	
DNS	51	(Italy) Massimo Pigoli	Honda Accord		

=== Championship standings after Round 2 ===
Drivers' Championship standings

Pos	Driver	Points
1	(Italy) Emanuele Naspetti	97
2	(Italy) Fabrizio Giovanardi	88
3	(Italy) Fabrizio De Simone	77
4	(Italy) Nicola Larini	62
5	(Italy) Rinaldo Capello	48

Constructors' Championship standings

Pos	Constructor	Points
1	(Germany) BMW	196
2	(Italy) Alfa Romeo	177
3	(Germany) Audi	98

== Round 3 (Italy) Monza ==
Qualifying

Pos	No	Driver	Car	Lap Time	Points
1	3	(Italy) Fabrizio Giovanardi	Alfa Romeo 156	1.51.708	2
2	4	(Italy) Nicola Larini	Alfa Romeo 156	1.52.122	
3	5	(Italy) Rinaldo Capello	Audi A4	1.52.488	
4	2	(Italy) Fabrizio De Simone	BMW 320i	1.52.531	
5	1	(Italy) Emanuele Naspetti	BMW 320i	1.54.013	
6	59	(Italy) Christian Pescatori	Alfa Romeo 155	1.54.776	
7	54	(Italy) Fabian Peroni	Audi A4 Quattro	1.55.671	
8	51	(Italy) Massimo Pigoli	Honda Accord	1.55.855	
9	58	(Portugal) Miguel Ramos	BMW 320i	1.56.466	
10	53	(Italy) Gianluca Roda	Alfa Romeo 155	1.56.621	
11	60	(Italy) Emanuele Moncini	Alfa Romeo 155	1.56.795	
12	56	(Italy) Sandro Sardelli	BMW 320i	1.56.799	
13	52	(Italy) Moreno Soli	Audi A4 Quattro	1.57.981	
14	55	(Italy) Davide Bernasconi	Audi A4 Quattro	1.59.098	
15	62	(Italy) Guido Lucchetti Cigarini	Opel Vectra	no time	

Race 1

Pos	No	Driver	Constructor	Time/Retired	Points
1	4	(Italy) Nicola Larini	Alfa Romeo 156	8 laps in 15:14.912	20
2	5	(Italy) Rinaldo Capello	Audi A4	+1.285s	15
3	3	(Italy) Fabrizio Giovanardi	Alfa Romeo 156	+1.927s	12
4	2	(Italy) Fabrizio De Simone	BMW 320i	+3.686s	10
5	54	(Italy) Fabian Peroni	Audi A4 Quattro	+21.948s	8
6	51	(Italy) Massimo Pigoli	Honda Accord	+22.868s	6
7	59	(Italy) Christian Pescatori	Alfa Romeo 155	+25.042s	4
8	1	(Italy) Emanuele Naspetti	BMW 320i	+25.292s	3
9	60	(Italy) Emanuele Moncini	Alfa Romeo 155	+26.304s	2
10	56	(Italy) Sandro Sardelli	BMW 320i	+27.120s	1
11	53	(Italy) Gianluca Roda	Alfa Romeo 155	+30.261s	
12	58	(Portugal) Miguel Ramos	BMW 320i	+37.122s	
13	52	(Italy) Moreno Soli	Audi A4 Quattro	+37.334s	
14	55	(Italy) Davide Bernasconi	Audi A4 Quattro	+1.46.755s	
DNS	62	(Italy) Guido Lucchetti Cigarini	Opel Vectra		

Race 2

Pos	No	Driver	Constructor	Time/Retired	Points
1	3	(Italy) Fabrizio Giovanardi	Alfa Romeo 156	18 laps in 34:14.889	40
2	4	(Italy) Nicola Larini	Alfa Romeo 156	+0.381s	30
3	5	(Italy) Rinaldo Capello	Audi A4	+4.296s	24
4	1	(Italy) Emanuele Naspetti	BMW 320i	+9.823s	20
5	54	(Italy) Fabian Peroni	Audi A4 Quattro	+53.132s	16
6	58	(Portugal) Miguel Ramos	BMW 320i	+1.02.403s	12
7	60	(Italy) Emanuele Moncini	Alfa Romeo 155	+1.04.738s	8
8	55	(Italy) Davide Bernasconi	Audi A4 Quattro	+1.38.142s	6
9	52	(Italy) Moreno Soli	Audi A4 Quattro	+1 lap	4
10 DNF	2	(Italy) Fabrizio De Simone	BMW 320i	+6laps	2
11 DNF	62	(Italy) Guido Lucchetti Cigarini	Opel Vectra	+8 laps	
12 DNF	59	(Italy) Christian Pescatori	Alfa Romeo 155	+9 laps	
DNF	51	(Italy) Massimo Pigoli	Honda Accord	+15 laps	
DNF	53	(Italy) Gianluca Roda	Alfa Romeo 155	+16 laps	
DNS	56	(Italy) Sandro Sardelli	BMW 320i		

=== Championship standings after Round 3 ===
Drivers' Championship standings

Pos	Driver	Points
1	(Italy) Fabrizio Giovanardi	142
2	(Italy) Emanuele Naspetti	120
3	(Italy) Nicola Larini	112
4	(Italy) Fabrizio De Simone	89
5	(Italy) Rinaldo Capello	87

Constructors' Championship standings

Pos	Constructor	Points
1	(Italy) Alfa Romeo	291
2	(Germany) BMW	244
3	(Germany) Audi	167
4	(Japan) Honda	6

== Round 4 (Italy) Varano De Melegari ==
Qualifying

Pos	No	Driver	Car	Lap Time	Points
1	3	(Italy) Fabrizio Giovanardi	Alfa Romeo 156	47.952	2
2	1	(Italy) Emanuele Naspetti	BMW 320i	48.066	
3	2	(Italy) Fabrizio De Simone	BMW 320i	48.256	
4	4	(Italy) Nicola Larini	Alfa Romeo 156	48.266	
5	5	(Italy) Rinaldo Capello	Audi A4	48.306	
6	54	(Italy) Fabian Peroni	Audi A4 Quattro	48.652	
7	58	(Portugal) Miguel Ramos	BMW 320i	48.944	
8	59	(Italy) Christian Pescatori	Alfa Romeo 155	48.954	
9	56	(Italy) Sandro Sardelli	BMW 320i	49.025	
10	60	(Italy) Emanuele Moncini	Alfa Romeo 155	49.193	
11	55	(Italy) Davide Bernasconi	Audi A4 Quattro	49.302	
12	54	(Italy) Moreno Soli	Audi A4 Quattro	49.303	
13	51	(Italy) Massimo Pigoli	Honda Accord	50.002	
14	53	(Italy) Gianluca Roda	Alfa Romeo 155	50.502	
15	62	(Italy) Guido Lucchetti Cigarini	Opel Vectra	52.687	

Race 1

Pos	No	Driver	Constructor	Time/Retired	Points
1	1	(Italy) Emanuele Naspetti	BMW 320i	21 laps in 17:15.326	20
2	2	(Italy) Fabrizio De Simone	BMW 320i	+1.042s	15
3	4	(Italy) Nicola Larini	Alfa Romeo 156	+9.683s	12
4	54	(Italy) Fabian Peroni	Audi A4 Quattro	+16.723s	10
5	3	(Italy) Fabrizio Giovanardi	Alfa Romeo 156	+19.049s	8
6	5	(Italy) Rinaldo Capello	Audi A4	+19.454s	6
7	56	(Italy) Sandro Sardelli	BMW 320i	+26.089s	4
8	58	(Portugal) Miguel Ramos	BMW 320i	+28.123s	3
9	60	(Italy) Emanuele Moncini	Alfa Romeo 155	+30.019s	2
10	52	(Italy) Moreno Soli	Audi A4 Quattro	+31.478s	1
11	55	(Italy) Davide Bernasconi	Audi A4 Quattro	+32.569s	
12	59	(Italy) Christian Pescatori	Alfa Romeo 155	+50.211s	
13	53	(Italy) Gianluca Roda	Alfa Romeo 155	+1 lap	
14	51	(Italy) Massimo Pigoli	Honda Accord	+1 lap	
15	62	(Italy) Guido Lucchetti Cigarini	Opel Vectra	+1 lap	

Race 2

Pos	No	Driver	Constructor	Time/Retired	Points
1	1	(Italy) Emanuele Naspetti	BMW 320i	56 laps in 46:15.174	40
2	3	(Italy) Fabrizio Giovanardi	Alfa Romeo 156	+31.554s	30
3	4	(Italy) Nicola Larini	Alfa Romeo 156	+39.200s	24
4	54	(Italy) Fabian Peroni	Audi A4 Quattro	+1 lap	20
5	5	(Italy) Rinaldo Capello	Audi A4	+1 lap	16
6	58	(Portugal) Miguel Ramos	BMW 320i	+1 lap	12
7	56	(Italy) Sandro Sardelli	BMW 320i	+2 laps	8
8	52	(Italy) Moreno Soli	Audi A4 Quattro	+4 laps	6
9	59	(Italy) Christian Pescatori	Alfa Romeo 155	+5 laps	4
10	55	(Italy) Davide Bernasconi	Audi A4 Quattro	+9 laps	2
DNF	60	(Italy) Emanuele Moncini	Alfa Romeo 155	+31 laps	
DNF	53	(Italy) Gianluca Roda	Alfa Romeo 155	+36 laps	
DNF	2	(Italy) Fabrizio De Simone	BMW 320i	+41 laps	
DNF	51	(Italy) Massimo Pigoli	Honda Accord	+48 laps	
DNF	62	(Italy) Guido Lucchetti Cigarini	Opel Vectra	+50 laps	

=== Championship standings after Round 4 ===
Drivers' Championship standings

Pos	Driver	Points
1	(Italy) Fabrizio Giovanardi	182
2	(Italy) Emanuele Naspetti	180
3	(Italy) Nicola Larini	148
4	(Italy) Rinaldo Capello	109
5	(Italy) Fabrizio De Simone	104

Constructors' Championship standings

Pos	Constructor	Points
1	(Italy) Alfa Romeo	371
2	(Germany) BMW	343
3	(Germany) Audi	226
4	(Japan) Honda	6

== Round 5 (Italy) Vallelunga ==
Qualifying

Pos	No	Driver	Car	Lap Time	Points
1	3	(Italy) Fabrizio Giovanardi	Alfa Romeo 156	1.14.527	2
2	4	(Italy) Nicola Larini	Alfa Romeo 156	1.14.870	
3	1	(Italy) Emanuele Naspetti	BMW 320i	1.14.993	
4	5	(Italy) Rinaldo Capello	Audi A4	1.15.203	
5	2	(Italy) Fabrizio De Simone	BMW 320i	1.15.222	
6	59	(Italy) Christian Pescatori	Alfa Romeo 155	1.16.212	
7	56	(Italy) Sandro Sardelli	BMW 320i	1.16.545	
8	60	(Italy) Emanuele Moncini	Alfa Romeo 155	1.16.613	
9	58	(Portugal) Miguel Ramos	BMW 320i	1.16.633	
10	54	(Italy) Fabian Peroni	Audi A4 Quattro	1.17.154	
11	53	(Italy) Gianluca Roda	Alfa Romeo 155	1.17.717	
12	52	(Italy) Moreno Soli	Audi A4 Quattro	1.17.970	
13	55	(Italy) Davide Bernasconi	Audi A4 Quattro	1.18.114	
14	62	(Italy) Guido Lucchetti Cigarini	Opel Vectra	1.20.279	

Race 1

Pos	No	Driver	Constructor	Time/Retired	Points
1	1	(Italy) Emanuele Naspetti	BMW 320i	16 laps in 20:27.224	20
2	3	(Italy) Fabrizio Giovanardi	Alfa Romeo 156	+0.957s	15
3	2	(Italy) Fabrizio De Simone	BMW 320i	+6.425s	12
4	4	(Italy) Nicola Larini	Alfa Romeo 156	+7.406s	10
5	5	(Italy) Rinaldo Capello	Audi A4	+18.125s	8
6	56	(Italy) Sandro Sardelli	BMW 320i	+27.884s	6
7	54	(Italy) Fabian Peroni	Audi A4 Quattro	+30.648s	4
8	58	(Portugal) Miguel Ramos	BMW 320i	+31.710s	3
9	59	(Italy) Christian Pescatori	Alfa Romeo 155	+25.042s	2
10	60	(Italy) Emanuele Moncini	Alfa Romeo 155	+26.304s	1
11	52	(Italy) Moreno Soli	Audi A4 Quattro	+44.353s	
12	55	(Italy) Davide Bernasconi	Audi A4 Quattro	+50.944s	
13	53	(Italy) Gianluca Roda	Alfa Romeo 155	+56.944s	
14	62	(Italy) Guido Lucchetti Cigarini	Opel Vectra	+2 laps	

Race 2

Pos	No	Driver	Constructor	Time/Retired	Points
1	1	(Italy) Emanuele Naspetti	BMW 320i	32 laps in 41:49.450	40
2	5	(Italy) Rinaldo Capello	Audi A4	+2.172s	30
3	56	(Italy) Sandro Sardelli	BMW 320i	+12.771s	24
4	58	(Portugal) Miguel Ramos	BMW 320i	+24.028s	20
5	60	(Italy) Emanuele Moncini	Alfa Romeo 155	+38.316s	16
6	52	(Italy) Moreno Soli	Audi A4 Quattro	+1.07.021s	12
7	55	(Italy) Davide Bernasconi	Audi A4 Quattro	+1.09.210s	8
8	54	(Italy) Fabian Peroni	Audi A4 Quattro	+1 lap	6
9	53	(Italy) Gianluca Roda	Alfa Romeo 155	+8 laps	4
10	2	(Italy) Fabrizio De Simone	BMW 320i	+9 laps	2
DSQ	3	(Italy) Fabrizio Giovanardi	Alfa Romeo 156	+25 laps	
DNF	62	(Italy) Guido Lucchetti Cigarini	Opel Vectra	+25 laps	
DNF	59	(Italy) Christian Pescatori	Alfa Romeo 155	+27 laps	
DNF	4	(Italy) Nicola Larini	Alfa Romeo 156	+32 laps	

=== Championship standings after Round 5 ===
Drivers' Championship standings

Pos	Driver	Points
1	(Italy) Emanuele Naspetti	240
2	(Italy) Fabrizio Giovanardi	199
3	(Italy) Nicola Larini	158
4	(Italy) Rinaldo Capello	147
5	(Italy) Fabrizio De Simone	118

Constructors' Championship standings

Pos	Constructor	Points
1	(Germany) BMW	465
2	(Italy) Alfa Romeo	418
3	(Germany) Audi	288
4	(Japan) Honda	6

== Round 6 (Italy) Magione ==
Qualifying

Pos	No	Driver	Car	Lap Time	Points
1	3	(Italy) Fabrizio Giovanardi	Alfa Romeo 156	1.13.108	2
2	4	(Italy) Nicola Larini	Alfa Romeo 156	1.13.123	
3	1	(Italy) Emanuele Naspetti	BMW 320i	1.13.164	
4	2	(Italy) Fabrizio De Simone	BMW 320i	1.13.324	
5	5	(Italy) Rinaldo Capello	Audi A4	1.13.805	
6	59	(Italy) Christian Pescatori	Alfa Romeo 155	1.14.464	
7	52	(Italy) Moreno Soli	Audi A4 Quattro	1.14.630	
8	54	(Italy) Fabian Peroni	Audi A4 Quattro	1.14.691	
9	58	(Portugal) Miguel Ramos	BMW 320i	1.15.133	
10	56	(Italy) Sandro Sardelli	BMW 320i	1.15.167	
11	60	(Italy) Emanuele Moncini	Alfa Romeo 155	1.15.223	
12	55	(Italy) Davide Bernasconi	Audi A4 Quattro	1.16.280	
13	62	(Italy) Guido Lucchetti Cigarini	Opel Vectra	1.18.473	

Race 1

Pos	No	Driver	Constructor	Time/Retired	Points
1	3	(Italy) Fabrizio Giovanardi	Alfa Romeo 156	20 laps in 27:48.157	20
2	4	(Italy) Nicola Larini	Alfa Romeo 156	+3.807s	15
3	1	(Italy) Emanuele Naspetti	BMW 320i	+4.121s	12
4	2	(Italy) Fabrizio De Simone	BMW 320i	+4.212s	12
5	52	(Italy) Moreno Soli	Audi A4 Quattro	+10.312s	8
6	60	(Italy) Emanuele Moncini	Alfa Romeo 155	+14.125s	6
7	56	(Italy) Sandro Sardelli	BMW 320i	+14.388s	4
8	58	(Portugal) Miguel Ramos	BMW 320i	+14.889s	3
9	55	(Italy) Davide Bernasconi	Audi A4 Quattro	+15.488s	2
10	62	(Italy) Guido Lucchetti Cigarini	Opel Vectra	+1.02.114s	1
11 DNF	5	(Italy) Rinaldo Capello	Audi A4	+8 laps	
DNF	59	(Italy) Christian Pescatori	Alfa Romeo 155	+13 laps	
DNF	54	(Italy) Fabian Peroni	Audi A4 Quattro	+19 laps	

Race 2

Pos	No	Driver	Constructor	Time/Retired	Points
1	2	(Italy) Fabrizio De Simone	BMW 320i	39 laps in 48:53.185	40
2	3	(Italy) Fabrizio Giovanardi	Alfa Romeo 156	+18.686s	30
3	54	(Italy) Fabian Peroni	Audi A4 Quattro	+1.02.421s	24
4	5	(Italy) Rinaldo Capello	Audi A4	+1.06.998s	20
5	52	(Italy) Moreno Soli	Audi A4 Quattro	+1 lap	16
6	55	(Italy) Davide Bernasconi	Audi A4 Quattro	+1 lap	12
7	60	(Italy) Emanuele Moncini	Alfa Romeo 155	+1 lap	8
8	58	(Portugal) Miguel Ramos	BMW 320i	+1 lap	6
9	56	(Italy) Sandro Sardelli	BMW 320i	+1 lap	4
10	4	(Italy) Nicola Larini	Alfa Romeo 156	+2 laps	2
11 DNF	62	(Italy) Guido Lucchetti Cigarini	Opel Vectra	+14 laps	
DNF	1	(Italy) Emanuele Naspetti	BMW 320i	+30 laps	
DNS	59	(Italy) Christian Pescatori	Alfa Romeo 155		

=== Championship standings after Round 6 ===
Drivers' Championship standings

Pos	Driver	Points
1	(Italy) Emanuele Naspetti	252
2	(Italy) Fabrizio Giovanardi	251
3	(Italy) Nicola Larini	175
4	(Italy) Fabrizio De Simone	168
5	(Italy) Rinaldo Capello	167

Constructors' Championship standings

Pos	Constructor	Points
1	(Germany) BMW	541
2	(Italy) Alfa Romeo	499
3	(Germany) Audi	358
4	(Japan) Honda	6
5	(Germany) Opel	1

== Round 7 (Italy) Pergusa ==
Qualifying

Pos	No	Driver	Car	Lap Time	Points
1	3	(Italy) Fabrizio Giovanardi	Alfa Romeo 156	1.42.274	2
2	1	(Italy) Emanuele Naspetti	BMW 320i	1.43.226	
3	4	(Italy) Nicola Larini	Alfa Romeo 156	1.43.367	
4	5	(Italy) Rinaldo Capello	Audi A4	1.44.314	
5	2	(Italy) Fabrizio De Simone	BMW 320i	1.44.509	
6	56	(Italy) Sandro Sardelli	BMW 320i	1.46.192	
7	59	(Italy) Christian Pescatori	Alfa Romeo 155	1.46.425	
8	60	(Italy) Emanuele Moncini	Alfa Romeo 155	1.47.044	
9	58	(Portugal) Miguel Ramos	BMW 320i	1.47.262	
10	54	(Italy) Fabian Peroni	Audi A4 Quattro	1.47.574	
11	52	(Italy) Moreno Soli	Audi A4 Quattro	1.48.046	
12	53	(Italy) Gianluca Roda	Alfa Romeo 155	1.48.647	
13	55	(Italy) Davide Bernasconi	Audi A4 Quattro	1.51.757	

Race 1

Pos	No	Driver	Constructor	Time/Retired	Points
1	3	(Italy) Fabrizio Giovanardi	Alfa Romeo 156	11 laps in 19:16.284	20
2	1	(Italy) Emanuele Naspetti	BMW 320i	+5.418s	15
3	4	(Italy) Nicola Larini	Alfa Romeo 156	+6.032s	12
4	2	(Italy) Fabrizio De Simone	BMW 320i	+6.296s	10
5	5	(Italy) Rinaldo Capello	Audi A4	+6.762s	8
6	59	(Italy) Christian Pescatori	Alfa Romeo 155	+28.241s	6
7	54	(Italy) Fabian Peroni	Audi A4 Quattro	+32.245s	4
8	58	(Portugal) Miguel Ramos	BMW 320i	+36.458s	3
9	52	(Italy) Moreno Soli	Audi A4 Quattro	+41.914s	2
10	55	(Italy) Davide Bernasconi	Audi A4 Quattro	+53.739s	1
11	60	(Italy) Emanuele Moncini	Alfa Romeo 155	+1 lap	
DNF	56	(Italy) Sandro Sardelli	BMW 320i	+9 laps	
DNS	53	(Italy) Gianluca Roda	Alfa Romeo 155		

Race 2

Pos	No	Driver	Constructor	Time/Retired	Points
1	3	(Italy) Fabrizio Giovanardi	Alfa Romeo 156	21 laps in 37:02.133	40
2	4	(Italy) Nicola Larini	Alfa Romeo 156	+0.844s	30
3	1	(Italy) Emanuele Naspetti	BMW 320i	+9.553s	24
4	5	(Italy) Rinaldo Capello	Audi A4	+15.658s	20
5	2	(Italy) Fabrizio De Simone	BMW 320i	+24.699s	16
6	59	(Italy) Christian Pescatori	Alfa Romeo 155	+37.933s	12
7	54	(Italy) Fabian Peroni	Audi A4 Quattro	+49.219s	8
8	60	(Italy) Emanuele Moncini	Alfa Romeo 155	+51,401s	6
9	56	(Italy) Sandro Sardelli	BMW 320i	+54.357s	4
10	52	(Italy) Moreno Soli	Audi A4 Quattro	+1.09.800s	2
11	58	(Portugal) Miguel Ramos	BMW 320i	+1.24.582s	
12	55	(Italy) Davide Bernasconi	Audi A4 Quattro	+1.34.705	
DNS	53	(Italy) Gianluca Roda	Alfa Romeo 155		

=== Championship standings after Round 7 ===
Drivers' Championship standings

Pos	Driver	Points
1	(Italy) Fabrizio Giovanardi	313
2	(Italy) Emanuele Naspetti	291
3	(Italy) Nicola Larini	217
4	(Italy) Rinaldo Capello	195
5	(Italy) Fabrizio De Simone	194

Constructors' Championship standings

Pos	Constructor	Points
1	(Italy) Alfa Romeo	619
2	(Germany) BMW	613
3	(Germany) Audi	402
4	(Japan) Honda	6
5	(Germany) Opel	1

== Round 8 (Italy) Misano Adriatico ==
Qualifying

Pos	No	Driver	Car	Lap Time	Points
1	1	(Italy) Emanuele Naspetti	BMW 320i	1.42.350	2
2	4	(Italy) Nicola Larini	Alfa Romeo 156	1.42.674	
3	54	(Italy) Fabian Peroni	Audi A4 Quattro	1.43.383	
4	5	(Italy) Rinaldo Capello	Audi A4	1.44.274	
5	3	(Italy) Fabrizio Giovanardi	Alfa Romeo 156	1.44.935	
6	51	(Italy) Massimo Pigoli	Honda Accord	1.45.445	
7	59	(Italy) Christian Pescatori	Alfa Romeo 155	1.45.947	
8	2	(Italy) Fabrizio De Simone	BMW 320i	1.46.734	
9	6	(Italy) Roberto Colciago	BMW 320i	1.47.268	
10	60	(Italy) Emanuele Moncini	Alfa Romeo 155	1.47.675	
11	52	(Italy) Moreno Soli	Audi A4 Quattro	1.47.810	
12	58	(Portugal) Miguel Ramos	BMW 320i	1.47.910	
13	56	(Italy) Sandro Sardelli	BMW 320i	1.48.293	
14	55	(Italy) Davide Bernasconi	Audi A4 Quattro	1.48.598	
15	53	(Italy) Gianluca Roda	Alfa Romeo 155	1.53.263	

Race 1

Pos	No	Driver	Constructor	Time/Retired	Points
1	3	(Italy) Fabrizio Giovanardi	Alfa Romeo 156	13 laps in 25:09.303	20
2	4	(Italy) Nicola Larini	Alfa Romeo 156	+0.416s	15
3	2	(Italy) Fabrizio De Simone	BMW 320i	+8.667s	12
4	54	(Italy) Fabian Peroni	Audi A4 Quattro	+18.322s	10
5	6	(Italy) Roberto Colciago	BMW 320i	+22.709s	8
6	59	(Italy) Christian Pescatori	Alfa Romeo 155	+51.013s	6
7	5	(Italy) Rinaldo Capello	Audi A4	+1.08.379s	4
8	55	(Italy) Davide Bernasconi	Audi A4 Quattro	+1.20.276s	3
9	52	(Italy) Moreno Soli	Audi A4 Quattro	+1.34.294s	2
10	56	(Italy) Sandro Sardelli	BMW 320i	+1.59.731s	1
11	58	(Portugal) Miguel Ramos	BMW 320i	+1 lap	
12	53	(Italy) Gianluca Roda	Alfa Romeo 155	+1 lap	
DNF	1	(Italy) Emanuele Naspetti	BMW 320i	+5 laps	
DNF	60	(Italy) Emanuele Moncini	Alfa Romeo 155	+10 laps	
DNF	51	(Italy) Massimo Pigoli	Honda Accord	+11 laps	

Race 2

Pos	No	Driver	Constructor	Time/Retired	Points
1	3	(Italy) Fabrizio Giovanardi	Alfa Romeo 156	25 laps in 41:56.364	40
2	6	(Italy) Roberto Colciago	BMW 320i	+11.297s	30
3	54	(Italy) Fabian Peroni	Audi A4 Quattro	+41.519s	24
4	55	(Italy) Davide Bernasconi	Audi A4 Quattro	+58.590s	20
5	53	(Italy) Gianluca Roda	Alfa Romeo 155	+1.15.470s	16
6	2	(Italy) Fabrizio De Simone	BMW 320i	+1 lap	12
7	59	(Italy) Christian Pescatori	Alfa Romeo 155	+1 lap	8
8	56	(Italy) Sandro Sardelli	BMW 320i	+2 laps	6
9	60	(Italy) Emanuele Moncini	Alfa Romeo 155	+2 laps	4
DSQ	4	(Italy) Nicola Larini	Alfa Romeo 156	+13 laps	
DNF	5	(Italy) Rinaldo Capello	Audi A4	+19 laps	
DNF	1	(Italy) Emanuele Naspetti	BMW 320i	+20 laps	
DNF	51	(Italy) Massimo Pigoli	Honda Accord	+22 laps	
DNF	58	(Portugal) Miguel Ramos	BMW 320i	+23 laps	
DNS	52	(Italy) Moreno Soli	Audi A4 Quattro		

=== Championship standings after Round 8 ===
Drivers' Championship standings

Pos	Driver	Points
1	(Italy) Fabrizio Giovanardi	373
2	(Italy) Emanuele Naspetti	293
3	(Italy) Nicola Larini	232
4	(Italy) Fabrizio De Simone	218
5	(Italy) Rinaldo Capello	199

Constructors' Championship standings

Pos	Constructor	Points
1	(Italy) Alfa Romeo	724
2	(Germany) BMW	682
3	(Germany) Audi	463
4	(Japan) Honda	6
5	(Germany) Opel	1

== Round 9 (Italy) Monza ==
Qualifying

Pos	No	Driver	Car	Lap Time	Points
1	3	(Italy) Fabrizio Giovanardi	Alfa Romeo 156	1.50.085	2
2	4	(Italy) Nicola Larini	Alfa Romeo 156	1.50.704	
3	5	(Italy) Rinaldo Capello	Audi A4	1.50.729	
4	8	(Italy) Stefano Modena	Alfa Romeo 156	1.51.667	
5	1	(Italy) Emanuele Naspetti	BMW 320i	1.51.691	
6	7	(Italy) Antonio Tamburini	Alfa Romeo 156	1.51.706	
7	2	(Italy) Fabrizio De Simone	BMW 320i	1.52.045	
8	6	(Italy) Roberto Colciago	BMW 320i	1.52.308	
9	60	(Italy) Emanuele Moncini	Alfa Romeo 155	1.54.160	
10	59	(Italy) Christian Pescatori	Alfa Romeo 155	1.54.324	
11	54	(Italy) Fabian Peroni	Audi A4 Quattro	1.54.552	
12	56	(Italy) Sandro Sardelli	BMW 320i	1.54.573	
13	58	(Portugal) Miguel Ramos	BMW 320i	1.54.740	
14	51	(Italy) Massimo Pigoli	Honda Accord	1.55.161	
15	52	(Italy) Moreno Soli	Audi A4 Quattro	1.56.726	
16	55	(Italy) Davide Bernasconi	Audi A4 Quattro	1.57.030	
17	53	(Italy) Gianluca Roda	Alfa Romeo 155	1.57.387	
18	62	(Italy) Guido Lucchetti Cigarini	Opel Vectra	2.03.562	

Race 1

Pos	No	Driver	Constructor	Time/Retired	Points
1	3	(Italy) Fabrizio Giovanardi	Alfa Romeo 156	9 laps in 19:09.088	20
2	4	(Italy) Nicola Larini	Alfa Romeo 156	+1.494s	15
3	8	(Italy) Stefano Modena	Alfa Romeo 156	+2.597s	12
4	1	(Italy) Emanuele Naspetti	BMW 320i	+13.876s	10
5	7	(Italy) Antonio Tamburini	Alfa Romeo 156	+14.599s	8
6	5	(Italy) Rinaldo Capello	Audi A4	+15.102s	6
7	2	(Italy) Fabrizio De Simone	BMW 320i	+16.228s	4
8	6	(Italy) Roberto Colciago	BMW 320i	+19.778s	3
9	60	(Italy) Emanuele Moncini	Alfa Romeo 155	+24.618s	2
10	59	(Italy) Christian Pescatori	Alfa Romeo 155	+25.961s	1
11	52	(Italy) Moreno Soli	Audi A4 Quattro	+52.081s	
12	51	(Italy) Massimo Pigoli	Honda Accord	+52.499s	
13	56	(Italy) Sandro Sardelli	BMW 320i	+1.17.018s	
14	62	(Italy) Guido Lucchetti Cigarini	Opel Vectra	+1 lap	
DNF	54	(Italy) Fabian Peroni	Audi A4 Quattro	+4 laps	
DNF	58	(Portugal) Miguel Ramos	BMW 320i	+5 laps	
DNF	55	(Italy) Davide Bernasconi	Audi A4 Quattro	+9 laps	
DNS	53	(Italy) Gianluca Roda	Alfa Romeo 155		

Race 2

Pos	No	Driver	Constructor	Time/Retired	Points
1	3	(Italy) Fabrizio Giovanardi	Alfa Romeo 156	18 laps in 34:09.747	40
2	1	(Italy) Emanuele Naspetti	BMW 320i	+3.530s	30
3	4	(Italy) Nicola Larini	Alfa Romeo 156	+4.518s	24
4	8	(Italy) Stefano Modena	Alfa Romeo 156	+5.269s	20
5	2	(Italy) Fabrizio De Simone	BMW 320i	+8.271s	16
6	7	(Italy) Antonio Tamburini	Alfa Romeo 156	+13.839s	12
7	6	(Italy) Roberto Colciago	BMW 320i	+13.857s	8
8	60	(Italy) Emanuele Moncini	Alfa Romeo 155	+51.298s	6
9	56	(Italy) Sandro Sardelli	BMW 320i	+51.725s	4
10	54	(Italy) Fabian Peroni	Audi A4 Quattro	+56.790s	2
11	59	(Italy) Christian Pescatori	Alfa Romeo 155	+1.25.450s	
12	52	(Italy) Moreno Soli	Audi A4 Quattro	+1.32.556s	
13	62	(Italy) Guido Lucchetti Cigarini	Opel Vectra	+1 lap	
DNF	5	(Italy) Rinaldo Capello	Audi A4	+10 laps	
DNF	51	(Italy) Massimo Pigoli	Honda Accord	+13 laps	
DNF	55	(Italy) Davide Bernasconi	Audi A4 Quattro	+16 laps	
DNS	58	(Portugal) Miguel Ramos	BMW 320i		
DNS	53	(Italy) Gianluca Roda	Alfa Romeo 155		

=== Championship standings after Round 9 ===
Drivers' Championship standings

Pos	Driver	Points
1	(Italy) Fabrizio Giovanardi	435
2	(Italy) Emanuele Naspetti	333
3	(Italy) Nicola Larini	271
4	(Italy) Fabrizio De Simone	238
5	(Italy) Rinaldo Capello	205

Constructors' Championship standings

Pos	Constructor	Points
1	(Italy) Alfa Romeo	855
2	(Germany) BMW	755
3	(Germany) Audi	471
4	(Japan) Honda	6
5	(Germany) Opel	1

== Round 10 (Italy) Vallelunga ==
Qualifying

Pos	No	Driver	Car	Lap Time	Points
1	1	(Italy) Emanuele Naspetti	BMW 320i	1.14.742	2
2	4	(Italy) Nicola Larini	Alfa Romeo 156	1.14.902	
3	3	(Italy) Fabrizio Giovanardi	Alfa Romeo 156	1.14.930	
4	5	(Italy) Rinaldo Capello	Audi A4	1.15.102	
5	7	(Italy) Antonio Tamburini	Alfa Romeo 156	1.15.622	
6	6	(Italy) Roberto Colciago	BMW 320i	1.15.889	
7	59	(Italy) Christian Pescatori	Alfa Romeo 155	1.16.103	
8	58	(Portugal) Miguel Ramos	BMW 320i	1.16.256	
9	56	(Italy) Sandro Sardelli	BMW 320i	1.16.324	
10	60	(Italy) Emanuele Moncini	Alfa Romeo 155	1.16.543	
11	54	(Italy) Fabian Peroni	Audi A4 Quattro	1.16.572	
12	51	(Italy) Massimo Pigoli	Honda Accord	1.16.956	
13	52	(Italy) Moreno Soli	Audi A4 Quattro	1.17.699	
14	62	(Italy) Guido Lucchetti Cigarini	Opel Vectra	1.28.919	

Race 1

Pos	No	Driver	Constructor	Time/Retired	Points
1	4	(Italy) Nicola Larini	Alfa Romeo 156	16 laps in 20:22.769	20
2	6	(Italy) Roberto Colciago	BMW 320i	+1.0108s	15
3	3	(Italy) Fabrizio Giovanardi	Alfa Romeo 156	+2.118s	12
4	5	(Italy) Rinaldo Capello	Audi A4	+6.557s	10
5	7	(Italy) Antonio Tamburini	Alfa Romeo 156	+18.953s	8
6	59	(Italy) Christian Pescatori	Alfa Romeo 155	+26.361s	6
7	56	(Italy) Sandro Sardelli	BMW 320i	+27.214s	4
8	60	(Italy) Emanuele Moncini	Alfa Romeo 155	+33.884s	3
9	58	(Portugal) Miguel Ramos	BMW 320i	+41.137s	2
10	51	(Italy) Massimo Pigoli	Honda Accord	+44.428s	1
11	54	(Italy) Fabian Peroni	Audi A4 Quattro	+50.549s	
12	52	(Italy) Moreno Soli	Audi A4 Quattro	+1.03.740s	
13	62	(Italy) Guido Lucchetti Cigarini	Opel Vectra	+1 lap	
DNF	1	(Italy) Emanuele Naspetti	BMW 320i	+12 laps	

Race 2

Pos	No	Driver	Constructor	Time/Retired	Points
1	4	(Italy) Nicola Larini	Alfa Romeo 156	32 laps in 40:41.028	40
2	6	(Italy) Roberto Colciago	BMW 320i	+3.120s	30
3	3	(Italy) Fabrizio Giovanardi	Alfa Romeo 156	+22.253s	24
4	56	(Italy) Sandro Sardelli	BMW 320i	+32.459s	20
5	7	(Italy) Antonio Tamburini	Alfa Romeo 156	+32.895s	16
6	54	(Italy) Fabian Peroni	Audi A4 Quattro	+59.613s	12
7	60	(Italy) Emanuele Moncini	Alfa Romeo 155	+1.01.171s	8
8	52	(Italy) Moreno Soli	Audi A4 Quattro	+1.02.337 lap	6
9	51	(Italy) Massimo Pigoli	Honda Accord	+44.428s	4
10	58	(Portugal) Miguel Ramos	BMW 320i	+1 lap	2
11	62	(Italy) Guido Lucchetti Cigarini	Opel Vectra	+2 laps	
12 DNF	5	(Italy) Rinaldo Capello	Audi A4	+3 laps	
13 DNF	59	(Italy) Christian Pescatori	Alfa Romeo 155	+4 laps	
14 DNF	1	(Italy) Emanuele Naspetti	BMW 320i	+9 laps	

=== Championship standings after (Final) Round 10 ===
Drivers' Championship standings

Pos	Driver	Points
1	(Italy) Fabrizio Giovanardi	471
1	(Italy) Emanuele Naspetti	335
3	(Italy) Nicola Larini	331
4	(Italy) Fabrizio De Simone	238
5	(Italy) Rinaldo Capello	215

Constructors' Championship standings

Pos	Constructor	Points
1	(Italy) Alfa Romeo	975
2	(Germany) BMW	826
3	(Germany) Audi	499
4	(Japan) Honda	11
5	(Germany) Opel	1

== Championship standings ==
Points system
**Race 1**	**1st**	**2nd**	**3rd**	**4th**	**5th**	**6th**	**7th**	**8th**	**9th**	**10th**	Pole position
	20	15	12	10	8	6	4	3	2	1	2
**Race 2**	**1st**	**2nd**	**3rd**	**4th**	**5th**	**6th**	**7th**	**8th**	**9th**	**10th**	
	40	30	24	20	16	12	8	6	4	2	

=== Drivers' Championship ===
Pos	Driver	Car	BIN (Italy)		IMO (Italy)		MON (Italy)		VAR (Italy)		VAL (Italy)		MAG (Italy)		PER (Italy)		MIS (Italy)		MON (Italy)		VAL (Italy)		Pts
1	(Italy) Fabrizio Giovanardi	Alfa Romeo	3	2	**1**	**3**	**3**	1	**5**	2	**2**	DSQ	**1**	**2**	**1**	**1**	1	**1**	**1**	**1**	3	3	471
2	(Italy) Emanuele Naspetti	BMW	2	1	3	2	8	4	1	**1**	1	**1**	3	Ret	2	3	**Ret**	Ret	4	2	**Ret**	14	335
3	(Italy) Nicola Larini	Alfa Romeo	5	3	4	4	1	**2**	3	3	4	Ret	2	10	3	2	2	DSQ	2	3	1	**1**	331
4	(Italy) Fabrizio de Simone	BMW	**1**	**Ret**	2	1	4	10	2	Ret	3	10	4	1	4	5	3	6	7	5	DNS	DNS	238
5	(Italy) Rinaldo Capello	Audi	6	4	6	5	2	3	6	5	5	2	11	4	5	4	7	Ret	6	Ret	4	12	215
6	(Italy) Fabian Peroni	Audi	4	10	8	7	5	5	4	4	7	8	Ret	3	7	7	4	3	Ret	10	11	6	171
7	(Italy) Sandro Sardelli	BMW	11	Ret	5	6	10	DNS	7	7	6	3	7	9	Ret	9	10	8	13	9	7	4	110
8	(Italy) Roberto Colciago	BMW															5	2	8	7	2	2	94
9	(Italy) Emanuele Moncini	Alfa Romeo	10	8	9	13	9	7	9	Ret	10	5	6	7	11	8	Ret	9	9	8	8	7	81
10	(Italy) Moreno Soli	Audi	7	6	13	9	12	9	10	8	11	6	5	5	9	10	9	DNS	11	12	12	8	79
11	(Italy) Christian Pescatori	Alfa Romeo	8	5	7	8	7	Ret	12	9	9	Ret	Ret	DNS	6	6	6	7	10	11	6	13	78
12	(Portugal) Miguel Ramos	BMW	Ret	9	12	12	12	6	8	6	8	4	8	8	8	11	11	Ret	Ret	DNS	9	10	70
13	(Italy) Davide Bernasconi	Audi	9	7	10	10	13	8	11	10	12	7	9	6	10	12	8	4	Ret	Ret			67
14	(Italy) Antonio Tamburini	Alfa Romeo																	5	6	5	5	44
15	(Italy) Stefano Modena	Alfa Romeo																	3	4			32
16	(Italy) Gianluca Roda	Alfa Romeo	13	Ret	14	11	11	13	Ret	13	13	9			DNS	DNS	12	5	DNS	DNS			20
17	(Italy) Massimo Pigoli	Honda	12	Ret	11	DNS	6	Ret	14	Ret							Ret	Ret	12	Ret	10	9	11
18	(Italy) Guido Lucchetti Cigarini	Opel					DNS	Ret	15	Ret	14	Ret	10	Ret					14	13	13	11	1
Pos	Driver	Car	BIN (Italy)		IMO (Italy)		MON (Italy)		VAR (Italy)		VAL (Italy)		MAG (Italy)		PER (Italy)		MIS (Italy)		MON (Italy)		VAL (Italy)		Pts

Colour	Result
Gold	Winner
Silver	Second place
Bronze	Third place
Green	Points classification
Blue	Non-points classification
Blue	Non-classified finish (NC)
Purple	Retired, not classified (Ret)
Red	Did not qualify (DNQ)
Red	Did not pre-qualify (DNPQ)
Black	Disqualified (DSQ)
White	Did not start (DNS)
White	Withdrew (WD)
White	Race cancelled (C)
Blank	Did not practice (DNP)
Blank	Did not arrive (DNA)
Blank	Excluded (EX)

**Bold** – Pole
Italics – Fastest Lap

=== Manufacturers' Trophy ===
Pos	Manufacturer	Driver	BIN (Italy)		IMO (Italy)		MON (Italy)		VAR (Italy)		VAL (Italy)		MAG (Italy)		PER (Italy)		MIS (Italy)		MON (Italy)		VAL (Italy)		Pts
1	(Italy) Alfa Romeo	(Italy) Fabrizio Giovanardi	3	2	1	3	3	1	5	2	2	DSQ	1	2	1	1	1	1	1	1	3	3	975
1	(Italy) Alfa Romeo	(Italy) Nicola Larini	5	3	4	4	1	2	3	3	4	Ret	2	10	3	2	2	DSQ	2	3	1	1	975
1	(Italy) Alfa Romeo	(Italy) Antonio Tamburini																	5	6	5	5	975
1	(Italy) Alfa Romeo	(Italy) Stefano Modena																	3	4			975
1	(Italy) Alfa Romeo	(Italy) Gianluca Roda	13	Ret	14	11	11	13	Ret	13	13	9			DNS	DNS	12	5	DNS	DNS			975
1	(Italy) Alfa Romeo	(Italy) Christian Pescatori	8	5	7	8	7	Ret	12	9	9	Ret	Ret	DNS	6	6	6	7	10	11	6	13	975
1	(Italy) Alfa Romeo	(Italy) Emanuele Moncini	10	8	9	13	9	7	9	Ret	10	5	6	7	11	8	Ret	9	9	8	8	7	975
2	(Germany) BMW	(Italy) Emanuele Naspetti	2	1	3	2	8	4	1	1	1	1	3	Ret	2	3	Ret	Ret	4	2	Ret	14	826
2	(Germany) BMW	(Italy) Fabrizio De Simone	1	Ret	2	1	4	10	2	Ret	3	10	4	1	4	5	3	6	7	5	DNS	DNS	826
2	(Germany) BMW	(Italy) Sandro Sardelli	11	Ret	5	6	10	DNS	7	7	6	3	7	9	Ret	9	10	8	13	9	7	4	826
2	(Germany) BMW	(Portugal) Miguel Ramos	Ret	9	12	12	12	6	8	6	8	4	8	8	8	11	11	Ret	Ret	DNS	9	10	826
2	(Germany) BMW	(Italy) Roberto Colciago															5	2	8	7	2	2	826
3	(Germany) Audi	(Italy) Rinaldo Capello	6	4	6	5	2	3	6	5	5	2	11	4	5	4	7	Ret	6	Ret	4	12	499
3	(Germany) Audi	(Italy) Fabian Peroni	4	10	8	7	5	5	4	4	7	8	Ret	3	7	7	4	3	Ret	10	11	6	499
3	(Germany) Audi	(Italy) Davide Bernasconi	9	7	10	10	13	8	11	10	12	7	9	6	10	12	8	4	Ret	Ret			499
3	(Germany) Audi	(Italy) Moreno Soli	7	6	13	9	12	9	10	8	11	6	5	5	9	10	9	DNS	11	12	12	8	499
4	(Japan) Honda	(Italy) Massimo Pigoli	12	Ret	11	DNS	6	Ret	14	Ret							Ret	Ret	12	Ret	10	9	11
5	(Germany) Opel	(Italy) Guido Lucchetti Cigarini					DNS	Ret	15	Ret	14	Ret	10	Ret					14	13	13	11	1

Colour	Result
Gold	Winner
Silver	Second place
Bronze	Third place
Green	Points classification
Blue	Non-points classification
Blue	Non-classified finish (NC)
Purple	Retired, not classified (Ret)
Red	Did not qualify (DNQ)
Red	Did not pre-qualify (DNPQ)
Black	Disqualified (DSQ)
White	Did not start (DNS)
White	Withdrew (WD)
White	Race cancelled (C)
Blank	Did not practice (DNP)
Blank	Did not arrive (DNA)
Blank	Excluded (EX)

- only the best 3 cars for every manufacture scored points in each race.

=== Privateers' Championship ===
Pos	Driver	Car	BIN (Italy)		IMO (Italy)		MON (Italy)		VAR (Italy)		VAL (Italy)		MAG (Italy)		PER (Italy)		MIS (Italy)		MON (Italy)		VAL (Italy)		Pts
1	(Italy) Fabian Peroni	Audi	1	6	3	2	1	1	1	1	2	6	Ret	1	2	2	1	1	Ret	3	6	2	426
2	(Italy) Sandro Sardelli	BMW	6	Ret	1	1	8	DNS	2	3	1	1	3	6	Ret	4	5	5	5	2	2	1	334
3	(Italy) Emanuele Moncini	Alfa Romeo	8	4	4	3	4	3	4	Ret	5	3	2	4	6	3	Ret	6	1	1	3	3	293
4	(Italy) Christian Pescatori	Alfa Romeo	3	1	2	3	3	7	7	5	4	Ret	Ret	DNS	1	1	2	4	2	4	1	6	289
5	(Italy) Moreno Soli	Audi	2	2	8	4	8	5	5	4	6	4	1	2	4	5	4	DNS	3	5	7	4	279
6	(Portugal) Miguel Ramos	BMW	9	5	7	7	7	2	3	2	3	2	4	5	6	3	6	Ret	Ret	DNS	4	6	226
7	(Italy) Davide Bernasconi	Audi	4	3	5	5	9	4	6	6	7	5	5	3	5	7	3	2	Ret	Ret			208
8	(Italy) Gianluca Roda	Alfa Romeo	8	Ret	9	6	6	Ret	8	Ret	8	7			DNS	DNS	7	3	DNS	DNS			73
9	(Italy) Massimo Pigoli	Honda	7	Ret	6	DNS	2	Ret	9	Ret							Ret	Ret	4	Ret	5	5	61
10	(Italy) Guido Lucchetti Cigarini	Opel					DNS	6	10	Ret	9	Ret	6	Ret					6	6	8	7	39
Pos	Driver	Car	BIN (Italy)		IMO (Italy)		MON (Italy)		VAR (Italy)		VAL (Italy)		MAG (Italy)		PER (Italy)		MIS (Italy)		MON (Italy)		VAL (Italy)		Pts

Colour	Result
Gold	Winner
Silver	Second place
Bronze	Third place
Green	Points classification
Blue	Non-points classification
Blue	Non-classified finish (NC)
Purple	Retired, not classified (Ret)
Red	Did not qualify (DNQ)
Red	Did not pre-qualify (DNPQ)
Black	Disqualified (DSQ)
White	Did not start (DNS)
White	Withdrew (WD)
White	Race cancelled (C)
Blank	Did not practice (DNP)
Blank	Did not arrive (DNA)
Blank	Excluded (EX)

**Bold** – Pole
Italics – Fastest Lap
