= Antonio Tamburini (racing driver) =

Italian racing driver

Antonio Tamburini (born 15 September 1966) is an Italian former racing driver. He has competed in various single-seater and touring car championships before retiring in 1998. He tested Formula One car for AGS in 1991, as well as raced for Andrea Moda Formula in non-championship Formula One Indoor Trophy the same year.

Although he was competitive, Tamburini's career was overshadowed by other contemporary Italian drivers such as Gabriele Tarquini, Fabrizio Giovanardi and Sandro Montani.

== Racing career ==
=== Complete International Formula 3000 results ===
(key) (Races in bold indicate pole position) (Races in italics indicate fastest lap)

Year	Entrant	Chassis	Engine	Tyres	1	2	3	4	5	6	7	8	9	10	11	DC	Pts
1990	Roni Motorsport	Reynard 90D	Ford Cosworth	A	DON; 4	SIL; 9	PAU; Ret	JER; 13	MNZ; 8	PER; 8	HOC; NQ	BRH; Ret	BIR; Ret	BUG; 16	NOG; 4	14th	6
1991	Pacific Racing	Reynard 91D	Mugen Honda	A	VAL; 3	PAU; 10	JER; 4	MUG; 7	PER; 4	HOC; 6	BRH; 5	SPA; Ret	BUG; 1	NOG; Ret		4th	22
1993	Mönninghoff Racing	Reynard 92D	Ford Cosworth	A	DON; 11	SIL; Ret	PAU; Ret	PER	HOC	NÜR	SPA	MAG	NOG			NC	0

=== Complete Italian Superturismo Championship results ===
Year	Team	Car	Class	1	2	3	4	5	6	7	8	9	10	11	12	13	14	15	16	17	18	19	20	DC	Pts
1992	Jolly Club	Alfa Romeo 155 GTA	S1	MNZ; 1; 5	MNZ; 2; 13	MAG; 1; 6	MAG; 2; 5	MUG; 1; 3	MUG; 2; 4	BIN; 1; 3	BIN; 2; 4	VAL; 1; 5	VAL; 2; 5	IMO; 1 Ret	IMO; 2; 5	MIS; 1; 2	MIS; 2; 2	PER; 1; 3	PER; 2; 2	VAR; 1; 5	VAR; 2; 4	MNZ; 1; 3	MNZ; 2; 1	4th	197
1994	Nordauto Engineering	Alfa Romeo 155 TS		MNZ; 1; 1	MNZ; 2; 1	VAL; 1; 3	VAL; 2; 10	MAG; 1; 8	MAG; 2; 5	BIN; 1; 6	BIN; 2; 14	MIS; 1; 1	MIS; 2; 1	VAL; 1; 4	VAL; 2 Ret	MUG; 1; 3	MUG; 2 Ret	PER; 1; 1	PER; 2; 1	VAR; 1; 5	VAR; 2; 10	MUG; 1 Ret	MUG; 2; 9	2nd	182
1995	Nordauto Engineering	Alfa Romeo 155 TS		MIS; 1; 4	MIS; 2; 3	BIN; 1 Ret	BIN; 2; 6	MNZ; 1; 3	MNZ; 2; 5	IMO; 1; 4	IMO; 2; 4	MAG; 1; 4	MAG; 2; 5	MUG; 1; 4	MUG; 2; 4	MIS; 1; 6	MIS; 2; 2	PER; 1; 4	PER; 2; 3	VAR; 1 Ret	VAR; 2; 6	VAL; 1; 3	VAL; 2; 3	4th	179
1997	Nordauto Engineering	Alfa Romeo 155 TS		MNZ; 1	MNZ; 2	MUG; 1; 4	MUG; 2; 3	MAG; 1; 4	MAG; 2; 4	IMO; 1; 11	IMO; 2; 4	IMO; 1; 1	IMO; 2; 5	BIN; 1; 10	BIN; 2; 9	PER; 1; 12	PER; 2; 6	VAR; 1; 4	VAR; 2; 4	MIS; 1; 4	MIS; 2; 6	VAL; 1; 5	VAL; 2; 5	6th	140
1998	Nordauto Engineering	Alfa Romeo 156		BIN; 1	BIN; 2	IMO; 1	IMO; 2	MNZ; 1	MNZ; 2	VAR; 1	VAR; 2	VAL; 1	VAL; 2	MAG; 1	MAG; 2	PER; 1	PER; 2	MIS; 1	MIS; 2	MNZ; 1; 5	MNZ; 2; 6	VAL; 1; 5	VAL; 2; 5	14th	44

=== Complete Campeonato de España de Turismos ===
(key) (Races in bold indicate pole position) (Races in italics indicate fastest lap)

Year	Team	Car	1	2	3	4	5	6	7	8	9	10	Pos.	Pts
1997	Nordauto Engineering	Alfa Romeo 155 TS	BAR; 1; 1	BAR; 2; 2	ALC; 1; 3	ALC; 2; 3	ALB; 1	ALB; 2	JAR; 1	JAR; 2	BAR; 1	BAR; 2	2nd	59

Sporting positions
Preceded by Enrico Bertaggia	Monaco Formula Three Support; Race Winner; 1989	Succeeded by Laurent Aïello
