= Moreno Soli =

Italian racing driver

Moreno Soli (born 27 January 1951 in Bologna) is a former Italian racing driver.

== Career ==
The entirety of his career has been spent in touring car racing. He was the only driver who participated to all season of the Italian Superturismo Championship from 1987 until 1999 driving always for Alfa Romeo excepct for the season 1998 where he switch for one year to Audi A4 Quattro. He was independent champion in Italian Superturismo 1994 and finished 2nd in 1996 and 1997.

He also participated to the first season of European Super Touring Cup in 2000 which was his last full season as racing driver.

=== Complete Italian Superturismo Championship results ===
Year	Team	Car	Class	1	2	3	4	5	6	7	8	9	10	11	12	13	14	15	16	17	18	19	20	DC	Pts
1992	Soli Racing Team	Alfa Romeo 75	S1	MNZ; 1; 7	MNZ; 2; 5	MAG; 1; 9	MAG; 2; 8	MUG; 1 Ret	MUG; 2 Ret	BIN; 1; 9	BIN; 2; 6	VAL; 1; 8	VAL; 2; 6	IMO; 1; 10	IMO; 2 Ret	MIS; 1; 7	MIS; 2; 9	PER; 1; 7	PER; 2; 4	VAR; 1; 10	VAR; 2; 8	MNZ; 1; 10	MNZ; 2 Ret	8th	60
1993	Soli Racing Team	Alfa Romeo 155 TS		MNZ; 1	MNZ; 2	VAL; 1	VAL; 2	MIS; 1	MIS; 2	MAG; 1	MAG; 2	BIN; 1	BIN; 2	IMO; 1; 14	IMO; 2; 11	VAR; 1; 17	VAR; 2; 12	MIS; 1 Ret	MIS; 2; 10	PER; 1; 11	PER; 2; 10	MUG; 1	MUG; 2	28th	2
1994	Soli Racing Team	Alfa Romeo 155 TS		MNZ; 1; 18	MNZ; 2 Ret	VAL; 1; 12	VAL; 2; 11	MAG; 1; 13	MAG; 2; 13	BIN; 1; 14	BIN; 2; 17	MIS; 1; 12	MIS; 2; 8	VAL; 1; 11	VAL; 2; 10	MUG; 1 Ret	MUG; 2; 13	PER; 1; 11	PER; 2'; 11	VAR; 1; 11	VAR; 2; 13	MUG; 1; 11	MUG; 2; 8	24th	5,5
1995	Soli Racing Team	Alfa Romeo 155 TS		MIS; 1; 13	MIS; 2 Ret	BIN; 1; 10	BIN; 2; 14	MNZ; 1; 12	MNZ; 2; 10	IMO; 1; 11	IMO; 2 Ret	MAG; 1; 13	MAG; 2; 13	MUG; 1; 11	MUG; 2 Ret	MIS; 1; 13	MIS; 2; 9	PER; 1; 6	PER; 2; 11	VAR; 1; 7	VAR; 2; 13	VAL; 1; 13	VAL; 2; 12	14th	14
1996	Soli Racing Team	Alfa Romeo 155 TS		MUG; 1; 11	MUG; 2; 10	MAG; 1; 10	MAG; 2; 8	MNZ; 1; 14	MNZ; 2; 8	BIN; 1 Ret	BIN; 2; 12	MIS; 1; 16	MIS; 2; 14	IMO; 1; 9	IMO; 2; 10	PER; 1; 8	PER; 2; 8	PER; 1; 10	PER; 2; 7	VAR; 1; 8	VAR; 2; 8	VAL; 1; 14	VAL; 2; 12	10th	28
1997	Soli Racing Team	Alfa Romeo 155 TS		MNZ; 1 Ret	MNZ; 2; 6	MUG; 1; 9	MUG; 2; 5	MAG; 1; 8	MAG; 2; 10	IMO; 1; 8	IMO; 2; 8	IMO; 1; 10	IMO; 2; 12	BIN; 1; 6	BIN; 2; 7	PER; 1; 7	PER; 2 Ret	VAR; 1; 7	VAR; 2; 8	MIS; 1; 8	MIS; 2; 9	VAL; 1; 9	VAL; 2; 9	9th	57
1998	Soli Racing Team	Audi A4 Quattro		BIN; 1; 7	BIN; 2; 6	IMO; 1; 13	IMO; 2; 9	MNZ; 1; 12	MNZ; 2; 9	VAR; 1; 10	VAR; 2; 8	VAL; 1; 11	VAL; 2; 6	MAG; 1; 5	MAG; 2; 5	PER; 1; 9	PER; 2; 10	MIS; 1; 9	MIS; 2 DNS	MNZ; 1; 11	MNZ; 2; 12	VAL; 1; 12	VAL; 2; 8	10th	79
1999	Soli Racing Team	Alfa Romeo 155 TS		MIS; 1; 8	MIS; 2; 7	BIN; 1; 10	BIN; 2; 9	IMO; 1; 8	IMO; 2; 6	PER; 1; 9	PER; 2; 9	MAG; 1; 9	MAG; 2; 8	MUG; 1; 9	MUG; 2; 9	MIS; 1; 9	MIS; 2; 10	VAR; 1; 5	VAR; 2; 7	MNZ; 1; 8	MNZ; 2; 7	VAL; 1; 10	VAL; 2 Ret	9th	83

=== Complete European Touring Car Championship results ===
(key)

Year	Team	Car	1	2	3	4	5	6	7	8	9	10	11	12	13	14	15	16	17	18	19	20	DC	Pts
2000	Soli Racing Team	Alfa Romeo 156	MUG; 1; 11	MUG; 2; 14	PER; 1; 11	PER; 2; 10	A1R; 1; 15	A1R; 2; 7	MNZ; 1; 6	MNZ; 2; 5	HUN; 1; 14	HUN; 2; 13	IMO; 1; 14	IMO; 2; 14	MIS; 1; 11	MIS; 2; 13	BRN; 1; 12	BRN; 2; 11	VAL; 1 Ret	VAL; 2; 15	MOB; 1; 12	MOB; 2; 7	10th	23
2001	GDL Racing	BMW 320i	MNZ; 1	MNZ; 2	BRN; 1	BRN; 2	MAG; 1	MAG; 2	SIL; 1	SIL; 2	ZOL; 1	ZOL; 2	HUN; 1; 11	HUN; 2; 10	A1R; 1 Ret	A1R; 2; 11	NÜR; 1; 13	NÜR; 2; 13	JAR; 1; 10	JAR; 2; 13	EST; 1	EST; 2	18th	136

=== Complete FIA GT Championship results ===
Year	Team	Car	Class	1	2	3	4	5	6	7	8	9	10	DC	Pts
2002	MAC Racing	Porsche 911 GT3-RS	N-GT	MAG	SIL	BRN	JAR; 9	AND	OSC; 10	SPA	PER	DON	EST	37th	1
2002	Cirtek Motorsport	Porsche 911 GT3-RS	N-GT								6			37th	1
