= Emanuele Moncini =

Italian racing driver (born 1973)

- Nationality: (Italy) Italian
- Born: 13 October 1973 (age 53) Breno, Italy
- Relatives: Leonardo Moncini (son)

FIA GT1 World Championship career
- Debut season: 2010
- Current team: Sunred
- Categorisation: FIA Silver
- Car number: 11

Previous series
- 2011 2008, 2010 2009 2007 2001 1999 1997–98: International GT Open; Italian GT Championship; Trofeo Abarth 500 Europe; Porsche Carrera Cup Italy; FIA GT Championship; Sports Racing World Cup; Italian Superturismo Championship

Emanuele Moncini (born 13 October 1973 in Breno, Italy) is an Italian racing driver currently competing in the FIA GT1 World Championship for Sunred.

Moncini raced in the Italian Superturismo Championship before embarking on an international career. In 1999, he raced in the Sports Racing World Cup where he won one round at Enna-Pergusa.

Moncini was vice-champion in the Italian GT Championship in 2008 and won the European Abarth 500 Trophy the following year.

Moncini returned to the Italian GT Championship in 2010 and won the championship in a Villorba Corse Ferrari 430 alongside ex-Formula 1 driver Andrea Montermini, with five wins. He graduated to the International GT Open in 2011.
