= 1993 Italian Superturismo Championship =

Seasons
- ← 1992 1994 →

The 1993 Italian Superturismo Championship was the seventh edition. The season began in Monza on 21 March and finished in Mugello on 3 October, after ten rounds. Roberto Ravaglia won the championship, driving a BMW 318i; the German manufacturer won the constructors' championship, while Amato Ferrari won the privateers' trophy.

== Teams and drivers ==
Team	Car	No.	Drivers	Rounds	Class
(Italy) Fiat Auto France	Alfa Romeo 155 TS	1	(Italy) Gabriele Tarquini	1, 3-10	
(Italy) Alfa Corse	Alfa Romeo 155 TS	2	(Italy) Gianni Morbidelli	3-8	
(Italy) Alfa Corse	Alfa Romeo 155 TS	3	(Italy) Tamara Vidali	1-6, 8-10	
(Italy) Alfa Corse	Alfa Romeo 155 TS	3	(Italy) Stefano Buttiero	7	
(Italy) Peugeot Talbot Sport	Peugeot 405	4	(Italy) Fabrizio Giovanardi	All	
(Italy) Peugeot Talbot Sport	Peugeot 405	5	(United Kingdom) Gary Ayles	All	
(Italy) Peugeot Talbot Sport	Peugeot 405	6	(Italy) Mauro Baldi	9	
(Italy) CiBiEmme Engineering	BMW 318i	7	(Italy) Roberto Ravaglia	All	
(Italy) CiBiEmme Engineering	BMW 318i	8	(Italy) Filippo Salvarani	1-8	
(Italy) CiBiEmme Engineering	BMW 318i	8	(Netherlands) Tom Coronel	9	
(Italy) CiBiEmme Engineering	BMW 318i	8	(Italy) Patrick Crinelli	10	
(Italy) Scuderia Bigazzi	BMW 318i	9	(Venezuela) Johnny Cecotto	1-8	
(Italy) Scuderia Bigazzi	BMW 318i	11	(Germany) Alexander Burgstaller	All	
(Italy) Euroteam	BMW 318i	12	(Italy) Stefano Modena	All	
(Italy) Euroteam	BMW 318i	14	(Italy) Federico d'Amore	1-5	
(Italy) Audi Sport Europa	Volkswagen Vento	15	(Italy) Giuseppe Gabbiani	1-2, 4-5, 7-10	
(Italy) Audi Sport Europa	Volkswagen Vento	16	(Italy) Rinaldo Capello	1-2, 4-10	
(Italy) Fiat Auto France	Alfa Romeo 155 TS	18	(Italy) Giorgio Francia	8-10	
(Italy) Alfa Corse	Alfa Romeo 155 TS	19	(Italy) Alessandro Nannini	9-10	
(Italy) Scuderia Bigazzi	BMW 318i	21	(Italy) Emanuele Pirro	9-10	
(France) Oreca	BMW 318i	22	(France) Laurent Aïello	2	
(Italy) Nissan Castrol Racing	Nissan Primera	23	(Italy) Ivan Capelli	7-8, 10	
(Italy) Euroteam	BMW 318i	24	(Italy) Andrea Montermini	6	
(France) Giroix Racing	SEAT Toledo	27	(France) Fabien Giroix	8	
(Italy) Euroteam	BMW 318i	28	(Italy) Marco Antonelli	10	
(Italy) Soli Racing Team	Alfa Romeo 155 TS	51	(Italy) Moreno Soli	6-9	P
(Italy) Peugeot Junior Team	Peugeot 405	52	(Italy) Amato Ferrari	All	P
(Italy) Trivellato Racing	Vauxhall Cavalier	53	(Italy) Graziano Rossi	1-4, 7-9	P
(Italy) Trivellato Racing	Vauxhall Cavalier	53	(Italy) Renato Prioli	9	P
(Italy) Tecno Racing	BMW M3	55	(Italy) Maurizio Lusuardi	1-3, 6-7, 9-10	P
(Italy) Tecno Racing	BMW M3	55	(Italy) Massimo Piacentini	9-10	P
(Germany) Dellenbach Motorsport	Opel Astra	56	(Switzerland) Franco Franzi	1	P
(Italy) AB Motorsport	BMW M3	58	(Italy) Marco Antonelli	6-8	P
(Italy) Greyhound Motorsport	BMW 318i	61	(Italy) Massimo Pigoli	1, 3-8, 10	P
(Italy) Greyhound Motorsport	BMW 318i	62	(Italy) Gianluca Roda	3-8, 10	P
(Italy) Conrero Squadra Corse	Opel Vectra Gsi	67	(Italy) Luca Maggiorelli	2-4, 6-8, 10	P
(Italy) Eurospeed Racing	BMW M3	68	(Italy) Rocco Peduzzi	1-2	P
(Italy) Eurospeed Racing	BMW M3	69	(Italy) Claudio Melotto	1-2	P
(Italy) Eurospeed Racing	BMW 318i	69	(Italy) Claudio Melotto	7-10	P

Icon	Class
P	Private Drivers

== Race calendar and results ==
Round		Circuit	Date	Pole position	Fastest lap	Winning driver	Winning team
1	R1	(Italy) Autodromo Nazionale Monza	21 March	(Italy) Roberto Ravaglia	(Italy) Roberto Ravaglia	(Italy) Roberto Ravaglia	(Italy) CiBiEmme Engineering
1	R2	(Italy) Autodromo Nazionale Monza	21 March		(Venezuela) Johnny Cecotto	(Venezuela) Johnny Cecotto	(Italy) Scuderia Bigazzi
2	R1	(Italy) ACI Vallelunga Circuit	18 April	(Italy) Fabrizio Giovanardi	(Italy) Roberto Ravaglia	(Italy) Roberto Ravaglia	(Italy) CiBiEmme Engineering
2	R2	(Italy) ACI Vallelunga Circuit	18 April		(Italy) Roberto Ravaglia	(Italy) Roberto Ravaglia	(Italy) CiBiEmme Engineering
3	R1	(Italy) Circuito Internazionale Santamonica	2 May	(Italy) Gabriele Tarquini	(Italy) Fabrizio Giovanardi	(Italy) Gabriele Tarquini	(Italy) Fiat Auto France
3	R2	(Italy) Circuito Internazionale Santamonica	2 May		(Italy) Gianni Morbidelli	(United Kingdom) Gary Ayles	(Italy) Peugeot Talbot Sport
4	R1	(Italy) Autodromo dell'Umbria	16 May	(Italy) Tamara Vidali	(Italy) Gianni Morbidelli	(Italy) Gianni Morbidelli	(Italy) Alfa Corse
4	R2	(Italy) Autodromo dell'Umbria	16 May		(Italy) Stefano Modena	(Italy) Gianni Morbidelli	(Italy) Alfa Corse
5	R1	(Italy) Autodromo del Levante	6 June	(Italy) Fabrizio Giovanardi	(Italy) Fabrizio Giovanardi	(Italy) Fabrizio Giovanardi	(Italy) Peugeot Talbot Sport
5	R2	(Italy) Autodromo del Levante	6 June		(Italy) Fabrizio Giovanardi	(Italy) Gabriele Tarquini	(Italy) Fiat Auto France
6	R1	(Italy) Autodromo Enzo e Dino Ferrari	20 June	(Italy) Fabrizio Giovanardi	(Italy) Fabrizio Giovanardi	(Italy) Fabrizio Giovanardi	(Italy) Peugeot Talbot Sport
6	R2	(Italy) Autodromo Enzo e Dino Ferrari	20 June		(Venezuela) Johnny Cecotto	(Venezuela) Johnny Cecotto	(Italy) Scuderia Bigazzi
7	R1	(Italy) Autodromo Riccardo Paletti	18 July	(Italy) Gianni Morbidelli	(Italy) Gianni Morbidelli	(Italy) Gabriele Tarquini	(Italy) Fiat Auto France
7	R2	(Italy) Autodromo Riccardo Paletti	18 July		(Venezuela) Johnny Cecotto	(Italy) Fabrizio Giovanardi	(Italy) Peugeot Talbot Sport
8	R1	(Italy) Circuito Internazionale Santamonica	1 August	(Italy) Fabrizio Giovanardi	(Italy) Gianni Morbidelli	(Italy) Gabriele Tarquini	(Italy) Fiat Auto France
8	R2	(Italy) Circuito Internazionale Santamonica	1 August		(Italy) Fabrizio Giovanardi	(Italy) Fabrizio Giovanardi	(Italy) Peugeot Talbot Sport
9	R1	(Italy) Autodromo di Pergusa	5 September	(Italy) Gabriele Tarquini	(Italy) Roberto Ravaglia	(Italy) Roberto Ravaglia	(Italy) CiBiEmme Engineering
9	R2	(Italy) Autodromo di Pergusa	5 September		(Italy) Roberto Ravaglia	(Italy) Roberto Ravaglia	(Italy) CiBiEmme Engineering
10	R1	(Italy) Autodromo Internazionale del Mugello	3 October	(Italy) Gabriele Tarquini	(Italy) Fabrizio Giovanardi	(Italy) Gabriele Tarquini	(Italy) Fiat Auto France
10	R2	(Italy) Autodromo Internazionale del Mugello	3 October		(Italy) Fabrizio Giovanardi	(Italy) Fabrizio Giovanardi	(Italy) Peugeot Talbot Sport

== Round 1 (Italy) Monza ==
Qualifying

Pos	No	Driver	Car	Lap Time
1	7	(Italy) Roberto Ravaglia	BMW 318i	1.57.422
2	9	(Venezuela) Johnny Cecotto	BMW 318i	1.57.644
3	4	(Italy) Fabrizio Giovanardi	Peugeot 405	1.58.784
4	5	(United Kingdom) Gary Ayles	Peugeot 405	1.59.182
5	8	(Italy) Filippo Salvarani	BMW 318i	2.00.215
6	1	(Italy) Gabriele Tarquini	Alfa Romeo 155	2.00.702
7	52	(Italy) Amato Ferrari	Peugeot 405	2.00.758
8	11	(Germany) Alexander Burgstaller	BMW 318iS	2.00.846
9	12	(Italy) Stefano Modena	BMW 318i	2.01.292
10	3	(Italy) Tamara Vidali	Alfa Romeo 155	2.01.342
11	68	(Italy) Rocco Peduzzi	BMW M3	2.03.846
12	61	(Italy) Massimo Pigoli	BMW 318i	2.03.964
13	55	(Italy) Maurizio Lusuardi	BMW M3	2.04.512
14	56	(Italy) Graziano Rossi	Vauxhall Cavalier	2.04.519
15	14	(Italy) Federico D'Amore	BMW 318i	2.04.671
16	69	(Italy) Claudio Melotto	BMW M3	2.05.322
17	16	(Italy) Rinaldo Capello	Volkswagen Vento	2.06.228
18	15	(Italy) Giuseppe Gabbiani	Volkswagen Vento	2.07.750

Race 1

Pos	No	Driver	Constructor	Time/Retired	Points
1	7	(Italy) Roberto Ravaglia	BMW 318iS	12 laps in 23:57.861	20
2	9	(Venezuela) Johnny Cecotto	BMW 318iS	+1.007s	15
3	1	(Italy) Gabriele Tarquini	Alfa Romeo 155	+14.122s	12
4	5	(United Kingdom) Gary Ayles	Peugeot 405	+20.200s	10
5	11	(Germany) Alexander Burgstaller	BMW 318i	+30.422s	8
6	3	(Italy) Tamara Vidali	Alfa Romeo 155	+33.416s	6
7	52	(Italy) Amato Ferrari	Peugeot 405	+36.147s	4
8	12	(Italy) Stefano Modena	Alfa Romeo 155	+43.359s	3
9	53	(Italy) Graziano Rossi	Vauxhall Cavalier	+1.12.387s	2
10	4	(Italy) Fabrizio Giovanardi	Peugeot 405	+1.15.193s	1
11	68	(Italy) Rocco Peduzzi	BMW M3	+1.15.324s	
12	55	(Italy) Maurizio Lusuardi	BMW M3	+1.17.061s	
13	14	(Italy) Federico D'Amore	BMW 318i	+1.17.796s	
14	61	(Italy) Massimo Pigoli	BMW 318i	+1 lap	
15	69	(Italy) Claudio Melotto	BMW M3	+1 lap	
DNF	16	(Italy) Rinaldo Capello	Volkswagen Vento		
DNF	8	(Italy) Filippo Salvarani	BMW 318i		
DNF	15	(Italy) Giuseppe Gabbiani	Volkswagen Vento		

- Fastest Lap: Roberto Ravaglia in 1.59.147 on lap 8

Race 2

Pos	No	Driver	Constructor	Time/Retired	Points
1	9	(Venezuela) Johnny Cecotto	BMW 318iS	18 laps in 35:55.811	20
2	7	(Italy) Roberto Ravaglia	BMW 318iS	+2.559s	15
3	5	(United Kingdom) Gary Ayles	Peugeot 405	+14.389s	12
4	4	(Italy) Fabrizio Giovanardi	Peugeot 405	+27.949s	10
5	3	(Italy) Tamara Vidali	Alfa Romeo 155	+1.04.935s	8
6	52	(Italy) Amato Ferrari	Peugeot 405	+1.11.577s	6
7	61	(Italy) Massimo Pigoli	BMW 318i	+1.51.643s	4
8	14	(Italy) Federico D'Amore	BMW 318i	+1 lap	3
9	12	(Italy) Stefano Modena	Alfa Romeo 155	+1 lap	2
10	69	(Italy) Claudio Melotto	BMW M3	+1 lap	1
11	11	(Germany) Alexander Burgstaller	BMW 318i	+1 lap	
12	1	(Italy) Gabriele Tarquini	Alfa Romeo 155	+3 laps	
13	55	(Italy) Maurizio Lusuardi	BMW M3	+9 laps	
DNF	53	(Italy) Graziano Rossi	Vauxhall Cavalier	+13 laps	
DNF	68	(Italy) Rocco Peduzzi	BMW M3		
DNF	16	(Italy) Rinaldo Capello	Volkswagen Vento		
DNF	8	(Italy) Filippo Salvarani	BMW 318i		
DNS	15	(Italy) Giuseppe Gabbiani	Volkswagen Vento		

- Fastest Lap: Johnny Cecotto in 1.58.543 on lap 6

=== Championship standings after Round 1 ===
Drivers' Championship standings

Pos	Driver	Points
1	(Italy) Roberto Ravaglia	35
2	(Venezuela) Johnny Cecotto	30
3	(United Kingdom) Gary Ayles	22
4	(Italy) Tamara Vidali	14
5	(Italy) Gabriele Tarquini	12

Constructors' Championship standings

Pos	Constructor	Points
1	(Germany) BMW	70
2	(France) Peugeot	36
3	(Italy) Alfa Romeo	26
4	(Germany) Opel	2

== Round 2 (Italy) Vallelunga ==
Qualifying

Pos	No	Driver	Car	Lap Time
1	4	(Italy) Fabrizio Giovanardi	Peugeot 405	1.19.237
2	7	(Italy) Roberto Ravaglia	BMW 318i	1.19.251
3	9	(Venezuela) Johnny Cecotto	BMW 318i	1.19.641
4	5	(United Kingdom) Gary Ayles	Peugeot 405	1.19.747
5	8	(Italy) Filippo Salvarani	BMW 318i	1.19.988
6	22	(France) Laurent Aiello	BMW 318i	1.20.032
7	12	(Italy) Stefano Modena	BMW 318i	1.20.189
8	11	(Germany) Alexander Burgstaller	BMW 318iS	1.20.357
9	52	(Italy) Amato Ferrari	Peugeot 405	1.20.406
10	14	(Italy) Federico D'Amore	BMW 318i	1.21.639
11	3	(Italy) Tamara Vidali	Alfa Romeo 155	1.21.725
12	67	(Italy) Luca Maggiorelli	Opel Vectra Gsi	1.21.873
13	53	(Italy) Graziano Rossi	Vauxhall Cavalier	1.21.873
14	16	(Italy) Rinaldo Capello	Volkswagen Vento	1.22.567
15	68	(Italy) Rocco Peduzzi	BWW M3	1.23.573
16	55	(Italy) Maurizio Lusuardi	BWW M3	1.23.700
17	15	(Italy) Giuseppe Gabbiani	Volkswagen Vento	1.24.301
18	69	(Italy) Claudio Melotto	Peugeot 405	1.24.576

Race 1

Pos	No	Driver	Constructor	Time/Retired	Points
1	7	(Italy) Roberto Ravaglia	BMW 318iS	18 laps in 24:16.509	20
2	9	(Venezuela) Johnny Cecotto	BMW 318i	+5.004s	15
3	5	(United Kingdom) Gary Ayles	Peugeot 405	+30.956s	12
4	53	(Italy) Graziano Rossi	Vauxhall Cavalier	+45.645s	10
5	3	(Italy) Tamara Vidali	Alfa Romeo 155	+47.155s	8
6	52	(Italy) Amato Ferrari	Peugeot 405	+52.064s	6
7	14	(Italy) Federico D'Amore	BMW 318i	+54.626s	4
8	55	(Italy) Maurizio Lusuardi	BMW M3	+1 lap	3
9	69	(Italy) Claudio Melotto	BMW M3	+1 lap	2
10	22	(France) Laurent Aiello	BMW 318i	+12 laps	1
11	4	(Italy) Fabrizio Giovanardi	Peugeot 405	+3 laps	
12	8	(Italy) Filippo Salvarani	BMW 318i	+4 laps	
13	11	(Germany) Alexander Burgstaller	BMW 318i	+4 laps	
14	68	(Italy) Rocco Peduzzi	BMW M3	+7 laps	
15	16	(Italy) Rinaldo Capello	Volkswagen Vento	+8 laps	
DNF	15	(Italy) Giuseppe Gabbiani	Volkswagen Vento		
DNF	67	(Italy) Luca Maggiorelli	Opel Vectra Gsi		
DNS	12	(Italy) Stefano Modena	BMW 318i		

- Fastest Lap: Roberto Ravaglia in 1.20.150 on lap 7

Race 2

Pos	No	Driver	Constructor	Time/Retired	Points
1	7	(Italy) Roberto Ravaglia	BMW 318iS	24 laps in 32:24.268	20
2	9	(Venezuela) Johnny Cecotto	BMW 318i	+1.943s	15
3	5	(United Kingdom) Gary Ayles	Peugeot 405	+24.701s	12
4	22	(France) Laurent Aiello	BMW 318i	+24.763s	10
5	11	(Germany) Alexander Burgstaller	BMW 318i	+28.965s	8
6	8	(Italy) Filippo Salvarani	BMW 318i	+29.407s	6
7	4	(Italy) Fabrizio Giovanardi	Peugeot 405	+51.011s	4
8	53	(Italy) Graziano Rossi	Vauxhall Cavalier	+1.07.582s	3
9	14	(Italy) Federico D'Amore	BMW 318i	+1 lap	2
10	55	(Italy) Maurizio Lusuardi	BMW M3	+1 lap	1
11	3	(Italy) Tamara Vidali	Alfa Romeo 155	+7 laps	
12	67	(Italy) Luca Maggiorelli	Opel Vectra Gsi	+9 laps	
13	69	(Italy) Claudio Melotto	BMW M3	+9 laps	
14	52	(Italy) Amato Ferrari	Peugeot 405	+12 laps	
DNF	68	(Italy) Rocco Peduzzi	BMW M3		
DNF	16	(Italy) Rinaldo Capello	Volkswagen Vento		
DNF	15	(Italy) Giuseppe Gabbiani	Volkswagen Vento		
DNS	12	(Italy) Stefano Modena	BMW 318i		

- Fastest Lap: Roberto Ravaglia in 1.20.118 on lap 2

=== Championship standings after Round 2 ===
Drivers' Championship standings

Pos	Driver	Points
1	(Italy) Roberto Ravaglia	75
2	(Venezuela) Johnny Cecotto	65
3	(United Kingdom) Gary Ayles	46
4	(Italy) Tamara Vidali	22
5	(Germany) Alexander Burgstaller	16

Constructors' Championship standings

Pos	Constructor	Points
1	(Germany) BMW	140
2	(France) Peugeot	70
3	(Italy) Alfa Romeo	34
4	(Germany) Opel	15

== Round 3 (Italy) Misano Adriatico ==
Qualifying

Pos	No	Driver	Car	Lap Time
1	1	(Italy) Gabriele Tarquini	Alfa Romeo 155	1.38.790
2	4	(Italy) Fabrizio Giovanardi	Peugeot 405	1.38.936
3	9	(Venezuela) Johnny Cecotto	BMW 318i	1.39.592
4	5	(United Kingdom) Gary Ayles	Peugeot 405	1.39.676
5	7	(Italy) Roberto Ravaglia	BMW 318i	1.39.685
6	2	(Italy) Gianni Morbidelli	Alfa Romeo 155	1.40.034
7	8	(Italy) Filippo Salvarani	BMW 318i	1.40.294
8	52	(Italy) Amato Ferrari	Peugeot 405	1.40.530
9	11	(Germany) Alexander Burgstaller	BMW 318iS	1.40.948
10	3	(Italy) Tamara Vidali	Alfa Romeo 155	1.41.133
11	12	(Italy) Stefano Modena	BMW 318i	1.41.141
12	53	(Italy) Graziano Rossi	Vauxhall Cavalier	1.42.675
13	14	(Italy) Federico D'Amore	BMW 318i	1.42.678
14	67	(Italy) Luca Maggiorelli	Opel Vectra Gsi	1.42.678
15	61	(Italy) Massimo Pigoli	BMW 318i	1.43.355
16	58	(Italy) Gianluca Roda	BMW 318i	1.43.553
17	55	(Italy) Maurizio Lusuardi	BMW M3	1.44.825

Race 1

Pos	No	Driver	Constructor	Time/Retired	Points
1	1	(Italy) Gabriele Tarquini	Alfa Romeo 155	16 laps in 27:12.751	20
2	4	(Italy) Fabrizio Giovanardi	Peugeot 405	+3.005s	15
3	52	(Italy) Amato Ferrari	Peugeot 405	+15.698s	12
4	11	(Germany) Alexander Burgstaller	BMW 318i	+19.222s	10
5	7	(Italy) Roberto Ravaglia	BMW 318i	+22.401s	8
6	3	(Italy) Tamara Vidali	Alfa Romeo 155	+28.108s	6
7	8	(Italy) Filippo Salvarani	BMW 318i	+30.020s	4
8	12	(Italy) Stefano Modena	BMW 318i	+31.666s	3
9	5	(United Kingdom) Gary Ayles	Peugeot 405	+43.399s	2
10	14	(Italy) Federico D'Amore	BMW 318i	+1.05.777s	1
11	53	(Italy) Graziano Rossi	Vauxhall Cavalier	+1.06.232s	
12	62	(Italy) Gianluca Roda	BMW 318i	+1.17.023s	
13	61	(Italy) Massimo Pigoli	Peugeot 405	+1.46.222s	
14	67	(Italy) Luca Maggiorelli	Opel Vectra Gsi	+1 lap	
DNF	2	(Italy) Gianni Morbidelli	Alfa Romeo 155	+15 laps	
DNF	9	(Venezuela) Johnny Cecotto	BMW 318i	+16 laps	
DNF	55	(Italy) Maurizio Lusuardi	BMW M3		

- Fastest Lap: Fabrizio Giovanardi in 1.40.51 on lap 14

Race 2

Pos	No	Driver	Constructor	Time/Retired	Points
1	5	(United Kingdom) Gary Ayles	Peugeot 405	21 laps in 36:03.281	20
2	11	(Germany) Alexander Burgstaller	BMW 318i	+1.057s	15
3	9	(Venezuela) Johnny Cecotto	BMW 318i	+2.736s	12
4	52	(Italy) Amato Ferrari	Peugeot 405	+13.315s	10
5	3	(Italy) Tamara Vidali	Alfa Romeo 155	+19.674s	8
6	12	(Italy) Stefano Modena	BMW 318i	+22.706s	6
7	7	(Italy) Roberto Ravaglia	BMW 318i	+40.890s	4
8	14	(Italy) Federico D'Amore	BMW 318i	+58.017s	3
9	2	(Italy) Gianni Morbidelli	Alfa Romeo 155	+1.13.498s	2
10	53	(Italy) Graziano Rossi	Vauxhall Cavalier	+1.25.956s	1
11	67	(Italy) Luca Maggiorelli	Opel Vectra Gsi	+4 laps	
12	61	(Italy) Massimo Pigoli	Peugeot 405	+6 laps	
DNF	1	(Italy) Gabriele Tarquini	Alfa Romeo 155		
DNF	8	(Italy) Filippo Salvarani	BMW 318i		
DNF	62	(Italy) Gianluca Roda	BMW 318i		
DNF	55	(Italy) Maurizio Lusuardi	BMW M3		
DSQ	4	(Italy) Fabrizio Giovanardi	Peugeot 405		

- Fastest Lap: Gianni Morbidelli in 1.40.280 on lap 19

=== Championship standings after Round 3 ===
Drivers' Championship standings

Pos	Driver	Points
1	(Italy) Roberto Ravaglia	87
2	(Venezuela) Johnny Cecotto	77
3	(United Kingdom) Gary Ayles	68
4	(Germany) Alexander Burgstaller	41
5	(Italy) Amato Ferrari	38

Constructors' Championship standings

Pos	Constructor	Points
1	(Germany) BMW	185
2	(France) Peugeot	127
3	(Italy) Alfa Romeo	70
4	(Germany) Opel	15

== Round 4 (Italy) Magione ==
Qualifying

Pos	No	Driver	Car	Lap Time
1	3	(Italy) Tamara Vidali	Alfa Romeo 155	53.547
2	4	(Italy) Fabrizio Giovanardi	Peugeot 405	53.657
3	7	(Italy) Roberto Ravaglia	BMW 318i	53.695
4	12	(Italy) Stefano Modena	BMW 318i	53.867
5	2	(Italy) Gianni Morbidelli	Alfa Romeo 155	53.896
6	1	(Italy) Gabriele Tarquini	Alfa Romeo 155	53.896
7	9	(Venezuela) Johnny Cecotto	BMW 318iS	54.013
8	5	(United Kingdom) Gary Ayles	Peugeot 405	54.102
9	52	(Italy) Amato Ferrari	Peugeot 405	54.238
10	8	(Italy) Filippo Salvarani	BMW 318i	54.367
11	11	(Germany) Alexander Burgstaller	BMW 318i	54.469
12	14	(Italy) Federico D'Amore	BMW 318i	54.927
13	53	(Italy) Graziano Rossi	Vauxhall Cavalier	55.360
14	67	(Italy) Luca Maggiorelli	Opel Vectra Gsi	55.389
15	61	(Italy) Massimo Pigoli	BMW 318i	55.460
16	16	(Italy) Rinaldo Capello	Volkswagen Vento	55.667
17	62	(Italy) Gianluca Roda	BMW 318i	55.819
18	15	(Italy) Giuseppe Gabbiani	Volkswagen Vento	56.169

Race 1

Pos	No	Driver	Constructor	Time/Retired	Points
1	2	(Italy) Gianni Morbidelli	Alfa Romeo 155	26 laps in 23:59.553	20
2	1	(Italy) Gabriele Tarquini	Alfa Romeo 155	+3.347s	15
3	3	(Italy) Tamara Vidali	Alfa Romeo 155	+4.552s	12
4	7	(Italy) Roberto Ravaglia	BMW 318i	+4.802s	10
5	9	(Venezuela) Johnny Cecotto	BMW 318i	+5.650s	8
6	4	(Italy) Fabrizio Giovanardi	Peugeot 405	+12.465s	6
7	52	(Italy) Amato Ferrari	Peugeot 405	+14.567s	4
8	5	(United Kingdom) Gary Ayles	Peugeot 405	+18.006s	3
9	11	(Germany) Alexander Burgstaller	BMW 318i	+27.750s	2
10	61	(Italy) Massimo Pigoli	Peugeot 405	+44.756s	1
11	53	(Italy) Graziano Rossi	Vauxhall Cavalier	+1 lap	
12	62	(Italy) Gianluca Roda	BMW 318i	+1 lap	
13	8	(Italy) Filippo Salvarani	BMW 318i	+1 lap	
14	16	(Italy) Rinaldo Capello	Volkswagen Vento	+2 laps	
15	12	(Italy) Stefano Modena	BMW 318i	+2 laps	
DNF	15	(Italy) Giuseppe Gabbiani	Volkswagen Vento		
DNF	14	(Italy) Federico D'Amore	BMW 318i		
DNF	67	(Italy) Luca Maggiorelli	Opel Vectra Gsi		

- Fastest Lap: Gianni Morbidelli in 53.929 on lap 11

Race 2

Pos	No	Driver	Constructor	Time/Retired	Points
1	2	(Italy) Gianni Morbidelli	Alfa Romeo 155	26 laps in 23:39.036	20
2	1	(Italy) Gabriele Tarquini	Alfa Romeo 155	+10.385s	15
3	7	(Italy) Roberto Ravaglia	BMW 318i	+10.695s	12
4	3	(Italy) Tamara Vidali	Alfa Romeo 155	+15.500s	10
5	11	(Germany) Alexander Burgstaller	BMW 318i	+18.075s	8
6	5	(United Kingdom) Gary Ayles	Peugeot 405	+21.096s	6
7	52	(Italy) Amato Ferrari	Peugeot 405	+22.707s	4
8	8	(Italy) Filippo Salvarani	BMW 318i	+23.704s	3
9	61	(Italy) Massimo Pigoli	Peugeot 405	+36.043s	2
10	14	(Italy) Federico D'Amore	BMW 318i	+37.869s	1
11	12	(Italy) Stefano Modena	BMW 318i	+1 lap	
12	67	(Italy) Luca Maggiorelli	Opel Vectra Gsi	+1 lap	
13	4	(Italy) Fabrizio Giovanardi	Peugeot 405	+5 laps	
14	9	(Venezuela) Johnny Cecotto	BMW 318i	+12 laps	
15	62	(Italy) Gianluca Roda	BMW 318i	+13 laps	
DNF	53	(Italy) Graziano Rossi	Vauxhall Cavalier		
DNF	16	(Italy) Rinaldo Capello	Volkswagen Vento		
DNF	15	(Italy) Giuseppe Gabbiani	Volkswagen Vento		

- Fastest Lap: Stefano Modena in 54.053 on lap 7

=== Championship standings after Round 4 ===
Drivers' Championship standings

Pos	Driver	Points
1	(Italy) Roberto Ravaglia	109
2	(Venezuela) Johnny Cecotto	85
3	(United Kingdom) Gary Ayles	77
4	(Italy) Gabriele Tarquini	62
5	(Italy) Tamara Vidali	58

Constructors' Championship standings

Pos	Constructor	Points
1	(Germany) BMW	223
2	(France) Peugeot	147
3	(Italy) Alfa Romeo	140
4	(Germany) Opel	16

== Round 5 (Italy) Binetto ==
Qualifying

Pos	No	Driver	Car	Lap Time
1	4	(Italy) Fabrizio Giovanardi	Peugeot 405	49.433
2	1	(Italy) Gabriele Tarquini	Alfa Romeo 155	49.513
3	2	(Italy) Gianni Morbidelli	Alfa Romeo 155	49.681
4	3	(Italy) Tamara Vidali	Alfa Romeo 155	49.695
5	5	(United Kingdom) Gary Ayles	Peugeot 405	49.871
6	9	(Venezuela) Johnny Cecotto	BMW 318i	49.899
7	7	(Italy) Roberto Ravaglia	BMW 318i	49.923
8	12	(Italy) Stefano Modena	BMW 318i	49.961
9	52	(Italy) Amato Ferrari	Peugeot 405	49.987
10	8	(Italy) Filippo Salvarani	BMW 318i	50.029
11	11	(Germany) Alexander Burgstaller	BMW 318i	50.301
12	62	(Italy) Gianluca Roda	BMW 318i	50.969
13	61	(Italy) Massimo Pigoli	BMW 318i	51.163
14	14	(Italy) Federico D'Amore	BMW 318i	51.293
15	15	(Italy) Giuseppe Gabbiani	Volkswagen Vento	51.880
16	16	(Italy) Rinaldo Capello	Volkswagen Vento	51.932

Race 1

Pos	No	Driver	Constructor	Time/Retired	Points
1	4	(Italy) Fabrizio Giovanardi	Peugeot 405	28 laps in 23:49.021	20
2	1	(Italy) Gabriele Tarquini	Alfa Romeo 155	+2.186s	15
3	3	(Italy) Tamara Vidali	Alfa Romeo 155	+5.041s	12
4	5	(United Kingdom) Gary Ayles	Peugeot 405	+14.008s	10
5	7	(Italy) Roberto Ravaglia	BMW 318i	+17.225s	8
6	12	(Italy) Stefano Modena	BMW 318i	+21.637s	6
7	8	(Italy) Filippo Salvarani	BMW 318i	+23.100s	4
8	52	(Italy) Amato Ferrari	Peugeot 405	+24.665s	3
9	11	(Germany) Alexander Burgstaller	BMW 318i	+25.602s	2
10	62	(Italy) Gianluca Roda	BMW 318i	+50.897s	1
11	16	(Italy) Rinaldo Capello	Volkswagen Vento	+1 lap	
12	14	(Italy) Federico D'Amore	BMW 318i	+1 lap	
13	9	(Venezuela) Johnny Cecotto	BMW 318i	+1 lap	
14	2	(Italy) Gianni Morbidelli	Alfa Romeo 155	+5 laps	
15	61	(Italy) Massimo Pigoli	BMW 318i	+1 lap	
16	15	(Italy) Giuseppe Gabbiani	Volkswagen Vento	+8 laps	

- Fastest Lap: Fabrizio Giovanardi in 50.167 on lap 5

Race 2

Pos	No	Driver	Constructor	Time/Retired	Points
1	1	(Italy) Gabriele Tarquini	Alfa Romeo 155	28 laps in 23:45.563	20
2	4	(Italy) Fabrizio Giovanardi	Peugeot 405	+3.629s	15
3	7	(Italy) Roberto Ravaglia	BMW 318i	+5.789s	12
4	5	(United Kingdom) Gary Ayles	Peugeot 405	+13.873s	10
5	9	(Venezuela) Johnny Cecotto	BMW 318i	+14.864s	8
6	11	(Germany) Alexander Burgstaller	BMW 318i	+15.864s	6
7	12	(Italy) Stefano Modena	BMW 318i	+18.095s	4
8	8	(Italy) Filippo Salvarani	BMW 318i	+25.405s	3
9	62	(Italy) Gianluca Roda	BMW 318i	+33.495s	2
10	61	(Italy) Massimo Pigoli	BMW 318i	+38.195s	1
11	3	(Italy) Tamara Vidali	Alfa Romeo 155	+38.654s	
12	14	(Italy) Federico D'Amore	BMW 318i	+42.435s	
DNF	52	(Italy) Amato Ferrari	Peugeot 405		
DNF	16	(Italy) Rinaldo Capello	Volkswagen Vento		
DNF	2	(Italy) Gianni Morbidelli	Alfa Romeo 155		
DNF	15	(Italy) Giuseppe Gabbiani	Volkswagen Vento		

- Fastest Lap: Fabrizio Giovanardi in 50.316 on lap 3

=== Championship standings after Round 5 ===
Drivers' Championship standings

Pos	Driver	Points
1	(Italy) Roberto Ravaglia	129
2	(Italy) Gabriele Tarquini	97
3	(United Kingdom) Gary Ayles	97
4	(Venezuela) Johnny Cecotto	93
5	(Italy) Fabrizio Giovanardi	71

Constructors' Championship standings

Pos	Constructor	Points
1	(Germany) BMW	257
2	(France) Peugeot	202
3	(Italy) Alfa Romeo	187
4	(Germany) Opel	16

== Round 6 (Italy) Imola ==
Qualifying

Pos	No	Driver	Car	Lap Time
1	4	(Italy) Fabrizio Giovanardi	Peugeot 405	1.56.068
2	1	(Italy) Gabriele Tarquini	Alfa Romeo 155	1.56.774
3	5	(United Kingdom) Gary Ayles	Peugeot 405	1.57.093
4	9	(Venezuela) Johnny Cecotto	BMW 318i	1.57.152
5	2	(Italy) Gianni Morbidelli	Alfa Romeo 155	1.57.465
6	7	(Italy) Roberto Ravaglia	BMW 318i	1.57.543
7	11	(Germany) Alexander Burgstaller	BMW 318i	1.57.670
8	52	(Italy) Amato Ferrari	Peugeot 405	1.57.847
9	3	(Italy) Tamara Vidali	Alfa Romeo 155	1.57.933
10	12	(Italy) Stefano Modena	BMW 318i	1.58.022
11	8	(Italy) Filippo Salvarani	BMW 318i	1.58.873
12	24	(Italy) Andrea Montermini	BMW 318i	1.58.988
13	51	(Italy) Moreno Soli	Alfa Romeo 155	1.59.782
14	67	(Italy) Luca Maggiorelli	Opel Vectra Gsi	2.00.043
15	62	(Italy) Gianluca Roda	BMW 318i	2.01.420
16	61	(Italy) Massimo Pigoli	BMW 318i	2.01.796
17	58	(Italy) Marco Antonelli	BMW M3	2.02.206
18	55	(Italy) Maurizio Lusuardi	BMW M3	2.02.258
19	15	(Italy) Giuseppe Gabbiani	Volkswagen Vento	no time
20	16	(Italy) Rinaldo Capello	Volkswagen Vento	no time

Race 1

Pos	No	Driver	Constructor	Time/Retired	Points
1	4	(Italy) Fabrizio Giovanardi	Peugeot 405	12 laps in 23:45.209	20
2	1	(Italy) Gabriele Tarquini	Alfa Romeo 155	+1.387s	15
3	9	(Venezuela) Johnny Cecotto	BMW 318i	+7.861s	12
4	5	(United Kingdom) Gary Ayles	Peugeot 405	+12.679s	10
5	7	(Italy) Roberto Ravaglia	BMW 318i	+19.388s	8
6	11	(Germany) Alexander Burgstaller	BMW 318i	+21.806s	6
7	8	(Italy) Filippo Salvarani	BMW 318i	+32.692s	4
9	67	(Italy) Luca Maggiorelli	Opel Vectra Gsi	+52.329s	2
10	58	(Italy) Marco Antonelli	BMW M3	+1.01.379s	1
11	55	(Italy) Maurizio Lusuardi	BMW M3	+1.20.474s	
12	62	(Italy) Gianluca Roda	BMW 318i	+1.30.998s	
13	61	(Italy) Massimo Pigoli	BMW 318i	+1.41.675s	
14	51	(Italy) Moreno Soli	Alfa Romeo 155	+1 lap	
15	24	(Italy) Andrea Montermini	BMW 318i	+1 lap	
16	3	(Italy) Tamara Vidali	Alfa Romeo 155	+2 laps	
17	16	(Italy) Rinaldo Capello	Volkswagen Vento	+4 laps	
18	52	(Italy) Amato Ferrari	Peugeot 405	+4 laps	
DNF	12	(Italy) Stefano Modena	BMW 318i		
DNF	2	(Italy) Gianni Morbidelli	Alfa Romeo 155		
DNF	15	(Italy) Giuseppe Gabbiani	Volkswagen Vento		

- Fastest Lap: Fabrizio Giovanardi in 1.58.079 on lap 6

Race 2

Pos	No	Driver	Constructor	Time/Retired	Points
1	9	(Venezuela) Johnny Cecotto	BMW 318i	14 laps in 27:59.544	20
2	7	(Italy) Roberto Ravaglia	BMW 318i	+9.886s	15
3	4	(Italy) Fabrizio Giovanardi	Peugeot 405	+13.892s	12
4	8	(Italy) Filippo Salvarani	BMW 318i	+22.093s	10
5	5	(United Kingdom) Gary Ayles	Peugeot 405	+32.009s	8
6	52	(Italy) Amato Ferrari	Peugeot 405	+35.887s	6
7	2	(Italy) Gianni Morbidelli	Alfa Romeo 155	+40.723s	4
8	24	(Italy) Andrea Montermini	BMW 318i	+56.410s	3
9	58	(Italy) Marco Antonelli	BMW M3	+58.639s	2
10	67	(Italy) Luca Maggiorelli	Opel Vectra Gsi	+1.12.096s	1
11	51	(Italy) Moreno Soli	Alfa Romeo 155	+1.25.656s	
12	12	(Italy) Stefano Modena	BMW 318i	+1.25.933s	
13	11	(Germany) Alexander Burgstaller	BMW 318i	+1.41.560s	
14	55	(Italy) Maurizio Lusuardi	BMW M3	+1 lap	
15	1	(Italy) Gabriele Tarquini	Alfa Romeo 155	+5 laps	
DNF	62	(Italy) Gianluca Roda	BMW 318i		
DNF	61	(Italy) Massimo Pigoli	BMW 318i		
DNF	3	(Italy) Tamara Vidali	Alfa Romeo 155		
DNF	16	(Italy) Rinaldo Capello	Volkswagen Vento		
DNF	15	(Italy) Giuseppe Gabbiani	Volkswagen Vento		

- Fastest Lap: Fabrizio Giovanardi in 50.316 on lap 3

=== Championship standings after Round 6 ===
Drivers' Championship standings

Pos	Driver	Points
1	(Italy) Roberto Ravaglia	152
2	(Venezuela) Johnny Cecotto	125
3	(United Kingdom) Gary Ayles	115
4	(Italy) Gabriele Tarquini	112
5	(Italy) Fabrizio Giovanardi	103

Constructors' Championship standings

Pos	Constructor	Points
1	(Germany) BMW	312
2	(France) Peugeot	252
3	(Italy) Alfa Romeo	206
4	(Germany) Opel	19

== Round 7 (Italy) Varano De Melegari ==
Qualifying

Pos	No	Driver	Car	Lap Time
1	2	(Italy) Gianni Morbidelli	Alfa Romeo 155	49.946
2	1	(Italy) Gabriele Tarquini	Alfa Romeo 155	50.006
3	7	(Italy) Roberto Ravaglia	BMW 318i	50.187
4	4	(Italy) Fabrizio Giovanardi	Peugeot 405	50.275
5	9	(Venezuela) Johnny Cecotto	BMW 318i	50.404
6	3	(Italy) Stefano Buttiero	Alfa Romeo 155	50.513
7	52	(Italy) Amato Ferrari	Peugeot 405	50.556
8	5	(United Kingdom) Gary Ayles	Peugeot 405	50.631
9	8	(Italy) Filippo Salvarani	BMW 318i	50.713
10	12	(Italy) Stefano Modena	BMW 318i	50.718
11	11	(Germany) Alexander Burgstaller	BMW 318i	50.980
12	51	(Italy) Moreno Soli	Alfa Romeo 155	51.244
13	23	(Italy) Ivan Capelli	Nissan Primera	51.418
14	61	(Italy) Massimo Pigoli	BMW 318i	51.817
15	67	(Italy) Luca Maggiorelli	Opel Vectra Gsi	51.850
16	16	(Italy) Rinaldo Capello	Volkswagen Vento	51.943
17	62	(Italy) Gianluca Roda	BMW 318i	51.977
18	55	(Italy) Maurizio Lusuardi	BMW M3	52.102
19	56	(Italy) Graziano Rossi	Vauxhall Cavalier	52.633
20	15	(Italy) Giuseppe Gabbiani	Volkswagen Vento	53.561
21	69	(Italy) Claudio Melotto	BMW 318i	53.933
22	58	(Italy) Marco Antonelli	BMW 318i	no time

Race 1

Pos	No	Driver	Constructor	Time/Retired	Points
1	1	(Italy) Gabriele Tarquini	Alfa Romeo 155	26 laps in 22:16.814	20
2	7	(Italy) Roberto Ravaglia	BMW 318i	+4.526s	15
3	4	(Italy) Fabrizio Giovanardi	Peugeot 405	+5.567s	12
4	9	(Venezuela) Johnny Cecotto	BMW 318i	+7.910s	10
5	5	(United Kingdom) Gary Ayles	Peugeot 405	+19.658s	8
6	8	(Italy) Filippo Salvarani	BMW 318i	+20.922s	6
7	3	(Italy) Stefano Buttiero	Alfa Romeo 155	+25.865s	4
8	12	(Italy) Stefano Modena	BMW 318i	+26.370s	3
9	11	(Germany) Alexander Burgstaller	BMW 318i	+28.838s	2
10	67	(Italy) Luca Maggiorelli	Opel Vectra Gsi	+41.675s	1
11	58	(Italy) Marco Antonelli	BMW M3	+44.379s	
12	23	(Italy) Ivan Capelli	Nissan Primera	+1.36.027s	
13	56	(Italy) Graziano Rossi	Vauxhall Cavalier	+1 lap	
14	69	(Italy) Claudio Melotto	BMW 318i	+1 lap	
15	55	(Italy) Maurizio Lusuardi	BMW M3	+3 laps	
16	2	(Italy) Gianni Morbidelli	Alfa Romeo 155	+10 laps	
17	51	(Italy) Moreno Soli	Alfa Romeo 155	+10 laps	
DNF	52	(Italy) Amato Ferrari	Peugeot 405		
DNF	15	(Italy) Giuseppe Gabbiani	Volkswagen Vento		
DNF	62	(Italy) Gianluca Roda	BMW 318i		
DNF	16	(Italy) Rinaldo Capello	Volkswagen Vento		
DNF	61	(Italy) Massimo Pigoli	BMW 318i		

- Fastest Lap: Gianni Morbidelli in 50.612 on lap 2

Race 2

Pos	No	Driver	Constructor	Time/Retired	Points
1	4	(Italy) Fabrizio Giovanardi	Peugeot 405	26 laps in 22:29.372s	20
2	1	(Italy) Gabriele Tarquini	Alfa Romeo 155	+2.667s	15
3	2	(Italy) Gianni Morbidelli	Alfa Romeo 155	+7.020s	12
4	8	(Italy) Filippo Salvarani	BMW 318i	+10.820s	10
5	5	(United Kingdom) Gary Ayles	Peugeot 405	+15.310s	8
6	12	(Italy) Stefano Modena	BMW 318i	+18.839s	6
7	3	(Italy) Stefano Buttiero	Alfa Romeo 155	+20.463s	4
8	11	(Germany) Alexander Burgstaller	BMW 318i	+20.859s	3
9	9	(Venezuela) Johnny Cecotto	BMW 318i	+24.366s	2
10	7	(Italy) Roberto Ravaglia	BMW 318i	+30.736s	1
11	58	(Italy) Marco Antonelli	BMW M3	+37.750s	
12	51	(Italy) Moreno Soli	Alfa Romeo 155	+39.966s	
13	23	(Italy) Ivan Capelli	Nissan Primera	+45.868s	
14	16	(Italy) Rinaldo Capello	Volkswagen Vento	+1 lap	
15	56	(Italy) Graziano Rossi	Vauxhall Cavalier	+1 lap	
16	55	(Italy) Maurizio Lusuardi	BMW M3	+1 lap	
17	67	(Italy) Luca Maggiorelli	Opel Vectra Gsi	+3 laps	
18	62	(Italy) Gianluca Roda	BMW 318i	+11 laps	
19	61	(Italy) Massimo Pigoli	BMW 318i	+13 laps	
DNF	69	(Italy) Claudio Melotto	BMW 318i		
DNF	52	(Italy) Amato Ferrari	Peugeot 405		
DNF	15	(Italy) Giuseppe Gabbiani	Volkswagen Vento		

- Fastest Lap: Johnny Cecotto in 51.052 on lap 7

=== Championship standings after Round 7 ===
Drivers' Championship standings

Pos	Driver	Points
1	(Italy) Roberto Ravaglia	168
2	(Italy) Gabriele Tarquini	147
3	(Venezuela) Johnny Cecotto	137
4	(Italy) Fabrizio Giovanardi	135
5	(United Kingdom) Gary Ayles	131

Constructors' Championship standings

Pos	Constructor	Points
1	(Germany) BMW	353
2	(France) Peugeot	300
3	(Italy) Alfa Romeo	257
4	(Germany) Opel	20

== Round 8 (Italy) Misano Adriatico ==
Qualifying

Pos	No	Driver	Car	Lap Time
1	4	(Italy) Fabrizio Giovanardi	Peugeot 405	1.38.594
2	1	(Italy) Gabriele Tarquini	Alfa Romeo 155	1.39.072
3	2	(Italy) Gianni Morbidelli	Alfa Romeo 155	1.39.098
4	7	(Italy) Roberto Ravaglia	BMW 318i	1.39.424
5	5	(United Kingdom) Gary Ayles	Peugeot 405	1.39.523
6	9	(Venezuela) Johnny Cecotto	BMW 318i	1.39.853
7	52	(Italy) Amato Ferrari	Peugeot 405	1.39.915
8	18	(Italy) Giorgio Francia	Alfa Romeo 155	1.39.998
9	3	(Italy) Tamara Vidali	Alfa Romeo 155	1.40.109
10	12	(Italy) Stefano Modena	BMW 318i	1.40.184
11	8	(Italy) Filippo Salvarani	BMW 318i	1.41.111
12	11	(Germany) Alexander Burgstaller	BMW 318iS	1.41.676
13	51	(Italy) Moreno Soli	Alfa Romeo 155	1.41.864
14	61	(Italy) Massimo Pigoli	BMW 318i	1.42.301
15	67	(Italy) Luca Maggiorelli	Opel Vectra Gsi	1.42.672
16	16	(Italy) Rinaldo Capello	Volkswagen Vento	1.42.881
17	53	(Italy) Graziano Rossi	Vauxhall Cavalier	1.43.301
18	58	(Italy) Marco Antonelli	BMW M3	1.44.247
19	62	(Italy) Gianluca Roda	BMW 318i	1.44.281
20	58	(Italy) Claudio Melotto	BMW 318i	1.45.332
21	23	(Italy) Ivan Capelli	Nissan Primera	no time
22	15	(Italy) Giuseppe Gabbiani	Volkswagen Vento	no time

Race 1

Pos	No	Driver	Constructor	Time/Retired	Points
1	1	(Italy) Gabriele Tarquini	Alfa Romeo 155	16 laps in 27:01.481	20
2	5	(United Kingdom) Gary Ayles	Peugeot 405	+3.986s	15
3	9	(Venezuela) Johnny Cecotto	BMW 318i	+6.756s	12
4	18	(Italy) Giorgio Francia	Alfa Romeo 155	+8.005s	10
5	3	(Italy) Tamara Vidali	Alfa Romeo 155	+15.845s	8
6	4	(Italy) Fabrizio Giovanardi	Peugeot 405	+21.214s	6
7	7	(Italy) Roberto Ravaglia	BMW 318i	+34.291s	4
8	11	(Germany) Alexander Burgstaller	BMW 318i	+35.131s	3
9	12	(Italy) Stefano Modena	BMW 318i	+36.635s	2
10	8	(Italy) Filippo Salvarani	BMW 318i	+46.469s	1
11	52	(Italy) Amato Ferrari	Peugeot 405	+52.885s	
12	53	(Italy) Graziano Rossi	Vauxhall Cavalier	+1.07.541s	
13	61	(Italy) Massimo Pigoli	Peugeot 405	+1.13.327s	
14	16	(Italy) Rinaldo Capello	Volkswagen Vento	+1.21.651s	
15	62	(Italy) Gianluca Roda	BMW 318i	+1.23.481s	
16	2	(Italy) Gianni Morbidelli	Alfa Romeo 155	+1 lap	
17	58	(Italy) Claudio Melotto	BMW 318i	+2 laps	
18	67	(Italy) Luca Maggiorelli	Opel Vectra Gsi	+3 laps	
19	15	(Italy) Giuseppe Gabbiani	Volkswagen Vento	+7 laps	
20	58	(Italy) Marco Antonelli	BMW M3	+8 laps	
DNF	23	(Italy) Ivan Capelli	Nissan Primera		
DNF	51	(Italy) Moreno Soli	Alfa Romeo 155		

- Fastest Lap: Gianni Morbidelli in 1.40.415 on lap 3

Race 2

Pos	No	Driver	Constructor	Time/Retired	Points
1	4	(Italy) Fabrizio Giovanardi	Peugeot 405	21 laps in 35:19.246	20
2	18	(Italy) Giorgio Francia	Alfa Romeo 155	+3.700s	15
3	7	(Italy) Roberto Ravaglia	BMW 318i	+14.084s	12
4	9	(Venezuela) Johnny Cecotto	BMW 318i	+14.500s	10
5	3	(Italy) Tamara Vidali	Alfa Romeo 155	+15.869s	8
6	52	(Italy) Amato Ferrari	Peugeot 405	+18.411s	6
7	11	(Germany) Alexander Burgstaller	BMW 318i	+21.716s	4
8	8	(Italy) Filippo Salvarani	BMW 318i	+38.246s	3
9	67	(Italy) Luca Maggiorelli	Opel Vectra Gsi	+53.581s	2
10	51	(Italy) Moreno Soli	Alfa Romeo 155	+54.500s	1
11	58	(Italy) Marco Antonelli	BMW M3	+1.23.937s	
12	61	(Italy) Massimo Pigoli	Peugeot 405	+1.26.493s	
13	16	(Italy) Rinaldo Capello	Volkswagen Vento	+1.29.666s	
14	58	(Italy) Claudio Melotto	BMW 318i	+1 lap	
15	53	(Italy) Graziano Rossi	Vauxhall Cavalier	+2 laps	
16	23	(Italy) Ivan Capelli	Nissan Primera	+4 laps	
DNF	12	(Italy) Stefano Modena	BMW 318i		
DNF	62	(Italy) Gianluca Roda	BMW 318i		
DNF	1	(Italy) Gabriele Tarquini	Alfa Romeo 155		
DNF	15	(Italy) Giuseppe Gabbiani	Volkswagen Vento		
DSQ	2	(Italy) Gianni Morbidelli	Alfa Romeo 155		
DSQ	5	(United Kingdom) Gary Ayles	Peugeot 405		

- Fastest Lap: Gianni Morbidelli in 1.40.280 on lap 19

=== Championship standings after Round 8 ===
Drivers' Championship standings

Pos	Driver	Points
1	(Italy) Roberto Ravaglia	184
2	(Italy) Gabriele Tarquini	167
3	(Italy) Fabrizio Giovanardi	161
4	(Venezuela) Johnny Cecotto	159
5	(United Kingdom) Gary Ayles	146

Constructors' Championship standings

Pos	Constructor	Points
1	(Germany) BMW	391
2	(France) Peugeot	347
3	(Italy) Alfa Romeo	310
4	(Germany) Opel	22

== Round 9 (Italy) Pergusa ==
Qualifying

Pos	No	Driver	Car	Lap Time
1	1	(Italy) Gabriele Tarquini	Alfa Romeo 155	1.43.456
2	4	(Italy) Fabrizio Giovanardi	Peugeot 405	1.43.458
3	7	(Italy) Roberto Ravaglia	BMW 318i	1.44.074
4	5	(United Kingdom) Gary Ayles	Peugeot 405	1.44.458
5	21	(Italy) Emanuele Pirro	BMW 318i	1.44.320
6	19	(Italy) Alessandro Nannini	Alfa Romeo 155	1.44.488
7	11	(Germany) Alexander Burgstaller	BMW 318iS	1.44.691
8	6	(Italy) Mauro Baldi	Peugeot 405	1.44.766
9	18	(Italy) Giorgio Francia	Alfa Romeo 155	1.44.795
10	3	(Italy) Tamara Vidali	Alfa Romeo 155	1.44.886
11	12	(Italy) Stefano Modena	BMW 318i	1.45.075
12	8	(Netherlands) Tom Coronel	BMW 318i	1.45.200
13	52	(Italy) Amato Ferrari	Peugeot 405	1.45.785
14	53	(Italy) Graziano Rossi	Vauxhall Cavalier	1.48.045
15	16	(Italy) Rinaldo Capello	Volkswagen Vento	1.48.306
16	55	(Italy) Maurizio Lusuardi	BMW M3	1.48.912
17	51	(Italy) Moreno Soli	Alfa Romeo 155	1.49.037
18	15	(Italy) Giuseppe Gabbiani	Volkswagen Vento	1.49.350
19	58	(Italy) Claudio Melotto	BMW 318i	1.51.795

Race 1

Pos	No	Driver	Constructor	Time/Retired	Points
1	7	(Italy) Roberto Ravaglia	BMW 318i	30 laps in 53:01.121	20
2	4	(Italy) Fabrizio Giovanardi	Peugeot 405	+4.949s	15
3	1	(Italy) Gabriele Tarquini	Alfa Romeo 155	+9.599s	12
4	5	(United Kingdom) Gary Ayles	Peugeot 405	+12.685s	10
5	21	(Italy) Emanuele Pirro	BMW 318i	+27.372s	8
6	6	(Italy) Mauro Baldi	Peugeot 405	+27.543s	6
7	11	(Germany) Alexander Burgstaller	BMW 318i	+31.369s	4
8	19	(Italy) Alessandro Nannini	Alfa Romeo 155	+46.760s	3
9	3	(Italy) Tamara Vidali	Alfa Romeo 155	+49.340s	2
10	12	(Italy) Stefano Modena	BMW 318i	+1.45.075s	1
11	51	(Italy) Moreno Soli	Alfa Romeo 155	+1 lap	
12	16	(Italy) Rinaldo Capello	Volkswagen Vento	+1 lap	
13	52	(Italy) Amato Ferrari	Peugeot 405	+2 laps	
14	55	(Italy) Maurizio Lusuardi	BMW 318i	+2 laps	
15	58	(Italy) Claudio Melotto	BMW 318i	+2 laps	
16	18	(Italy) Giorgio Francia	Alfa Romeo 155	+4 laps	
DNF	8	(Netherlands) Tom Coronel	BMW 318i		
DNF	15	(Italy) Giuseppe Gabbiani	Volkswagen Vento		
DNF	53	(Italy) Graziano Rossi	Vauxhall Cavalier		

- Fastest Lap: Roberto Ravaglia in 1.45.227 on lap 4

Race 2

Pos	No	Driver	Constructor	Time/Retired	Points
1	7	(Italy) Roberto Ravaglia	BMW 318i	30 laps in 52:50.738	20
2	4	(Italy) Fabrizio Giovanardi	Peugeot 405	+3.693s	15
3	5	(United Kingdom) Gary Ayles	Peugeot 405	+8.338s	12
4	21	(Italy) Emanuele Pirro	BMW 318i	+45.599s	10
5	1	(Italy) Gabriele Tarquini	Alfa Romeo 155	+46.855s	8
6	18	(Italy) Giorgio Francia	Alfa Romeo 155	+47.659s	6
7	12	(Italy) Stefano Modena	BMW 318i	+52.733s	4
8	3	(Italy) Tamara Vidali	Alfa Romeo 155	+1.14.905s	3
9	19	(Italy) Alessandro Nannini	Alfa Romeo 155	+1.45.249s	2
10	51	(Italy) Moreno Soli	Alfa Romeo 155	+1.46.132s	1
11	11	(Germany) Alexander Burgstaller	BMW 318i	+8 laps	
12	58	(Italy) Claudio Melotto	BMW 318i	+10 laps	
13	15	(Italy) Giuseppe Gabbiani	Volkswagen Vento	+13 laps	
14	55	(Italy) Massimo Piacentini	BMW 318i	+15 laps	
DNF	16	(Italy) Rinaldo Capello	Volkswagen Vento		
DNF	8	(Netherlands) Tom Coronel	BMW 318i		
DNF	53	(Italy) Renato Prioli	Vauxhall Cavalier		
DNF	52	(Italy) Amato Ferrari	Peugeot 405		
DNF	6	(Italy) Mauro Baldi	Peugeot 405		

- Fastest Lap: Roberto Ravaglia in 1.44.714 on lap 25

=== Championship standings after Round 9 ===
Drivers' Championship standings

Pos	Driver	Points
1	(Italy) Roberto Ravaglia	224
2	(Italy) Fabrizio Giovanardi	191
3	(Italy) Gabriele Tarquini	187
4	(United Kingdom) Gary Ayles	168
5	(Venezuela) Johnny Cecotto	159

Constructors' Championship standings

Pos	Constructor	Points
1	(Germany) BMW	449
2	(France) Peugeot	399
3	(Italy) Alfa Romeo	339
4	(Germany) Opel	22

== Round 10 (Italy) Mugello ==
Qualifying

Pos	No	Driver	Car	Lap Time
1	1	(Italy) Gabriele Tarquini	Alfa Romeo 155	2.16.667
2	4	(Italy) Fabrizio Giovanardi	Peugeot 405	2.17.316
3	21	(Italy) Emanuele Pirro	BMW 318i	2.17.631
4	19	(Italy) Alessandro Nannini	Alfa Romeo 155	2.18.154
5	52	(Italy) Amato Ferrari	Peugeot 405	2.18.197
6	5	(United Kingdom) Gary Ayles	Peugeot 405	2.18.281
7	3	(Italy) Tamara Vidali	Alfa Romeo 155	2.18.239
8	11	(Germany) Alexander Burgstaller	BMW 318iS	2.18.281
9	18	(Italy) Giorgio Francia	Alfa Romeo 155	2.18.764
10	12	(Italy) Stefano Modena	BMW 318i	2.18.898
11	55	(Italy) Ivan Capelli	Nissan Primera	2.20.304
12	16	(Italy) Rinaldo Capello	Volkswagen Vento	2.20.890
13	28	(Italy) Marco Antonelli	BMW 318i	2.20.976
14	7	(Italy) Roberto Ravaglia	BMW 318i	2.21.491
15	61	(Italy) Massimo Pigoli	BMW 318i	2.22.520
16	67	(Italy) Luca Maggiorelli	Opel Vectra Gsi	2.22.968
17	58	(Italy) Claudio Melotto	BMW 318i	2.22.992
18	8	(Italy) Patrick Crinelli	BMW 318i	2.23.429
19	55	(Italy) Massimo Piacentini	BMW M3	2.24.173
20	53	(Italy) Renato Prioli	Vauxhall Cavalier	2.24.461
21	15	(Italy) Giuseppe Gabbiani	Volkswagen Vento	2.24.605
22	62	(Italy) Gianluca Roda	BMW 318i	2.31.144

Race 1

Pos	No	Driver	Constructor	Time/Retired	Points
1	1	(Italy) Gabriele Tarquini	Alfa Romeo 155	11 laps in 25:22.320	20
2	4	(Italy) Fabrizio Giovanardi	Peugeot 405	+6.741s	15
3	5	(United Kingdom) Gary Ayles	Peugeot 405	+19.642s	12
4	21	(Italy) Emanuele Pirro	BMW 318i	+21.601s	10
5	18	(Italy) Giorgio Francia	Alfa Romeo 155	+29.611s	8
6	19	(Italy) Alessandro Nannini	Alfa Romeo 155	+53.387s	6
7	23	(Italy) Ivan Capelli	Nissan Primera	+1.25.052s	4
8	61	(Italy) Massimo Pigoli	BMW 318i	+2.05.749s	3
9	7	(Italy) Roberto Ravaglia	BMW 318i	+2.22.038s	2
10	58	(Italy) Claudio Melotto	BMW 318i	+2.25.682s	1
11	28	(Italy) Marco Antonelli	BMW 318i	+2.30.340s	
12	55	(Italy) Massimo Piacentini	BMW M3	+3.18.917s	
13	62	(Italy) Gianluca Roda	BMW 318i	+1 lap	
14	12	(Italy) Stefano Modena	BMW 318i	+1 lap	
15	8	(Italy) Patrick Crinelli	BMW 318i	+5 laps	
16	3	(Italy) Tamara Vidali	Alfa Romeo 155	+6 laps	
17	52	(Italy) Amato Ferrari	Peugeot 405	+6 laps	
DNF	11	(Germany) Alexander Burgstaller	BMW 318i		
DNF	67	(Italy) Luca Maggiorelli	Opel Vectra Gsi		
DNF	53	(Italy) Renato Prioli	Vauxhall Cavalier		
DNF	15	(Italy) Giuseppe Gabbiani	Volkswagen Vento		
DNS	16	(Italy) Rinaldo Capello	Volkswagen Vento		

- Fastest Lap: Fabrizio Giovanardi in 2.02.970 on lap 4

Race 2

Pos	No	Driver	Constructor	Time/Retired	Points
1	4	(Italy) Fabrizio Giovanardi	Peugeot 405	18 laps in 37:27.494	20
2	18	(Italy) Giorgio Francia	Alfa Romeo 155	+5.668s	15
3	19	(Italy) Alessandro Nannini	Alfa Romeo 155	+14.090s	12
4	7	(Italy) Roberto Ravaglia	BMW 318i	+16.683s	10
5	11	(Germany) Alexander Burgstaller	BMW 318i	+23.598s	8
6	52	(Italy) Amato Ferrari	Peugeot 405	+1.12.128s	6
7	23	(Italy) Ivan Capelli	Nissan Primera	+1.19.923s	4
8	67	(Italy) Luca Maggiorelli	Opel Vectra Gsi	+1.21.940s	3
9	12	(Italy) Stefano Modena	BMW 318i	+1.32.386s	2
10	8	(Italy) Patrick Crinelli	BMW 318i	+1.46.442s	1
DNF	1	(Italy) Gabriele Tarquini	Alfa Romeo 155		
DNF	5	(United Kingdom) Gary Ayles	Peugeot 405		
DNF	21	(Italy) Emanuele Pirro	BMW 318i		
DNF	61	(Italy) Massimo Pigoli	BMW 318i		
DNF	58	(Italy) Claudio Melotto	BMW 318i		
DNF	55	(Italy) Maurizio Lusuardi	BMW M3		
DNF	62	(Italy) Gianluca Roda	BMW 318i		
DNF	3	(Italy) Tamara Vidali	Alfa Romeo 155		
DNF	15	(Italy) Giuseppe Gabbiani	Volkswagen Vento		
DNF	53	(Italy) Renato Prioli	Vauxhall Cavalier		
DSQ	28	(Italy) Marco Antonelli	BMW 318i		
DNS	16	(Italy) Rinaldo Capello	Volkswagen Vento		

- Fastest Lap: Fabrizio Giovanardi in 2.02.970 on lap 4

=== Championship standings after Round 10 ===
Drivers' Championship standings

Pos	Driver	Points
1	(Italy) Roberto Ravaglia	233 (236)
2	(Italy) Fabrizio Giovanardi	226
3	(Italy) Gabriele Tarquini	207
4	(United Kingdom) Gary Ayles	180
5	(Venezuela) Johnny Cecotto	159

Constructors' Championship standings

Pos	Constructor	Points
1	(Germany) BMW	480
2	(France) Peugeot	452
3	(Italy) Alfa Romeo	394
4	(Germany) Opel	25
5	(Japan) Nissan	8

== Championship standings ==
Points system
**1st**	**2nd**	**3rd**	**4th**	**5th**	**6th**	**7th**	**8th**	**9th**	**10th**
20	15	12	10	8	6	4	3	2	1

- 18 results from 20 are valid for the championship

=== Drivers' Championship ===
Pos	Driver	Car	MON (Italy)		VAL (Italy)		MIS (Italy)		MAG (Italy)		BIN (Italy)		IMO (Italy)		VAR (Italy)		MIS (Italy)		PER (Italy)		MUG (Italy)		Pts
1	(Italy) Roberto Ravaglia	BMW	1	2	1	1	5	7	4	3	5	3	5	2	2	(10)	7	3	1	1	(9)	4	**233** (236)
2	(Italy) Fabrizio Giovanardi	Peugeot	10	4	11	7	2	DSQ	6	13	1	2	1	3	3	1	6	1	2	2	2	1	**226**
3	(Italy) Gabriele Tarquini	Alfa Romeo	3	12			1	Ret	2	2	2	1	2	15	1	2	1	Ret	3	5	1	Ret	**207**
4	(United Kingdom) Gary Ayles	Peugeot	4	3	3	3	9	1	8	6	4	4	4	5	5	5	2	Ret	4	3	3	Ret	**180**
5	(Venezuela) Johnny Cecotto	BMW	2	1	2	2	Ret	3	5	14	13	5	3	1	4	9	3	4					**159**
6	(Italy) Tamara Vidali	Alfa Romeo	6	5	5	11	6	5	3	4	3	11	16	Ret			5	5	9	8	16	Ret	**91**
7	(Germany) Alexander Burgstaller	BMW	5	11	13	5	4	2	9	5	9	6	6	13	9	8	8	7	7	11	Ret	5	**89**
8	(Italy) Amato Ferrari	Peugeot	7	6	6	14	3	4	7	7	8	Ret	18	6	Ret	Ret	11	6	13	Ret	17	6	**67**
9	(Italy) Gianni Morbidelli	Alfa Romeo					Ret	9	1	1	14	Ret	Ret	7	16	3	16	Ret					**58**
10	(Italy) Giorgio Francia	Alfa Romeo															4	2	16	6	5	2	**54**
11	(Italy) Filippo Salvarani	BMW	DNS	Ret	12	6	7	Ret	13	8	7	8	7	4	6	4	10	8					**54**
12	(Italy) Stefano Modena	BMW	8	9	Ret	Ret	8	6	15	11	6	7	8	12	8	6	9	Ret	10	7	14	9	**45**
13	(Italy) Emanuele Pirro	BMW																	5	4	4	Ret	**28**
14	(Italy) Alessandro Nannini	Alfa Romeo																	8	9	6	3	**23**
15	(Italy) Graziano Rossi	Vauxhall Cavalier	9	Ret	4	8	11	10	11	Ret					13	15	12	15	Ret				**16,5**
16	(Italy) Federico d'Amore	BMW	13	8	7	9	10	8	Ret	10	12	12	Ret	Ret									**13,5**
17	(France) Laurent Aïello	BMW			10	4																	**11**
18	(Italy) Massimo Pigoli	BMW	14	7			13	12	10	9	15	10	13	Ret	Ret	19	13	12			8	Ret	**11**
**19**	(Italy) Luca Maggiorelli	Opel			Ret	12	14	11	Ret	12			9	10	10	17	18	9			Ret	8	**9**
20	(Italy) Ivan Capelli	Nissan													12	13	Ret	16			7	7	**8**
21	(Italy) Stefano Buttiero	Alfa Romeo													7	7							**8**
22	(Italy) Mauro Baldi	Peugeot																	6	Ret			**6**
23	(Italy) Maurizio Lusuardi	BMW	12	13	8	10	Ret	Ret					11	14	15	16			14			Ret	**4**
24	(Italy) Claudio Melotto	BMW	15	10	9	13									14	Ret	17	14	15	12	10	Ret	**4**
25	(Italy) Andrea Montermini	BMW											15	8									**3**
26	(Italy) Marco Antonelli	BMW											10	9	11	11	20	11			11	DSQ	**3**
27	(Italy) Gianluca Roda	BMW					12	Ret	12	15	10	9	12	Ret	Ret	18	15	Ret			13	Ret	**3**
28	(Italy) Moreno Soli	Alfa Romeo											14	11	17	12	Ret	10	11	10			**2**
29	(Italy) Patrick Crinelli	BMW																			15	10	**1**
	(Italy) Rocco Peduzzi	BMW			14	Ret																	**0**
	(Italy) Rinaldo Capello	Volkswagen	Ret	Ret	15	Ret			14	Ret	11	Ret	17	Ret	Ret	14	14	13	12	Ret	DNS	DNS	**0**
	(Italy) Massimo Piacentini	BMW																		14	12		**0**
	(Italy) Giuseppe Gabbiani	Volkswagen	Ret	DNS	Ret	Ret			Ret	Ret	16	Ret			Ret	Ret	19	Ret	Ret	13	Ret	Ret	**0**
	(Italy) Renato Prioli	Opel																		Ret			**0**
	(Netherlands) Tom Coronel	BMW																	Ret	Ret			**0**
	(France) Fabien Giroix	Seat															Ret	Ret					**0**
	(Switzerland) Franco Franzi	Opel	DNP	DNP																			**0**
Pos	Driver	Car	MON (Italy)		VAL (Italy)		MAG (Italy)		BIN (Italy)		MIS (Italy)		VAL (Italy)		MUG (Italy)		PER (Italy)		VAR (Italy)		MUG (Italy)		Pts

Colour	Result
Gold	Winner
Silver	Second place
Bronze	Third place
Green	Points classification
Blue	Non-points classification
Blue	Non-classified finish (NC)
Purple	Retired, not classified (Ret)
Red	Did not qualify (DNQ)
Red	Did not pre-qualify (DNPQ)
Black	Disqualified (DSQ)
White	Did not start (DNS)
White	Withdrew (WD)
White	Race cancelled (C)
Blank	Did not practice (DNP)
Blank	Did not arrive (DNA)
Blank	Excluded (EX)

**Bold** – Pole
Italics – Fastest Lap

=== Manufacturers' Trophy ===
Pos	Manufacturer	MON (Italy)		VAL (Italy)		MIS (Italy)		MAG (Italy)		BIN (Italy)		IMO (Italy)		VAR (Italy)		MIS (Italy)		PER (Italy)		MUG (Italy)		Pts
1	(Germany) BMW	1	1	1	1	4	2	4	3	5	3	3	1	2	4	3	3	1	1	4	4	**480**
1	(Germany) BMW	2	2	2	2	5	3	5	5	6	5	5	2	4	6	7	4	5	4	8	5	**480**
2	(France) Peugeot	4	3	3	3	2	1	6	6	1	2	1	3	3	1	2	1	2	2	2	1	**452**
2	(France) Peugeot	7	4	6	7	3	4	7	7	4	4	4	5	5	5	6	6	4	3	3	6	**452**
3	(Italy) Alfa Romeo	3	5	5	11	1	5	1	1	2	1	2	7	1	2	1	2	3	5	1	2	**394**
3	(Italy) Alfa Romeo	6	12			6	9	2	2	3	11	16	15	7	3	4	5	8	6	5	3	**394**
4	(Germany) Opel- (United Kingdom) Vauxhall	9	Ret	4	8	11	10	11	Ret					13	15	12	15	Ret				**25,5**
4	(Germany) Opel- (United Kingdom) Vauxhall			Ret	12	14	11	Ret	12			9	10	10	17	18	9			Ret	8	**25,5**
5	(Japan) Nissan													12	13	Ret	16			7	7	**8**
6	(Germany) Volkswagen	Ret	DNS	Ret	Ret			Ret	Ret	16	Ret			Ret	Ret	19	Ret	Ret	13	Ret	Ret	0
6	(Germany) Volkswagen	Ret	Ret	15	Ret			14	Ret	11	Ret	17	Ret	Ret	14	14	13	12	Ret	DNS	DNS	0
	(Spain) SEAT															DNP	DNP					0

Colour	Result
Gold	Winner
Silver	Second place
Bronze	Third place
Green	Points classification
Blue	Non-points classification
Blue	Non-classified finish (NC)
Purple	Retired, not classified (Ret)
Red	Did not qualify (DNQ)
Red	Did not pre-qualify (DNPQ)
Black	Disqualified (DSQ)
White	Did not start (DNS)
White	Withdrew (WD)
White	Race cancelled (C)
Blank	Did not practice (DNP)
Blank	Did not arrive (DNA)
Blank	Excluded (EX)

=== Privateers' Trophy ===
Pos	Driver	Car	MON (Italy)		VAL (Italy)		MIS (Italy)		MAG (Italy)		BIN (Italy)		IMO (Italy)		VAR (Italy)		MIS (Italy)		PER (Italy)		MUG (Italy)		Pts
1	(Italy) Amato Ferrari	Peugeot	1	1	2		1	1	1	1	1			1			1	1	2			1	**250**
2	(Italy) Graziano Rossi	Vauxhall	2		1	1	2	2	3						3	3	2	7					**140**
3	(Italy) Massimo Pigoli	BMW	5	2			4	3	2	2	3	2	4				3	5					**132**
4	(Italy) Gianluca Roda	BMW					3		4		2	1	3				4				2		**94**
5	(Italy) Maurizio Lusuardi	BMW	4		3	2							2	4	5	4			3				**92**
6	(Italy) Moreno Soli	Alfa Romeo											5	3		2		3	1	1			**87**
7	(Italy) Marco Antonelli	BMW											1	2	2	1		4					**80**
8	(Italy) Claudio Melotto	BMW	6	3	4										4		5	6	4	2			**77**
9	(Italy) Luca Maggiorelli	Opel													1	5	6	2				2	**64**
10	(Italy) Massimo Piacentini	BMW																			1		**20**
11	(Italy) Rocco Peduzzi	BMW	3																				**12**
	(Italy) Renato Prioli	Vauxhall																					0
	(France) Fabien Giroix	SEAT																					0
	(Switzerland) Franco Franzi	Opel																					0
