= 1990 British Formula 3000 Championship =

Seasons
- ← 1989 1991 →

The 1990 British Formula 3000 Championship was the second season of the British Formula 3000 Championship. The series was won by Portugal's Pedro Chaves, driving the latest Reynard 90D for Mansell Madgwick Motosport, the team founded by Nigel Mansell. Chaves attempted to qualify the Coloni in F1 the following year without success, before moving to Indy Lights and Spanish touring cars. Runner up in the series was future touring car star Alain Menu driving for both Roni and CoBRa. Richard Dean, future Rover Turbo Cup champion, was best of the British contingent in third place with CoBRa. He concentrated on the series full-time after abandoning an International F3000 season due to mony problems. Rickard Rydell finished fourth overall for the AJS team.

== Drivers and teams ==
The following drivers and teams contested the 1990 British Formula 3000 Championship.

Team	Chassis	Engine	No.	Driver	Rounds
(United Kingdom) Mansell Madgwick Motorsport	Reynard	Cosworth	2	(Portugal) Pedro Chaves	All
(United Kingdom) Mansell Madgwick Motorsport	Reynard	Cosworth	3	(United Kingdom) David Button	8-9
(United Kingdom) Mansell Madgwick Motorsport	Reynard	Cosworth	3	(United Kingdom) Tim Harvey	10
(United Kingdom) Mansell Madgwick Motorsport	Reynard	Cosworth	17	(Brazil) Marco Greco	10
(United Kingdom) Mansell Madgwick Motorsport	Reynard	Cosworth	96	(United Kingdom) Peter Hardman	6-10
(United Kingdom) Worswick Engineering	Reynard	Cosworth	4	(United Kingdom) Tony Worswick	1–2, 4–6, 9-10
(United Kingdom) Team AJS	Reynard	Cosworth	5	(Sweden) Rickard Rydell	1–4, 6-10
(United Kingdom) Omegaland	Reynard	Cosworth	6	(United Kingdom) Mark Newman	1, 3, 5–7, 10
(United Kingdom) Omegaland	Reynard	Cosworth	22	(United Kingdom) Geoff Janes	9
(United Kingdom) Bell Racing	Ralt	Cosworth	7	(United Kingdom) Richard Jones	1–4, 10
(United Kingdom) GA Motorsport	Lola	Cosworth	8	(United Kingdom) Mark Peters	1-4
(United Kingdom) GA Motorsport	Lola	Cosworth	8	(Italy) Massimo "Gimax Jnr" Franchi	8-10
(United Kingdom) GA Motorsport	Lola	Cosworth	9	(Italy) Vittorio Zoboli	All
(United Kingdom) GA Motorsport	Reynard	Cosworth	44	(France) Thierry Delubac	8-9
(United Kingdom) CoBRa Motorsport	Reynard	Cosworth	10	(United Kingdom) Richard Dean	1–8, 10
(United Kingdom) CoBRa Motorsport	Reynard	Cosworth	10	(Switzerland) Alain Menu	9
(United Kingdom) CoBRa Motorsport	Reynard	Cosworth	11	(Switzerland) Alain Menu	7
(United Kingdom) CoBRa Motorsport	Reynard	Cosworth	11	(Portugal) António Simões	10
(United Kingdom) CoBRa Motorsport	Reynard	Cosworth	60	(Switzerland) Alain Menu	8
(United Kingdom) CoBRa Motorsport	Reynard	Cosworth	60	(United Kingdom) Gary Ward	9-10
(United Kingdom) Roni Motorsport	Reynard	Cosworth	14	(Italy) Paolo Delle Piane	1-7
(United Kingdom) Roni Motorsport	Reynard	Cosworth	14	(United Kingdom) Julian Westwood	8-10
(United Kingdom) Roni Motorsport	Reynard	Cosworth	15	(Italy) Antonio Tamburini	1
(United Kingdom) Roni Motorsport	Reynard	Cosworth	15	(Switzerland) Alain Menu	2-5
(United Kingdom) Roni Motorsport	Reynard	Cosworth	15	(Mexico) Fernando Plata	6-8
(United Kingdom) Roni Motorsport	Reynard	Cosworth	15	(Japan) Shigeki Matsui	9-10
(United Kingdom) Roni Motorsport	Reynard	Cosworth	73	(Mexico) Fernando Plata	9-10
(United Kingdom) Longfield Racing	Reynard	Cosworth	16	(United Kingdom) Jeremy Payne	2
(United Kingdom) Longfield Racing	Reynard	Cosworth	17	(United Kingdom) Geoff Kennedy	2
(United Kingdom) Longfield Racing	Reynard	Cosworth	17	(United Kingdom) Chris Hodgetts	3
(United Kingdom) Longfield Racing	Reynard	Cosworth	17	(Brazil) Marco Greco	6-7
(United Kingdom) Hepworth Racing	Reynard	Cosworth	16	(Canada) Danny Boutin	10
(Italy) Crypton Engineering	March	Cosworth	18	(Italy) Amato Ferrari	1-3
(United Kingdom) Simpson Engineering	Ralt	Cosworth	21	(United Kingdom) Robin Smith	1–3, 6-8
(United Kingdom) Usher Racing Organisation	Reynard	Cosworth	33	(United Kingdom) Eugene O'Brien	9
(United Kingdom) Superpower	Reynard	Cosworth	35	(United Kingdom) Phil Andrews	10
(United Kingdom) Mako/McNeil	Reynard	Cosworth	77	(United Kingdom) James Shead	1–2, 5–7, 10
(United Kingdom) RCR 3000	Lola	Cosworth	55	(United Kingdom) David Hunt	5

== Results ==
=== British Formula 3000 Championship ===
Date	Round	Circuit	Pole position	Fastest lap	Winning driver	Winning team
1	April 1	(United Kingdom) Brands Hatch (Indy)	(Sweden) Rickard Rydell	(Italy) Vittorio Zoboli	(Sweden) Rickard Rydell	Team AJS
2	April 13	(United Kingdom) Oulton Park	(Sweden) Rickard Rydell	(Switzerland) Alain Menu	(Switzerland) Alain Menu	Roni Motorsport
3	April 16	(United Kingdom) Thruxton	(Portugal) Pedro Chaves	(Portugal) Pedro Chaves	(Portugal) Pedro Chaves	Mansell Madgwick Motorsport
4	May 7	(United Kingdom) Snetterton	(Sweden) Rickard Rydell	(Portugal) Pedro Chaves	(Switzerland) Alain Menu	Roni Motorsport
5	May 28	(United Kingdom) Brands Hatch (Indy)	(Portugal) Pedro Chaves	(Portugal) Pedro Chaves	(Portugal) Pedro Chaves	Mansell Madgwick Motorsport
6	July 1	(United Kingdom) Brands Hatch (Indy)	(Portugal) Pedro Chaves	(Portugal) Pedro Chaves	(Brazil) Marco Greco	Longfield
7	August 12	(United Kingdom) Oulton Park	(United Kingdom) Richard Dean	(United Kingdom) Richard Dean	(United Kingdom) Richard Dean	CoBRa Motorsport
8	September 9	(United Kingdom) Brands Hatch (GP)	(Switzerland) Alain Menu	(Portugal) Pedro Chaves	(Portugal) Pedro Chaves	Mansell Madgwick Motorsport
9	September 29	(United Kingdom) Silverstone (National)	(Portugal) Pedro Chaves	(Sweden) Rickard Rydell	(Portugal) Pedro Chaves	Mansell Madgwick Motorsport
10	October 14	(United Kingdom) Donington Park	(United Kingdom) Phil Andrews	(Portugal) Pedro Chaves	(Portugal) Pedro Chaves	Mansell Madgwick Motorsport

== Championship Standings ==
Pos.	Driver	BHI	OUL	THR	SNE	BHI	BHI	OUL	BGP	SIL	DON	Points
1	(Portugal) Pedro Chaves	4	3	1	2	1	Ret	3	1	1	1	62
2	(Switzerland) Alain Menu		1	3	1	2	Ret	2	8†	DNS		34
3	(United Kingdom) Richard Dean	2	2	Ret	3	DNS	Ret	1	2		Ret	31
4	(Sweden) Rickard Rydell	1	6	Ret	Ret		DNS	Ret	4	2	5	21
5	(Italy) Vittorio Zoboli	Ret	4	2	Ret	3	Ret	Ret	Ret	4	Ret	16
6	(United Kingdom) Peter Hardman						2	4	Ret	5	3	15
7	(Italy) Paolo Delle Piane	5	5	4	Ret	4	Ret	DNS			10	10
8	(Brazil) Marco Greco						1	Ret			Ret	9
9	(United Kingdom) James Shead	8	Ret			6	3	Ret		10		5
10	(United Kingdom) Julian Westwood								3	8	6	5
11	(United Kingdom) Gary Ward									3	11	4
12	(United Kingdom) Tony Worswick	Ret	DNS		4	7	Ret			11	13	3
13	(Portugal) António Simões										4	3
14	(United Kingdom) Robin Smith	NC	7	7			Ret	5	NC			2
15	(Italy) Amato Ferrari	Ret	Ret	5								2
16	(United Kingdom) David Button								5	Ret		2
17	(United Kingdom) David Hunt					5						2
18	(Italy) Massimo Franchi								6	6	DNS	2
19	(United Kingdom) Mark Newman	7		8		Ret	DNS	6			12	1
20	(United Kingdom) Mark Peters	6	Ret	DNS	DNS							1
21	(United Kingdom) Chris Hodgetts	DNS		6								1
22	(Mexico) Fernando Plata						Ret	Ret	7	9	9	0
23	(United Kingdom) Andrew Hepworth							7				0
24	(United Kingdom) Eugene O'Brien									7		0
25	(United Kingdom) Richard Jones	9	8	Ret	Ret						DNS	0
26	(New Zealand) Mike Bryan					8						0
27	(United Kingdom) Tim Harvey										8	0
28	(Italy) Guido Basile								9		Ret	0
29	(United Kingdom) Geoff Kennedy		9									0
30	(United Kingdom) John Dickinson			9								0
31	(United Kingdom) Geoff Janes									12		0
	(France) Thierry Delubac								Ret	Ret		
	(Japan) Shigeki Matsui									DNS	Ret	
	(Australia) Rohan Onslow						Ret					
	(Australia) Neil Crompton						Ret					
	(United Kingdom) Jeremy Payne		DNS									
Guest drivers ineligible for points
	(United Kingdom) Phil Andrews										2	
	(Italy) Antonio Tamburini	3										
