= Richard Dean (racing driver) =

British racing driver (born 1965)

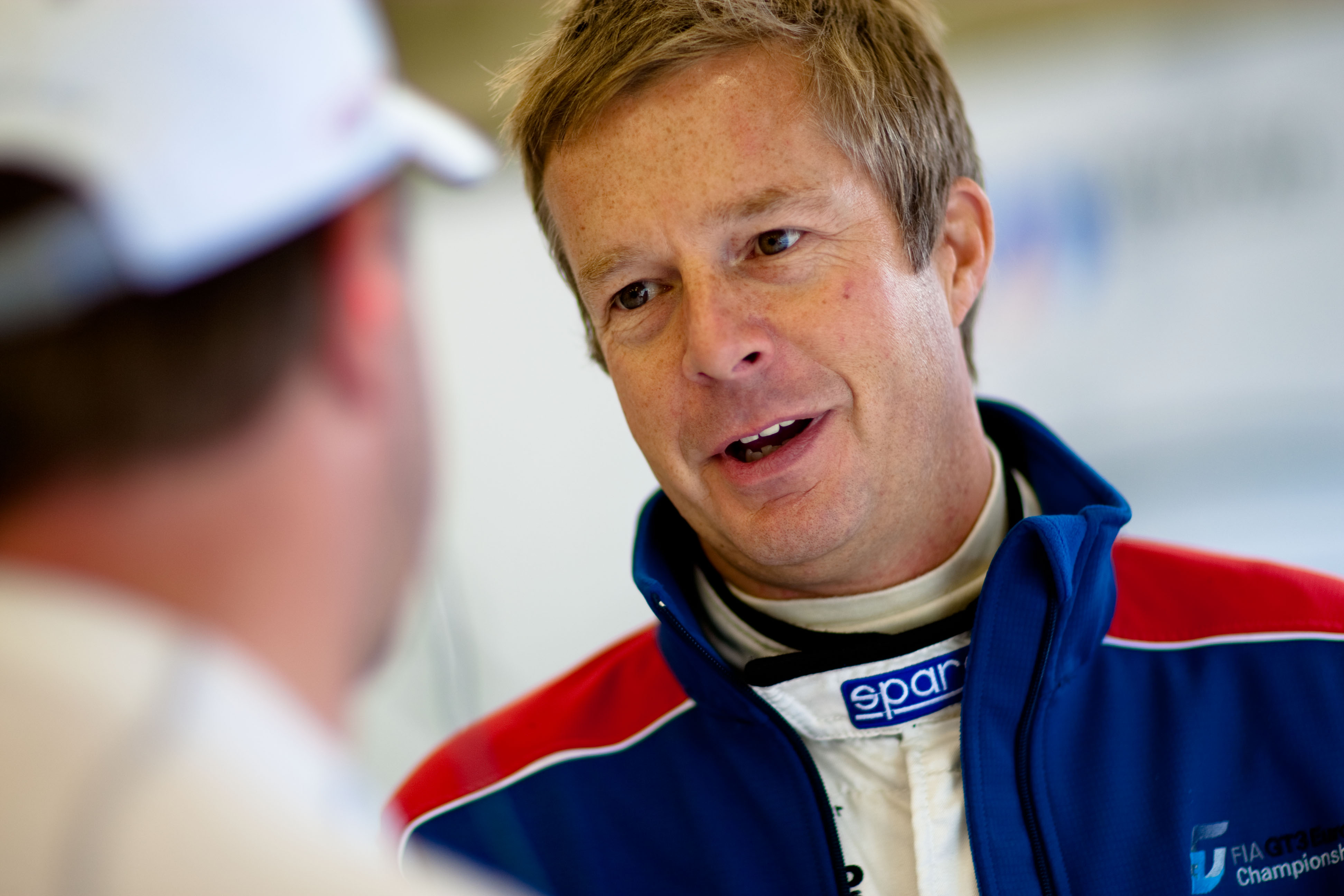
- Dean in 2010
- Nationality: (United Kingdom) British
- Born: Richard Antony Dean; 7 October 1965 (age 61) Leeds, Yorkshire, England
- Categorisation: FIA Gold (until 2014); FIA Bronze (2017–)

Richard Antony Dean (born 7 October 1965) is a former British racing driver who won the 24 Hours of Le Mans GT2 class in 2006. In 2010, Richard Dean founded the sports car racing team United Autosports with Zak Brown.

== Racing career ==
=== Early career ===
Dean started his competitive racing career in karts as a teenager. In 1985, Richard progressed to car racing in Formula Ford 1600. After multiple seasons in FF1600 with multiple race wins, and finishing sixth in the 1987 Formula Ford Festival, he moved up to contest the 1989 British F3 Championship. 1990 saw a move to Formula 3000 for the next two seasons, scoring top-six results in the International Formula 3000 Championship and winning the Oulton Park Gold Cup race in the 1990 British Formula 3000 Championship with Cobra Motorsport.

=== Japan ===
In 1992, Dean moved to Japan, prompted by the offer of a test by the LeMans company in F3. He stayed in Japan until 1995, racing in F3, F3000, GT, and Touring Cars. Following the test, Richard Dean raced with Team LeMans in the 1993 Japanese Formula 3 Championship and 1994 All-Japan GT Championship. In 1994, he raced with Tomei Sport Open in the Macau Grand Prix and Japanese Formula 3 Championship, placing fourth. In the same year, he raced with Team 5Zigen in the Japanese Formula 3000 Championship. In his final year of racing in Japan, 1995, Richard Dean contested the Japanese Touring Car Championship with Trans Global. Tom Kristensen, the most successful Lemans driver in history, was also racing in Japan at that time and became an acquaintance of Dean.

=== 1996-2006 ===
After returning to Europe, Dean won the 1996 Dunlop Rover Turbo Cup scoring nine wins in 16 races and winning the title by more than 100 points. In 1998, he won the British GT Championship driving an Oreca prepared Dodge Viper In 1999, Dean began racing in the American Le Mans Series – firstly in the prototype class (1999), then the GT class (2000 & 2002), LMP900 class (2001) and GT2 class (2005 & 2006). Dean also raced in the European Le Mans Series in 2001. In 2002, he was set to compete in the British Touring Car Championship in a Lexus IS200 with Total Motorsport, but this never eventuated. In 2006, Dean came second in the GT2 team championship standings with Team LNT.

=== 24 Hours of Le Mans ===
The same year, in 2006, Dean won the 24 Hours of Le Mans GT2 class. He was racing with fellow British co-drivers Lawrence Tomlinson and Tom Kimber-Smith as part of Team LNT. Dean started the race ninth-in-class and 24 hours later took the checkered flag first-in-class. Dean and the team made history that day as the only car to have beaten a Porsche in the GT2 class at Le Mans. Dean raced in the 24 Hours of Le Mans twice more, both with Team LNT. In 2007, he placed fifth in the GT class while in 2009, the team had a DNF.

== United Autosports ==
In 2009, Dean and long-term friend Zak Brown founded United Autosports, an Anglo-American motorsport race team and business based in West Yorkshire, UK.

In the early years, Dean and Brown raced for United Autosports. The team's first race was in the 2010 British GT Championship at Oulton Park. They had a two-car entry, with Mike Guasch and Mark Patterson in the #22 car and Richard Dean and Zak Brown in the #23 car. The same year, United Autosports entered the 2010 Spa 24 Hours. Dean, together with co-drivers Zak Brown, Eddie Cheever and Mark Blundell, placed third in the GT3 class.

United Autosports is now a championship-winning sports car racing team, competing in sports prototype and GT categories across the world including the European Le Mans Series, FIA World Endurance Championship, Asian Le Mans Series and GT4 European Series.

In 2020, United Autosports became the first team to win three endurance accolades in the same year – the European Le Mans Series, World Endurance Championship and the 24 Hours of Le Mans (LMP2 class).

It also has a dedicated historic team who race in classic events around the world including the Rolex Monterey Motorsports Reunion, Silverstone Classic, Velocity Invitational and Estoril Classic. Richard Dean has raced at a number of these events in cars from Zak Brown’s personal collection.

== Personal life ==
Dean lives in Yorkshire with his wife, former professional tennis player Alice Mackenzie, and dogs. He is the son of former racing driver Tony Dean and he has one daughter, Ashleigh, who was born in 1992.
