= 2003 FIA GT Magny-Cours 500km =

Layout of the Circuit de Nevers Magny-Cours

The 2003 FIA GT Magny-Cours 500 km was the second round the 2003 FIA GT Championship. It took place at the Circuit de Nevers Magny-Cours, France, on April 27, 2003.

== Official results ==
Class winners in bold. Cars failing to complete 70% of winner's distance marked as Not Classified (NC).

Pos	Class	No	Team	Drivers	Chassis	Tyre	Laps
Pos	Class	No	Team	Drivers	Engine	Tyre	Laps
1	**GT**	**23**	**(Italy) BMS Scuderia Italia**	**(Italy) Matteo Bobbi (Italy) Thomas Biagi**	**Ferrari 550-GTS Maranello**	MI	**104**
1	**GT**	**23**	**(Italy) BMS Scuderia Italia**	**(Italy) Matteo Bobbi (Italy) Thomas Biagi**	**Ferrari 5.9L V12**	MI	**104**
2	GT	22	(Italy) BMS Scuderia Italia	(Italy) Fabrizio Gollin (Italy) Luca Cappellari	Ferrari 550-GTS Maranello	MI	104
2	GT	22	(Italy) BMS Scuderia Italia	(Italy) Fabrizio Gollin (Italy) Luca Cappellari	Ferrari 5.9L V12	MI	104
3	GT	15	(United Kingdom) Lister Storm Racing	(Italy) Andrea Piccini (Switzerland) Jean-Denis Délétraz	Lister Storm	D	104
3	GT	15	(United Kingdom) Lister Storm Racing	(Italy) Andrea Piccini (Switzerland) Jean-Denis Délétraz	Jaguar 7.0L V12	D	104
4	GT	11	(Sweden) Roos Optima Racing Team	(Sweden) Henrik Roos (Sweden) Magnus Wallinder	Chrysler Viper GTS-R	D	101
4	GT	11	(Sweden) Roos Optima Racing Team	(Sweden) Henrik Roos (Sweden) Magnus Wallinder	Chrysler 8.0L V10	D	101
5	GT	8	(United Kingdom) Graham Nash Motorsport	(Portugal) Miguel Ramos (Portugal) Ni Amorim (Portugal) Pedro Chaves	Saleen S7-R	D	101
5	GT	8	(United Kingdom) Graham Nash Motorsport	(Portugal) Miguel Ramos (Portugal) Ni Amorim (Portugal) Pedro Chaves	Ford 7.0L V8	D	101
6	**N-GT**	**88**	**(United Kingdom) Team Maranello Concessionaires**	**(United Kingdom) Tim Mullen (United Kingdom) Jamie Davies**	**Ferrari 360 Modena GT**	D	**101**
6	**N-GT**	**88**	**(United Kingdom) Team Maranello Concessionaires**	**(United Kingdom) Tim Mullen (United Kingdom) Jamie Davies**	**Ferrari 3.6L V8**	D	**101**
7	N-GT	50	(Germany) Freisinger Motorsport	(Germany) Marc Lieb (France) Stéphane Ortelli	Porsche 911 GT3-RS	D	101
7	N-GT	50	(Germany) Freisinger Motorsport	(Germany) Marc Lieb (France) Stéphane Ortelli	Porsche 3.6L Flat-6	D	101
8	N-GT	58	(France) Auto Palace Compétition	(France) Steeve Hiesse (France) Guillaume Gomez	Ferrari 360 Modena GT	P	100
8	N-GT	58	(France) Auto Palace Compétition	(France) Steeve Hiesse (France) Guillaume Gomez	Ferrari 3.6L V8	P	100
9	GT	14	(United Kingdom) Lister Storm Racing	(United Kingdom) Jamie Campbell-Walter (United Kingdom) Nathan Kinch	Lister Storm	D	100
9	GT	14	(United Kingdom) Lister Storm Racing	(United Kingdom) Jamie Campbell-Walter (United Kingdom) Nathan Kinch	Jaguar 7.0L V12	D	100
10	N-GT	51	(Germany) Freisinger Motorsport	(Belgium) Bert Longin (Switzerland) Gabriele Gardel	Porsche 911 GT3-RS	D	99
10	N-GT	51	(Germany) Freisinger Motorsport	(Belgium) Bert Longin (Switzerland) Gabriele Gardel	Porsche 3.6L Flat-6	D	99
11	N-GT	54	(United Kingdom) Cirtek Motorsport	(France) Xavier Pompidou (United Kingdom) Richard Kaye	Porsche 911 GT3-R	D	99
11	N-GT	54	(United Kingdom) Cirtek Motorsport	(France) Xavier Pompidou (United Kingdom) Richard Kaye	Porsche 3.6L Flat-6	D	99
12	N-GT	52	(France) JMB Racing	(Italy) Andrea Bertolini (Italy) Fabrizio de Simone	Ferrari 360 Modena GT	P	98
12	N-GT	52	(France) JMB Racing	(Italy) Andrea Bertolini (Italy) Fabrizio de Simone	Ferrari 3.6L V8	P	98
13	N-GT	74	(United Kingdom) Team Eurotech	(United Kingdom) Mike Jordan (United Kingdom) Mark Sumpter	Porsche 911 GT3-RS	D	97
13	N-GT	74	(United Kingdom) Team Eurotech	(United Kingdom) Mike Jordan (United Kingdom) Mark Sumpter	Porsche 3.6L Flat-6	D	97
14	N-GT	99	(Germany) RWS Yukos Motorsport	(Austria) Walter Lechner, Jr. (France) Stéphane Daoudi	Porsche 911 GT3-R	P	96
14	N-GT	99	(Germany) RWS Yukos Motorsport	(Austria) Walter Lechner, Jr. (France) Stéphane Daoudi	Porsche 3.6L Flat-6	P	96
15	GT	6	(United Kingdom) Creation Autosportif	(United Kingdom) Bobby Verdon-Roe (Italy) Marco Zadra	Lister Storm	D	96
15	GT	6	(United Kingdom) Creation Autosportif	(United Kingdom) Bobby Verdon-Roe (Italy) Marco Zadra	Jaguar 7.0L V12	D	96
16	N-GT	77	(Germany) RWS Yukos Motorsport	(Russia) Nikolai Fomenko (Russia) Alexey Vasilyev	Porsche 911 GT3-RS	P	95
16	N-GT	77	(Germany) RWS Yukos Motorsport	(Russia) Nikolai Fomenko (Russia) Alexey Vasilyev	Porsche 3.6L Flat-6	P	95
17	N-GT	56	(Poland) Alda Motorsport	(Poland) Andrzej Dziurka (Poland) Wojciech Dobrzanski	Porsche 911 GT3-RS	D	95
17	N-GT	56	(Poland) Alda Motorsport	(Poland) Andrzej Dziurka (Poland) Wojciech Dobrzanski	Porsche 3.6L Flat-6	D	95
18	N-GT	53	(France) JMB Racing	(France) Antoine Gosse (Netherlands) Peter Kutemann	Ferrari 360 Modena N-GT	P	94
18	N-GT	53	(France) JMB Racing	(France) Antoine Gosse (Netherlands) Peter Kutemann	Ferrari 3.6L V8	P	94
19	GT	16	(Germany) Wieth Racing	(Germany) Wolfgang Kaufmann (Germany) Niko Wieth (Italy) Vittorio Zoboli	Ferrari 550 Maranello	D	84
19	GT	16	(Germany) Wieth Racing	(Germany) Wolfgang Kaufmann (Germany) Niko Wieth (Italy) Vittorio Zoboli	Ferrari 6.0L V12	D	84
20	N-GT	65	(France) Protonic Desbrueres	(France) Christopher Campbell (France) Philippe Brocard (France) Daniel Desbrueres	Porsche 911 GT3-RS	P	73
20	N-GT	65	(France) Protonic Desbrueres	(France) Christopher Campbell (France) Philippe Brocard (France) Daniel Desbrueres	Porsche 3.6L Flat-6	P	73
21	N-GT	61	(United Kingdom) EMKA Racing	(United Kingdom) Martin Short (United Kingdom) Tim Sugden	Porsche 911 GT3-R	D	72
21	N-GT	61	(United Kingdom) EMKA Racing	(United Kingdom) Martin Short (United Kingdom) Tim Sugden	Porsche 3.6L Flat-6	D	72
22 NC	GT	7	(United Kingdom) Graham Nash Motorsport	(United Kingdom) Mike Newton (Brazil) Thomas Erdos	Saleen S7-R	D	61
22 NC	GT	7	(United Kingdom) Graham Nash Motorsport	(United Kingdom) Mike Newton (Brazil) Thomas Erdos	Ford 7.0L V8	D	61
23 DNF	N-GT	55	(United Kingdom) Cirtek Motorsport	(United Kingdom) Ian Khan (United Kingdom) Adam Jones	Porsche 911 GT3-R	D	59
23 DNF	N-GT	55	(United Kingdom) Cirtek Motorsport	(United Kingdom) Ian Khan (United Kingdom) Adam Jones	Porsche 3.6L Flat-6	D	59
24 DNF	N-GT	64	(Italy) AB Motorsport	(Italy) Renato Premoli (Italy) Bruno Barbaro (Italy) Antonio De Castro	Porsche 911 GT3-RS	P	55
24 DNF	N-GT	64	(Italy) AB Motorsport	(Italy) Renato Premoli (Italy) Bruno Barbaro (Italy) Antonio De Castro	Porsche 3.6L Flat-6	P	55
25 DNF	GT	4	(Switzerland) Force One Racing Festina	(France) Philippe Alliot (France) David Hallyday (Switzerland) Steve Zacchia	Chrysler Viper GTS-R	P	49
25 DNF	GT	4	(Switzerland) Force One Racing Festina	(France) Philippe Alliot (France) David Hallyday (Switzerland) Steve Zacchia	Chrysler 8.0L V10	P	49
26 DNF	GT	18	(Netherlands) Zwaan's Racing	(Netherlands) Arjan van der Zwaan (Netherlands) Rob van der Zwaan (Germany) Klaus Abbelen	Chrysler Viper GTS-R	D	39
26 DNF	GT	18	(Netherlands) Zwaan's Racing	(Netherlands) Arjan van der Zwaan (Netherlands) Rob van der Zwaan (Germany) Klaus Abbelen	Chrysler 8.0L V10	D	39
27 DNF	N-GT	75	(United Kingdom) Team Eurotech	(United Kingdom) David Jones (United Kingdom) Godfrey Jones	Porsche 911 GT3-R	D	34
27 DNF	N-GT	75	(United Kingdom) Team Eurotech	(United Kingdom) David Jones (United Kingdom) Godfrey Jones	Porsche 3.6L Flat-6	D	34
28 DNF	GT	10	(France) JMB Racing	(France) Boris Derichebourg (France) David Terrien (Italy) Christian Pescatori	Ferrari 550 Maranello	P	28
28 DNF	GT	10	(France) JMB Racing	(France) Boris Derichebourg (France) David Terrien (Italy) Christian Pescatori	Ferrari 6.0L V12	P	28
29 DNF	GT	1	(France) Larbre Compétition	(France) Christophe Bouchut (France) Jean-Philippe Belloc	Chrysler Viper GTS-R	MI	27
29 DNF	GT	1	(France) Larbre Compétition	(France) Christophe Bouchut (France) Jean-Philippe Belloc	Chrysler 8.0L V10	MI	27
30 DNF	GT	5	(Switzerland) Force One Racing Festina (Netherlands) Carsport Holland	(Netherlands) Mike Hezemans (Belgium) Anthony Kumpen	Chrysler Viper GTS-R	P	18
30 DNF	GT	5	(Switzerland) Force One Racing Festina (Netherlands) Carsport Holland	(Netherlands) Mike Hezemans (Belgium) Anthony Kumpen	Chrysler 8.0L V10	P	18
31 DNF	GT	21	(United Kingdom) Care Racing (Italy) BMS Scuderia Italia	(Italy) Stefano Livio (Switzerland) Lilian Bryner (Switzerland) Enzo Calderari	Ferrari 550-GTS Maranello	MI	16
31 DNF	GT	21	(United Kingdom) Care Racing (Italy) BMS Scuderia Italia	(Italy) Stefano Livio (Switzerland) Lilian Bryner (Switzerland) Enzo Calderari	Ferrari 5.9L V12	MI	16
32 DNF	GT	12	(Germany) Proton Competition	(Germany) Christian Ried (Germany) Gerold Ried	Porsche 911 GT2	Y	15
32 DNF	GT	12	(Germany) Proton Competition	(Germany) Christian Ried (Germany) Gerold Ried	Porsche 3.6L Turbo Flat-6	Y	15
33 DNF	GT	9	(France) JMB Racing	(Austria) Philipp Peter (Italy) Fabio Babini	Ferrari 550 Maranello	P	14
33 DNF	GT	9	(France) JMB Racing	(Austria) Philipp Peter (Italy) Fabio Babini	Ferrari 6.0L V12	P	14
34 DNF	GT	2	(Germany) Konrad Motorsport	(Austria) Franz Konrad (Switzerland) Toni Seiler (France) Jean-Marc Gounon	Saleen S7-R	D	13
34 DNF	GT	2	(Germany) Konrad Motorsport	(Austria) Franz Konrad (Switzerland) Toni Seiler (France) Jean-Marc Gounon	Ford 7.0L V8	D	13
35 DNF	N-GT	57	(Czech Republic) MenX	(Czech Republic) Tomáš Enge (Czech Republic) Robert Pergl	Ferrari 360 Modena GT	D	10
35 DNF	N-GT	57	(Czech Republic) MenX	(Czech Republic) Tomáš Enge (Czech Republic) Robert Pergl	Ferrari 3.6L V8	D	10
DSQ^{†}	N-GT	89	(United Kingdom) Team Maranello Concessionaires	(United Kingdom) Darren Turner (United Kingdom) Kelvin Burt	Ferrari 360 Modena N-GT	D	101
DSQ^{†}	N-GT	89	(United Kingdom) Team Maranello Concessionaires	(United Kingdom) Darren Turner (United Kingdom) Kelvin Burt	Ferrari 3.6L V8	D	101

† – #89 Team Maranello Concessionaires was disqualified after the car failed post-race technical inspection. The car's fuel tank was found to be larger than the rules allowed.

== Statistics ==
- Pole position – #23 BMS Scuderia Italia – 1:55.642
- Fastest lap – #23 BMS Scuderia Italia – 1:38.625
- Average speed – 151.380 km/h

FIA GT Championship
Previous race: 2003 FIA GT Barcelona 500km	2003 season	Next race: 2003 FIA GT Pergusa 500km
