= Volkswagen Vento (A3) =

Small family car

Volkswagen Vento (A3, Typ 1H)
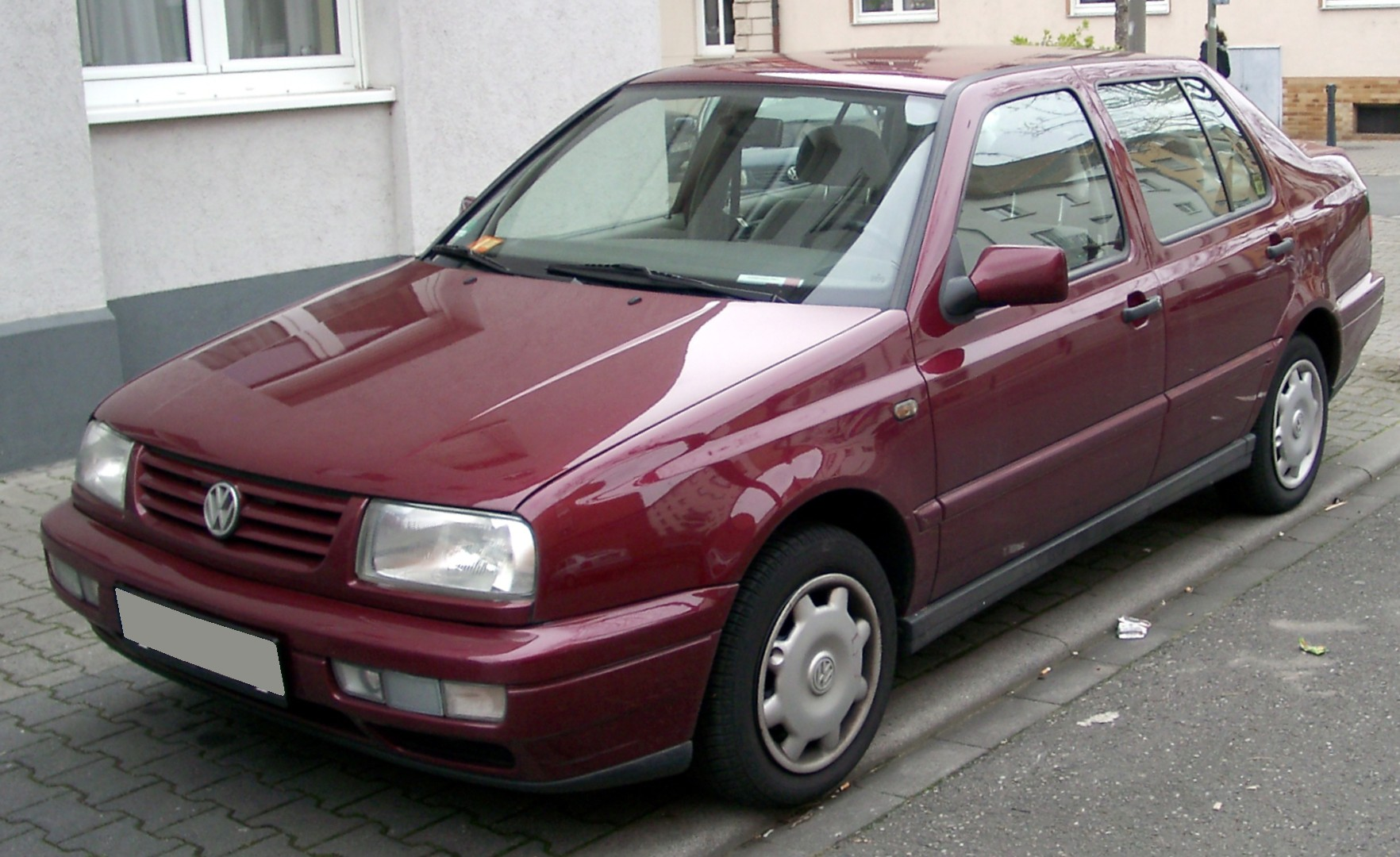

Overview
- Also called: Volkswagen Jetta
- Production: January 1992 – February 1999
- Model years: 1993–1999 (North America)
- Assembly: Germany: Wolfsburg; Germany: Osnabrück; South Africa: Uitenhage; Mexico: Puebla
- Designer: Herbert Schäfer

Body and chassis
- Body style: 4-door notchback sedan / saloon
- Layout: Front-engine, front-wheel-drive/four-wheel-drive
- Platform: Volkswagen Group A3 platform
- Related: Volkswagen Golf Mk3

Powertrain
- Engine: 1.6 L I4 (petrol); 1.8 L I4 (petrol); 2.0 L I4 (petrol); 2.8 L VR6 (petrol); 1.9 L I4 D (diesel); 1.9 L I4 TD (diesel); 1.9 L I4 SDI (diesel); 1.9 L I4 TDI (diesel)
- Transmission: 5-speed manual 4-speed automatic

Dimensions
- Wheelbase: 2,470 mm (97.2 in)
- Length: 4,400 mm (173.2 in)
- Width: 1,690 mm (66.5 in)
- Height: 1,430 mm (56.3 in)

Chronology
- Predecessor: Volkswagen Jetta (A2)
- Successor: Volkswagen Bora

The Volkswagen Vento is a small family car, the third generation of the Volkswagen Jetta and the successor to the Volkswagen Jetta (A2). For the third generation, the Jetta name was discontinued, and it was officially renamed the Volkswagen Vento in European countries, following the precedent of naming cars after winds, debuted in 1992. The Jetta 3 debuted in North America in 1993 after production delays and quality problems at the Volkswagen plant in Puebla, Mexico. The name "Vento" means "wind" in both Portuguese and Italian. It went on sale in most of Europe in the first quarter of the year, though it did not arrive on the British market until September 1992.

Because of the success of the second generation in North America, Volkswagen decided to keep the Jetta nameplate. However, in Europe the car was given its new name to appeal to a younger market.

Styling was penned by a design team led by Herbert Schäfer, and again the car became more aerodynamic than the previous generation. Although visually similar to the Mark 2, there were many refinements underneath. The two-door model was dropped, aerodynamics were improved, with the car now having a drag coefficient of 0.32. This included a new structure which now met worldwide crash standards. Suspensions were an evolutionary rather than revolutionary refinement of the setup on previous editions, and mainly consisted of a wider track, and even maintaining backwards compatibility with older models. In addition, the car became more environmentally friendly with the use of recycled plastics, CFC-free air conditioning systems, and paint that did not contain heavy metals.

This generation of the car is widely credited for keeping Volkswagen from pulling out of the North American market. At the time of its introduction in 1993, Volkswagen of America's sales hit a low not seen since the 1950s. The division sold only 43,902 cars in that year. Sales began slowly due to the aforementioned issues at the Puebla plant. However, sales rebounded dramatically in the following years, mostly based on the strength of the Jetta, which continued to be the best-selling Volkswagen in the USA.

== Safety ==
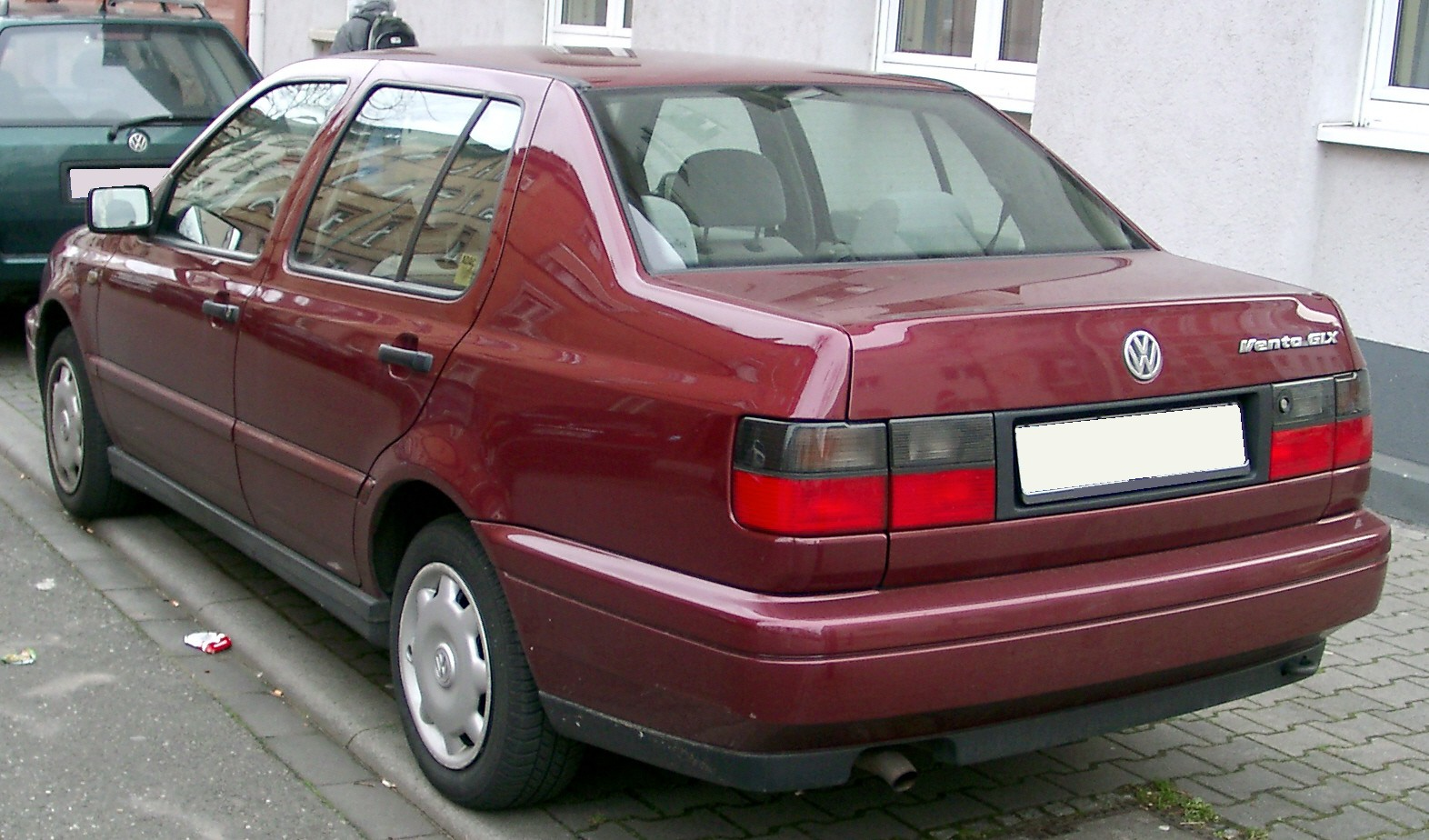
Volkswagen Vento (German specification)

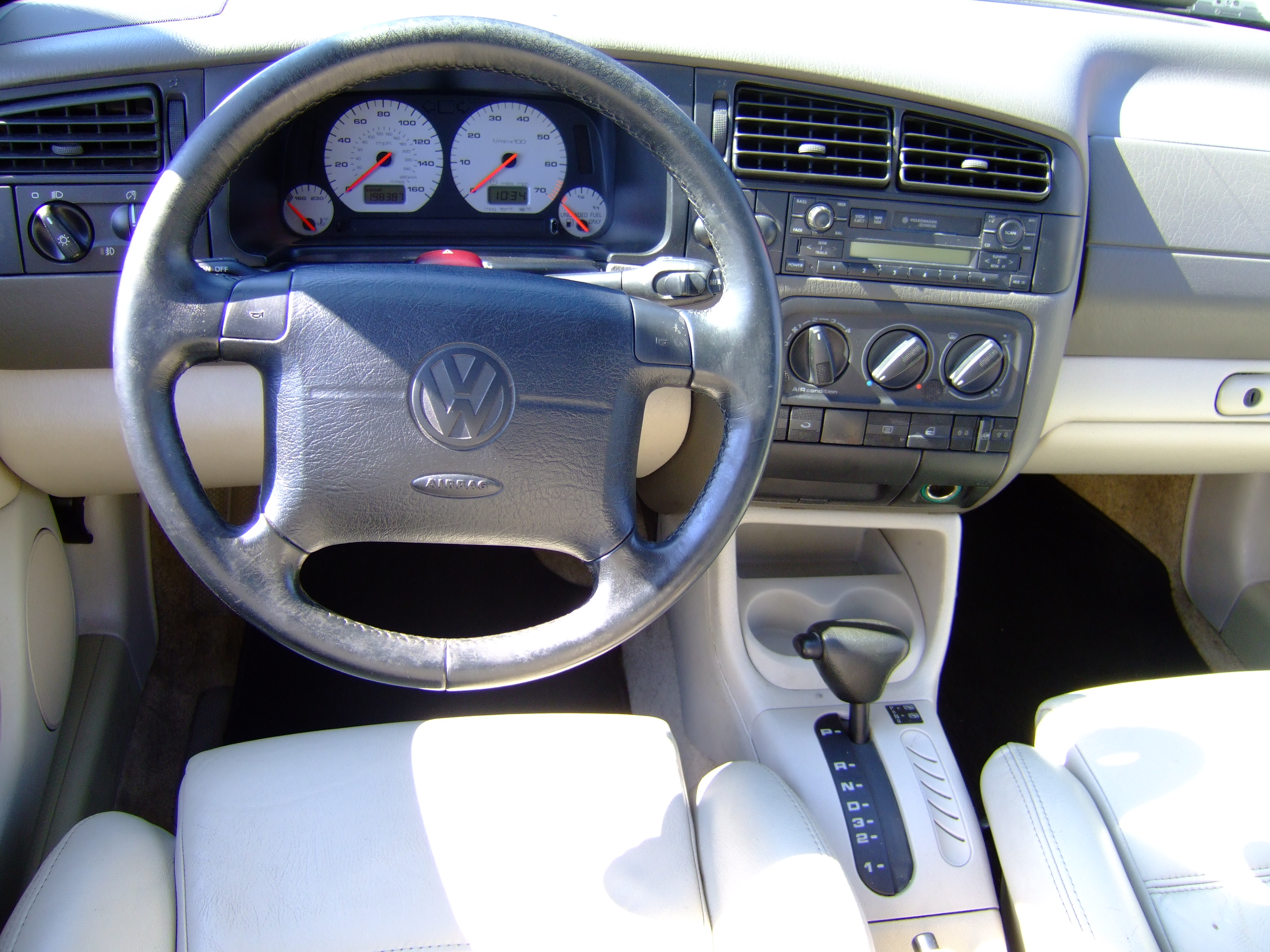
Interior

When equipped with dual airbags, the Jetta III (North American name) received three out of five stars in a 56 km/h (35 mph) frontal crash test carried out by the National Highway Traffic Safety Administration. In a 64 km/h (40 mph) frontal offset crash test conducted by the Insurance Institute for Highway Safety, the car received a score of "Marginal".

== Testing and review ==
Newly available on the third generation was Volkswagen Group's 1.9 litre Turbocharged Direct Injection (TDI) 66 kW (89 hp; 90 PS) diesel engine. Fuel economy was a strong point with ratings of 5.7 L/100 km (50 mpg_{‑imp}; 41 mpg_{‑US}) urban cycle and 4.8 L/100 km (59 mpg_{‑imp}; 49 mpg_{‑US}) extra urban. In top trim lines, the 2.8-litre VR6 DOHC six-cylinder engine was available. In one car magazine's test, the 128 kW (172 hp; 174 PS) power plant was able to accelerate the car from 0 to 97 km/h (60 mph) in 6.9 seconds.

Reviews were generally positive, with testers praising the crisp handling and comfortable ride, as well as a greater level of refinement compared with the previous generation. However, some reviews noted that the more sporty suspension tuning found in some trims made the car bouncy, especially on the expressway. The manual transmission shifted crisply; however, the automatic transmission reduced acceleration noticeably. Some critics complained that the controls had some quirks, including a cryptic windshield wiper control, where the "off" position was unfittingly placed between the "intermittent" and "continuous" modes. If equipped, power window controls had the unusual arrangement of the front buttons located on the door, while the rear buttons were located on the center console. As with previous generations, the luggage compartment provided generous space. In earlier build cars, the glove compartment was deleted if the car was equipped with dual airbags, and in the later models (when airbags became standard equipment), the glove compartment was small and could barely hold the owner's manual and a folding paper map. There were also some complaints about the lack of cup holders in the earlier cars, as well as the lack of a safety interlock which would require the driver to press the clutch pedal prior to starting the car. The 1994 through 1996 models of the Jetta had some electrical issues causing the car not to start and shorting to occur in some of the electrical devices due to a non existent plastic V underneath the windshield, which was added in later models to divert rain water flowing to the electrical box. The catastrophe of this glitch can be avoided by removing leaves and debris that have accumulated below the windshield and by installing adhesive weather sealant linings underneath the plastic cover directly onto the windshield.

Another major complaint was that the North American TDI model was not rated to tow a trailer, which, according to the owner's manual, is "for technical reasons." Contrary to the American market, The European TDI model, which has an identical power train and chassis, was rated to tow a trailer according to the owner's manual. Many North American TDI owners speculated that Volkswagen decided not to risk liability issues on the American market, and some owners disregarded the owner's manual and installed hitches on their vehicles. Owners argue that the diesel engine delivers superior towing performance compared to a gasoline engine.

== Specifications ==
Model	Years	Engine and code		Displ.	Power	Torque
1.6	1992–1994	I4 8V	ABU	1,598 cc (97.5 cu in)	55 kW (74 hp; 75 PS) @ 5,200 rpm	126 N⋅m (93 lb⋅ft) @ 2,600 rpm
1.6	1994–1995	I4 8V	AEA	1,598 cc (97.5 cu in)	55 kW (74 hp; 75 PS) @ 5,200 rpm	128 N⋅m (94 lb⋅ft) @ 2,800 rpm
1.6	1995–1997	I4 8V	AEE	1,598 cc (97.5 cu in)	55 kW (74 hp; 75 PS) @ 4,800 rpm	135 N⋅m (100 lb⋅ft) @ 2,800–3,600 rpm
1.6	1994–1995	I4 8V	AEK	1,595 cc (97.3 cu in)	74 kW (99 hp; 101 PS) @ 5,800 rpm	135 N⋅m (100 lb⋅ft) @ 4,400 rpm
1.6	1995–1998	I4 8V	AFT	1,595 cc (97.3 cu in)	74 kW (99 hp; 101 PS) @ 5,800 rpm	140 N⋅m (103 lb⋅ft) @ 3,500 rpm
1.8	1992–1998	I4 8V	AAM	1,781 cc (108.7 cu in)	55 kW (74 hp; 75 PS) @ 5,000 rpm	140 N⋅m (103 lb⋅ft) @ 2,500 rpm
1.8	1992–1998	I4 8V	ABS/ADZ/ADD	1,781 cc (108.7 cu in)	66 kW (89 hp; 90 PS) @ 5,500 rpm	145 N⋅m (107 lb⋅ft) @ 2,500 rpm
2.0	1992–1995	I4 8V	2E/ADY/ABA	1,984 cc (121.1 cu in)	85 kW (114 hp; 116 PS) @ 5,400 rpm	166 N⋅m (122 lb⋅ft) @ 3,200 rpm
2.0	1995–1998	I4 8V	AGG	1,984 cc (121.1 cu in)	85 kW (114 hp; 116 PS) @ 5,400 rpm	166 N⋅m (122 lb⋅ft) @ 2,600 rpm
2.8 VR6	1992–1998	VR6 12V	AAA	2,792 cc (170.4 cu in)	128 kW (172 hp; 174 PS) @ 5,800 rpm	235 N⋅m (173 lb⋅ft) @ 4,200 rpm
1.9 D	1992–1998	I4 8V	1Y	1,896 cc (115.7 cu in)	47 kW (63 hp; 64 PS) @ 4,400 rpm	124 N⋅m (91 lb⋅ft) @ 2,000–3,000 rpm
1.9 SDI	1995–1998	I4 8V	AEY	1,896 cc (115.7 cu in)	47 kW (63 hp; 64 PS) @ 4,200 rpm	125 N⋅m (92 lb⋅ft) @ 2,200–2,800 rpm
1.9 TD	1992–1998	I4 8V	AAZ	1,896 cc (115.7 cu in)	55 kW (74 hp; 75 PS) @ 4,200 rpm	150 N⋅m (111 lb⋅ft) @ 2,400–3,400 rpm
1.9 TDI	1993–1998	I4 8V	1Z/AHU	1,896 cc (115.7 cu in)	66 kW (89 hp; 90 PS) @ 4,000 rpm	202 N⋅m (149 lb⋅ft) @ 1,900 rpm
1.9 TDI	1996–1998	I4 8V	AFN	1,896 cc (115.7 cu in)	81 kW (109 hp; 110 PS) @ 4,150 rpm	235 N⋅m (173 lb⋅ft) @ 1,900 rpm

== See also ==
- Volkswagen A platform
- Volkswagen Jetta
- Volkswagen Golf Mk3
- list of discontinued Volkswagen Group petrol engines
- list of discontinued Volkswagen Group diesel engines
- Small family car
