= Amato Ferrari =

Italian racing driver (born 1966)

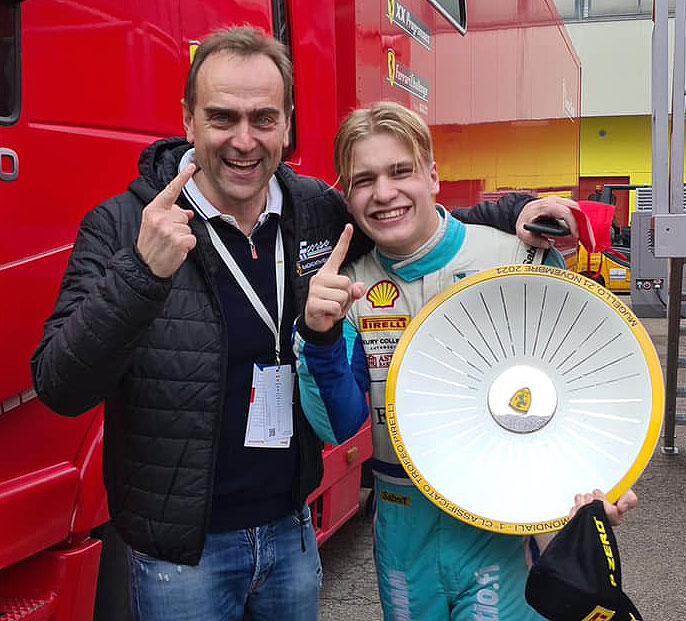
- Ferrari (left) with Luka Nurmi in 2021
- Nationality: (Italy) Italian
- Born: 18 April 1966 (age 60) Piacenza, Italy

Previous series
- 1993–94 1990 1988: Italian Superturismo Championship; British Touring Car Championship; Formula Alfa Boxer

Championship titles
- 1993: Italian Superturismo Championship – Privateers' Trophy

Amato Ferrari (born 18 April 1966) is an Italian former racing driver and team owner of AF Corse.

After competing in touring car events in Italy and Great Britain, Ferrari retired from racing in 1994 at the age of 28 and transitioned into a management role, founding his own team AF Corse. As its owner and team principal, he has achieved numerous regional and international championships, including the FIA GT Championship and FIA World Endurance Championship, as well as multiple class and overall wins at the 24 Hours of Le Mans.

Though he shares the same surname and has been associated with Ferrari for much of his managerial career, he is not related to the family of Enzo Ferrari or the company.

== Racing record ==
=== Complete British Touring Car Championship results ===
(key) (Races in bold indicate pole position in class) (Races in italics indicate fastest lap in class)

Year	Team	Car	Class	1	2	3	4	5	6	7	8	9	10	11	12	13	Overall Pos	Pts	Class Pos
1990	Crypton Engineering	Ford Sierra RS500	A	OUL	DON	THR	SIL	OUL	SIL	BRH	SNE	BRH; Ret	BIR ovr:5 cls:5	DON	THR	SIL	28th	8	12th

=== Complete Italian Superturismo Championship results ===
(key) (Races in bold indicate pole position) (Races in italics indicate fastest lap)

Year	Team	Car	1	2	3	4	5	6	7	8	9	10	11	12	13	14	15	16	17	18	19	20	DC	Pts
1993	Peugeot Junior Team	Peugeot 405	MNZ; 1; 7	MNZ; 2; 6	VAL; 1; 6	VAL; 2; 14	MIS; 1; 3	MIS; 2; 4	MAG; 1; 7	MAG; 2; 7	BIN; 1; 8	BIN; 2 Ret	IMO; 1; 18	IMO; 2; 6	VAR; 1 Ret	VAR; 2 Ret	MIS; 1; 11	MIS; 2; 6	PER; 1; 13	PER; 2 Ret	MUG; 1; 17	MUG; 2; 6	8th	70
1994	Peugeot Talbot Sport	Peugeot 405	MNZ; 1 Ret	MNZ; 2; 13	VAL; 1; 5	VAL; 2; 13	MAG; 1 Ret	MAG; 2; 10	BIN; 1; 9	BIN; 2; 7	MIS; 1; 15	MIS; 2; 7	VAL; 1; 10	VAL; 2; 12	MUG; 1; 12	MUG; 2; 9	PER; 1; 9	PER; 2 Ret	VAR; 1; 6	VAR; 2 Ret	MUG; 1; 7	MUG; 2 Ret	13th	34
