= 1995 Italian Superturismo Championship =

Seasons
- ← 1994 1996 →

The 1995 Italian Superturismo Championship was the ninth edition of the Italian Superturismo Championship. The season began in Misano on 23 April and finished in Vallelunga on 8 October, after ten rounds. Emanuele Pirro won the championship, driving an Audi A4 Quattro; the German manufacturer won the constructors' championship, while Mauro Trione won the privateers' trophy.

== Teams and drivers ==
Team	Car	No.	Drivers	Rounds	Class
(Italy) Audi Sport Italia	Audi A4 Quattro	1	(Italy) Emanuele Pirro	All	
(Italy) Audi Sport Italia	Audi A4 Quattro	2	(Italy) Rinaldo Capello	All	
(Italy) Nordauto Engineering	Alfa Romeo 155 TS	3	(Italy) Antonio Tamburini	All	
(Italy) Nordauto Engineering	Alfa Romeo 155 TS	4	(Italy) Fabrizio Giovanardi	All	
(Italy) Alfa Corse	Alfa Romeo 155 TS	5	(Italy) Gabriele Tarquini	1–6	
(Italy) Jolly Club	Alfa Romeo 155 TS	6	(Argentina) Oscar Larrauri	1–9	
(Italy) CiBiEmme Engineering	BMW 318i	7	(Italy) Emanuele Naspetti	All	
(Italy) CiBiEmme Engineering	BMW 318i	8	(Switzerland) Yolanda Surer	All	
(Italy) CiBiEmme Engineering	BMW 318i	9	(Italy) Gianni Morbidelli	All	
(Italy) RC Motorsport	Opel Vectra Gt	11	(Italy) Roberto Colciago	All	
(Italy) Audi Sport Italia	Audi A4 Quattro	12	(Italy) Tamara Vidali	9	*
(United Kingdom) Williams Renault Dealer Racing	Renault Laguna	14	(Switzerland) Alain Menu	10	*
(United Kingdom) Williams Renault Dealer Racing	Renault Laguna	15	(United Kingdom) Will Hoy	10	*
(Italy) Soli Racing	Alfa Romeo 155 TS	51	(Italy) Moreno Soli	All	P
(Italy) Vicenza Motori	Peugeot 405	52	(Italy) Massimo Pigoli	2–6, 9	P
(Italy) Tecnica Racing	Alfa Romeo 155 TS	52	(Italy) Massimo Pigoli	1	P
(Italy) Tecnica Racing	Alfa Romeo 155 TS	52	(Italy) Giovanni Ognio	7	P
(Italy) Vicenza Motori	Peugeot 405	53	(Italy) Raffaele di Bari	1, 4	P
(Italy) Tecnica Racing	Alfa Romeo 155 TS	54	(Italy) Danilo Mozzi	3–10	P
(Italy) Tecnica Racing	Alfa Romeo 155 TS	55	(Italy) Felice Tedeschi	1–5, 10	P
(Italy) Tecno Racing	BMW 318i	56	(Italy) Maurizio Lusuardi	1–4, 6–7, 9	P
(Italy) Tecno Racing	Peugeot 405	57	(Italy) Emilio Arbizzi	1–4	P
(Italy) Auto Sport Racing	BMW 318i	58	(Italy) Rocco Peduzzi	6	P
(Italy) Top Run	Alfa Romeo 155 TS	59	(Italy) Gianluca Roda	1–9	P
(Italy) Challenge Sport	Alfa Romeo 155 TS	62	(Italy) Paolo Delle Piane	All	P
(Italy) Challenge Sport	Alfa Romeo 155 TS	63	(Italy) Fabian Peroni	1	P
(Italy) Challenge Sport	Alfa Romeo 155 TS	63	(Italy) Gherardo Cazzago	3, 5–10	P
(Italy) Tecno Racing	Peugeot 405	64	(Italy) Stefano Gabellini	1	P
(Italy) Piemme Motors	Peugeot 405	65	(Italy) Mauro Trione	All	P
(Italy) Vicenza Motori	Peugeot 405	66	(Italy) Claudio Melotto	3, 5	P
(Italy) Tecnica Racing	Alfa Romeo 155 TS	68	(Italy) Giovanni Ognio	8–9	P
(Italy) Ciemme	Opel Vectra	68	(Italy) Giovanni Ognio	4–5	P
(Italy) Ciemme	Opel Vectra	69	(Italy) Luigi Cevasco	6	P
(Italy) Vicenza Motori	Peugeot 405	81	(Italy) Guido Lucchetti Cigarini	6	P
(Italy) Vicenza Motori	Peugeot 405	82	(Switzerland) Felipe Ortiz	8	P
(Italy) Vicenza Motori	Peugeot 405	83	(Italy) Mariano Bellin	8	P
(Italy) Tecno Racing	Peugeot 405	83	(Italy) Gianfranco Pindari	9	P
(Italy) Italtecnica Racing	Peugeot 405	85	(Italy) Raffaele Fortunato	9–10	P
(Italy) Top Run	Alfa Romeo 155 TS	88	(Italy) Raffaele Fortunato	7	P

Icon	Class
*	Not eligible to score championship points
P	Private Drivers

=== Drivers changes ===
Changed Cars

- Fabrizio Giovanardi: Peugeot 405 → Alfa Romeo 155

Entering Superturismo 1995

- Gabriele Tarquini: BTCC → Alfa Romeo 155
- Oscar Larrauri: No full-time drive → Alfa Romeo 155
- Yolanda Surer: STW → BMW 318iS
- Gianni Morbidelli: F1 → BMW 318iS
- Roberto Colciago: F3 → Opel Vectra Gt

Leaving Superturismo 1995

- Roberto Ravaglia: → STW
- Gary Ayles: → BPR GT
- Tamara Vidali: → STW
- Johnny Cecotto: → BTCC
- Alexander Burgstaller: → STW
- Stefano Modena: → DTM/ITC
- Marco Brand: → CIVT
- Enrico Bertaggia: → STW
- Amato Ferrari: → Retired

== Race calendar and results ==
Round		Circuit	Date	Pole position	Fastest lap	Winning driver	Winning team
1	R1	(Italy) Circuito Internazionale Misano	23 April	(Italy) Emanuele Pirro	(Italy) Emanuele Pirro	(Italy) Gabriele Tarquini	(Italy) Alfa Corse
1	R2	(Italy) Circuito Internazionale Misano	23 April		(Italy) Emanuele Pirro	(Italy) Emanuele Pirro	(Italy) Audi Sport Italia
2	R1	(Italy) Autodromo del Levante	7 May	(Italy) Rinaldo Capello	(Italy) Emanuele Pirro	(Italy) Emanuele Pirro	(Italy) Audi Sport Italia
2	R2	(Italy) Autodromo del Levante	7 May		(Italy) Emanuele Pirro	(Italy) Emanuele Pirro	(Italy) Audi Sport Italia
3	R1	(Italy) Autodromo Nazionale Monza	21 May	(Italy) Gabriele Tarquini	(Italy) Fabrizio Giovanardi	(Italy) Emanuele Pirro	(Italy) Audi Sport Italia
3	R2	(Italy) Autodromo Nazionale Monza	21 May		(Italy) Gabriele Tarquini	(Italy) Roberto Colciago	(Italy) RC Motorsport
4	R1	(Italy) Autodromo Enzo e Dino Ferrari	4 June	(Italy) Rinaldo Capello	(Italy) Gabriele Tarquini	(Italy) Emanuele Pirro	(Italy) Audi Sport Italia
4	R2	(Italy) Autodromo Enzo e Dino Ferrari	4 June		(Italy) Emanuele Pirro	(Italy) Emanuele Pirro	(Italy) Audi Sport Italia
5	R1	(Italy) Autodromo di Magione	18 June	(Italy) Emanuele Pirro	(Italy) Emanuele Pirro	(Italy) Emanuele Pirro	(Italy) Audi Sport Italia
5	R2	(Italy) Autodromo di Magione	18 June		(Italy) Emanuele Pirro	(Italy) Rinaldo Capello	(Italy) Audi Sport Italia
6	R1	(Italy) Autodromo Internazionale del Mugello	9 July	(Italy) Gabriele Tarquini	(Italy) Gabriele Tarquini	(Italy) Fabrizio Giovanardi	(Italy) Nordauto Engineering
6	R2	(Italy) Autodromo Internazionale del Mugello	9 July		(Italy) Gabriele Tarquini	(Italy) Gabriele Tarquini	(Italy) Alfa Corse
7	R1	(Italy) Circuito Internazionale Misano	6 August	(Italy) Gianni Morbidelli	(Italy) Emanuele Pirro	(Italy) Emanuele Pirro	(Italy) Audi Sport Italia
7	R2	(Italy) Circuito Internazionale Misano	6 August		(Italy) Gianni Morbidelli	(Italy) Emanuele Pirro	(Italy) Audi Sport Italia
8	R1	(Italy) Autodromo di Pergusa	3 September	(Italy) Gianni Morbidelli	(Italy) Gianni Morbidelli	(Italy) Gianni Morbidelli	(Italy) CiBiEmme Engineering
8	R2	(Italy) Autodromo di Pergusa	3 September		(Italy) Fabrizio Giovanardi	(Italy) Gianni Morbidelli	(Italy) CiBiEmme Engineering
9	R1	(Italy) Autodromo Riccardo Paletti di Varano	17 September	(Italy) Rinaldo Capello	(Italy) Emanuele Pirro	(Italy) Rinaldo Capello	(Italy) Audi Sport Italia
9	R2	(Italy) Autodromo Riccardo Paletti di Varano	17 September		(Italy) Emanuele Pirro	(Italy) Emanuele Pirro	(Italy) Audi Sport Italia
10	R1	(Italy) ACI Vallelunga Circuit	8 October	(Italy) Emanuele Pirro	(Italy) Emanuele Pirro	(Italy) Emanuele Pirro	(Italy) Audi Sport Italia
10	R2	(Italy) ACI Vallelunga Circuit	8 October		(Italy) Emanuele Pirro	(Italy) Rinaldo Capello	(Italy) Audi Sport Italia

== Round 1 (Italy) Misano Adriatico ==
Qualifying

Pos	No	Driver	Car	Lap Time	Top Qualifying
1	1	(Italy) Emanuele Pirro	Audi A4 Quattro	1.37.100	TQ
2	5	(Italy) Gabriele Tarquini	Alfa Romeo 155	1.37.846	TQ
3	7	(Italy) Emanuele Naspetti	BMW 318iS	1.38.428	TQ
4	9	(Italy) Gianni Morbidelli	BMW 318iS	1.38.477	TQ
5	11	(Italy) Roberto Colciago	Opel Vectra GT	1.39.725	TQ
6	52	(Italy) Massimo Pigoli	Alfa Romeo 155	1.40.631	TQ
7	2	(Italy) Rinaldo Capello	Audi A4 Quattro	time disallowed	TQ
8	4	(Italy) Fabrizio Giovanardi	Alfa Romeo 155	time disallowed	TQ
9	3	(Italy) Antonio Tamburini	Alfa Romeo 155	time disallowed	TQ
10	6	(Argentina) Oscar Larrauri	Alfa Romeo 155	time disallowed	TQ
11	55	(Italy) Felice Tedeschi	Alfa Romeo 155	1.40.875	Top Private Qual
12	8	(Switzerland) Yolanda Surer	BMW 318iS	1.39.482	
13	51	(Italy) Moreno Soli	Alfa Romeo 155	1.40.880	Top Private Qual
14	65	(Italy) Mauro Trione	Peugeot 405	time disallowed	Top Private Qual
15	59	(Italy) Gianluca Roda	Alfa Romeo 155	time disallowed	Top Private Qual
16	62	(Italy) Paolo Delle Piane	Alfa Romeo 155	1.40.555	
17	63	(Italy) Fabian Peroni	Alfa Romeo 155	1.41.050	
18	56	(Italy) Maurizio Lusuardi	BMW 318iS	1.42.273	
19	53	(Italy) Raffaele Di Bari	Peugeot 405	1.43.475	
20	64	(Italy) Stefano Gabellini	Peugeot 405	1.44.432	
21	57	(Italy) Emilio Arbizzi	Peugeot 405	1.48.204	

Race 1

Pos	No	Driver	Constructor	Time/Retired	Points
1	5	(Italy) Gabriele Tarquini	Alfa Romeo 155	18 laps in 29:45.322	20
2	1	(Italy) Emanuele Pirro	Audi A4 Quattro	+0.528s	15
3	2	(Italy) Rinaldo Capello	Audi A4 Quattro	+3.515s	12
4	3	(Italy) Antonio Tamburini	Alfa Romeo 155	+12.847s	10
5	7	(Italy) Emanuele Naspetti	BMW 318iS	+15.020s	8
6	11	(Italy) Roberto Colciago	Opel Vectra GT	+30.353s	6
7	6	(Argentina) Oscar Larrauri	Alfa Romeo 155	+47.522s	4
8	8	(Switzerland) Yolanda Surer	BMW 318iS	+49.103s	3
9	52	(Italy) Massimo Pigoli	Alfa Romeo 155	+49.383s	2
10	65	(Italy) Mauro Trione	Peugeot 405	+58.005s	1
11	59	(Italy) Gianluca Roda	Alfa Romeo 155	+1.21.663s	
12	63	(Italy) Fabian Peroni	Alfa Romeo 155	+1.21.991s	
13	51	(Italy) Moreno Soli	Alfa Romeo 155	+1.34.131s	
14	56	(Italy) Maurizio Lusuardi	BMW 318iS	+1 lap	
15	64	(Italy) Stefano Gabellini	Peugeot 405	+1 lap	
16	53	(Italy) Raffaele Di Bari	Peugeot 405	+1 lap	
17	57	(Italy) Emilio Arbizzi	Peugeot 405	+2 laps	
DNF	4	(Italy) Fabrizio Giovanardi	Alfa Romeo 155	+14 laps	
DNF	55	(Italy) Felice Tedeschi	Alfa Romeo 155	+18 laps	
DNF	9	(Italy) Gianni Morbidelli	BMW 318iS	+18 laps	
DNS	62	(Italy) Paolo Delle Piane	Alfa Romeo 155		

Race 2

Pos	No	Driver	Constructor	Time/Retired	Points
1	1	(Italy) Emanuele Pirro	Audi A4 Quattro	18 laps in 29:48.186	20
2	2	(Italy) Rinaldo Capello	Audi A4 Quattro	+2.472s	15
3	3	(Italy) Antonio Tamburini	Alfa Romeo 155	+3.975s	12
4	7	(Italy) Emanuele Naspetti	BMW 318iS	+8.922s	10
5	4	(Italy) Fabrizio Giovanardi	Alfa Romeo 155	+9.701s	8
6	9	(Italy) Gianni Morbidelli	BMW 318iS	+23.811s	6
7	6	(Argentina) Oscar Larrauri	Alfa Romeo 155	+43.965s	4
8	52	(Italy) Massimo Pigoli	Alfa Romeo 155	+47.680s	3
9	55	(Italy) Felice Tedeschi	Alfa Romeo 155	+52.128s	2
10	56	(Italy) Maurizio Lusuardi	BMW 318iS	+1.22.551s	1
11	57	(Italy) Emilio Arbizzi	Peugeot 405	+1 lap	
DNF	11	(Italy) Roberto Colciago	Opel Vectra GT	+2 laps	
DNF	53	(Italy) Raffaele Di Bari	Peugeot 405	+3 laps	
DNF	51	(Italy) Moreno Soli	Alfa Romeo 155	+4 laps	
DNF	63	(Italy) Fabian Peroni	Alfa Romeo 155	+9 laps	
DNF	5	(Italy) Gabriele Tarquini	Alfa Romeo 155	+16 laps	
DNF	59	(Italy) Gianluca Roda	Alfa Romeo 155	+16 laps	
DNF	65	(Italy) Mauro Trione	Peugeot 405	+18 laps	
DNF	64	(Italy) Stefano Gabellini	Peugeot 405	+18 laps	
DNS	8	(Switzerland) Yolanda Surer	BMW 318iS		
DNS	62	(Italy) Paolo Delle Piane	Alfa Romeo 155		

=== Championship standings after Round 1 ===
Drivers' Championship standings

Pos	Driver	Points
1	(Italy) Emanuele Pirro	35
2	(Italy) Rinaldo Capello	27
3	(Italy) Antonio Tamburini	22
4	(Italy) Gabriele Tarquini	20
5	(Italy) Emanuele Naspetti	18

Constructors' Championship standings

Pos	Constructor	Points
1	(Germany) Audi	35
2	(Italy) Alfa Romeo	32
3	(Germany) BMW	18
4	(Germany) Opel	6

== Round 2 (Italy) Binetto ==
Qualifying

Pos	No	Driver	Car	Lap Time	Top Qualifying
1	2	(Italy) Rinaldo Capello	Audi A4 Quattro	47.942	TQ
1	1	(Italy) Emanuele Pirro	Audi A4 Quattro	48.003	TQ
3	3	(Italy) Antonio Tamburini	Alfa Romeo 155	48.695	TQ
4	4	(Italy) Fabrizio Giovanardi	Alfa Romeo 155	48.704	TQ
5	5	(Italy) Gabriele Tarquini	Alfa Romeo 155	48.844	TQ
6	9	(Italy) Gianni Morbidelli	BMW 318iS	49.113	TQ
7	7	(Italy) Emanuele Naspetti	BMW 318iS	49.220	TQ
8	11	(Italy) Roberto Colciago	Opel Vectra GT	49.880	TQ
9	6	(Argentina) Oscar Larrauri	Alfa Romeo 155	50.064	TQ
10	65	(Italy) Mauro Trione	Peugeot 405	50.886	TQ
11	8	(Switzerland) Yolanda Surer	BMW 318iS	49.681	
12	55	(Italy) Felice Tedeschi	Alfa Romeo 155	50.240	Top Private Qual
13	51	(Italy) Moreno Soli	Alfa Romeo 155	50.510	Top Private Qual
14	62	(Italy) Paolo Delle Piane	Alfa Romeo 155	50.529	Top Private Qual
15	52	(Italy) Massimo Pigoli	Peugeot 405	51.365	Top Private Qual
16	59	(Italy) Gianluca Roda	Alfa Romeo 155	51.049	
17	56	(Italy) Maurizio Lusuardi	BMW 318iS	51.368	
18	57	(Italy) Emilio Arbizzi	Peugeot 405	52.109	

Race 1

Pos	No	Driver	Constructor	Time/Retired	Points
1	1	(Italy) Emanuele Pirro	Audi A4 Quattro	34 laps in 28:21.063	20
2	2	(Italy) Rinaldo Capello	Audi A4 Quattro	+2.959s	15
3	5	(Italy) Gabriele Tarquini	Alfa Romeo 155	+5.579s	12
4	4	(Italy) Fabrizio Giovanardi	Alfa Romeo 155	+14.077s	10
5	7	(Italy) Emanuele Naspetti	BMW 318iS	+14.810s	8
6	9	(Italy) Gianni Morbidelli	BMW 318iS	+22.236s	6
7	11	(Italy) Roberto Colciago	Opel Vectra GT	+28.657s	4
8	6	(Argentina) Oscar Larrauri	Alfa Romeo 155	+38.712s	3
9	65	(Italy) Mauro Trione	Peugeot 405	+1 lap	2
10	51	(Italy) Moreno Soli	Alfa Romeo 155	+1 lap	1
11	62	(Italy) Paolo Delle Piane	Alfa Romeo 155	+1 lap	
12	59	(Italy) Gianluca Roda	Alfa Romeo 155	+2 laps	
13	56	(Italy) Maurizio Lusuardi	BMW 318iS	+2 laps	
14	52	(Italy) Massimo Pigoli	Peugeot 405	+3 laps	
15	57	(Italy) Emilio Arbizzi	Peugeot 405	+3 laps	
DNF	8	(Switzerland) Yolanda Surer	BMW 318iS	+4 laps	
DNF	3	(Italy) Antonio Tamburini	Alfa Romeo 155	+8 laps	
DNF	55	(Italy) Felice Tedeschi	Alfa Romeo 155	+33 laps	

Race 2

Pos	No	Driver	Constructor	Time/Retired	Points
1	1	(Italy) Emanuele Pirro	Audi A4 Quattro	34 laps in 28:17.210	20
2	2	(Italy) Rinaldo Capello	Audi A4 Quattro	+7.033s	15
3	5	(Italy) Gabriele Tarquini	Alfa Romeo 155	+14.942s	12
4	4	(Italy) Fabrizio Giovanardi	Alfa Romeo 155	+21.056s	10
5	7	(Italy) Emanuele Naspetti	BMW 318iS	+29.697s	8
6	3	(Italy) Antonio Tamburini	Alfa Romeo 155	+30.213s	6
7	9	(Italy) Gianni Morbidelli	BMW 318iS	+36.943s	4
8	6	(Argentina) Oscar Larrauri	Alfa Romeo 155	+ lap	3
9	65	(Italy) Mauro Trione	Peugeot 405	+1 lap	2
10	8	(Switzerland) Yolanda Surer	BMW 318iS	+1 lap	1
11	62	(Italy) Paolo Delle Piane	Alfa Romeo 155	+1 lap	
12	55	(Italy) Felice Tedeschi	Alfa Romeo 155	+1 lap	
13	52	(Italy) Massimo Pigoli	Peugeot 405	+1 lap	
14	51	(Italy) Moreno Soli	Alfa Romeo 155	+2 laps	
15	57	(Italy) Emilio Arbizzi	Peugeot 405	+3 laps	
DNF	59	(Italy) Gianluca Roda	Alfa Romeo 155	+13 laps	
DNF	56	(Italy) Maurizio Lusuardi	BMW 318iS	+18 laps	
DNF	11	(Italy) Roberto Colciago	Opel Vectra GT	+24 laps	

=== Championship standings after Round 2 ===
Drivers' Championship standings

Pos	Driver	Points
1	(Italy) Emanuele Pirro	75
2	(Italy) Rinaldo Capello	57
3	(Italy) Gabriele Tarquini	44
4	(Italy) Emanuele Naspetti	34
5	(Italy) Antonio Tamburini	28

Constructors' Championship standings

Pos	Constructor	Points
1	(Germany) Audi	75
2	(Italy) Alfa Romeo	56
3	(Germany) BMW	34
4	(Germany) Opel	10

== Round 3 (Italy) Monza ==
Qualifying

Pos	No	Driver	Car	Lap Time	Top Qualifying
1	5	(Italy) Gabriele Tarquini	Alfa Romeo 155	1.56.610	TQ
2	1	(Italy) Emanuele Pirro	Audi A4 Quattro	1.56.882	TQ
3	2	(Italy) Rinaldo Capello	Audi A4 Quattro	1.57.255	TQ
4	11	(Italy) Roberto Colciago	Opel Vectra GT	1.57.423	TQ
5	9	(Italy) Gianni Morbidelli	BMW 318iS	1.57.743	TQ
6	3	(Italy) Antonio Tamburini	Alfa Romeo 155	1.57.842	TQ
7	6	(Argentina) Oscar Larrauri	Alfa Romeo 155	1.59.061	TQ
8	63	(Italy) Gherardo Cazzago	Alfa Romeo 155	2.00.419	TQ
9	4	(Italy) Fabrizio Giovanardi	Alfa Romeo 155	2.25.091	TQ
10	7	(Italy) Emanuele Naspetti	BMW 318iS	no time	TQ
11	65	(Italy) Mauro Trione	Peugeot 405	2.00.675	Top Private Qual
12	52	(Italy) Massimo Pigoli	Peugeot 405	2.01.100	Top Private Qual
13	54	(Italy) Danilo Mozzi	Alfa Romeo 155	2.01.188	Top Private Qual
14	8	(Switzerland) Yolanda Surer	BMW 318iS	2.00.790	
15	55	(Italy) Felice Tedeschi	Alfa Romeo 155	2.01.355	Top Private Qual
16	62	(Italy) Paolo Delle Piane	Alfa Romeo 155	2.01.276	
17	59	(Italy) Gianluca Roda	Alfa Romeo 155	2.01.667	
18	51	(Italy) Moreno Soli	Alfa Romeo 155	2.02.722	
19	56	(Italy) Maurizio Lusuardi	BMW 318iS	2.03.028	
20	66	(Italy) Claudio Melotto	Peugeot 405	2.04.224	
21	57	(Italy) Emilio Arbizzi	Peugeot 405	2.06.257	

Race 1

Pos	No	Driver	Constructor	Time/Retired	Points
1	1	(Italy) Emanuele Pirro	Audi A4 Quattro	15 laps in 29:44.521	20
2	11	(Italy) Roberto Colciago	Opel Vectra GT	+3.281s	15
3	3	(Italy) Antonio Tamburini	Alfa Romeo 155	+5.274s	12
4	2	(Italy) Rinaldo Capello	Audi A4 Quattro	+15.936s	10
5	9	(Italy) Gianni Morbidelli	BMW 318iS	+16.231s	8
6	4	(Italy) Fabrizio Giovanardi	Alfa Romeo 155	+16.644s	6
7	7	(Italy) Emanuele Naspetti	BMW 318iS	+36.879s	4
8	63	(Italy) Gherardo Cazzago	Alfa Romeo 155	+47.385s	3
9	55	(Italy) Felice Tedeschi	Alfa Romeo 155	+53.876s	2
10	54	(Italy) Danilo Mozzi	Alfa Romeo 155	+1.07.542s	1
11	8	(Switzerland) Yolanda Surer	BMW 318iS	+1.09.854s	
12	51	(Italy) Moreno Soli	Alfa Romeo 155	+1.14.233s	
13	52	(Italy) Massimo Pigoli	Peugeot 405	+1.23.980s	
14	62	(Italy) Paolo Delle Piane	Alfa Romeo 155	+1.43.287s	
15	59	(Italy) Gianluca Roda	Alfa Romeo 155	+1.51.859s	
16	56	(Italy) Maurizio Lusuardi	BMW 318iS	+1.53.995s	
17	65	(Italy) Mauro Trione	Peugeot 405	+1 lap	
18	57	(Italy) Emilio Arbizzi	Peugeot 405	+1 lap	
DNF	6	(Argentina) Oscar Larrauri	Alfa Romeo 155	+5 laps	
DNF	5	(Italy) Gabriele Tarquini	Alfa Romeo 155	+8 laps	
DNF	66	(Italy) Claudio Melotto	Peugeot 405	+10 laps	

Race 2

Pos	No	Driver	Constructor	Time/Retired	Points
1	11	(Italy) Roberto Colciago	Opel Vectra GT	15 laps in 29:39.803	20
2	1	(Italy) Emanuele Pirro	Audi A4 Quattro	+0.859s	15
3	2	(Italy) Rinaldo Capello	Audi A4 Quattro	+9.803s	12
4	9	(Italy) Gianni Morbidelli	BMW 318iS	+25.263s	10
5	3	(Italy) Antonio Tamburini	Alfa Romeo 155	+29.116s	8
6	62	(Italy) Paolo Delle Piane	Alfa Romeo 155	+48.516s	6
7	55	(Italy) Felice Tedeschi	Alfa Romeo 155	+55.373s	4
8	8	(Switzerland) Yolanda Surer	BMW 318iS	+59.090s	3
9	65	(Italy) Mauro Trione	Peugeot 405	+1.02.025s	2
10	51	(Italy) Moreno Soli	Alfa Romeo 155	+1.03.278s	1
11	59	(Italy) Gianluca Roda	Alfa Romeo 155	+1.15.144s	
12	56	(Italy) Maurizio Lusuardi	BMW 318iS	+1.42.823s	
13	54	(Italy) Danilo Mozzi	Alfa Romeo 155	+1.43.027s	
14	4	(Italy) Fabrizio Giovanardi	Alfa Romeo 155	+1.44.689s	
15	57	(Italy) Emilio Arbizzi	Peugeot 405	+1 lap	
DNF	5	(Italy) Gabriele Tarquini	Alfa Romeo 155	+7 laps	
DNF	6	(Argentina) Oscar Larrauri	Alfa Romeo 155	+8 laps	
DNF	7	(Italy) Emanuele Naspetti	BMW 318iS	+13 laps	
DNF	66	(Italy) Claudio Melotto	Peugeot 405	+13 laps	
DNF	63	(Italy) Gherardo Cazzago	Alfa Romeo 155	+15 laps	
DSQ	52	(Italy) Massimo Pigoli	Peugeot 405	+13 laps	

=== Championship standings after Round 3 ===
Drivers' Championship standings

Pos	Driver	Points
1	(Italy) Emanuele Pirro	110
2	(Italy) Rinaldo Capello	79
3	(Italy) Antonio Tamburini	48
4	(Italy) Roberto Colciago	45
5	(Italy) Gabriele Tarquini	44

Constructors' Championship standings

Pos	Constructor	Points
1	(Germany) Audi	110
2	(Italy) Alfa Romeo	76
3	(Germany) BMW	52
4	(Germany) Opel	45

== Round 4 (Italy) Imola ==
Qualifying

Pos	No	Driver	Car	Lap Time	Top Qualifying
1	2	(Italy) Rinaldo Capello	Audi A4 Quattro	1.59.998	TQ
2	5	(Italy) Gabriele Tarquini	Alfa Romeo 155	2.00.046	TQ
3	1	(Italy) Emanuele Pirro	Audi A4 Quattro	2.00.234	TQ
4	4	(Italy) Fabrizio Giovanardi	Alfa Romeo 155	2.00.995	TQ
5	9	(Italy) Gianni Morbidelli	BMW 318iS	2.01.135	TQ
6	3	(Italy) Antonio Tamburini	Alfa Romeo 155	2.01.218	TQ
7	11	(Italy) Roberto Colciago	Opel Vectra GT	2.01.274	TQ
8	7	(Italy) Emanuele Naspetti	BMW 318iS	2.01.361	TQ
9	6	(Argentina) Oscar Larrauri	Alfa Romeo 155	2.02.255	TQ
10	55	(Italy) Felice Tedeschi	Alfa Romeo 155	2.04.332	TQ
11	52	(Italy) Massimo Pigoli	Peugeot 405	2.04.326	Top Private Qual
12	8	(Switzerland) Yolanda Surer	BMW 318iS	2.02.941	
13	62	(Italy) Paolo Delle Piane	Alfa Romeo 155	2.05.019	Top Private Qual
14	59	(Italy) Gianluca Roda	Alfa Romeo 155	2.05.684	Top Private Qual
15	51	(Italy) Moreno Soli	Alfa Romeo 155	2.05.727	Top Private Qual
16	65	(Italy) Mauro Trione	Peugeot 405	2.05.037	
17	54	(Italy) Danilo Mozzi	Alfa Romeo 155	2.05.096	
18	56	(Italy) Maurizio Lusuardi	BMW 318iS	2.07.548	
19	57	(Italy) Emilio Arbizzi	Peugeot 405	2.09.498	
20	68	(Italy) Giovanni Ognio	Opel Vectra GT	2.14.115	
21	53	(Italy) Raffaele Di Bari	Peugeot 405	no time	

Race 1

Pos	No	Driver	Constructor	Time/Retired	Points
1	1	(Italy) Emanuele Pirro	Audi A4 Quattro	16 laps in 32:37.975	20
2	2	(Italy) Rinaldo Capello	Audi A4 Quattro	+0.590s	15
3	5	(Italy) Gabriele Tarquini	Alfa Romeo 155	+6.500s	12
4	3	(Italy) Antonio Tamburini	Alfa Romeo 155	+7.901s	10
5	4	(Italy) Fabrizio Giovanardi	Alfa Romeo 155	+8.204s	8
6	7	(Italy) Emanuele Naspetti	BMW 318iS	+13.903s	6
7	9	(Italy) Gianni Morbidelli	BMW 318iS	+15.428s	4
8	11	(Italy) Roberto Colciago	Opel Vectra GT	+47.399s	3
9	55	(Italy) Felice Tedeschi	Alfa Romeo 155	+1.03.303s	2
10	52	(Italy) Massimo Pigoli	Peugeot 405	+1.06.331s	1
11	51	(Italy) Moreno Soli	Alfa Romeo 155	+1.07.426s	
12	59	(Italy) Gianluca Roda	Alfa Romeo 155	+1.10.503s	
13	54	(Italy) Danilo Mozzi	Alfa Romeo 155	+1.12.150s	
14	68	(Italy) Giovanni Ognio	Opel Vectra GT	+1.52.891s	
15	53	(Italy) Raffaele Di Bari	Peugeot 405	+1 lap	
16	62	(Italy) Paolo Delle Piane	Alfa Romeo 155	+2 laps	
17	8	(Switzerland) Yolanda Surer	BMW 318iS	+5 laps	
18	6	(Argentina) Oscar Larrauri	Alfa Romeo 155	+6 laps	
19	56	(Italy) Maurizio Lusuardi	BMW 318iS	+8 laps	
DNF	65	(Italy) Mauro Trione	Peugeot 405	+11 lap	
DNF	57	(Italy) Emilio Arbizzi	Peugeot 405	+16 laps	

Race 2

Pos	No	Driver	Constructor	Time/Retired	Points
1	1	(Italy) Emanuele Pirro	Audi A4 Quattro	16 laps in 36:36.354	20
2	2	(Italy) Rinaldo Capello	Audi A4 Quattro	+0.484s	15
3	5	(Italy) Gabriele Tarquini	Alfa Romeo 155	+16.742s	12
4	3	(Italy) Antonio Tamburini	Alfa Romeo 155	+33.566s	10
5	7	(Italy) Emanuele Naspetti	BMW 318iS	+1.01.992s	8
6	6	(Argentina) Oscar Larrauri	Alfa Romeo 155	+1.03.351s	6
7	11	(Italy) Roberto Colciago	Opel Vectra GT	+1.23.352s	4
8	55	(Italy) Felice Tedeschi	Alfa Romeo 155	+1.46.549s	3
9	54	(Italy) Danilo Mozzi	Alfa Romeo 155	+1.47.449s	2
10	8	(Switzerland) Yolanda Surer	BMW 318iS	+2.20.196s	1
11	52	(Italy) Massimo Pigoli	Peugeot 405	+2.20.703s	
12	53	(Italy) Raffaele Di Bari	Peugeot 405	+1 lap	
DNF	9	(Italy) Gianni Morbidelli	BMW 318iS	+7 laps	
DNF	51	(Italy) Moreno Soli	Alfa Romeo 155	+8 laps	
DNF	56	(Italy) Maurizio Lusuardi	BMW 318iS	+10 laps	
DNF	62	(Italy) Paolo Delle Piane	Alfa Romeo 155	+14 laps	
DNF	59	(Italy) Gianluca Roda	Alfa Romeo 155	+15 laps	
DNF	4	(Italy) Fabrizio Giovanardi	Alfa Romeo 155	+16 laps	
DNF	68	(Italy) Giovanni Ognio	Opel Vectra GT	+16 laps	
DNS	65	(Italy) Mauro Trione	Peugeot 405		
DNS	57	(Italy) Emilio Arbizzi	Peugeot 405	+3 laps	

=== Championship standings after Round 4 ===
Drivers' Championship standings

Pos	Driver	Points
1	(Italy) Emanuele Pirro	150
2	(Italy) Rinaldo Capello	109
3	(Italy) Gabriele Tarquini	68
4	(Italy) Antonio Tamburini	68
5	(Italy) Emanuele Naspetti	52

Constructors' Championship standings

Pos	Constructor	Points
1	(Germany) Audi	150
2	(Italy) Alfa Romeo	100
3	(Germany) BMW	66
4	(Germany) Opel	52

== Round 5 (Italy) Magione ==
Qualifying

Pos	No	Driver	Car	Lap Time	Top Qualifying
1	1	(Italy) Emanuele Pirro	Audi A4 Quattro	52.570	TQ
2	2	(Italy) Rinaldo Capello	Audi A4 Quattro	52.617	TQ
3	3	(Italy) Antonio Tamburini	Alfa Romeo 155	53.345	TQ
4	5	(Italy) Gabriele Tarquini	Alfa Romeo 155	53.354	TQ
5	7	(Italy) Emanuele Naspetti	BMW 318iS	53.442	TQ
6	9	(Italy) Gianni Morbidelli	BMW 318iS	53.456	TQ
7	4	(Italy) Fabrizio Giovanardi	Alfa Romeo 155	53.638	TQ
8	6	(Argentina) Oscar Larrauri	Alfa Romeo 155	53.645	TQ
9	63	(Italy) Gherardo Cazzago	Alfa Romeo 155	54.722	TQ
10	8	(Switzerland) Yolanda Surer	BMW 318iS	55.125	TQ
11	11	(Italy) Roberto Colciago	Opel Vectra GT	53.698	
12	62	(Italy) Paolo Delle Piane	Alfa Romeo 155	54.840	Top Private Qual
13	65	(Italy) Mauro Trione	Peugeot 405	55.003	Top Private Qual
14	51	(Italy) Moreno Soli	Alfa Romeo 155	55.129	Top Private Qual
15	55	(Italy) Felice Tedeschi	Alfa Romeo 155	57.864	Top Private Qual
16	54	(Italy) Danilo Mozzi	Alfa Romeo 155	54.923	
17	52	(Italy) Massimo Pigoli	Peugeot 405	55.100	
18	59	(Italy) Gianluca Roda	Alfa Romeo 155	55.233	
19	66	(Italy) Claudio Melotto	Peugeot 405	55.839	
20	68	(Italy) Giovanni Ognio	Opel Vectra GT	56.441	

Race 1

Pos	No	Driver	Constructor	Time/Retired	Points
1	1	(Italy) Emanuele Pirro	Audi A4 Quattro	32 laps in 28:42.908	20
2	2	(Italy) Rinaldo Capello	Audi A4 Quattro	+0.507s	15
3	7	(Italy) Emanuele Naspetti	BMW 318iS	+14.206s	12
4	3	(Italy) Antonio Tamburini	Alfa Romeo 155	+22.675s	10
5	9	(Italy) Gianni Morbidelli	BMW 318iS	+22.878s	8
6	4	(Italy) Fabrizio Giovanardi	Alfa Romeo 155	+35.469s	6
7	8	(Switzerland) Yolanda Surer	BMW 318iS	+47.456s	4
8	63	(Italy) Gherardo Cazzago	Alfa Romeo 155	+55.198s	3
9	62	(Italy) Paolo Delle Piane	Alfa Romeo 155	+1 lap	2
10	11	(Italy) Roberto Colciago	Opel Vectra GT	+1 lap	1
11	65	(Italy) Mauro Trione	Peugeot 405	+1 lap	
12	55	(Italy) Felice Tedeschi	Alfa Romeo 155	+1 lap	
13	51	(Italy) Moreno Soli	Alfa Romeo 155	+1 lap	
14	59	(Italy) Gianluca Roda	Alfa Romeo 155	+1 lap	
15	68	(Italy) Giovanni Ognio	Opel Vectra GT	+2 laps	
16	66	(Italy) Claudio Melotto	Peugeot 405	+2 laps	
17	54	(Italy) Danilo Mozzi	Alfa Romeo 155	+3 laps	
18	6	(Argentina) Oscar Larrauri	Alfa Romeo 155	+4 laps	
DNF	5	(Italy) Gabriele Tarquini	Alfa Romeo 155	+6 laps	
DNS	52	(Italy) Massimo Pigoli	Peugeot 405		

Race 2

Pos	No	Driver	Constructor	Time/Retired	Points
1	2	(Italy) Rinaldo Capello	Audi A4 Quattro	32 laps in 28:37.239	20
2	1	(Italy) Emanuele Pirro	Audi A4 Quattro	+0.527s	15
3	7	(Italy) Emanuele Naspetti	BMW 318iS	+16.325s	12
4	9	(Italy) Gianni Morbidelli	BMW 318iS	+22.454s	10
5	3	(Italy) Antonio Tamburini	Alfa Romeo 155	+36.367s	8
6	4	(Italy) Fabrizio Giovanardi	Alfa Romeo 155	+41.576s	6
7	6	(Argentina) Oscar Larrauri	Alfa Romeo 155	+52.576s	4
8	8	(Switzerland) Yolanda Surer	BMW 318iS	+1 lap	3
9	63	(Italy) Gherardo Cazzago	Alfa Romeo 155	+1 lap	2
10	62	(Italy) Paolo Delle Piane	Alfa Romeo 155	+1 lap	1
11	11	(Italy) Roberto Colciago	Opel Vectra GT	+1 lap	
12	65	(Italy) Mauro Trione	Peugeot 405	+1 lap	
13	51	(Italy) Moreno Soli	Alfa Romeo 155	+1 lap	
14	55	(Italy) Felice Tedeschi	Alfa Romeo 155	+2 laps	
15	68	(Italy) Giovanni Ognio	Opel Vectra GT	+2 laps	
16	59	(Italy) Gianluca Roda	Alfa Romeo 155	+2 laps	
17	54	(Italy) Danilo Mozzi	Alfa Romeo 155	+2 laps	
18	66	(Italy) Claudio Melotto	Peugeot 405	+3 laps	
DNF	5	(Italy) Gabriele Tarquini	Alfa Romeo 155	+19 laps	
DNS	52	(Italy) Massimo Pigoli	Peugeot 405		

=== Championship standings after Round 5 ===
Drivers' Championship standings

Pos	Driver	Points
1	(Italy) Emanuele Pirro	185
2	(Italy) Rinaldo Capello	144
3	(Italy) Antonio Tamburini	86
4	(Italy) Emanuele Naspetti	76
5	(Italy) Gabriele Tarquini	68

Constructors' Championship standings

Pos	Constructor	Points
1	(Germany) Audi	190
2	(Italy) Alfa Romeo	118
3	(Germany) BMW	90
4	(Germany) Opel	53

== Round 6 (Italy) Mugello ==
Qualifying

Pos	No	Driver	Car	Lap Time	Top Qualifying
1	5	(Italy) Gabriele Tarquini	Alfa Romeo 155	1.58.407	TQ
2	4	(Italy) Fabrizio Giovanardi	Alfa Romeo 155	1.59.560	TQ
3	1	(Italy) Emanuele Pirro	Audi A4 Quattro	1.59.607	TQ
4	7	(Italy) Emanuele Naspetti	BMW 318iS	2.00.079	TQ
5	2	(Italy) Rinaldo Capello	Audi A4 Quattro	2.00.157	TQ
6	11	(Italy) Roberto Colciago	Opel Vectra GT	2.00.178	TQ
7	9	(Italy) Gianni Morbidelli	BMW 318iS	2.00.409	TQ
8	3	(Italy) Antonio Tamburini	Alfa Romeo 155	2.00.722	TQ
9	6	(Argentina) Oscar Larrauri	Alfa Romeo 155	2.00.813	TQ
10	65	(Italy) Mauro Trione	Peugeot 405	2.04.765	TQ
11	63	(Italy) Gherardo Cazzago	Alfa Romeo 155	2.02.877	Top Private Qual
12	62	(Italy) Paolo Delle Piane	Alfa Romeo 155	2.03.826	Top Private Qual
13	8	(Switzerland) Yolanda Surer	BMW 318iS	2.02.410	
14	51	(Italy) Moreno Soli	Alfa Romeo 155	2.04.293	Top Private Qual
15	52	(Italy) Massimo Pigoli	Peugeot 405	2.05.042	Top Private Qual
16	54	(Italy) Danilo Mozzi	Alfa Romeo 155	2.03.359	
17	59	(Italy) Gianluca Roda	Alfa Romeo 155	2.03.555	
18	56	(Italy) Maurizio Lusuardi	BMW 318iS	2.04.460	
19	58	(Italy) Rocco Peduzzi	BMW 318iS	2.05.055	
20	81	(Italy) Guido Lucchetti Cigarini	Peugeot 405	2.08.735	
21	69	(Italy) Luigi Cevasco	Opel Vectra GT	2.10.309	

Race 1

Pos	No	Driver	Constructor	Time/Retired	Points
1	4	(Italy) Fabrizio Giovanardi	Alfa Romeo 155	15 laps in 30:47.381	20
2	7	(Italy) Emanuele Naspetti	BMW 318iS	+6.291s	15
3	1	(Italy) Emanuele Pirro	Audi A4 Quattro	+7.455s	12
4	3	(Italy) Antonio Tamburini	Alfa Romeo 155	+8.351s	10
5	9	(Italy) Gianni Morbidelli	BMW 318iS	+13.945s	8
6	6	(Argentina) Oscar Larrauri	Alfa Romeo 155	+25.149s	6
7	8	(Switzerland) Yolanda Surer	BMW 318iS	+39.522s	4
8	63	(Italy) Gherardo Cazzago	Alfa Romeo 155	+42.333s	3
9	62	(Italy) Paolo Delle Piane	Alfa Romeo 155	+43.630s	2
10	65	(Italy) Mauro Trione	Peugeot 405	+56.338s	1
11	51	(Italy) Moreno Soli	Alfa Romeo 155	+1.06.735s	
12	54	(Italy) Danilo Mozzi	Alfa Romeo 155	+1.08.878s	
13	52	(Italy) Massimo Pigoli	Peugeot 405	+1.12.746s	
14	59	(Italy) Gianluca Roda	Alfa Romeo 155	+1 lap	
DNF	5	(Italy) Gabriele Tarquini	Alfa Romeo 155	+1 lap	
DNF	58	(Italy) Rocco Peduzzi	BMW 318iS	+4 laps	
DNF	69	(Italy) Luigi Cevasco	Opel Vectra GT	+6 laps	
DNF	2	(Italy) Rinaldo Capello	Audi A4 Quattro	+8 laps	
DNF	11	(Italy) Roberto Colciago	Opel Vectra GT	+10 laps	
DNF	56	(Italy) Maurizio Lusuardi	BMW 318iS	+14 laps	
DNF	81	(Italy) Guido Lucchetti Cigarini	Peugeot 405	+15 laps	

Race 2

Pos	No	Driver	Constructor	Time/Retired	Points
1	5	(Italy) Gabriele Tarquini	Alfa Romeo 155	15 laps in 30:36.181	20
2	4	(Italy) Fabrizio Giovanardi	Alfa Romeo 155	+3.121s	15
3	7	(Italy) Emanuele Naspetti	BMW 318iS	+22.913s	12
4	3	(Italy) Antonio Tamburini	Alfa Romeo 155	+24.440s	10
5	1	(Italy) Emanuele Pirro	Audi A4 Quattro	+25.529s	8
6	2	(Italy) Rinaldo Capello	Audi A4 Quattro	+31.602s	6
7	9	(Italy) Gianni Morbidelli	BMW 318iS	+37.068s	4
8	8	(Switzerland) Yolanda Surer	BMW 318iS	+46.285s	3
9	62	(Italy) Paolo Delle Piane	Alfa Romeo 155	+1.27.954s	2
10	54	(Italy) Danilo Mozzi	Alfa Romeo 155	+1.28.294s	1
11	56	(Italy) Maurizio Lusuardi	BMW 318iS	+1.42.193s	
12	52	(Italy) Massimo Pigoli	Peugeot 405	+1.44.161s	
13	59	(Italy) Gianluca Roda	Alfa Romeo 155	+1 lap	
DNF	6	(Argentina) Oscar Larrauri	Alfa Romeo 155	+3 laps	
DNF	65	(Italy) Mauro Trione	Peugeot 405	+4 laps	
DNF	63	(Italy) Gherardo Cazzago	Alfa Romeo 155	+4 laps	
DNF	58	(Italy) Rocco Peduzzi	BMW 318iS	+10 laps	
DNF	51	(Italy) Moreno Soli	Alfa Romeo 155	+13 laps	
DNS	81	(Italy) Guido Lucchetti Cigarini	Peugeot 405		
DNS	69	(Italy) Luigi Cevasco	Opel Vectra GT		
DNS	11	(Italy) Roberto Colciago	Opel Vectra GT		

=== Championship standings after Round 6 ===
Drivers' Championship standings

Pos	Driver	Points
1	(Italy) Emanuele Pirro	205
2	(Italy) Rinaldo Capello	150
3	(Italy) Antonio Tamburini	106
4	(Italy) Emanuele Naspetti	103
5	(Italy) Fabrizio Giovanardi	89

Constructors' Championship standings

Pos	Constructor	Points
1	(Germany) Audi	210
2	(Italy) Alfa Romeo	158
3	(Germany) BMW	117
4	(Germany) Opel	53

== Round 7 (Italy) Misano Adriatico ==
Qualifying

Pos	No	Driver	Car	Lap Time	Top Qualifying
1	9	(Italy) Gianni Morbidelli	BMW 318iS	1.38.294	TQ
2	1	(Italy) Emanuele Pirro	Audi A4 Quattro	1.38.311	TQ
3	2	(Italy) Rinaldo Capello	Audi A4 Quattro	1.38.469	TQ
4	7	(Italy) Emanuele Naspetti	BMW 318iS	1.38.962	TQ
5	4	(Italy) Fabrizio Giovanardi	Alfa Romeo 155	1.39.005	TQ
6	3	(Italy) Antonio Tamburini	Alfa Romeo 155	1.39.027	TQ
7	6	(Argentina) Oscar Larrauri	Alfa Romeo 155	1.39.653	TQ
8	8	(Switzerland) Yolanda Surer	BMW 318iS	1.40.774	TQ
9	63	(Italy) Gherardo Cazzago	Alfa Romeo 155	1.41.312	TQ
10	11	(Italy) Roberto Colciago	Opel Vectra GT	no time	TQ
11	62	(Italy) Paolo Delle Piane	Alfa Romeo 155	1.41.471	Top Private Qual
12	51	(Italy) Moreno Soli	Alfa Romeo 155	1.41.629	Top Private Qual
13	65	(Italy) Mauro Trione	Peugeot 405	1.42.042	Top Private Qual
14	56	(Italy) Maurizio Lusuardi	BMW 318iS	1.42.687	Top Private Qual
15	59	(Italy) Gianluca Roda	Alfa Romeo 155	1.41.847	
16	54	(Italy) Danilo Mozzi	Alfa Romeo 155	1.41.902	
17	88	(Italy) Raffaele Fortunato	Alfa Romeo 155	1.42.079	
18	52	(Italy) Giovanni Ognio	Alfa Romeo 155	1.42.490	

Race 1

Pos	No	Driver	Constructor	Time/Retired	Points
1	1	(Italy) Emanuele Pirro	Audi A4 Quattro	18 laps in 29:55.124	20
2	2	(Italy) Rinaldo Capello	Audi A4 Quattro	+12.258s	15
3	9	(Italy) Gianni Morbidelli	BMW 318iS	+13.354s	12
4	7	(Italy) Emanuele Naspetti	BMW 318iS	+21.606s	10
5	4	(Italy) Fabrizio Giovanardi	Alfa Romeo 155	+23.513s	8
6	3	(Italy) Antonio Tamburini	Alfa Romeo 155	+26.485s	6
7	6	(Argentina) Oscar Larrauri	Alfa Romeo 155	+27.664s	4
8	11	(Italy) Roberto Colciago	Opel Vectra GT	+27.858s	3
9	8	(Switzerland) Yolanda Surer	BMW 318iS	+40.193s	2
10	63	(Italy) Gherardo Cazzago	Alfa Romeo 155	+48.634s	1
11	62	(Italy) Paolo Delle Piane	Alfa Romeo 155	+56.529s	
12	65	(Italy) Mauro Trione	Peugeot 405	+1.02.142s	
13	51	(Italy) Moreno Soli	Alfa Romeo 155	+1.03.174s	
14	54	(Italy) Danilo Mozzi	Alfa Romeo 155	+1.22.386s	
15	88	(Italy) Raffaele Fortunato	Alfa Romeo 155	+1.27.937s	
16	52	(Italy) Giovanni Ognio	Alfa Romeo 155	+1.37.635s	
17	59	(Italy) Gianluca Roda	Alfa Romeo 155	+1.38.799s	
18	56	(Italy) Maurizio Lusuardi	BMW 318iS	+2 laps	

Race 2

Pos	No	Driver	Constructor	Time/Retired	Points
1	1	(Italy) Emanuele Pirro	Audi A4 Quattro	18 laps in 30:07.193	20
2	3	(Italy) Antonio Tamburini	Alfa Romeo 155	+2.016s	15
3	2	(Italy) Rinaldo Capello	Audi A4 Quattro	+7.800s	12
4	8	(Switzerland) Yolanda Surer	BMW 318iS	+18.803s	10
5	63	(Italy) Gherardo Cazzago	Alfa Romeo 155	+22.967s	8
6	6	(Argentina) Oscar Larrauri	Alfa Romeo 155	+26.898s	6
7	4	(Italy) Fabrizio Giovanardi	Alfa Romeo 155	+30.612s	4
8	62	(Italy) Paolo Delle Piane	Alfa Romeo 155	+36.152s	3
9	51	(Italy) Moreno Soli	Alfa Romeo 155	+52.297s	2
10	11	(Italy) Roberto Colciago	Opel Vectra GT	+53.424s	1
11	9	(Italy) Gianni Morbidelli	BMW 318iS	+1.18.798s	
12	54	(Italy) Danilo Mozzi	Alfa Romeo 155	+1.20.066s	
13	65	(Italy) Mauro Trione	Peugeot 405	+1.28.558s	
DNF	7	(Italy) Emanuele Naspetti	BMW 318iS	+4 laps	
DNF	59	(Italy) Gianluca Roda	Alfa Romeo 155	+9 laps	
DNF	88	(Italy) Raffaele Fortunato	Alfa Romeo 155	+17 laps	
DNF	52	(Italy) Giovanni Ognio	Alfa Romeo 155	+17 laps	
DNF	56	(Italy) Maurizio Lusuardi	BMW 318iS	+18 laps	

=== Championship standings after Round 7 ===
Drivers' Championship standings

Pos	Driver	Points
1	(Italy) Emanuele Pirro	245
2	(Italy) Rinaldo Capello	177
3	(Italy) Antonio Tamburini	127
4	(Italy) Emanuele Naspetti	113
5	(Italy) Fabrizio Giovanardi	101

Constructors' Championship standings

Pos	Constructor	Points
1	(Germany) Audi	250
2	(Italy) Alfa Romeo	179
3	(Germany) BMW	139
4	(Germany) Opel	57

== Round 8 (Italy) Pergusa ==
Qualifying

Pos	No	Driver	Car	Lap Time	Top Qualifying
1	9	(Italy) Gianni Morbidelli	BMW 318iS	1.47.294	TQ
2	7	(Italy) Emanuele Naspetti	BMW 318iS	1.47.330	TQ
3	4	(Italy) Fabrizio Giovanardi	Alfa Romeo 155	1.47.371	TQ
4	3	(Italy) Antonio Tamburini	Alfa Romeo 155	1.47.442	TQ
5	2	(Italy) Rinaldo Capello	Audi A4 Quattro	1.47.631	TQ
6	1	(Italy) Emanuele Pirro	Audi A4 Quattro	1.47.655	TQ
7	11	(Italy) Roberto Colciago	Opel Vectra GT	1.48.669	TQ
8	63	(Italy) Gherardo Cazzago	Alfa Romeo 155	1.50.199	TQ
9	8	(Switzerland) Yolanda Surer	BMW 318iS	1.50.405	TQ
10	6	(Argentina) Oscar Larrauri	Alfa Romeo 155	1.52.973	TQ
11	65	(Italy) Mauro Trione	Peugeot 405	1.51.245	Top Private Qual
12	59	(Italy) Gianluca Roda	Alfa Romeo 155	1.51.816	Top Private Qual
13	52	(Italy) Giovanni Ognio	Alfa Romeo 155	1.52.640	Top Private Qual
14	51	(Italy) Moreno Soli	Alfa Romeo 155	1.52.813	Top Private Qual
15	54	(Italy) Danilo Mozzi	Alfa Romeo 155	1.52.123	
16	82	(Switzerland) Felipe Ortiz	Peugeot 405	1.54.911	
17	83	(Italy) Mariano Bellin	Peugeot 405	2.04.150	
18	62	(Italy) Paolo Delle Piane	Alfa Romeo 155	no time	

Race 1

Pos	No	Driver	Constructor	Time/Retired	Points
1	9	(Italy) Gianni Morbidelli	BMW 318iS	18 laps in 32:49.113	20
2	4	(Italy) Fabrizio Giovanardi	Alfa Romeo 155	+2.040s	15
3	2	(Italy) Rinaldo Capello	Audi A4 Quattro	+29.353s	12
4	3	(Italy) Antonio Tamburini	Alfa Romeo 155	+35.625s	10
5	1	(Italy) Emanuele Pirro	Audi A4 Quattro	+36.821s	8
6	51	(Italy) Moreno Soli	Alfa Romeo 155	+1.19.532s	6
7	63	(Italy) Gherardo Cazzago	Alfa Romeo 155	+1.20.882s	4
8	65	(Italy) Mauro Trione	Peugeot 405	+1.23.067s	3
9	59	(Italy) Gianluca Roda	Alfa Romeo 155	+1.23.571s	2
10	8	(Switzerland) Yolanda Surer	BMW 318iS	+1.34.744s	1
11	52	(Italy) Giovanni Ognio	Alfa Romeo 155	+1.49.979s	
12	62	(Italy) Paolo Delle Piane	Alfa Romeo 155	+1 lap	
13	54	(Italy) Danilo Mozzi	Alfa Romeo 155	+1 lap	
14	83	(Italy) Mariano Bellin	Peugeot 405	+2 laps	
DNF	6	(Argentina) Oscar Larrauri	Alfa Romeo 155	+3 laps	
DNF	7	(Italy) Emanuele Naspetti	BMW 318iS	+7 laps	
DNF	82	(Switzerland) Felipe Ortiz	Peugeot 405	+8 laps	
DNF	11	(Italy) Roberto Colciago	Opel Vectra GT	+16 laps	

Race 2

Pos	No	Driver	Constructor	Time/Retired	Points
1	9	(Italy) Gianni Morbidelli	BMW 318iS	18 laps in 32:33.464	20
2	4	(Italy) Fabrizio Giovanardi	Alfa Romeo 155	+0.925s	15
3	3	(Italy) Antonio Tamburini	Alfa Romeo 155	+12.877s	12
4	1	(Italy) Emanuele Pirro	Audi A4 Quattro	+30.366s	10
5	2	(Italy) Rinaldo Capello	Audi A4 Quattro	+1.04.878s	8
6	8	(Switzerland) Yolanda Surer	BMW 318iS	+1.05.772s	6
7	6	(Argentina) Oscar Larrauri	Alfa Romeo 155	+1.06.462s	4
8	63	(Italy) Gherardo Cazzago	Alfa Romeo 155	+1.26.411s	3
9	65	(Italy) Mauro Trione	Peugeot 405	+1.31.792s	2
10	52	(Italy) Giovanni Ognio	Alfa Romeo 155	+1.44.855s	1
11	51	(Italy) Moreno Soli	Alfa Romeo 155	+52.297s	
12	82	(Switzerland) Felipe Ortiz	Peugeot 405	+1 lap	
13	62	(Italy) Paolo Delle Piane	Alfa Romeo 155	+5 laps	
DNF	54	(Italy) Danilo Mozzi	Alfa Romeo 155	+6 laps	
DNF	83	(Italy) Mariano Bellin	Peugeot 405	+11 laps	
DNF	59	(Italy) Gianluca Roda	Alfa Romeo 155	+14 laps	
DNF	7	(Italy) Emanuele Naspetti	BMW 318iS	+18 laps	
DNS	11	(Italy) Roberto Colciago	Opel Vectra GT		

=== Championship standings after Round 8 ===
Drivers' Championship standings

Pos	Driver	Points
1	(Italy) Emanuele Pirro	263
2	(Italy) Rinaldo Capello	197
3	(Italy) Antonio Tamburini	149
4	(Italy) Fabrizio Giovanardi	131
5	(Italy) Gianni Morbidelli	120

Constructors' Championship standings

Pos	Constructor	Points
1	(Germany) Audi	272
2	(Italy) Alfa Romeo	209
3	(Germany) BMW	179
4	(Germany) Opel	57

== Round 9 (Italy) Varano De Melegari ==
Qualifying

Pos	No	Driver	Car	Lap Time	Top Qualifying
1	2	(Italy) Rinaldo Capello	Audi A4 Quattro	49.236	TQ
2	1	(Italy) Emanuele Pirro	Audi A4 Quattro	49.363	TQ
3	7	(Italy) Emanuele Naspetti	BMW 318iS	49.586	TQ
4	3	(Italy) Antonio Tamburini	Alfa Romeo 155	49.762	TQ
5	9	(Italy) Gianni Morbidelli	BMW 318iS	49.862	TQ
6	12	(Italy) Tamara Vidali	Audi A4 Quattro	49.974	TQ
7	4	(Italy) Fabrizio Giovanardi	Alfa Romeo 155	50.129	TQ
8	6	(Argentina) Oscar Larrauri	Alfa Romeo 155	50.400	TQ
9	8	(Switzerland) Yolanda Surer	BMW 318iS	50.603	TQ
10	11	(Italy) Roberto Colciago	Opel Vectra GT	50.639	TQ
11	62	(Italy) Paolo Delle Piane	Alfa Romeo 155	51.474	Top Private Qual
12	65	(Italy) Mauro Trione	Peugeot 405	51.614	Top Private Qual
13	63	(Italy) Gherardo Cazzago	Alfa Romeo 155	52.062	Top Private Qual
14	54	(Italy) Danilo Mozzi	Alfa Romeo 155	52.405	Top Private Qual
15	52	(Italy) Massimo Pigoli	Peugeot 405	51.385	
16	51	(Italy) Moreno Soli	Alfa Romeo 155	51.536	
17	68	(Italy) Giovanni Ognio	Alfa Romeo 155	51.687	
18	85	(Italy) Raffaele Fortunato	Peugeot 405	51.842	
19	59	(Italy) Gianluca Roda	Alfa Romeo 155	51.961	
20	56	(Italy) Maurizio Lusuardi	BMW 318iS	52.291	
21	83	(Italy) Gianpiero Pindari	Peugeot 405	53.134	

Race 1

Pos	No	Driver	Constructor	Time/Retired	Points
1	2	(Italy) Rinaldo Capello	Audi A4 Quattro	30 laps in 25:30.724	20
2	1	(Italy) Emanuele Pirro	Audi A4 Quattro	+0.544s	15
3	4	(Italy) Fabrizio Giovanardi	Alfa Romeo 155	+6.983s	12
4	65	(Italy) Mauro Trione	Peugeot 405	+1 lap	10
5	8	(Switzerland) Yolanda Surer	BMW 318iS	+1 lap	8
6	52	(Italy) Massimo Pigoli	Peugeot 405	+1 lap	6
7	51	(Italy) Moreno Soli	Alfa Romeo 155	+1 lap	4
8	54	(Italy) Danilo Mozzi	Alfa Romeo 155	+1 lap	3
9	56	(Italy) Maurizio Lusuardi	BMW 318iS	+1 lap	2
10	9	(Italy) Gianni Morbidelli	BMW 318iS	+1 lap	1
11	85	(Italy) Raffaele Fortunato	Peugeot 405	+2 laps	
12	63	(Italy) Gherardo Cazzago	Alfa Romeo 155	+2 laps	
13	83	(Italy) Gianpiero Pindari	Peugeot 405	+2 laps	
DNF	59	(Italy) Gianluca Roda	Alfa Romeo 155	+4 laps	
DNF	11	(Italy) Roberto Colciago	Opel Vectra GT	+5 laps	
DNF	12	(Italy) Tamara Vidali	Audi A4 Quattro	+6 laps	
DNF	6	(Argentina) Oscar Larrauri	Alfa Romeo 155	+20 laps	
DNF	7	(Italy) Emanuele Naspetti	BMW 318iS	+23 laps	
DNF	62	(Italy) Paolo Delle Piane	Alfa Romeo 155	+25 laps	
DNF	68	(Italy) Giovanni Ognio	Alfa Romeo 155	+26 laps	
DNF	3	(Italy) Antonio Tamburini	Alfa Romeo 155	+30 laps	

Race 2

Pos	No	Driver	Constructor	Time/Retired	Points
1	1	(Italy) Emanuele Pirro	Audi A4 Quattro	30 laps in 25:16.117	20
2	4	(Italy) Fabrizio Giovanardi	Alfa Romeo 155	+1.301s	15
3	2	(Italy) Rinaldo Capello	Audi A4 Quattro	+10.414s	12
4	9	(Italy) Gianni Morbidelli	BMW 318iS	+13.531s	10
5	7	(Italy) Emanuele Naspetti	BMW 318iS	+18.075s	8
6	3	(Italy) Antonio Tamburini	Alfa Romeo 155	+29.625s	6
7	12	(Italy) Tamara Vidali	Audi A4 Quattro	+39.529s	
8	6	(Argentina) Oscar Larrauri	Alfa Romeo 155	+44.297s	4
9	8	(Switzerland) Yolanda Surer	BMW 318iS	+49.806s	3
10	65	(Italy) Mauro Trione	Peugeot 405	+1 lap	2
11	62	(Italy) Paolo Delle Piane	Alfa Romeo 155	+1 lap	1
12	63	(Italy) Gherardo Cazzago	Alfa Romeo 155	+1 lap	
13	51	(Italy) Moreno Soli	Alfa Romeo 155	+1 lap	
14	83	(Italy) Gianpiero Pindari	Peugeot 405	+2 laps	
15	59	(Italy) Gianluca Roda	Alfa Romeo 155	+3 laps	
DNF	54	(Italy) Danilo Mozzi	Alfa Romeo 155	+20 laps	
DNF	52	(Italy) Massimo Pigoli	Peugeot 405	+23 laps	
DNF	56	(Italy) Maurizio Lusuardi	BMW 318iS	+23 laps	
DNF	85	(Italy) Raffaele Fortunato	Peugeot 405	+29 laps	
DNS	11	(Italy) Roberto Colciago	Opel Vectra GT		
DNS	68	(Italy) Giovanni Ognio	Alfa Romeo 155		

=== Championship standings after Round 9 ===
Drivers' Championship standings

Pos	Driver	Points
1	(Italy) Emanuele Pirro	298
2	(Italy) Rinaldo Capello	229
3	(Italy) Fabrizio Giovanardi	158
4	(Italy) Antonio Tamburini	155
5	(Italy) Gianni Morbidelli	131

Constructors' Championship standings

Pos	Constructor	Points
1	(Germany) Audi	312
2	(Italy) Alfa Romeo	238
3	(Germany) BMW	199
4	(Germany) Opel	57

== Round 10 (Italy) Vallelunga ==
Qualifying

Pos	No	Driver	Car	Lap Time	Top Qualifying
1	1	(Italy) Emanuele Pirro	Audi A4 Quattro	1.17.095	TQ
2	2	(Italy) Rinaldo Capello	Audi A4 Quattro	1.17.138	TQ
3	14	(Switzerland) Alain Menu	Renault Laguna	1.17.740	TQ
4	4	(Italy) Fabrizio Giovanardi	Alfa Romeo 155	1.18.029	TQ
5	3	(Italy) Antonio Tamburini	Alfa Romeo 155	1.18.362	TQ
6	15	(United Kingdom) Will Hoy	Renault Laguna	1.18.395	TQ
7	7	(Italy) Emanuele Naspetti	BMW 318iS	1.18.583	TQ
8	11	(Italy) Roberto Colciago	Opel Vectra GT	1.18.918	TQ
9	9	(Italy) Gianni Morbidelli	BMW 318iS	1.18.984	TQ
10	63	(Italy) Gherardo Cazzago	Alfa Romeo 155	1.21.015	TQ
11	55	(Italy) Felice Tedeschi	Alfa Romeo 155	1.20.845	Top Private Qual
12	65	(Italy) Mauro Trione	Peugeot 405	1.21.060	Top Private Qual
13	8	(Switzerland) Yolanda Surer	BMW 318iS	1.20.104	
14	62	(Italy) Paolo Delle Piane	Alfa Romeo 155	1.21.444	Top Private Qual
15	51	(Italy) Moreno Soli	Alfa Romeo 155	1.22.554	Top Private Qual
16	54	(Italy) Danilo Mozzi	Alfa Romeo 155	1.21.970	
17	85	(Italy) Raffaele Fortunato	Peugeot 405	1.21.988	

Race 1

Pos	No	Driver	Constructor	Time/Retired	Points
1	1	(Italy) Emanuele Pirro	Audi A4 Quattro	22 laps in 29:07.042	20
2	4	(Italy) Fabrizio Giovanardi	Alfa Romeo 155	+1.115s	15
3	3	(Italy) Antonio Tamburini	Alfa Romeo 155	+12.473s	12
4	2	(Italy) Rinaldo Capello	Audi A4 Quattro	+13.120s	10
5	15	(United Kingdom) Will Hoy	Renault Laguna	+25.385s	
6	9	(Italy) Gianni Morbidelli	BMW 318iS	+29.634s	8
7	7	(Italy) Emanuele Naspetti	BMW 318iS	+31.522s	6
8	11	(Italy) Roberto Colciago	Opel Vectra GT	+56.192s	4
9	8	(Switzerland) Yolanda Surer	BMW 318iS	+59.385s	3
10	63	(Italy) Gherardo Cazzago	Alfa Romeo 155	+1.10.791s	2
11	62	(Italy) Paolo Delle Piane	Alfa Romeo 155	+1.22.842s	1
12	55	(Italy) Felice Tedeschi	Alfa Romeo 155	+1 lap	
13	51	(Italy) Moreno Soli	Alfa Romeo 155	+7 laps	
14	65	(Italy) Mauro Trione	Peugeot 405	+9 laps	
DNF	14	(Switzerland) Alain Menu	Renault Laguna	+10 laps	
DNF	85	(Italy) Raffaele Fortunato	Peugeot 405	+12 laps	
DNF	54	(Italy) Danilo Mozzi	Alfa Romeo 155	+16 laps	

Race 2

Pos	No	Driver	Constructor	Time/Retired	Points
1	2	(Italy) Rinaldo Capello	Audi A4 Quattro	22 laps in 29:14.658	20
2	1	(Italy) Emanuele Pirro	Audi A4 Quattro	+0.136s	15
3	3	(Italy) Antonio Tamburini	Alfa Romeo 155	+0.652s	12
4	15	(United Kingdom) Will Hoy	Renault Laguna	+7.528s	
5	9	(Italy) Gianni Morbidelli	BMW 318iS	+12.882s	10
6	7	(Italy) Emanuele Naspetti	BMW 318iS	+17.265s	8
7	4	(Italy) Fabrizio Giovanardi	Alfa Romeo 155	+47.620s	6
8	8	(Switzerland) Yolanda Surer	BMW 318iS	+49.301s	4
9	65	(Italy) Mauro Trione	Peugeot 405	+1.15.961s	3
10	62	(Italy) Paolo Delle Piane	Alfa Romeo 155	+1.18.016s	2
11	85	(Italy) Raffaele Fortunato	Peugeot 405	+1 lap	1
12	51	(Italy) Moreno Soli	Alfa Romeo 155	+1 lap	
13	63	(Italy) Gherardo Cazzago	Alfa Romeo 155	+2 laps	
DNF	11	(Italy) Roberto Colciago	Opel Vectra GT	+16 laps	
DNF	55	(Italy) Felice Tedeschi	Alfa Romeo 155	+17 laps	
DNF	54	(Italy) Danilo Mozzi	Alfa Romeo 155	+17 laps	
DNS	14	(Switzerland) Alain Menu	Renault Laguna		

=== Championship standings after (Final) Round 10 ===
Drivers' Championship standings

Pos	Driver	Points
1	(Italy) Emanuele Pirro	(333) 317 after 2 worse results
2	(Italy) Rinaldo Capello	(259) 253 after 2 worse results
3	(Italy) Fabrizio Giovanardi	179 after 2 worse results
4	(Italy) Antonio Tamburini	179 after 2 worse results
5	(Italy) Gianni Morbidelli	149 after 2 worse results

Constructors' Championship standings

Pos	Constructor	Points
1	(Germany) Audi	352
2	(Italy) Alfa Romeo	265
3	(Germany) BMW	217
4	(Germany) Opel	61

== Championship standings ==
Points system
**1st**	**2nd**	**3rd**	**4th**	**5th**	**6th**	**7th**	**8th**	**9th**	**10th**
20	15	12	10	8	6	4	3	2	1

- 18 results on 20 are valid for the championship

=== Drivers Championship ===
Pos	Driver	Car	MIS (Italy)		BIN (Italy)		MON (Italy)		IMO (Italy)		MAG (Italy)		MUG (Italy)		MIS (Italy)		PER (Italy)		VAR (Italy)		VAL (Italy)		Pts
1	(Italy) Emanuele Pirro	Audi	**2**	1	1	**1**	1	**2**	1	**1**	**1**	**2**	3	(5)	1	**1**	(5)	4	2	1	**1**	**2**	**317** (333)
2	(Italy) Rinaldo Capello	Audi	3	2	**2**	2	4	3	**2**	2	2	1	Ret	(6)	2	3	3	5	**1**	3	4	1	**253** (259)
3	(Italy) Fabrizio Giovanardi	Alfa Romeo	Ret	5	4	4	6	14	5	Ret	6	6	1	**2**	5	7	2	2	3	2	2	7	**179**
4	(Italy) Antonio Tamburini	Alfa Romeo	4	3	Ret	6	3	5	4	4	4	5	4	4	6	2	4	3	Ret	6	3	3	**179**
5	(Italy) Gianni Morbidelli	BMW	Ret	6	6	7	5	4	7	Ret	5	4	5	7	**3**	11	**1**	**1**	10	4	6	5	**149**
6	(Italy) Emanuele Naspetti	BMW	5	4	5	5	7	Ret	6	5	3	3	2	3	4	Ret	Ret	Ret	Ret	5	7	6	**135**
7	(Italy) Gabriele Tarquini	Alfa Romeo	1	**Ret**	3	3	**Ret**	Ret	3	3	Ret	Ret	**Ret**	1									**88**
8	(Italy) Roberto Colciago	Opel	6	Ret	7	Ret	2	1	8	7	10	11	Ret	DNS	8	10	Ret	DNS	Ret	Ret	8	Ret	**61**
9	(Switzerland) Yolanda Surer	BMW	8	DNS	Ret	10	11	8	17	10	7	8	7	8	9	4	10	6	5	9	9	8	**59**
10	(Argentina) Oscar Larrauri	Alfa Romeo	7	7	8	8	Ret	Ret	18	6	18	7	6	Ret	7	6	Ret	7	Ret	8			**48**
11	(Italy) Gherardo Cazzago	Alfa Romeo					8	Ret			8	9	8	Ret	10	5	7	8	12	12	10	13	**29**
12	(Italy) Mauro Trione	Peugeot	10	Ret	9	9	17	9	Ret	DNS	11	12	10	Ret	12	13	8	9	4	10	14	9	**28**
13	(Italy) Paolo Delle Piane	Alfa Romeo	Ret	DNS	11	11	14	6	16	Ret	9	10	9	9	11	8	12	13	Ret	11	11	10	**20**
14	(Italy) Moreno Soli	Alfa Romeo	13	Ret	10	14	12	10	11	Ret	13	13	11	Ret	13	9	6	11	7	13	13	12	**14**
15	(Italy) Felice Tedeschi	Alfa Romeo	Ret	9	Ret	12	9	7	9	8	12	14									12	Ret	**13**
16	(Italy) Massimo Pigoli	Alfa Romeo - Peugeot	9	8	14	13	13	DSQ	10	11	DNS	Ret	13	12					6	Ret			**12**
17	(Italy) Danilo Mozzi	Alfa Romeo					10	13	13	9	17	17	12	10	14	12	13	Ret	8	Ret	Ret	Ret	**7**
18	(Italy) Maurizio Lusuardi	BMW	14	10	13	Ret	16	12	19	Ret			Ret	11	18	Ret			9	Ret			**3**
19	(Italy) Gianluca Roda	Alfa Romeo	11	Ret	12	Ret	15	11	12	Ret	14	16	14	13	17	Ret	9	Ret	Ret	15			**2**
20	(Italy) Giovanni Ognio	Opel - Alfa Romeo							14	Ret	15	15			16	Ret	11	10	Ret	Ret			**1**
21	(Italy) Raffaele Fortunato	Alfa Romeo - Peugeot													15	Ret			11	Ret	Ret	11	**1**
	(Italy) Emilio Arbizzi	Peugeot	17	11	15	18	18	Ret	DNS														**0**
	(Italy) Raffaele di Bari	Peugeot	16	Ret					15	12													**0**
	(Switzerland) Felipe Ortiz	Peugeot															Ret	12					**0**
	(Italy) Fabian Peroni	Alfa Romeo	12	Ret																			**0**
	(Italy) Gianfranco Pindari	Peugeot																	13	14			**0**
	(Italy) Mariano Bellin	Peugeot															14	Ret					**0**
	(Italy) Stefano Gabellini	Peugeot	15	Ret																			**0**
	(Italy) Claudio Melotto	Peugeot					Ret	Ret			16	18											**0**
	(Italy) Rocco Peduzzi	BMW											Ret	Ret									**0**
	(Italy) Luigi Cevasco	Opel											Ret	DNS									**0**
	(Italy) Guido Lucchetti Cigarini	Peugeot											Ret	DNS									**0**
Guest drivers ineligible for points
	(United Kingdom) Will Hoy	Renault																			5	4	**0**
	(Italy) Tamara Vidali	Audi																	Ret	7			**0**
	(Switzerland) Alain Menu	Renault																			Ret	DNS	**0**
Pos	Driver	MIS (Italy)		BIN (Italy)		MON (Italy)		IMO (Italy)		MAG (Italy)		MUG (Italy)		MIS (Italy)		PER (Italy)		VAR (Italy)		VAL (Italy)		Pts	

Colour	Result
Gold	Winner
Silver	Second place
Bronze	Third place
Green	Points classification
Blue	Non-points classification
Blue	Non-classified finish (NC)
Purple	Retired, not classified (Ret)
Red	Did not qualify (DNQ)
Red	Did not pre-qualify (DNPQ)
Black	Disqualified (DSQ)
White	Did not start (DNS)
White	Withdrew (WD)
White	Race cancelled (C)
Blank	Did not practice (DNP)
Blank	Did not arrive (DNA)
Blank	Excluded (EX)

**Bold** – Pole
Italics – Fastest Lap

=== Manufacturers' Trophy ===
Pos	Manufacturer	MIS (Italy)		BIN (Italy)		MON (Italy)		IMO (Italy)		MAG (Italy)		MUG (Italy)		MIS (Italy)		PER (Italy)		VAR (Italy)		VAL (Italy)		Pts
1	(Germany) Audi	2	1	1	1	1	2	1	1	1	1	3	5	1	1	3	4	1	1	1	1	**352**
2	(Italy) Alfa Romeo	1	3	3	3	3	5	3	3	4	5	1	1	5	2	2	2	3	2	2	3	**265**
3	(Germany) BMW	5	4	5	5	5	4	6	5	3	3	2	3	3	4	1	1	4	4	6	5	**217**
4	(Germany) Opel	6	Ret	7	Ret	2	1	8	7	10	11	Ret	DNS	8	10	Ret	DNS	Ret	Ret	8	Ret	**61**
Guest manufacturer ineligible for points
	(France) Renault																			5	4	**0**

=== Privateers' Omega Trophy ===
Pos	Driver	Car	MIS (Italy)		BIN (Italy)		MON (Italy)		IMO (Italy)		MAG (Italy)		MUG (Italy)		MIS (Italy)		PER (Italy)		VAR (Italy)		VAL (Italy)		Pts
1	(Italy) Mauro Trione	Peugeot	2		1	1	9	3			3	3	3	6	3	5	3	2	1	1		1	**218**
2	(Italy) Paolo Delle Piane	Alfa Romeo			3	2	6	1	7		2	2	2	1	2	2	6	6		2	2	2	**209**
3	(Italy) Gherardo Cazzago	Alfa Romeo					1				1	1	1	7	1	1	2	1	7	3	1	5	**203**
4	(Italy) Moreno Soli	Alfa Romeo	5	4	2	5	4	4	3		5	4	4		4	3	1	4	3	4		4	**185**
5	(Italy) Felice Tedeschi	Alfa Romeo		2		3	2	2	1	1	4	5									3		**127**
6	(Italy) Massimo Pigoli	Alfa Romeo: Peugeot	1	1	6	4	5		2	3			6	4					2				**122**
7	(Italy) Danilo Mozzi	Alfa Romeo					3	7	5	2	8	8	5	2	5	4	7		4				**100**
8	(Italy) Gianluca Roda	Alfa Romeo	3		4		7	5	4		6	7	7	5	8		4		8	5			**90**
9	(Italy) Maurizio Lusuardi	BMW	6	3	5		8	6						3	9				5				**57**
10	(Italy) Giovanni Ognio	Opel; Alfa Romeo							6		7	6			7		5	3					**40**
11	(Italy) Raffaele Fortunato	Alfa Romeo; Peugeot													6				6			3	**24**
12	(Italy) Fabian Peroni	Alfa Romeo	4																				**10**
13	(Switzerland) Felipe Ortiz	Peugeot																5					**8**
14	(Italy) Mariano Bellin	Peugeot															8						**3**
	(Italy) Rocco Peduzzi	BMW											8										**3**
	(Italy) Luigi Cevasco	Opel																					0
	(Italy) Guido Lucchetti Cigarini	Peugeot																					0

=== Privateers' Cup ===
Pos	Driver	Car	Points
1	(Italy) Emilio Arbizzi	Peugeot	112
2	(Italy) Raffaele di Bari	Peugeot	70
3	(Italy) Claudio Melotto	Peugeot	40
4	(Italy) Gianfranco Pindari	Peugeot	40
5	(Italy) Stefano Gabellini	Peugeot	20
