= Emanuele Naspetti =

Italian racing driver (born 1968)

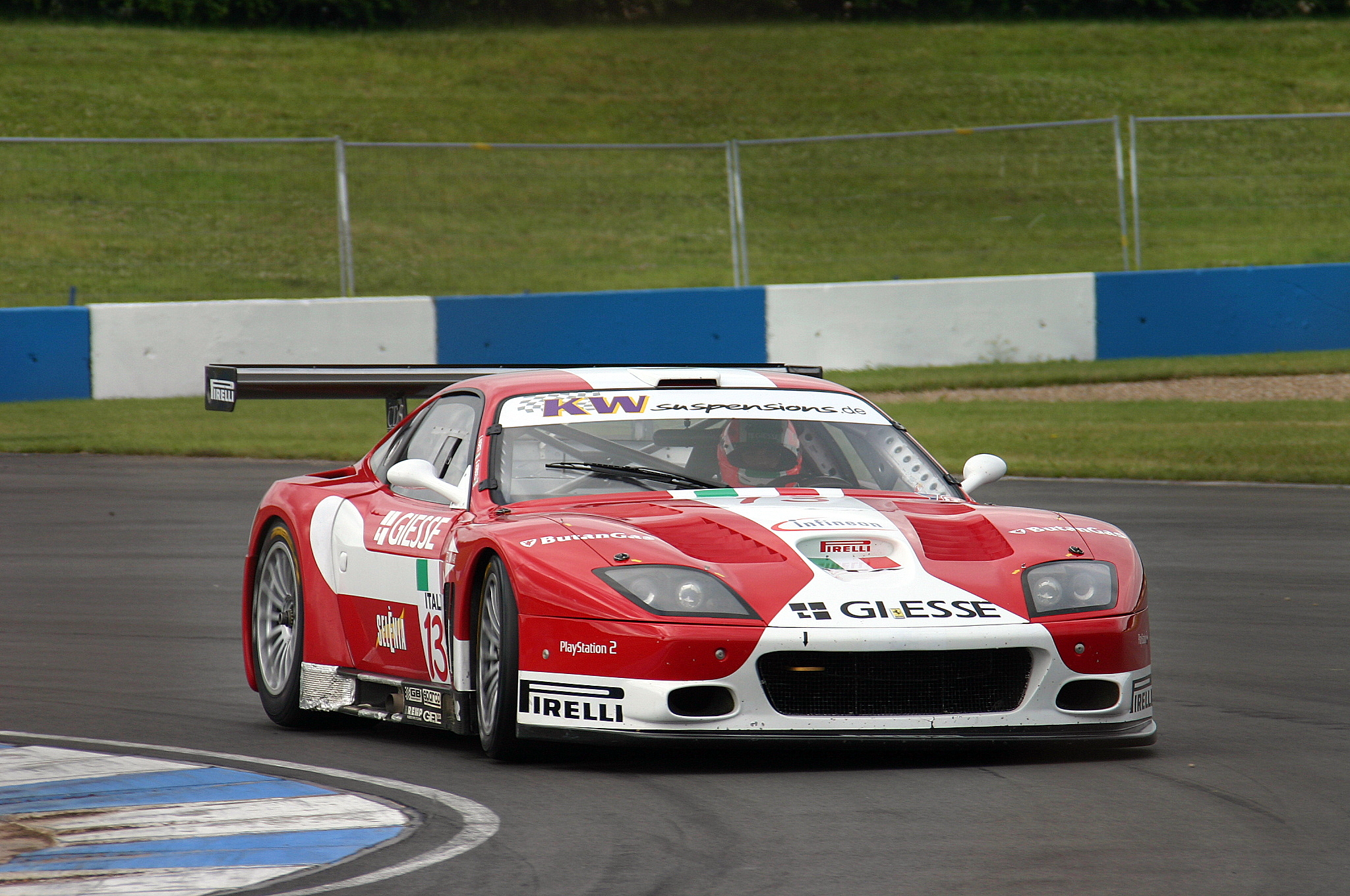
- Born: 24 February 1968 (age 58); Ancona, Italy

Formula One World Championship career
- Active years: 1992–1993
- Team(s): March, Jordan
- Entries: 6
- Championships: 0
- Wins: 0
- Podiums: 0
- Career points: 0
- Pole positions: 0
- Fastest laps: 0
- First entry: 1992 Belgian Grand Prix
- Last entry: 1993 Portuguese Grand Prix

Previous series
- 2006 2006 2004 2003 2002 2001 2000 2000 1999 1998 1997 1996 1995 1994: WTCC; Italian Superturismo; FIA GT Championship; American Le Mans Series; American Le Mans Series; FIA GT Championship; 24 Hours of Le Mans; Euro STC; Italian Superturismo; Italian Superturismo; Italian Superturismo; Italian Superturismo; Italian Superturismo; Italian Superturismo

Championship titles
- 1997 1988: Italian Superturismo; Italian Formula Three

Emanuele Naspetti (born 24 February 1968) is a racing driver and entrepreneur from Italy.

== Career ==
=== Karting ===
Naspetti made his racing debut at the age of 12 and spent seven years in karting (1980–1986), participating in more than 200 races and achieving success in Italian and international events.

=== Formula 3 ===
In 1987, Naspetti joined the Forti Corse Team to compete in the Italian Formula 3 Championship. In 1988, again with the Dallara-Alfa Romeo of Forti Corse, he was crowned Italian Formula 3 Champion.

=== Formula 3000 ===
In 1989, Naspetti competed in the FIA International Formula 3000 Championship with the Roni Motorsport Team. He enjoyed an extremely good debut season, resulting in him joining the Eddie Jordan Racing team for the following year to replace the reigning champion Jean Alesi, who had moved to Formula 1. In 1991, Naspetti rejoined Forti Corse and came very close to winning the title, taking four race wins. In the meantime, he won his debut race (Varano, Class S2) in the Italian Superturismo Championship with the official Peugeot 405 racer.

=== Formula 1 ===
In 1992, Naspetti made his debut in Formula One at the wheel of a March-Ilmor, an important decision that forced him to abandon the FIA International Formula 3000 Championship while leading it a few races before the end. His Formula 1 career continued in 1993 with Jordan Grand Prix, as the team's official test driver. In the same year, he took part in some races of the Japanese Formula 3000 Championship.

=== Touring and GT cars ===
From 1994, Naspetti focused on racing saloon cars in Super Touring championships. With 31 wins he became the symbol of BMW's sporting heritage and in 1997 he won the Italian Superturismo Championship. In the same year, he participated in the 24 Hours of Spa, winning the diesel classification and finishing third overall. In 2000, he participated in the 24 Hours of Le Mans driving a Lola-Judd, while his GT career began in 2001 with a Ferrari 550 Maranello run by the Rafanelli Team in the FIA GT Championship. In 2002 and 2003, he raced in the U.S. in the American Le Mans Series driving a Ferrari 550 Maranello. In 2004, he returned to Europe, again in the FIA GT Championship, at the wheel of a Ferrari 575 run by the GPC Team. In 2005, a call from the legendary Don Panoz, brought him back to the American scene, driving a Panoz in the 12 Hours of Sebring. In 2006, he was at the wheel of a BMW in the reborn Italian Superturismo Championship, taking five wins and finishing second in the overall standings, while in 2009 he took part in the Porsche Carrera Cup in Italy, winning the race in Adria.

== Racing record ==
=== Complete International Formula 3000 results ===
(key) (Races in bold indicate pole position) (Races in italics indicate fastest lap)

Year	Entrant	Chassis	Engine	1	2	3	4	5	6	7	8	9	10	11	DC	Points
1989	Roni Motorsport	Reynard 89D	Cosworth	SIL; 16	VAL; 5	PAU; DNQ	JER; Ret	PER; Ret	BRH; 9	BIR; Ret	SPA; Ret	BUG; 10	DIJ; 10		17th	2
1990	Jordan Racing	Reynard 90D	Mugen-Honda	DON; Ret	SIL; 10	PAU; Ret	JER	MNZ; Ret	PER; Ret	HOC; Ret	BRH; Ret	BIR; 6	BUG; DNQ	NOG	22nd	1
1991	Forti Corse	Lola T91/50	Ford Cosworth	VAL; 10	PAU; 9	JER; DNQ									**3rd**	**37**
1991	Forti Corse	Reynard 91D	Cosworth				MUG; DNS	**PER**; 1	HOC; 1	BRH; 1	SPA; 1	BUG; Ret	NOG; 6		**3rd**	**37**
1992	Forti Corse	Reynard 92D	Cosworth	SIL; 6	PAU; 1	CAT; 16	PER; 2	HOC; 4	**NÜR**; Ret	SPA	ALB	NOG	MAG		6th	19

=== Complete Formula One results ===
(key)

Year	Entrant	Chassis	Engine	1	2	3	4	5	6	7	8	9	10	11	12	13	14	15	16	WDC	Points
1992	March F1	March CG911	Ilmor V10	RSA	MEX	BRA	ESP	SMR	MON	CAN	FRA	GBR	GER	HUN	BEL; 12	ITA; Ret	POR; 11	JPN; 13	AUS; Ret	NC	0
1993	Sasol Jordan	Jordan 193	Hart V10	RSA	BRA	EUR	SMR	ESP	MON	CAN	FRA	GBR	GER	HUN	BEL	ITA	POR; Ret	JPN	AUS	NC	0

=== Complete Japanese Formula 3000 results ===
(key) (Races in bold indicate pole position; races in italics indicate fastest lap)

Year	Entrant	1	2	3	4	5	6	7	8	9	10	11	DC	Points
1993	Dome	SUZ; 17	FUJ; 16	MIN; Ret	SUZ; Ret	AUT	SUG	FUJ	FUJ	SUZ	FUJ	SUZ	NC	0

=== Complete Italian Superturismo Championship results ===
(key) (Races in bold indicate pole position) (Races in italics indicate fastest lap)

Year	Team	Car	1	2	3	4	5	6	7	8	9	10	11	12	13	14	15	16	17	18	19	20	DC	Pts
1994	CiBiEmme Engineering	BMW 318i	MNZ; 1; 14	MNZ; 2; 7	VAL; 1; 15	VAL; 2; 14	MAG; 1; 5	MAG; 2; 16	BIN; 1; 5	BIN; 2; 4	MIS; 1; 14	MIS; 2 Ret	VAL; 1 Ret	VAL; 2; 7	MUG; 1; 17	MUG; 2 Ret	PER; 1; 8	PER; 2; 9	VAR; 1; 14	VAR; 2 Ret	MUG; 1; 1	**MUG**; **2** Ret	9th	59
1995	CiBiEmme Engineering	BMW 318i	MIS; 1; 5	MIS; 2; 4	BIN; 1; 5	BIN; 2; 5	MNZ; 1; 7	MNZ; 2 Ret	IMO; 1; 6	IMO; 2; 5	MAG; 1; 3	MAG; 2; 3	MUG; 1; 2	MUG; 2; 3	MIS; 1; 4	MIS; 2 Ret	PER; 1 Ret	PER; 2 Ret	VAR; 1 Ret	VAR; 2; 5	VAL; 1; 7	VAL; 2; 6	6th	135
1996	CiBiEmme Engineering	BMW 320i	MUG; 1; 3	MUG; 2; 2	MAG; 1; 5	MAG; 2; 4	MNZ; 1; 8	MNZ; 2 Ret	BIN; 1; 4	BIN; 2; 4	MIS; 1; 2	MIS; 2; 2	IMO; 1; 3	IMO; 2; 1	PER; 1; 1	**PER**; **2**; 1	PER; 1; 1	**PER**; **2**; 1	VAR; 1; 2	VAR; 2; 1	VAL; 1; 6	VAL; 2; 7	3rd	242
1997	CiBiEmme Engineering	BMW 320i	**MNZ**; **1**; 1	**MNZ**; **2**; 1	MUG; 1; 1	**MUG**; **2**; 2	MAG; 1; 1	**MAG**; **2**; 1	IMO; 1; 2	IMO; 2; 1	IMO; 1; 2	IMO; 2; 1	BIN; 2; 1	**BIN**; **1**; 2	PER; 1; 2	PER; 2; 2	VAR; 1; 5	VAR; 2 Ret	MIS; 1; 1	**MIS**; **2**; 1	VAL; 1; 2	VAL; 2; 3	1st	325
1998	CiBiEmme Engineering	BMW 320i	BIN; 1; 2	BIN; 2; 1	IMO; 1; 3	IMO; 2; 2	MNZ; 1; 8	MNZ; 2; 4	VAR; 1; 1	**VAR**; **2**; 1	VAL; 1; 1	**VAL**; **2**; 1	MAG; 1; 3	MAG; 2 Ret	PER; 1; 2	PER; 2; 3	MIS; 1 Ret	MIS; 2 Ret	MNZ; 1; 4	MNZ; 2; 2	VAL; 1 Ret	VAL; 2 Ret	2nd	335
1999	CiBiEmme Engineering	BMW 320i	MIS; 1; 2	MIS; 2; 4	BIN; 1; 1	**BIN**; **2**; 3	**IMO**; **1**; 1	**IMO**; **2**; 1	PER; 1; 2	PER; 2 Ret	MAG; 1; 2	MAG; 2; 2	MUG; 1; 2	MUG; 2; 4	MIS; 1; 2	MIS; 2; 1	VAR; 1; 2	VAR; 2; 2	MNZ; 1; 4	MNZ; 2 Ret	VAL; 1; 3	VAL; 2; 2	2nd	387
2006	GDL Racing	BMW 320i	MNZ; 1; 8	MNZ; 2 DNS	MCO; 1; 3	MCO; 2 Ret	IMO; 1; 1	**IMO**; **2**; 1	MUG; 1; 3	MUG; 2; 8	MAG; 1; 1	**MAG**; **2**; 1	VAL; 1; 2	VAL; 2; 4	VAL; 1; 2	VAL; 2; 1							2nd	85

=== Complete European Touring Car Championship results ===
Year	Team	Car	1	2	3	4	5	6	7	8	9	10	11	12	13	14	15	16	17	18	19	20	DC	Pts
2000	CiBiEmme Engineering	BMW 320i	MUG; 1 Ret	MUG; 2; 6	PER; 1; 4	PER; 2; 2	A1R; 1; 6	A1R; 2; 5	MNZ; 1; 4	MNZ; 2; 2	HUN; 1; 3	HUN; 2; 2	IMO; 1; 4	IMO; 2; 11	MIS; 1; 3	MIS; 2; 2	BRN; 1; 6	BRN; 2; 4	VAL; 1 Ret	VAL; 2; 4	MOB; 1; 3	MOB; 2; 9	5th	174

=== Le Mans 24 Hours results ===
Year	Team	Co-drivers	Car	Class	Laps	Pos.	Class Pos.
2000	(Italy) Team Rafanelli SRL	(Italy) Domenico Schiattarella (Belgium) Didier de Radiguès	Lola B2K/10-Judd	LMP900	154	DNF	DNF

=== Complete FIA GT Championship results ===
(key)

Year	Team	Class	Car	Engine	1	2	3	4	5	6	7	8	9	10	11	Pos.	Points
2001	Team Rafanelli	GT	Ferrari 550 Millennio	Ferrari F133 6.0 L V12	MNZ; Ret	BRN; 5	MAG; 4	SIL; 5	ZOL; Ret	HUN	SPA; Ret	A1R; Ret	NÜR	JAR		22nd	7
2001	Racing Box	GT	Chrysler Viper GTS-R	Chrysler 356-T6 8.0 L V10											EST; Ret	22nd	7
2004	GPC Giesse Squadra Corse	GT	Ferrari 575 GTC	Ferrari F133 GT 6.0 L V12	MNZ; 4	VAL; Ret	MAG; 13	HOC; 5	BRN; Ret	DON; 6	SPA; 6	A1R; 6	OSC; Ret	DUB; 9	ZHU; 6	10th	21

=== Complete World Touring Car Championship results ===
(key) (Races in bold indicate pole position) (Races in italics indicate fastest lap)

Year	Team	Car	1	2	3	4	5	6	7	8	9	10	11	12	13	14	15	16	17	18	19	20	DC	Points
2006	GDL Racing	BMW 320i	ITA; 1; 30†	ITA; 2 DNS	FRA; 1; 17	FRA; 2 Ret	GBR; 1	GBR; 2	GER; 1	GER; 2	BRA; 1	BRA; 2	MEX; 1	MEX; 2	CZE; 1	CZE; 2	TUR; 1	TUR; 2	ESP; 1	ESP; 2	MAC; 1	MAC; 2	NC	0

Sporting positions
Preceded by Enrico Bertaggia	Italian Formula Three Championship; Champion; 1988	Succeeded by Gianni Morbidelli
Preceded by Rinaldo Capello	Italia Superturismo Championship; Champion; 1997	Succeeded by Fabrizio Giovanardi
