= Gianluca Roda =

Italian auto racing driver (born 1959)

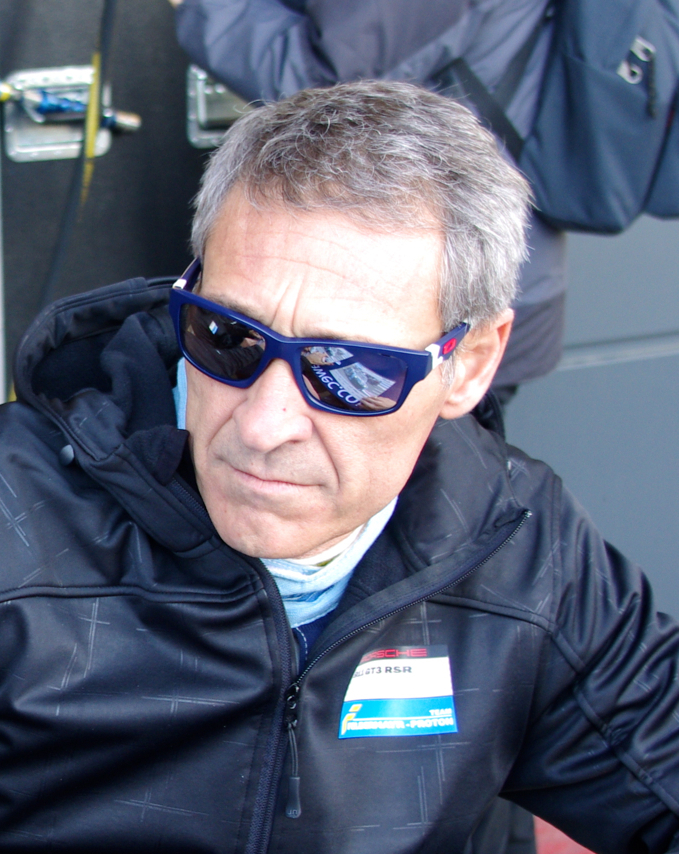
- Roda in 2013
- Nationality: (Italy) Italian
- Born: 5 June 1959 (age 67) Como, Italy
- Relatives: Davide Roda (brother); Andrea Roda (son); Giorgio Roda (son)
- Categorisation: FIA Silver (until 2013); FIA Bronze (2014–)

Gianluca Roda (born 5 June 1959 in Como) is an Italian auto racing driver and entrepreneur.

Roda won the Porsche Cup, an annual award presented by Porsche AG to recognize the world's most successful privateer racing driver competing with Porsche machinery in a customer racing team, in 2010 and 2011.

== Career ==
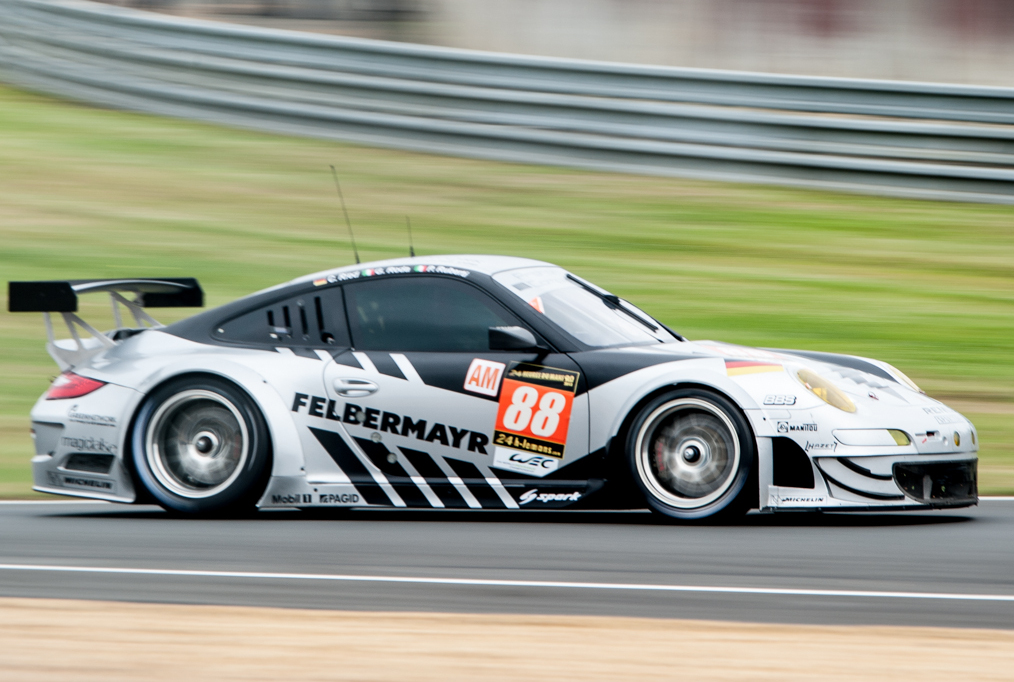
Roda's Proton Porsche at the 2013 Le Mans 24 Hours.

Most of his career has been spent in touring car racing in the Italian Superturismo Championship.

=== Complete Italian Superturismo Championship results ===
Year	Team	Car	1	2	3	4	5	6	7	8	9	10	11	12	13	14	15	16	17	18	19	20	DC	Pts
1993	Greyhound Motorsport	BMW 318i	MNZ; 1	MNZ; 2	VAL; 1	VAL; 2	MIS; 1; 12	MIS; 2 Ret	MAG; 1; 12	MAG; 2; 15	BIN; 1; 10	BIN; 2; 9	IMO; 1; 12	IMO; 2 Ret	VAR; 1 Ret	VAR; 2; 18	MIS; 1; 15	MIS; 2 Ret	PER; 1	PER; 2	MUG; 1; 13	MUG; 2 Ret	27th	3
1994	Top Run	Alfa Romeo 155 TS	MNZ; 1	MNZ; 2	VAL; 1	VAL; 2	MAG; 1	MAG; 2	BIN; 1	BIN; 2	MIS; 1	MIS; 2	VAL; 1	VAL; 2	MUG; 1; 19	MUG; 2; 14	PER; 1	PER; 2	VAR; 1; 16	VAR; 2 Ret	MUG; 1; 14	MUG; 2; 10	28th	0,5
1995	Top Run	Alfa Romeo 155 TS	MIS; 1; 11	MIS; 2 Ret	BIN; 1; 12	BIN; 2 Ret	MNZ; 1; 15	MNZ; 2; 11	IMO; 1; 12	IMO; 2 Ret	MAG; 1; 14	MAG; 2; 16	MUG; 1; 14	MUG; 2; 13	MIS; 1; 17	MIS; 2 Ret	PER; 1; 9	PER; 2 Ret	VAR; 1 Ret	VAR; 2; 15	VAL; 1	VAL; 2	19th	2
1997	Greyhound Motorsport	Opel Vectra	MNZ; 1; 8	MNZ; 2; 13	MUG; 1; 6	MUG; 2 Ret	MAG; 1; 9	MAG; 2 Ret	IMO; 1; 10	IMO; 2; 10	IMO; 1 Ret	IMO; 2; 11	BIN; 1; 7	BIN; 2 Ret	PER; 1; 8	PER; 2 Ret	VAR; 1; 8	VAR; 2; 10	MIS; 1; 7	MIS; 2; 8	VAL; 1; 10	VAL; 2; 10	11th	33
1998	Greyhound Motorsport	Alfa Romeo 155 TS	BIN; 1; 13	BIN; 2 Ret	IMO; 1; 14	IMO; 2; 11	MNZ; 1; 11	MNZ; 2; 13	VAR; 1 Ret	VAR; 2; 13	VAL; 1; 13	VAL; 2; 9	MAG; 1	MAG; 2	PER; 1 DNS	PER; 2 DNS	MIS; 1; 12	MIS; 2; 5	MNZ; 1 DNS	MNZ; 2 DNS	VAL; 1	VAL; 2	16th	20

=== Complete European Touring Car Championship results ===
(key) (Races in bold indicate pole position) (Races in italics indicate fastest lap)

Year	Team	Car	1	2	3	4	5	6	7	8	9	10	11	12	13	14	15	16	17	18	19	20	DC	Pts
2000	Greyhound Motorsport	Opel Vectra	MUG; 1	MUG; 2	PER; 1	PER; 2	A1R; 1 DNS	A1R; 2; 12	MNZ; 1 Ret	MNZ; 2; 11	HUN; 1	HUN; 2	IMO; 1; 10	IMO; 2; 8	MIS; 1 Ret	MIS; 2; 11	BRN; 1; 11	BRN; 2; 13	VAL; 1; 13	VAL; 2; 10	MOB; 1; 13	MOB; 2 Ret	19th	6
2001	Greyhound Motorsport	Opel Vectra	MNZ; 1 Ret	MNZ; 2; 9	BRN; 1; 6	BRN; 2; 15	MAG; 1; 12	MAG; 2; 9	SIL; 1 DNS	SIL; 2; 13	ZOL; 1; 7	ZOL; 2; 8	HUN; 1 Ret	HUN; 2 DNS	A1R; 1	A1R; 2	NÜR; 1; 9	NÜR; 2; 14	JAR; 1	JAR; 2	EST; 1	EST; 2	17th	209
