= Paolo Delle Piane =

Italian racing driver

Paolo Delle Piane (born 1 May 1964 in Bologna) is a retired Italian racing driver. He competed in the International Formula 3000 series during the early 1990s after spending multiple years in Italian F3.

== See also ==
- Motorsport in Italy
