= Félipe Ortiz =

Guatemalan sports shooter

Personal information
- Born: 20 May 1932 Guatemala City, Guatemala
- Died: 29 October 2023 (aged 91)

Sport
- Sport: Sports shooting

Félipe Ortiz (20 May 1932 – 29 October 2023) was a Guatemalan former sports shooter. He competed in the 300 metre rifle event at the 1968 Summer Olympics.
