= Motorsport in Italy =

This article gives a general overview of motorsport in Italy. For a more exhaustive view see; Motorsport in Italy by decade and Motorsport in Italy by year. Motorsport is widely popular in Italy, and its history spans over a century back to the early 1900s. Today, Italy is considered a hub of motorsport in terms of racing venues, drivers, teams, and manufacturers. It hosts annual races across Formula One, MotoGP, the World Touring Car Cup, and other prominent motor racing series.

== Early history (1900s - 1930s) ==
=== 1900s ===
One of the first instances of Italy's involvement in motorsport was the 1904 Gordon Bennett Cup, which featured three Italian entrants all racing in FIAT's. Vincenzo Lancia, the eventual founder of Lancia, finished as the fastest Italian by earning eighth place. The first-ever Grand Prix race, the 1906 French Grand Prix, featured multiple Italian drivers and automobiles. The highest Italian finisher was Felice Nazzaro, who finished second place in his FIAT 130HP. A year later, the 1907 Peking to Paris motor race was won by the Italian Prince Scipione Borghese in his Itala 35/45 HP.

One of, if not the first known motor race to take place in Italy was the 1906 Targa Florio, a road endurance race run across the island of Sicily. The Targa Florio formally took place annually through 1977, and it is still run to this day as a historical exhibition event.

=== 1910s ===
In 1911, the first ever Indianapolis 500 was held. While there were no Italian entrants, Italian-born American Ralph DePalma was in the field, driving his Simplex to a sixth place finish. DePalma would later go on to win the Indianapolis 500, taking the 1915 race in a Mercedes after leading 132 of the 200 laps. DePalma is one of the earliest prominent American auto racers -- he supposedly won more than 2,000 races over the course of his auto racing career, and is inducted into multiple motorsport halls of fame.

=== 1920s ===
==== The Italian Grand Prix and Monza ====
1921 featured the first-ever Italian Grand Prix, which took place in Montichiary, Italy, and featured two Italian entrants. The Italian Grand Prix has since been held annually, and one year after the inaugural race it was moved to the Autodromo Nazionale di Monza, which has hosted the race nearly every year up to today. The race has been a part of Formula One World Championship calendar every year since the sport's inception in 1950 and it is the most held national Grand Prix in history. The first ever Italian winner of the storied race was Pietro Bordino, who took home the 1922 victory in his Fiat. However, an Italian driver has not won the race since 1966, when Ludovico Scarfiotti took home the win in his Ferrari 312 F1. That would in fact be Scarfiotti's lone finish in the 1966 Formula One season, which saw him finish tenth in the drivers' championship.

Monza Circuit is the third-oldest purpose-built motor racing circuit in the world and today it hosts rounds of the GT World Challenge Endurance Cup, International GT Open and Euroformula Open Championship, as well as various local championships such as the TCR Italian Series, Italian GT Championship, Porsche Carrera Cup Italia and Italian F4 Championship, as well as the Monza Rally Show.

==== Other notable events in 1920s Italian motorsport history ====
In 1924, Giulio Foresti became the first Italian entrant in the 24 Hours of Le Mans in the race's second-ever running. He and French co-driver Arthur Duray did not finish the race due to an engine issue. One year later, there were seven Italian entries in the famous endurance race, led by Officine Meccaniche's entry of Tino and Mario Danieli who would finish fourth in their OM Tipo 665S Superba. Four years later, Boris Ivanowski and his co-driver Attilio Marinoni won the fifth running of the 24 Hours of Spa in their Alfa Romeo 6C 1500 S, making Marinoni the first Italian winner in the event's history.

The first ever Mille Miglia took place in 1927, and Ferdinandno Minoia and Giuseppe Morandi would win in their OM 665 S, beginning a streak of four consecutive Mille Miglia's won by Italian driver lineups to begin the race's history.

Three Italians -- Goffredo Zehender, Guglielmo Sandri, and Diego de Sterlich -- took part in the first-ever Monaco Grand Prix in 1929. All three retired before the conclusion of the race.

=== 1930s ===
==== AIACR European Championship ====
1931 was the inaugural season of the AIACR European Championship, an annual Grand Prix racing competition throughout Europe that was one of the primary predecessors to Formula One. Ferdinando Minoia, the 1927 Mille Miglia winner, was the competition's first champion. One year later, Tazio Nuvolari would secure back-to-back championships by Italian drivers, though him and Minoia would wind up as the only Italian winners in the competition's history by the time it folded in 1939.

==== Monaco Grands Prix ====
In 1931, Luigi Fagioli and Achille Varzi became the first Italian podium finishers in Monaco Grand Prix history, finishing second and third, respectively. Tazio Nuvolari would win the race one year later, becoming the first Italian winner in the race's history. The most recent Italian Monaco Grand Prix winner is Jarno Trulli, who won the 2004 race for Renault.

== World War II and the mid-20th century (1940s - 1960s) ==
=== 1940s ===
==== Impact of World War II on Italian motorsport ====
World War II saw the cancellation of many motorsport events for multiple years over the late 1930s and early-to-mid 1940s, including many notable Italian events. The Italian Grand Prix was not held for eight straight years from 1939 through 1946, and there were no organized Grand Prix championships held between 1940 and 1945. 1946 saw the return of formal organized Grand Prix racing, and that year's season included both the Turin and Milan Grands Prix.

==== Post-World War II and the emergence of Ferrari ====
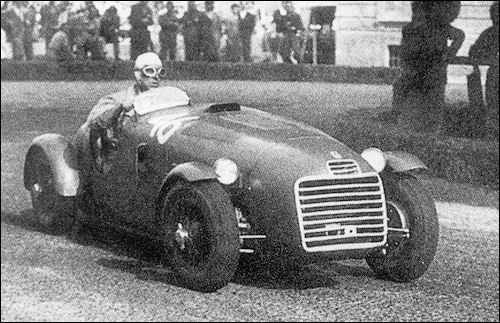
The Ferrari 125 S, driven by Franco Cortese

In 1947, the Ferrari 125 S became the first racing vehicle to bear the Ferrari name and badge. Just weeks after its first ever race, the 125 S won the Rome Grand Prix for its first-ever Grand Prix victory; the car was driven by Italian racer Franco Cortese. One year later, the 125 F1 was created and became Ferrari's first Formula 1 racecar, driven by future two-time F1 world champion Alberto Ascari.

1949 was the inaugural season of MotoGP, the world's highest-level professional motorcycle racing class. Across the five different "classes" of competition based on engine size, there were five Italian race winners and two class champions.

=== 1950s ===
==== Formula 1 and Scuderia Ferrari ====
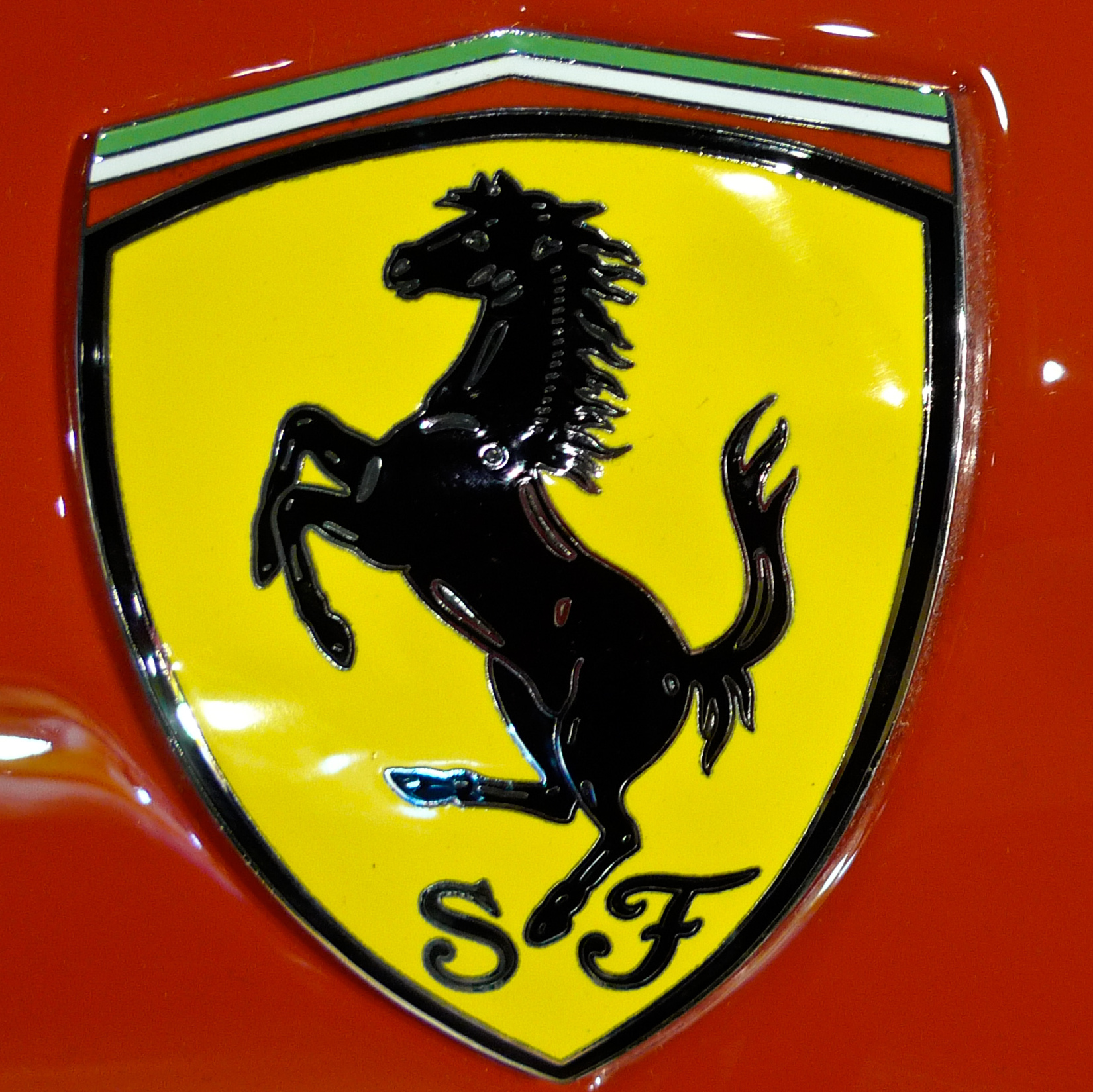
The Scuderia Ferrari badge, first featured on an F1 car in 1947

In 1950 the first season of modern Formula 1 racing commenced, and that year's lineup featured six Italian teams and a total of twelve Italian drivers across the seven races, most notably Scuderia Ferrari and Alberto Ascari, respectively. The first ever official Formula 1 Grand Prix, the 1950 British Grand Prix, was dominated by Italian drivers and constructors. Giuseppe Farina earned pole position, fastest lap, and won the race in his Alfa Romeo, catapulting him to his eventual world championship title. To this day, fellow Italian constructor Scuderia Ferrari is the most successful team in Formula 1 history. Across 1,006 Formula 1 race entries and 71 seasons, Ferrari has captured 16 constructors' championships, 15 drivers' championships, and 238 race victories.

==== World Sportscar Championship ====
1953 was the inaugural season of the World Sportscar Championship, a closed-wheel, closed-cockpit racing series now known as the World Endurance Championship. Ferrari was the winning manufacturer of five of the first six seasons of the championship, including the inaugural championship. Overall, Ferrari would go on to win thirteen manufacturer's titles through 1992, the final season of the series before it was revived in 2012; fellow Italian manufacturer Alfa Romeo would win its own titles in 1975 and 1977.

=== 1960s ===
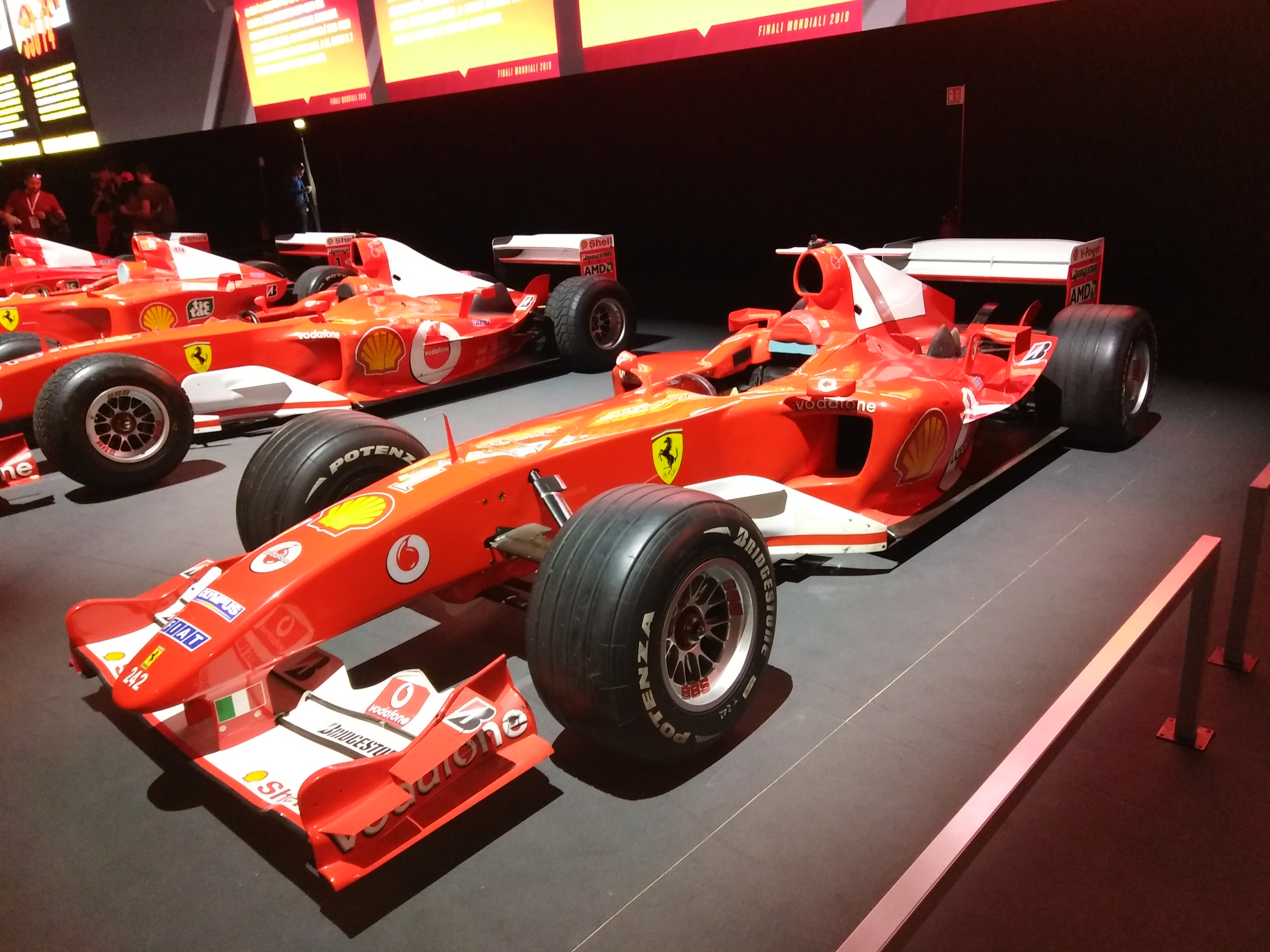
The Ferrari F2004 is arguably the most recognizable and dominant car in Formula 1 history, winning 15 of the 20 races it entered in the 2004 F1 season.

In 1961, four seasons after the establishment of the constructors' championship in Formula 1, Ferrari took home their first of sixteen of these titles. Meanwhile, in 1963, the European Touring Car Championship was established and many Italian drivers and teams found success in the early years of the sport. Over the course of the 1960s, Alfa Romeo and Abarth each one multiple titles in the second and first divisions of the sport, respectively, and four Italian drivers were also champions in the same divisions that decade.

== 1970s - 1990s ==
=== World Rally Championship ===
The FIA's World Rally Championship was established in 1973, and Italian constructors dominated the first decade of the sport. Fiat and Lancia won a combined five of the seven championships that took place in the 1970s, and Italian Sandro Munari was the sport's first drivers' champion in 1977.

== The modern era 2000s - present ==
=== Ferrari's F1 dominance ===
The most successful period in Scuderia Ferrari's history occurred in the early 2000s, when the team won five consecutive and six out of eight constructors' championships from 2000 through 2008. Ferrari have not won a driver's championship since 2007, or a constructor's championship since 2008.
