= Volkswagen Group A platform =

Overview
- Manufacturer: Volkswagen Group
- Production: 1974–present

Body and chassis
- Layout: Transversely mounted front-engine, front-wheel-drive; Transversely mounted front-engine, all-wheel-drive
- Related: Volkswagen Group A0 platform

Chronology
- Predecessor: Volkswagen Beetle
- Successor: Volkswagen Group MQB platform (for PQ35/46 Platform)

The Volkswagen Group A platform is an automobile platform used for compact cars of the Volkswagen Group.

The first version debuted in 1974 and was originally based on the engineering concept of the Volkswagen Golf Mk1, and is applicable to either front- or four-wheel drive vehicles, using only front-mounted transverse engines.

Volkswagens based on this platform have been colloquially referred to by generation number, e.g. the first Golf version (A1) is referred to as a "Mark 1 Golf". Often each generation is designated by substituting "Mark" for "A," but this can be misleading. For example, the Mk1 and Mk2 Scirocco are both based on the A1 platform. Volkswagen has never used the Mark or Mk designations.

Volkswagen Group introduced a new alphanumeric nomenclature for vehicle platforms for the fourth generation. Under Volkswagen's revised platform naming system, the "A4" platform became the PQ34 platform, and what would have been called the A5 platform was called the PQ35 platform.

The platform code is composed as follows:

- A letter, P, indicating a passenger car platform
- A letter indicating the configuration of the engine:
  - Q indicates a transverse engine (Quer in German)
- A digit indicating the platform size or class:
  - 3 corresponds to compact cars
- A digit indicating the generation or evolution

The A platform has been superseded by the MQB platform for new models, with the exception of a few models only sold in certain markets.

== A1 ==
The A1 platform debuted on the Mk1 Golf on its launch in 1974, and continued into the early 1990s, when the last remaining models using the platform - the Scirocco, Cabriolet, and Caddy - were discontinued.

A1 platform cars (Typ numbers in brackets):

- Volkswagen Golf Mk1 (17)
- Volkswagen Golf Cabriolet (155)
- Volkswagen Jetta Mk1 (16)
- Volkswagen Caddy Mk1 (14)
- Volkswagen Scirocco Mk1 & Mk2 (53/53B)
- Volkswagen Citi Golf
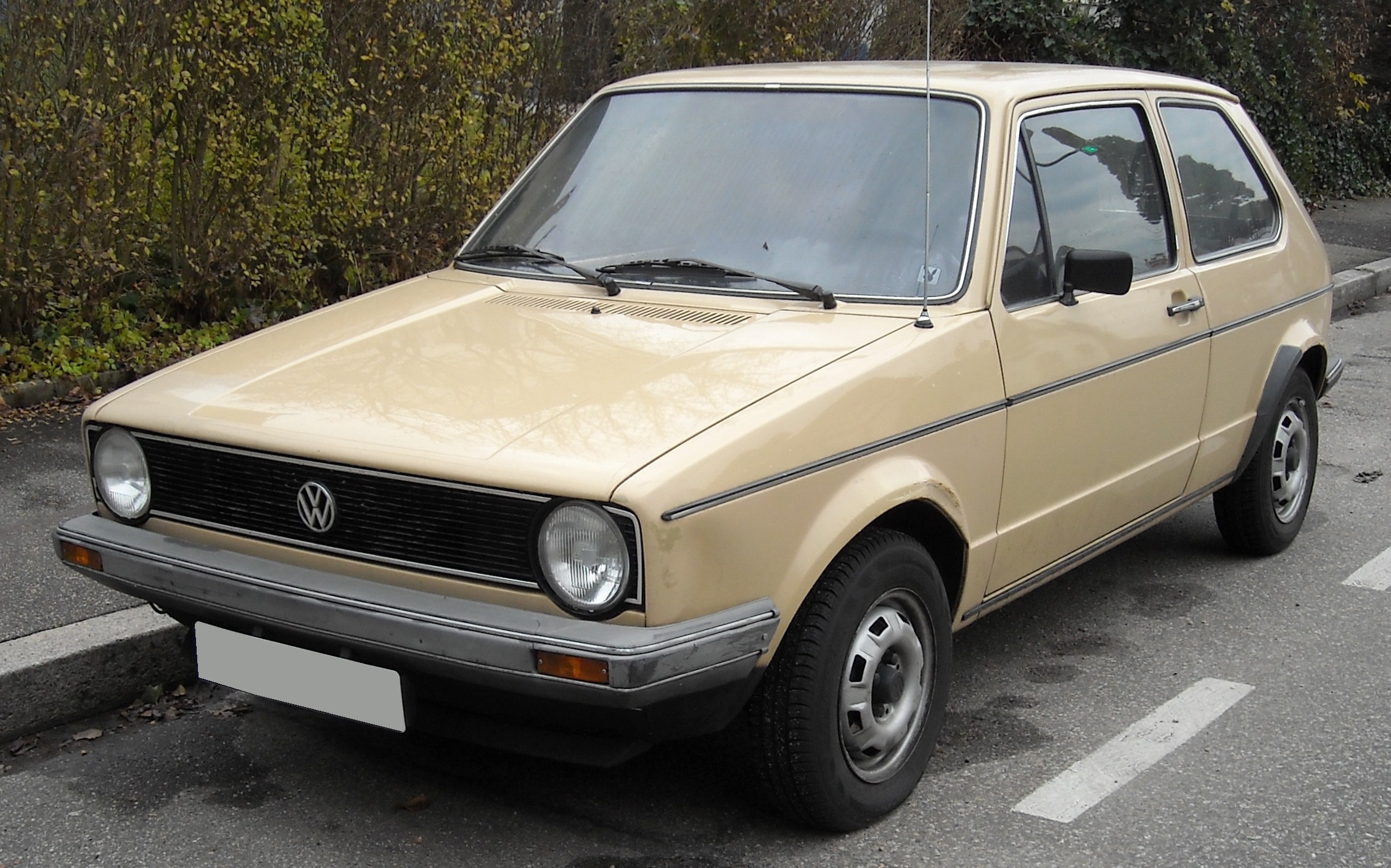
Volkswagen Golf Mk1

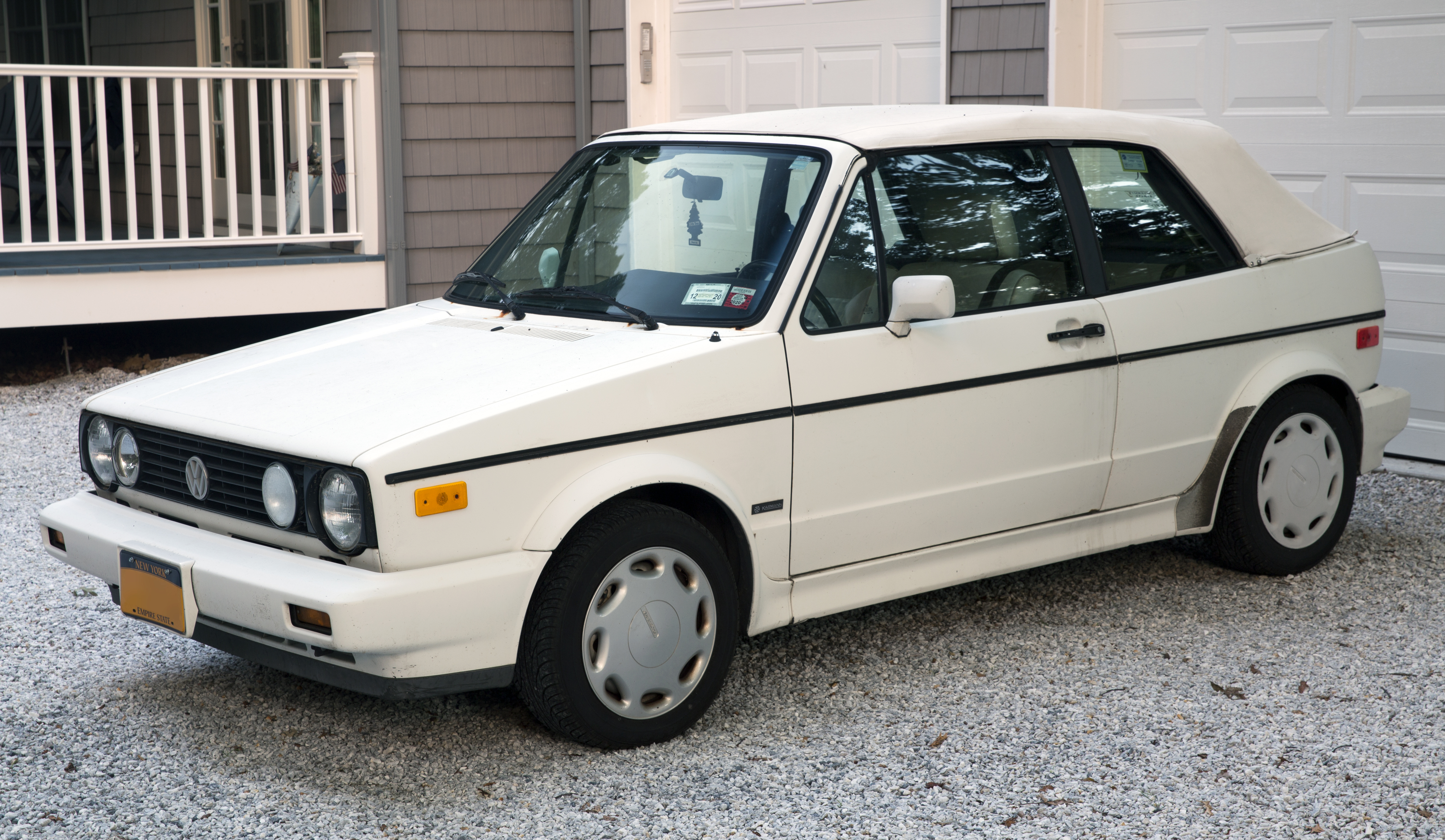
Volkswagen Golf Cabriolet

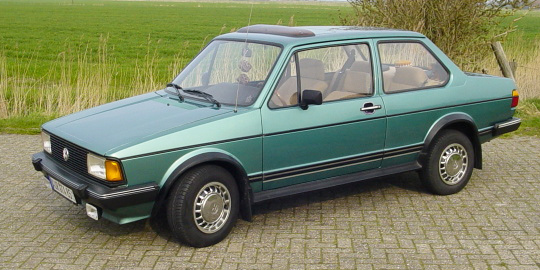
Volkswagen Jetta (A1)

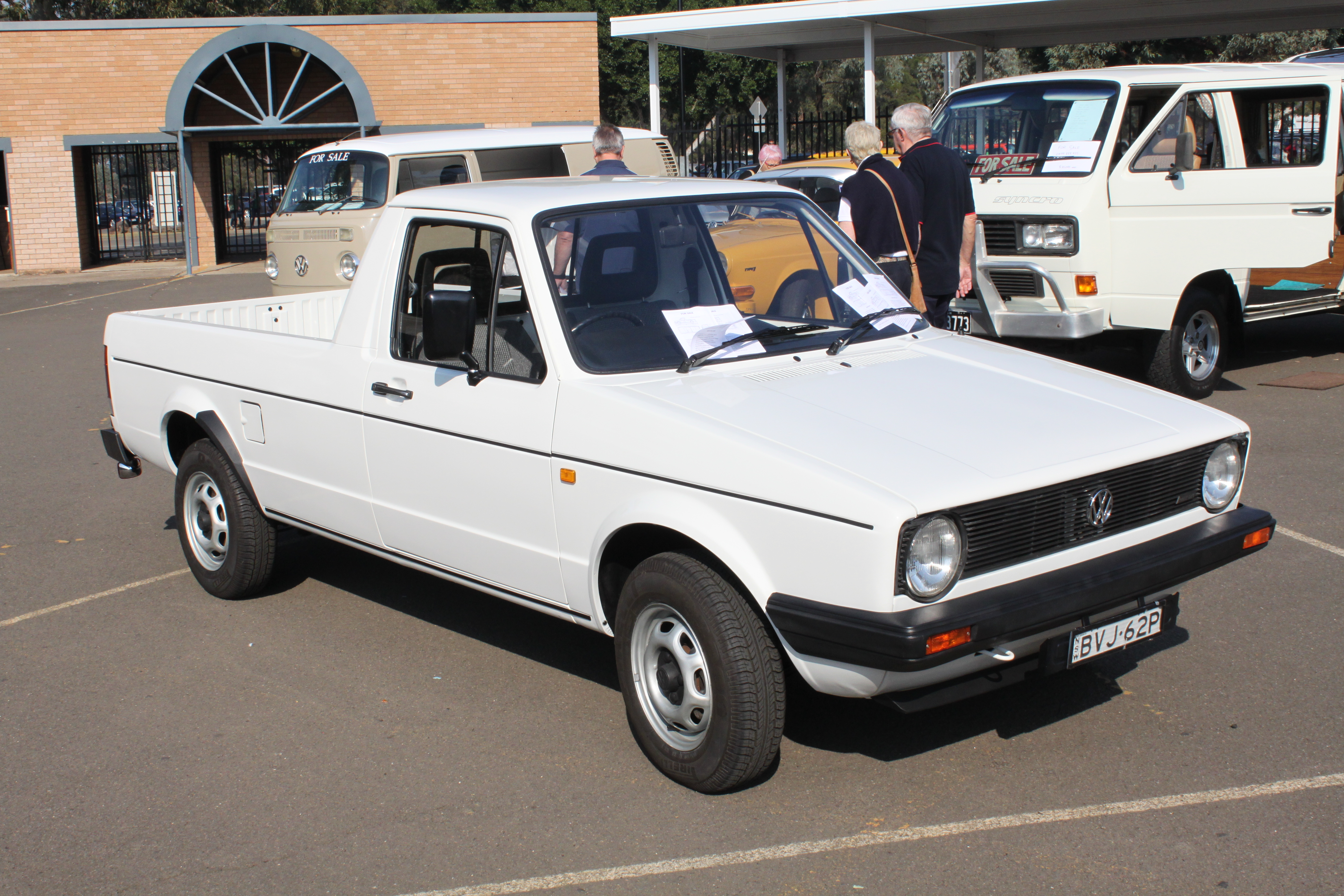
Volkswagen Caddy MK1

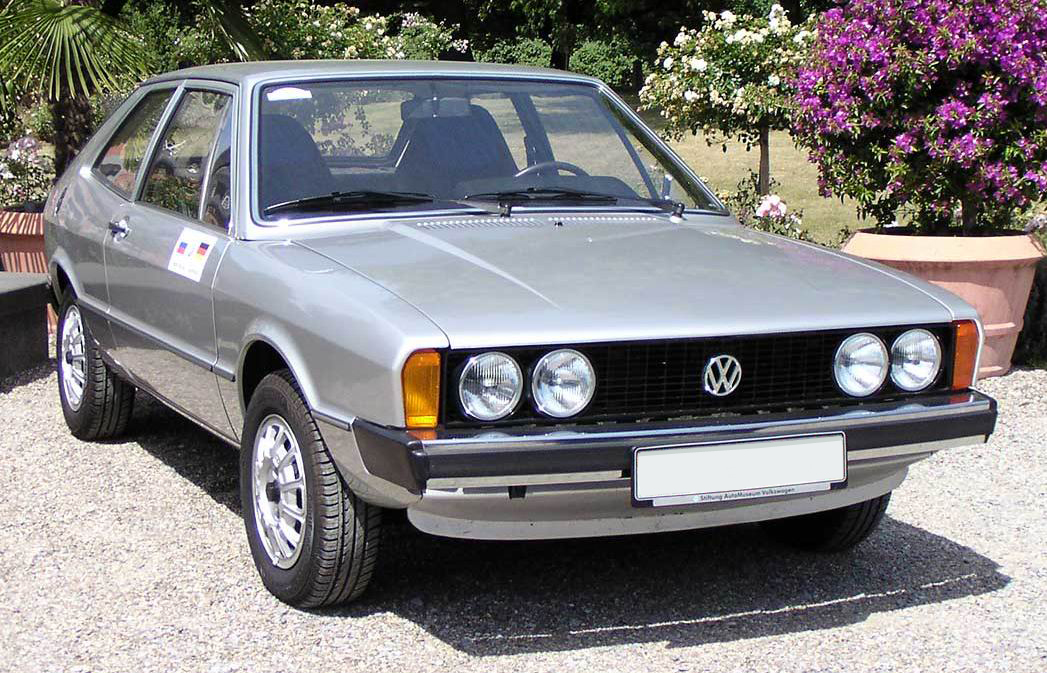
Volkswagen Scirocco Mk1

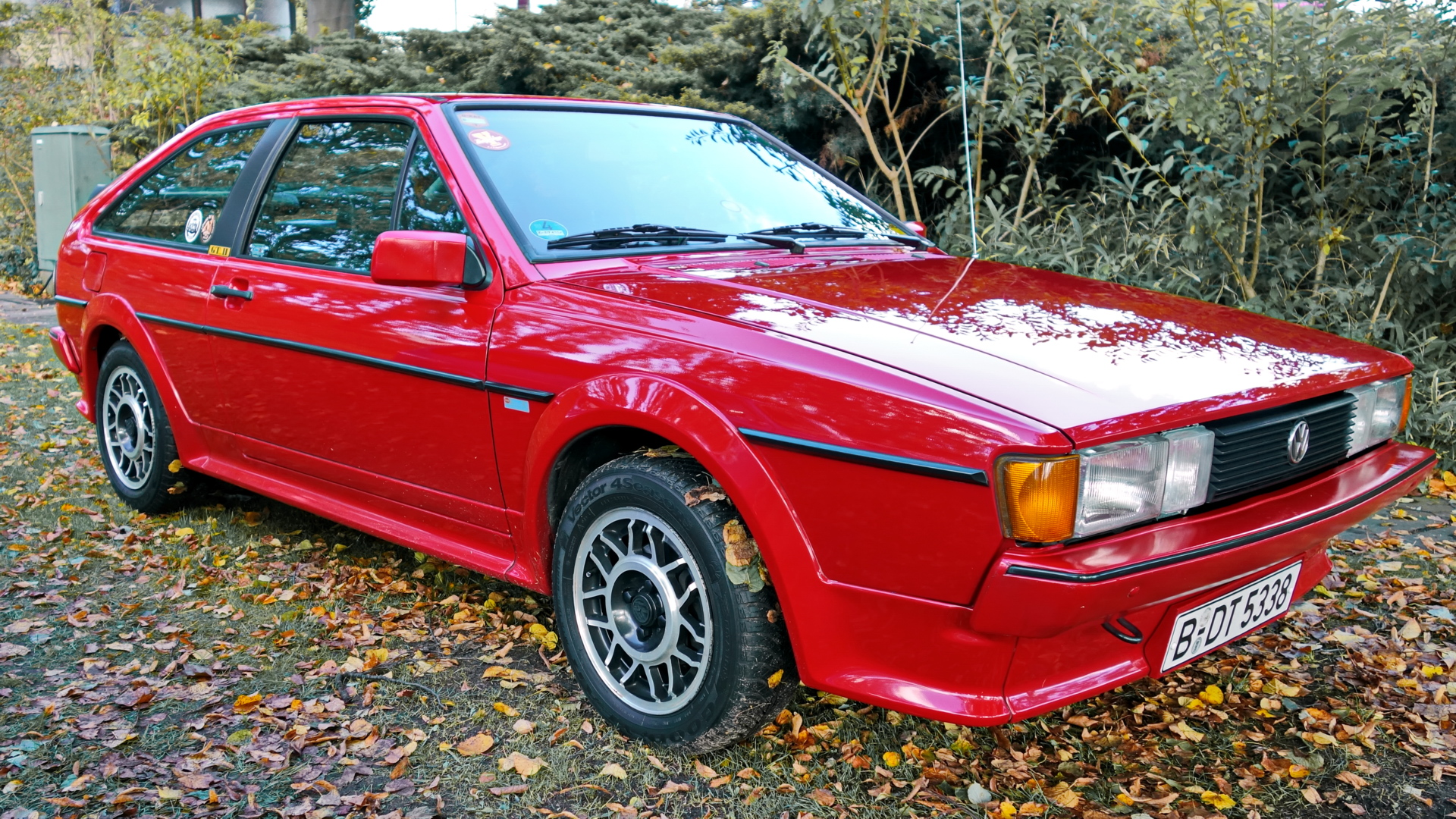
Volkswagen Scirocco Mk2

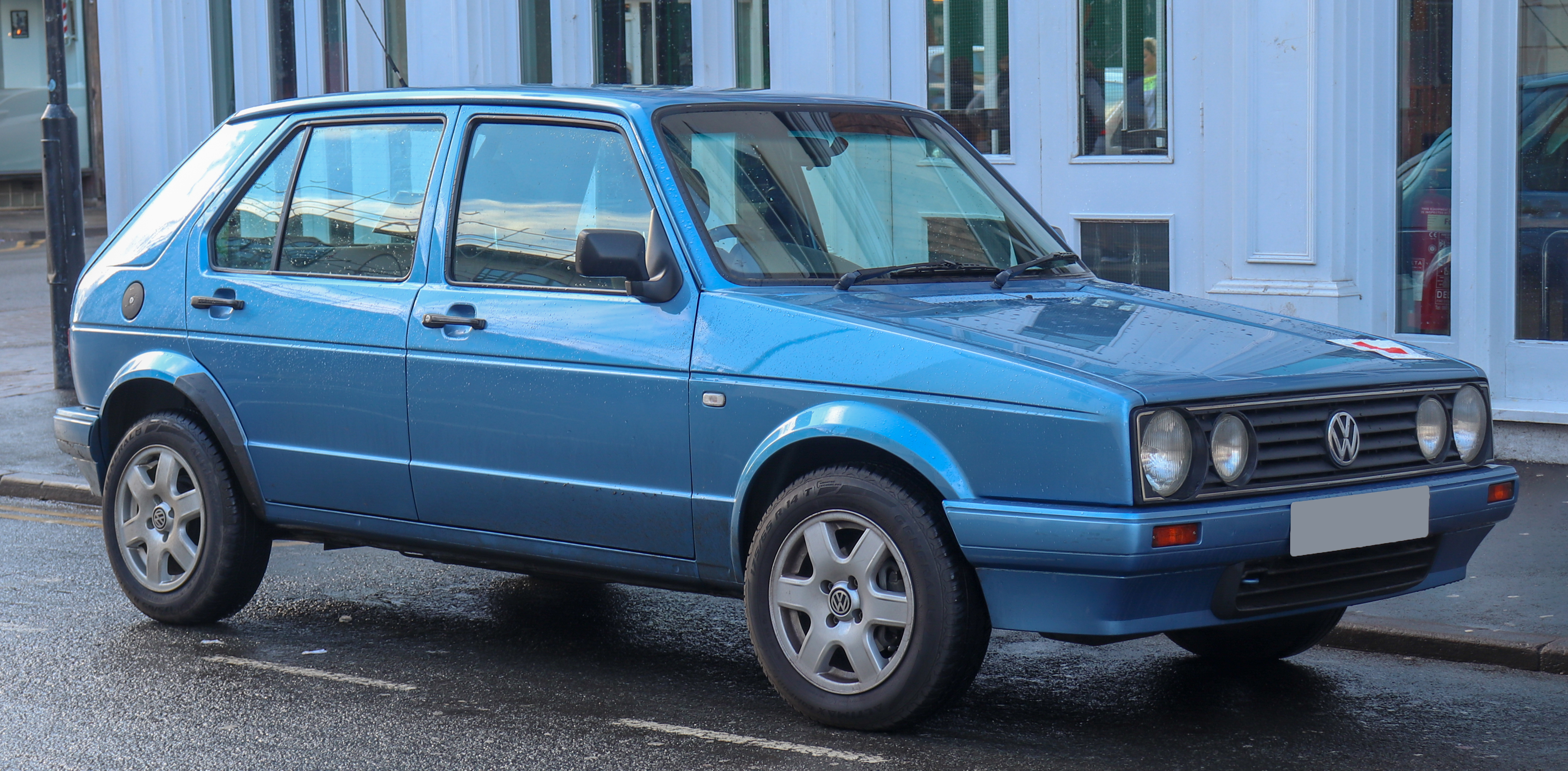
Volkswagen Citi Golf

== A2 ==
The A2 platform debuted in 1983 on the Mk2 Golf, and lasted until 1998, when the original SEAT Toledo (the first Volkswagen-developed SEAT following the Spanish company's takeover by Volkswagen) was replaced.

The Volkswagen Passat B3 was based on a stretched A2 platform. The Volkswagen Corrado, while being an A2 platform car, uses some components from the A3 platform, notably the rear suspension assembly and some front suspension parts.

A2 platform cars (Typ numbers in brackets):

- Volkswagen Corrado (53I)
- Volkswagen Golf Mk2 (19E)
- Volkswagen Jetta II (1G)
- SEAT Toledo Mk1 (1L)
- Chery A11 and Chery A15
- Vortex Corda
- Volkswagen Jetta King
- Volkswagen Jetta Pioneer
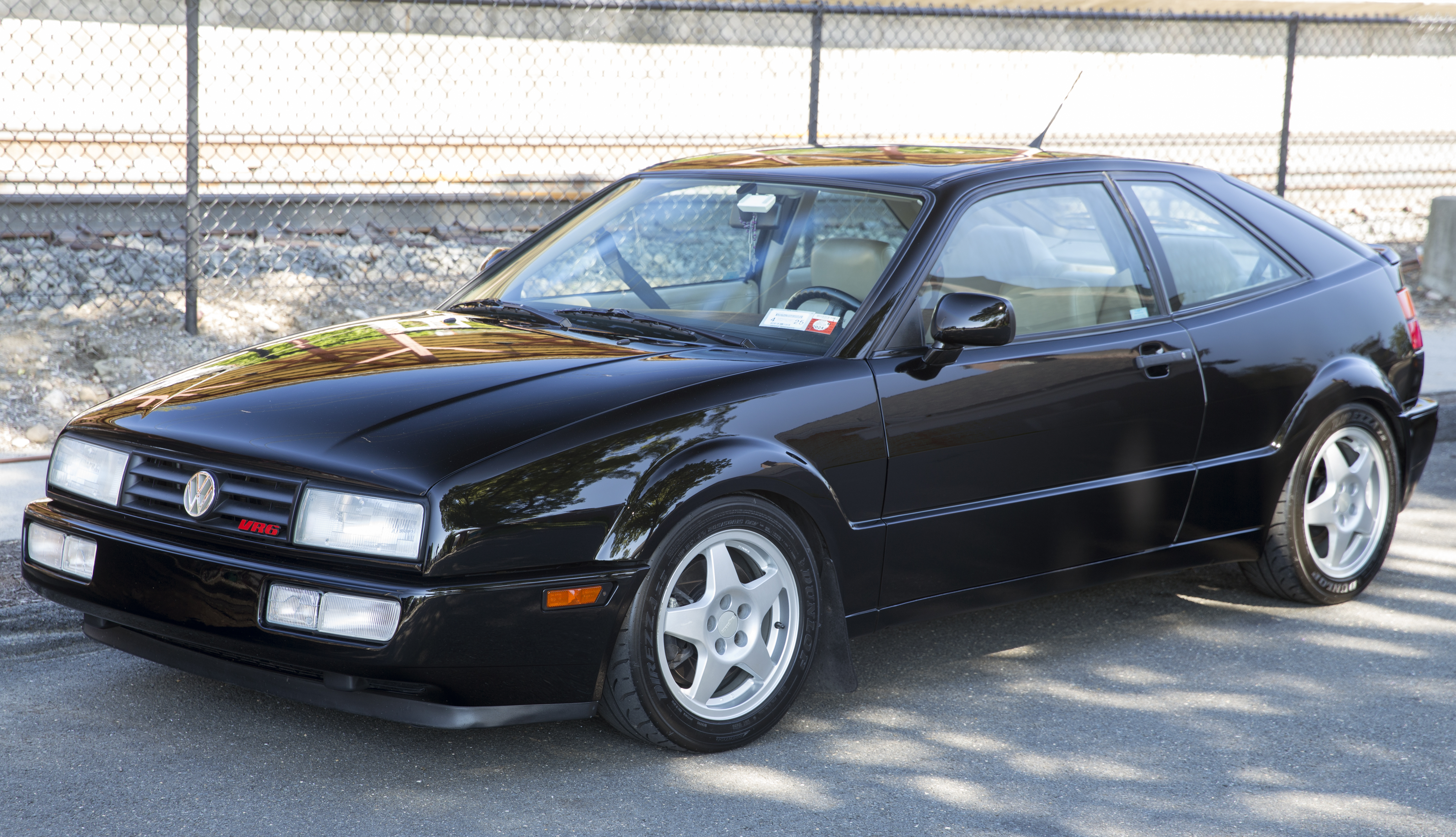
Volkswagen Corrado

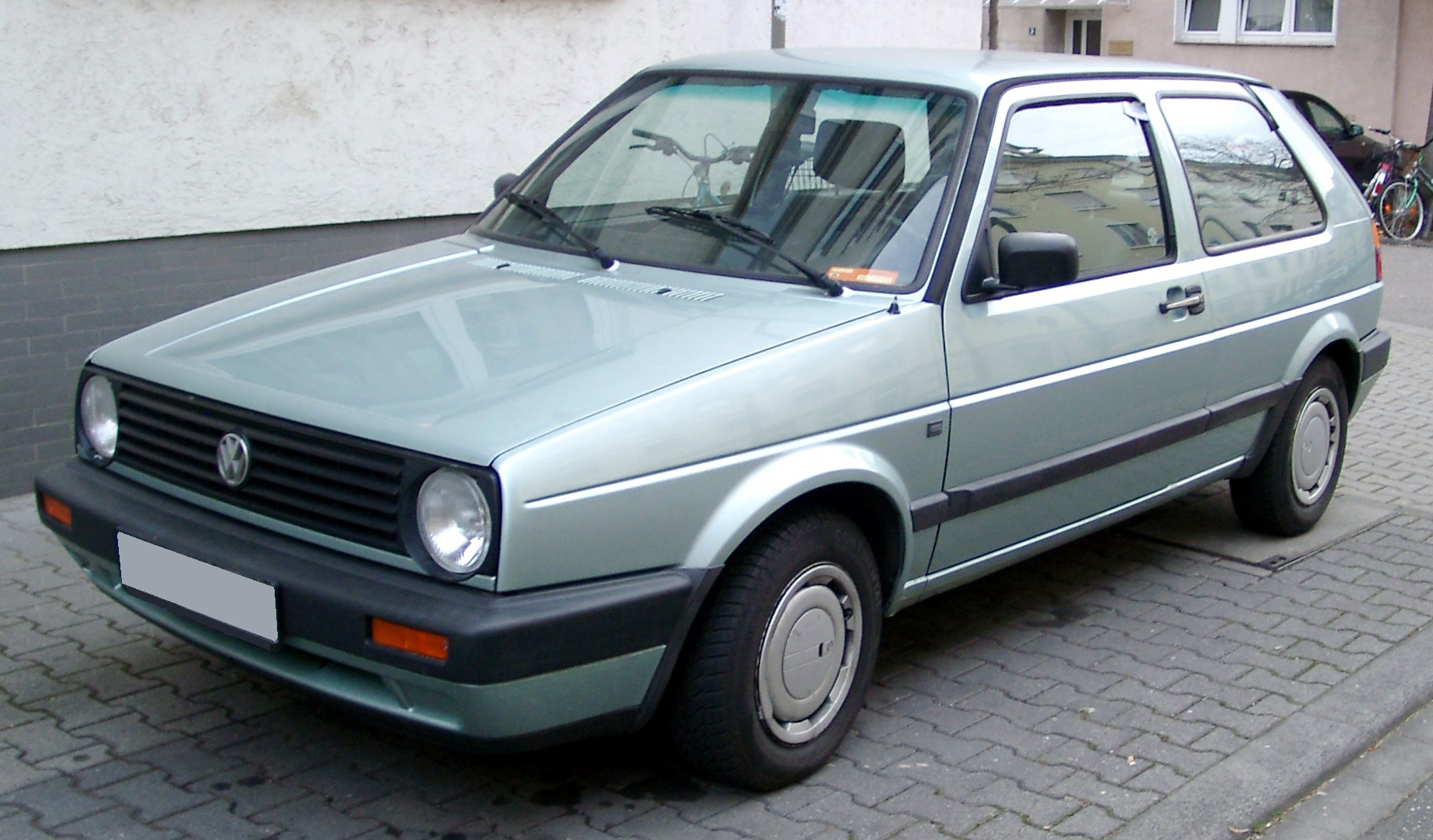
Volkswagen Golf Mk2

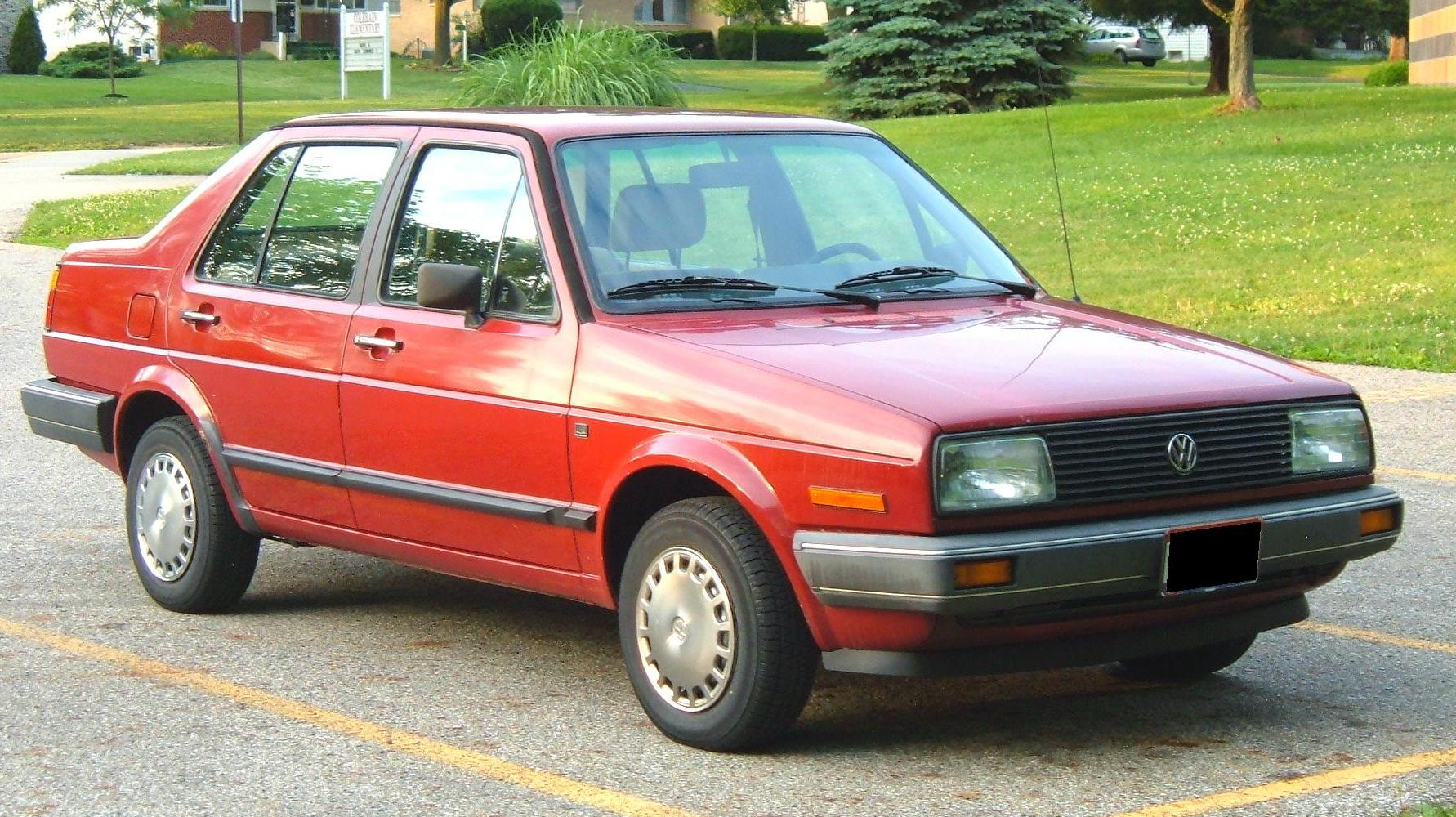
Volkswagen Jetta (A2)

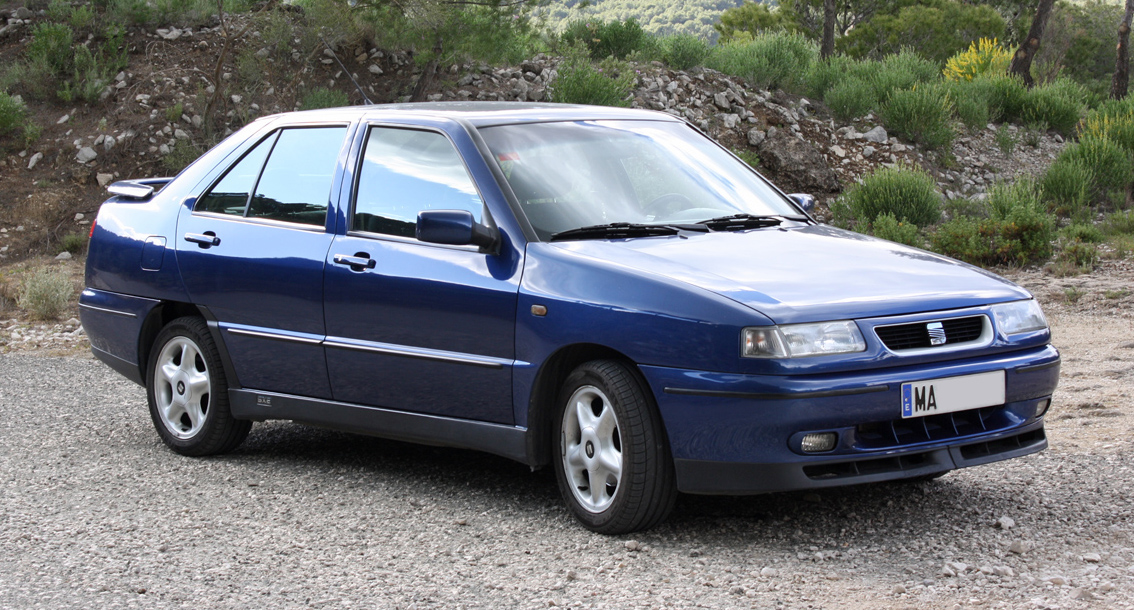
SEAT Toledo Mk1

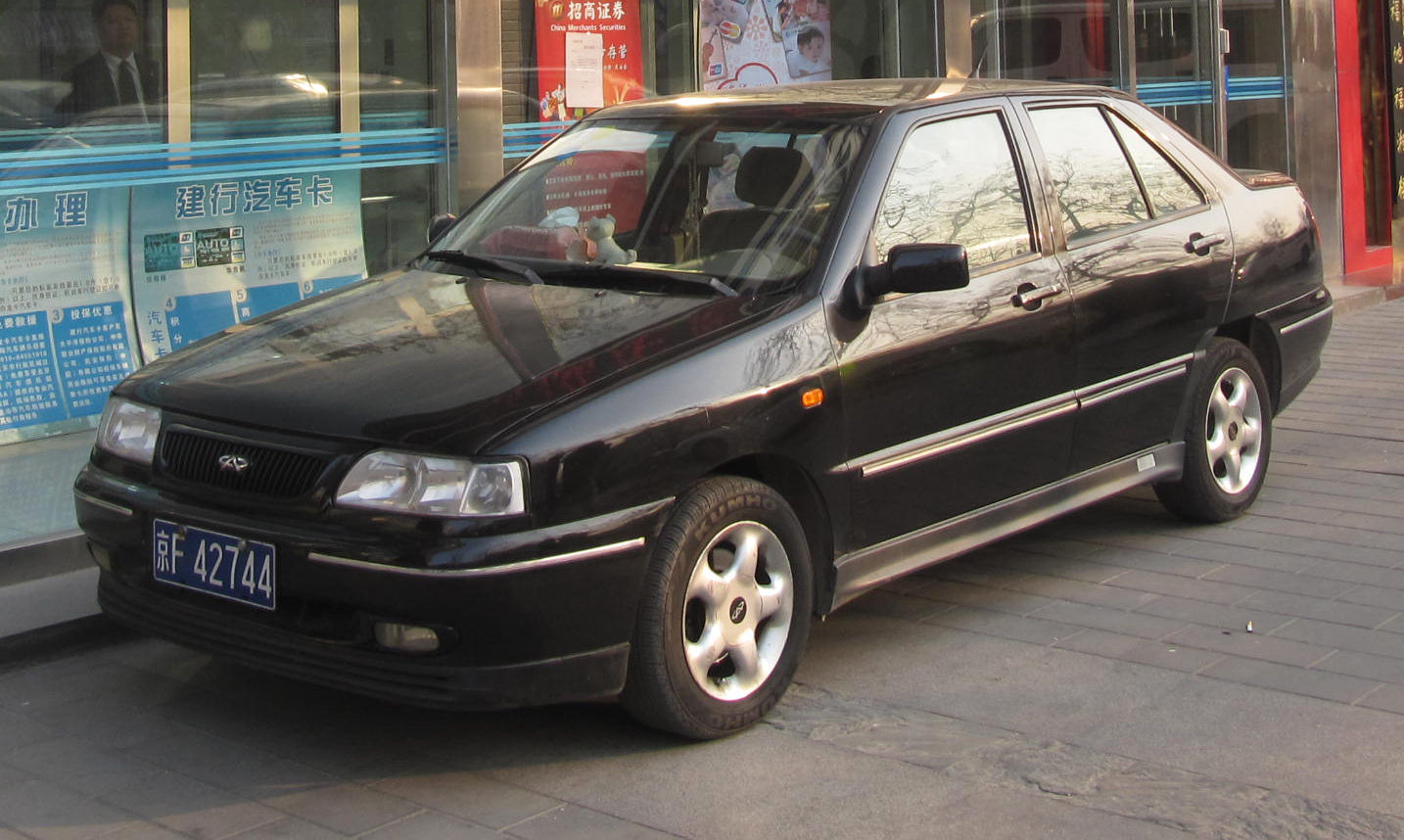
Chery A11

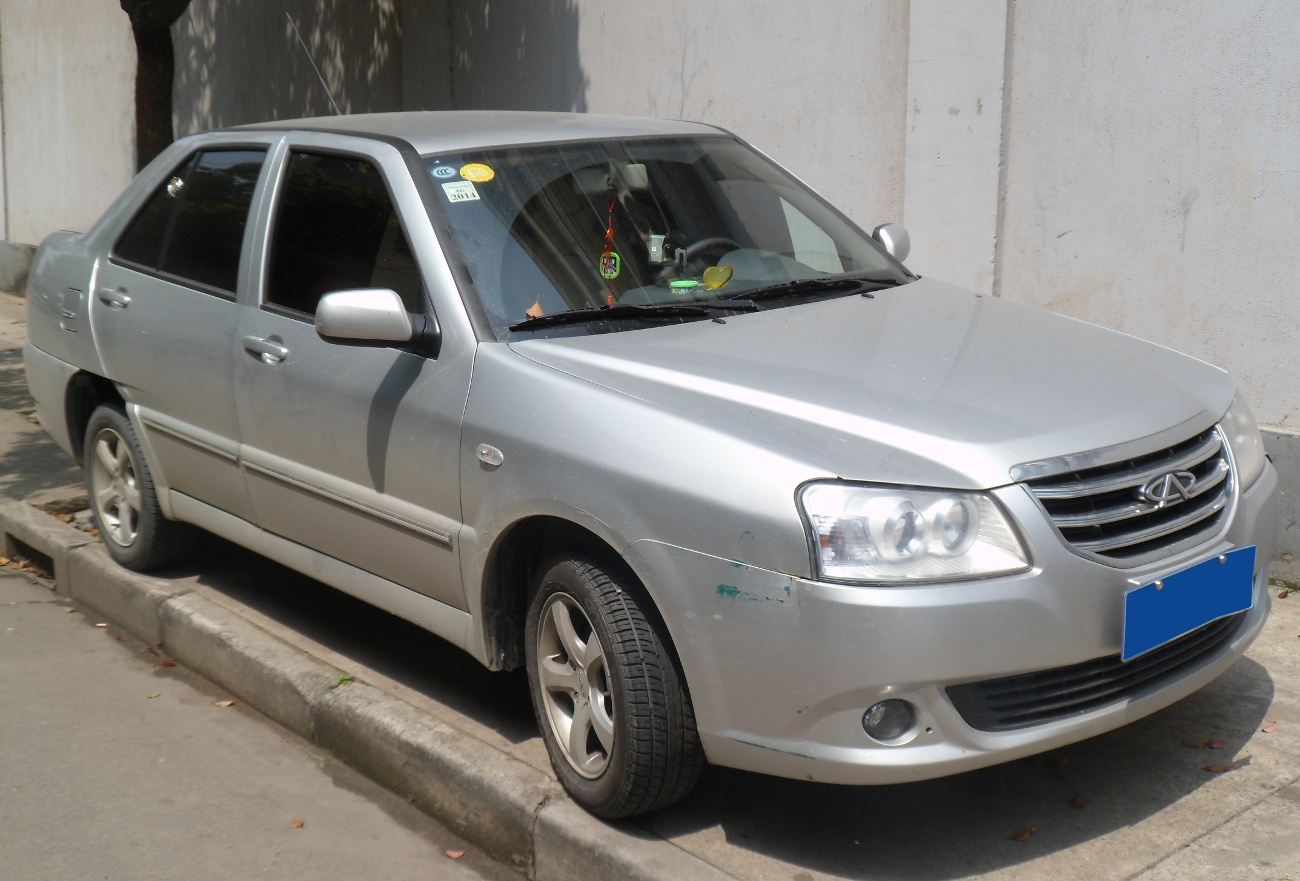
Chery A15

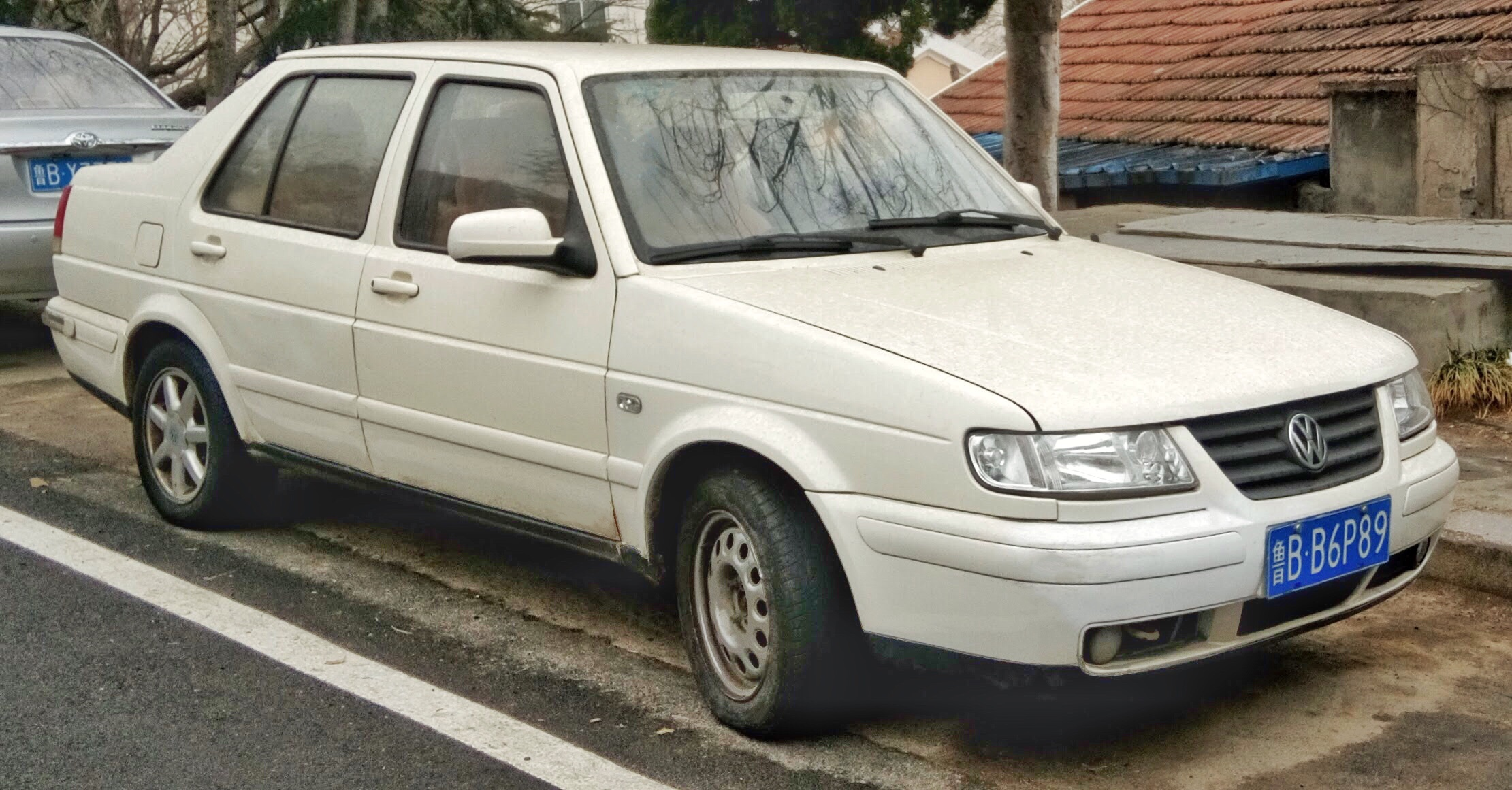
Volkswagen Jetta King

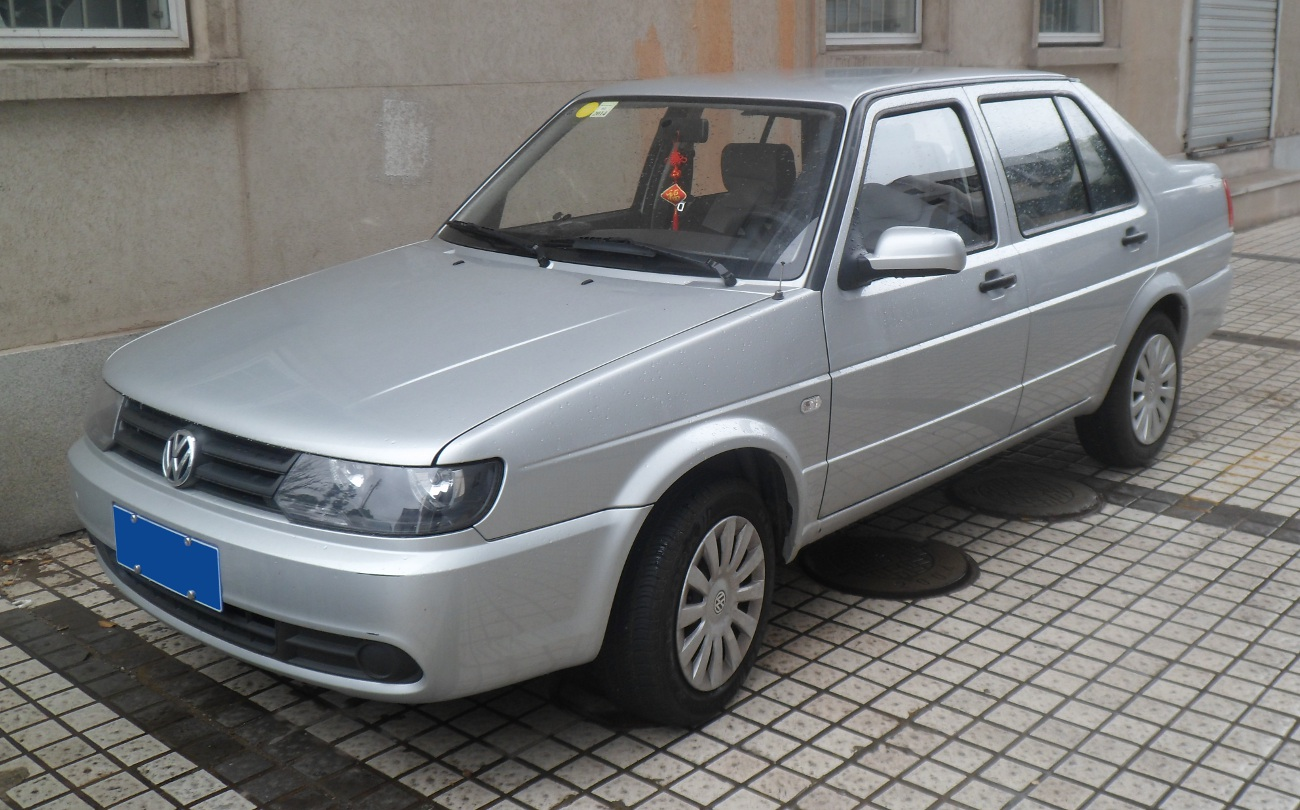
Volkswagen Jetta Pioneer

== A3 ==
The A3 platform was only used for two models - the Mk3 Golf, launched in 1991, and its saloon equivalent, the Vento, launched in early 1992.

A3 platform cars (Typ numbers in brackets):

- Volkswagen Golf Mk3 (1E)
- Volkswagen Vento/Jetta III (1H)
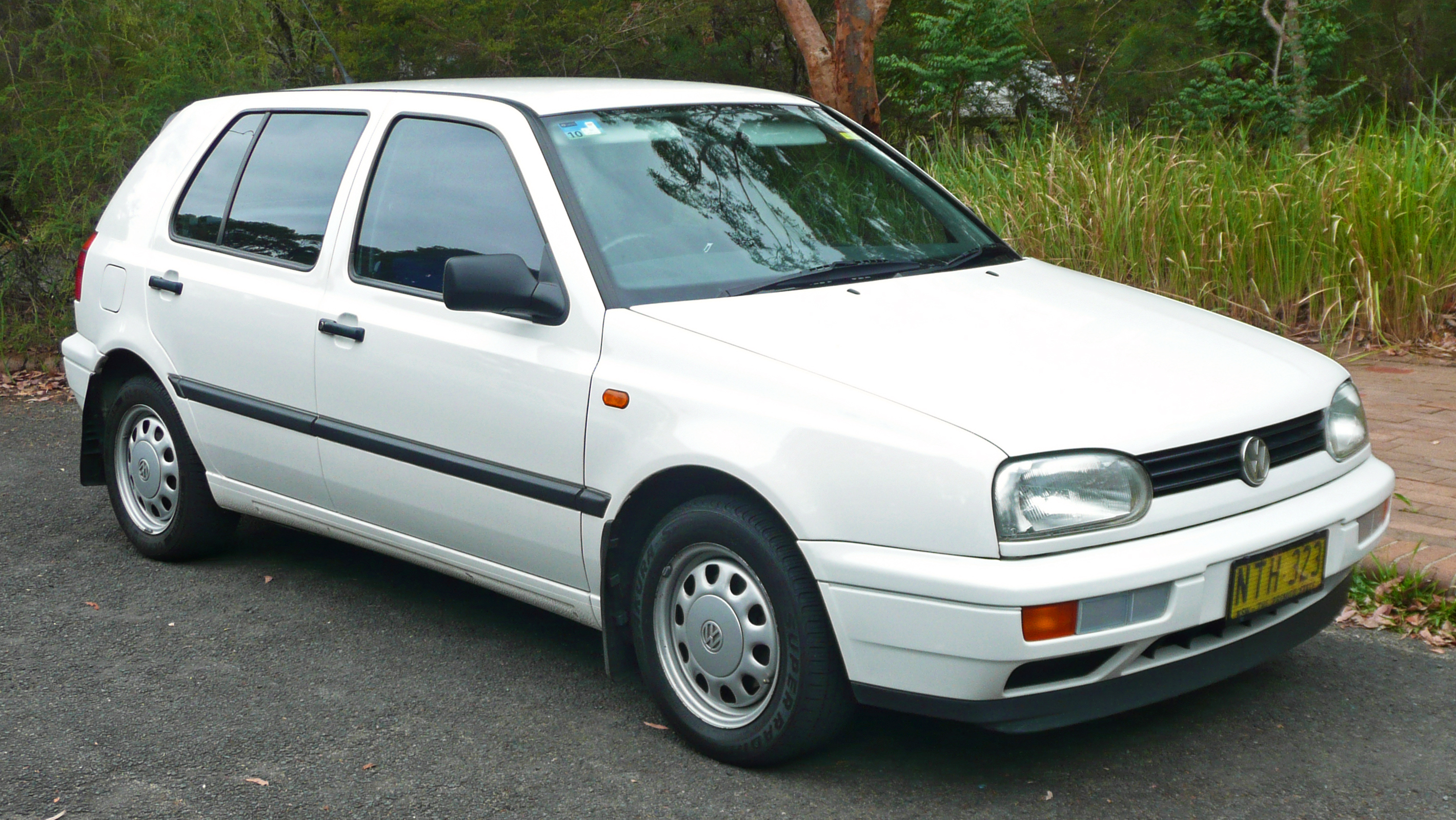
Volkswagen Golf Mk3

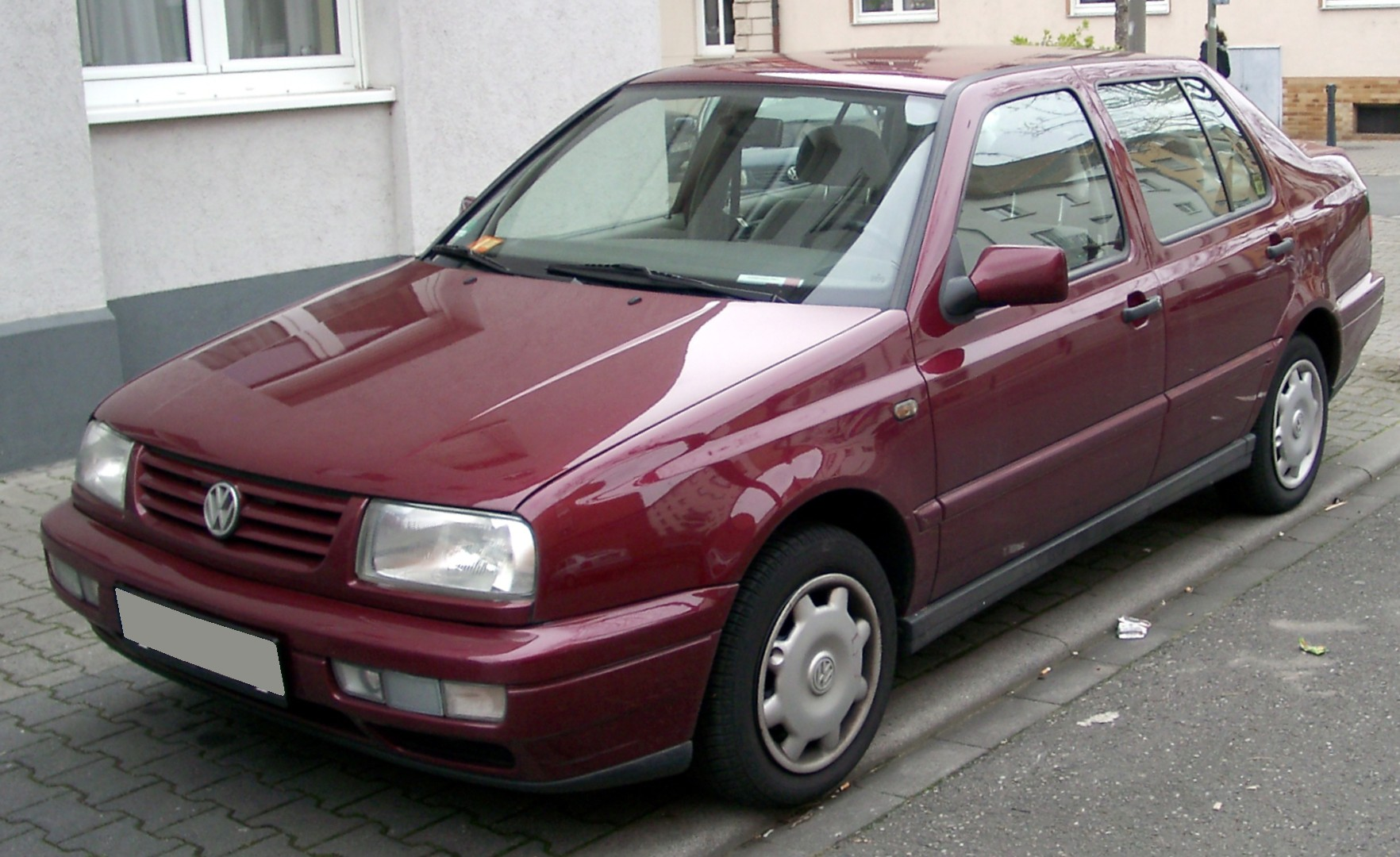
Volkswagen Vento (A3)

The smaller A03 platform, used in the Polo (6N) is based on the A3 platform as well, and shares many components.

SEAT Ibiza (6K) and derived models, uses components of both A3 and A03 platforms.

== PQ34 (A4) ==
The A4 platform (PQ34 under the revised scheme) debuted on the Audi A3 in 1996 and went on to be used for many different models over the next two decades.

PQ34 platform cars (Typ numbers in brackets):

- Audi A3 Mk1 (8L)
- Audi TT Mk1 (8N)
- Volkswagen Golf Mk4 (1J)
- Volkswagen Bora/Jetta (1J/9M)
- Volkswagen Lavida (18)
- Volkswagen New Beetle (1C/1Y/9C)
- SEAT León Mk1 (1M)
- SEAT Toledo Mk2 (1M)
- Škoda Octavia Mk1 (1U)
- Škoda Kamiq (China)
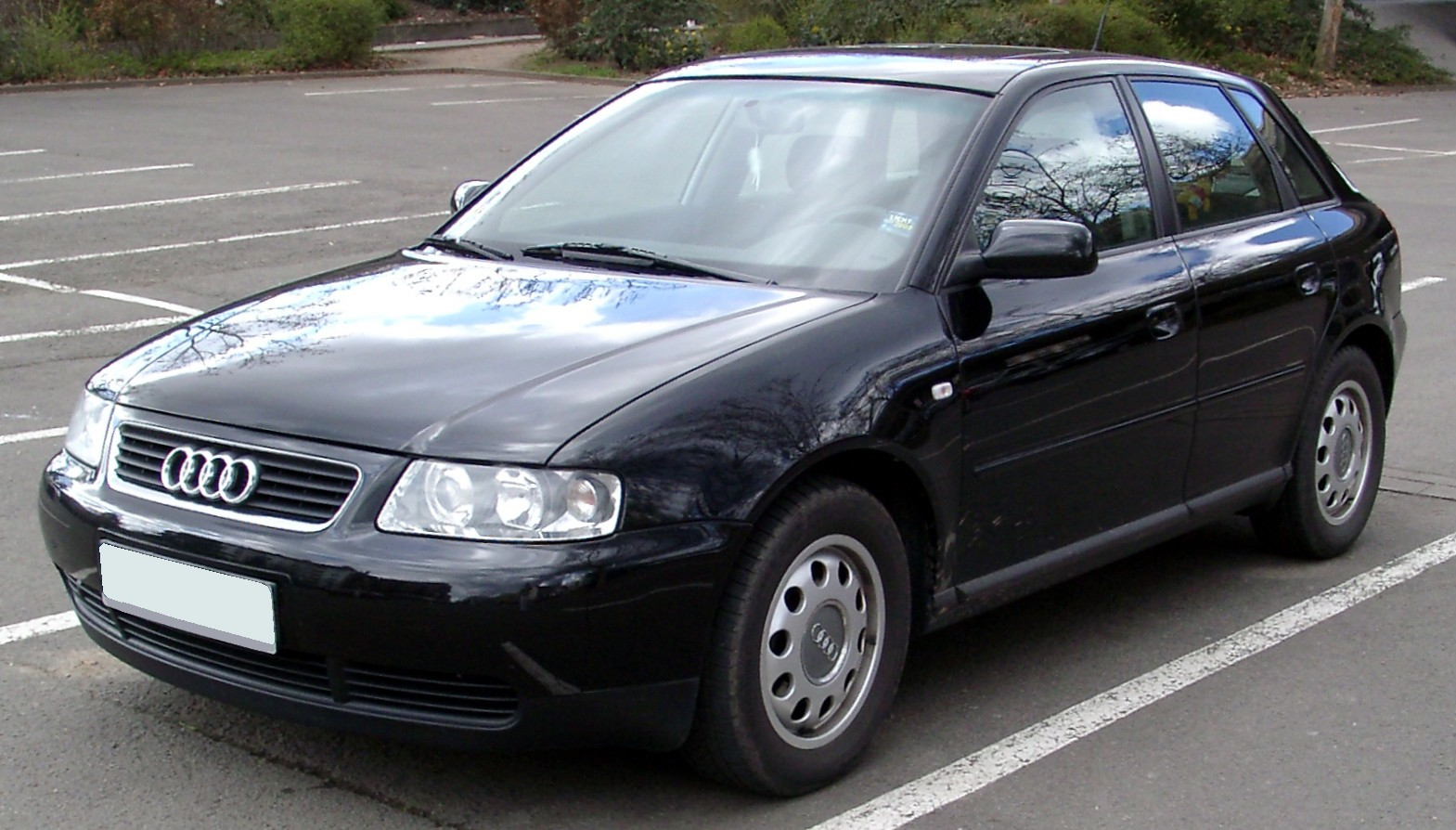
Audi A3 Mk1

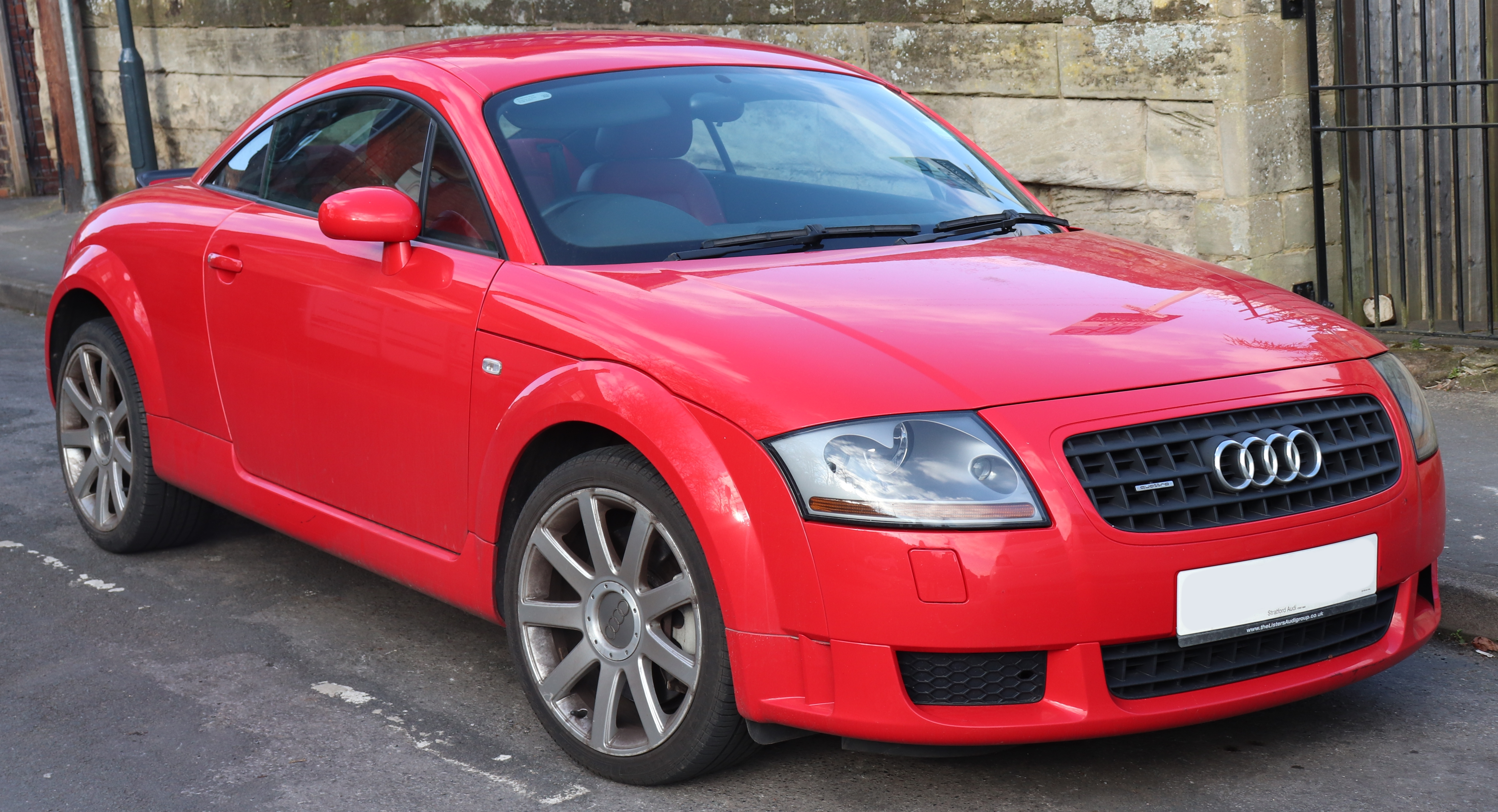
Audi TT Mk1

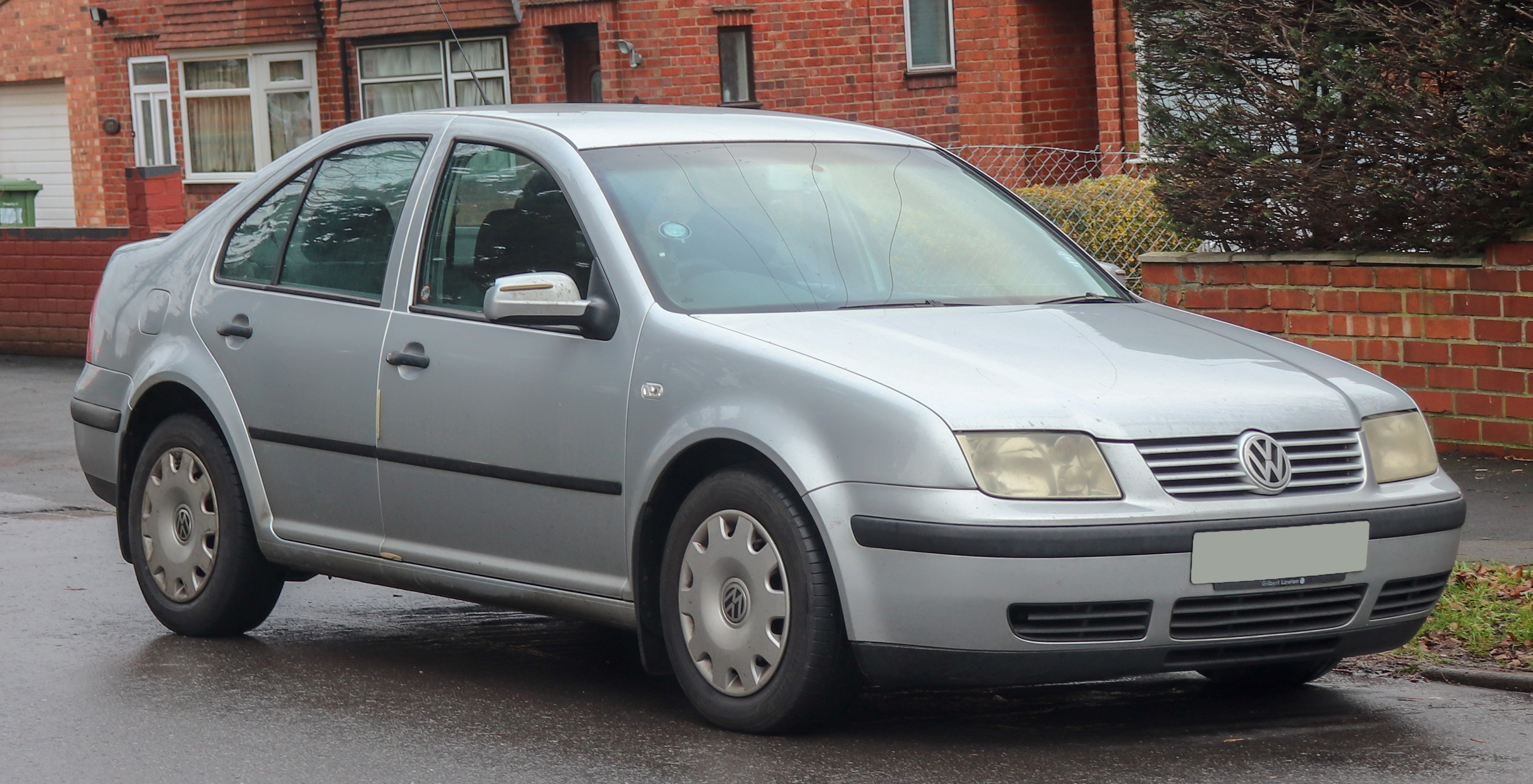
Volkswagen Bora

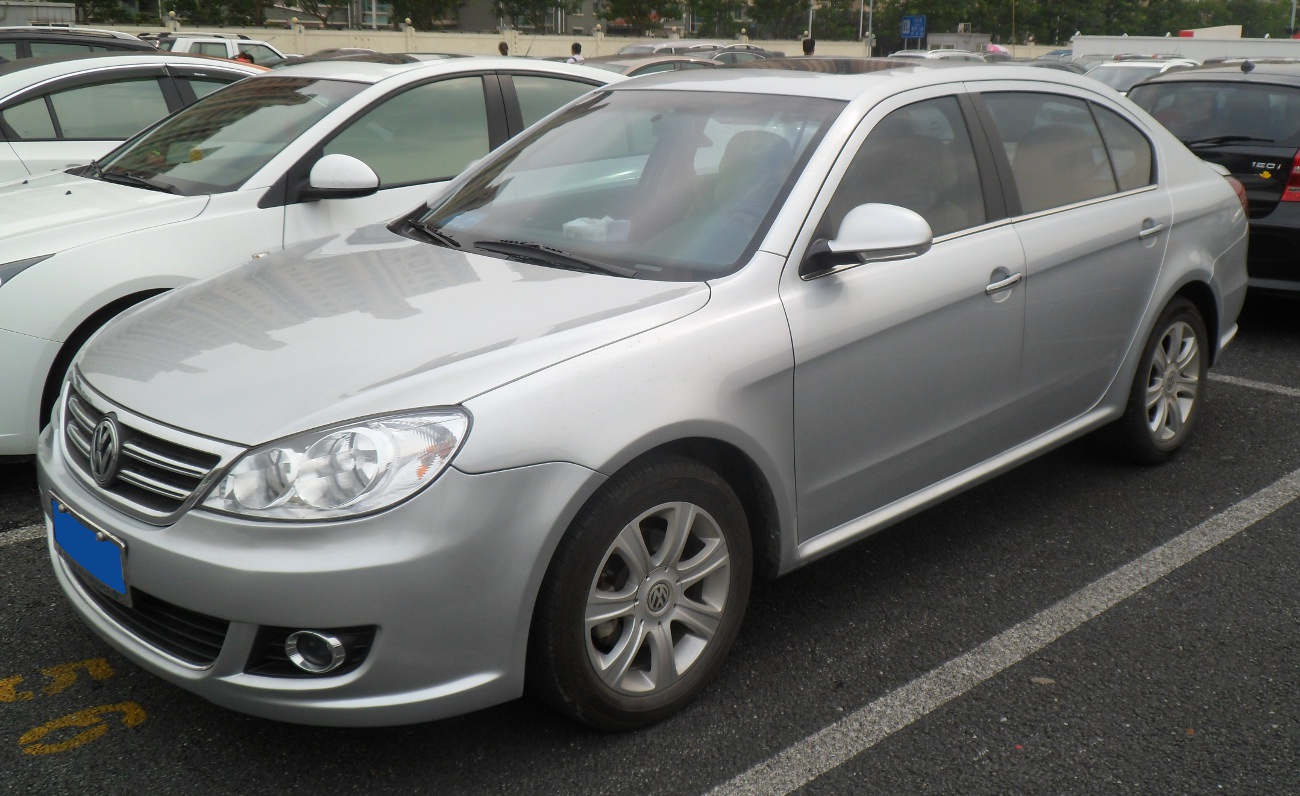
Volkswagen Lavida

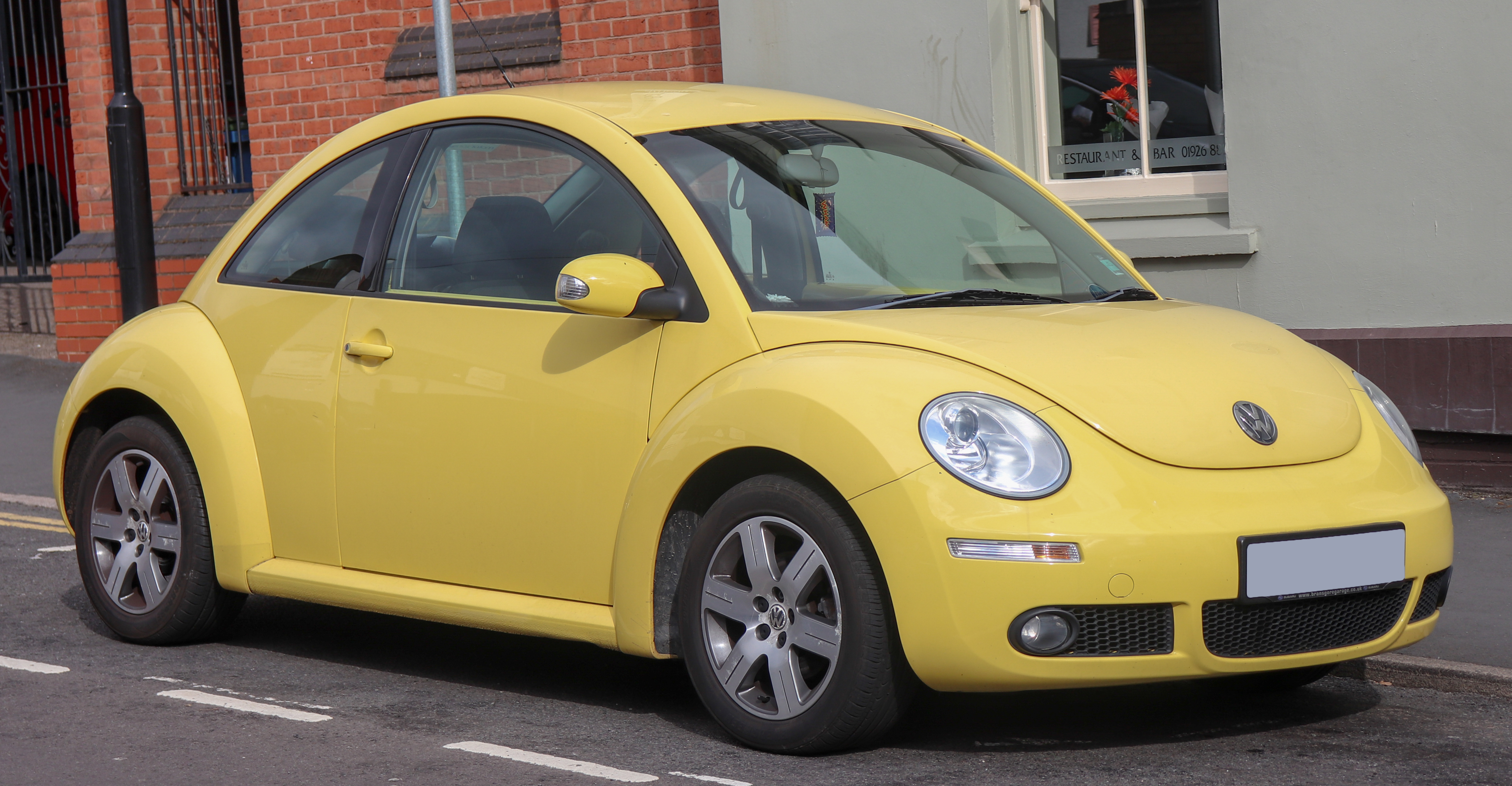
Volkswagen New Beetle

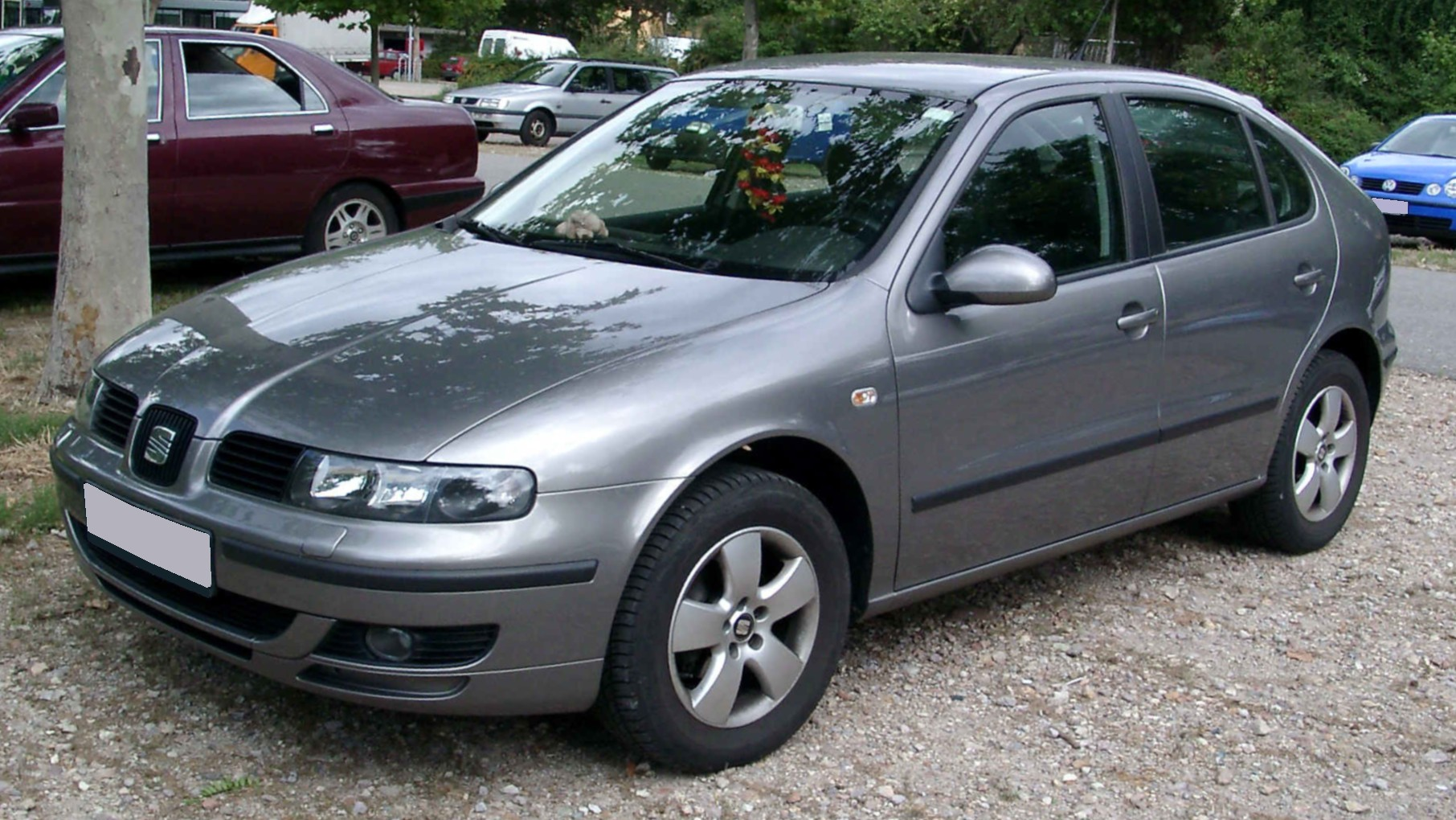
SEAT León Mk1

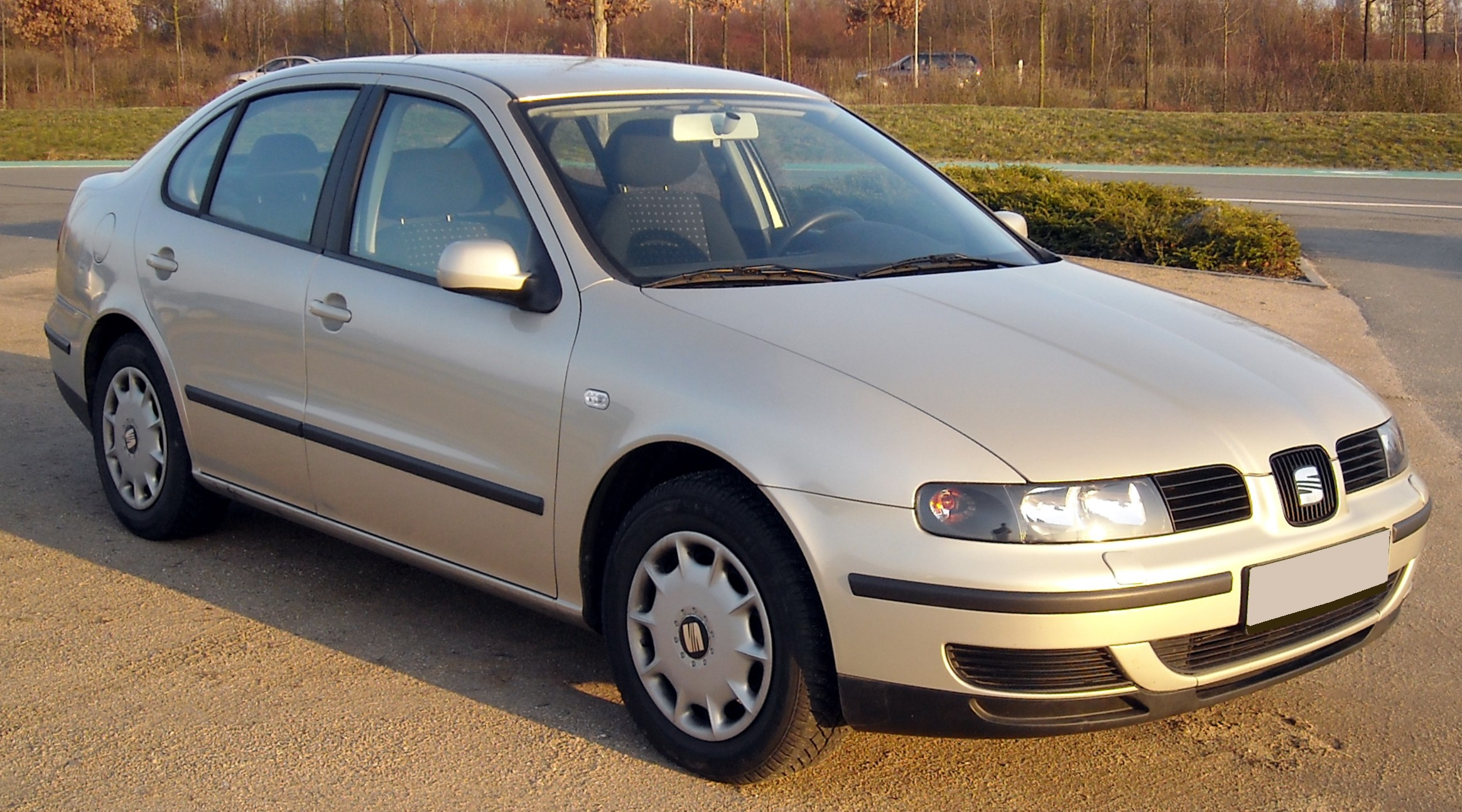
SEAT Toledo Mk2

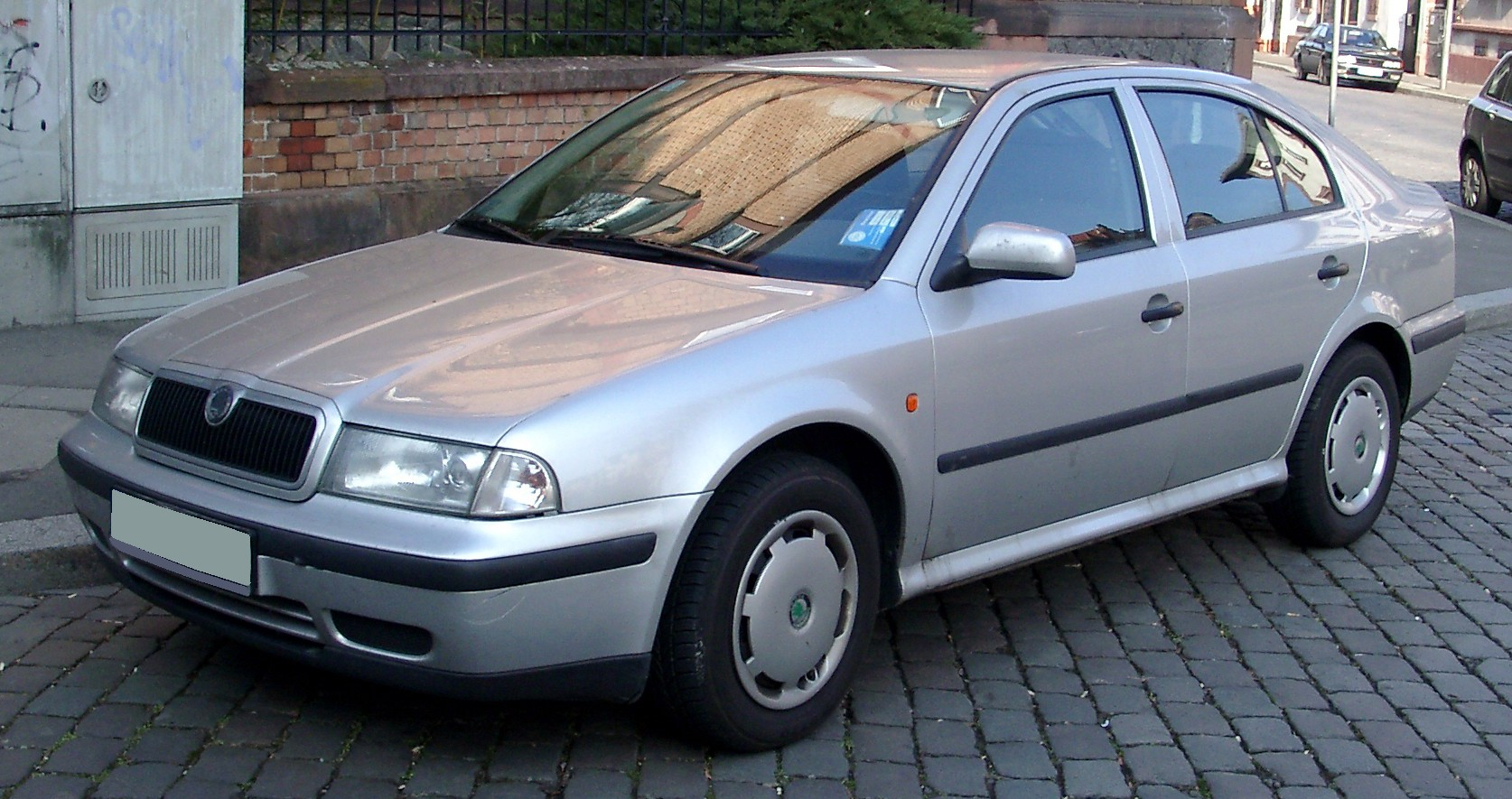
Škoda Octavia Mk1

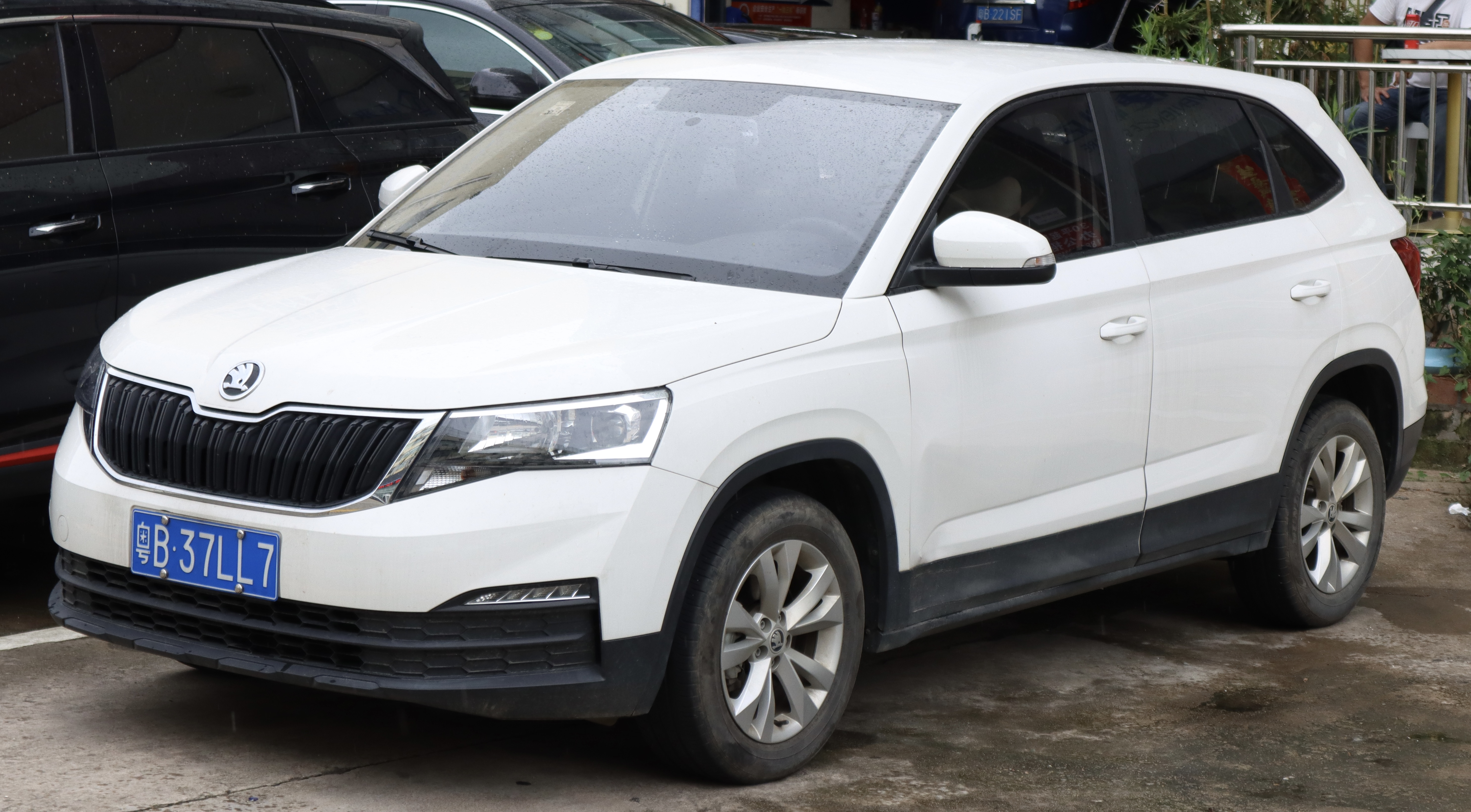
Škoda Kamiq (China)

== PQ35 (A5) ==
The PQ35 platform was designed to be more modular than previous A platforms. For the first time, a fully independent suspension was used in the rear of all A platform vehicles (except some variants of the Mk6 Jetta and A5 Beetle that reverted to a torsion beam rear suspension).

=== PQ35 platform cars ===
(Type numbers in brackets):

- Audi A3 Mk2 (8P)
- Audi TT Mk2 (8J)
- Audi Q3 Mk1 (8U)
- SEAT León Mk2 (1P)
- SEAT Toledo Mk3 (5P)
- SEAT Altea (5P)
- Škoda Octavia Mk2 (1Z)
- Škoda Yeti (5L)
- Volkswagen Touran (1T)
- Volkswagen Caddy Mk3 (2K)
- Volkswagen Golf Mk5 (1K)
- Volkswagen Golf Mk6 (5K)
- Volkswagen Golf Plus
- Volkswagen Jetta Mk5 (1K)
- Volkswagen Scirocco Mk3 (13)
- Volkswagen Jetta Mk6 (1K)
- Volkswagen Beetle (A5) (16)
- Volkswagen Eos (1F)
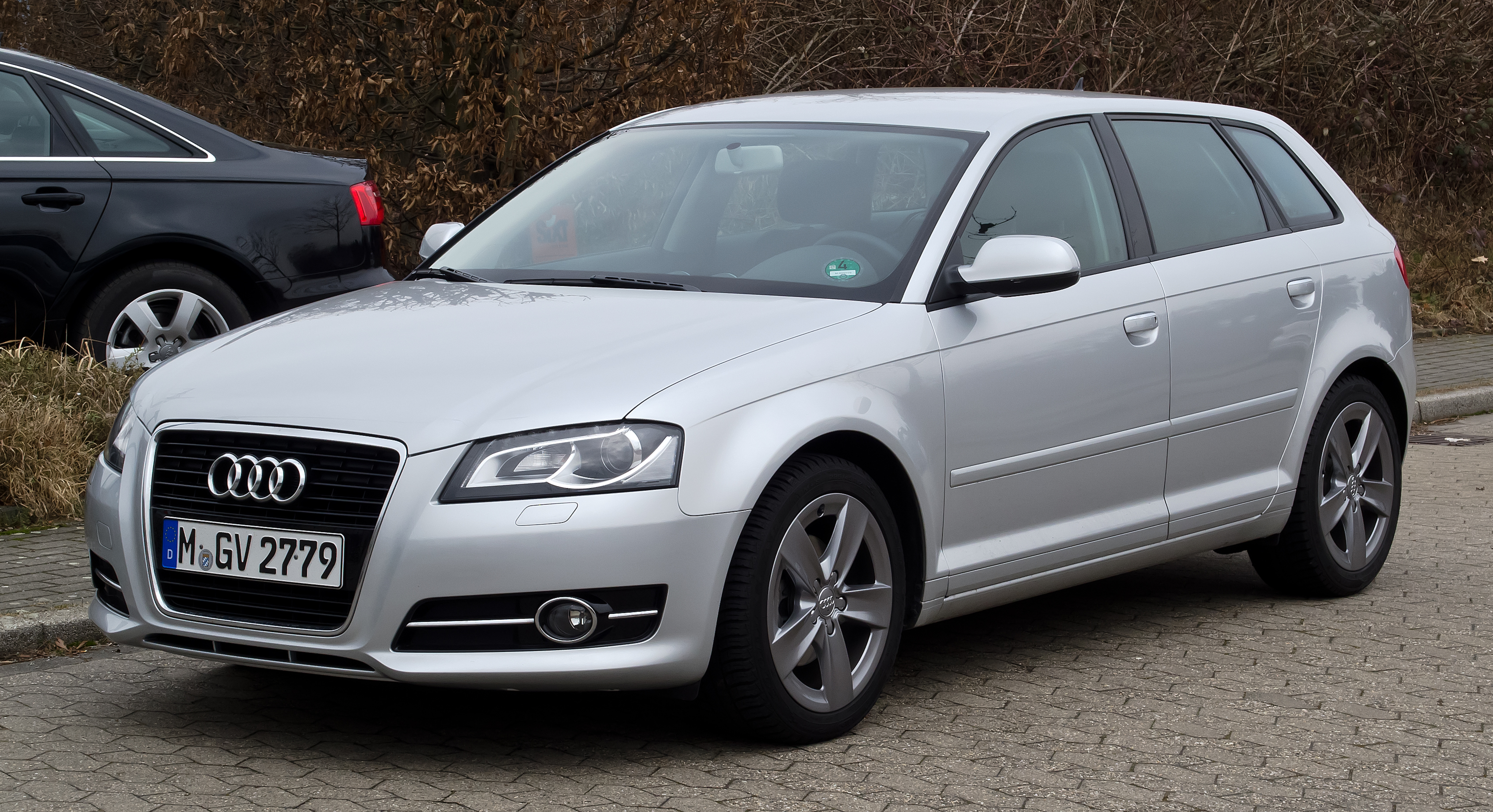
Audi A3 Mk2

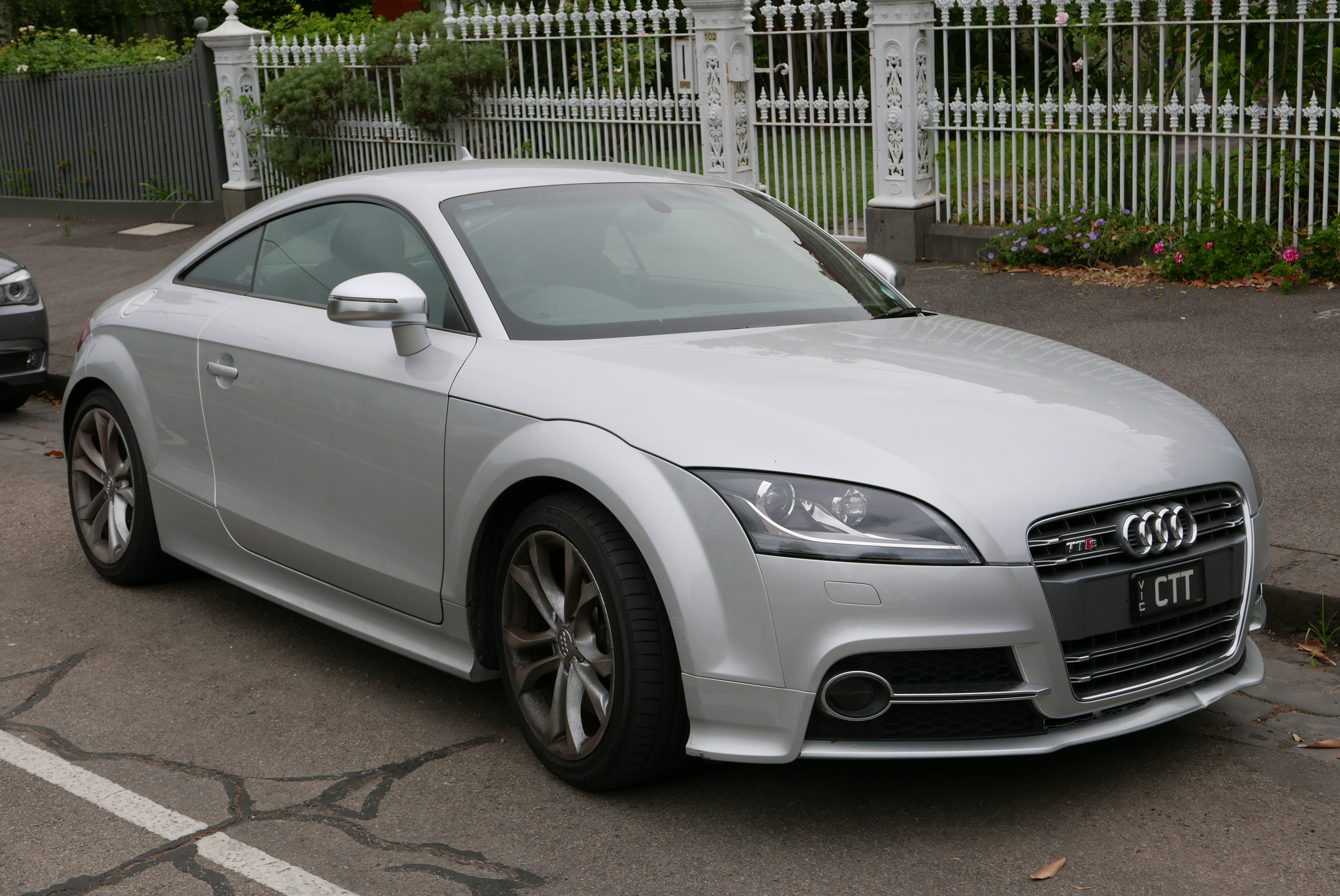
Audi TT Mk2

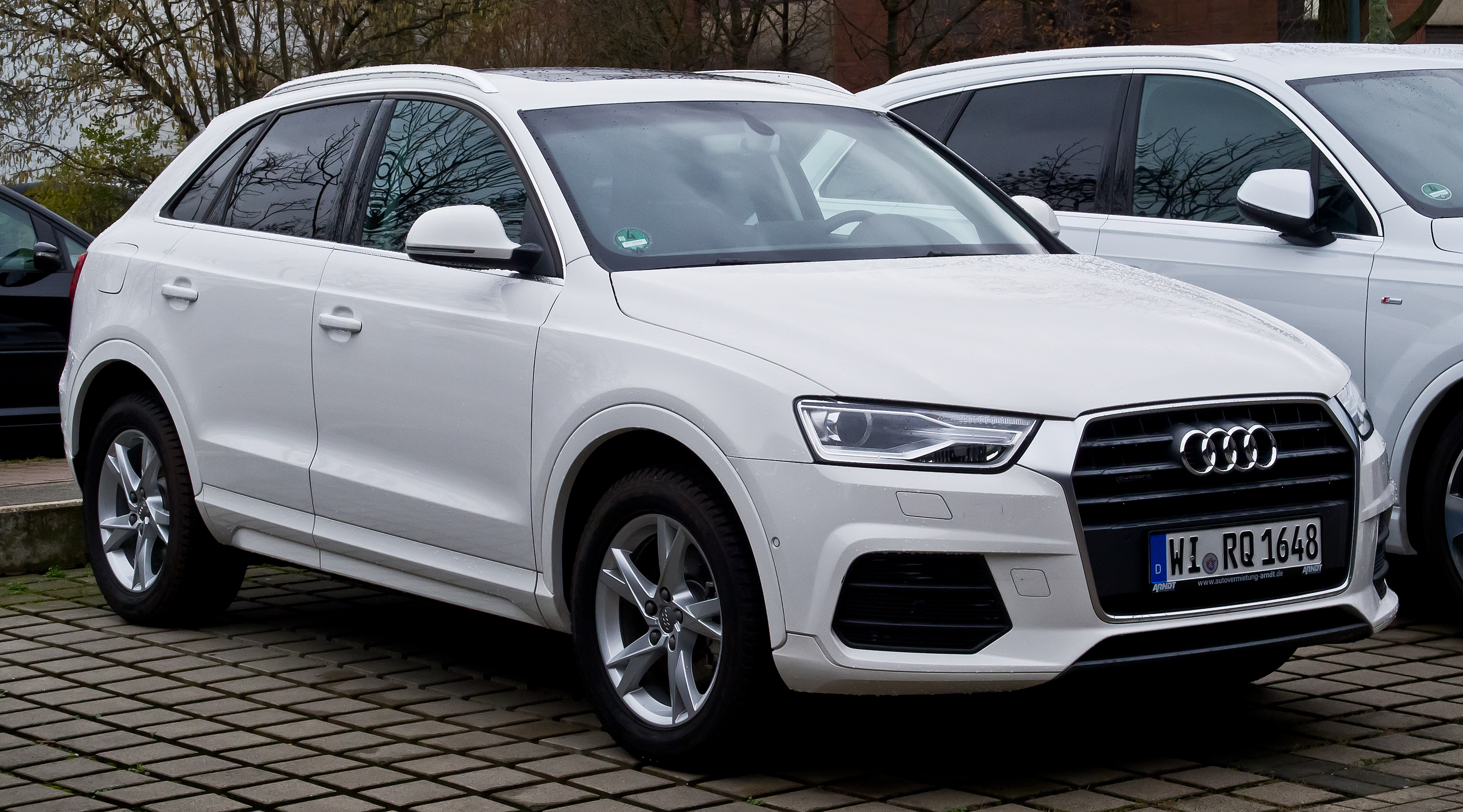
Audi Q3 Mk1

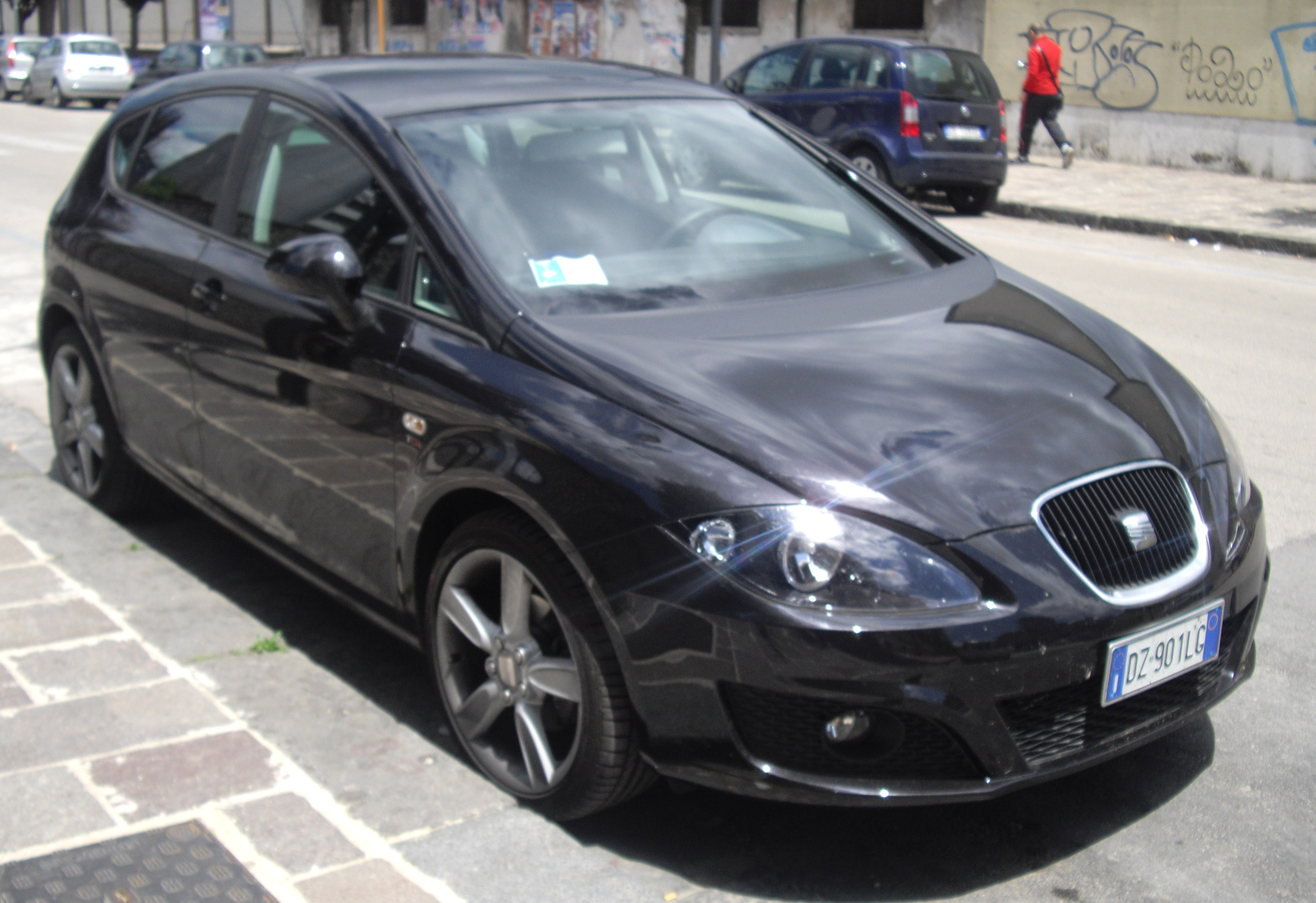
SEAT León Mk2

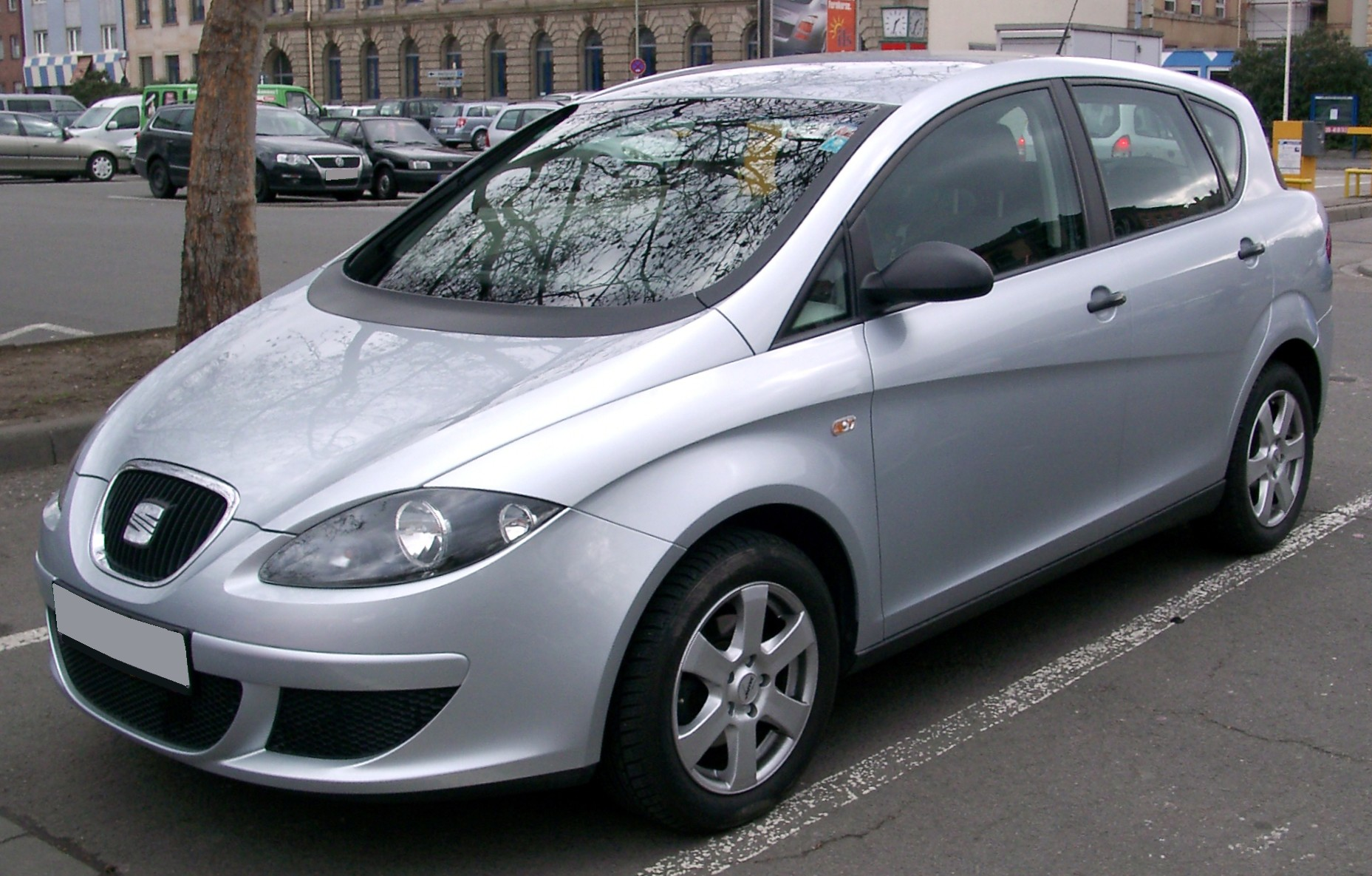
SEAT Toledo Mk3

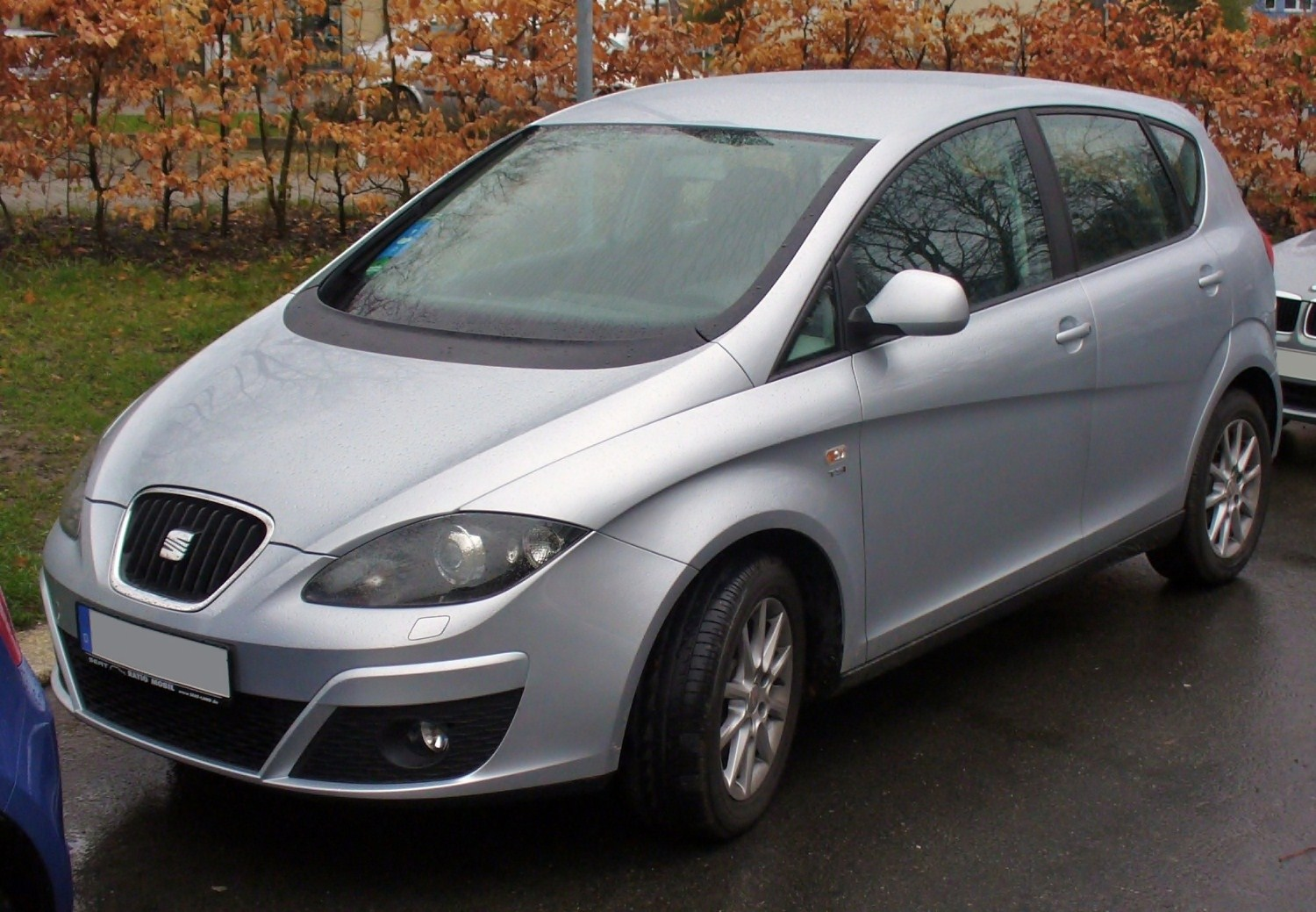
SEAT Altea

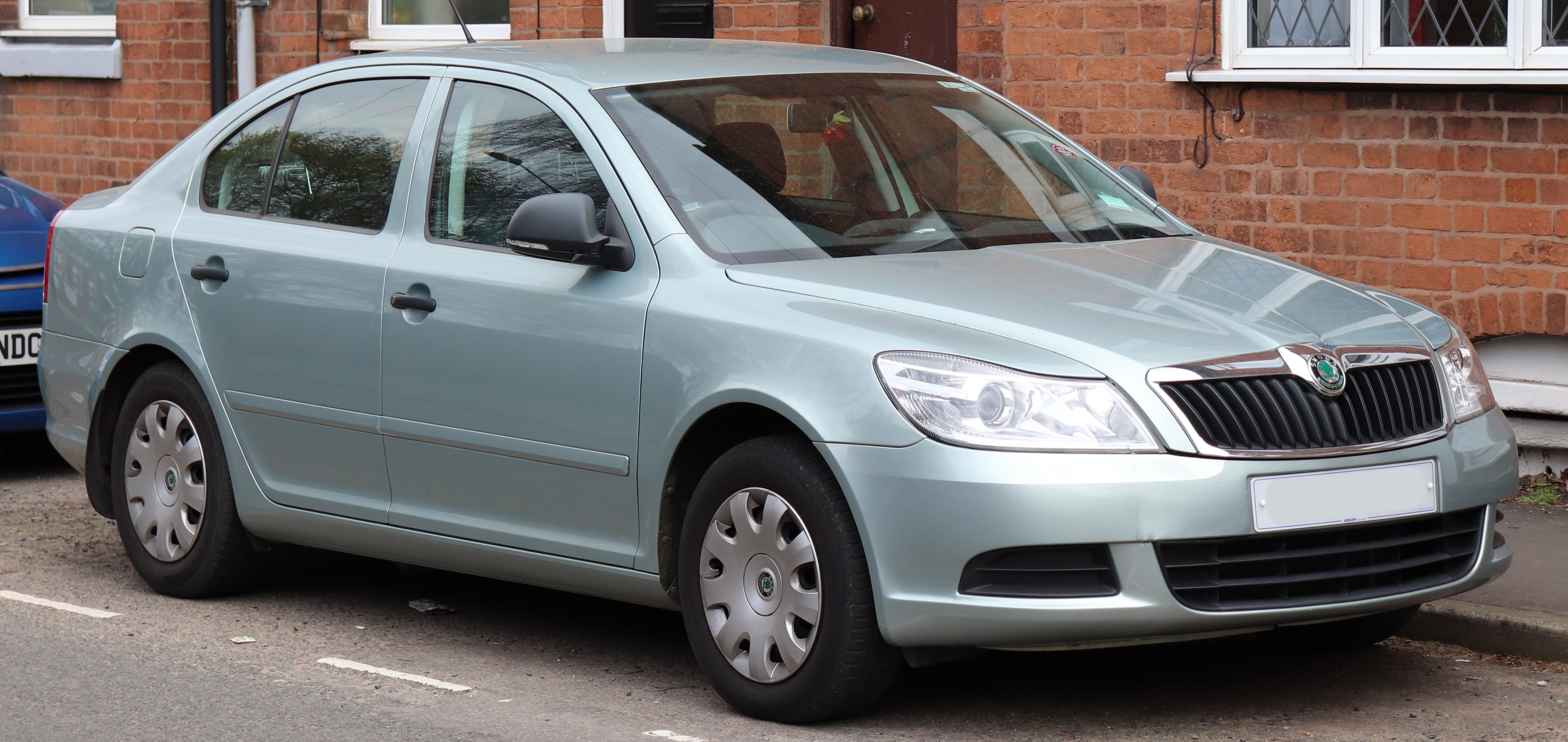
Škoda Octavia Mk2

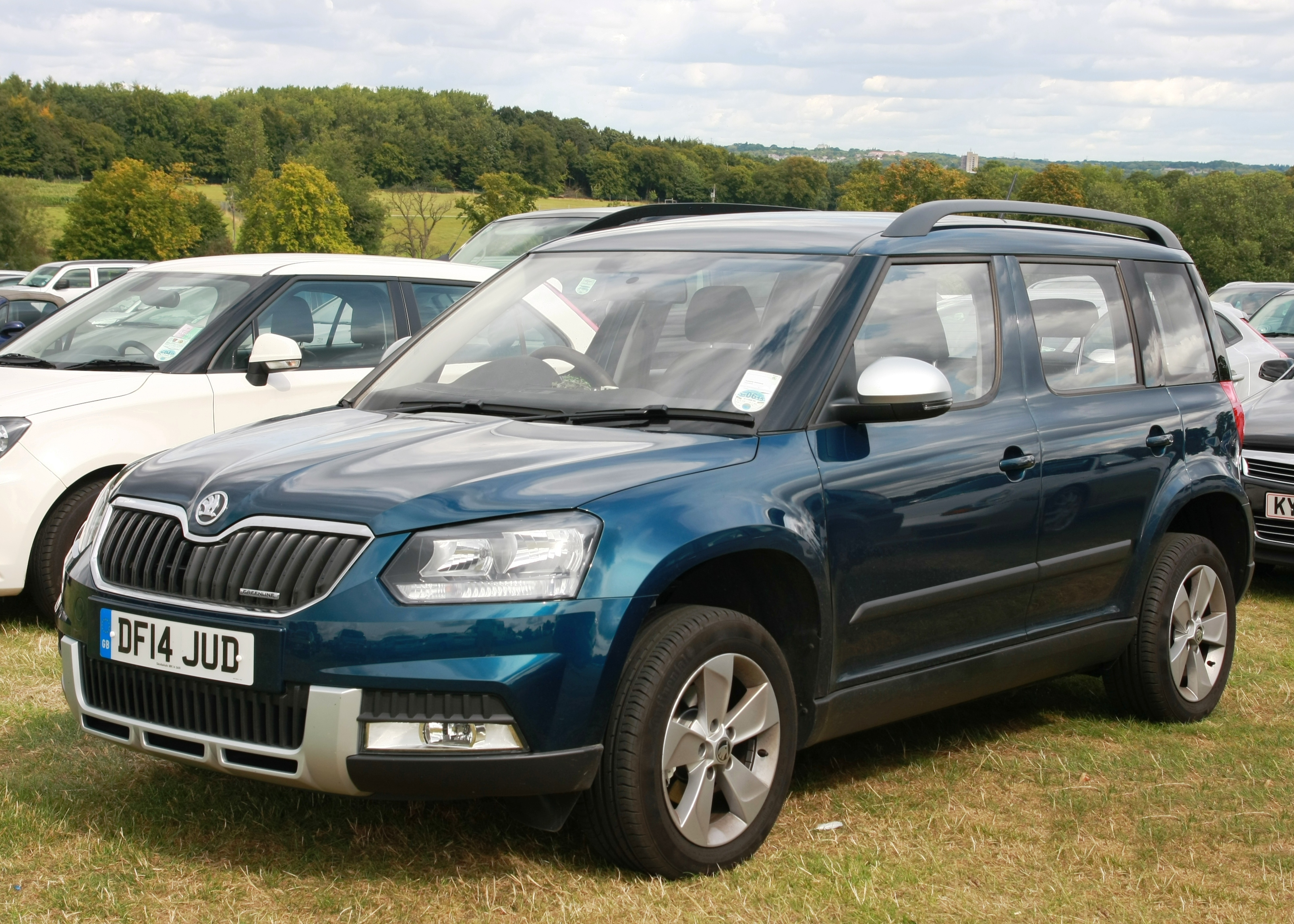
Škoda Yeti

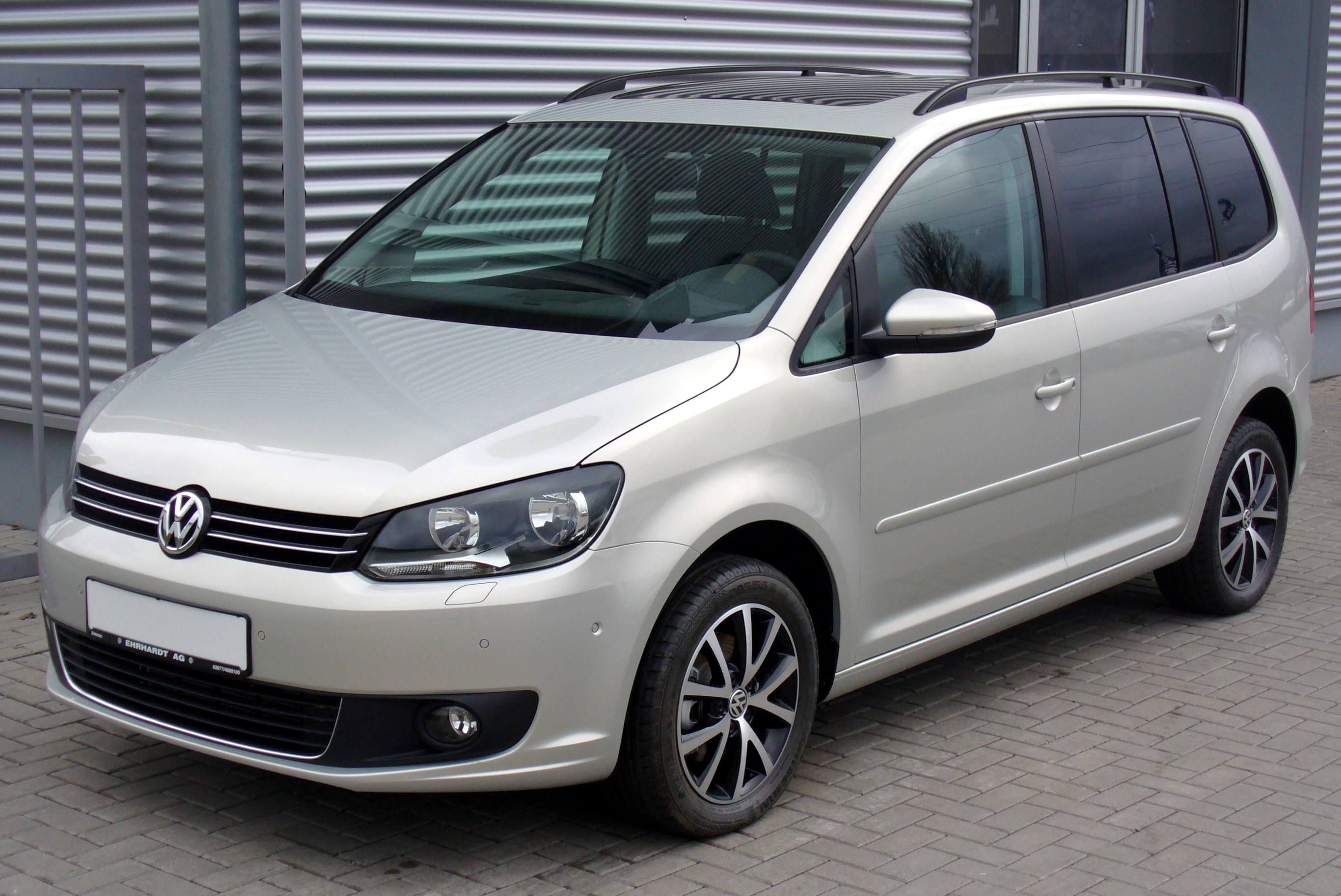
Volkswagen Touran

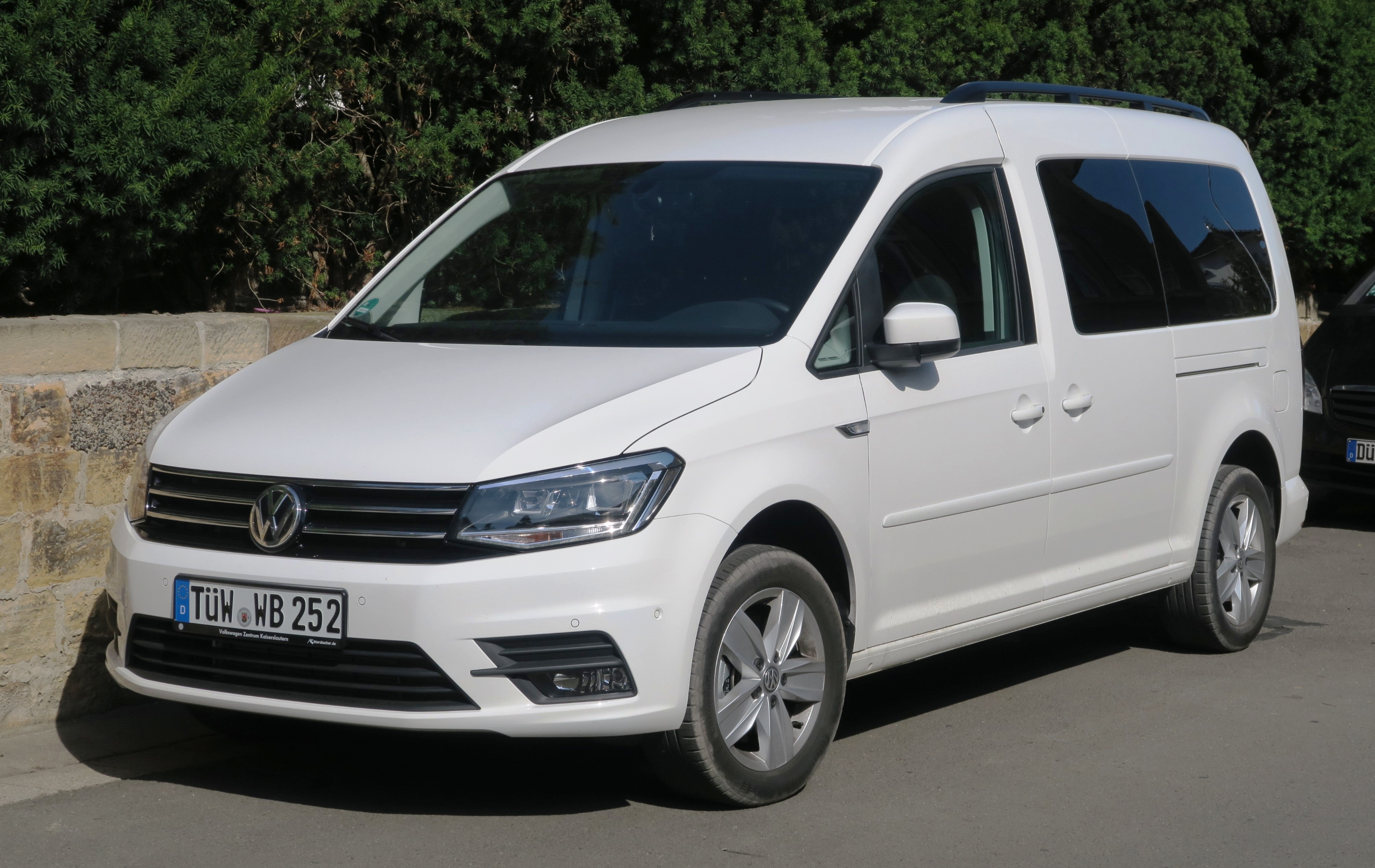
Volkswagen Caddy Mk3

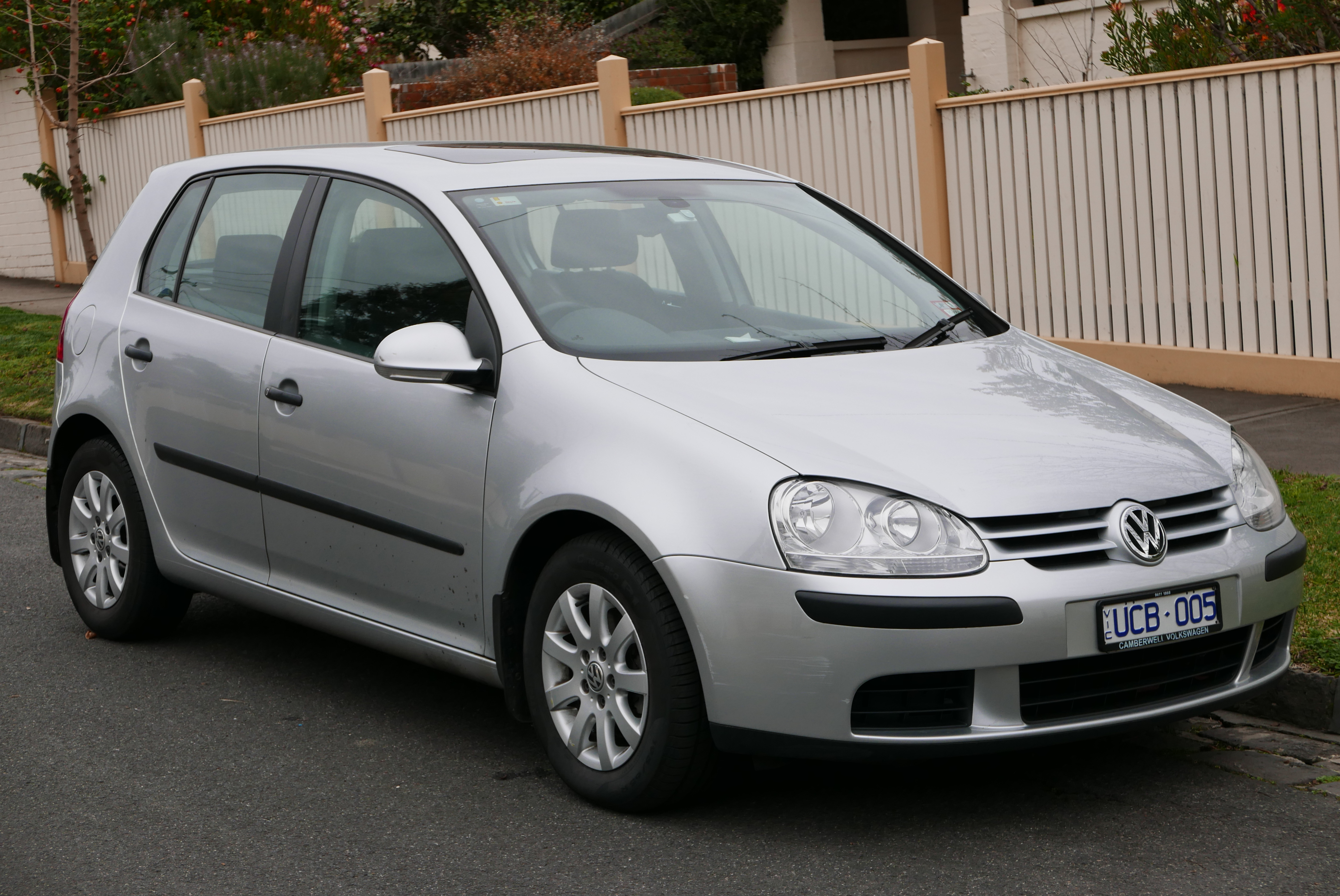
Volkswagen Golf Mk5

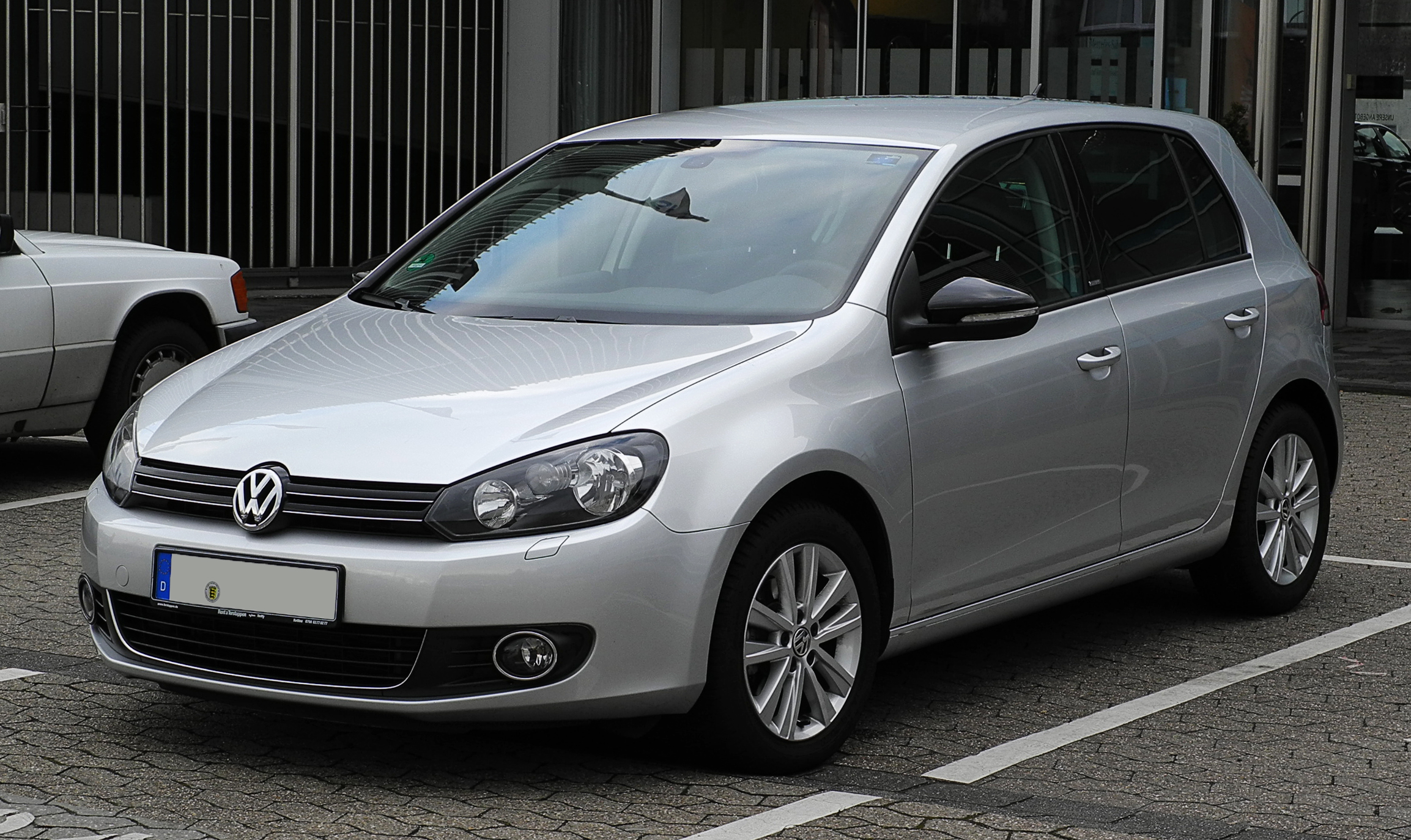
Volkswagen Golf Mk6

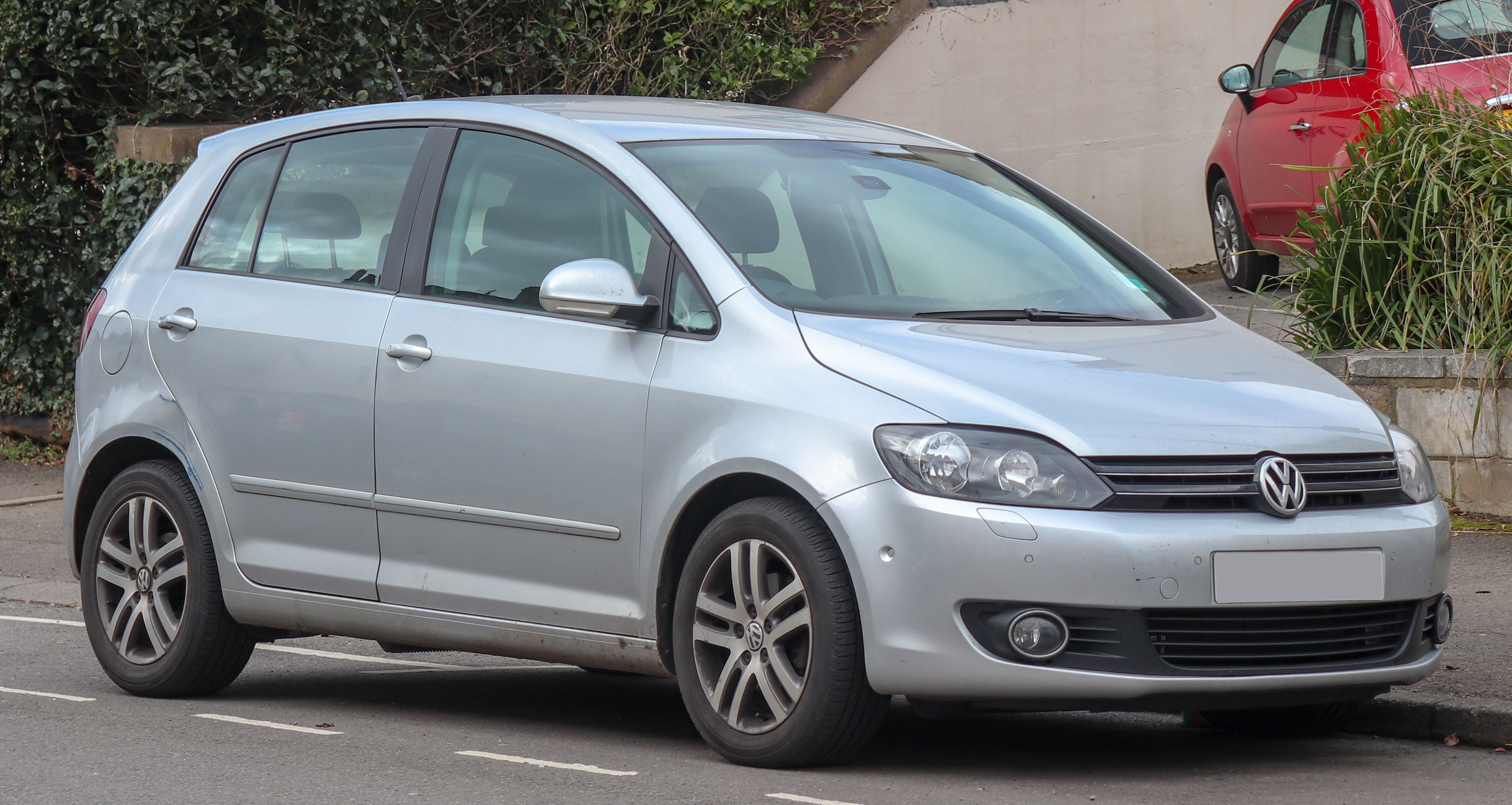
Volkswagen Golf Plus

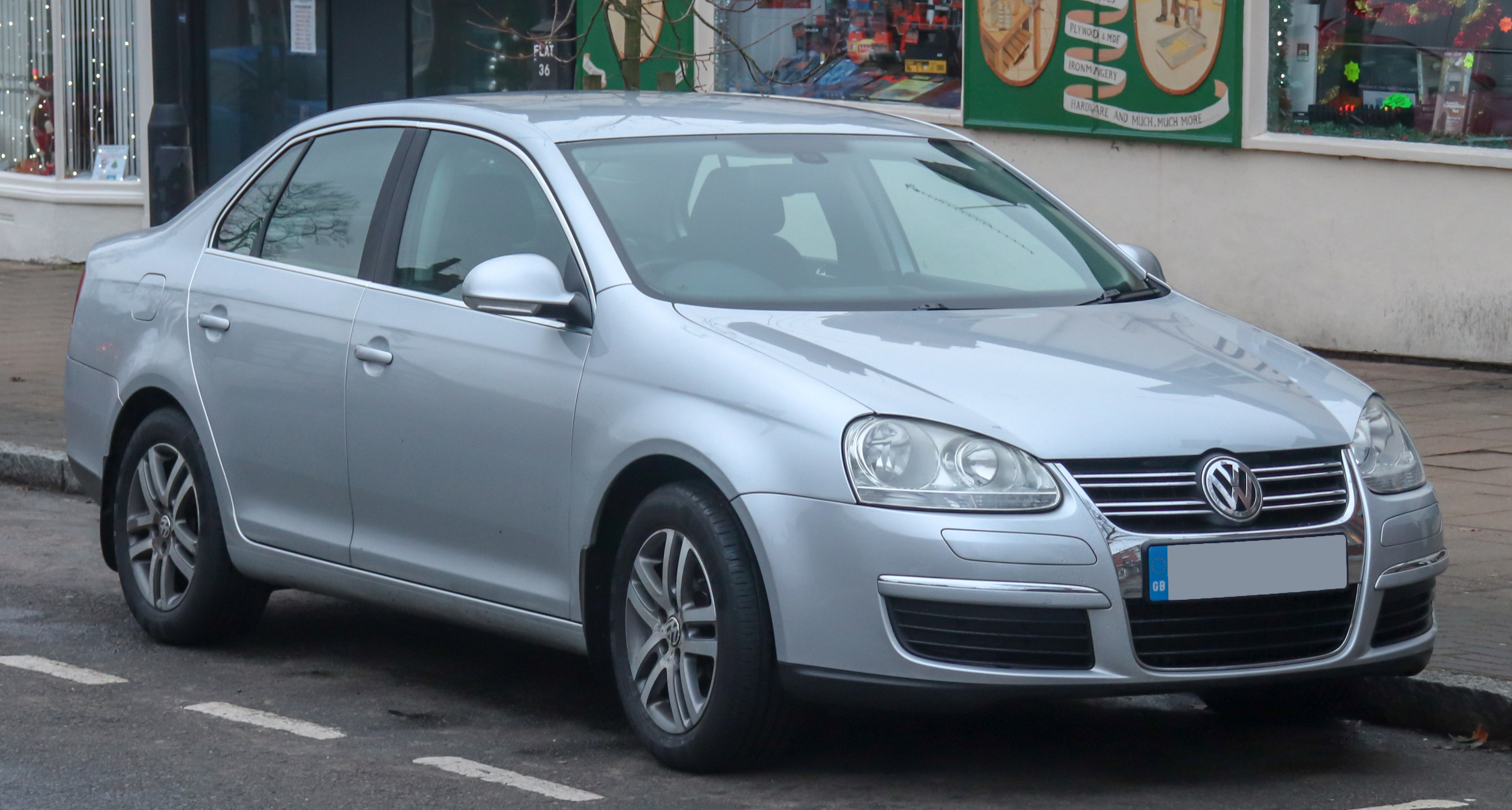
Volkswagen Jetta (A5)

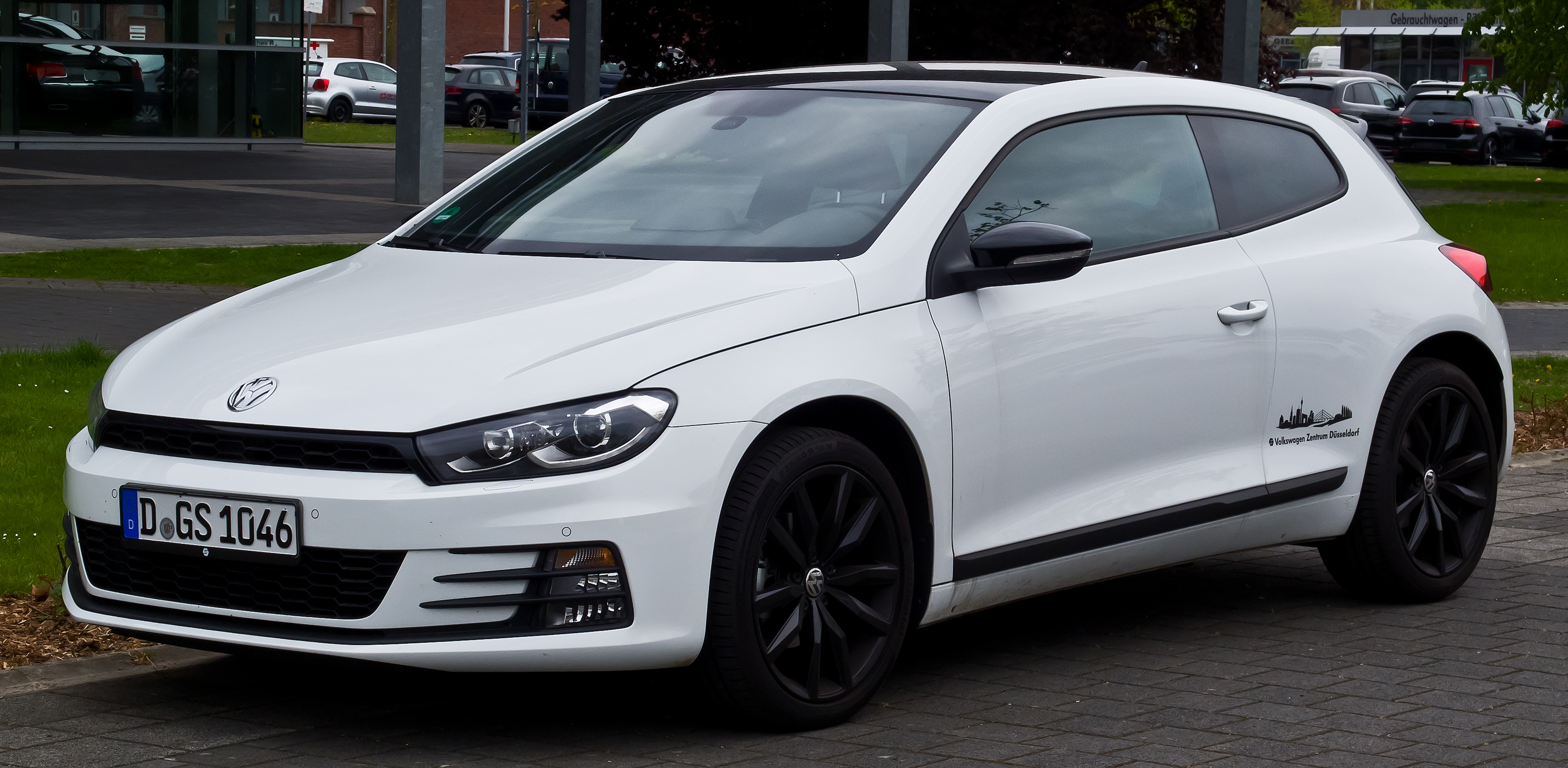
Volkswagen Scirocco Mk3

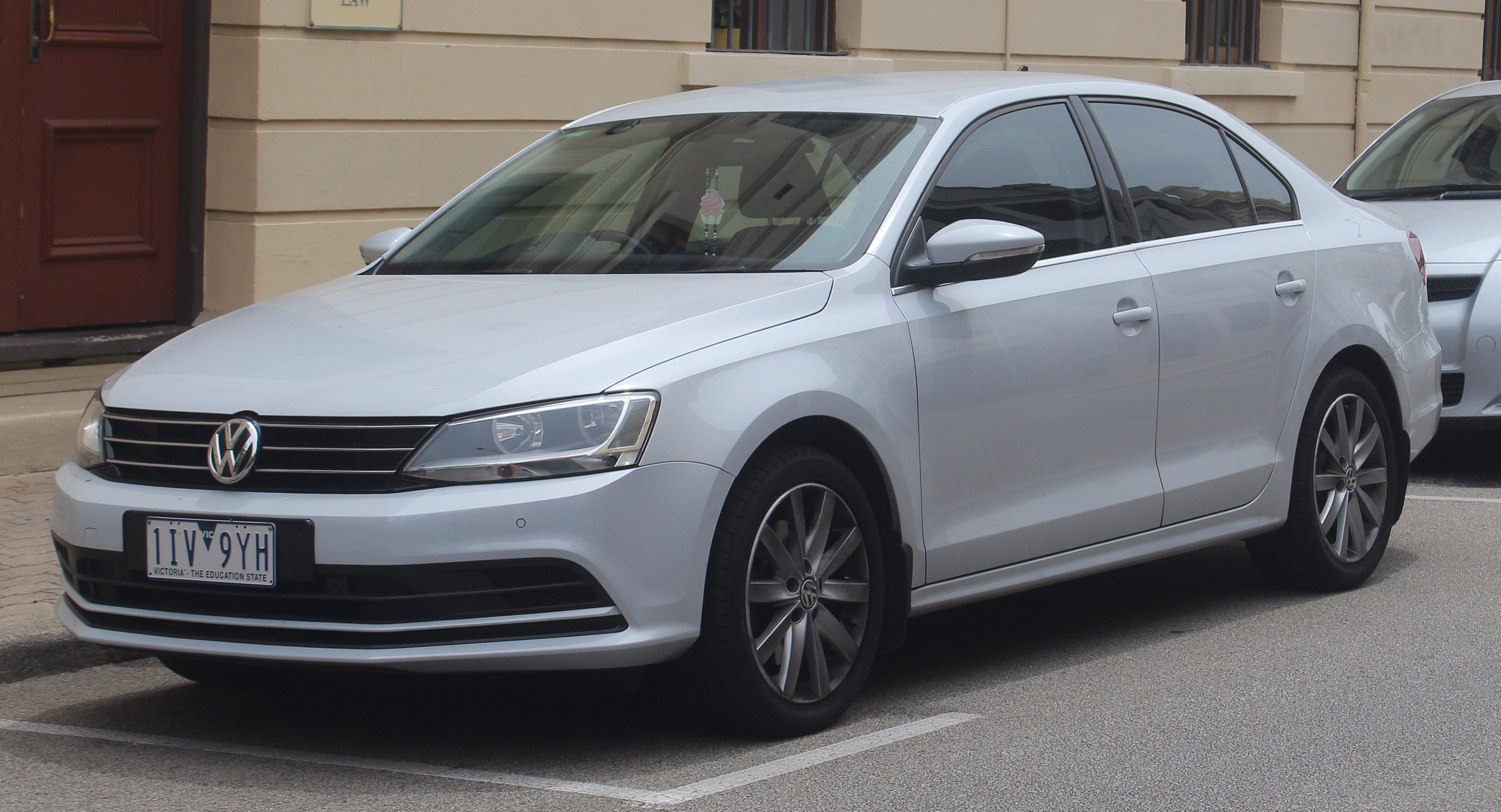
Volkswagen Jetta (A6)

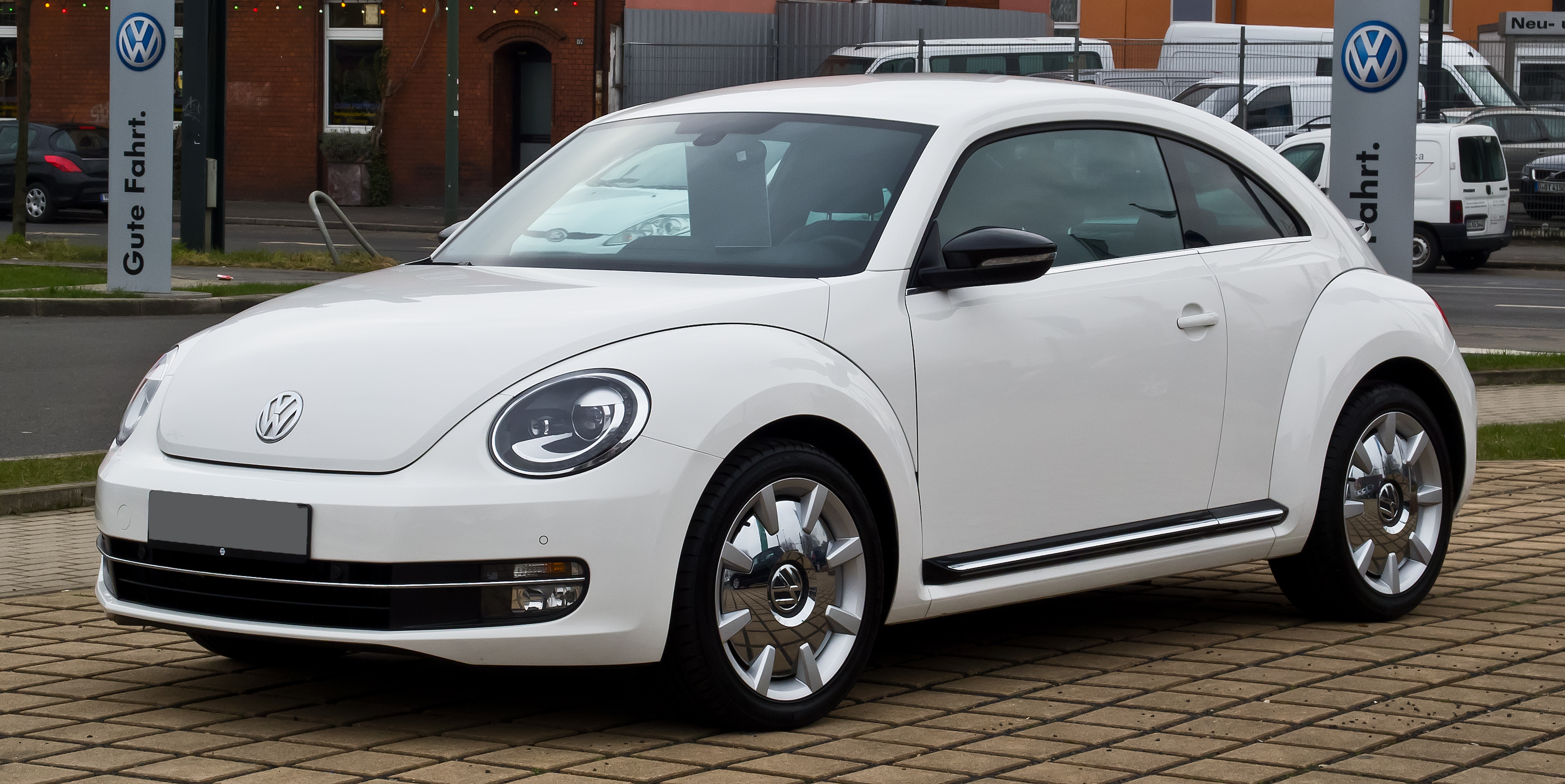
Volkswagen Beetle (A5)

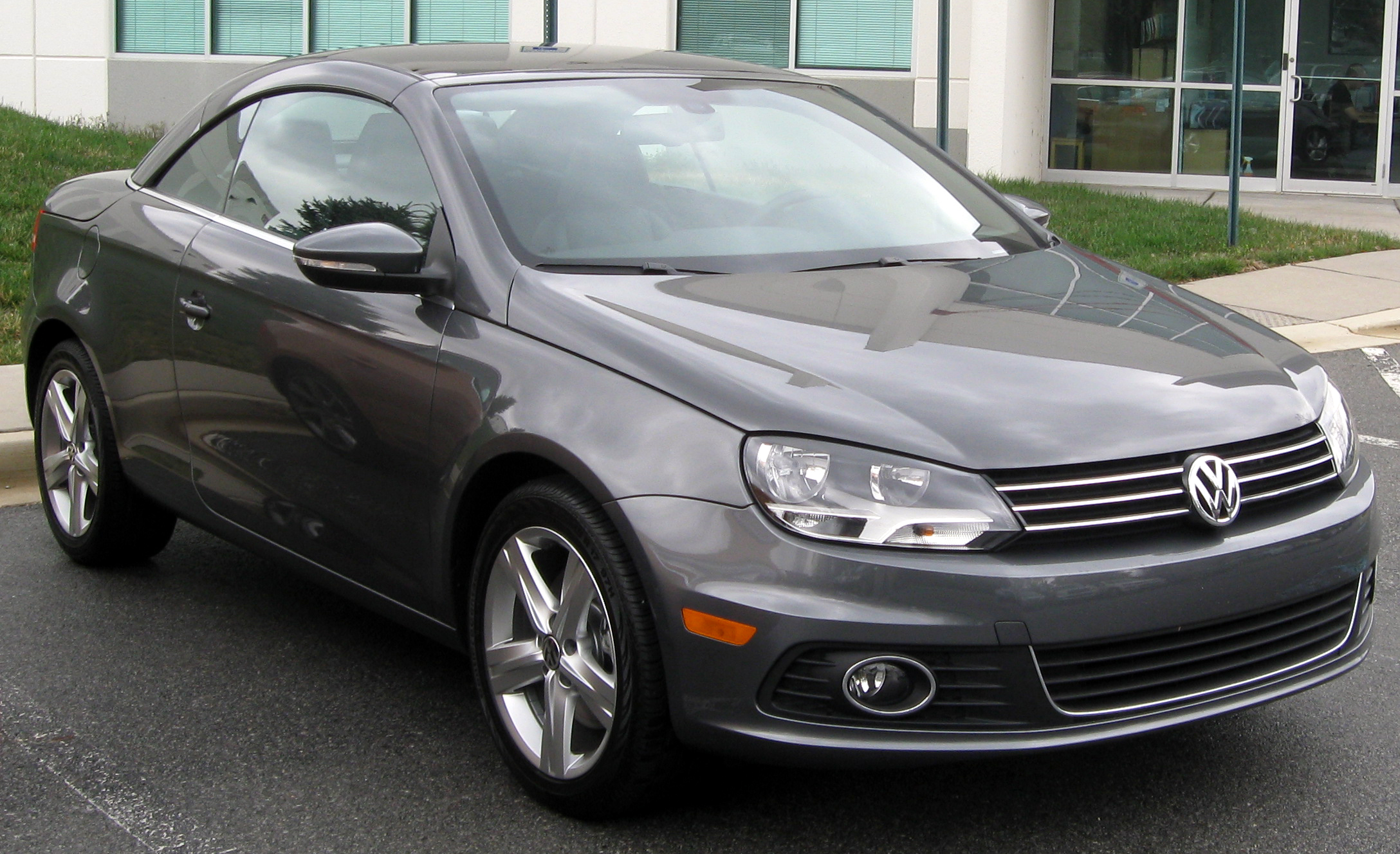
Volkswagen Eos
