= Beales (surname) =

Beales is a surname, and may refer to:

- A. C. F. Beales (1905–1974), British historian
- Arthur Beales (1871–1955), Canadian photographer
- Barclay Beales, singer
- C. William Beales (1877–1927), American politician
- Claude Beales (1887–1963), Australian rules footballer
- Danny Beales (born 1988), British politician
- Derek Beales (1931–2023), British historian
- Edmond Beales, (1803–1881), English political activist and judge
- Greg Beales (born 1977), English civil servant and political adviser
- Peter Beales (1936–2013), English horticulturist and writer
- Randolph A. Beales (born 1960), American judge
- Reginald Beales (1898–1988), American violinist
- Walter Beales (1893–1962), British flying officer

== See also ==
- Beals
- Beale
