= Volkswagen Beetle (disambiguation) =

Volkswagen Beetle could refer to a number of different models by Volkswagen:

- Volkswagen Beetle, the original model manufactured from 1938 to 2003
- Volkswagen New Beetle, manufactured from 1998 to 2010
- Volkswagen Beetle (A5), manufactured since 2012 to 2019 final
