= Beetle (disambiguation) =

A beetle is an insect belonging to the order Coleoptera.

Beetle or The Beetle may also refer to:

== Arts and entertainment ==
- Beetle (comics), the alias of a number of characters in Marvel Comics
- Beetle (game), a British party game
- Beetle (solitaire), a card game
- the title character of Beetle Bailey, an American newspaper comic strip
- "Beetles", an alien race from The Eternaut
- The Beetle (film), a 1919 British silent film
- The Beetle (novel), an 1897 novel by Richard Marsh

== People ==
- Alan Ackerman Beetle (1913–2003), U.S. botanist
- Walter Bedell Smith (1895–1961), U.S. Army general nicknamed "Beetle"

== Places ==
- Beetle, Kentucky, United States
- Beetle Spur, Mount Patrick, Antarctica

== Transportation ==
- Volkswagen Beetle (made 1938–2003), or two Volkswagen models with derivative styling:
  - Volkswagen New Beetle (made 1997–2010)
  - Volkswagen Beetle (A5) (made 2011–2019)
- Beetle (JR Kyushu), a Japanese ferry service
- Beetle Cat, a boat built by Beetle, Inc.

== Other uses ==
- GE Beetle a mobile manipulator for nuclear material
- Beetle tank, or Goliath tracked mine, a German World War II unmanned fighting vehicle
- Alexandria Blue Anchors, or Alexandria Beetles, a former baseball team
- Beetle (ASIC), an application-specific integrated circuit
- Beetle, a large wooden mallet hammer

== See also ==
- American Beetles, a zoology book
- The American Beetles, a stage name used by The Ardells, a music band from Florida during the 1960s
- The Beatles (disambiguation)
- Betel, a leaf often chewed
- Betel nut, or Areca nut
