= Beales =

Beales may refer to:

- Beales (department store)
- Beales (surname)

== See also ==
- Beals (disambiguation)
- Beale (disambiguation)
- Beatles (disambiguation)
