= Arthur Beales =

Arthur Beales may refer to:

- Arthur Beales (photographer) (1871–1955), American photographer
- A. C. F. Beales (Arthur Charles Frederick Beales, 1905–1974), British historian
