= Dung beetle (disambiguation) =

Dung beetles are any of various insects of the superfamily Scarabaeoidea, most of which feed on animal droppings.

Dung beetle(s) may also refer to:

- Dung Beetles (video game), a 1982 computer game
- Dung Beetles, characters from the Conker video game series
- "Dung Beetle", a song from the album It Doesn't Matter Anymore by The Supernaturals

== See also ==
- Beetle (disambiguation)
