= Black Beetle =

Black Beetle may refer to:

== Insects ==
- One of a number of beetles:
  - Oriental cockroach (Blatta orientalis), or black beetle
  - Heteronychus arator, the African black beetle

== Comics ==
- Black Beetle (DC Comics), a fictional character
- The Black Beetle (Dark Horse Comics), a 2012 comic book based on a character of the same name

== Music ==
- Black Beetle, a band featuring Joan Wasser
- "Black Beetles", a 2015 song from B4.Da.$$ by Joey Badass

== Vehicle ==
- The M-497 Black Beetle, an experimental jet-powered locomotive test bed

== See also ==
- Beetle (disambiguation)
- "Black Beatles", a 2016 song by Rae Sremmurd
- Billy Preston, American musician sometimes called "the Black Beatle" for his collaboration with The Beatles
