= Volkswagen de México =

Mexican subsidiary of Volkswagen Group

Volkswagen de México S.A. de C.V.
- Type: Subsidiary
- Industry: Automotive
- Founded: 1964; 62 years ago
- Headquarters: Puebla, Mexico
- Area served: North and South America
- Key people: Steffen Reiche (CEO)
- Products: Automobile, auto parts
- Production output: 443,435 vehicles (Puebla Plant, 2019); 333,354 engines (Silao Plant, 2019)
- Brands: Volkswagen
- Services: Automotive financial services
- Number of employees: 13,000 (Puebla and Silao Plants)
- Parent: Volkswagen Group
- Website: vw.com.mx

Volkswagen de México S.A. de C.V. (Sociedad Anónima de Capital Variable) is the Mexican subsidiary of Volkswagen Group. It operates the Mexican plants of Volkswagen Group and the leasing company Volkswagen Leasing S.A. de C.V., and Volkswagen Bank S.A. Institución de Banca Múltiple. The company is headquartered in Puebla (city).

Aside from the location of the administrative headquarters, the city of Puebla is also the home to the largest Volkswagen plant in the country (14,608 employees, area: 3,000,000 m^{2}). The company opened a smaller 600,000 m² and 577-employee production site opened on January 15, 2013 in Silao, Guanajuato. The Silao plant was Volkswagen's 100th production plant worldwide. In 2004, a MAN Latin America Indústria e Comércio de Veículos Ltda factory opened in Querétaro which manufactures VW products (e.g., Volksbus) to a lesser extent.

Volkswagen de México was founded in 1964 and has about 16,400 employees. The first automobile manufactured by the company rolled off the production line in 1967. The VW Puebla plant is the largest employer of the city of Puebla. In the plant, the Volkswagen Beetle was built until 2003. The Puebla plant produces the following models: Jetta, Golf, Golf SportWagen and the long-wheelbased version of Tiguan.

In 2007, Volkswagen de México was the third largest car producer in the country, behind General Motors and Nissan.

An engine plant in Silao started its operations in January 2013. This factory supplies the third generation of EA888 engines family to the Volkswagen vehicle plants in Puebla; Chattanooga, Tennessee; and Audi plant in San José Chiapa, Puebla. It has an annual production capacity of 420,000 engines with a total plant site area of 60 hectares.

== Puebla Plant production ==
=== Current ===
- Volkswagen Jetta (1979–present)
- Volkswagen Tiguan (2016–present)
- Volkswagen Taos (2020–present)

=== Former ===
- Volkswagen Golf hatchback & GTI models Mk1,2 ,3 ,4 & 7 (1977–2021, except Mk5, 6 & 8)
- Volkswagen Golf station wagon (2007–2021)
- Volkswagen Beetle (A5) (2011–2019)
- Volkswagen New Beetle (1997–2011)
- Volkswagen Beetle (1967–2003)
- Volkswagen Safari
- Volkswagen Combi
- Volkswagen Brasilia
- Volkswagen Caribe
