= Beatles (disambiguation) =

The Beatles were an English rock band of the 1960s.

Beatles or The Beatles may also refer to:

== Music ==
- The Beatles (album), a 1968 album by the Beatles
- "Beatles" (song), a song by Forbes
- The Beatles, two albums in the Beatles discography released by Amiga Records in East Germany in 1965 and 1982
- "The Beatles", a song by Daniel Johnston that appeared on the albums Yip/Jump Music, Lost and found and Beam Me Up!

== Others ==
- Beatles (novel), a novel by Lars Saabye Christensen
- The Beatles (TV series), an American animated television series
- The Beatles (terrorist cell), an ISIS terrorist cell, with the members known as John (or Jihadi John), George, Ringo and Paul
- The Beatles Statue, statue in Liverpool, England

== See also ==
- Beetle (disambiguation)
