= Claude Beales =

Australian rules footballer (1887–1963)

Personal information
- Full name: Claud Alfred Herbert Beales
- Born: 23 August 1887; Geelong, Victoria
- Died: 3 August 1963 (aged 75); Brisbane, Queensland
- Original team: Chilwell / Geelong Juniors

Playing career^{1}
Years	Club	Games (Goals)
1905	St Kilda	1 (0)
- ^{1} Playing statistics correct to the end of 1905.

Claud Alfred Herbert Beales (23 August 1887 – 3 August 1963) was an Australian rules footballer who played with St Kilda in the Victorian Football League (VFL).
