= Beetle (game) =

British party game

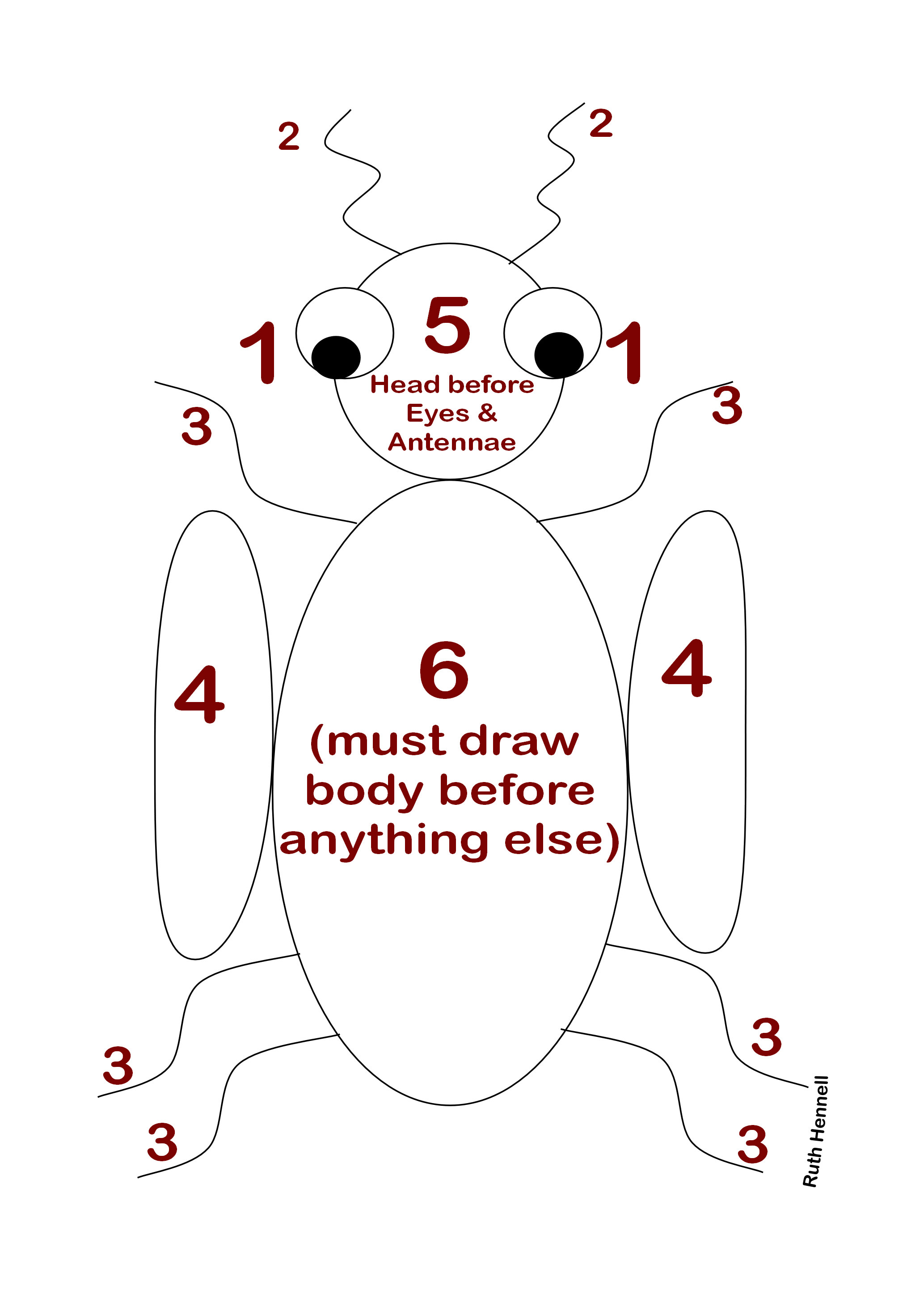
A beetle with its component parts numbered. The body must be drawn before any other part; the head must be drawn before eyes or antennae

Beetle is a British party game in which one draws a beetle in parts. The game may be played solely with pen, paper and a die or using a commercial game set, some of which contain custom scorepads and dice and others which contain pieces which snap together to make a beetle/bug. It is sometimes called Cootie or Bugs. The game is entirely based on random die rolls, with no skill involved.

== Playing ==
The part drawn is decided by the roll of a die. The traditional rolls are:

⚅ - Six is for the body, of which there is one.
⚄ - Five is for the head, of which there is one.
⚃ - Four is for the wings, of which there are two.
⚂ - Three is for a leg, of which there are six.
⚁ - Two is for an antenna, of which there are two.
⚀ - One is for an eye, of which there are two.

The part corresponding to each roll of the die, however, may vary depending on the rules established by the players.

It is necessary to roll the correct number for the body before any other part may be drawn. To the body, one may attach the head, legs or wings, but the head must precede the antenna and eyes. The first player to draw all the requisite parts is the winner.

== Table-top games ==
Beetle has been converted to a commercial game called Cootie, and is also released under the name Beetle by Milton Bradley. Beetles are constructed as plastic models. There are some minor gameplay differences, such as there being no wings on the beetles.

== Beetle drive ==
This game is played at social occasions known as a beetle drive, in which many rounds of the game are played. The players are in groups of four with a communal die, and the first player to complete their beetle shouts out "Beetle!" stopping the play of all the groups. Then the winner of each particular group (the player with the most complete beetle in that group) will move around a circle of tables to the right (clockwise), and the loser (the player with the least complete beetle) to the left (anti-clockwise), or sit still. The ultimate winner is usually either the one who has drawn the most complete beetles, or the one who has drawn the most parts in total. Beetle drives were very popular as church fund-raising events, especially amongst Non-conformist churches, and the tradition continues to the present. These are often accompanied by a "pie and pea" supper, particularly in the North East of England.
