= Beetle (ASIC) =

Analog readout chip

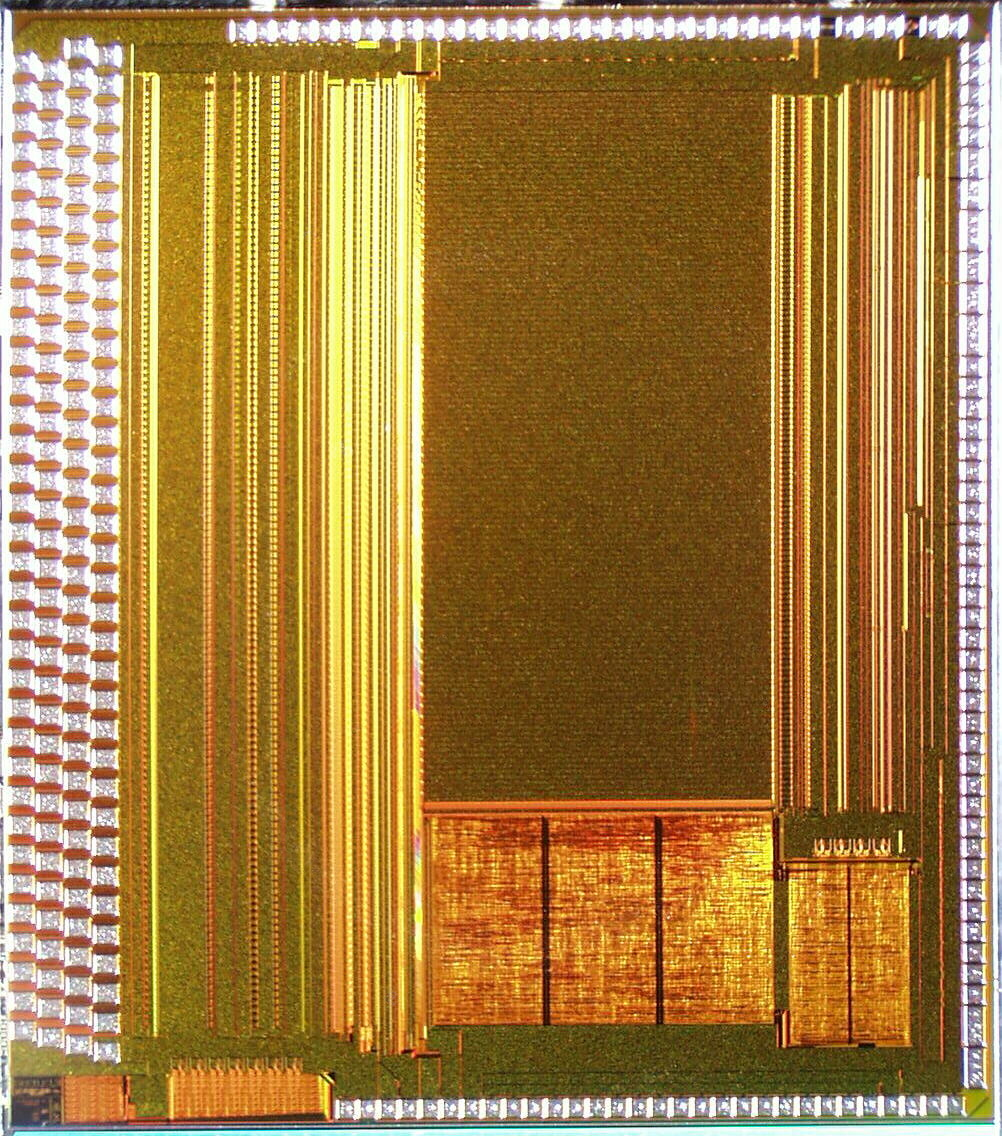
Beetle chip

The Beetle ASIC is an analog readout chip. It is developed for the LHCb experiment at CERN.

== Overview ==
The chip integrates 128 channels with low-noise charge-sensitive pre-amplifiers and shapers. The pulse shape can be chosen such that it complies with LHCb specifications: a peaking time of 25 ns with a remainder of the peak voltage after 25 ns of less than 30%. A comparator per channel with configurable polarity provides a binary signal. Four adjacent comparator channels are being ORed and brought off chip via LVDS drivers.

Either the shaper or comparator output is sampled with the LHC bunch-crossing frequency of 40 MHz into an analog pipeline. This ring buffer has a programmable latency of a maximum of 160 sampling intervals and an integrated derandomising buffer of 16 stages. For analogue readout data is multiplexed with up to 40 MHz onto one or four ports. A binary readout mode operates at up to 80 MHz output rate on two ports. Current drivers bring the serialised data off chip.

The chip can accept trigger rates up to 1.1 MHz to perform a dead-timeless readout within 900 ns per trigger. For testability and calibration purposes, a charge injector with adjustable pulse height is implemented. The bias settings and various other parameters can be controlled via a standard I²C-interface. The chip is radiation hardened to an accumulated dose of more than 100 Mrad. Robustness against single event upset is achieved by redundant logic.
