= Beals =

Beals may refer to:

- Beals, Maine, a town in the United States
- Beals syndrome, a rare congenital connective tissue disorder
- Beals (crater), a lunar crater

People

- Alyn Beals (1921–1993), American football player
- Beals Becker (1886–1943), American baseball player
- Beals Wright (1879–1961), American tennis player
- Carlyle Smith Beals (1899–1979), Canadian astronomer
- Dick Beals (1927–2012), American voice actor
- Gary Beals (born 1982), Canadian singer
- Jennifer Beals (born 1963), American film actress
- Melba Pattillo Beals (born 1941), American journalist and member of the Little Rock Nine
- Othilia Carroll Beals (1875–1970), American lawyer and judge
- Richard Beals (mathematician) (born 1938), American mathematician
- V.S Beals (born 1985), Canadian published author and ordained minister
- Vaughn Beals, American businessman who was CEO and then chairman of Harley-Davidson
- Walter B. Beals, presiding judge from Washington, in the Doctors' Trial

== See also ==
- Beal (disambiguation)
- Beales (disambiguation)
