= A. C. F. Beales =

British historian (1905–1974)

Arthur Charles Frederick Beales (1905 – 16 August 1974) was a British historian.

He was educated at King's College London, where his mentors included F. J. C. Hearnshaw and Eileen Power. Beales spent all but four years of his career at King's; for three years he was a schoolmaster and he worked for University College, Swansea, for a year. From 1964 until his retirement in 1972 he was Professor of History at King's. In 1935 he converted to Catholicism.

== Works ==
- The Catholic Church and International Order (London: Penguin, 1941).
- The History of Peace: A Short Account of the Organised Movements for International Peace (London: G. Bell & Sons, 1941).
- Education Under Penalty: English Catholic Education from the Reformation to Fall of James II, 1547–1689 (London: The Athlone Press, 1963).
- Education: A Framework for Choice (Institute of Economic Affairs, 1967).
