= Volkswagen Beetle (A5) =

Small family car

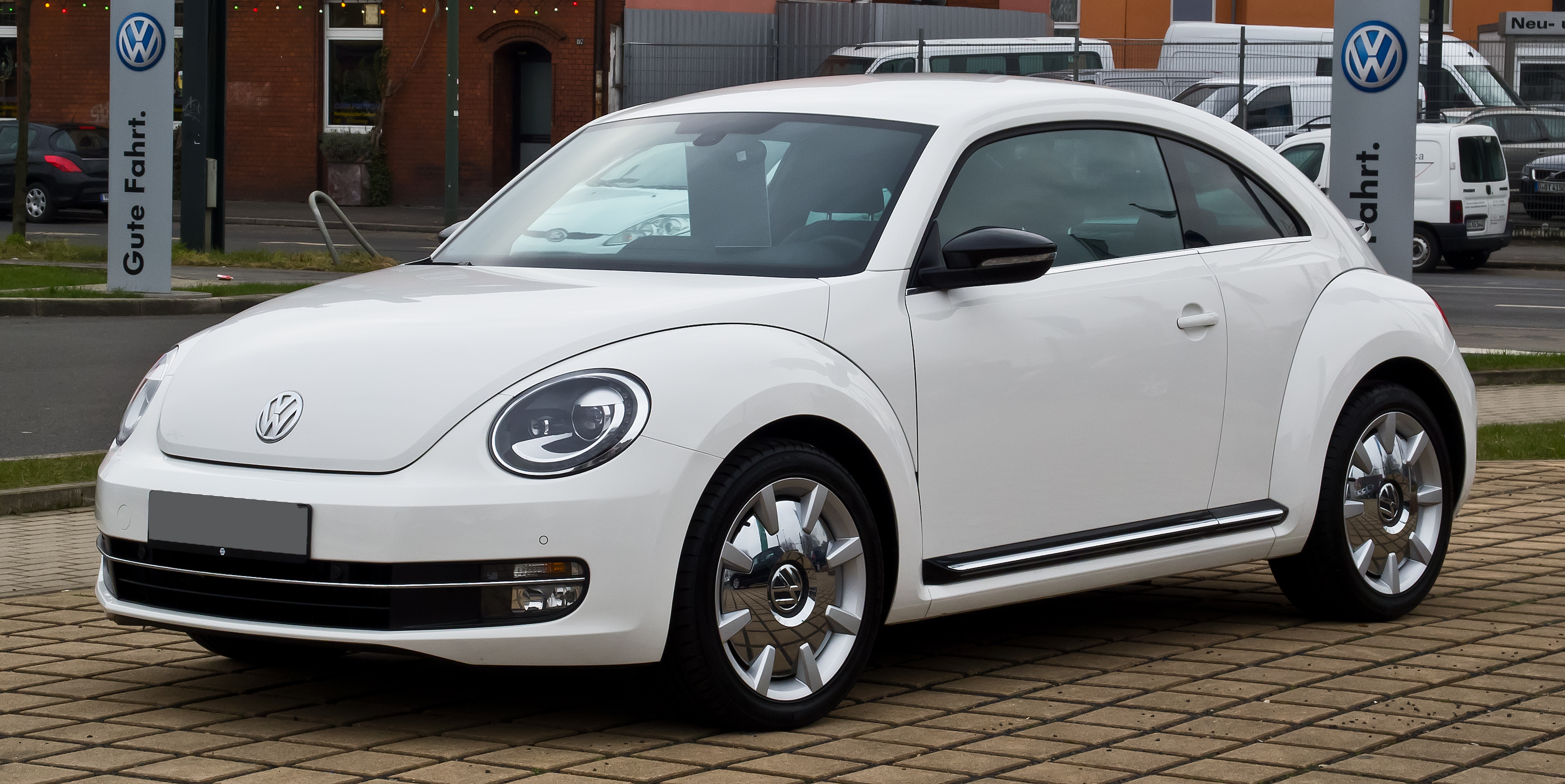
- 2013 Volkswagen Beetle (Germany)

Overview
- Manufacturer: Volkswagen de México
- Also called: Volkswagen Coccinelle (France); Volkswagen Maggiolino (Italy); Volkswagen Fusca (Brazil); Volkswagen The Beetle (Argentina, Japan)
- Production: July 2011 – July 2019
- Model years: 2012–2019
- Assembly: Mexico: Puebla
- Designer: Walter de Silva; Marc Lichte

Body and chassis
- Class: Small family car (C)
- Body style: 3-door hatchback 2-door cabriolet
- Layout: Front-engine, front-wheel-drive
- Platform: Volkswagen Group A5 (PQ35) platform
- Related: Volkswagen Golf Mk6

Powertrain
- Engine: petrol: 1.2 L TSI I4; 1.4 L 16-valve TSI I4; 1.8 L 16-valve TSI I4; 2.0 L 16-valve TSI I4; 2.5 L 20-valve I5; Diesel: 1.6 L TDI I4; 2.0 L TDI I4
- Transmission: 5-speed manual 6-speed manual 6-speed automatic 6-speed DSG; 7-speed DSG

Dimensions
- Wheelbase: 2,537 mm (99.9 in)
- Length: 4,278 mm (168.4 in)
- Width: 1,808 mm (71.2 in)
- Height: 1,486 mm (58.5 in)

Chronology
- Predecessor: Volkswagen New Beetle
- Successor: Volkswagen Golf (for Compact models); Volkswagen T-Roc Cabriolet (for Cabriolet models)

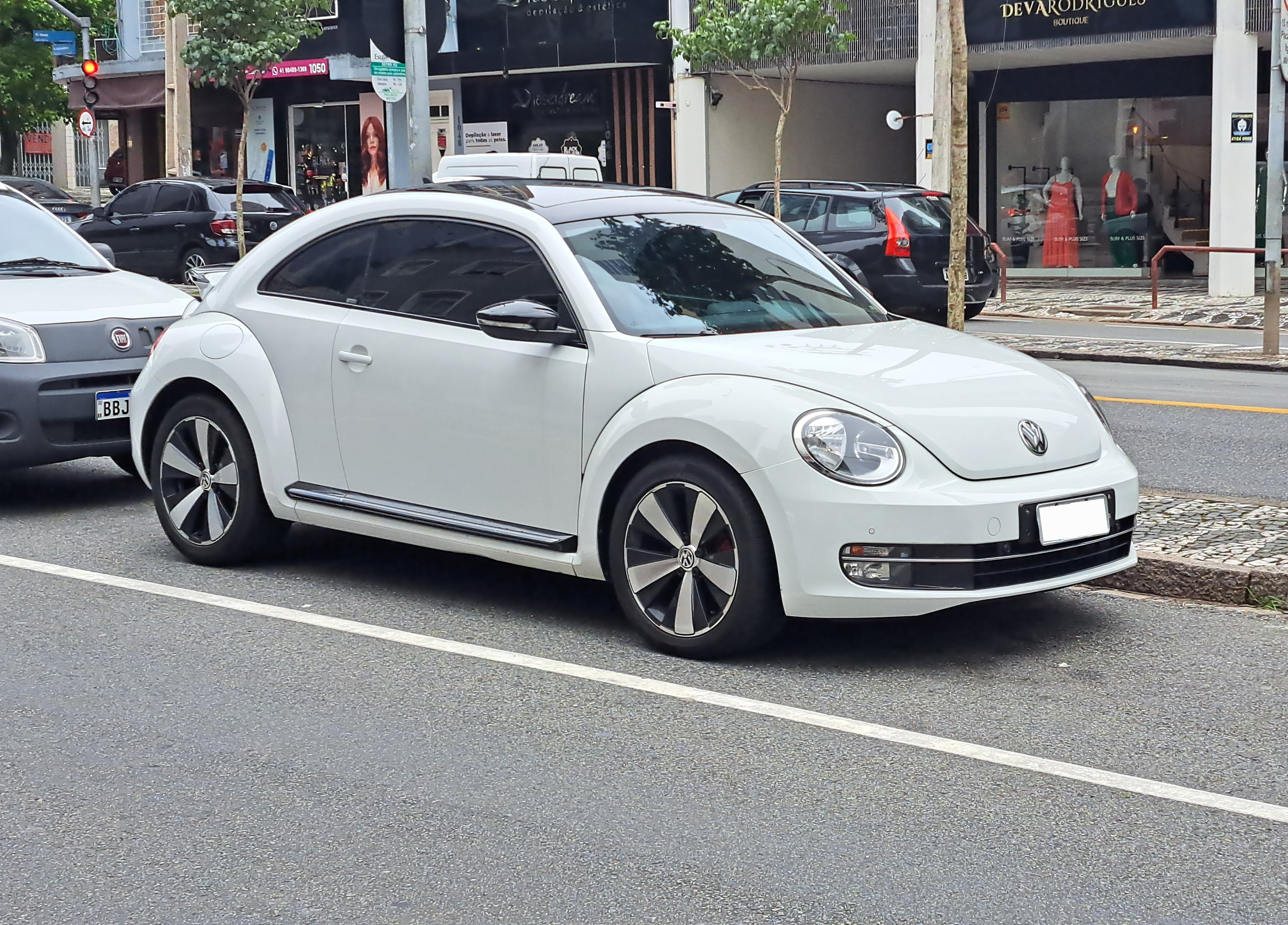
The Beetle (A5) in Brazil, sold as the Fusca

The Volkswagen Beetle (also sold as the Volkswagen Käfer, Volkswagen Coccinelle, Volkswagen Maggiolino, and Volkswagen Fusca in some countries) is a compact car manufactured and marketed by Volkswagen from 2011 until 2019. It was introduced for the 2012 model year as the successor to the Volkswagen New Beetle. It features a lower profile while retaining an overall shape homaging the original Volkswagen Type 1 Beetle. One of Volkswagen's goals with the model was to give it a more aggressive appearance while giving it some stylistic aspects reminiscent of the Type 1. This was an attempt to distance the new model from the New Beetle, produced from 1997 to 2011, which never approached the success of the original Beetle.

The second generation "new" Beetle shares the "A5" (PQ35) platform with the Jetta (A6) and was built alongside the Jetta, Golf Variant at Volkswagen's plant in Puebla, Mexico. It is longer than the previous New Beetle at 4,278 mm (168.4 in) and also has a lower profile, 12 mm (0.5 in) lower than its predecessor, and 88 mm (3.5 in) wider. The trunk is now 310 L (11 cu ft), up from 209 L (7.4 cu ft). A convertible version followed the hatchback for the 2013 model year, first shown at the Los Angeles Auto Show in November 2012 when it also went on sale.

Head of Technical Development for VW, Frank Welsch, indicated at the 2018 Geneva Motor Show that this would be the Beetle's final generation. On 13 September 2018, Volkswagen announced that the Beetle production would end in July 2019. The final third generation Beetle (a denim blue coupe) finished production on 9 July 2019, and was presented on the assembly line the next day. The model was officially retired at a ceremony in Puebla City later that day.

== Launch ==
On 22 November 2010, on the final episode of the Oprah's Favorite Things special, Oprah Winfrey and Volkswagen announced every audience member that day would receive one of the Beetles upon its release in 2011. VW staff gave the audience their special keys to the car. This was followed by a teaser commercial during Super Bowl XLV in February 2011.

To celebrate the global reveal, VW partnered with MTV, to make a debut on three continents on 18 April. The reveal began in Shanghai, China with a MTV Sound System celebration hosted by MTV VJs, followed by MTV World Stage events in Berlin and New York City.

On 18 April 2011, the 2012 model was unveiled as the Volkswagen Beetle, dropping the word "New" from its name. It debuted at the 14th Auto Shanghai and the New York International Auto Show.

During the marketing campaign at Mexico, it was advertised as "The new Vocho" in the "Das Auto" marketing campaign.

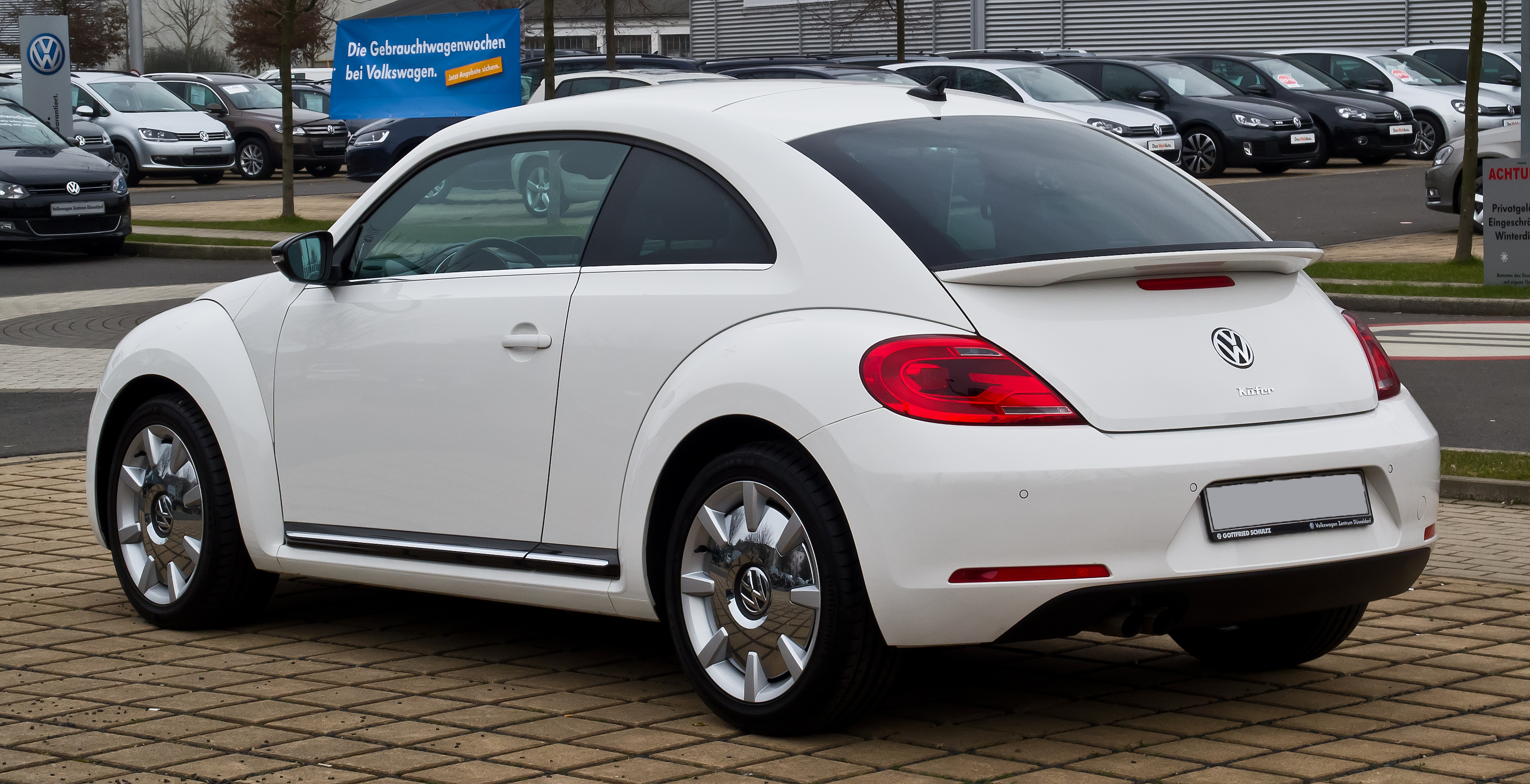
Hatchback

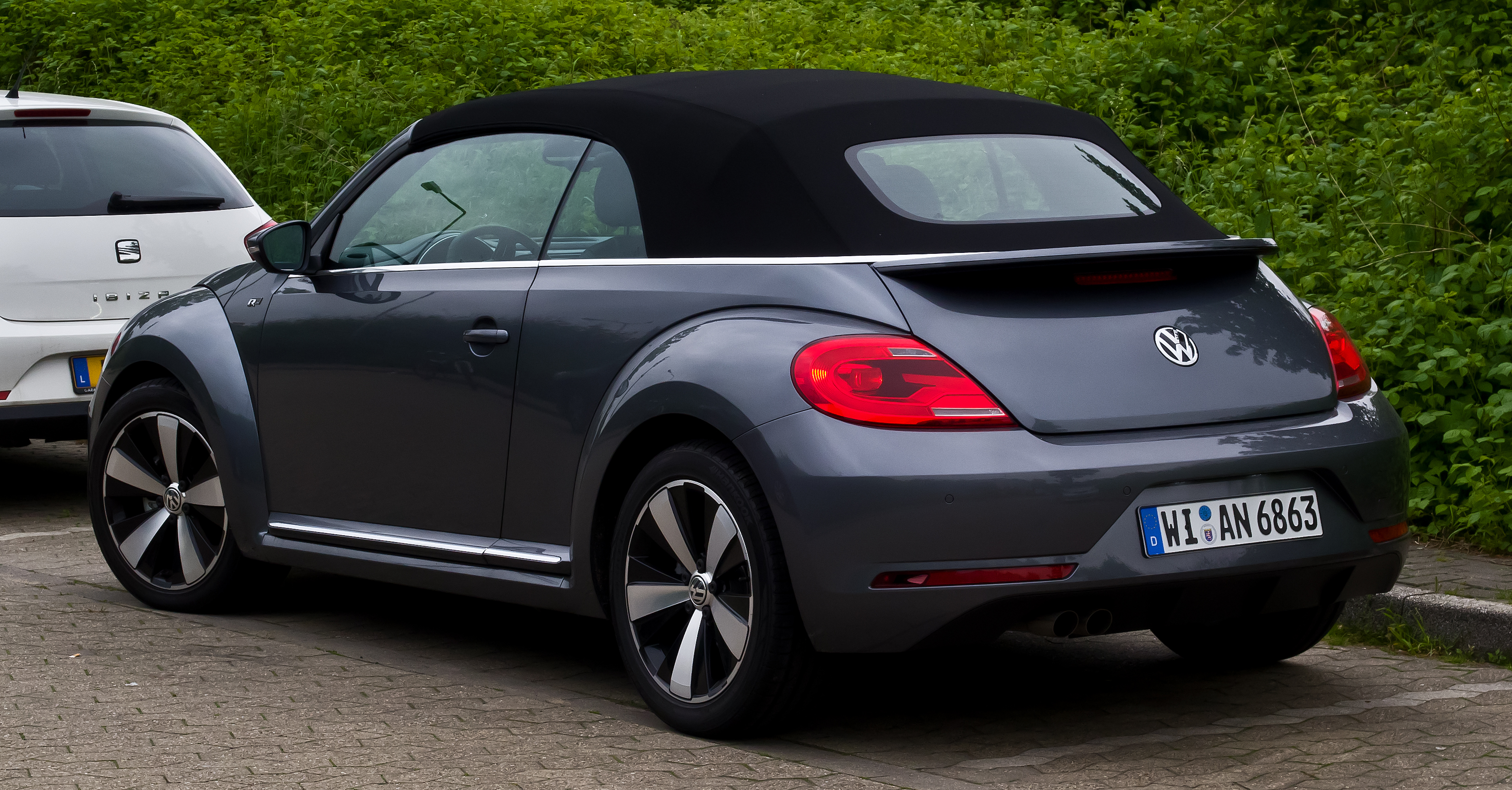
Convertible

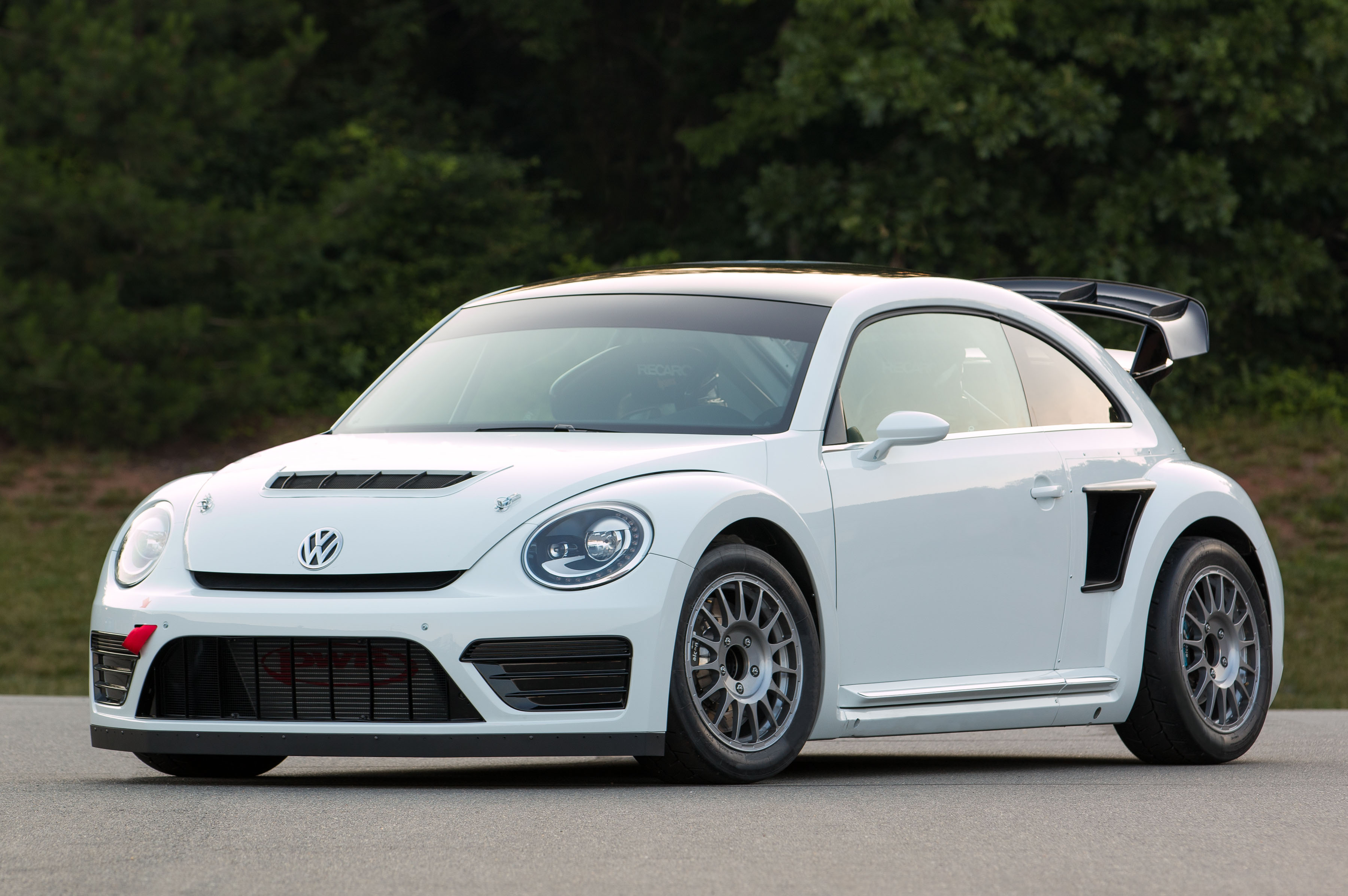
Rallycross Supercar

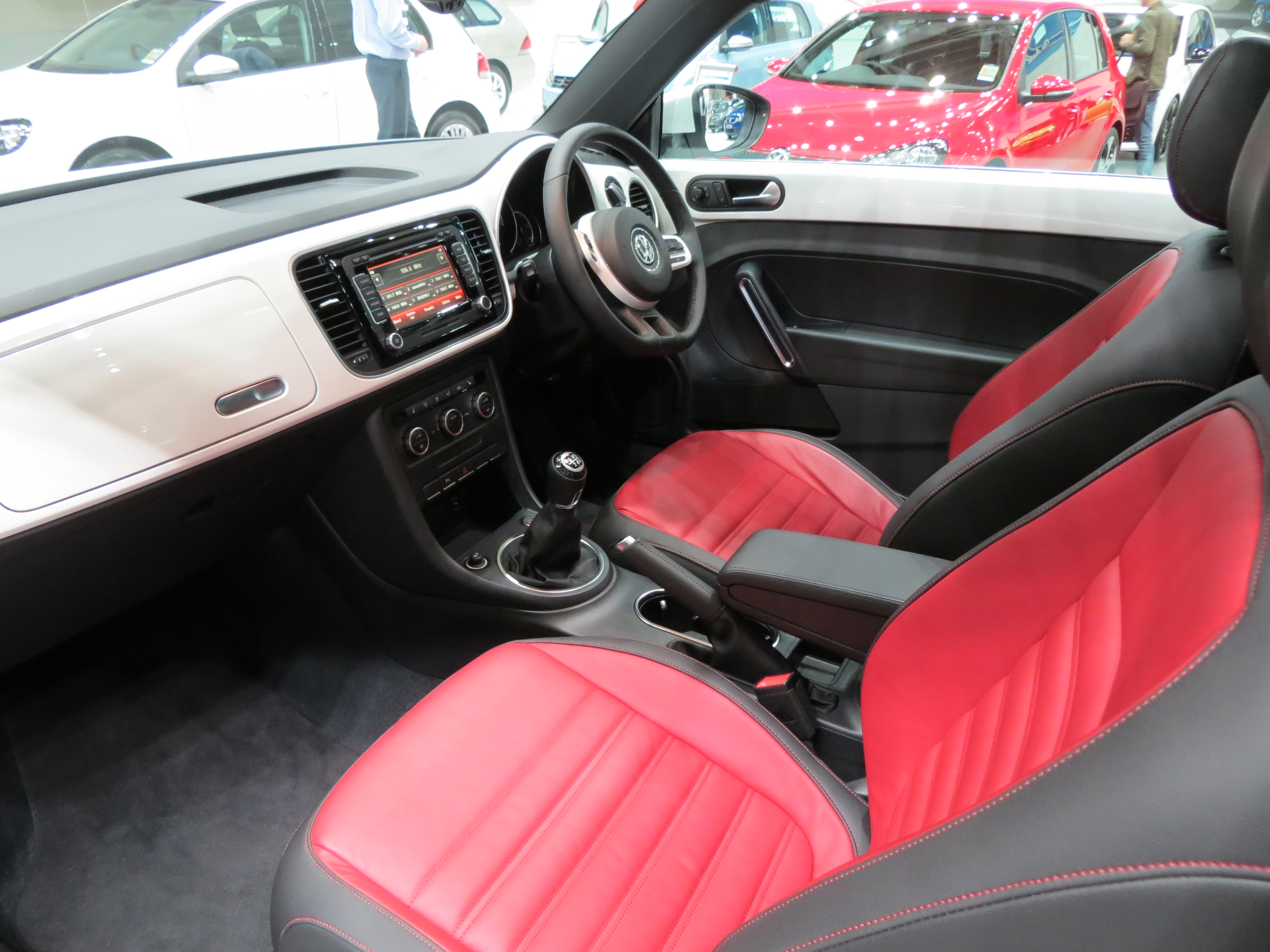
Interior

== Engines ==
The new model retains the front-engine, front-wheel-drive layout of the New Beetle, while improving interior packaging with more room in the rear. Four-cylinder engine options for the European market include 1.2-litre (77 kW (105 PS; 103 hp)), 1.4-litre (118 kW (160 PS; 158 hp)) and 2.0-litre (147 kW (200 PS; 197 hp)) TSI petrol engines, and 1.6-litre (78 kW (106 PS; 105 hp)) and 2.0-litre (103 kW (140 PS; 138 hp)) TDI diesel engines. In addition to the 2.0-litre TSI and TDI engines, base North American Beetles were originally fitted with a (125 kW (170 PS; 168 hp)) straight-five engine (engine code CBTA/CBUA) earlier used on the Golf and Jetta. From 2015 onward, the 2.5L straight-five was phased out in favor of a 1.8L four-cylinder TSI of comparable horsepower ratings but improved torque ratings over the straight-five.

All engines for this model are offered with an option of a six-speed manual transmission or the option of a dual-clutch DSG automatic. In the United States, transmissions on petrol models come with either a five-speed manual or optional six-speed automatic on 2.5/1.8T models, while on the diesel models there is the option of a DSG six-speed dual-clutch transmission.

== Special editions ==
=== Black Turbo launch edition ===
The first special edition of the 2012 Beetle is the Black Turbo launch edition. It was limited to 600 cars on the U.S. market and was the first car available through Volkswagen’s new Vehicle Pre-Order program.

=== Turbo Black ===
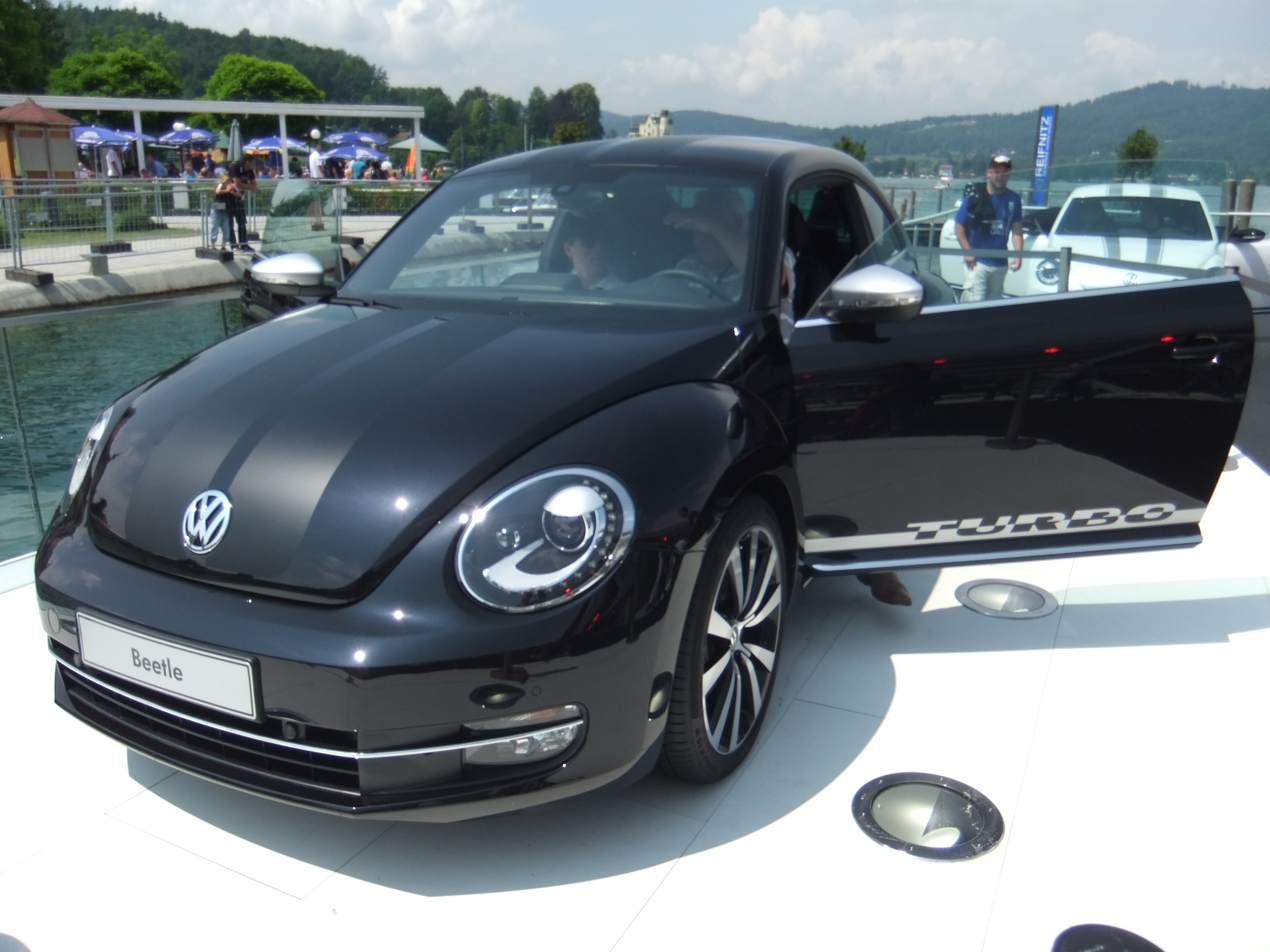
VW Beetle Turbo Black

A Beetle Turbo Black made an appearance at the 30th annual Wörthersee Treffen in June 2011 in Reifnitz, Austria. It was located on the floating barge showcase at the entrance to the show. Other cars on the barge included a Reifnitz Edition GTI and the Touareg Racer.

=== e-Bugster ===
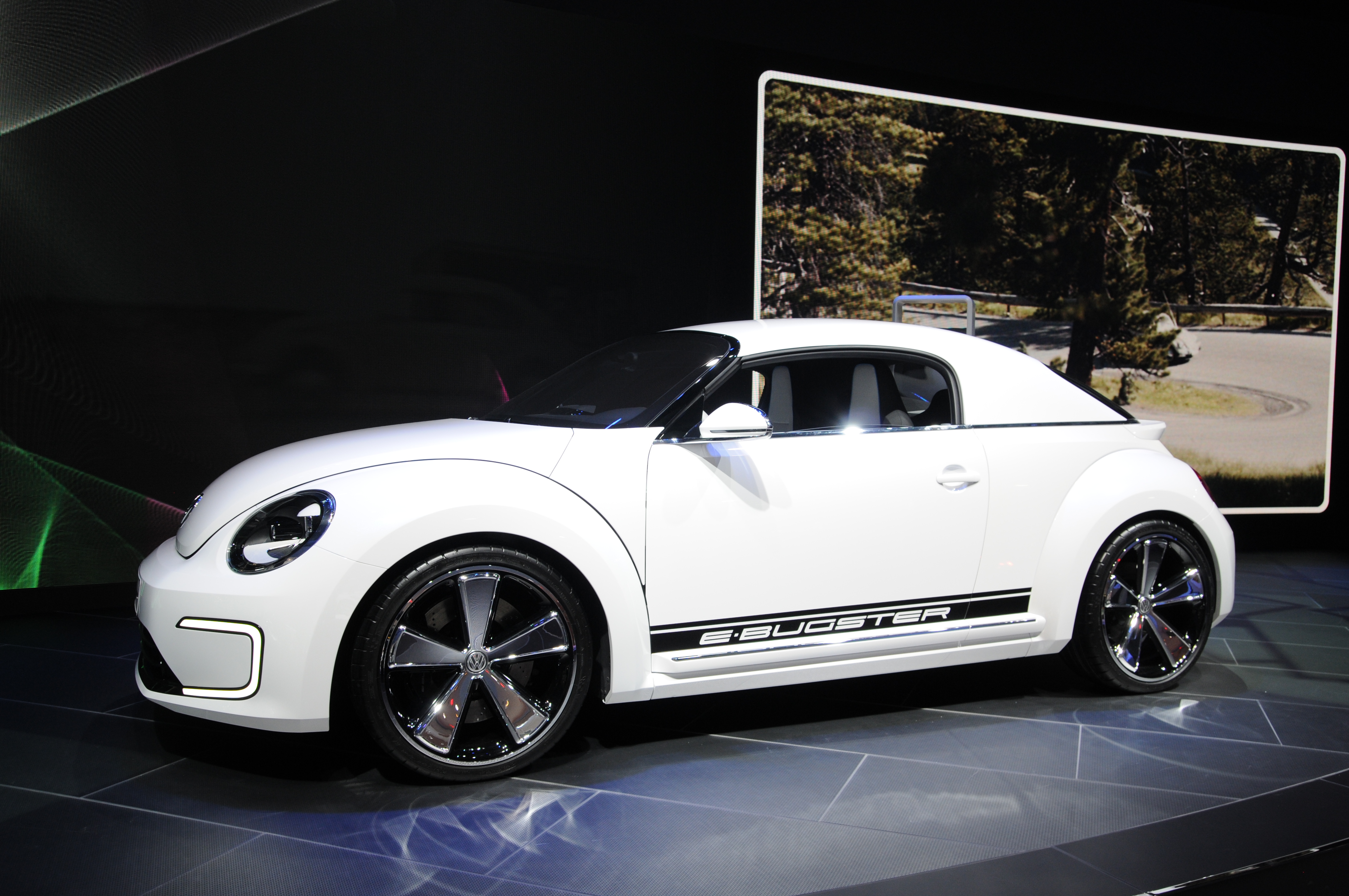
e-Bugster at Geneva, 2012

The e-Bugster was a concept vehicle shown at the North American International Auto Show in January 2012; it is a battery-electric vehicle using a 85 kW (114 hp; 116 PS) motor drawing from a 28.3 kW-hr lithium ion traction battery, for a range of 110 miles (180 km). It previewed the styling for an anticipated convertible edition of the A5; compared to the conventional Beetle, the e-Bugster was 30 mm (1.2 in) wider and the roof was 90 mm (3.5 in) shorter. Unlike other new Beetles, the e-Bugster is a two-seater, true to its Speedster styling, instead of 2+2. Volkswagen allowed journalist Damon Lavrinc to drive the prototype and explained the powertrain components were taken from the contemporary e-Golf that shared the VW PQ35 platform, produced for the California market. Top speed was limited to 30 mph (48 km/h) for the test drive.

=== Fender Edition ===
In 2012, Volkswagen partnered with Fender Musical Instruments Corporation to release a limited edition Beetle for the 2013 model year. The Beetle Fender Edition uses the Beetle Turbo's front fascia and the 2.5L model's 18" disc wheels. Unique exterior features consist of Fender badges and chrome side mirror covers. The interior features a sunburst dashboard panel that pays homage to the Fender Stratocaster, a 400 watt premium audio system with nine speakers, an LCD screen, and a 10-channel amplifier.

=== Xbox special edition ===
In January 2013, an official Xbox special edition was released. It uses the straight-five 2.5 L (170 hp) and was offered in three different colors: Black, White and Silver, all of them with the characteristic Xbox colors, panoramic sunroof, rear spoiler and 18" rims. This special edition was available only for the Mexican market.

=== GSR Limited Edition ===
In February 2013 at the Chicago Auto Show, Volkswagen introduced the Beetle GSR Limited Edition. It is painted in yellow and black and only 3,500 were produced, half of which were sold in the United States, the other half in Europe. This special edition is modelled after the original 1973 special edition Super Beetle dubbed the GSR or, Gelb Schwarz Renner, Yellow Black Racer in English. It was also the only Volkswagen that was offered with a factory boost gauge. The new GSR comes with Volkswagen's new 2.0L turbo four cylinder, this time making an extra 10 horsepower for a total of 210 hp (157 kW).

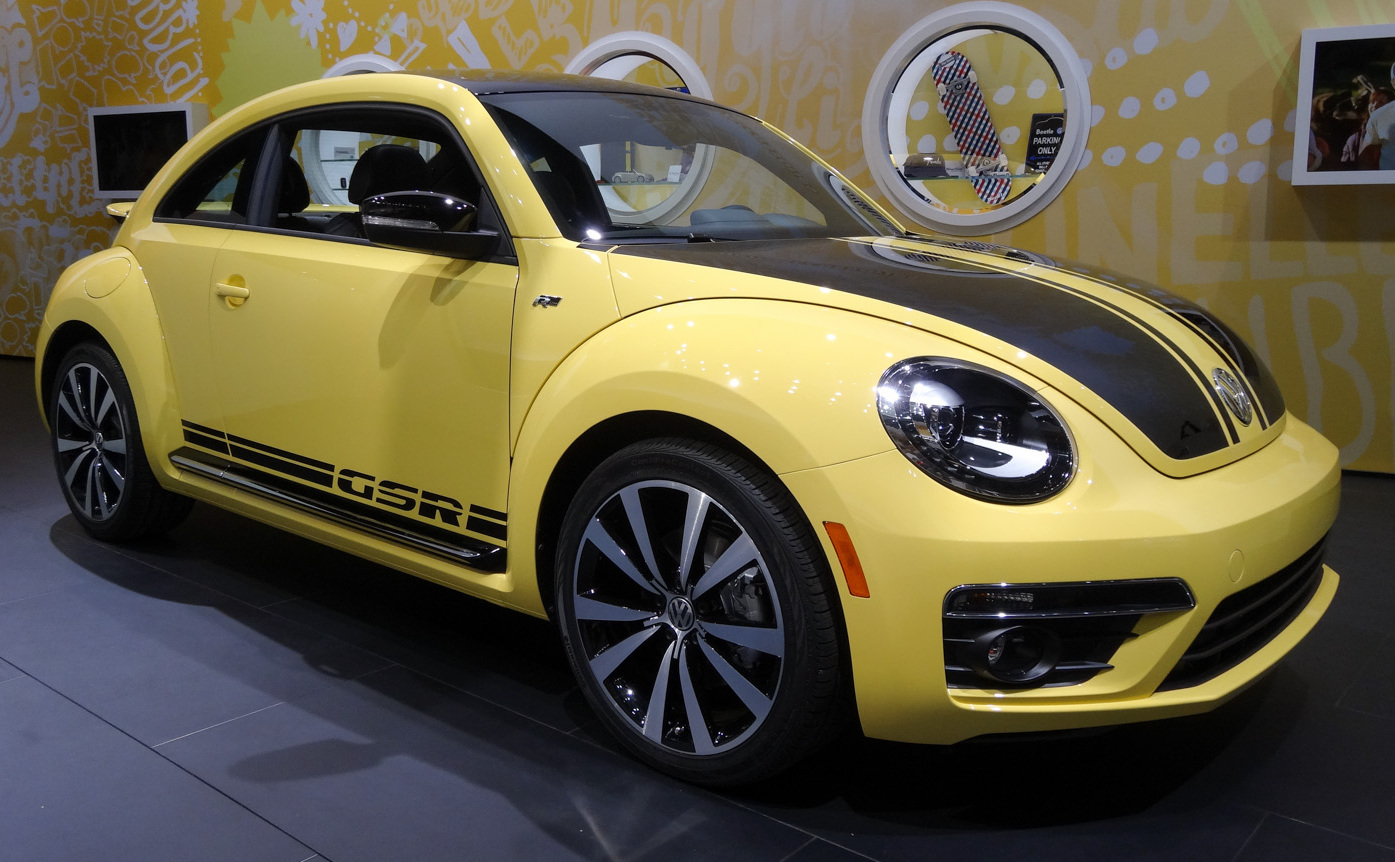
VW Beetle GSR at the 2013 New York International Auto Show

=== R-Line ===
This limited edition trim level was equipped with the Gen 3 210 hp turbo four, a new front fascia and a metal dash plate finished off with 'R' badging all around. Along with increased performance, the engine was expected to get about 8% greater fuel economy, or around 1–2 more miles per gallon. The engine was fitted to all Volkswagens that were previously equipped with the Gen 1 2.0L turbo four.

=== Dune ===
A version with a rugged off-road look called the 'Beetle Dune' went on sale in 2016. Although four-wheel drive is not available, the car's suspension has been raised by 1.4 centimetres (0.55 in) and an exclusive yellow colour is available as an option.

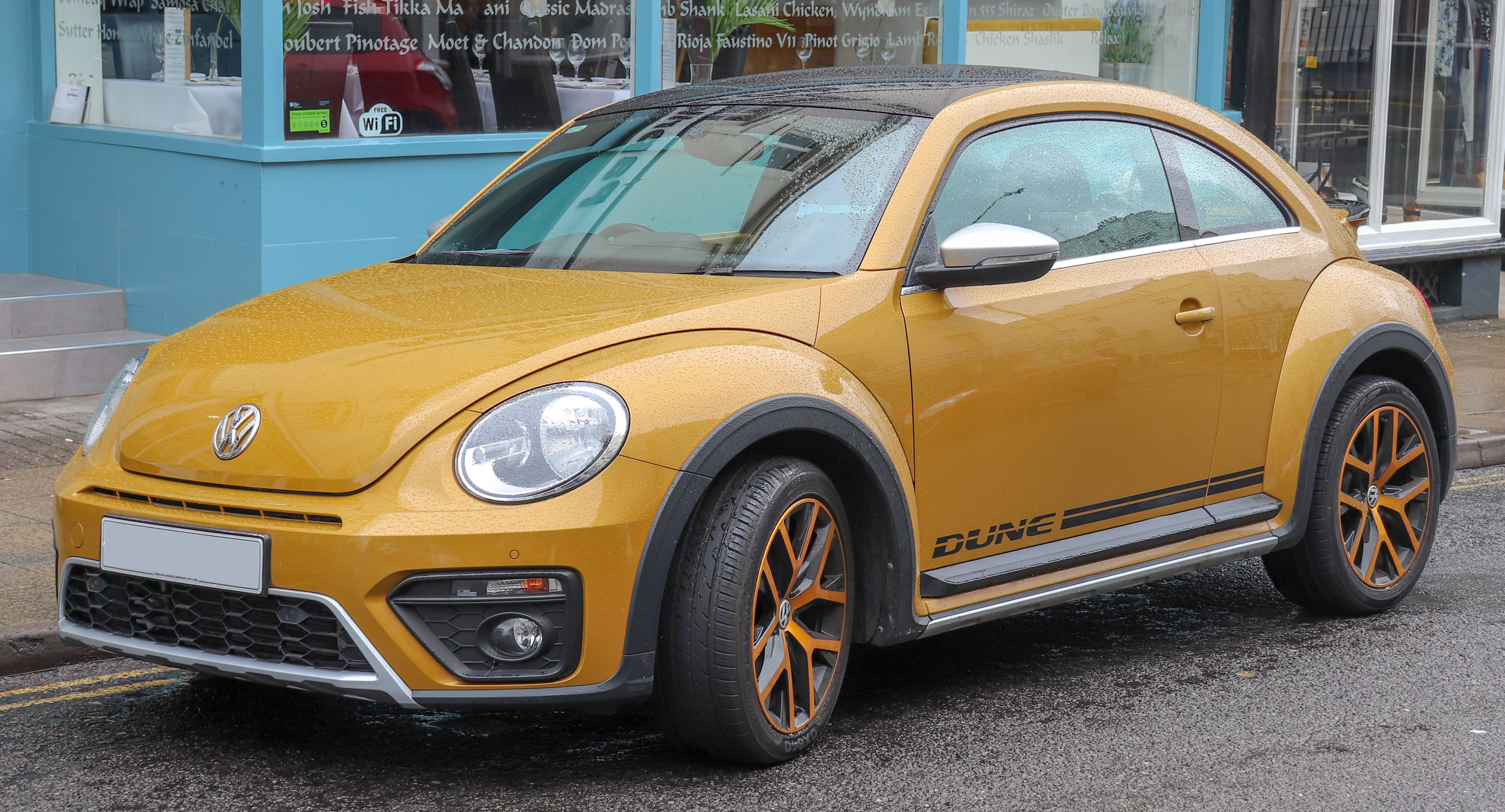
VW Beetle Dune

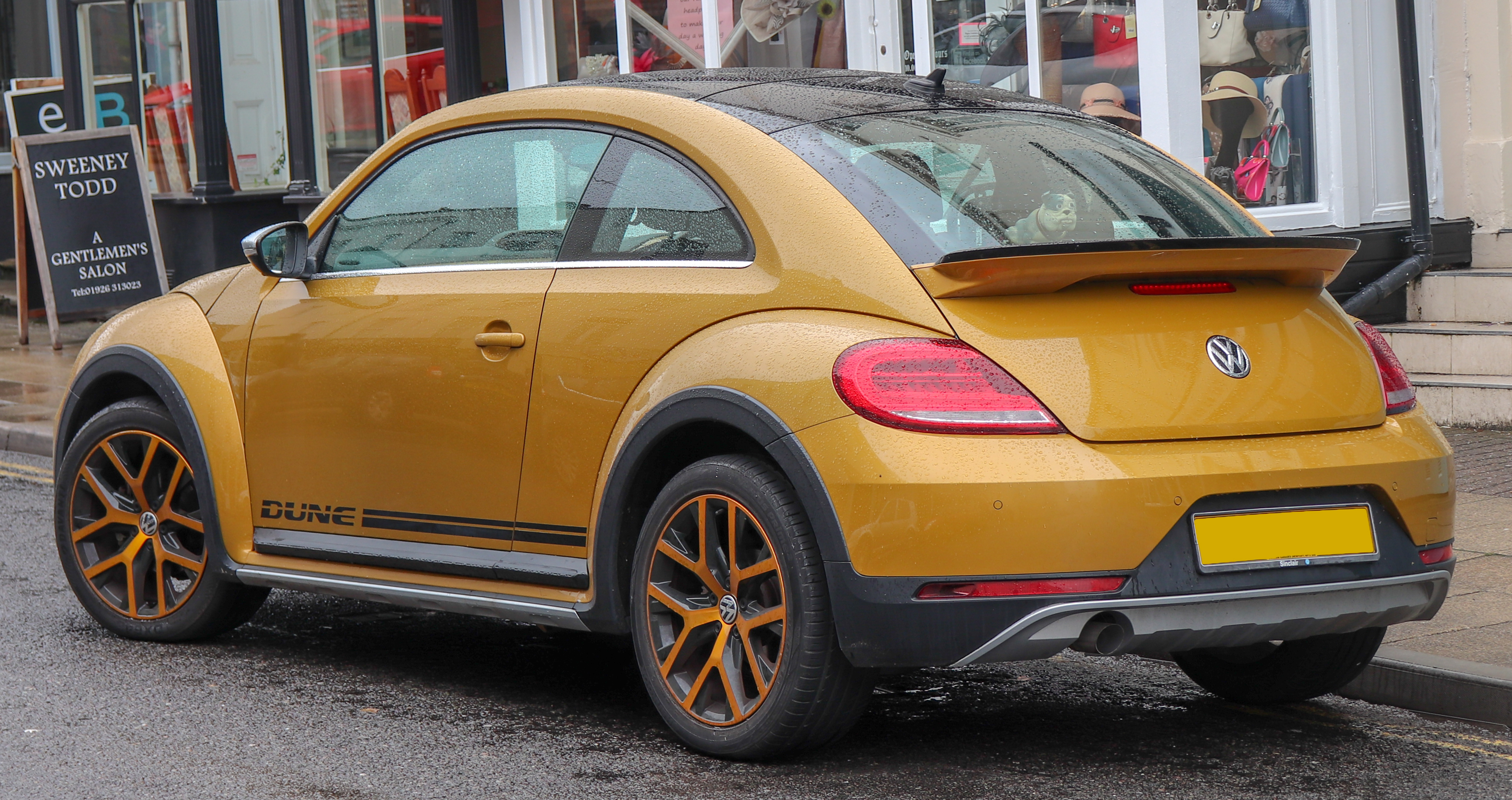
VW Beetle Dune

=== Beetle #PinkBeetle ===
The Beetle #PinkBeetle first began life as a concept car called the “Beetle Pink Edition”, but was renamed to Volkswagen Beetle #PinkBeetle upon production. It is a version with pink accents and exclusive pink color, and was unveiled at the 2015 New York Auto Show alongside the Beetle Wave. It is the only model that has a hashtag in its name. The Beetle #PinkBeetle was produced from 2017 to early 2018.

=== Beetle Wave ===
The Beetle Wave, also known as the Beetle Surf, is the concept stage of the Beetle Coast, with two prototypes being unveiled at the 2015 New York Auto Show and the 2015 Frankfurt Auto Show. It is a special version of the Beetle with 2 fully-wooden surfboards, an exclusive orange accent and “habanero orange” color, a houndstooth interior, real wood garnish for the dashboard, chrome mirror caps, 19-inch “Tornado”-design wheels, and Michigan license plates that read “NEW YORK CITY - BTL SRF”. The car pays homage to the Volkswagen Type 2 (T1), as both vehicles were designed for summertime enjoyment. Standard trim options include a soft convertible top.

=== Beetle Coast ===
The Beetle Coast is the production version of the Beetle Wave concept car, officially released on January 1, 2018. It was offered as a convertible or as a coupe with a panoramic sunroof, and was available in Coast-exclusive Deep Sea Teal paint. Coast-specific details include surfboard wood dash accents, houndstooth interior (carried over from its concept stage) and disk-design hubcaps instead of the “Tornado”-design wheels from its concept. The Beetle Coast was designed to compete with the Honda Civic, Hyundai Elantra, and the Mazda3.

=== 53 Edition ===
The 53 Edition is a version of the Beetle with red, white and blue stripes running from front to back vertically, as well as 53s on the doors, hood and trunk, made to resemble the paint job of Herbie The Love Bug. It was sold exclusively in Spain.

=== Final Edition ===
The Final Edition is the final version of the model sold in 2019, with two colors that were tributes to past Beetle models: Safari Uni Beige and Stonewashed Blue. Three other colors offered are Platinum Grey, Pure White, and Deep Black Pearl. The Final Edition came in both coupe and convertible body styles. There are two trims: SE and SEL.

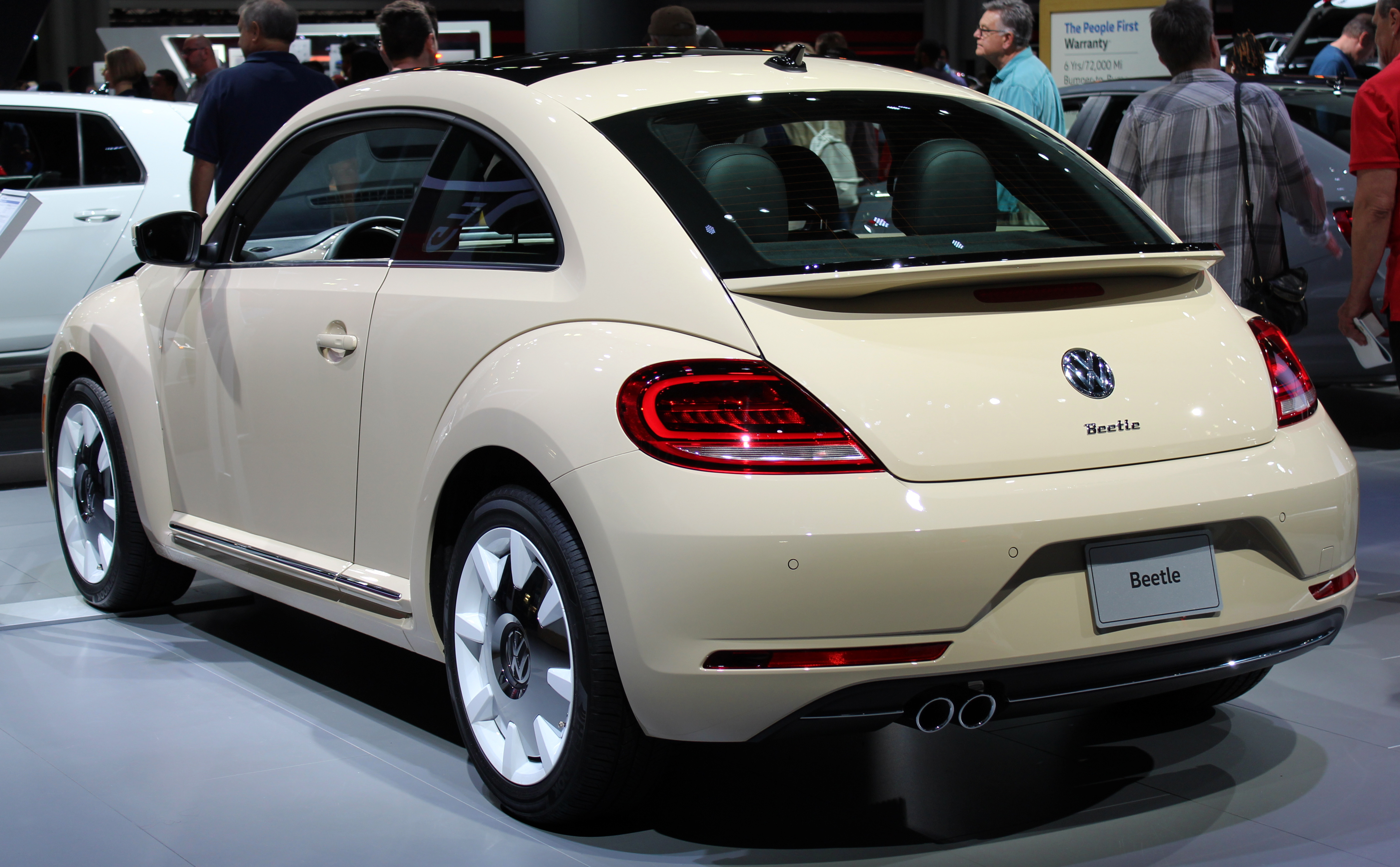
VW Beetle Final Edition

== Sales ==
The previous generation New Beetle Convertible was sold alongside the Beetle Coupe (A5) in 2012. An all-new A5 based Beetle Convertible replaced the New Beetle Convertible for the 2013 model year.

Calendar year	Global (production)	U.S. sales			
Calendar year	Global (production)	Coupe	Convertible	New Beetle Convertible	Total
2012	107,939	28,654	-	520	29,174
2013	109,517	25,084	18,050	-	43,134
2014	91,464	17,414	11,768	-	29,182
2015	64,035	13,025	9,642	-	22,667
2016	61,940	9,830	5,837	-	15,667
2017	59,483	8,627	6,539	-	15,166
2018	37,846	8,636	5,775	-	14,411
2019	20,580	7,704	9,511	-	17,215
Total	552,804	118,965	67,122	520	186,607
