= Arthur Beales (photographer) =

Canadian photographer (1871–1955)

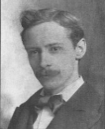
- Born: 1871; Brentwood, Ontario
- Died: 1955 (aged 83–84)
- Occupation: photographer
- Known for: took over 17,000 historic photos for his employer, the Toronto Harbour Commission

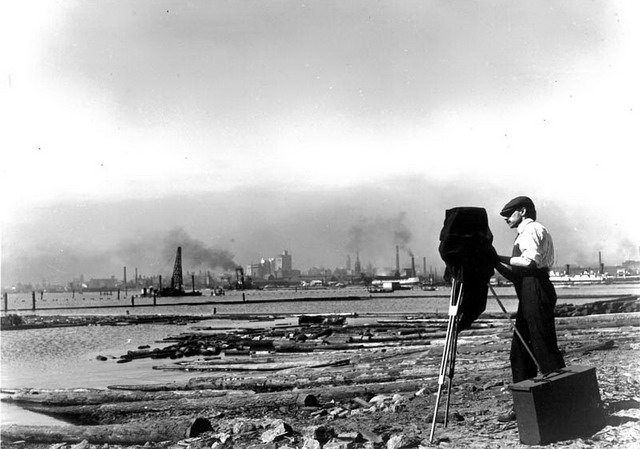
Arthur Beales, the Toronto Harbour Commission's first official photographer, in 1914.

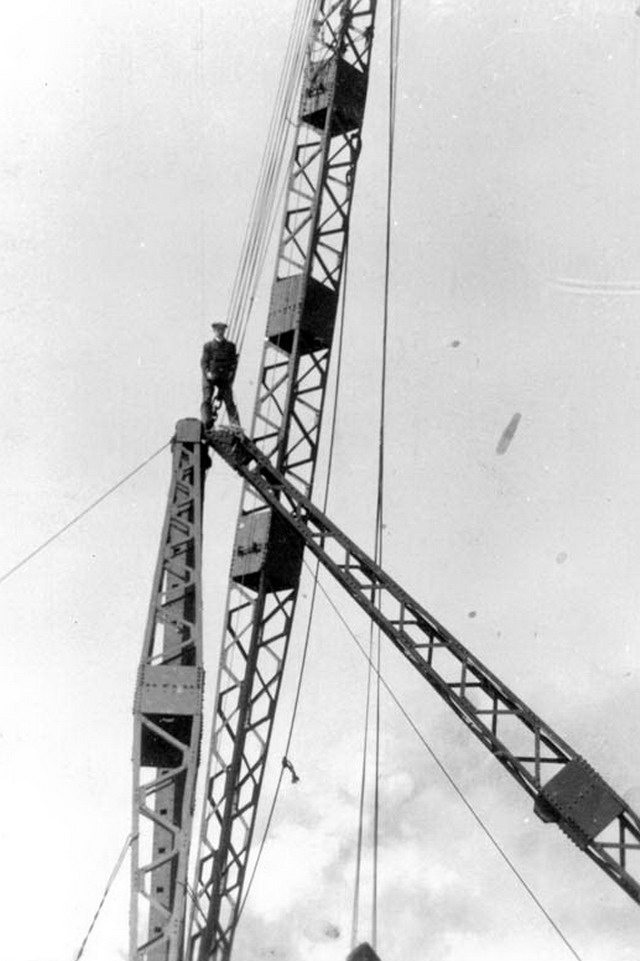
Arthur Beales, taking pictures from atop a derrick, in 1915.

Arthur Beales (1871–1955) was the first official photographer for the Toronto Harbour Commission, first hired in 1914, and only retiring in 1951. His job was physically challenging, as he climbed cranes and towers, carrying the heavy and inconvenient cameras of the time.

When his car was hit by a train, in 1920, Beales was blinded in one eye, and had to use clever techniques to compensate for his loss of depth perception. Kevin Plummer, writing in the Torontoist, quotes an official biography that said Beales felt the facial scarring left from his accident had closed off the option of working as a portrait photographer.
