= Volkswagen New Beetle =

Compact car

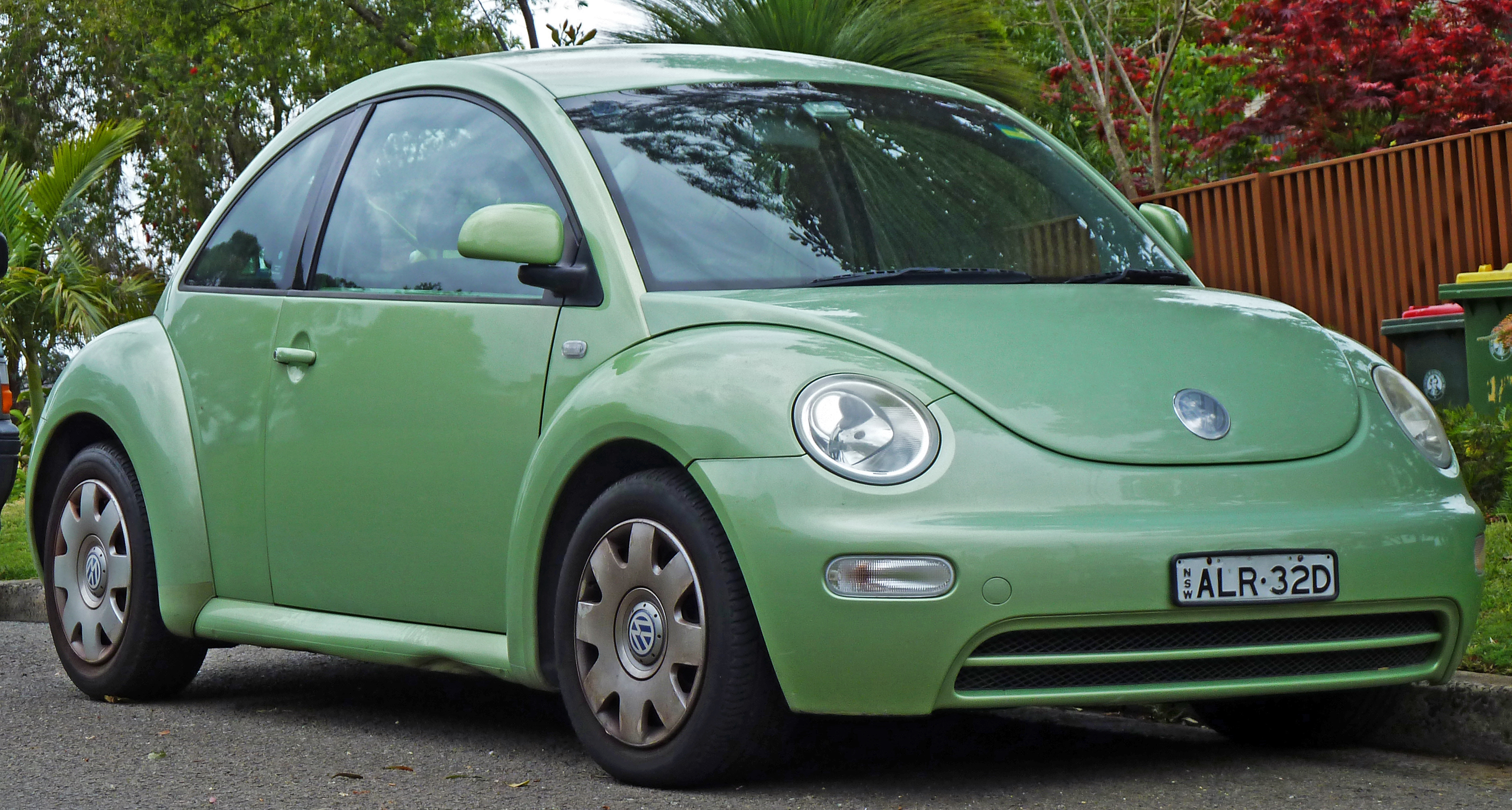
- 1998–2005 New Beetle (pre-facelift)

Overview
- Manufacturer: Volkswagen
- Also called: Volkswagen Beetle (Mexico); Volkswagen Bjalla (Iceland)
- Production: October 1997 – July 2011
- Model years: 1998–2010
- Assembly: Germany: Wolfsburg (Wolfsburg Volkswagen plant: 1997–1999); Mexico: Puebla (Volkswagen de México S.A. de C.V.: 1999–2011); Vietnam: Hai Phong (CKD by World Auto: 2011–2019)
- Designer: J Mays (1993, 1995), Freeman Thomas (1993, 1995), Peter Schreyer (1993)

Body and chassis
- Class: Compact car (C)
- Body style: 3-door hatchback 2-door convertible
- Layout: Front engine, front-wheel drive, 4motion all-wheel drive (RSi)
- Platform: Volkswagen Group A4 (PQ34) platform
- Related: Audi A3 Mk1; Audi TT Mk1; SEAT León Mk1; SEAT Toledo Mk2; Škoda Octavia Mk1; Volkswagen Golf Mk4; Volkswagen Jetta/Bora

Powertrain
- Engine: Petrol engines: 1.4 L I4 16 valve 1.6 L I4; 1.8 L I4 Turbocharged; 2.0 L I4; 2.3 L VR5 20 valve 2.5 L I5 20 valve 3.2 L VR6 24 valve (RSI); Diesel engine: 1.9 L I4 TDI
- Transmission: 5-speed manual 6-speed manual 4-speed automatic (01M); 6-speed automatic tiptronic (09G); 6-speed DSG dual-clutch automatic

Dimensions
- Wheelbase: 2,515 mm (99.0 in)
- Length: 4,129 mm (162.6 in)
- Width: 1,721 mm (67.8 in)
- Height: 1,511 mm (59.5 in) (1998–2000), 1,498 mm (59.0 in) (hatch 2003–2011), 1,501 mm (59.1 in) (convertible)

Chronology
- Predecessor: Volkswagen Beetle
- Successor: Volkswagen Beetle (A5)

The Volkswagen New Beetle is a compact car introduced by Volkswagen in 1998, drawing heavy inspiration from the exterior design of the original Volkswagen Beetle. Unlike the original Beetle, the New Beetle has its engine in the front driving the front wheels, with luggage storage in the rear. It received a facelift in 2005 and was in production until 2011, nearly fourteen years since its introduction.

In the 2012 model year, a new Beetle model, the Beetle (A5), replaced the New Beetle. Various versions of this model continued to be produced in Puebla, Mexico, until the final car left the assembly line on 10 July 2019.

== History ==
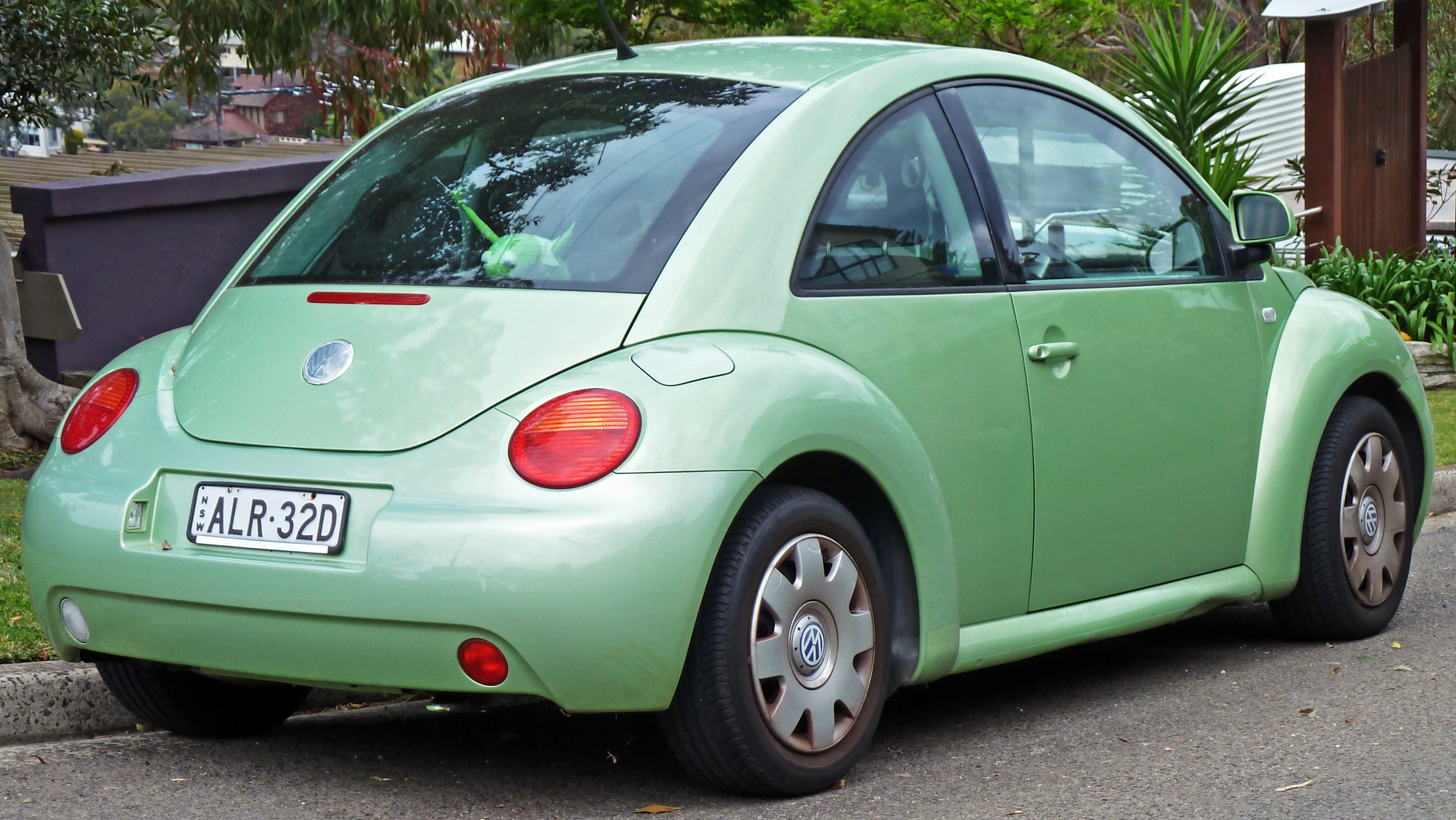
Coupe (pre-facelift)

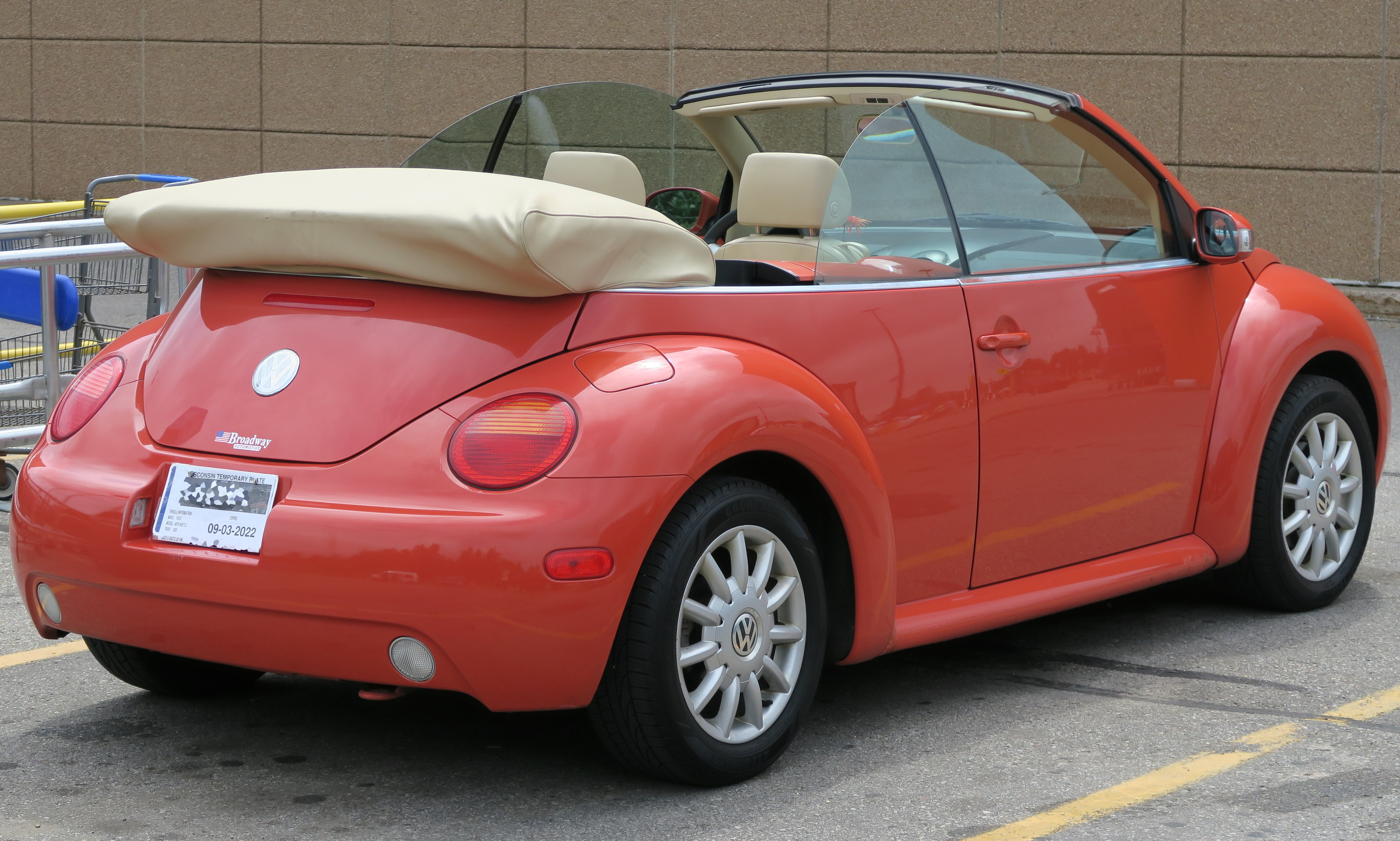
Cabriolet (pre-facelift)

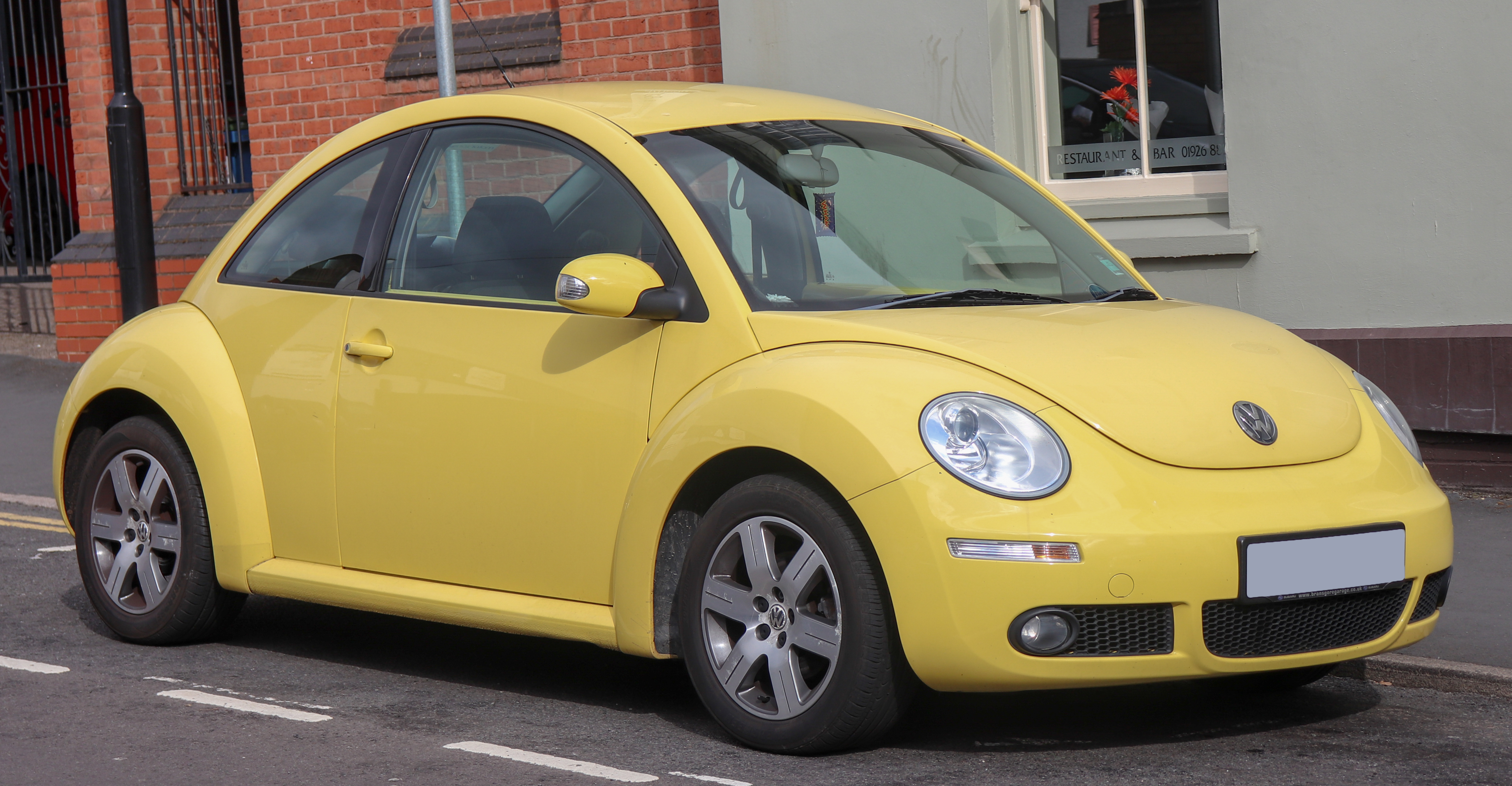

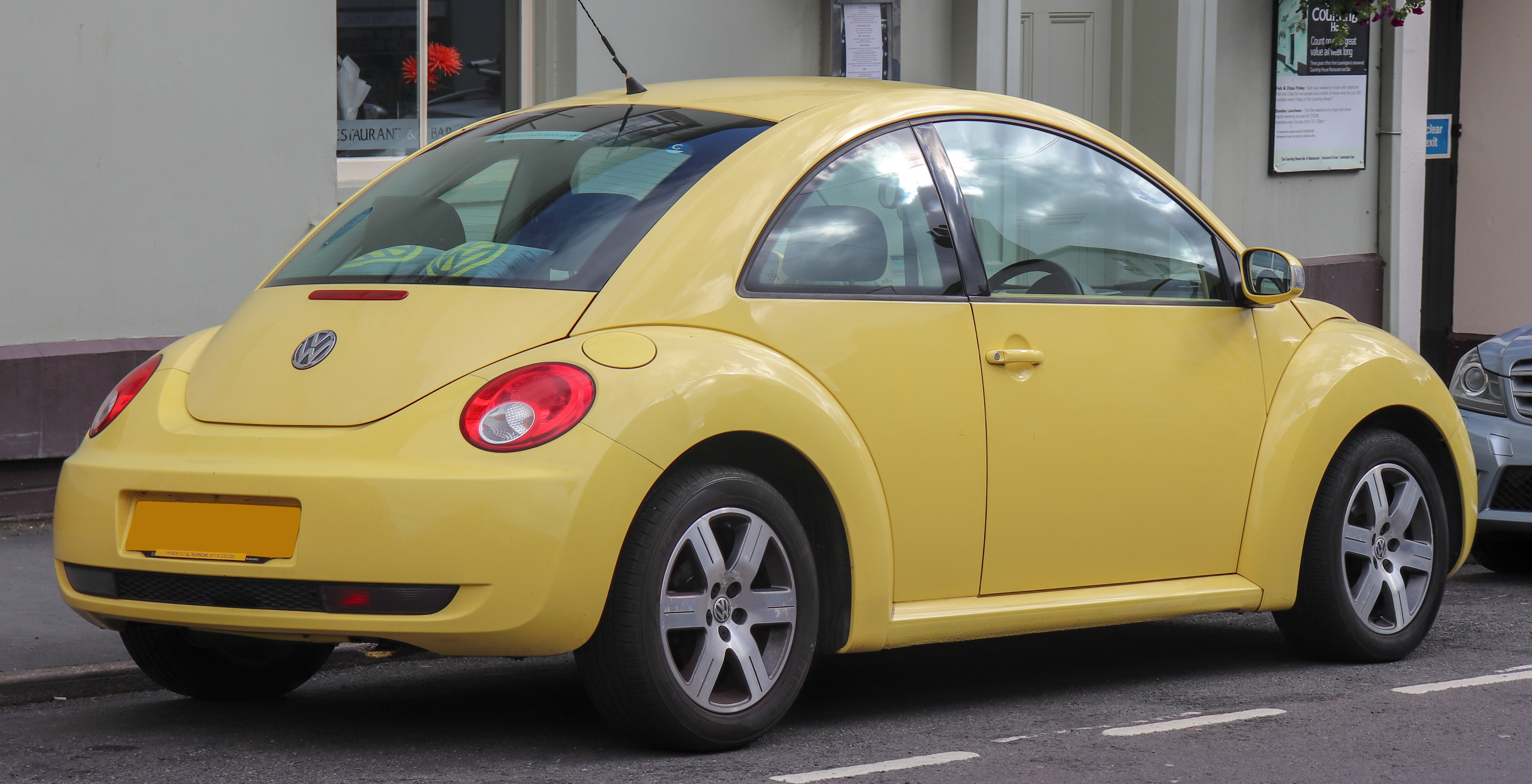
Coupe (facelift)

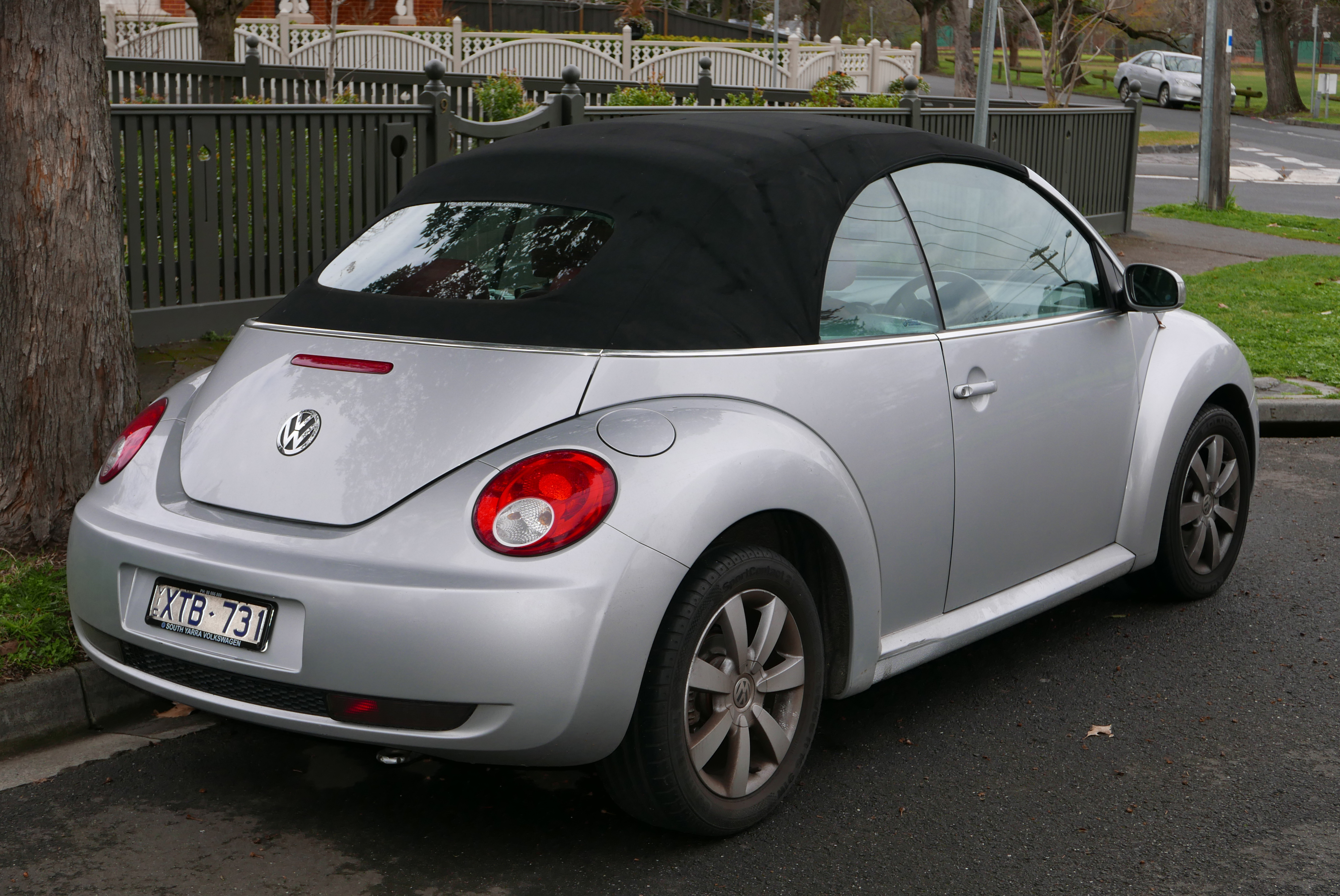
Cabriolet (facelift)

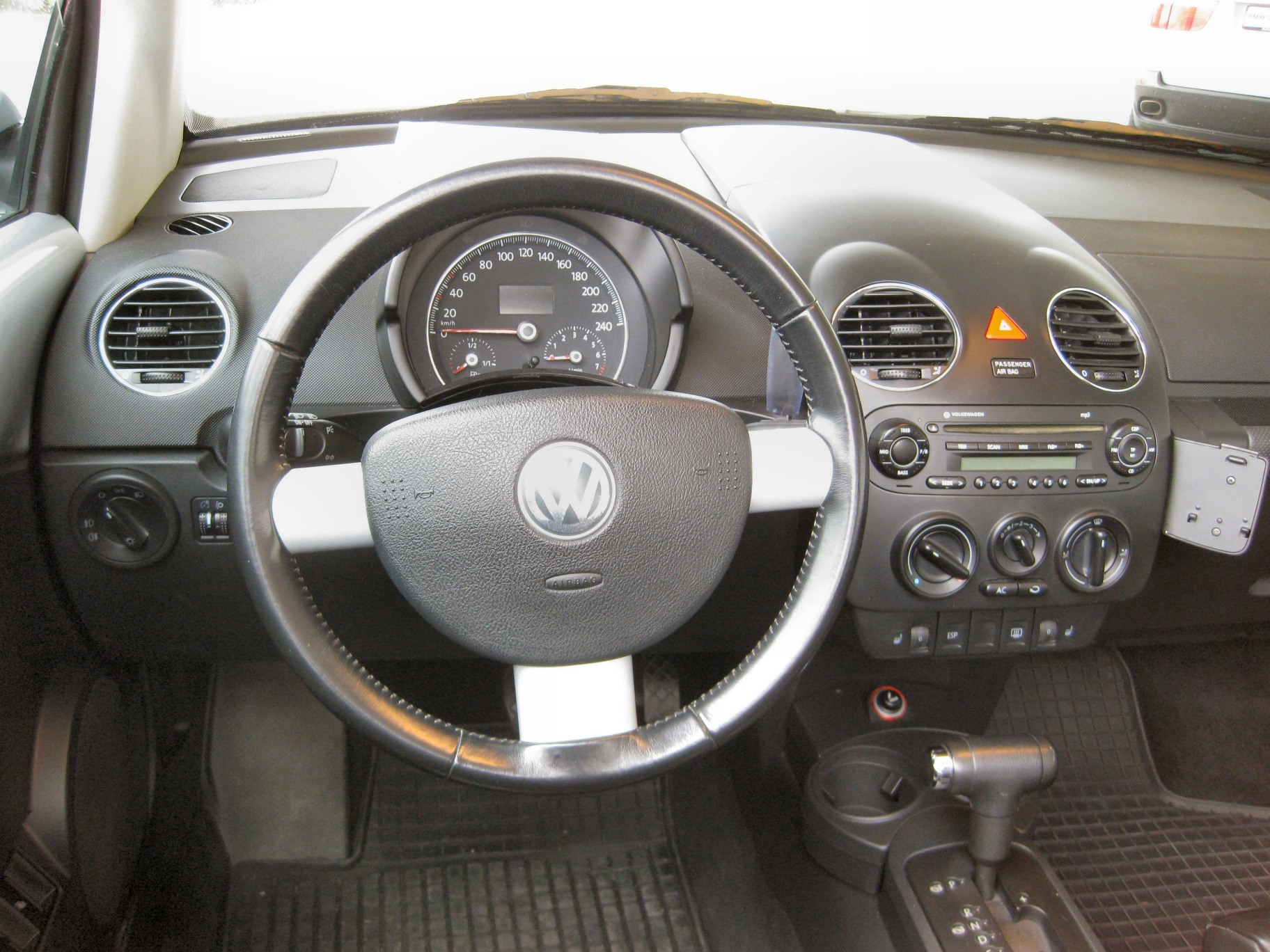
Interior

At the 1994 North American International Auto Show, Volkswagen unveiled the Concept One, a "retro"-themed concept car with a resemblance to the original Volkswagen Beetle. Designed by J Mays and Freeman Thomas at the company's California design studio, the concept car was based on the platform of the Volkswagen Polo. A red cabriolet concept was featured at the Geneva Motor Show, also in 1994.

Production design approval was reached in mid-1995, with a design freeze resulting in 22 months of development time for production. In October 1995, the Volkswagen Concept Two was shown at the Tokyo Motor Show, essentially an early preview of the production model due in early 1998.

Strong public reaction to the Concept One convinced the company that it should develop a production version which was launched as the New Beetle in 1997 for the 1998 model-year, based on the fourth-generation Golf's larger PQ34 platform. The New Beetle is related to the original only in name and appearance (including the absence of a car emblem script with the exception of the VW logo). For the 1998 model year, only the TDI compression-ignition engine was turbocharged; the spark-ignition engines were only naturally aspirated. In June 1999, Volkswagen introduced the 1.8T, which was the first turbocharged spark-ignition engine offered for the New Beetle. Volkswagen created a web site dedicated specifically to the 1.8T. A convertible was added for the 2003 model year to replace the Volkswagen Cabrio. However, the New Beetle Convertible was never offered with a compression-ignition engine in North America. The third-generation Beetle Convertible, the successor to the New Beetle Convertible, was offered with the TDI compression-ignition engine in the US, making it possibly the only diesel convertible car offered in North America.

The New Beetle carries many design similarities with the original VW Beetle: separate fenders, vestigial running boards, sloping headlamps, and large round taillights, as well as a high rounded roofline. It was assembled in VW's Puebla factory in Mexico.

In June 2005, Volkswagen announced a facelift of the New Beetle, featuring revised bumpers, wheels, lamps, VW emblems, sharper lines and a different interior. It was introduced in the US for the 2006 model year.

== Specifications ==
- Dimension:
  - Length: 4,081–4,129 mm (160.7–162.6 in)
  - Width: 1,721 mm (67.8 in)
  - Height: 1,498 mm (59.0 in)
  - Wheelbase: 2,515 mm (99.0 in)
  - Curb weight: 1,230 kg (2,712 lb)
  - Luggage volume: 12 cu ft (339.8 L)
  - Luggage volume with rear seat folded: 27.1 cu ft (767.4 L)
- Max speed: 161–225 km/h (110-140 mph)
- Acceleration (0–100 km/h | 0-62.5 mph): 6.7-14.6 sec

=== Body styles ===
Chassis code	Typ 1C	Typ 9C	Typ 1Y
Body type	Coupé	Coupé	Convertible
Region(s)	North America	Europe and others	World
Years	1998–2010	1997–	2003–

=== Engine choices ===
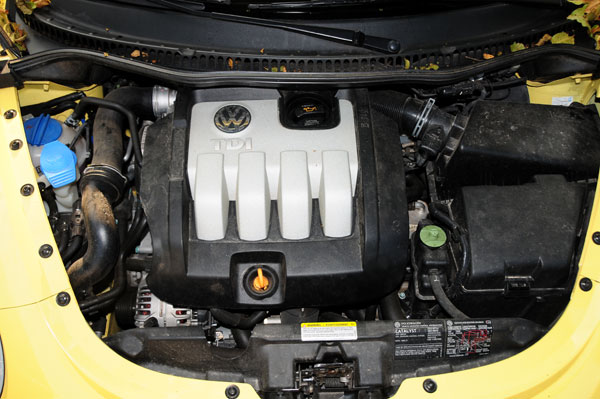
TDI diesel engine in 2006 New Beetle

Model	engine code(s)	engine type	max power at rpm	max torque at rpm	years
Petrol engines
1.4	BCA	1,390 cc (1.39 L; 85 cu in) I4 DOHC 16V	75 PS (55 kW; 74 hp) at 5,000	126 N⋅m (93 lb⋅ft) at 3,800	2001–
1.6	AWH	1,595 cc (1.595 L; 97.3 cu in) I4 SOHC 8V	101 PS (74 kW; 100 hp) at 5,600	145 N⋅m (107 lb⋅ft) at 3,800	1999–2000
1.6	AYD / BFS	1,595 cc (1.595 L; 97.3 cu in) I4 SOHC 8V	102 PS (75 kW; 101 hp) at 5,600	148 N⋅m (109 lb⋅ft) at 3,800	2006– 2009
1.8 T	AGU	1,781 cc (1.781 L; 108.7 cu in) I4 DOHC 20V turbo	150 PS (110 kW; 148 hp) at 5,700	210 N⋅m (155 lb⋅ft) at 1,750-4,600	1998–2000
1.8 T	APH /AVC /AWC /AWU /AWV /BKF	1,781 cc (1.781 L; 108.7 cu in) I4 DOHC 20V turbo	150 PS (110 kW; 148 hp) at 5,800	220 N⋅m (162 lb⋅ft) at 2,000-4,200	1999–2002
1.8 T	AUQ	1,781 cc (1.781 L; 108.7 cu in) I4 DOHC 20V turbo	180 PS (132 kW; 178 hp)	235 N⋅m (173 lb⋅ft)	2001–2002
1.8 T	AWP	1,781 cc (1.781 L; 108.7 cu in) I4 DOHC 20V turbo	180 PS (132 kW; 178 hp) at 5,500	235 N⋅m (173 lb⋅ft) at 1,950-5,000	2002–2004
2.0	ABA	1,984 cc (1.984 L; 121.1 cu in) I4 SOHC 8V	115 PS (85 kW; 113 hp) at 5,400	122 N⋅m (90 lb⋅ft) at 2,800	1998–2003
2.0	APK / AQY	1,984 cc (1.984 L; 121.1 cu in) I4 SOHC 8V	116 PS (85 kW; 114 hp) at 5,200	170 N⋅m (125 lb⋅ft) at 2,400	1998–2001
2.0	AZJ /BDC /BEJ /BER /BEV /BGD /BHP	1,984 cc (1.984 L; 121.1 cu in) I4 SOHC 8V	116 PS (85 kW; 114 hp) at 5,200	172 N⋅m (127 lb⋅ft) at 3,200	2001–2003
2.3 V5	AQN	2,324 cc (2.324 L; 141.8 cu in) VR5 DOHC 20V	170 PS (125 kW; 168 hp) at 6,200	220 N⋅m (162 lb⋅ft) at 3,300	2000–2005
2.5	BGP	2,480 cc (2.48 L; 151 cu in) I5 DOHC 20V	150 PS (110 kW; 148 hp)	209 N⋅m (154 lb⋅ft)	2006–
2.5	BPR /BPS	2,480 cc (2.48 L; 151 cu in) I5 DOHC 20V	150 PS (110 kW; 148 hp) at 5,000	228 N⋅m (168 lb⋅ft) at 3,750	2006–
3.2 RSI	AXJ	3,189 cc (3.189 L; 194.6 cu in) VR6 DOHC 24V	225 PS (165 kW; 222 hp)	320 N⋅m (236 lb⋅ft)	2000–2003
Diesel engines
1.9 TDI	AGR / ALH	1,896 cc (1.896 L; 115.7 cu in) I4 SOHC 8V turbo (Injection pump)	90 PS (66 kW; 89 hp) at 4,000	210 N⋅m (155 lb⋅ft) at 1,900	1998–2004
1.9 TDI	ATD /AXR /BEW	1,896 cc (1.896 L; 115.7 cu in) I4 SOHC 8V turbo (Pumpe-Düse)	101 PS (74 kW; 100 hp) at 4,000	240 N⋅m (177 lb⋅ft) at 1,800-2400	2000–2005
1.9 TDI	BJB / BKC / BXE / BLS	1,896 cc (1.896 L; 115.7 cu in) I4 SOHC 8V turbo	105 PS (77 kW; 104 hp) at 4,000	240 N⋅m (177 lb⋅ft) at 1,800	2003–
1.9 TDI	BSW	1,896 cc (1.896 L; 115.7 cu in) I4 SOHC 8V turbo (Pumpe-Düse)	105 PS (77 kW; 104 hp) at 4,000	240 N⋅m (177 lb⋅ft) at 1,800-2,200	2005–2006

=== Safety ===
The New Beetle achieved five stars in the 2011 Euro NCAP tests compared to four stars in the 2000 Euro NCAP tests scoring 25 points (33 to reach five stars).

The Insurance Institute for Highway Safety (IIHS) gave the New Beetle a Good overall score in their frontal crash test. 2004 models come standard with side airbags; however, the IIHS rated the Beetle Poor in their side impact test.

ANCAP test results Volkswagen Beetle 3 door hatch (2001)
Test	Score
Overall	4 /5 stars
Frontal offset	10.45/16
Side impact	16/16
Pole	Not Assessed
Seat belt reminders	0/3
Whiplash protection	Not Assessed
Pedestrian protection	Marginal
Electronic stability control	Not Assessed

ANCAP test results Volkswagen Beetle all variants (2013)
Test	Score
Overall	5 /5 stars
Frontal offset	14.28/16
Side impact	16/16
Pole	2/2
Seat belt reminders	3/3
Whiplash protection	Good
Pedestrian protection	Adequate
Electronic stability control	Standard

=== United States models ===
Engine choices include the 115 hp (86 kW) 2.0 L inline-four for the base model, the 100 hp (75 kW) 1.9 L TDI turbodiesel inline-four (discontinued after the 2006 model year due to more stringent emissions requirements), and the 150 hp (112 kW) 1.8 L turbo inline-four for the Turbo and Sport models.

The Turbo S model (sold 2002–2004) included the 1.8 L turbo but with 180 hp (134 kW). It also included a sport suspension, six-speed manual transmission, aluminum interior trim, revised front/rear fascias, and bigger wheels and tires. A close relative of the Turbo S was the 2002–2004 Color Concept. This limited edition variant was available in limited exterior colors, with interior door panel inserts, seat inserts, floor mat piping, and wheel opening inserts color-matched to the exterior paint. Wheel color inserts, diameter, and style varied with model year. It came standard with the 150 hp (112 kW) 1.8 turbo gasoline engine, 5-speed manual gearbox, speed-activated rear spoiler, power windows/sunroof/door locks, heated leather seats, and fog lamps.

All 1.8L Turbo and Turbo S inline-four models were equipped with a retractable rear spoiler which was not available on the 1.9 L TDI inline-4, 2.0 L inline-four and 2.5 L inline-five models.

For the 2006 model, the exterior was slightly redesigned with more angular bumpers and wheel wells, and these models were fitted with the 2.5 L 5-cylinder engine with 150 hp (112 kW) which was also fitted on the Rabbit and Jetta, later becoming the sole engine option. The New Beetle would not be given the upgraded 2.5 L engine (engine code CBTA/CBUA) that 2008 and later Jettas and Rabbits received.

== Special editions ==
=== Beetle RSi (2001–2003) ===
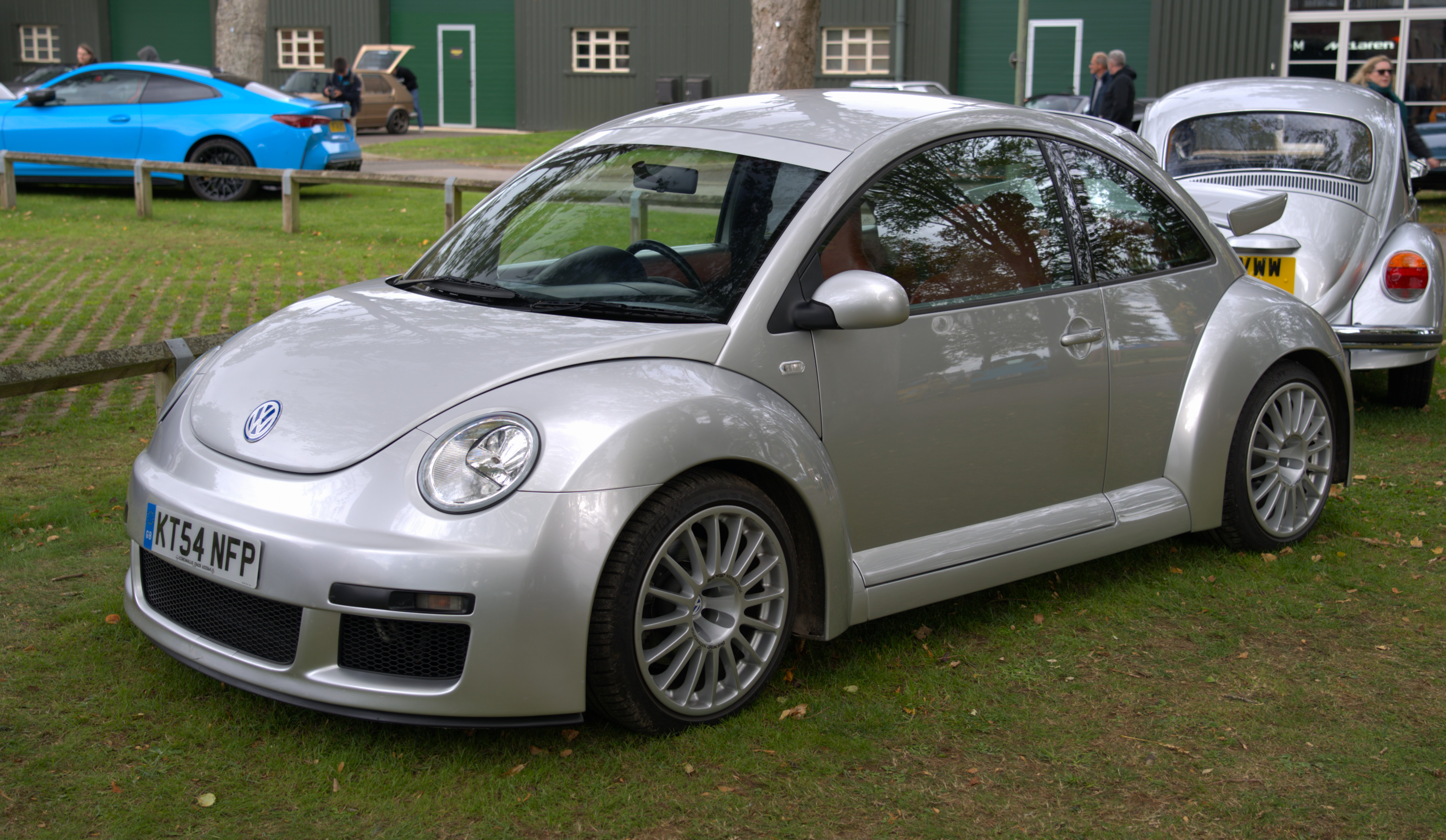
VW New Beetle RSi

The RSi is a limited 250 unit version of the New Beetle. It included a 224 PS (165 kW; 221 hp) 3.2-litre VR6 engine, a 6-speed gearbox, and Volkswagen's four-wheel drive system 4motion, Remus twin-pipe exhaust. It was rumored Porsche tuned the suspension but the suspension tuning was actually carried out in-house at VW Individual. The suspension was greatly altered at the rear, with geometry more geared to the race track and a rear cross brace behind the rear seats, 80 mm (3.1 in) wider fenders, unique front and rear bumpers, a rear diffuser, large rear wing, and 18x9 OZ Superturismo wheels with 235/40ZR-18 tires. Inside, it was trimmed in carbon fiber, billet aluminum, and bright orange leather. The front seats were Recaro racing buckets.

=== Ragster concept (2005) ===
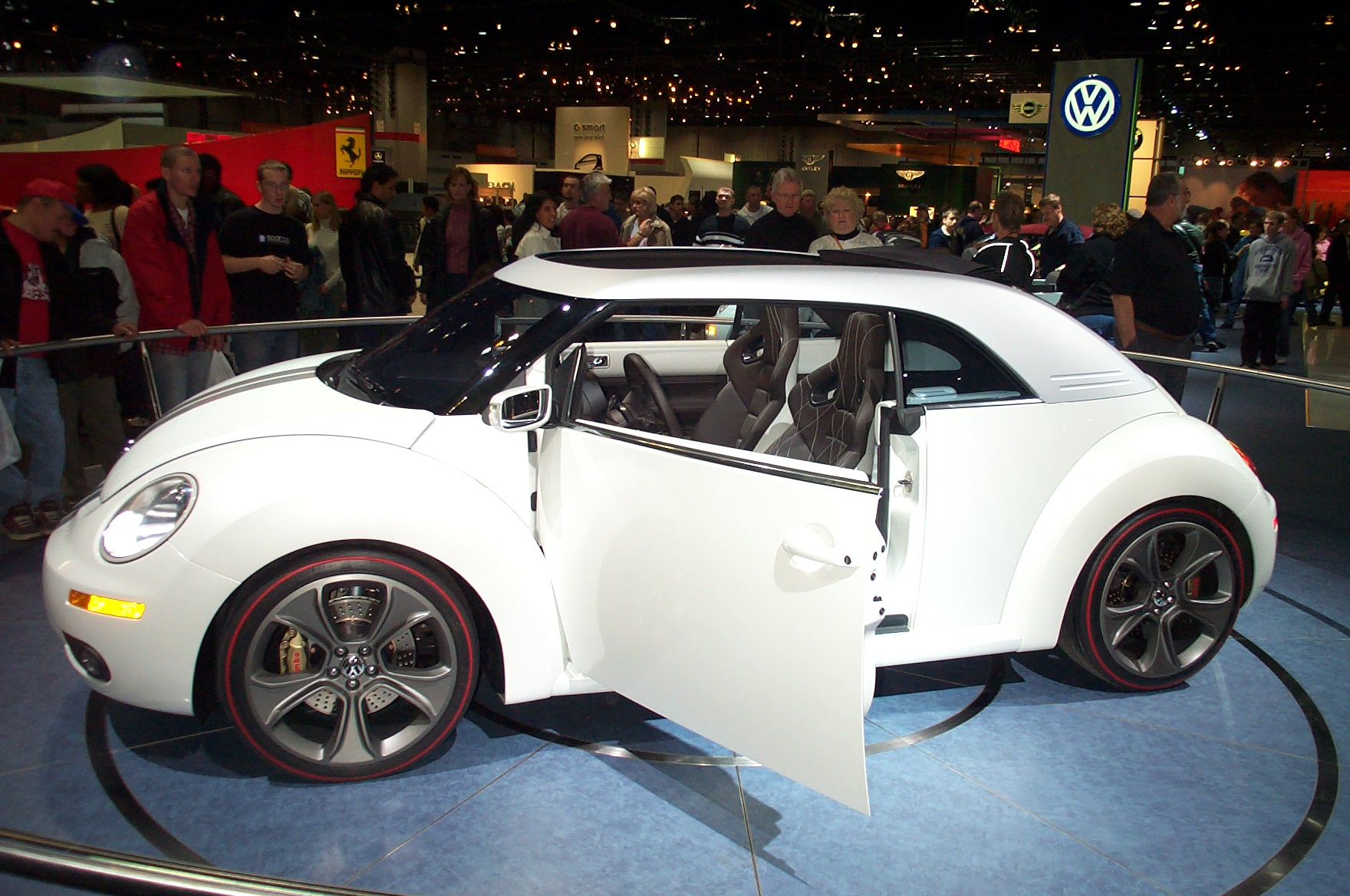
The VW New Beetle Ragster Concept at the 2005 Chicago Auto Show

At the 2005 North American International Auto Show, the Volkswagen New Beetle Ragster concept car was introduced. It was supposed to be a preview of the future design of the New Beetle. The base of the Ragster (the name denoting a cross between a "ragtop" and a speedster) was a New Beetle Convertible modified with a new roof, giving it a much lower roofline, and a unique paint job with silver double stripes. The interior differs from the original New Beetle, being a 2+2, and having distinctive control dials. The Ragster's rear-view mirror is mounted on its dashboard, a retro feature, reminiscent of the first Type 1s.

=== Anniversary Edition (2008) ===
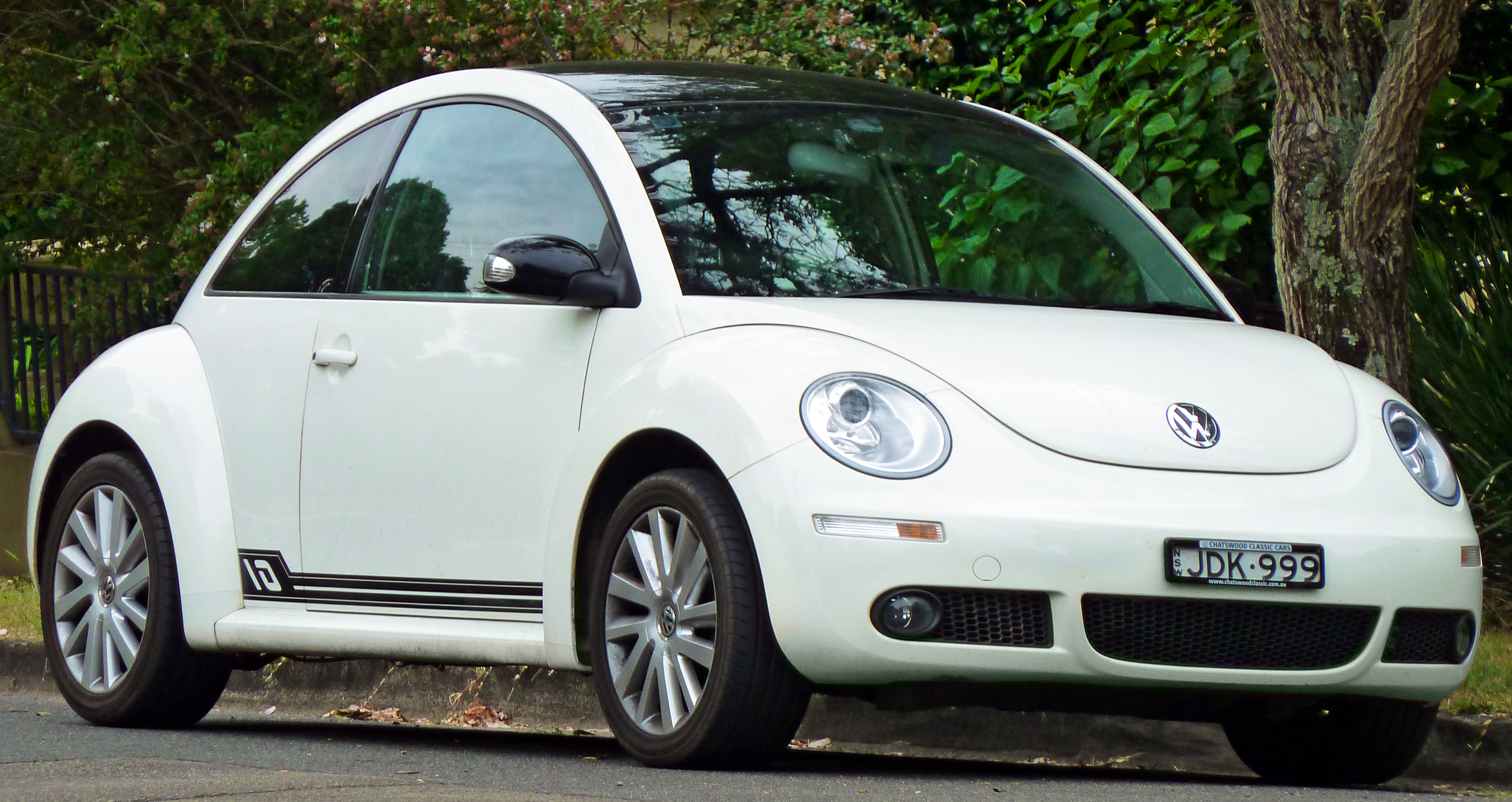
VW New Beetle 10th Anniversary Edition

The anniversary edition was released in 2008 for the Mexican and Australian markets, and celebrated the 10th anniversary of the New Beetle. Based on the Beetle Miami, the car featured the exclusive body colour of "Campanella white", with a black roof and door mirrors, and featured a '10' logo stripe on the side. The interior was also modified, featuring black and white leather seats with a '10' logo on the headrest and in the footwells, with a decoration showing the production number of the Beetle. The car had a 1.6 litre petrol engine. 310 New Beetle Anniversary Editions were produced.

=== Blush (2009) ===
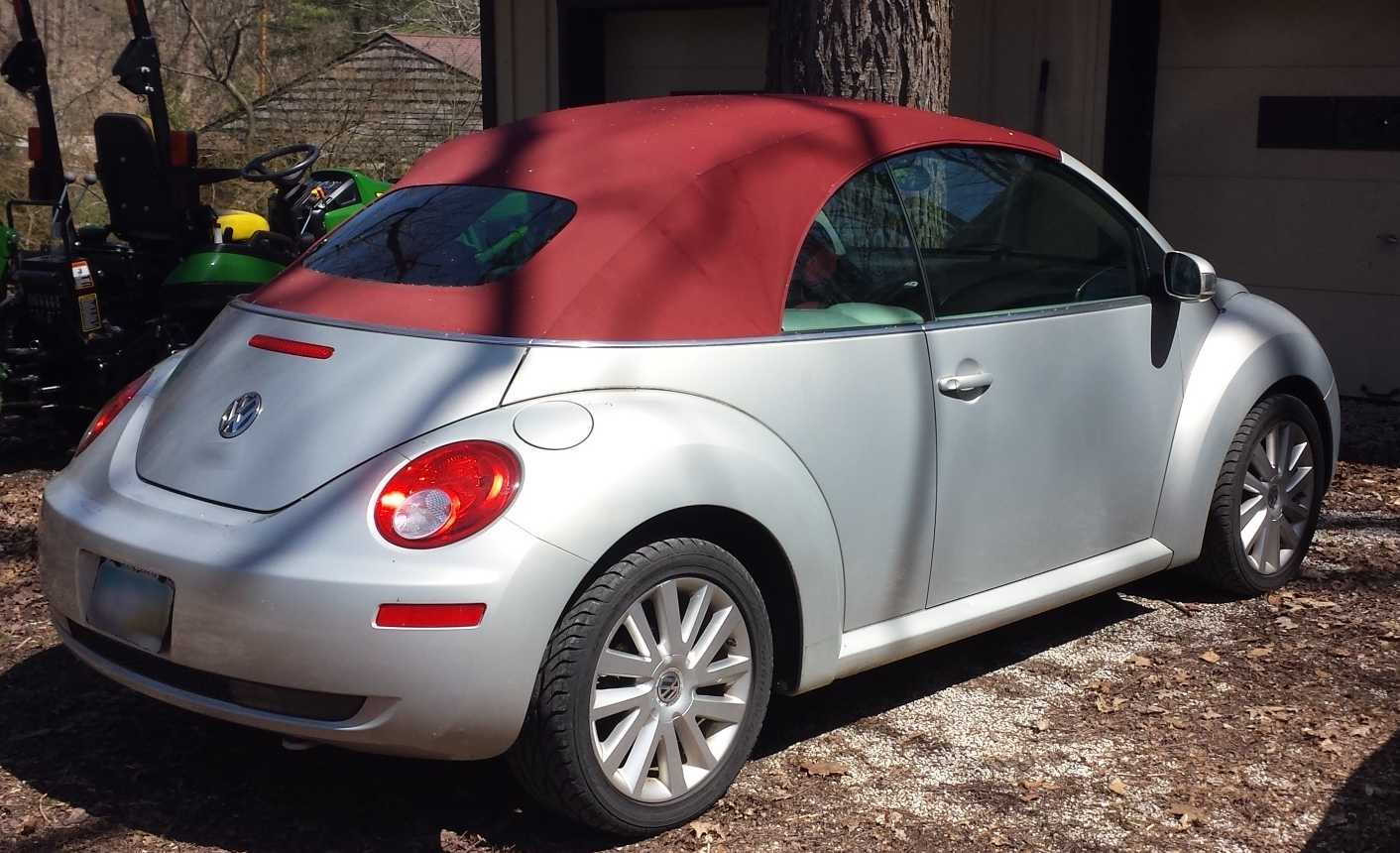
New Beetle Blush Convertible, with its unique exterior paint and interior color combination

The Blush is a limited New Beetle convertible with a special "white gold" exterior paint and "Bordeaux red" convertible top, with burgundy leather seats matching the convertible top color. Neither the white gold exterior nor interior colors were available on other 2009 New Beetle convertibles. 1,500 New Beetle Blush convertibles were produced.

=== Final edition (2010) ===
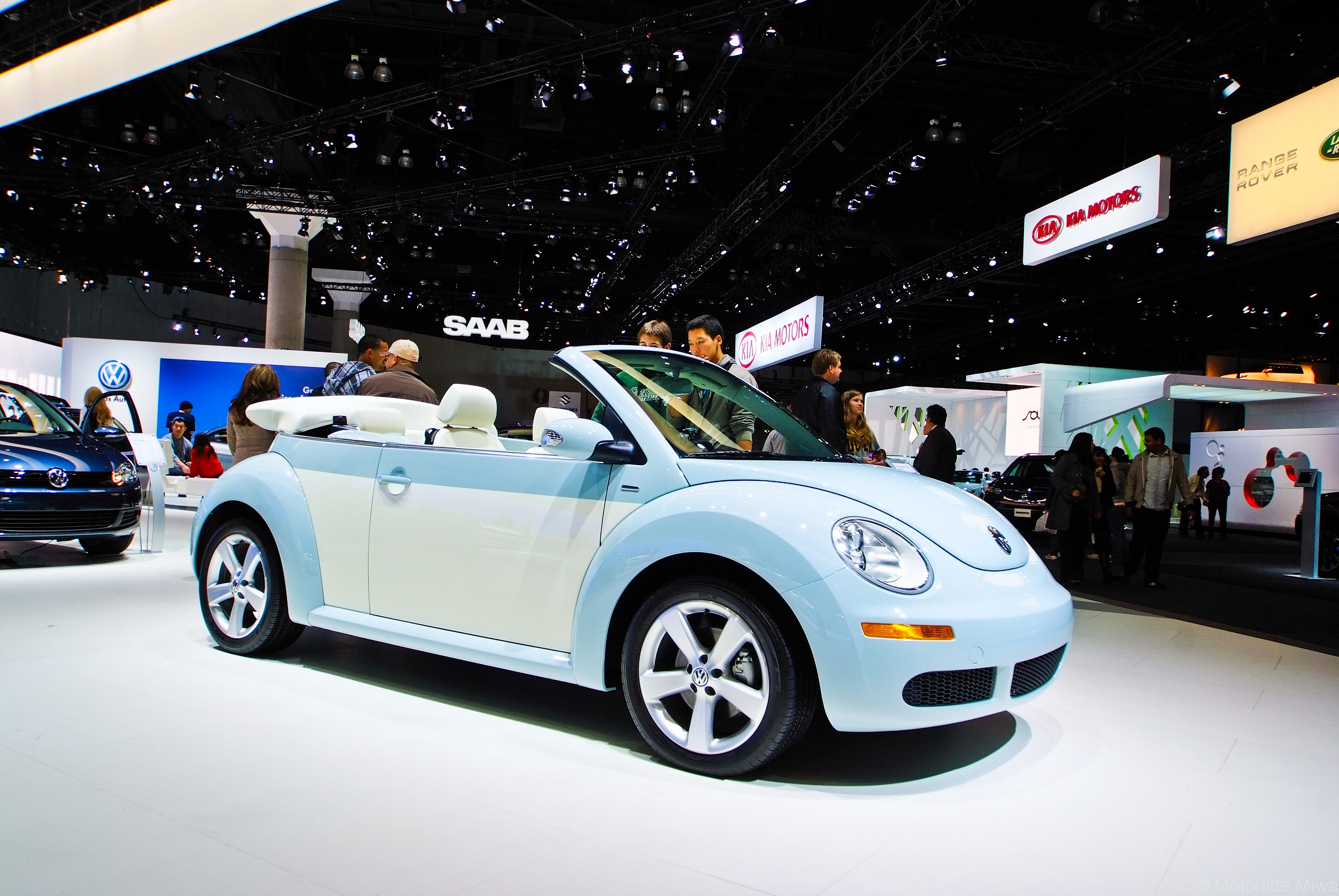
VW New Beetle Final Edition (Cabriolet)

Announced at the 2009 Los Angeles Auto Show, the 2010 Final Edition New Beetle featured Aquarius Blue paintwork, with the hardtop receiving a black painted roof and the convertible sporting Campanella White painted side panels. In addition to unique 17-inch wheels, both models were powered by a 2.5-liter engine mated to an automatic "Tiptronic" transmission. Other additions included sports suspension and "Final Edition" badging inside and out. Both models arrived with integrated fog lights and Electronic Stability Programme (ESP) as standard.

The "Final Edition" marked the end of production of the New Beetle. It was succeeded in 2011 by the Beetle (A5).

=== BlackOrange Edition (2010) ===
In 2010, Volkswagen Australia offered a final limited edition variant named as BlackOrange Edition. Two-color combinations were available: Black gloss exterior with silver mirrors, silver alloy wheels and silver decals for the lower flanks of the body, or Red Rock metallic exterior with black roof/mirrors, black alloy wheels and black decals for the lower flanks. All BlackOrange Editions came with 17-inch alloy wheels, sports suspension, leatherette seat upholstery, cruise control, front fog lights, tinted rear side/rear windows, aluminium pedals and leather-bound steering wheel/gear knob.

== Awards ==
The Volkswagen New Beetle was Motor Trend's "Import Car of the Year" for 1999.

== Sales ==
Year	Production	
Year	Hatchback	Cabriolet
1997	415	-
1998	107,090	-
1999	160,147	-
2000	149,426	-
2001	115,851	-
2002	94,428	7,072
2003	50,318	60,276
2004	38,847	41,271
2005	35,485	30,531
2006	43,653	30,007
2007	40,124	26,752
2008	37,893	17,100
2009	24,328	12,773
2010	31,533	8,640
2011	21,496	
Total	1,185,456	

== See also ==
- Punch buggy
- Hot hatch
- Beetle Adventure Racing
