= Chery Fulwin =

Chery Fulwin or Chery Fengyun (Chinese: 奇瑞风云; pinyin: Qíruì Fēngyún) may refer to:

- Chery Fengyun, sometimes written in the romanized form as "Chery Fulwin", a car produced in 1999–2003
- Chery Fulwin 2, also written in the Chinese-pinyin form as "Chery Fengyun 2", a car produced in 2009–2019
- Fulwin, sub-brand of Chery established in 2023 to market plug-in hybrid vehicles
