= Tritec engine =

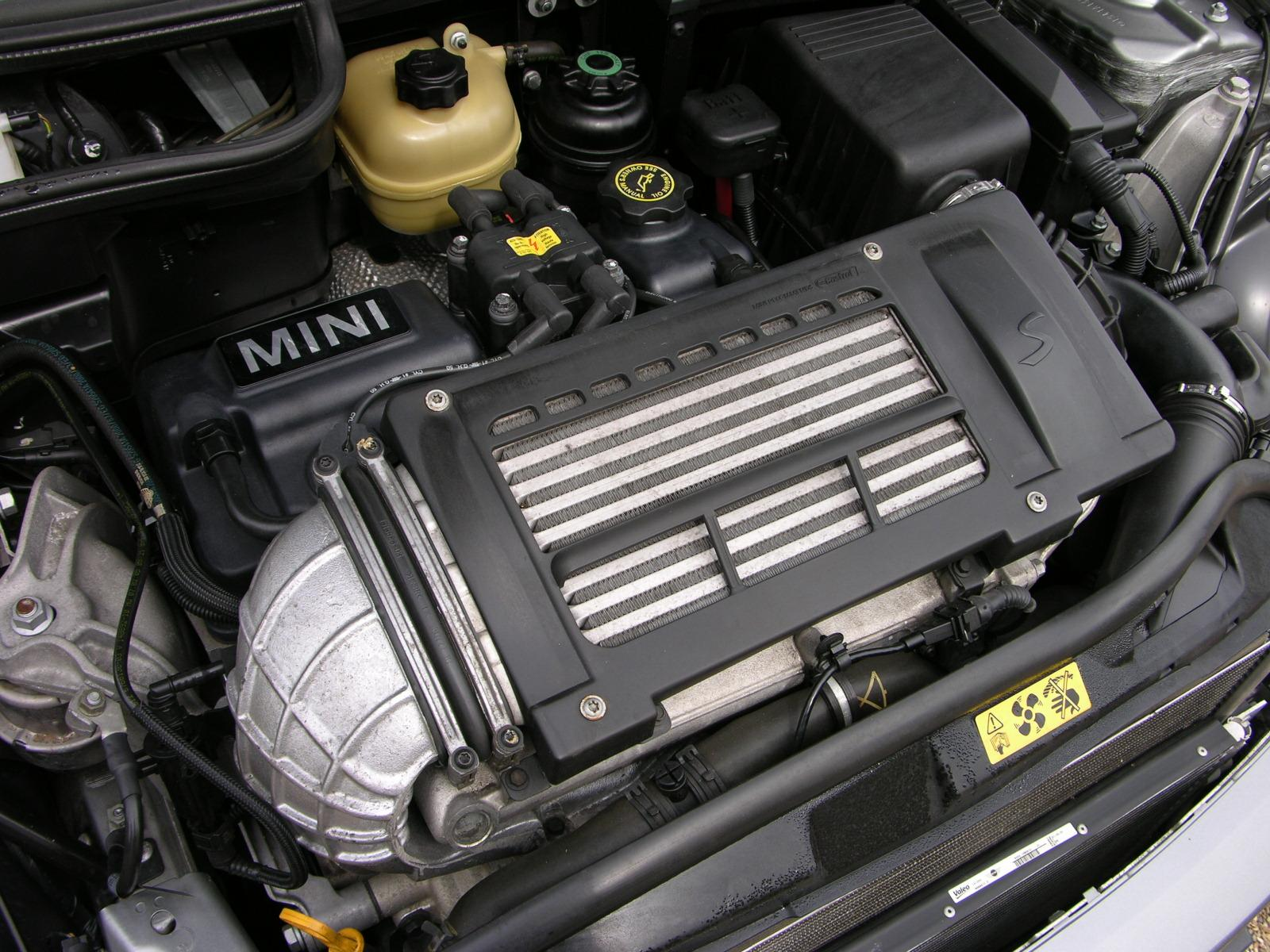
- MINI Cooper S convertible engine bay

Overview
- Manufacturer: Tritec Motors
- Production: 1999–2007

Layout
- Configuration: Straight-4
- Displacement: 1.4 L (1,397 cc); 1.6 L (1,598 cc)
- Cylinder bore: 77 mm (3.03 in)
- Piston stroke: 75 mm (2.95 in); 85.8 mm (3.38 in)
- Cylinder block material: Cast iron
- Cylinder head material: Aluminum alloy
- Valvetrain: SOHC 4 valves x cyl.
- Compression ratio: 8.3:1, 10.5:1

Combustion
- Supercharger: Eaton M45 Roots type with intercooler (in some versions)
- Fuel system: MPSEFI
- Fuel type: Gasoline
- Cooling system: Water-cooled

Output
- Power output: 55–160 kW (75–218 PS; 74–215 hp)
- Torque output: 122–250 N⋅m (90–184 lb⋅ft)

Chronology
- Successor: Fiat E.torQ engine Prince engine

The Tritec engine (also known as Pentagon) is a four-cylinder petrol engine that was manufactured between 1999 and 2007 by Tritec Motors in Brazil and was used in various cars including Chrysler and Mini models.

== Tritec Motors Ltda ==
In 1997, Chrysler Corporation and Rover Group (then a subsidiary of BMW) formed a joint venture called Tritec Motors to design a new small straight-4 engine. The new company built a factory in Campo Largo of Curitiba, Brazil specifically to manufacture the new engine. The Tritec name stands for the union of the three countries involved: Germany, the United Kingdom, and Brazil.

When BMW broke up the remains of Rover Group in 2000, BMW kept the stake in Tritec Motors because the engine was in use in the Mini range which BMW had retained. In 2007 BMW sold its 50% stake to DaimlerChrysler and cancelled its contract for the Tritec engine. BMW entered into a new joint venture with PSA Peugeot Citroen to develop the Prince engine which is used in the second generation Mini cars.

The factory had a capacity of 400,000 engines a year, and in 2006 production was around 200,000 engines. Production ceased in June 2007 following the ending of the joint venture.

In March 2008 Fiat Powertrain Technologies bought the plant and licenses to produce Tritec engines at a cost of €83 million, and in 2010 subsequently launched its own E.torQ engine.

== Engine details ==
It is a modern engine with an SOHC 16-valve head, electronic throttle control, and meets Euro IV emissions requirements. There are three versions of the engine, 1.4 L (1,397 cc), 1.6 L (1,598 cc) and supercharged 1.6 L (1,598 cc).

BMW complained about the performance of the engine. According to Ward's Auto, Erich Sonntag of BMW described the Tritec engine as old fashioned and not very effective on function, performance and fuel efficiency. This was no news to the Rover Group engineers on the MINI project, who had wanted to use Rover's K-Series engine, an older design which had similar power output and fuel efficiency, but was built next door to the proposed MINI line at Longbridge, and already had amortised its R&D.

=== 1.4 (T14a) ===
The 1.4 L (1,397 cc) version uses a bore and stroke of 77 mm × 75 mm (3.03 in × 2.95 in). Like all Tritecs, it is an SOHC 16-valve cast iron engine with an aluminium cylinder head and multipoint sequential electronic fuel injection. Output is rated at 55 kW (75 PS; 74 hp) and 122 N⋅m (90 lb⋅ft).

Applications:

- Mini One (Portugal, Greece) (until 2008)

=== 1.6 (T16b3) ===
The 1.6 L (1,598 cc) version uses the same 77 mm (3.03 in) bore with a longer 85.8 mm (3.38 in) stroke. Output is rated at 66 kW (90 PS; 89 hp) and 140 N⋅m (103 lb⋅ft) in the Mini One, and 85 kW (116 PS; 114 hp) and 149 N⋅m (110 lb⋅ft) in the Mini Cooper and Chrysler PT Cruiser.

One of the 1.6-liter engines, the EJD, is used in the Chrysler Pronto Cruizer, Chrysler PT Cruiser, and the Chrysler Neon.

Applications:

- Chery A11 (Windcloud)
- Chery A15 (Flagcloud)
- Chrysler Neon (in non-US markets)
- Chrysler PT Cruiser (in non-US markets)
- Lifan 620
- Lifan 520
- Mini Hatch and Convertible (until 2008).

=== 1.6 SC (T16b4) ===
The 1.6 SC uses an Eaton M45 Roots type supercharger with intercooler. The compression ratio is reduced from 10.5:1 to 8.3:1. Output was initially rated at 120 kW (160 PS; 160 hp) and 210 N⋅m (150 lb⋅ft) of torque and increased to 125 kW (170 PS; 168 hp) and 220 N⋅m (160 lb⋅ft). The 1.6 L (1,598 cc) SC won the "1.4 L to 1.8 L" category at the International Engine of the Year awards for 2003. It also won Ward's 10 Best Engines award for 2003.

The 2006 Mini John Cooper Works GP Kit was upgraded to 160 kW (218 PS; 215 bhp) at 7,100 rpm and 250 N⋅m (184 lb⋅ft) of torque at 4,600 rpm.

Applications:

- Mini Hatch Cooper S
- 2006 Dodge Hornet concept car
