= SEAT Toledo =

Small family car produced by the Spanish manufacturer SEAT

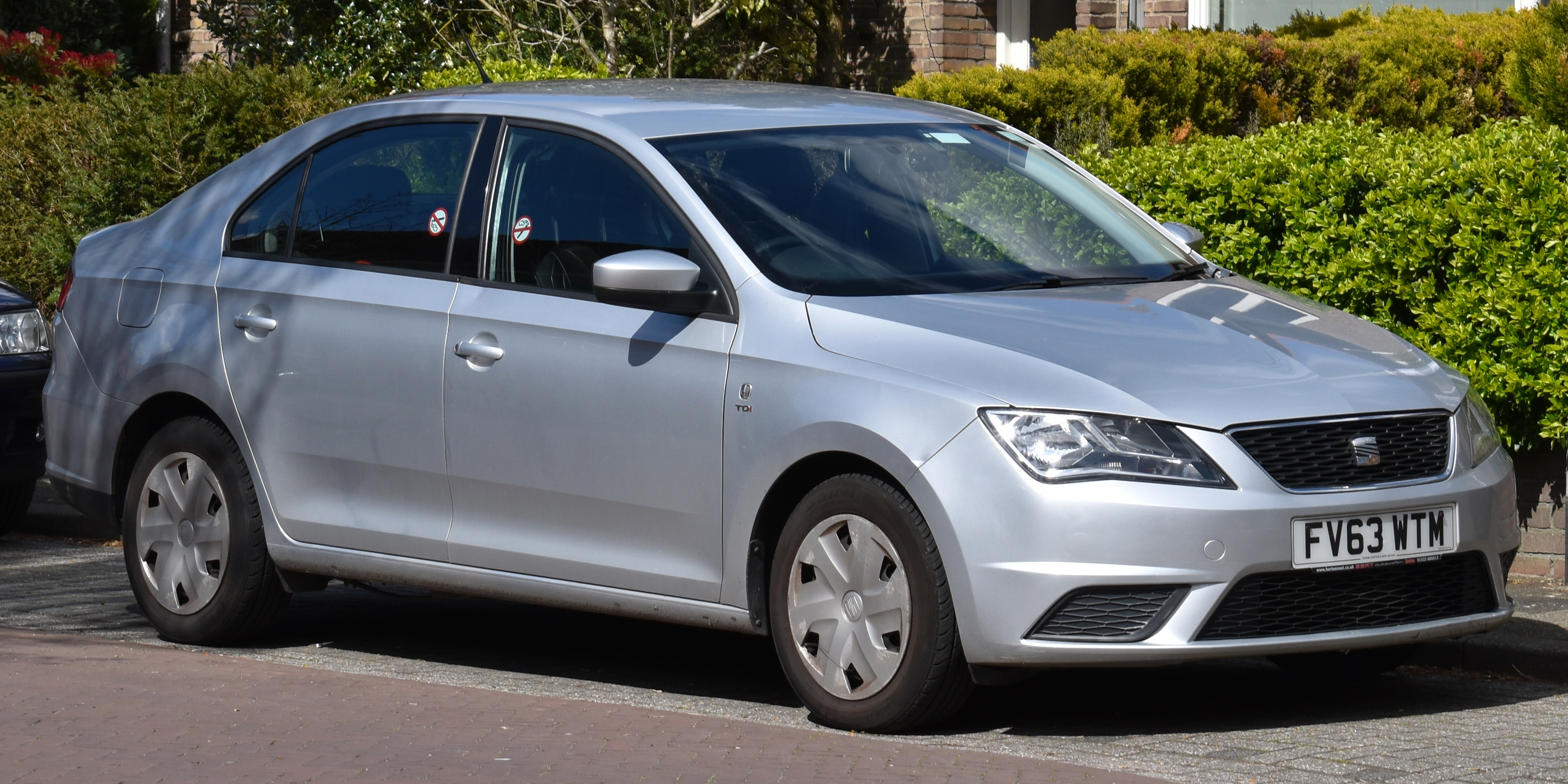

Overview
- Manufacturer: SEAT (1991–2009); Škoda Auto (2012–2019)
- Production: May 1991 – May 2009; 2012–February 2019

Body and chassis
- Class: Small family car (C)
- Layout: Front-engine, front-wheel-drive

Chronology
- Predecessor: SEAT Málaga
- Successor: SEAT León Mk4

The SEAT Toledo is a small family car produced by the Spanish manufacturer SEAT, part of Volkswagen Group. The Toledo name was first introduced to the SEAT line up in May 1991 being named after a Spanish city with the same name, with the fourth generation being introduced at the end of 2012, for the model year of 2013. Production ended in February 2019, and the nameplate is currently not in use.

== First generation (Typ 1L; 1991) ==
Mk1 (1L)
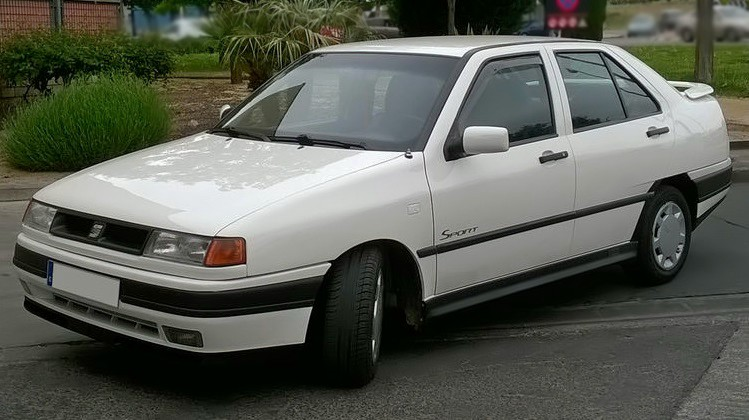

Overview
- Production: May 1991 – June 1999
- Assembly: Spain: Martorell, Catalonia
- Designer: Giorgetto Giugiaro at Italdesign

Body and chassis
- Body style: 5-door liftback
- Platform: Volkswagen Group A2
- Related: Chery A11; Chery A15; Volkswagen Golf Mk2

Powertrain
- Engine: petrol: 1.6 L I4; 1.8 L I4; 1.8 L 16v I4; 2.0 L I4; 2.0 L 16v I4; diesel: 1.9 L I4; 1.9 L TDI I4

Dimensions
- Wheelbase: 2,470 mm (97.2 in)
- Length: 4,320 mm (170.1 in)
- Width: 1,660 mm (65.4 in)
- Height: 1,425 mm (56.1 in)
- Kerb weight: 985 kg (2,172 lb)−1,110 kg (2,447 lb)

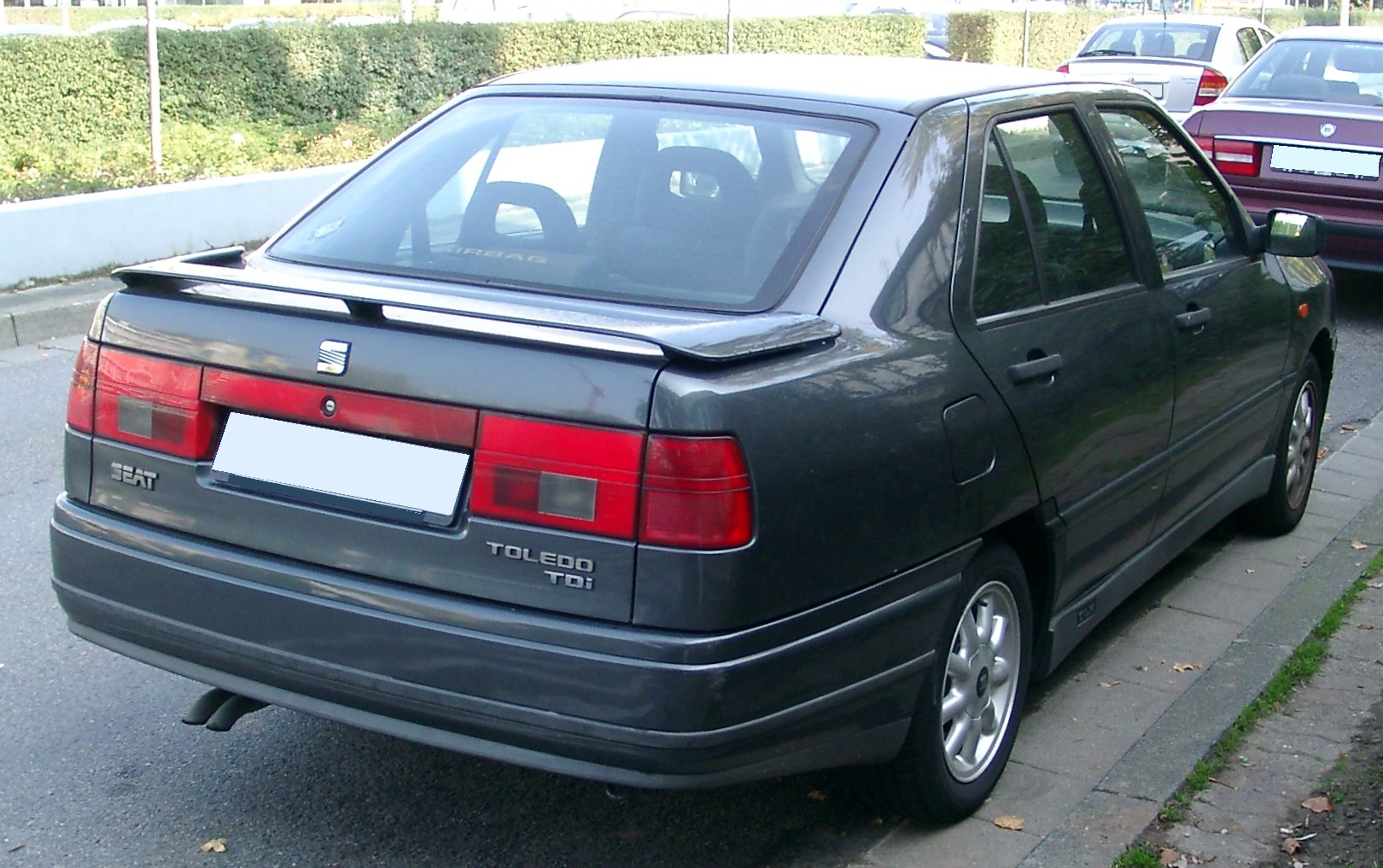
SEAT Toledo Mk1 (pre facelift)

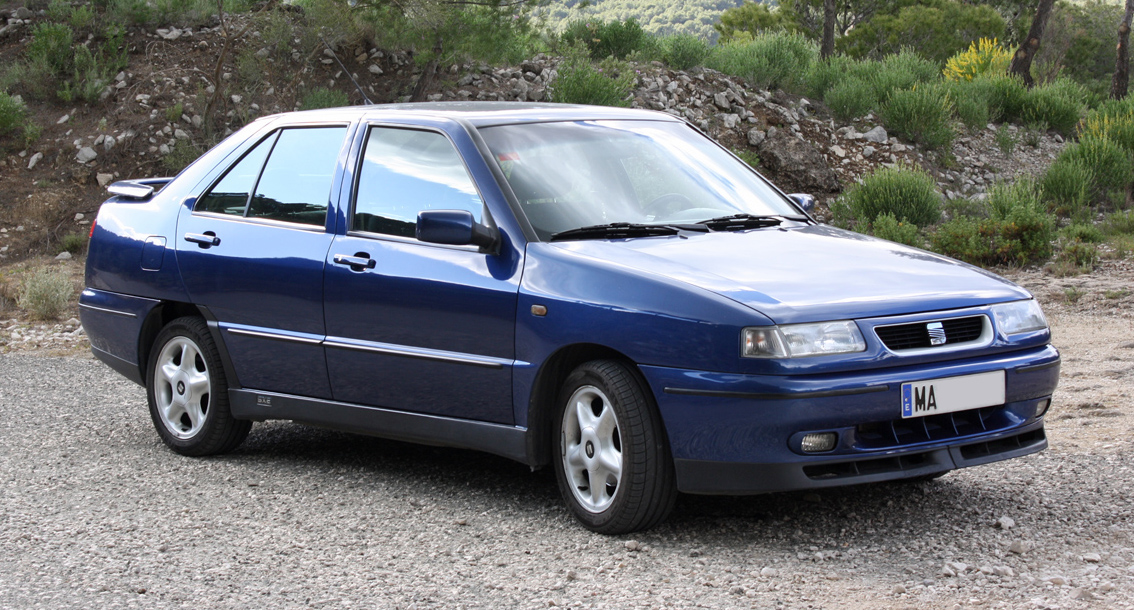
SEAT Toledo Mk1 (facelift)

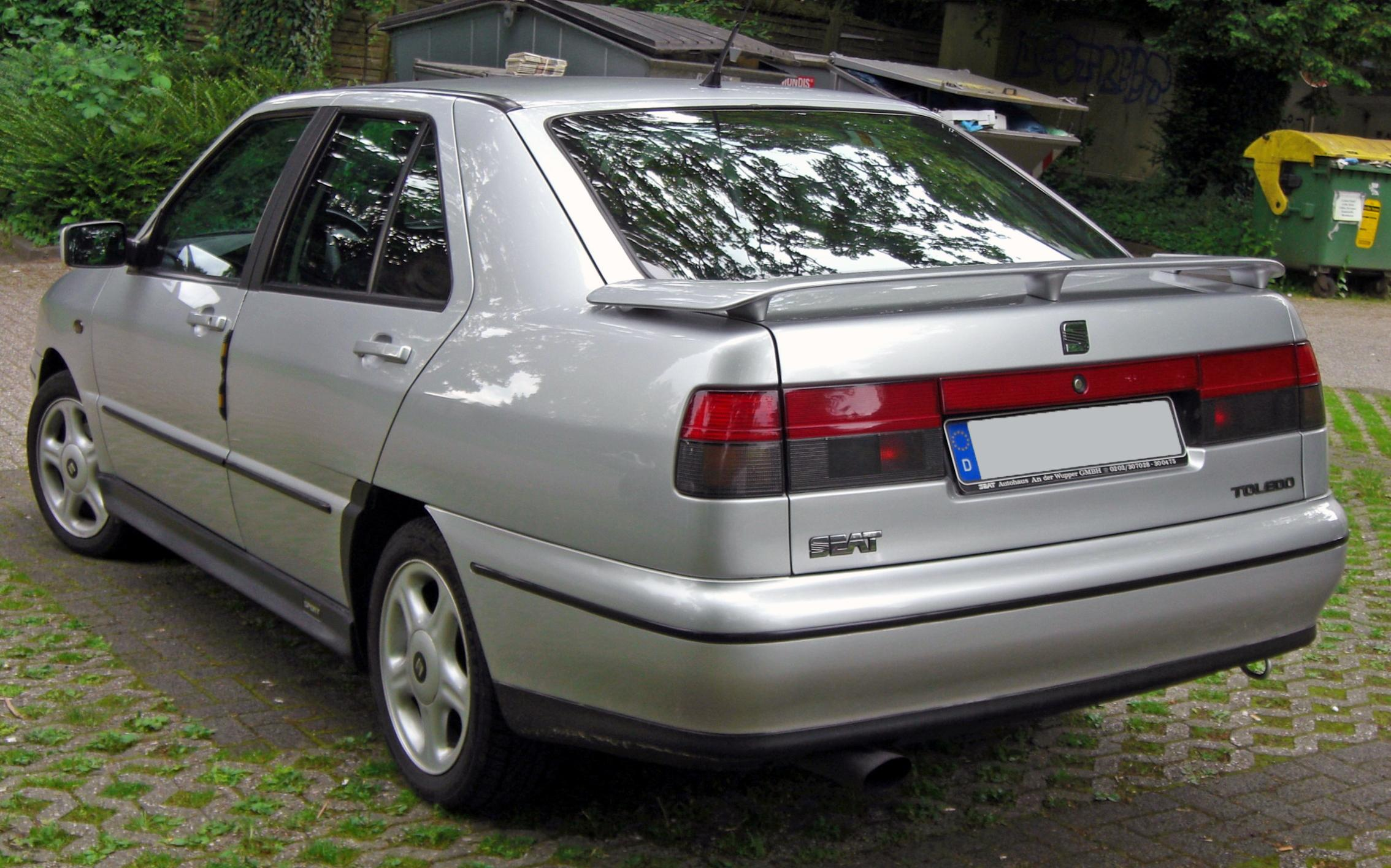
SEAT Toledo Mk1 (facelift)

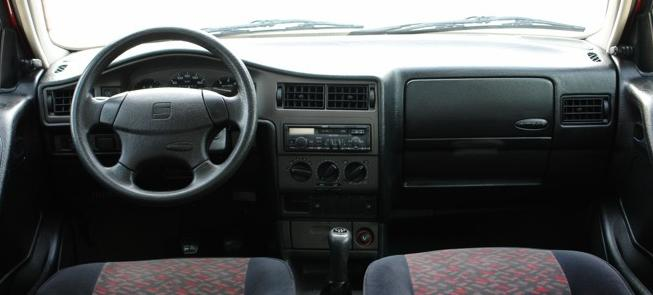
Interior

The initial version of the SEAT Toledo (Typ 1L) was launched as a four-door fastback saloon, and its sales career lasted from May 1991 to March 1999. Technically it was a five-door liftback, as its boot lid opened together with the rear window.

This generation of the Toledo was the first SEAT automobile developed entirely under Volkswagen Group ownership, and it was built on the Golf Mk2 Volkswagen Group A2 platform with a 550-litre boot expandable to 1360 litres when folding rear seats, larger in shape and size than the Volkswagen Jetta/Vento's combined with the advantage of a tailgate.

As saloon versions of small family cars were rare in Europe, it was sometimes considered a large family car due to its overall length and boot size, despite having comparably less rear leg room, and pricing closer to small family cars.

It went on sale in most of Europe in May 1991, though it did not arrive on the British market until October 1991, with the official launch at the London Motorfair. The Toledo was the first SEAT to be sold in Sweden, when it went on sale there at the turn of the year.

The Toledo initially featured the then standard range of Volkswagen Group engines for the class, from a base 1.6 L 75 PS (55 kW; 74 bhp) petrol engine up to one GT version using the 2.0 L 115 PS (85 kW; 113 bhp) engine.

Later, the Toledo would see the addition of more powerful versions, including a 150 PS (110 kW; 148 bhp) 2.0 GTI 16v, and 110 PS (81 kW; 108 bhp) 1.9 TDI which, like many diesel engines built since 1996 by the Volkswagen Group, is advertised as capable of running on either mineral diesel or biodiesel.

This model later received a mild facelift in September 1995, and made its début at the 1995 Frankfurt Motor Show. Sales were not strong however, as has been the case for all the generations of the Toledo.

=== Engine specifications ===
The following engines were available:

Model designation	Engine code	Displacement	Engine configuration	Fuel system	Max. power at rpm (Directive 80/1269/EEC)	Max. torque at rpm	0–100 km/h (62 mph)	Top speed (saloon)	Years
Petrol engines
1.6	EZ, ABN	1,595 cc (97.3 cu in)	I4; SOHC 8v	Carburettor	55 kW (75 PS; 74 hp) at 5,200	132 N⋅m (97 lb⋅ft) at 2,600	13.2 sec	170 km/h (106 mph)	May 1991–Jul 1994
1.6	1F	1,595 cc (97.3 cu in)	I4; SOHC 8v	Single-point injection	52 kW (71 PS; 70 hp) at 5,200 rpm	124 N⋅m (91 lb⋅ft) at 2,750 rpm	13.3 sec	170 km/h (106 mph)	May 1991–Jul 1994
1.6	1F	1,595 cc (97.3 cu in)	I4; SOHC 8v	Single-point injection	55 kW (75 PS; 74 hp) at 5,500 rpm	125 N⋅m (92 lb⋅ft) at 2,600 rpm	13.3 sec	170 km/h (106 mph)	Aug 1994–Mar 1999
1.6	AFT	1,595 cc (97.3 cu in)	I4; SOHC 8v	Multiport fuel injection	74 kW (101 PS; 99 hp) at 5,800 rpm	140 N⋅m (103 lb⋅ft) at 3,500 rpm	11.3 sec	188 km/h (117 mph)	Sep 1996–Mar 1999
1.8	RP	1,781 cc (108.7 cu in)	I4; SOHC 8v	Single-point injection	65 kW (88 PS; 87 hp) at 5,500 rpm	140 N⋅m (103 lb⋅ft) at 3,000 rpm	12.0 sec	182 km/h (113 mph)	May 1991–Nov 1993
1.8	ABS, ADZ	1,781 cc (108.7 cu in)	I4; SOHC 8v	Single-point injection	66 kW (90 PS; 89 hp) at 5,500 rpm	145 N⋅m (107 lb⋅ft) at 2,700–2,900 rpm	12.0 sec	182 km/h (113 mph)	Nov 1993–Mar 1999
1.8	PL	1,781 cc (108.7 cu in)	I4 DOHC 16v	Multiport fuel injection	94 kW (128 PS; 126 hp) at 6,000 rpm	160 N⋅m (118 lb⋅ft) at 4,500 rpm	9.4 sec	202 km/h (126 mph)	May 1991–Mar 1994
1.8	KR	1,781 cc (108.7 cu in)	I4 DOHC 16v	Multiport fuel injection	98 kW (133 PS; 131 hp) at 6,100 rpm	160 N⋅m (118 lb⋅ft) at 4,500–5,500 rpm	9.4 sec	202 km/h (126 mph)	May 1991–Nov 1992
2.0	2E	1,984 cc (121.1 cu in)	I4 SOHC 8v	Multiport fuel injection	85 kW (115 PS; 113 hp) at 5,400 rpm	166 N⋅m (122 lb⋅ft) at 3,200 rpm	10.5 sec	196 km/h (122 mph)	May 1991–Jul 1996
2.0	AGG	1,984 cc (121.1 cu in)	I4 SOHC 8v	Multiport fuel injection	85 kW (115 PS; 113 hp) at 5,400 rpm	166 N⋅m (122 lb⋅ft) at 2,600 rpm	10.5 sec	196 km/h (122 mph)	Mar 1996–Mar 1999
2.0	ABF	1,984 cc (121.1 cu in)	I4 DOHC 16v	Multiport fuel injection	110 kW (150 PS; 148 hp) at 6,000 rpm	180 N⋅m (133 lb⋅ft) at 4,800 rpm	8.4 sec	212 km/h (132 mph)	Mar 1994–Mar 1999
Diesel engines
1.9 D	1Y	1,896 cc (115.7 cu in)	I4 SOHC 8v	Indirect injection	50 kW (68 PS; 67 hp) at 4,400 rpm	127 N⋅m (94 lb⋅ft) at 2,200–2,600 rpm	16.5 sec	165 km/h (103 mph)	May 1991–Jul 1994
1.9 D	1Y	1,896 cc (115.7 cu in)	I4 SOHC 8v	Indirect injection	47 kW (64 PS; 63 hp) at 4,400 rpm	124 N⋅m (91 lb⋅ft) at 2,000–3,000 rpm	17.9 sec	158 km/h (98 mph)	Aug 1994–Mar 1999
1.9 SDI	AEY	1,896 cc (115.7 cu in)	I4 SOHC 8v	Suction Diesel Injection	47 kW (64 PS; 63 hp) at 4,200 rpm	125 N⋅m (92 lb⋅ft) at 2,200–2,800 rpm	17.9 sec	158 km/h (98 mph)	Apr 1995–Mar 1999
1.9 TD	AAZ	1,896 cc (115.7 cu in)	I4 SOHC 8v	Indirect injection	55 kW (75 PS; 74 hp) at 4,200 rpm	150 N⋅m (111 lb⋅ft) at 2,400–3,400 rpm	14.9 sec	171 km/h (106 mph)	May 1991–Apr 1997
1.9 TDI	1Z, AHU	1,896 cc (115.7 cu in)	I4 SOHC 8v	Turbocharged; Direct Injection	66 kW (90 PS; 89 hp) at 4,000 rpm	202 N⋅m (149 lb⋅ft) at 1,900 rpm	13.1 sec	180 km/h (112 mph)	Apr 1995–Mar 1999
1.9 TDI	AFN	1,896 cc (115.7 cu in)	I4 SOHC 8v	Turbocharged; Direct Injection	81 kW (110 PS; 109 hp) at 4,150 rpm	235 N⋅m (173 lb⋅ft) at 1,900 rpm	11.2 sec	193 km/h (120 mph)	Dec 1996–Mar 1999

=== Motorsport ===
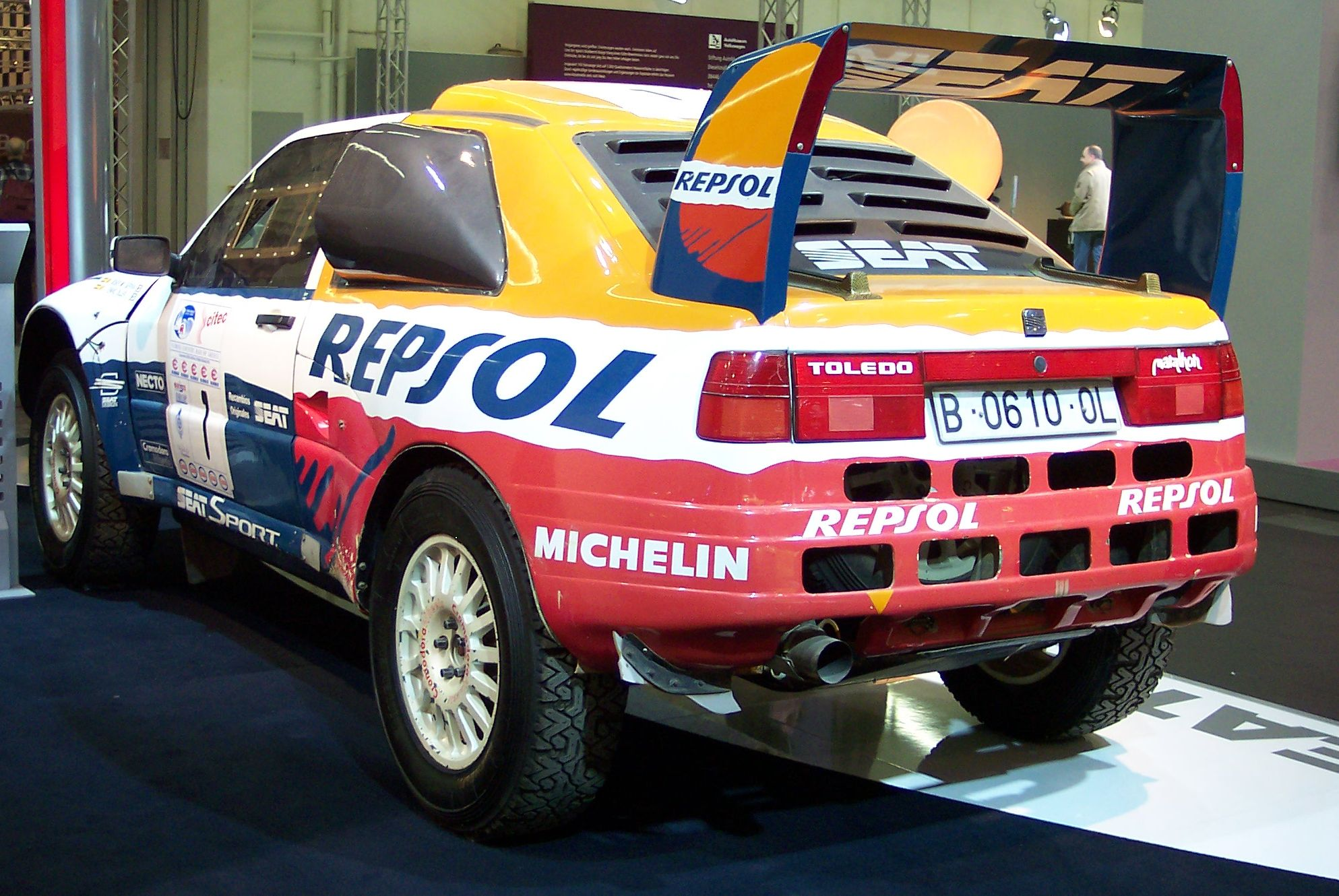
SEAT Toledo Mk1 Marathon

SEAT Toledo Marathon

- (1992 to 1994) (2100 cc 330cv)
- (1997 to 2001) (PVR 3500 cc)

SEAT Toledo Class 2

- (Championship of France superturisme) 1993 to 1994 (195cv)
- (Belgium) 1993 to 1994 (195cv)
- (CET) 1994 (195cv)
- (CET) Meycom 1995 to 1996 (282cv)
- (United Kingdom) 1997 (230cv)

=== Rebadges ===
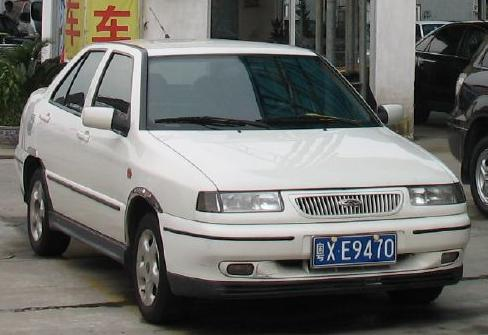
Chery Windcloud, a rebadged SEAT Toledo Mk1

This generation of the Toledo has also been produced by the Chinese manufacturer Chery, and sold under the names of Chery A11, Chery Windcloud (Fulwin) and Chery A15, Chery A168, Chery Amulet, Chery Cowin, Chery Qiyun, Chery Flagcloud. Chery acquired the chassis of the 1993 Toledo from a Mexican dealership, after authorisation from SEAT.

Chery Cowin, which is based on the SEAT Toledo, already has an authorisation to market it in Europe, along with Russia and South America. Apart from the Chery rebadged models, the first generation Toledo is also currently built by the Russian car maker TagAZ, rebranded as the Vortex Corda.

=== Awards ===
- 'Carro do Ano' award in 1992, in Portugal

== Second generation (Typ 1M; 1998) ==
Mk2 (1M)
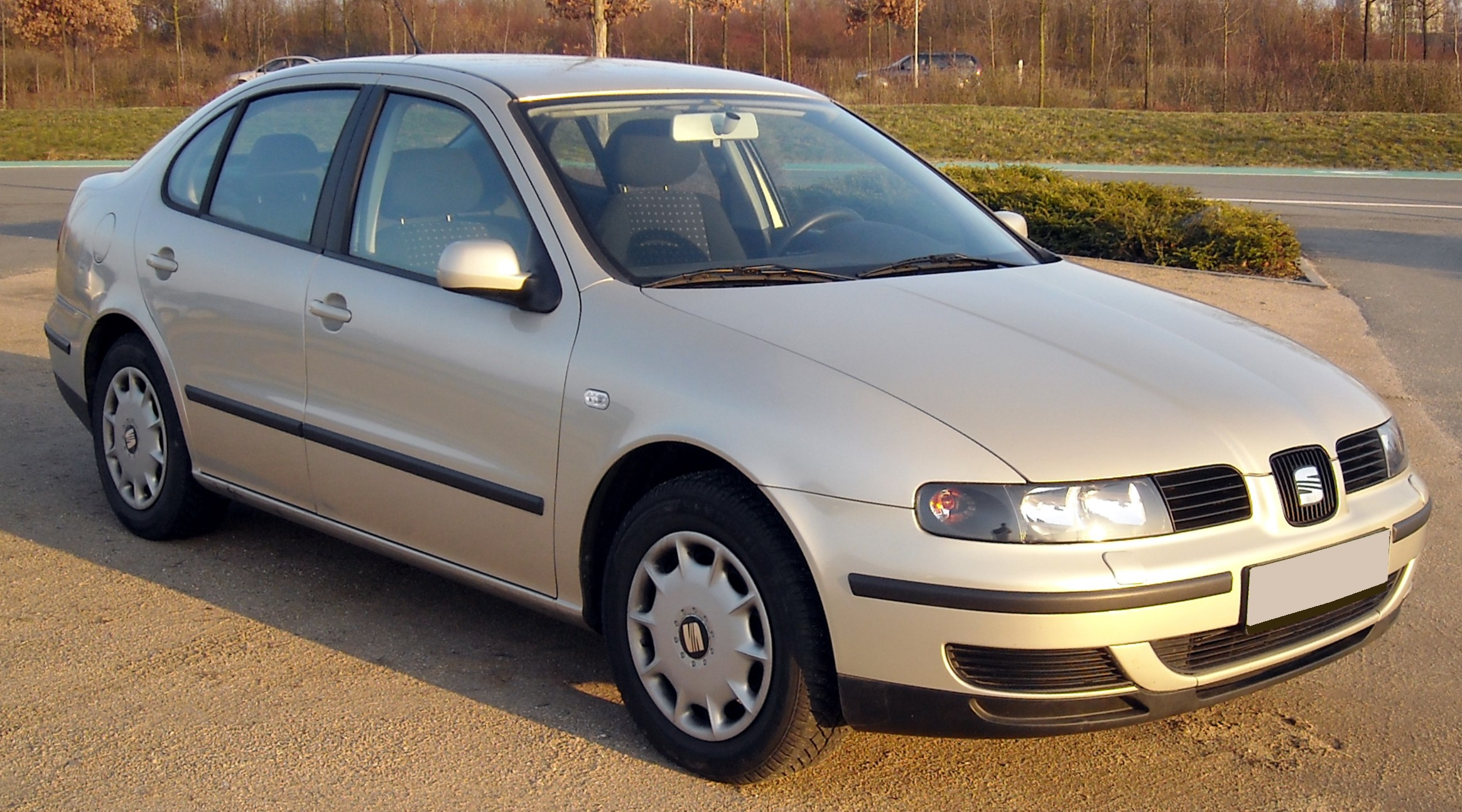

Overview
- Production: October 1998 – July 2004
- Assembly: Spain: Martorell, Catalonia; Belgium: Brussels
- Designer: Giorgetto Giugiaro at Italdesign

Body and chassis
- Body style: 4-door notchback saloon
- Platform: Volkswagen Group A4 (PQ34)
- Related: Audi A3 Mk1; Audi TT Mk1; SEAT León Mk1; Volkswagen Golf Mk4; Volkswagen Bora, Škoda Octavia Mk1

Dimensions
- Wheelbase: 2,513 mm (98.9 in)
- Length: 4,439 mm (174.8 in)
- Width: 1,742 mm (68.6 in)
- Height: 1,440 mm (56.7 in)

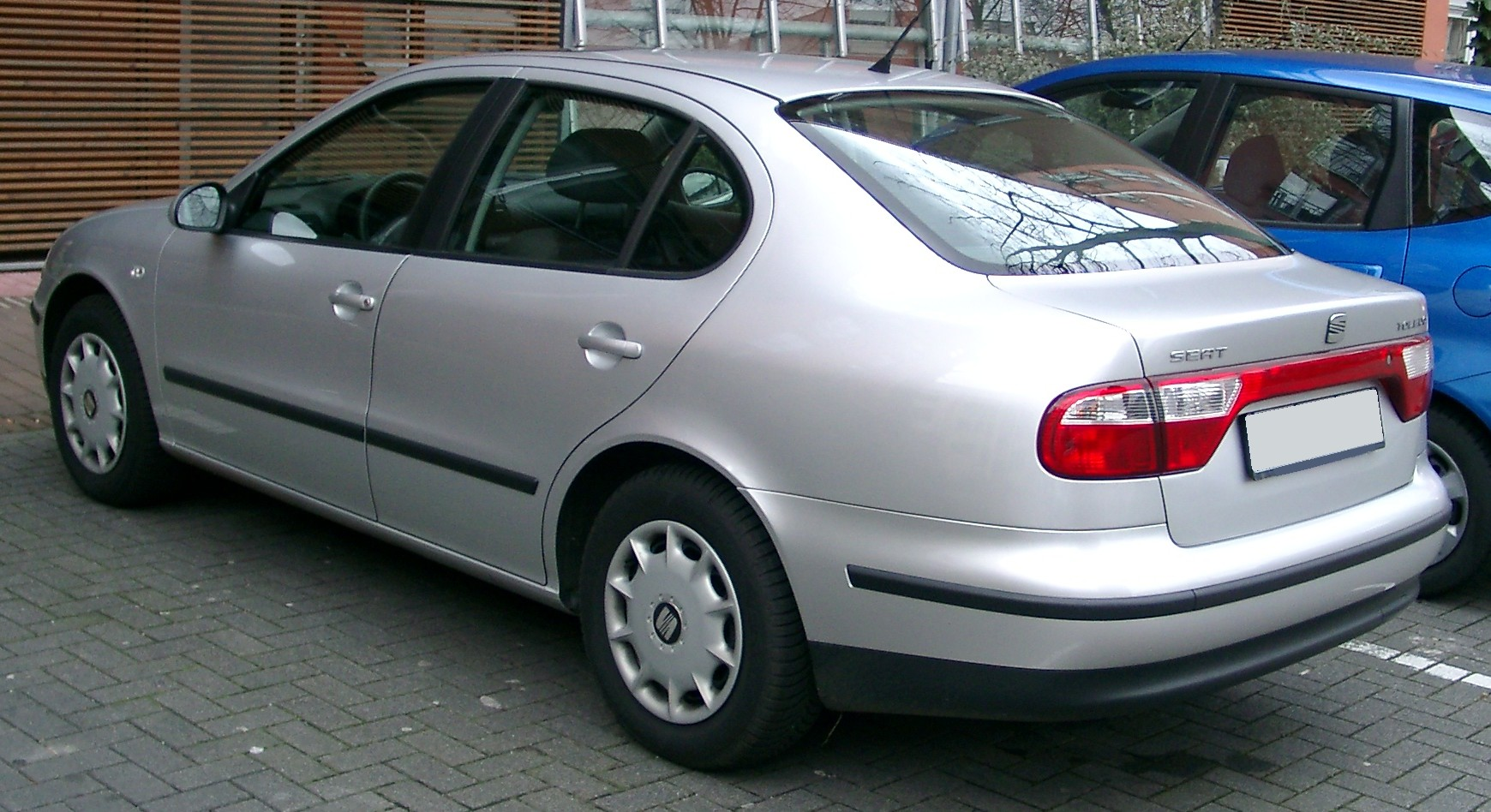
SEAT Toledo

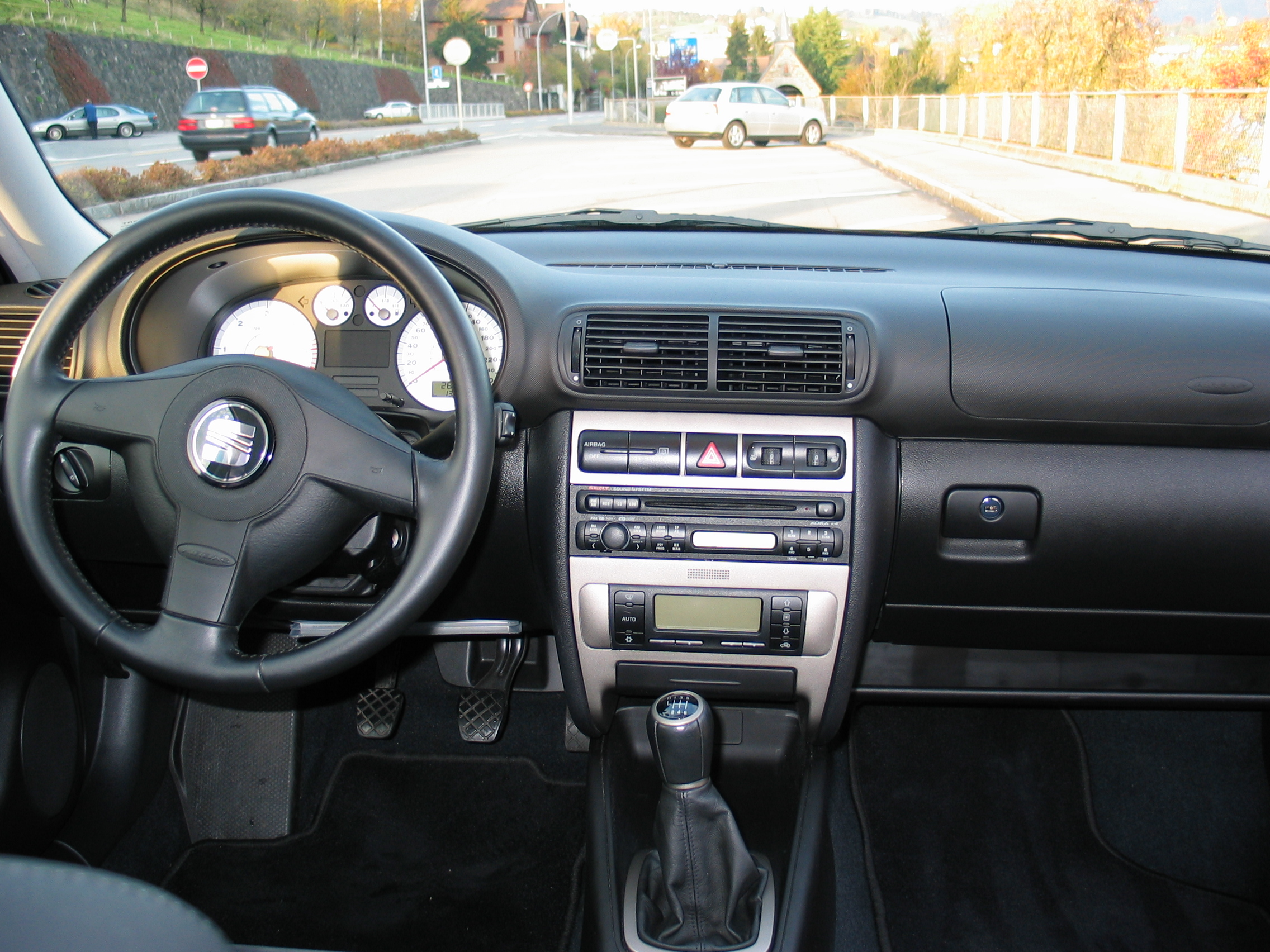
Interior

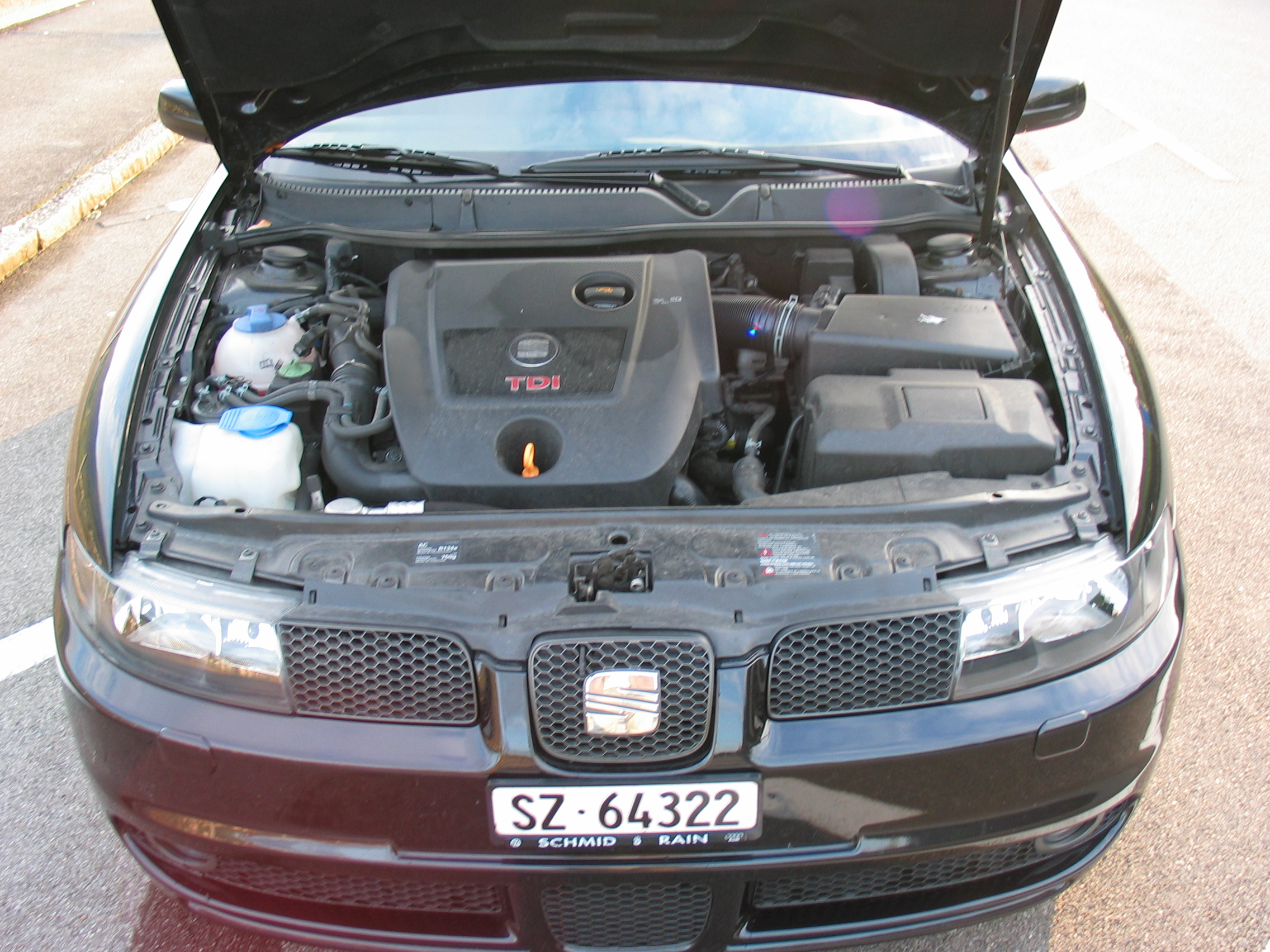
Engine bay

The second generation Toledo (Typ 1M) was introduced in 1998, and made its début at the 1998 Paris Motor Show as a four-door notchback saloon. Sales commenced in October 1998. It went on sale there in March 1999.

It was more rounded than the previous first generation shape and had a much more fluid design, although both were products of Giorgetto Giugiaro's Italdesign studio, with the latest generation being influenced by SEAT's chief of exterior design Steve Lewis.

It shared components with its Volkswagen and Škoda PQ34 platform mates, the Volkswagen Bora and the Škoda Octavia, being positioned as the sportiest of the three. In the interior, the dashboard was derived from that of the first generation Audi A3.

It was built on the Volkswagen Golf Mk4 platform, which meant stiff springs to support the load of the large 500 litre boot increased to 830 litres when folding rear seats.

The early models were built at the Volkswagen/Audi plant in Belgium, with improved build quality (compared to the Spanish built previous generation), although the Toledo was still presented as an economic alternative to the lower level of the D-segment, and included in the basic price a high level of equipment.

One of the features most associated with the Spanish model, the tailgate was removed in favour of a more traditional four door saloon boot opening. The following year, the Toledo would be used as the base for a proper hatchback, the SEAT León Mark 1.

Base model was now a crossflow 1.6 litre 100 PS (74 kW; 99 bhp) petrol engine, followed by a 1.8 litre twenty valve 125 PS (92 kW; 123 bhp) unit, while the top of the line was represented by the 2.3 litre 150 PS (110 kW; 148 bhp) VR5 engine (V5).

Diesel engined versions used the 1.9 Turbocharged Direct Injection (TDI) engine, with a variable geometry turbocharger, offered initially with power outputs of 90 PS (66 kW; 89 bhp) or 110 PS (81 kW; 108 bhp). In 2001, the V5 engine was uprated with a 20v head (four valves per cylinder), boosting power to 170 PS (125 kW; 168 bhp).

Later in the series, the 1.8 litre twenty valve Toledo received a turbocharger, capable of delivering 180 PS (132 kW; 178 bhp), and a later evolution of the VW TDI engine, produced engines of 130 PS (96 kW; 128 bhp) and 150 PS (110 kW; 148 bhp).

These three versions all featured a six speed manual transmission. The 130 PS TDI also featured white dials instead of the standard black dials on the 110 and 150 PS TDI models. Production of the Typ 1M Toledo ended in July 2004.

=== Engine Specifications ===
==== Petrol Engines ====
model	cylinders/ valves	displacement cc	max. power kW (PS) at rpm	max. torque at rpm	engine code	top speed	production period
1.4 16V	R4/16	1,390	55 (75) / 5,000	126 N⋅m (93 lbf⋅ft)/ 3,800	AHW / AXP / AKQ / APE / AUA / BCA	170 km/h (106 mph)	1999–2004
1.6	R4/8	1,595	74 (101) / 5,600	145 N⋅m (107 lbf⋅ft) / 3,800	AKL / AEH / APF	188 km/h (117 mph)	1999–2000
1.6 16V	R4/16	1,598	77 (105) / 5,700	148 N⋅m (109 lbf⋅ft) / 4,500	AUS / AZD / ATN / BCB	192 km/h (119 mph)	2000–2004
1.8 20V	R4/20	1,781	92 (125) / 6,000	170 N⋅m (125 lbf⋅ft) / 4,200	AGN / APG	200 km/h (124 mph)	1999–2003
1.8 20VT	R4/20	1,781	132 (180) / 5,500	235 N⋅m (173 lbf⋅ft) / 1,950–5,000	AUQ	229 km/h (142 mph)	2003–2004
2.3 V5	VR5/10	2,324	110 (150) / 6,000	205 N⋅m (151 lbf⋅ft) / 3,200	AGZ	216 km/h (134 mph)	1999–2000
2.3 V5	VR5/20	2,324	125 (170) / 6,200	225 N⋅m (166 lbf⋅ft) / 3,300	AQN	225 km/h (140 mph)	2000–2003

==== Diesel Engines ====
model	cylinders/ valves	displacement cc	max. power kW (PS) at rpm	max. torque at rpm	engine code	top speed	production period
1.9 TDI	R4/8	1,896	66 (90) / 4,000	210 N⋅m (155 lbf⋅ft) / 1,900	AGR / ALH	180 km/h (112 mph)	1999–2003
1.9 TDI	R4/8	1,896	81 (110) / 4,150	235 N⋅m (173 lbf⋅ft) / 1,900	AHF / ASV	193 km/h (120 mph)	1999–2004
1.9 TDI PD	R4/8	1,896	96 (130) / 4,000	310 N⋅m (229 lbf⋅ft) / 1,900	ASZ	205 km/h (127 mph)	2003–2004
1.9 TDI PD	R4/8	1,896	110 (150) / 4,000	320 N⋅m (236 lbf⋅ft) / 1,900	ARL	215 km/h (134 mph)	2000–2004

=== Motorsport ===
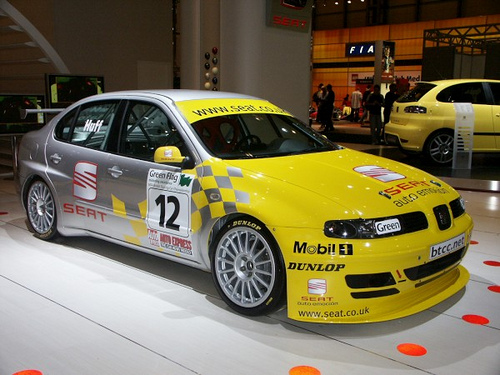
SEAT Toledo Cupra Mk2 (race car)

In 2003, SEAT Sport introduced the SEAT Toledo Cupra Mk2 in the European Touring Car Championship (ETCC) with drivers Jordi Gené, Frank Diefenbacher and former British Touring Car Championship winner Rickard Rydell, while the 'SEAT Sport Italia' Toledo Cupra Mk2 with Gianni Morbidelli also participated as an additional team.

As in 2005, the ETCC became the World Touring Car Championship (WTCC), the SEAT Toledo Cupra Mk2 competed in the WTCC from 2005 to 2006. Peter Terting replaced Diefenbacher, while Jason Plato also joined the team for four rounds and Marc Carol for one round.

In 2004 and 2005 SEAT Sport also ran in the British Touring Car Championship with two SEAT Toledo Cupras Mk2 identical to those used in the European Touring Car Championship under the 'SEAT Sport UK' banner. Initially, the SEAT Sport UK cars were campaigned by RML Group although at the end of the year the partnership was dissolved as RML entered the WTCC with Chevrolet and the team was run by Northern South since 2005.

At the wheel were Jason Plato, Rob Huff, James Pickford and Luke Hines. However, there were also independent teams running with SEAT Toledo Cupras Mk2 till the 2009 British Touring Car Championship season, like the Motorbase Performance, the Team Air Cool/GR Asia, the BTC Racing and the Maxtreme teams.

=== Awards ===
- 'Die besten Autos' 1999 Award, by the German magazine Auto motor und sport
- 'Carro do Ano' Award in 2000, in Portugal

== Third generation (Typ 5P; 2004) ==
Mk3 (5P)
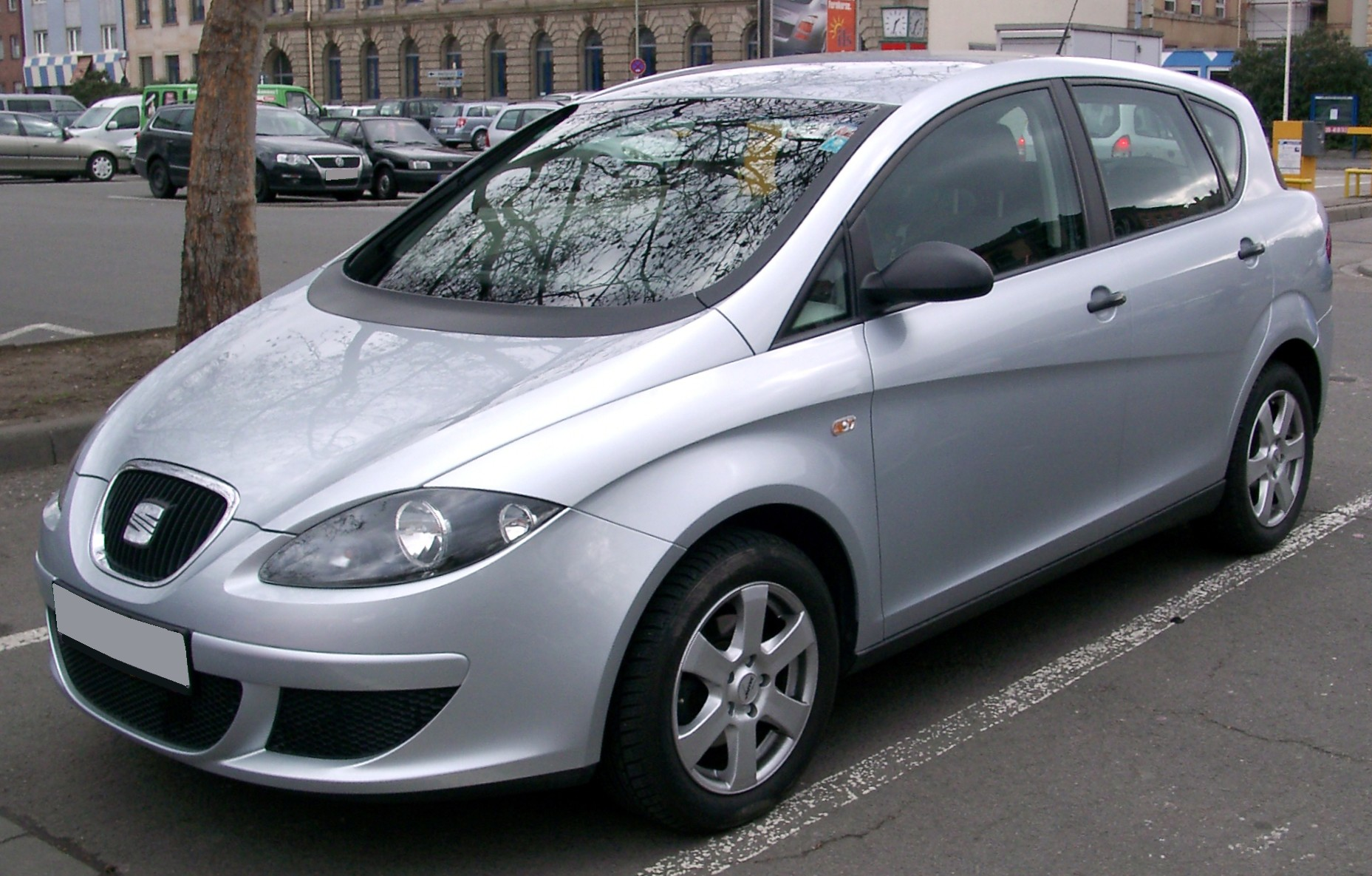

Overview
- Production: February 2004 – May 2009
- Assembly: Spain: Martorell, Catalonia; Ukraine: Solomonovo (Eurocar)
- Designer: Walter de Silva

Body and chassis
- Body style: 5-door hatchback
- Platform: Volkswagen Group A5 (PQ35)
- Related: Audi A3 Mk2; Audi TT Mk2; SEAT León Mk2; SEAT Altea; Volkswagen Golf Mk5; Volkswagen Golf Mk6; Volkswagen Jetta; Škoda Octavia Mk2

Powertrain
- Engine: 1.6 L I4 (petrol); 1.8 L I4 TSI (petrol); 2.0 L I4 FSI (petrol); 1.9 L I4 TDI (diesel); 2.0 L I4 TDI (diesel)

Dimensions
- Wheelbase: 2,580 mm (101.6 in)
- Length: 4,460 mm (175.6 in)
- Width: 1,770 mm (69.7 in)
- Height: 1,570 mm (61.8 in)

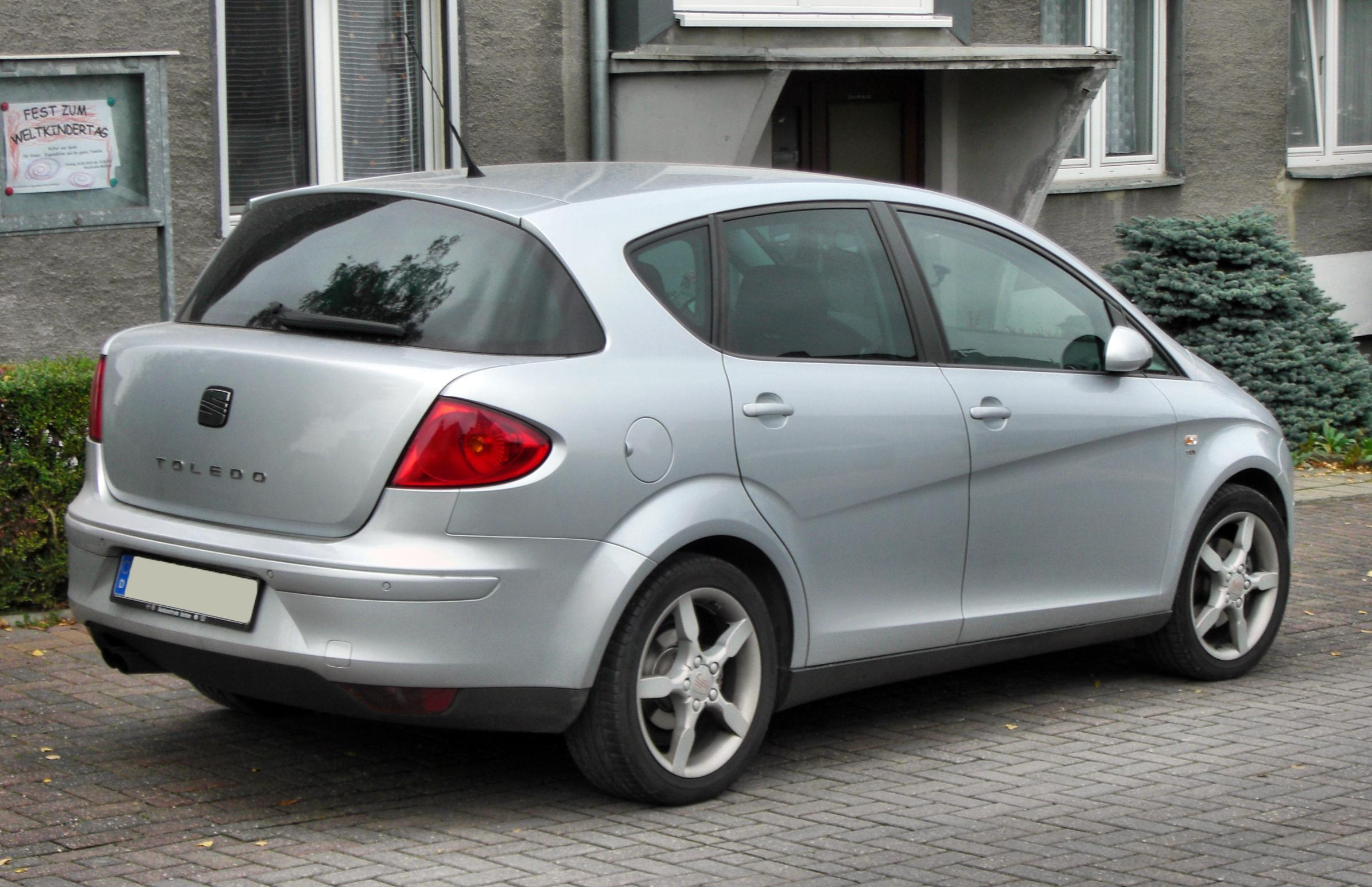
Rear view

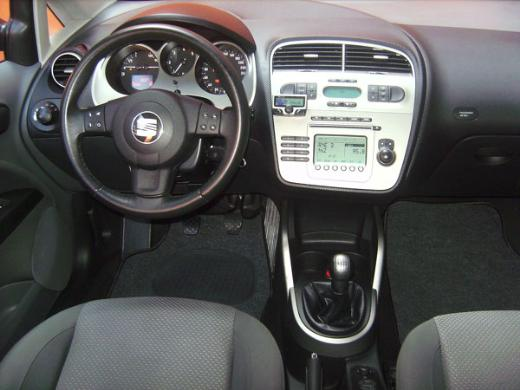
Interior

The third generation Toledo (Typ 5P) was introduced in 2004, and as a production car made its début at the 2004 Paris Motor Show. However, a preview of it had already been revealed at the 2004 Madrid Motor Show, with the presentation of the SEAT Toledo Prototipo. Production lasted from February 2004 to May 2009.

Its bodywork is completely different from the previous two generations: abandoning the traditional three box saloon format, the Toledo Mk3 has a five-door hatchback sedan design penned by Walter de'Silva, although now closer to a compact MPV with the Altea's front section, a high roof, and a rear end inspired by Renault Vel Satis, paying homage to the original Toledo's hatchback/saloon rear.

All pretense of a sporty identity was thrown out, in favour of a more upscale and alternative image. A large five hundred litre DIN boot is an interesting feature, while it can be increased to 1440 litres after folding rear seats. Under the bodywork, the SEAT Toledo uses the same underpinnings as the Volkswagen Golf Mk5.

All engines are identical to other Volkswagen Group units, with petrol engines ranging from 102 PS (75 kW; 101 bhp) to 150 PS (110 kW; 148 bhp) and diesel engines from 105 PS (77 kW; 104 bhp) to 140 PS (103 kW; 138 bhp).

Updates include the arrival of a 170 PS (125 kW; 168 bhp) TDI engine in 2006, as well as a tiptronic gearbox in the 2.0 FSI model. A 1.8 L turbocharged version of this engine became available in the middle of 2007.

=== Engine specifications ===
The internal combustion engines used are the same as for many other cars in the Volkswagen Group, and are all inline four cylinder engines.

engine name	engine code(s)	valvetrain	displacement	max. power at rpm	max. torque at rpm
Petrol engines
1.4*	BXW	DOHC 16v	1390 cc	86 PS (63 kW; 85 bhp) at 5,000	132 N⋅m (97 lbf⋅ft) at 3,800
1.6 MPI	BGU/BSE/BSF/CCSA	DOHC 8v	1598 cc	115 PS (85 kW; 113 bhp) at 5,600	148 N⋅m (109 lbf⋅ft) at 3,800
1.8 TSI	BZB	DOHC 16v	1798 cc	160 PS (118 kW; 158 bhp) at 5,000	250 N⋅m (184 lbf⋅ft) at 1,500
2.0 FSI	BLR/BVY	DOHC 16v	1984 cc	150 PS (110 kW; 148 bhp) at 6,000	200 N⋅m (148 lbf⋅ft) at 3,250
2.0 TFSI	BWA	DOHC 16v	1984 cc	200 PS (147 kW; 197 bhp) at 5,100	280 N⋅m (207 lbf⋅ft) at 1,800
Diesel engines
1.9 TDI	BJB/BKC/BXE/BLS	SOHC 8v	1896 cc	105 PS (77 kW; 104 bhp) at 4,000	250 N⋅m (184 lbf⋅ft) at 1,900
2.0 TDI	AZV	DOHC 16v	1968 cc	136 PS (100 kW; 134 bhp) at 4,000	320 N⋅m (236 lbf⋅ft) at 1,750
2.0 TDI	BKD	DOHC 16v	1968 cc	140 PS (103 kW; 138 bhp) at 4,000	320 N⋅m (236 lbf⋅ft) at 1,750
2.0 TDI DPF	BMM	SOHC 8v	1968 cc	140 PS (103 kW; 138 bhp) at 4,000	320 N⋅m (236 lbf⋅ft) at 1,750
2.0 TDI DPF	BMN	DOHC 16v	1968 cc	170 PS (125 kW; 168 bhp) at 4,200	350 N⋅m (258 lbf⋅ft) at 1,750

* only for some export markets

=== Reliability ===
Along with other SEATs, the Toledo has been a markedly reliable vehicle – more so than the Audi A3 and Volkswagen Golf, with which it shares platforms. In May 2006, Warranty Direct, a provider based in the United Kingdom of mechanical warranties for used cars, rated the Toledo with a higher reliability index compared to the Golf produced over the same period and the Audi A3.

In 2010, and though out of production, the Warranty direct's Reliability index marks that the SEAT Toledo still ranks within the list of the United Kingdom's one hundred most reliable cars of the last decade.

== Fourth generation (Typ KG; 2012) ==
Mk4 (KG)
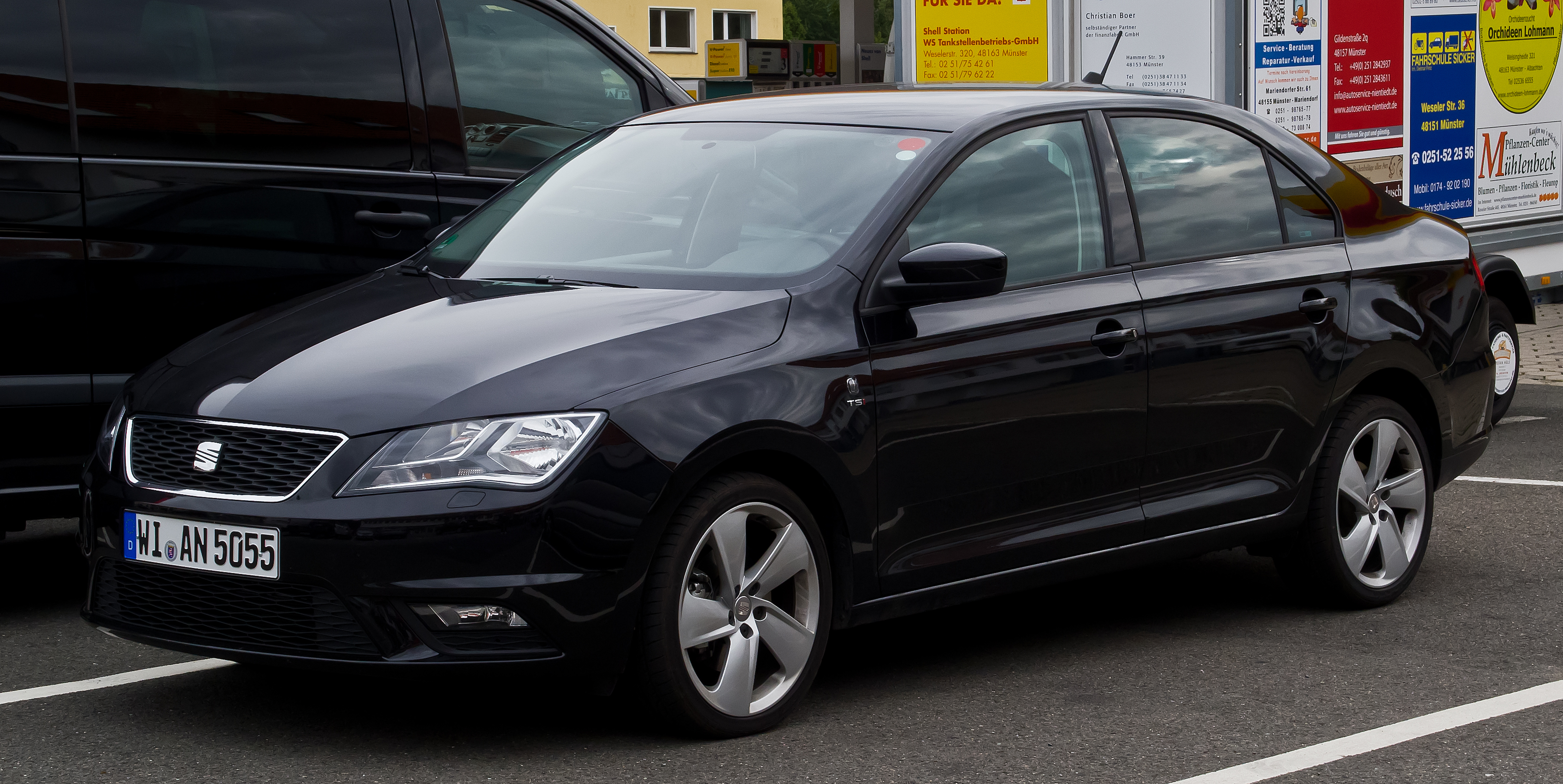

Overview
- Manufacturer: Škoda Auto
- Production: Late 2012 – February 2019
- Assembly: Czechia: Mladá Boleslav (Škoda Auto)

Body and chassis
- Body style: 5-door liftback
- Platform: Volkswagen Group A05+
- Related: Škoda Rapid; Volkswagen Santana; Volkswagen Jetta Night; Jetta VA3

Powertrain
- Engine: 1.0 L I3 TSI (petrol); 1.2 L I3 MPI (petrol); 1.2 L I4 TSI (petrol); 1.4 L I4 TSI (petrol); 1.4 L I3 TDI (diesel); 1.6 L I4 TDI (diesel)

Dimensions
- Wheelbase: 2,602 mm (102.4 in)
- Length: 4,482 mm (176.5 in)
- Width: 1,713 mm (67.4 in)
- Height: 1,461 mm (57.5 in)
- Kerb weight: 1,140–1,254 kg (2,513–2,765 lb)

Chronology
- Predecessor: SEAT Córdoba

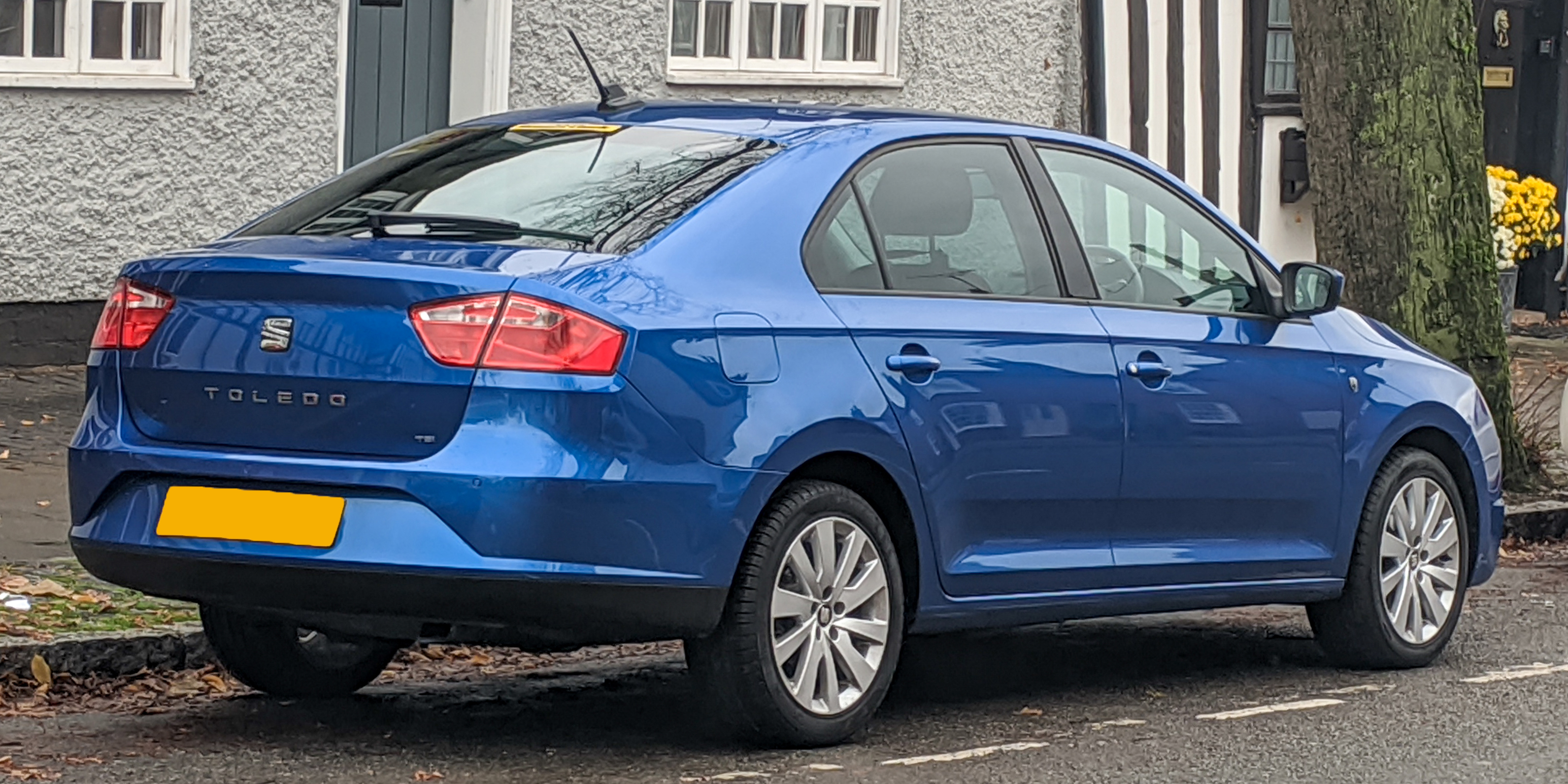
Rear view

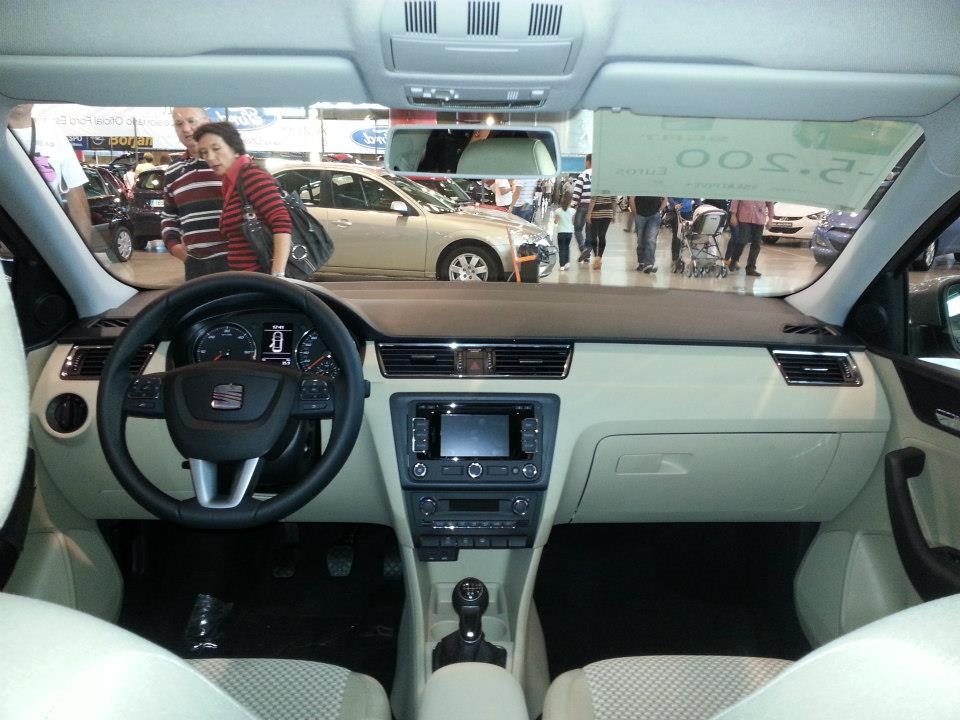
Interior

SEAT released an Audi A4 (B7) based large family car called the SEAT Exeo in October 2008, with both four door saloon and five door estate bodystyles. The Exeo was not intended as a direct replacement for the Toledo according to the company, although production of the Toledo was ended in May 2009, due to low sales.

A concept car based on the Toledo Mk4 production model was presented at the 2012 Geneva Motor Show. This vehicle is closely related to the Škoda Rapid as a five-door liftback, both are based on an adaptation of the A05+ (PQ25) platform and are assembled in the same Škoda factory in Mladá Boleslav.

The Toledo commenced sales in Spain and Portugal towards the end of 2012, and the rest of Europe and Mexico in the beginning of 2013, with the all new Toledo sitting in between the smaller Ibiza supermini and the larger León small family car.

The Toledo received a five star rating in the Euro NCAP.

The Toledo was pulled from UK sales lineup due to poor sales in November 2018. In February 2019, the Toledo ended production although sales in selected markets continued well into 2020.

=== Special Editions ===
==== Toledo CONNECT ====
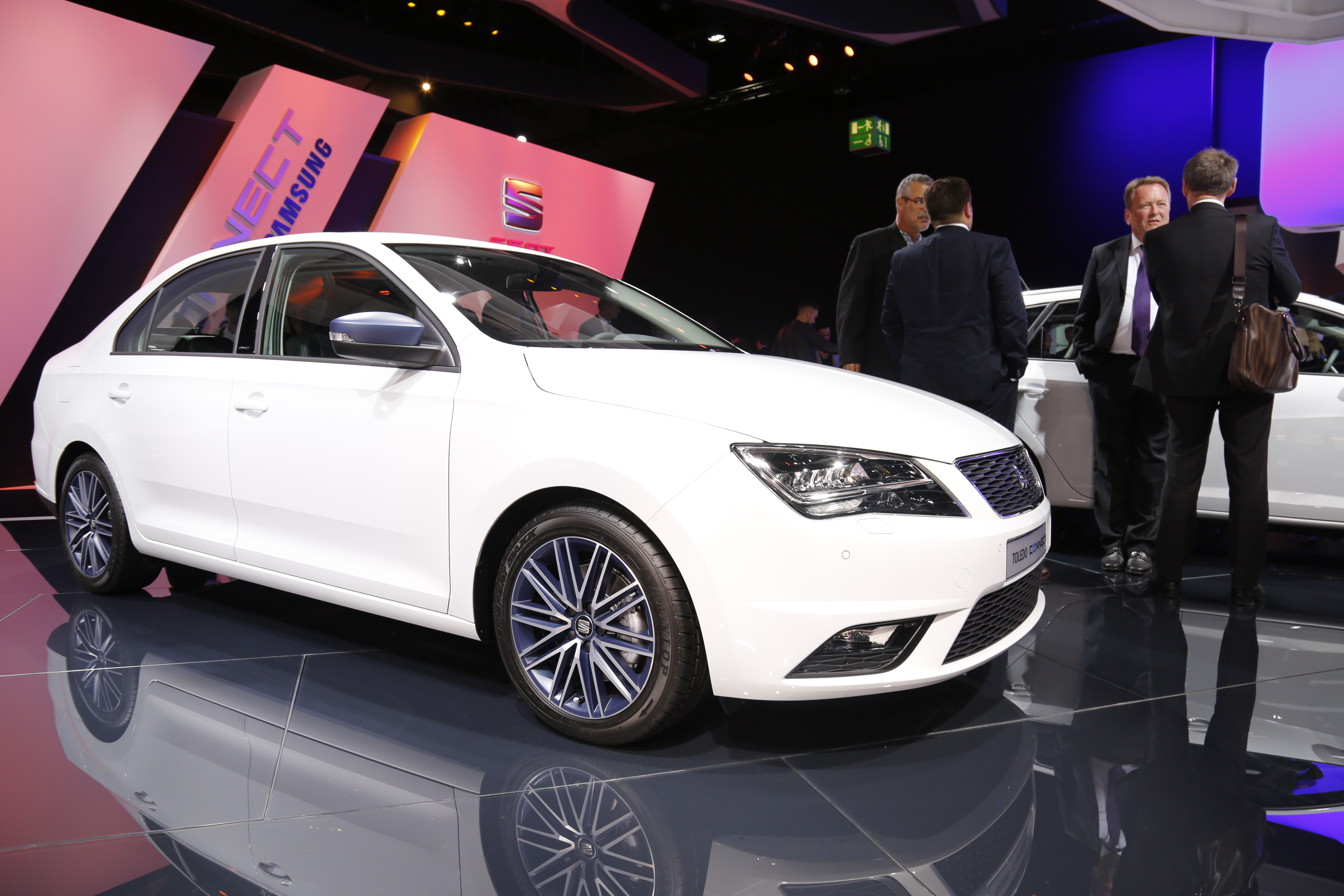
A white SEAT Toledo CONNECT edition at the Frankfurt Motor Show

The SEAT Toledo CONNECT is part of a special edition line presented at the 2015 Frankfurt Motor Show. This model is equipped with Full Link Technology and a Samsung Galaxy A3 smartphone. This allows the user to connect to the car and access connectivity features of the SEAT ConnectApp right on the dashboard.

The SEAT Toledo CONNECT is available in a range of exterior body colours that also allow the mirrors and wheels to be customised. Interior details, including stitching are in blue.

=== Engine specifications ===
engine name	engine code(s)	engine configuration	displacement	max. power at rpm	max. torque at rpm
Petrol engines
1.2 MPI		inline-3 DOHC 12v	1,198 cc (73 cu in)	75 PS (55 kW; 74 bhp) at 5,400	112 N⋅m (83 lbf⋅ft) at 3,750
1.2 TSI		inline-4 SOHC 8v	1,197 cc (73 cu in)	85 PS (63 kW; 84 bhp) at 4,800	160 N⋅m (118 lbf⋅ft) at 1,500-3,500
1.2 TSI Ecomotive		inline-4 SOHC 8v	1,197 cc (73 cu in)	105 PS (77 kW; 104 bhp) at 5,000	175 N⋅m (129 lbf⋅ft) at 1,550-4,100
1.4 TSI		inline-4 DOHC 16v	1,390 cc (85 cu in)	122 PS (90 kW; 120 bhp) at 5,000	200 N⋅m (148 lbf⋅ft) at 1,500-4,000
Diesel engines
1.4 TDI		inline-3 DOHC 12v	1,422 cc (87 cu in)	90 PS (66 kW; 89 bhp) at 3,500	230 N⋅m (170 lbf⋅ft) at 1,750-2,500
1.6 TDI		inline-4 DOHC 16v	1,598 cc (98 cu in)	90 PS (66 kW; 89 bhp) at 4,200	230 N⋅m (170 lbf⋅ft) at 1,500-2,500
1.6 TDI Ecomotive		inline-4 DOHC 16v	1,598 cc (98 cu in)	105 PS (77 kW; 104 bhp) at 4,400	250 N⋅m (184 lbf⋅ft) at 1,500-2,500

=== Critical reception ===
The fourth generation of the Toledo received generally negative reviews from critics. In October 2014, Top Gear Magazine placed the Toledo on its list of The Worst Cars You Can Buy Right Now. What Car? awarded it 2 stars out of 5, noting that the Toledo is "at odds with the sporty image SEAT likes to portray its cars as having" while also having a firm ride. Criticism was targeted towards the hard plastics in its interior as well. On the positive side, they've praised the Toledo's big boot, rear legroom and frugality. Autocar was slightly more positive, awarding it 3 stars out of 5, calling it a "no-nonsense family car", but criticised its driver appeal and bland design.

== Sales and production figures ==
1,019,636 SEAT Toledos have been produced during 4 generations.

The total production per year of SEAT Toledo cars, manufactured in SEAT is shown in the following table.

model	1990	1991	1992	1993	1994	1995	1996	1997	1998	1999
SEAT Toledo	41	76,336	144,205	90,533	47,965	55,493	53,404	42,596	42,325	105,818

Model	2000	2001	2002	2003	2004	2005	2006	2007	2008	2009
SEAT Toledo	59,480	47,645	39,503	36,026	38,962	20,600	8,613	4,744	5,484	571

Model	2010	2011	2012	2013	2014	2015	2016	2017	2018	2019
SEAT Toledo	—	—	5,000	21,771	16,541	19,728	18,029	13,146	10,151	1,506
