= Dodge Hornet (concept car) =

American mini MPV concept

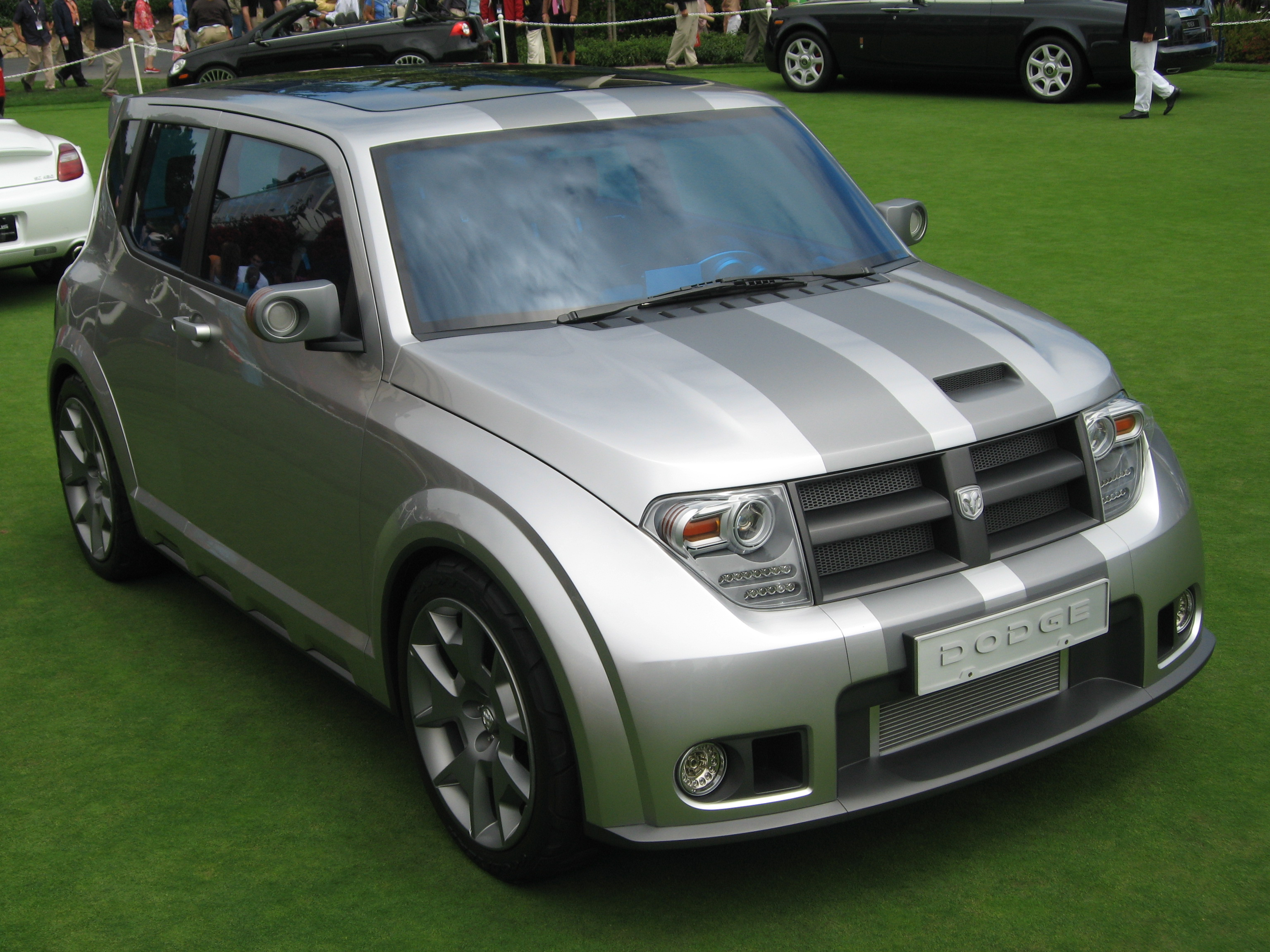
- 2006 Dodge Hornet concept

Overview
- Manufacturer: Dodge (Chrysler)

Body and chassis
- Class: Concept car Mini MPV
- Body style: 5-door hatchback
- Layout: Front-engine, front-wheel drive
- Doors: Conventional doors (front)/Coach doors (rear)

Powertrain
- Engine: 1.6 L Tritec Chrysler-engineered (T16b4) straight-4 (Supercharged)
- Transmission: 6-speed manual

Dimensions
- Wheelbase: 100 in (2,540 mm)
- Length: 151 in (3,835 mm)
- Width: 76 in (1,930 mm)
- Height: 62 in (1,575 mm)
- Curb weight: 3,106 lb (1,409 kg)

The Dodge Hornet was a concept car mini MPV designed and developed by Dodge and revealed in 2006. Dodge's first attempt at building a car this small, the car was expected to be released in 2010, but following the Great Recession and the restructuring of the Chrysler Group, the concept was dropped.

First used on a revolutionary Hudson model and then AMC, rights to the "Hornet" name passed to Chrysler (Dodge's parent) with its acquisition of American Motors Corporation (AMC) in 1987.

== Development ==
In 2006, Dodge was preparing for entry into the European market with a B-segment model and began the European car show circuit displaying the Dodge Hornet mini MPV concept. The objective was to launch the Dodge nameplate and produce a mini-sized vehicle aimed exclusively at young urban consumers in Europe. According to Dieter Zetsche, Chairman of DaimlerChrysler (as the companies were merged at that time), the automaker was looking to use an existing small car platform, which might first have been from Mitsubishi and then Volkswagen's Polo was considered.

By 2008, the Hornet was planned to be the first product from the cooperation between Chrysler and Nissan, sharing the platform of the Nissan Versa.

According to Dodge, the 2006 concept car was a rally inspired design, powered by a 1.6 L supercharged 4-cylinder Tritec engine rated at 170 hp (127 kW; 172 PS). This engine was capable of launching the car from 0 to 60 mph (0 to 97 km/h) in 7.5 seconds, and had an estimated top speed of 135 mph (217 km/h). This engine was manufactured in a Chrysler-BMW joint venture in Brazil.

The original plans for Dodge's first attempt at building a car this small was a 2010 market introduction, but the Great Recession combined with the Chrysler Chapter 11 reorganization put a stop to further development.

== Fiat connection ==
Following the merger with Fiat in late 2010, it took on a new and unrevealed identity that would have more likely shared Fiat's 199 platform with the Alfa Romeo MiTo. Designed to compete against the Mini (BMW), the new Hornet was expected to be released somewhere between 2011 and 2013. In May 2011, Chrysler had stated that a 40 mpg_{‑US} (5.9 L/100 km; 48 mpg_{‑imp}) capable subcompact vehicle with a new model name would be released in late 2011, as the first of the 2012 model year lineup.

Known inside the company as the "PF," test vehicles purported to be the 2013 Dodge Hornet featuring a hatchback design were extensively photographed during 2011. The new compact was to "be called the Dodge Hornet, in homage not only to the well-received 2006 concept car that carried the name but also to an ancestry of vehicles stretching back 60 years to the original Hudson Hornet." Although almost universally called Dodge Hornet by the automotive media, other potential names included continuing the Caliber and even resurrecting Neon for the new car to compete against the Ford Focus and Chevrolet Cruze.

Further test vehicles were a traditional four-door sedan body style based on the Alfa Romeo Giulietta, an altogether different platform from the 2006 mini MPV Dodge Hornet concept vehicle. Late in 2011, the automaker surprised industry pundits and insiders with an announcement that its new small sedan, which was to be revealed fully at the North American International Auto Show in January 2012, would be called the Dart.
