= Chery Fulwin (1999) =

Compact sedan, Chery's first vehicle

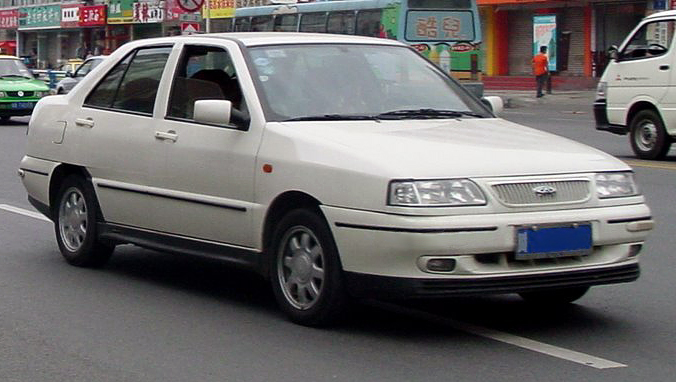

Overview
- Manufacturer: Chery
- Model code: CAC6340, SQR7160
- Also called: Chery A11; Chery Windcloud
- Production: 1999 – 2006 (China); 2008 (Jordan)

Body and chassis
- Class: Compact car
- Body style: 5-door liftback
- Layout: Front-engine, front-wheel-drive
- Related: SEAT Toledo Mk. I Chery Cowin

Powertrain
- Engine: Petrol: 1.6 L SQR480 I4; 1.6 L T16b3 I4; 1.6 L ACTECO I4
- Power output: 65 kW (87 hp; 88 PS) (SQR480)
- Transmission: 5-speed manual

Dimensions
- Wheelbase: 2,468 mm (97.2 in); 2,648 mm (104.3 in) (LWB)
- Length: 4,335 mm (170.7 in); 4,515 mm (177.8 in) (LWB)
- Width: 1,682 mm (66.2 in)
- Height: 1,424 mm (56.1 in)

Chronology
- Successor: Chery Cowin

The Chery Fulwin (Chinese: 风云; pinyin: Fēngyún; lit. 'Wind cloud'), also sold as the Chery A11, is Chery's first car. Created without government approval, it has nonetheless been the first step of Chery's success story and helped transform the Chinese automotive market from one dependent on foreign joint ventures.

Various importers and other commenters have also called the car "Windcloud" (direct translation of Chinese word "Fengyun") or "Fulwin" (romanized equivalent of the "Fengyun" name introduced by Chery after 2009).

== Development ==
The Fulwin is essentially a badge engineered first generation Toledo, built by SEAT from 1991 to 1999, based on the A2 platform. This is the same platform used by FAW-VW Automobile for their successful, license-built FAW-VW Jetta. Windcloud production indeed depended on secret side deals with the same parts suppliers as did FAW-VW. A later financial settlement out of court meant Volkswagen Group agreed to abstain from a planned lawsuit. The purchase of the Toledo blueprints was also executed in secret, in spite of SEAT being a Volkswagen Group subsidiary: all of these deft negotiations were the work of engineer Yin Tongyao, who had originally worked for Volkswagen Group's Chinese joint venture.

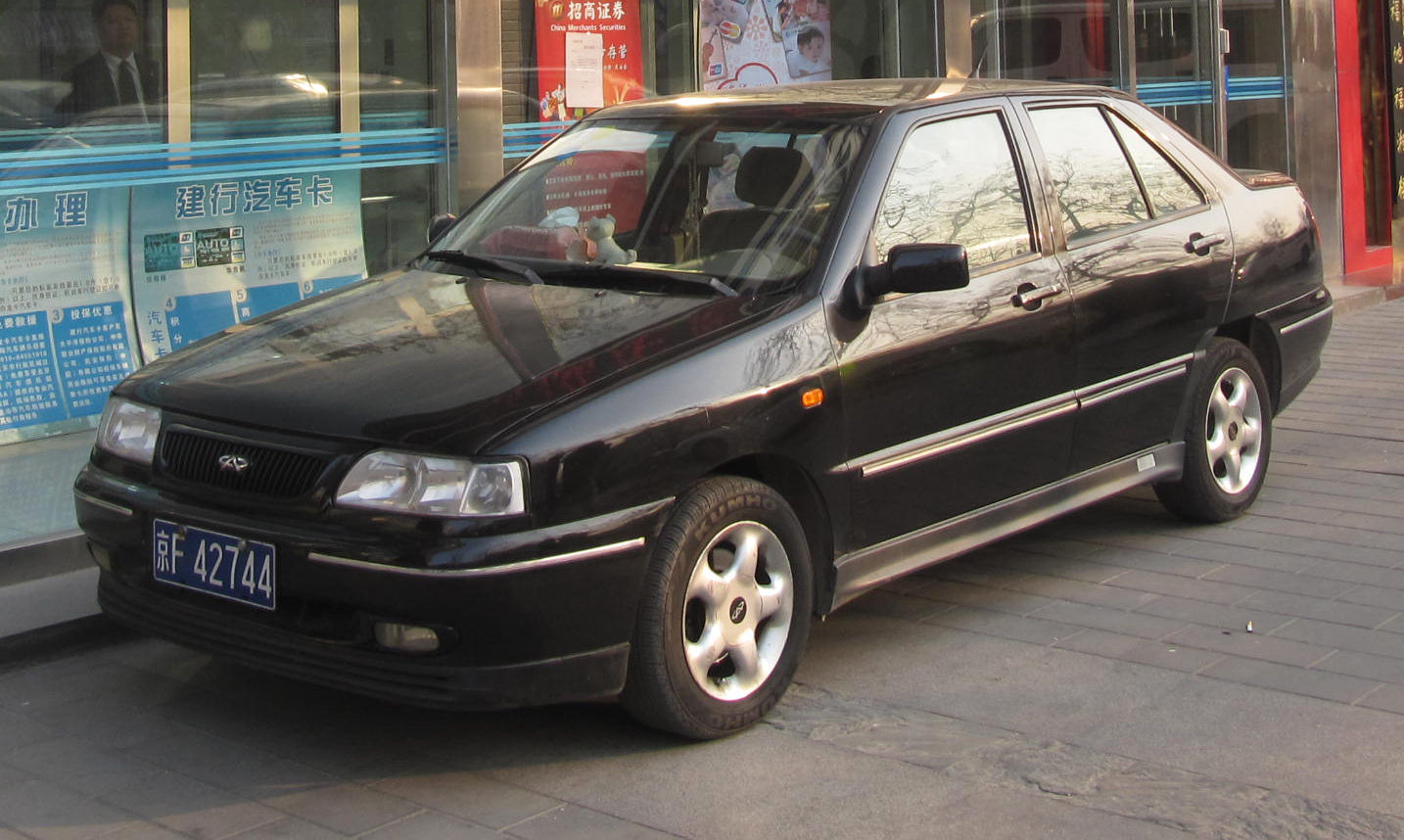
Chery Fulwin

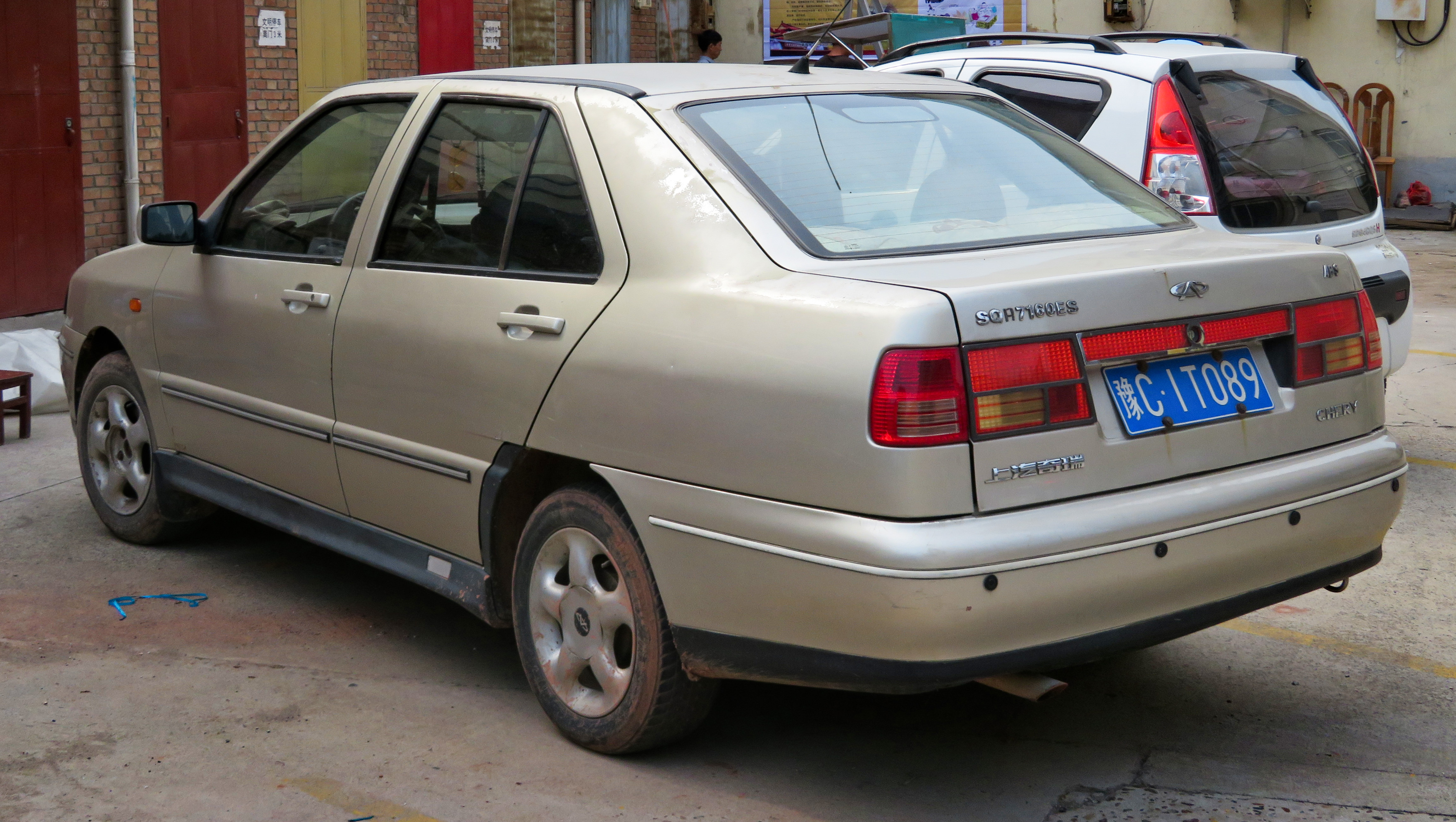
rear view

Yin was originally poached by the government of Wuhu, in Anhui province, after they had reached the decision to develop a car for local production. Yin had also quietly purchased the production line for a rather outdated Ford engine (the 1.6 CVH) in England, which he then transferred to Anhui: the first engines left the production line in May 1999. This was to be the first engine installed in the Windcloud. It was later replaced by the more modern Tritec and Acteco engines. At the time, China had very strict regulations hindering the entry of new players into the automotive industry, so for nearly two years Chery was officially only producing "automotive components", albeit in a fully assembled form. In 2001, Chery finally received government permission to market their cars nationwide.

Production of the A11 began in December 1999 as the CAC6340. The name was officially changed to Fengyun, codenamed SQR7160, in 2000, and Chinese production ended in 2006. A long wheelbase version codenamed SQR7160EL was released in 2003, and the Chery A15, first presented in 2003, is a facelifted Windcloud.
