= Chery Cowin =

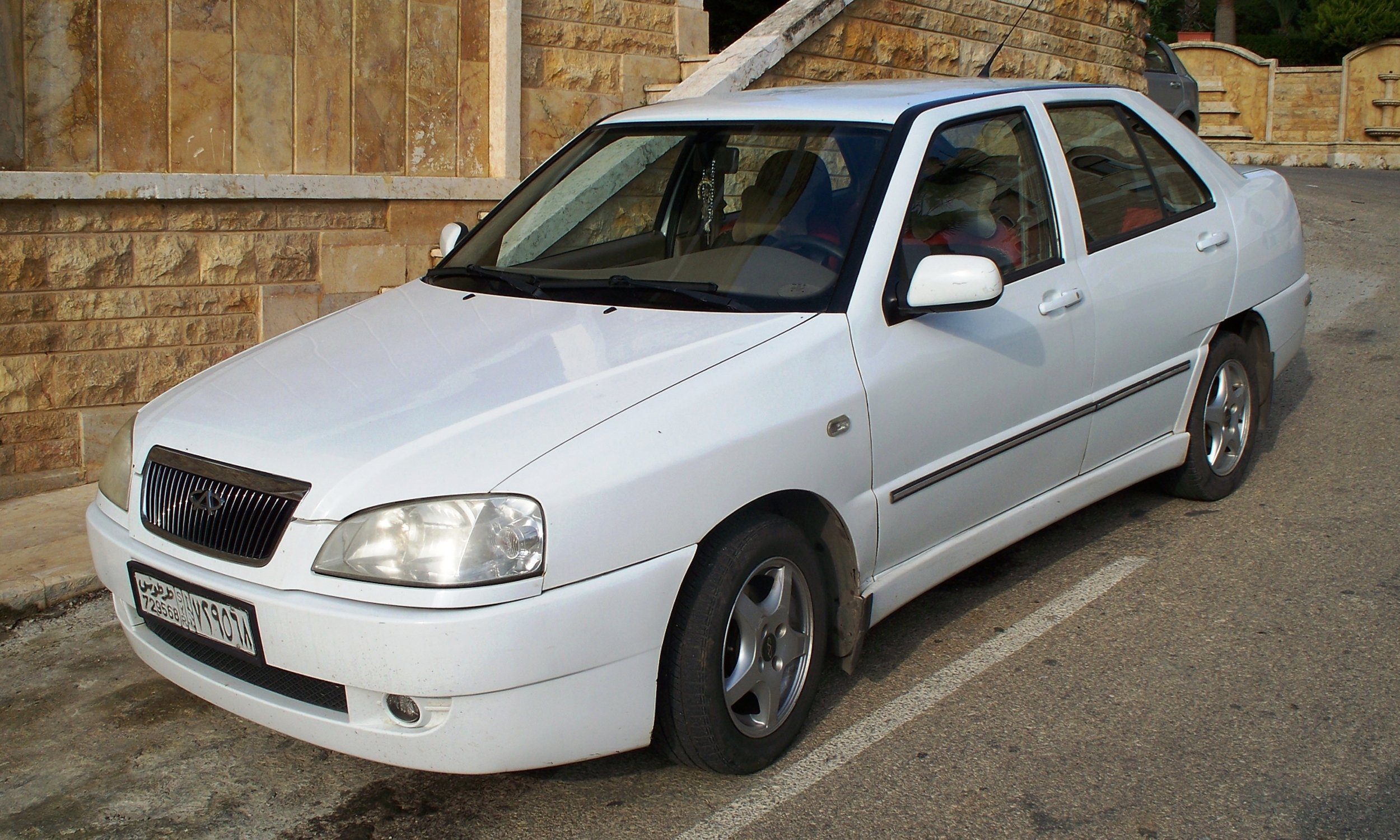

Overview
- Manufacturer: Chery
- Also called: Chery A15; Chery A168; Chery Amulet; Chery Flagcloud; Chery Qiyun; Chery Viana; Vortex Corda
- Production: 2003–2016
- Assembly: China: Wuhu, Anhui; Ukraine: Zaporizhzhia (ZAZ); Russia: Kaliningrad (Avtotor, from 2006 to 2008); Russia: Taganrog (TagAZ); Iran: Mashhad (Sanabad Khodro)

Body and chassis
- Class: Compact car
- Body style: 5-door liftback
- Related: SEAT Toledo Mk. I

Powertrain
- Engine: 1.5 L SQR477F I4 (petrol)
- Transmission: 5-speed manual

Dimensions
- Wheelbase: 2,468 mm (97.2 in)
- Length: 4,393 mm (173.0 in)
- Width: 1,682 mm (66.2 in)
- Height: 1,424 mm (56.1 in)
- Curb weight: 1,140 kg (2,513 lb)

Chronology
- Predecessor: Chery Fulwin
- Successor: Chery Fulwin 2

The Chery Cowin (simplified Chinese: 旗云; pinyin: Qiyun), also known as Chery A15, Flagcloud, or Amulet, is a compact car produced by the Chinese manufacturer Chery from 2003 to 2010. A facelifted variant was called the Cowin 2 and was sold from 2010 to 2016.

== Overview ==
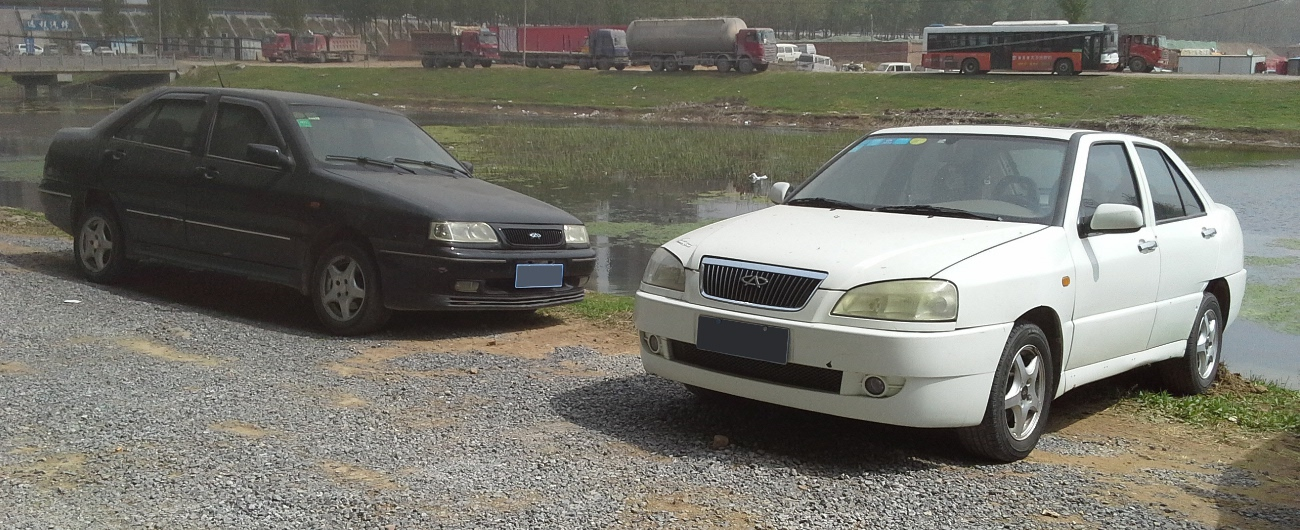
Chery Fulwin (left) & Chery Cowin (right)

The Cowin is a restyled Chery Fengyun, itself based on the first generation of the SEAT Toledo. The vehicle also has a fuel-efficient, low-emission engine. It has been marketed in South America and in European countries such as Ukraine and Russia.

It was launched in August 2003, as a successor to the A11, and has been exported to more than 30 countries in Southeast Asia, Latin America, and Eastern Europe. In 2010, it was locally assembled and went on sale in Russia as the Vortex Corda in 2012.

== Safety ==
It has several safety features, including anti-lock brakes and electronic brakeforce distribution. However, the Russian car magazine Autoreview reported that an Cowin it had crashed in accordance with the Euro NCAP test standard performed even worse than the 1-starred Brilliance BS6 sedan and that the dummy used had to be dismantled into pieces in order to be removed. Consequently, Autoreview called for the car to be withdrawn from the market.

== Gallery ==
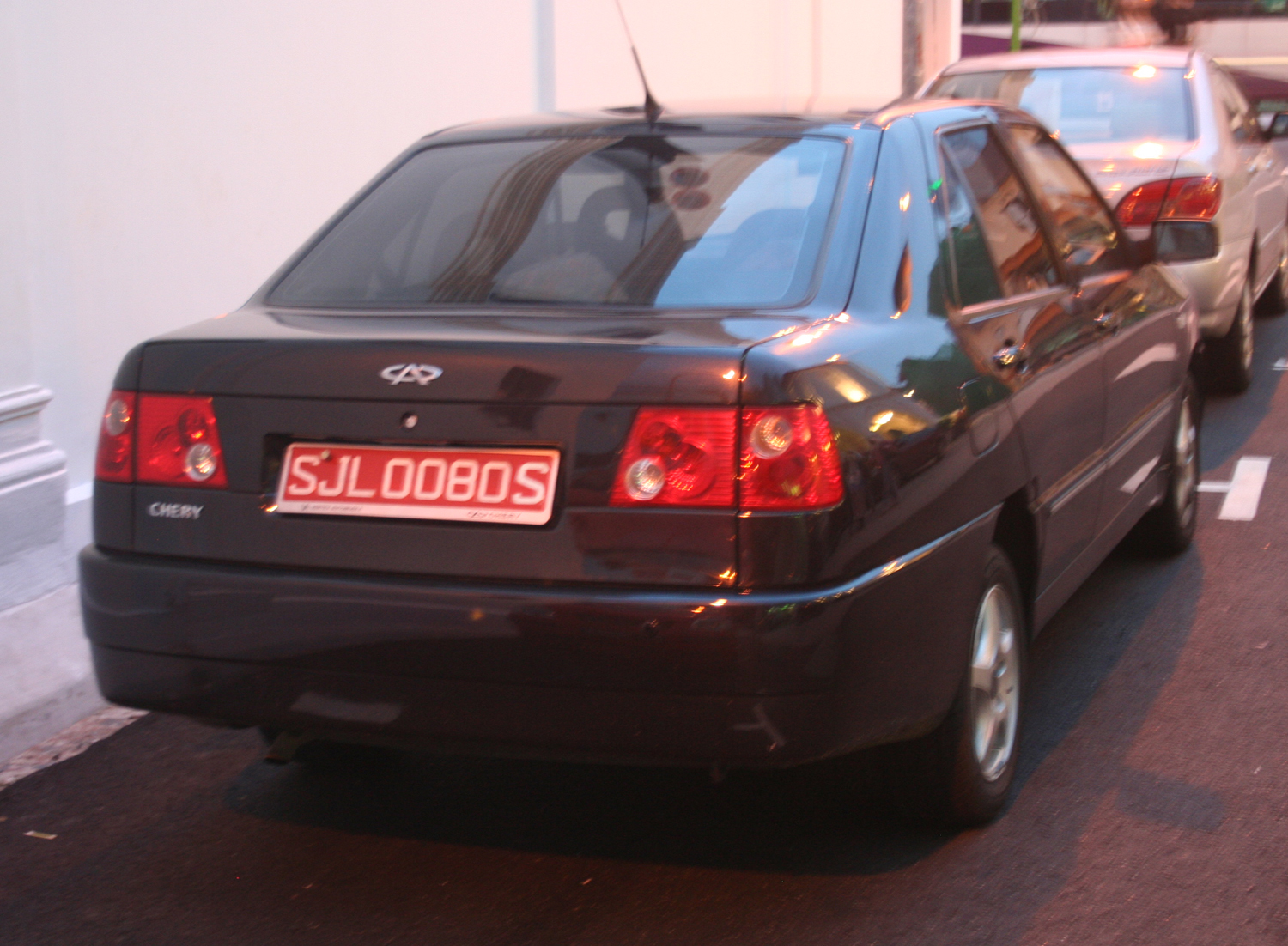
Chery A168 rear view

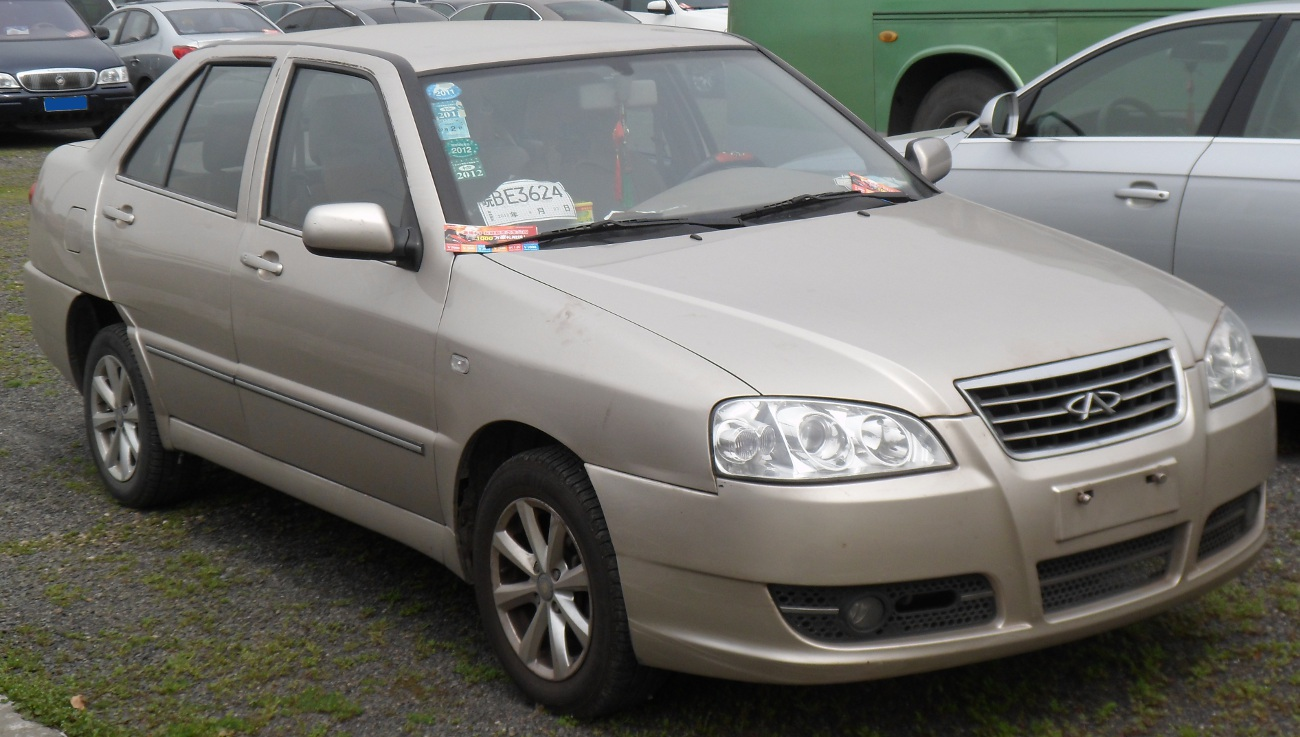
Chery Cowin 2

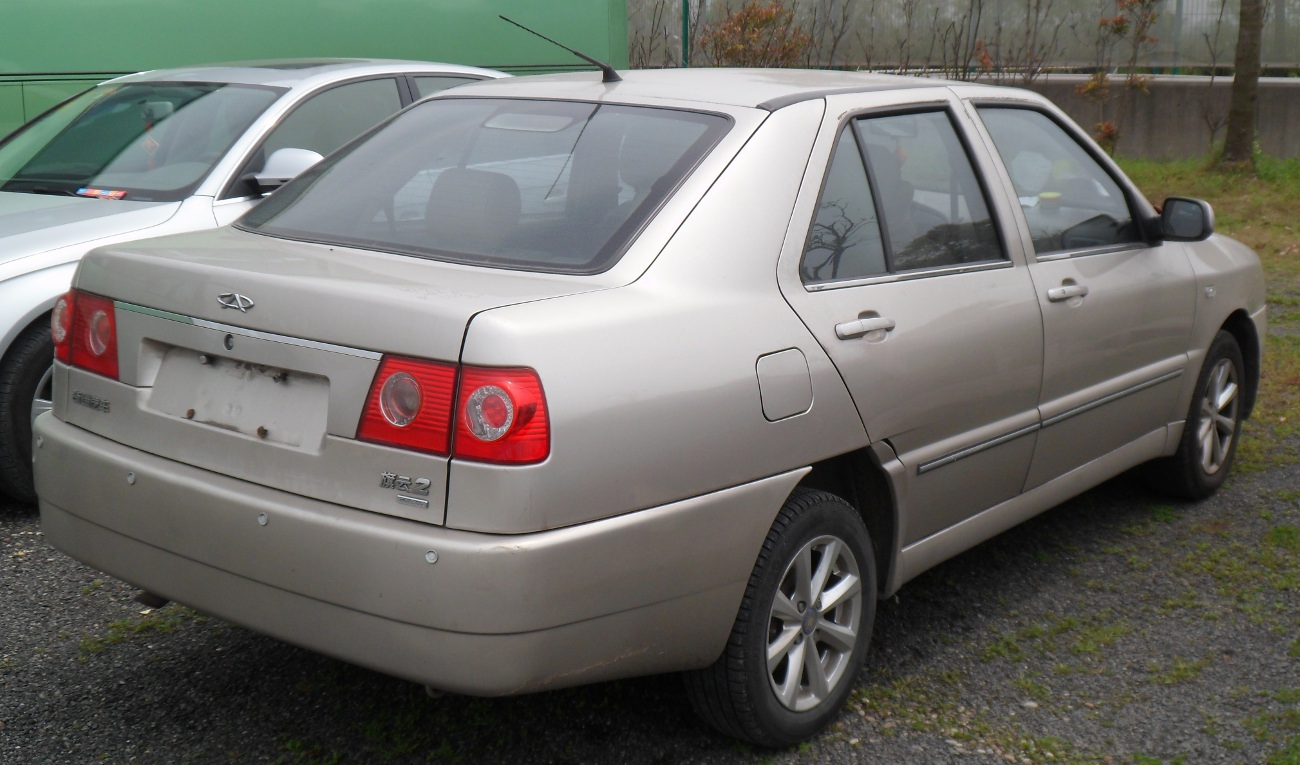
Chery Cowin 2 rear

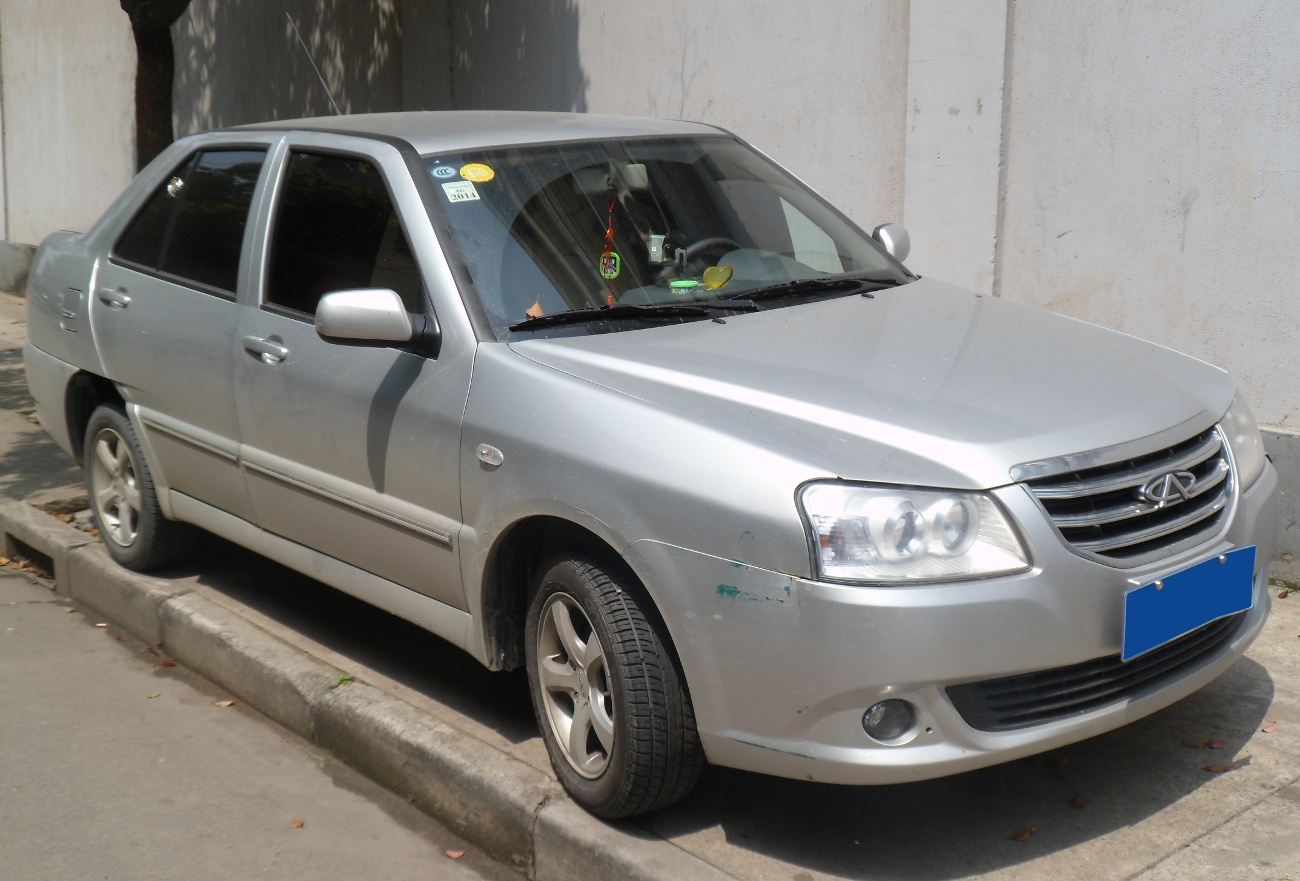
Chery Cowin 2 facelift

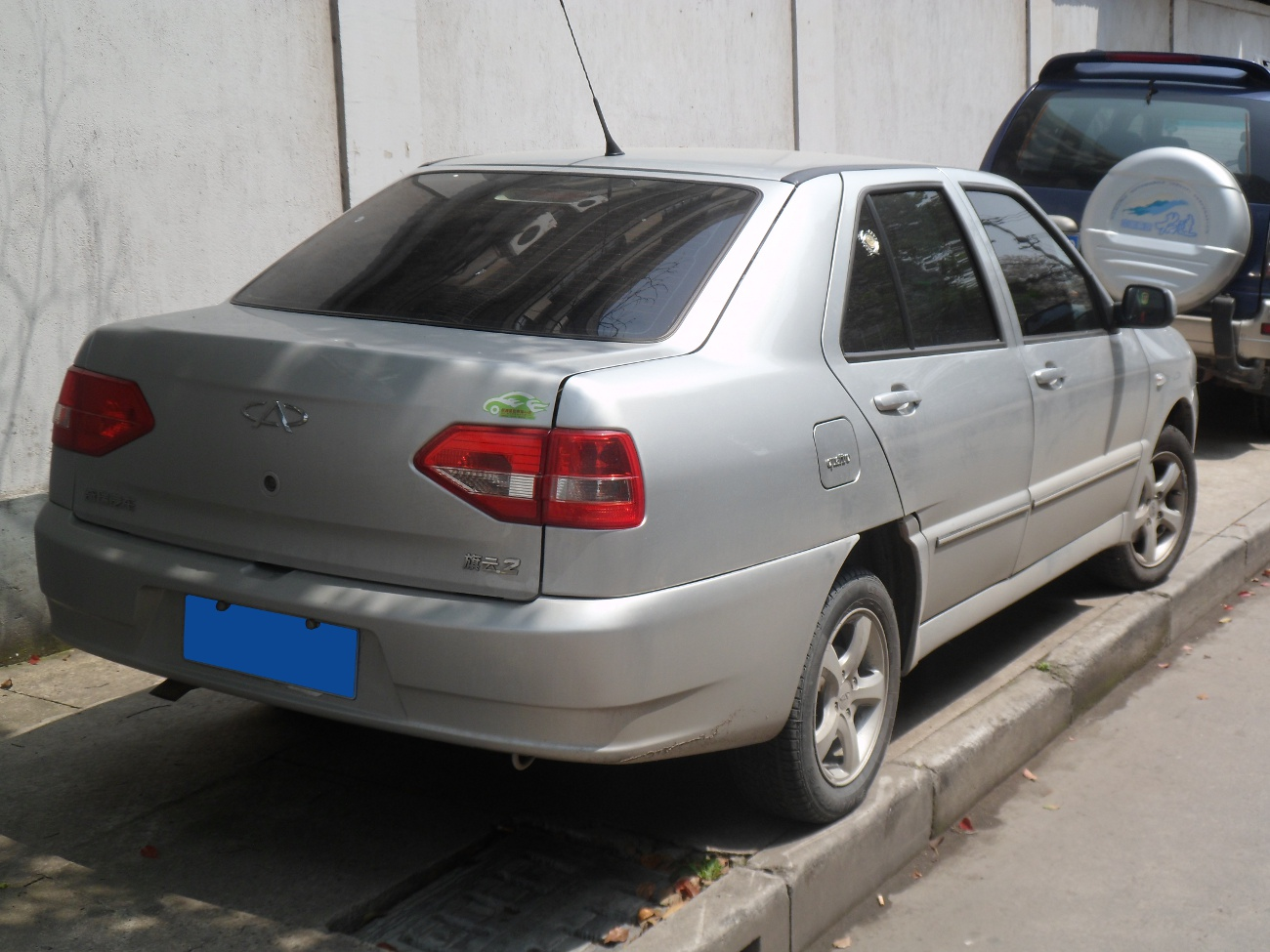
Chery Cowin 2 facelift rear
