= Volkswagen Golf Mk6 =

Sixth generation of Golf compact car

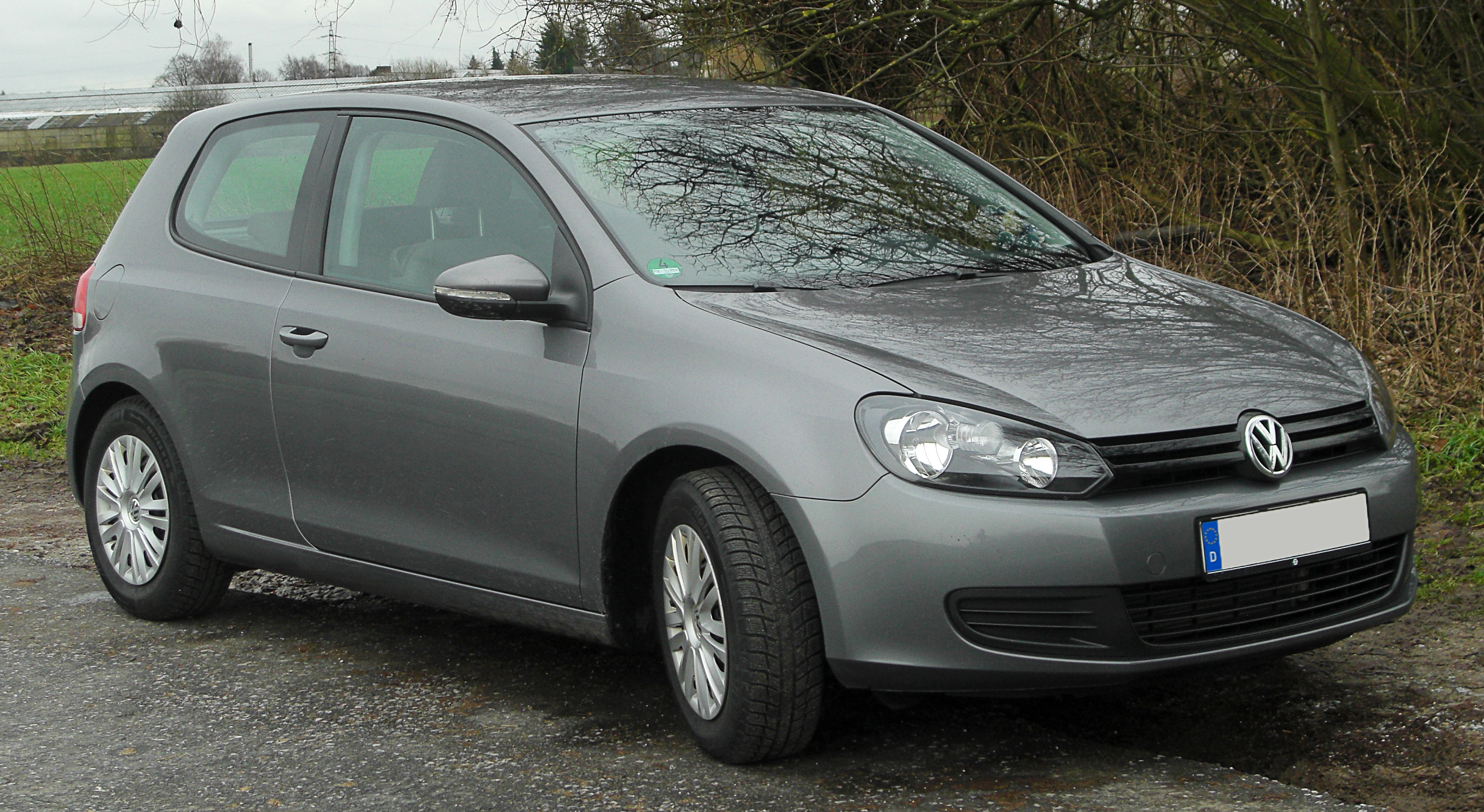

Overview
- Manufacturer: Volkswagen
- Model code: 5K
- Also called: Volkswagen Jetta SportWagen (United States, wagon); Volkswagen Vento Variant (Argentina and Uruguay, wagon)
- Production: 2008–2013; 2009–2013 (wagon); 2011–2016 (cabriolet)
- Model years: 2009-2012
- Assembly: Germany: Wolfsburg (Wolfsburg Plant); Osnabrück (VW Osnabrück; cabriolet only); South Africa: Uitenhage; Belgium: Brussels (Audi Brussels); China: Changchun (FAW-VW); Mexico: Puebla (wagon only); Ukraine: Solomonovo (Eurocar); Indonesia: Jakarta (National Assemblers)
- Designer: Walter de Silva

Body and chassis
- Class: Compact car/small family car (C)
- Body style: 3/5-door hatchback 5-door estate/wagon 2-door cabriolet
- Layout: Front-engine, front-wheel-drive Front-engine, all-wheel-drive (4Motion)
- Platform: Volkswagen Group A5 (PQ35) platform
- Related: Volkswagen Eos; Volkswagen Golf Plus; Volkswagen Jetta (A5); Volkswagen Scirocco Mk3; Audi A3 Mk2

Powertrain
- Engine: Petrol: 1.2 L EA211 TSI I4; 1.4 L EA111 I4; 1.4 L EA211 TSI I4; 1.6 L EA827 I4; 1.8 L EA888 TSI I4; 2.0 L EA888 TSI I4; 2.5 L EA855 I5; Diesel: 1.6 L EA189 TDI I4 CR; 2.0 L EA189 TDI I4 CR
- Transmission: 5/6-speed manual 6-speed automatic (Tiptronic); 6/7-speed DSG

Dimensions
- Wheelbase: 2,578 mm (101.5 in)
- Length: 4,199 mm (165.3 in); GTI: 4,213 mm (165.9 in)
- Width: 1,779 mm (70.0 in)
- Height: 1,479 mm (58.2 in); GTI: 1,469 mm (57.8 in)
- Kerb weight: 1,217–1,541 kg (2,683–3,397 lb)

Chronology
- Predecessor: Volkswagen Golf Mk5; Volkswagen Eos (Golf Cabriolet only); Volkswagen Bora HS (China)
- Successor: Volkswagen Golf Mk7; Volkswagen T-Roc (Cabriolet models only)

The Volkswagen Golf Mk6 (code named Typ 5K) is a compact car and the sixth generation of the Volkswagen Golf. The Volkswagen Golf Mk6 is the successor to the Volkswagen Golf Mk5 and It was unveiled at the Paris Motor Show in October 2008 for the 2009 model year.

The new model was largely based on its predecessor, the Golf Mk5, and was effectively a re-engineered facelift of the previous model. In January 2013, it was superseded by the Volkswagen Golf Mk7, which was built on the newly assembled MQB platform.

== Overview ==
Volkswagen released pictures and information on 6 August 2008, prior to the official unveiling. The vehicle officially started sales in Europe in late 2008. Volkswagen claimed investments were made in production efficiency, with a claimed productivity improvement at launch of nearly 20% in comparison with the previous model, with further gains planned for the first twelve months of production. This model year was also a part of the Dieselgate scandal.

Like its predecessor, the Mk6 Golf is based on the Volkswagen Group A5 (PQ35) platform. It is effectively a reskin of the Mk5 rather than an all-new design; it was developed with engineering improvements to shorten the previous model's assembly time to save costs. Additionally, it answered criticisms of that model's cheapened interior quality compared to that of the Mk4 and Mk3 Golf.

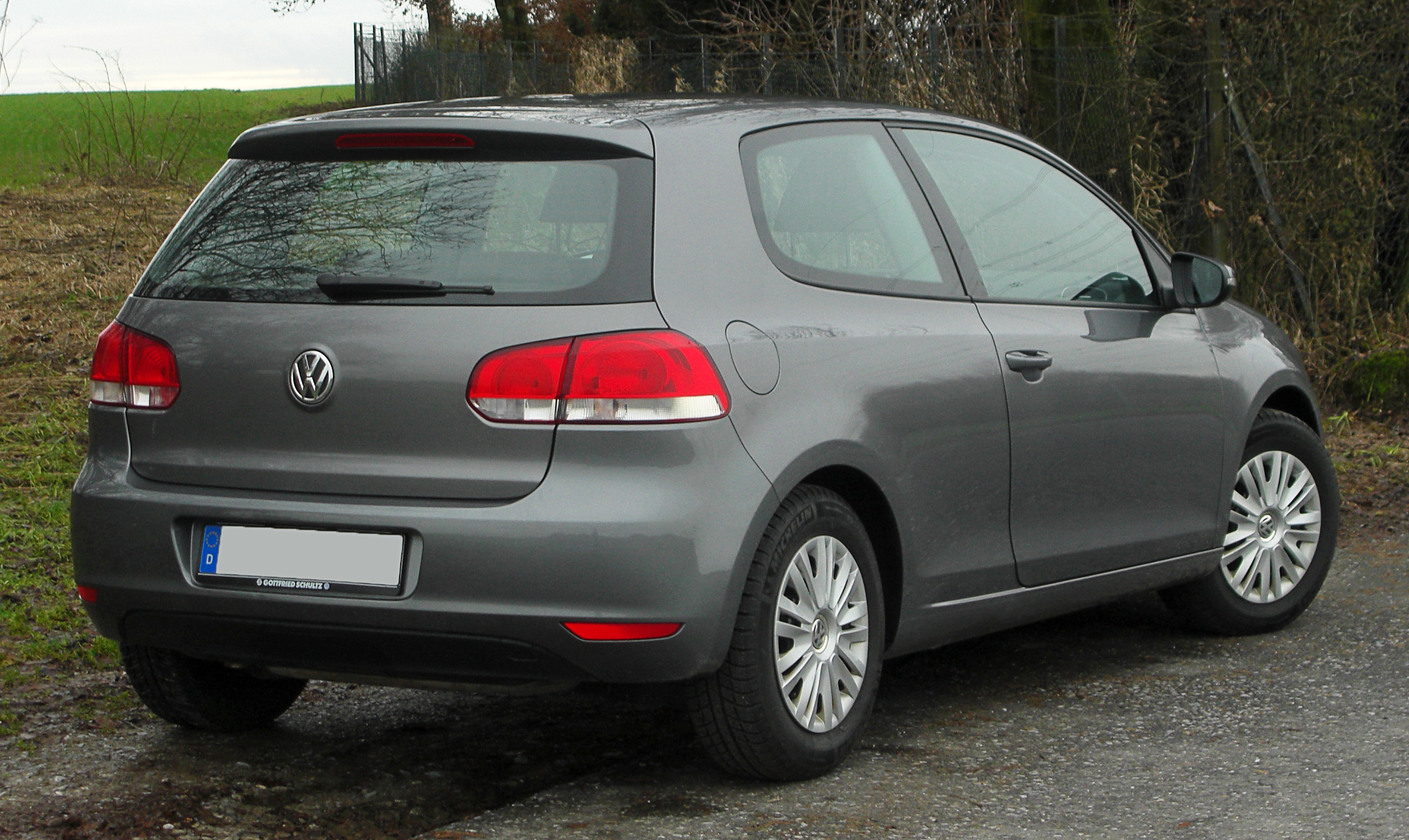
Rear view (3-door)

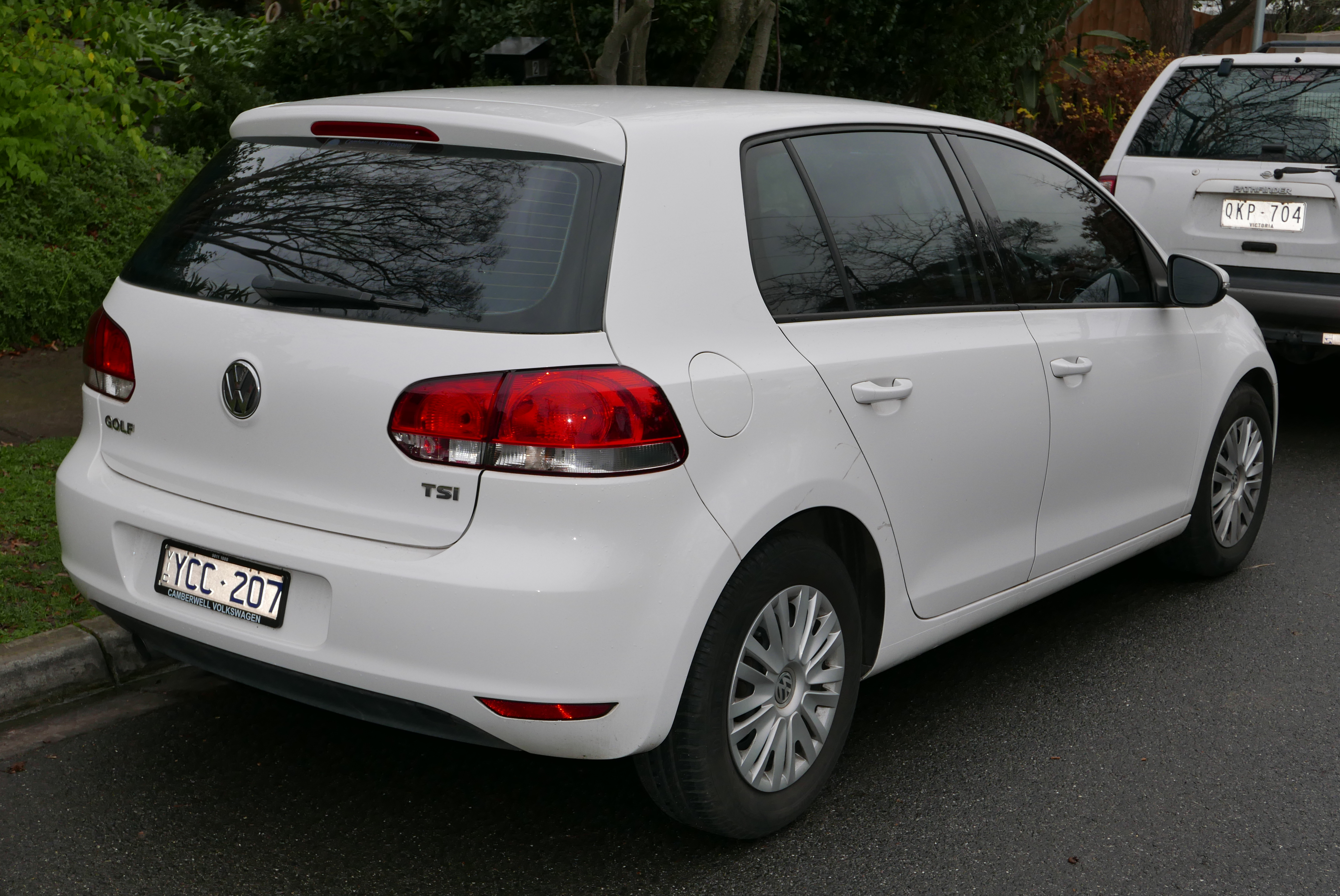
Rear view (5-door)

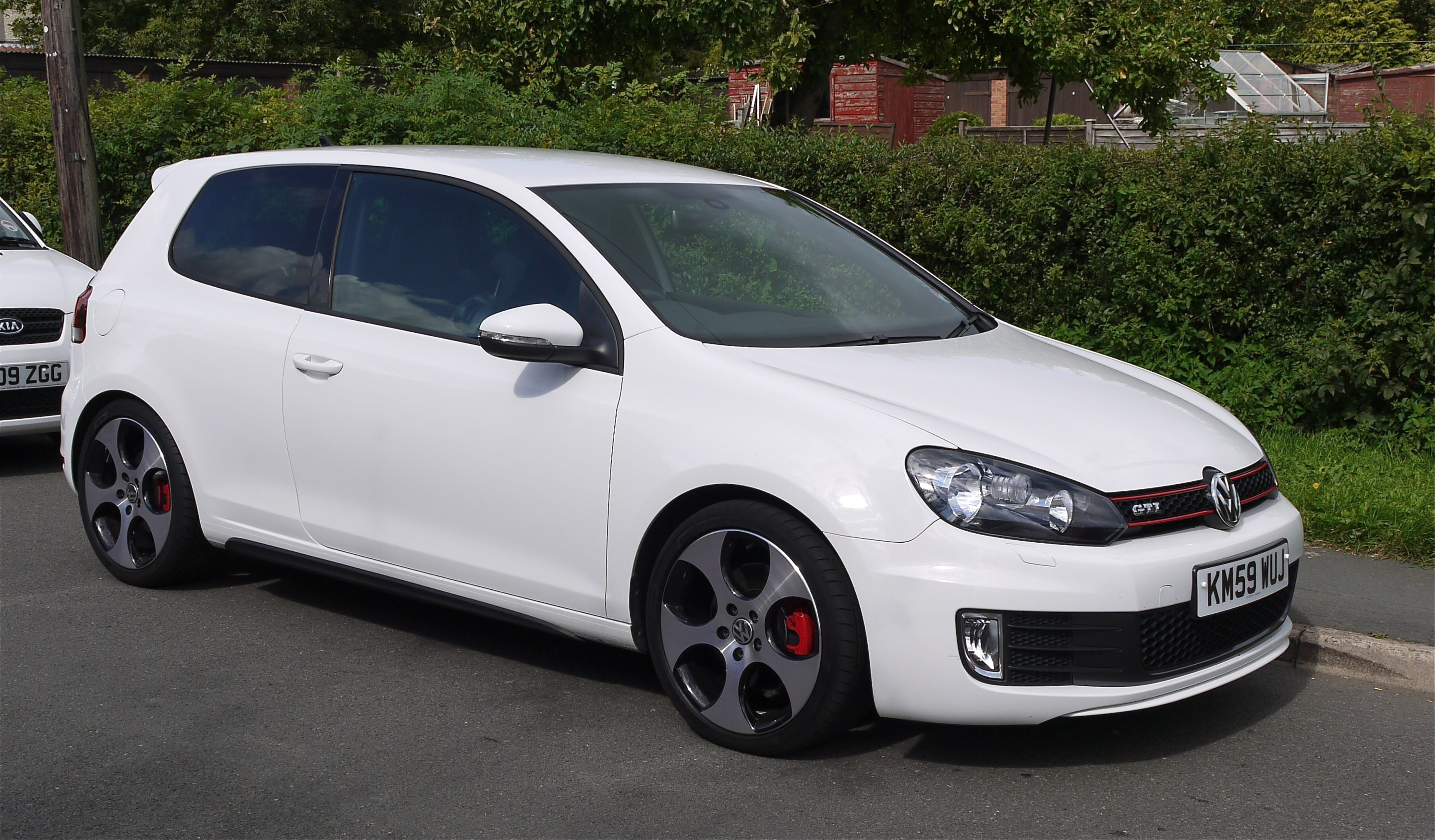
GTI (3-door)

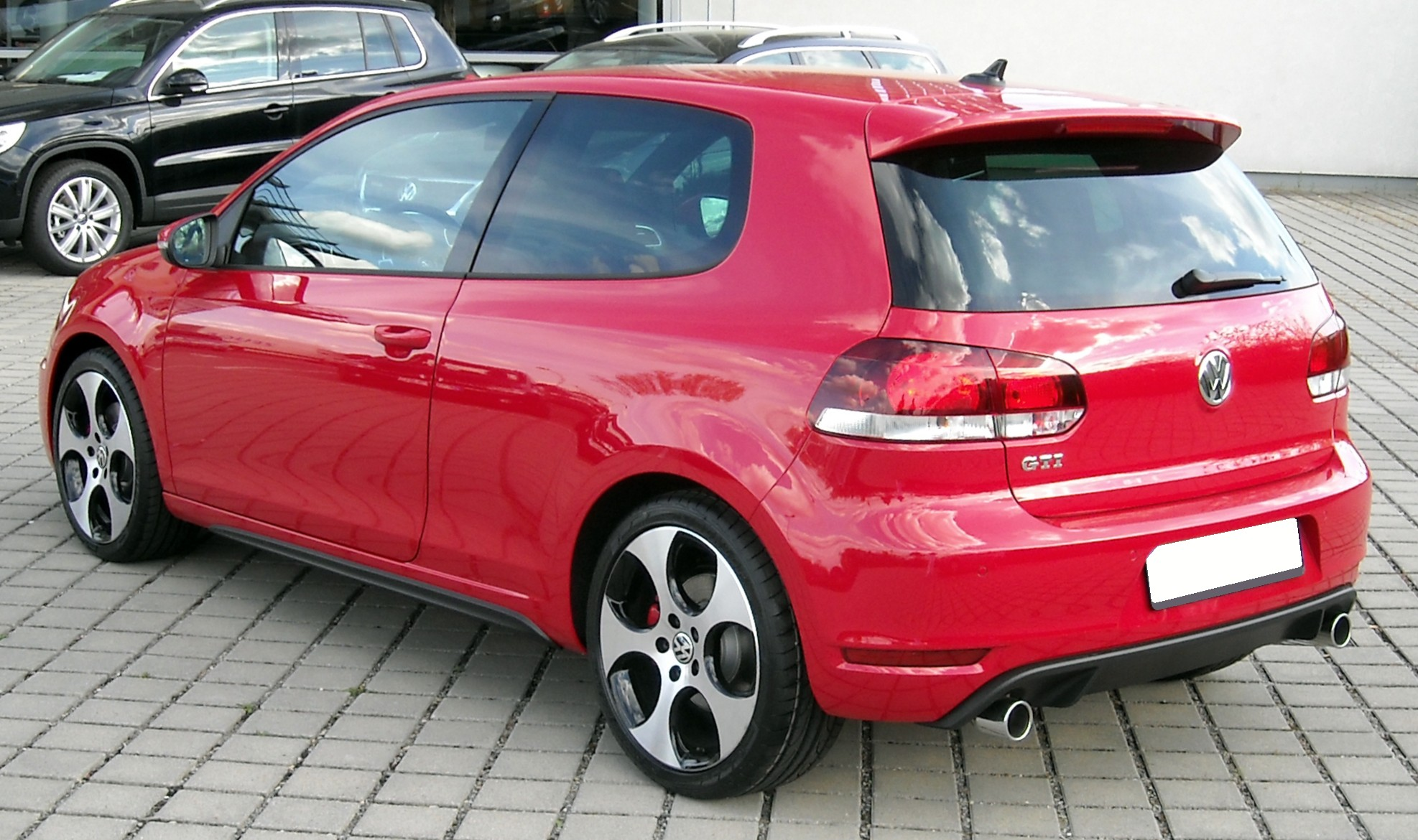
GTI (3-door; rear view)

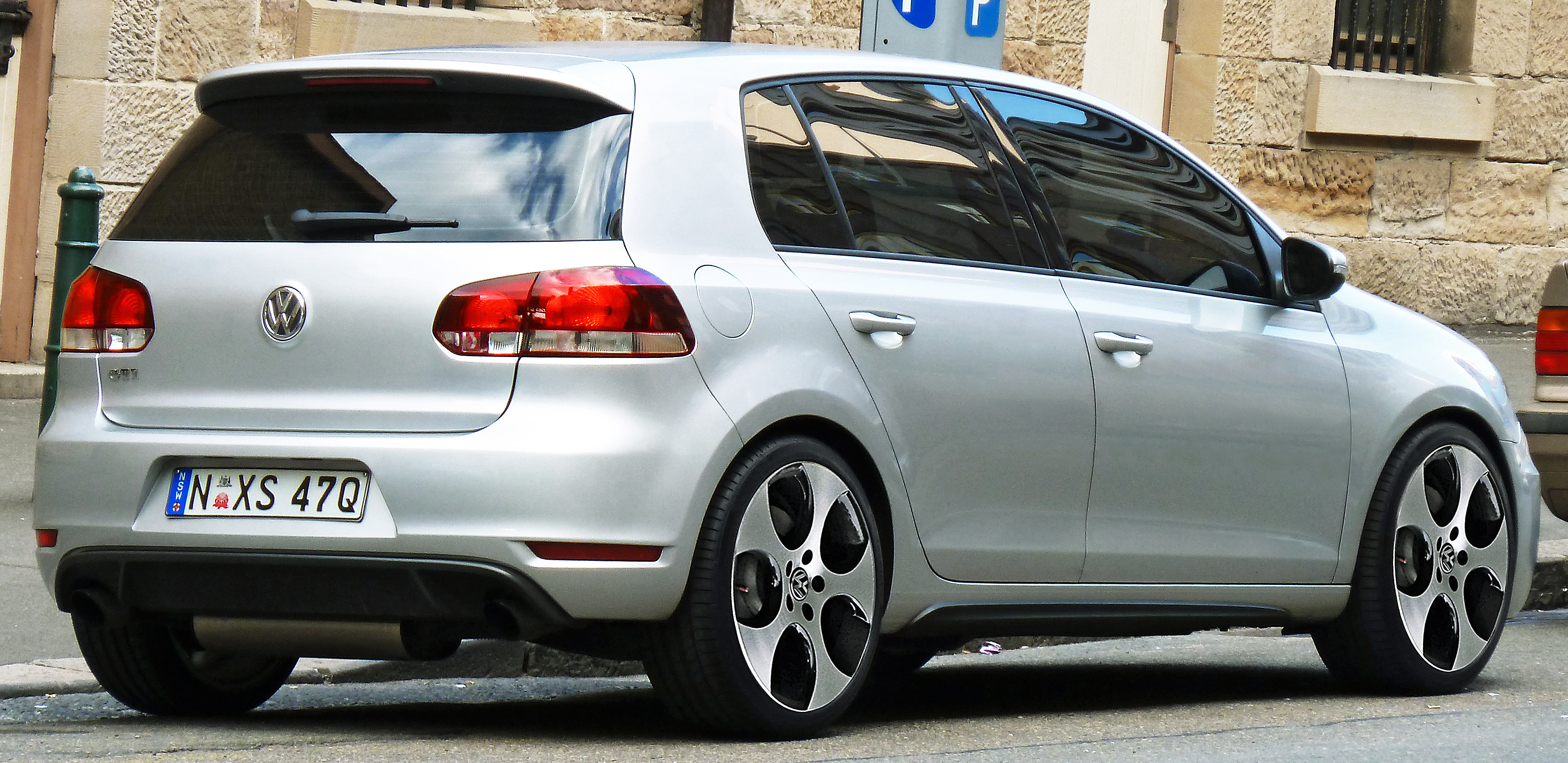
GTI (5-door)

GTD (5-Door)

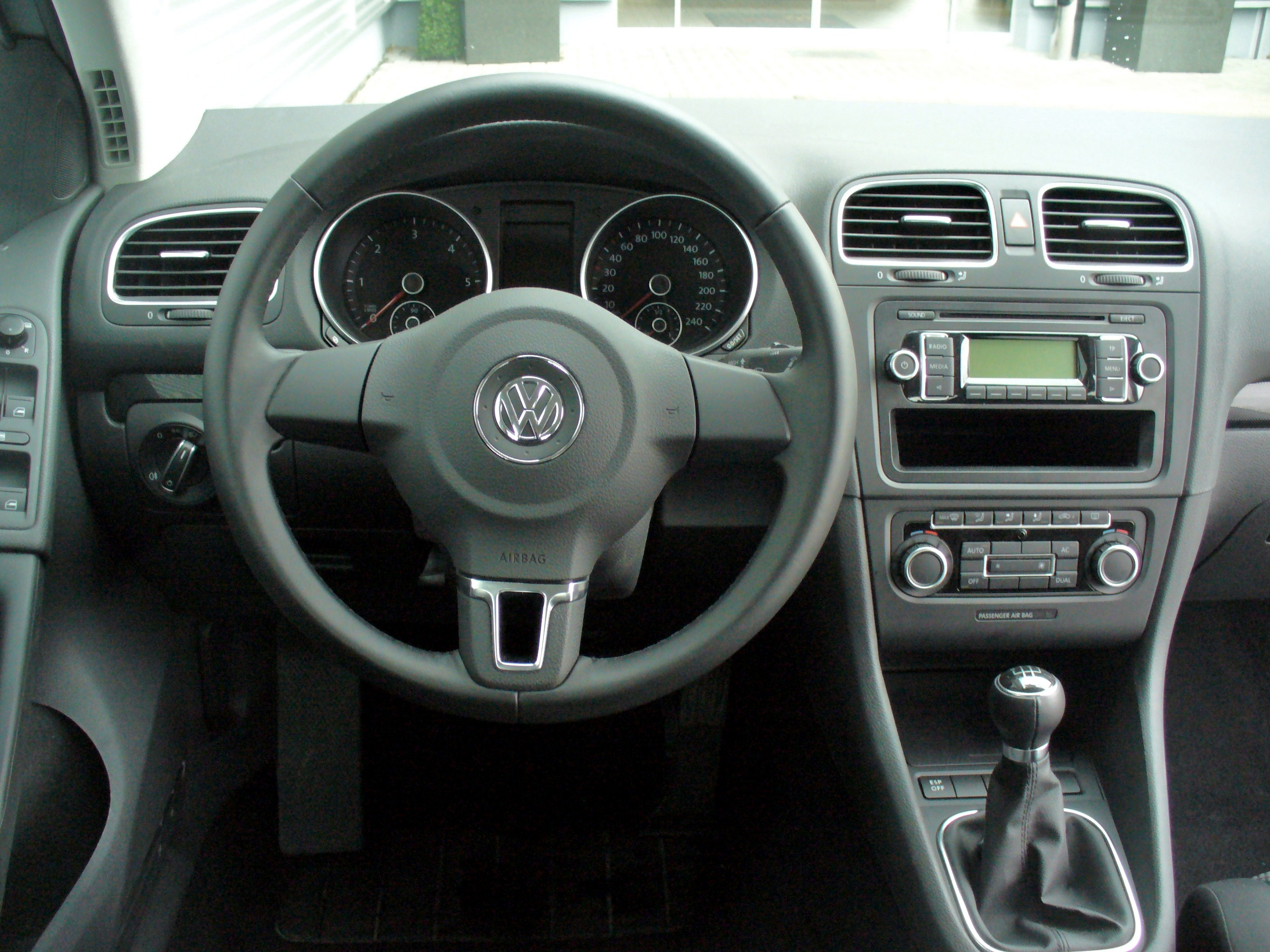
Interior

== Models ==
=== Cabriolet ===
The Volkswagen Golf Cabriolet was presented at the 2011 Geneva International Motor Show. The four-seater has a soft top with an electro-hydraulic drive that opens the Golf's top in 9.5 seconds. The top can also be opened or closed while driving, but only under 30 km/h (19 mph). This car was the first Cabriolet model under the Golf family since 2002.

The VW Golf Cabriolet's styling follows that of its hard-top three-door counterpart, but it differs somewhat with a rear section, lower profile roofline and more swept-back angle of its front windscreen frame. Bi-xenon headlights are an option. Unlike the regular Golf, the Cabriolet has LED rear lights, which are only available for the R and GTI versions of the hardtop. Safety features include the automatically deploying roll-over bar, front airbags, side head/thorax airbags, knee airbag for the driver and ESP.

There are six turbocharged direct-injection engines whose power outputs range from 77 kW (105 PS; 103 hp) to 155 kW (211 PS; 208 hp). Four of the petrol engines (TSI) and one diesel (TDI) are available with the DSG dual-clutch gearbox; while three of the engines are available with energy-saving BlueMotion Technology.

In February 2012, Volkswagen announced that they would build a Cabriolet version of the GTI, powered by a 2.0-litre four-cylinder engine.

As of October 2016, VW announced that the Golf cabriolet will no longer be sold in the UK due to financial reasons.

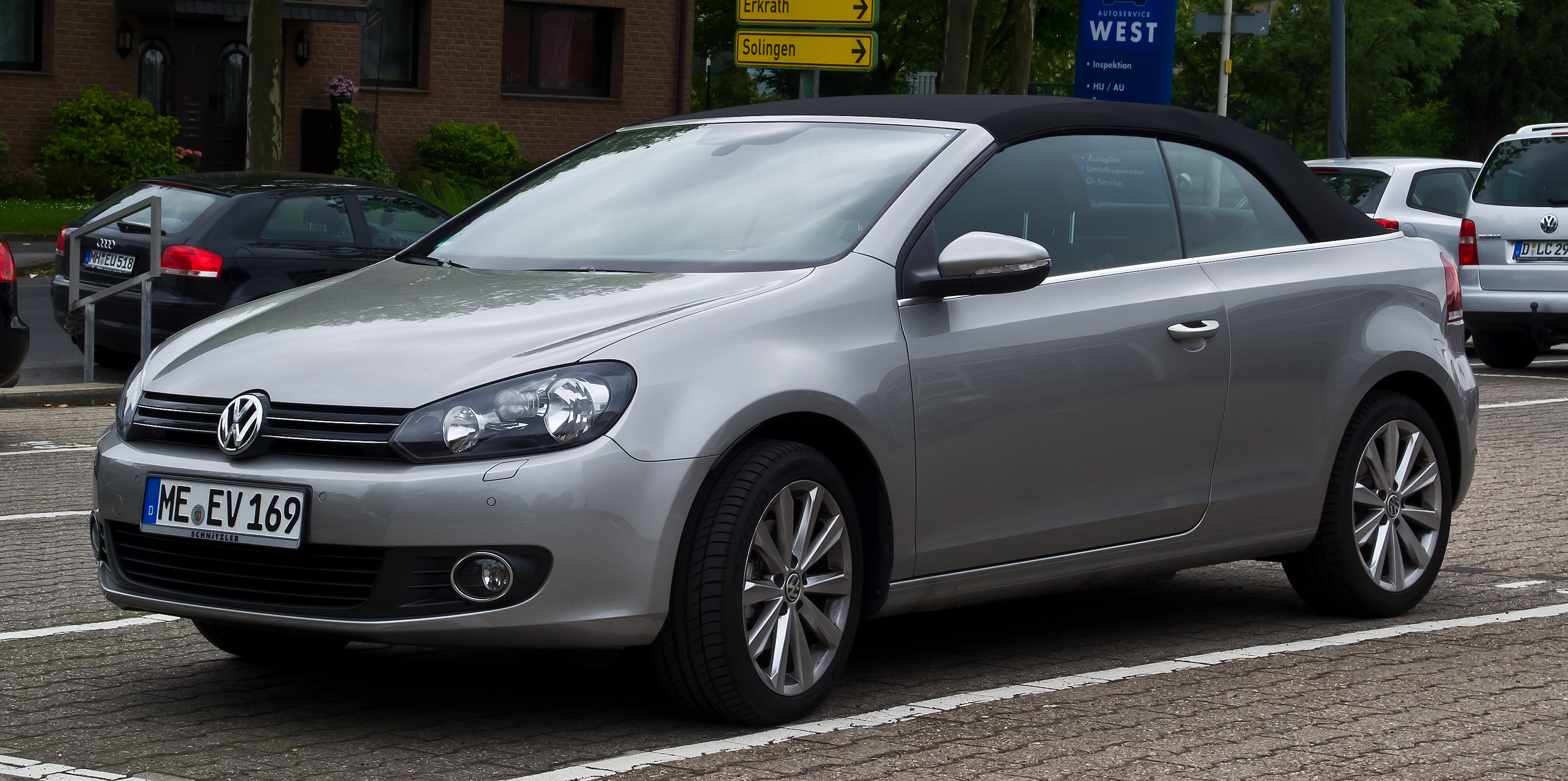
Golf Cabriolet

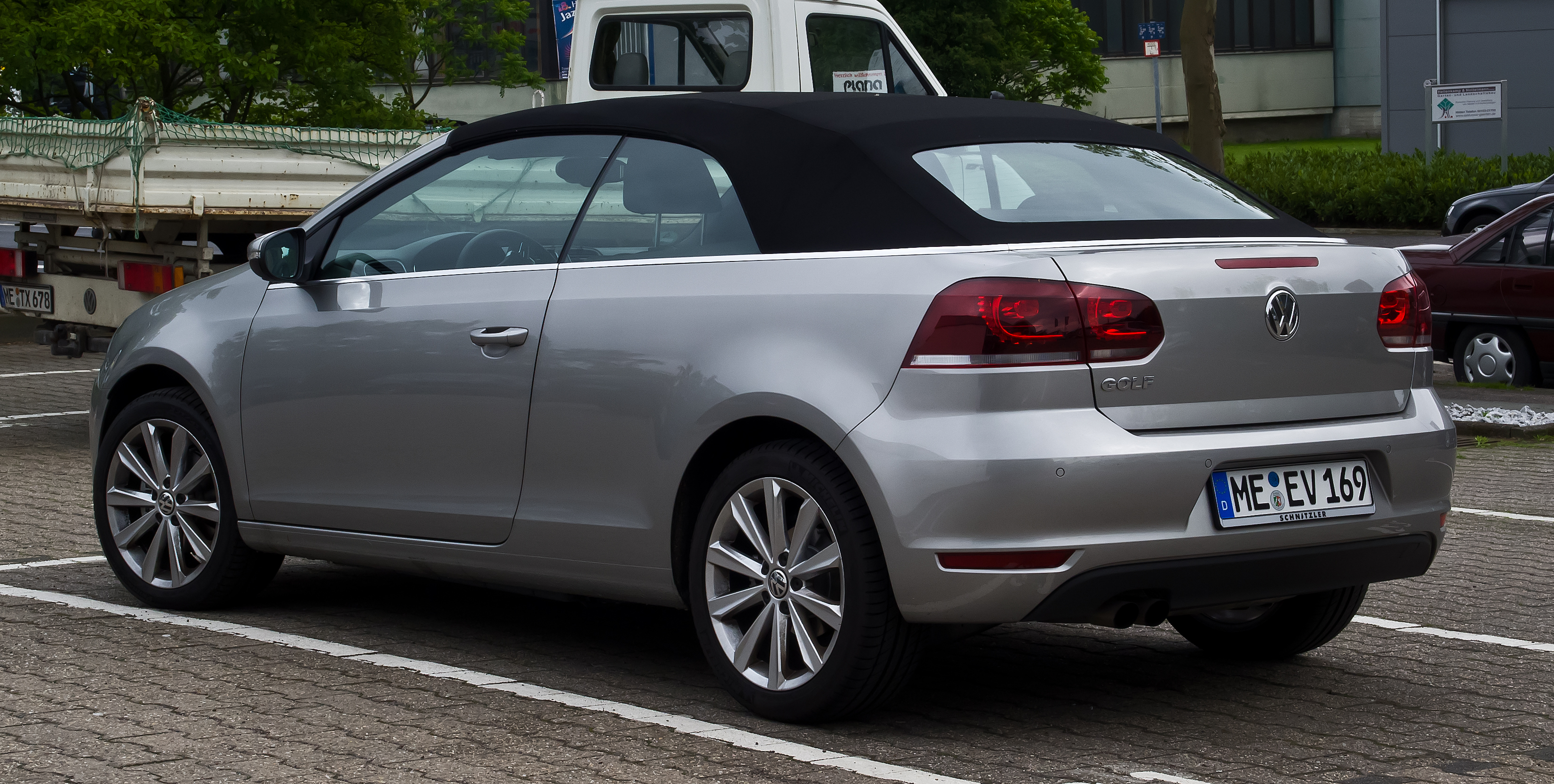
Golf Cabriolet

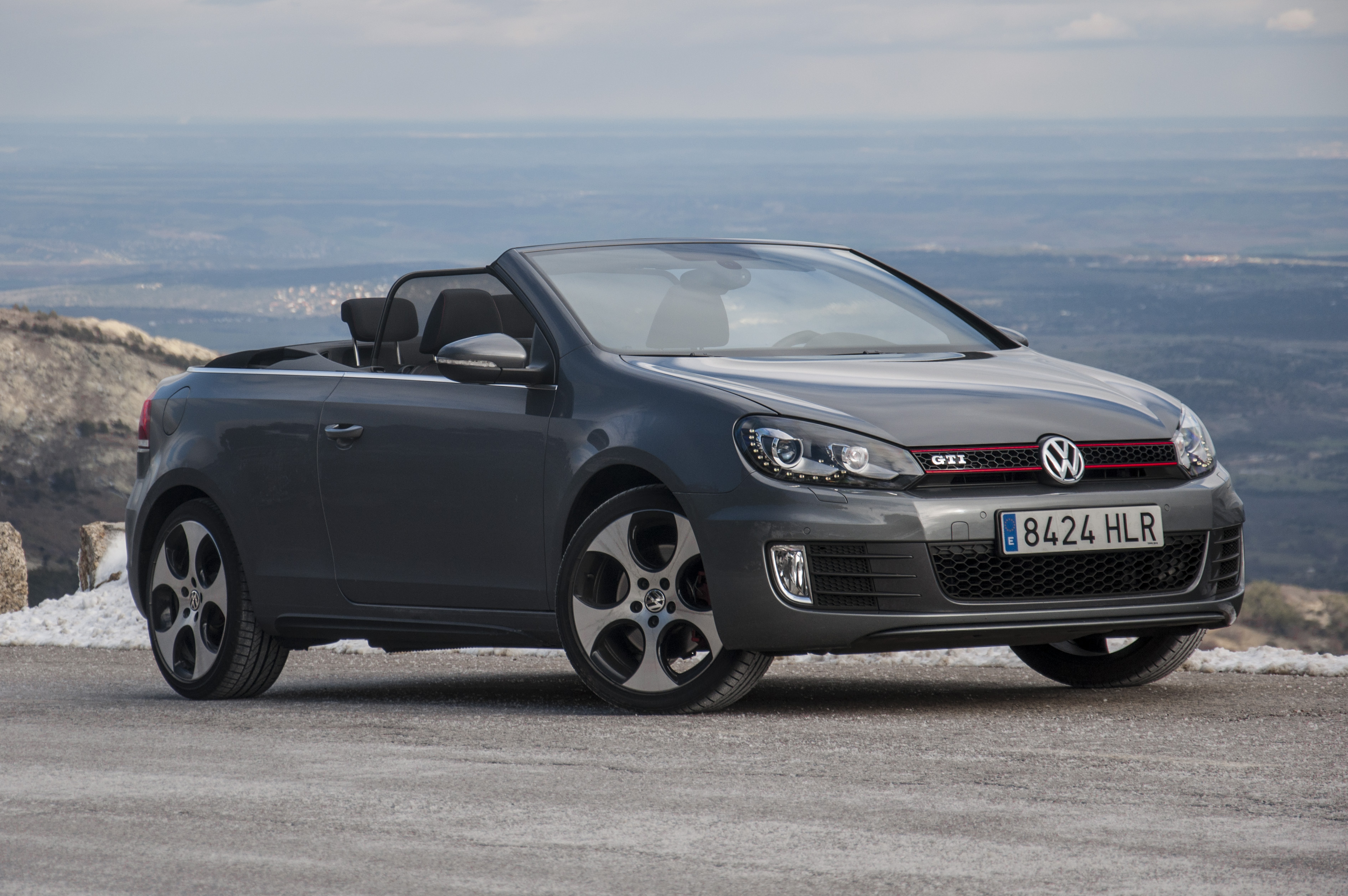
Golf Cabriolet GTI

=== Station wagon ===
A facelifted variant Mk5 Golf Variant model was introduced in 2009 as the Mk6, despite carrying the front fascia, interior styling, and the powertrain from the new Golf, the body shell and underpinnings are based on its fifth-generation predecessor. It is sold in the US as the Jetta SportWagen, in Mexico and Canada as the Golf Wagon and in South America as the Jetta Variant or Vento Variant.

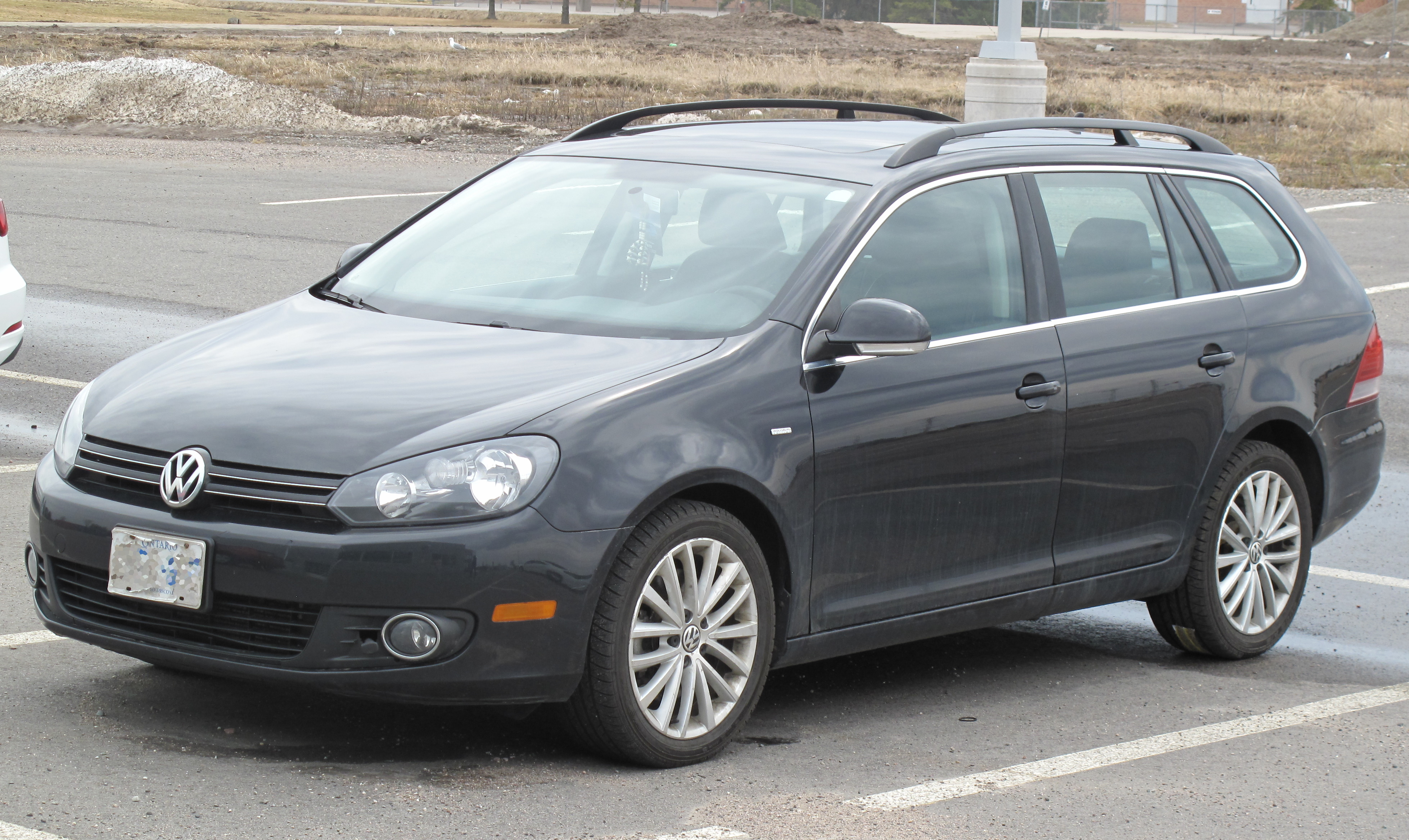
Golf Variant

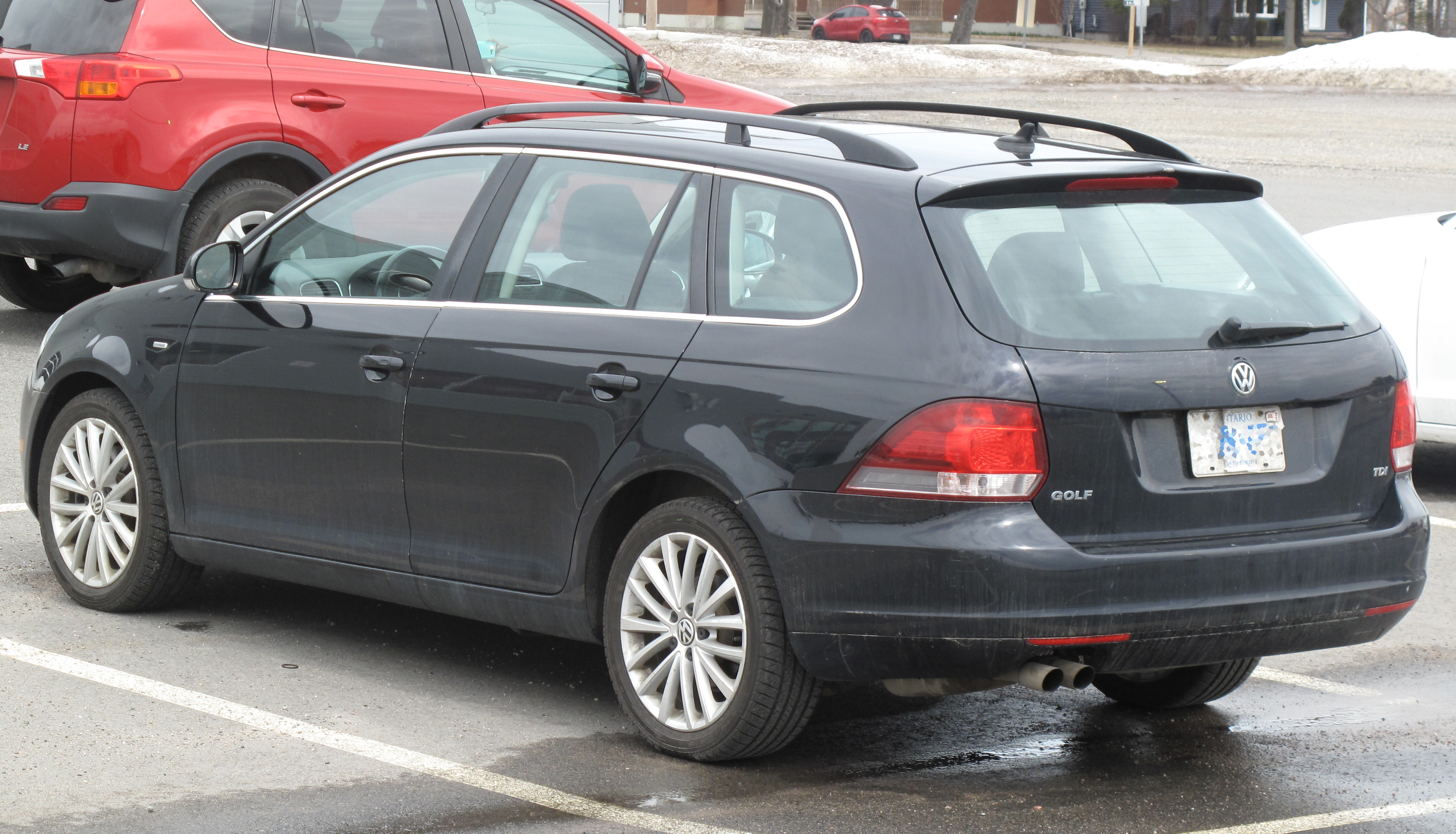
Golf Variant

=== Golf Plus ===
In December 2008, a facelifted version of the Golf Plus was revealed at the Bologna Motor Show, featuring a revised front end, similar to the Golf Mk6, but still largely retaining the design of the rear end and the interior of the Mk5 based vehicle. In 2014, the Golf Plus was replaced by the MQB-based Golf Sportsvan, which was originally shown as the Sportsvan concept.

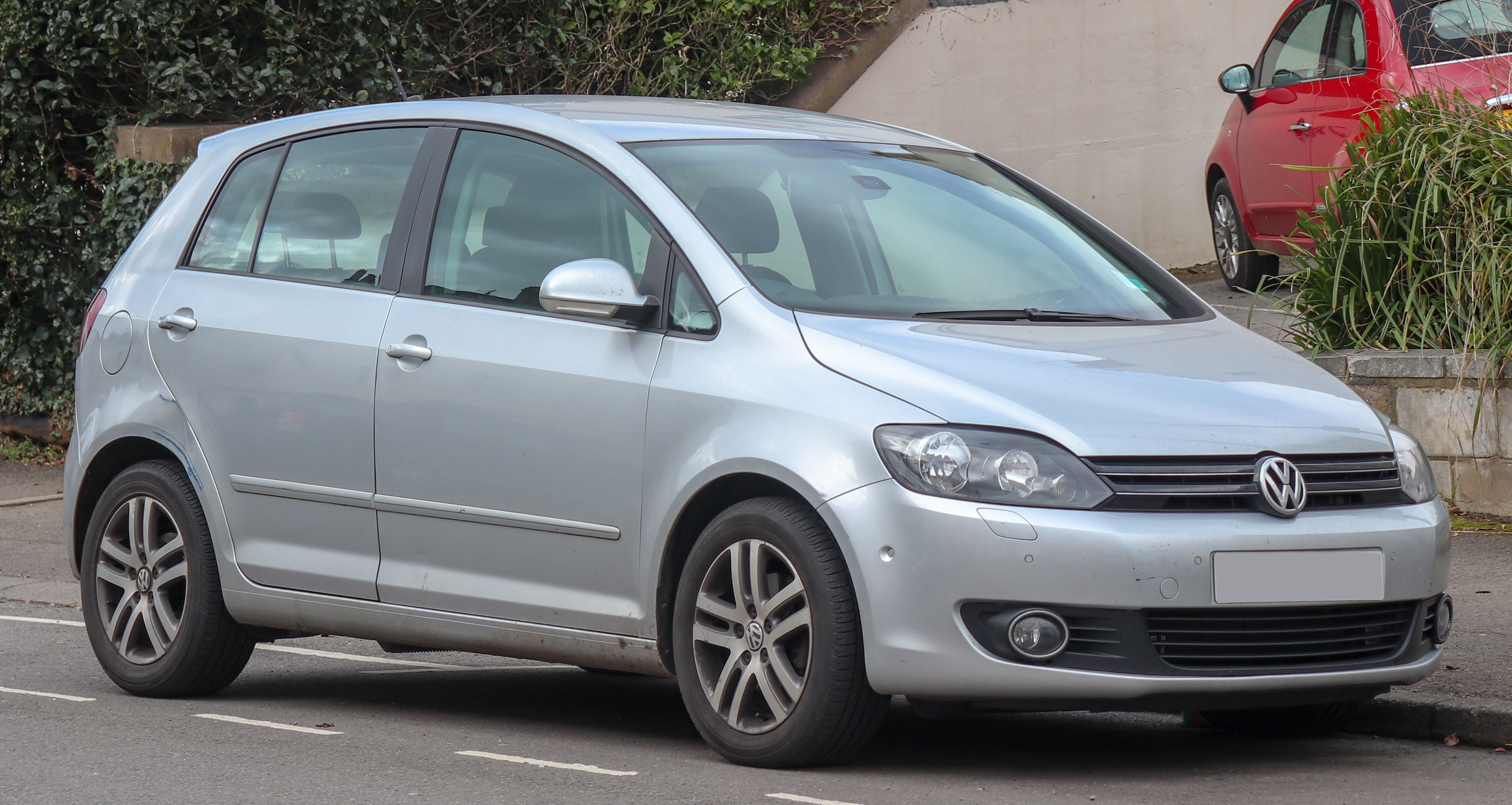
Golf Plus

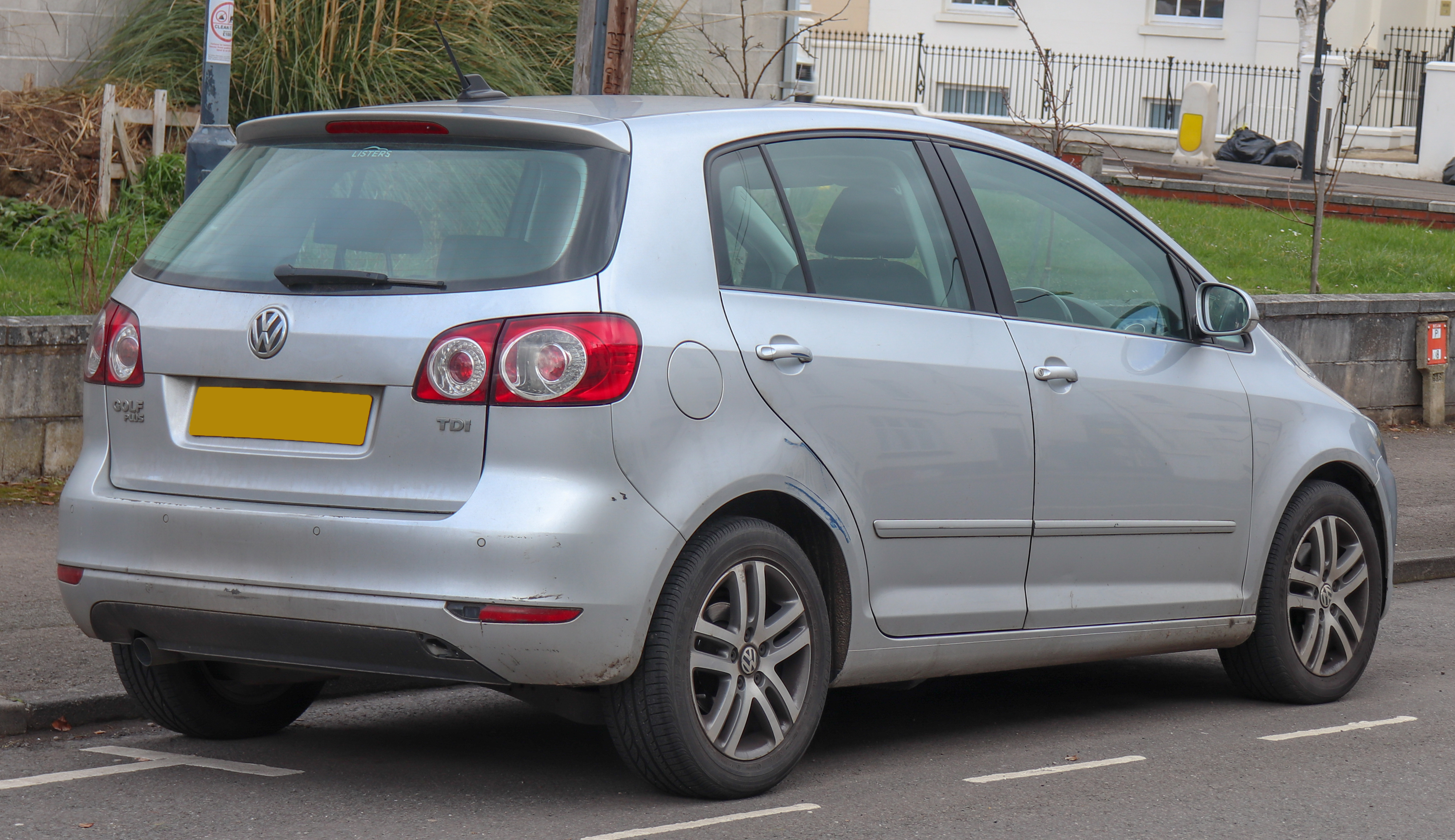
Golf Plus

== Specifications ==
=== Equipment ===
Improvements in equipment level on the German domestic market Golfs include—for the first time in a Golf—air conditioning as standard. Additionally, dual-zone climate control is included in the Golf R for North America.

=== Engines ===
Model	Engine type/code	Power/rpm	Torque/rpm	0–100 km/h (0-62 mph) acceleration	Top speed	Transmission
Petrol engine
1.4	1,390 cc (85 cu in) I4 (CGGA)	79 hp; 59 kW (80 PS) at 5,000	132 N⋅m (97 lb⋅ft) at 3,800	13.9 s	172 km/h (107 mph)	5-speed manual
1.6	1,595 cc (97 cu in) I4 (BSE/BSF/CCSA)	101 hp; 75 kW (102 PS) at 5,600	148 N⋅m (109 lb⋅ft) at 3,800	11.3 s	188 km/h (117 mph)	5-speed manual 7-speed DSG (optional)
1.2 TSI	1,197 cc (73 cu in) I4	84 hp; 63 kW (85 PS) at 4,800	160 N⋅m (118 lb⋅ft) at 1,500–3,500	12.3 s	178 km/h (111 mph)	5-speed manual
1.2 TSI	1,197 cc (73 cu in) I4 (CBZ/CBZB/CBZC)	104 hp; 77 kW (105 PS) at 5,000	175 N⋅m (129 lb⋅ft) at 1,550–4,100	10.6 s	190 km/h (118 mph)	6-speed manual 7-speed DSG (optional)
1.4 TSI	1,390 cc (85 cu in) I4 (CAXA)	120 hp; 90 kW (122 PS) at 5,000	200 N⋅m (148 lb⋅ft) at 1,500–4,000	9.5 s	200 km/h (124 mph)	6-speed manual 7-speed DSG (optional)
1.4 TSI	1,390 cc (85 cu in) I4 (CAVD)	158 hp; 118 kW (160 PS) at 5,800	240 N⋅m (177 lb⋅ft) at 1,500–4,000	8.0 s	220 km/h (137 mph)	6-speed manual 7-speed DSG (optional)
1.8 TSI	1,798 cc (110 cu in) I4 (CDAA)	158 hp; 118 kW (160 PS) at 4,500-6,000	250 N⋅m (184 lb⋅ft) at 1,500–4,500	8.0 s	220 km/h (137 mph)	6-speed manual 7-speed DSG (optional)
GTI	1,984 cc (121 cu in) I4 (CCZB/CBFA)	207 hp; 154 kW (210 PS) at 5,300-6,200	280 N⋅m (207 lb⋅ft) at 1,700-5,200	6.9 s	240 km/h (149 mph); 238 km/h (148 mph) (DSG)	6-speed manual 6-speed DSG (optional)
GTI "35"	1,984 cc (121 cu in) I4 (CDLG)	232 hp; 173 kW (235 PS) at 5,500-6,300	300 N⋅m (221 lb⋅ft) at 2,200-5,500	6.6 s	247 km/h (153 mph)	6-speed manual 6-speed DSG (optional)
2.5*	2,480 cc (151 cu in) I5 (BGQ/CBUA/CBTA)	170 hp; 127 kW (172 PS) at 5,700	240 N⋅m (177 lb⋅ft) at 4,250	7.6 s	209 km/h (130 mph) (elec. limited)	5-speed manual 6-speed Tiptronic Automatic (optional)
R	1,984 cc (121 cu in) I4 (CDLF/CDLC)	266 hp; 199 kW (270 PS) at 6,000	350 N⋅m (258 lb⋅ft) at 2,500-5,000	5.7 s 5.5 s (DSG)	274 km/h (170 mph)	6-speed manual 6-speed DSG (optional)
Liquefied petroleum gas engine
1.6 LPG	1,595 cc (97 cu in) I4 (CHGA)	97 hp; 72 kW (98 PS) at 5,600 (LPG); 101 hp; 75 kW (102 PS) at 5,600	144 N⋅m (106 lb⋅ft) at 3,800 (LPG); 148 N⋅m (109 lb⋅ft) at 3,800	12.1 s (LPG); 11.9	149 km/h (93 mph) (LPG); 169 km/h (105 mph)	5-speed manual
Diesel engine
1.6 TDI	1,598 cc (98 cu in) I4 (CAYB)	89 hp; 66 kW (90 PS) at 4,200	230 N⋅m (170 lb⋅ft) at 1,500-2,500	12.9 s	178 km/h (111 mph)	5-speed manual
1.6 TDI BlueMotion	1,598 cc (98 cu in) I4 (CAYC)	104 hp; 77 kW (105 PS) at 4,400	250 N⋅m (184 lb⋅ft) at 1,500-2,500	11.3 s 11.2 s (DSG)	190 km/h (118 mph)	5-speed manual 7-speed DSG (optional)
1.6 TDI	1,598 cc (98 cu in) I4 (CAY)	104 hp; 77 kW (105 PS) at 4,400	250 N⋅m (184 lb⋅ft) at 1,500-2,500	11.3 s 11.2 s (DSG)	189 km/h (117 mph)	5-speed manual 7-speed DSG (optional)
2.0 TDI	1,968 cc (120 cu in) I4 (CBDC)	108 hp; 81 kW (110 PS) at 4,200	250 N⋅m (184 lb⋅ft) at 1,500–2,500	10.7 s	190 km/h (118 mph)	5-speed manual 6-speed DSG (optional)
2.0 TDI BlueMotion	1,968 cc (120 cu in) I4 (CBAA/CBAB/CFFB)	138 hp; 103 kW (140 PS) at 4,200	320 N⋅m (236 lb⋅ft) at 1,750–2,500	9.3 s	209 km/h (130 mph)	6-speed manual 6-speed DSG (optional)
2.0 TDI 4Motion	1,968 cc (120 cu in) I4 (CBAA/CBAB)	138 hp; 103 kW (140 PS) at 4,200	320 N⋅m (236 lb⋅ft) at 1,750–2,500	9.1 s	206 km/h (128 mph)	6-speed manual
GTD	1,968 cc (120 cu in) I4 (CBBB/CFGB)	168 hp; 125 kW (170 PS) at 4,200	350 N⋅m (258 lb⋅ft) at 1,750–2,500	8.1 s	222 km/h (138 mph); 220 km/h (137 mph) (DSG)	6-speed manual 6-speed DSG (optional)

In 2009, the company spoke confidently of launching a BlueMotion low emissions Golf in Germany. They have also mentioned utilizing alternative fuels in later products.

- Available engines for North American Golf include the 2.5 L I5 engine from the previous Mk5 Rabbit and Mk5 Jetta and the 2.0-litre TDI. GTI version features the 2.0-litre TSI.

== Golf R ==
The Golf R was unveiled by Volkswagen at the Frankfurt IAA on 15 September 2009 as a Golf R32 replacement.

The Golf R is powered by a 1,984 cc (2.0 L; 121.1 cu in) FSI turbocharged Inline-four engine that produces 270 PS (266 bhp; 199 kW) at 6000 rpm and 350 N⋅m (258 lb⋅ft) at 2500-5000 rpm of torque. VW claims the car can get from 0–100 km/h (62 mph) in 5.5 seconds for DSG equipped models, or 5.7 seconds for cars fitted with a manual transmission. It employs a revised (4th-generation) Haldex 4motion all-wheel drive system.

In Australia, Japan, China, America and South Africa, the Golf R engine is detuned to suit hotter climate conditions, from 198.5 kW (270 PS; 266 bhp) to 188 kW (256 PS; 252 bhp) and from 350 N⋅m (258 lbf⋅ft) to 330 N⋅m (243 lbf⋅ft).

On 9 December 2010, Volkswagen announced that the Golf R will be available in the United States beginning in 2012, in both two- and four-door versions were offered, but without the DSG transmission, and with a slightly detuned engine producing 191 kW (256 hp) and 243 lb⋅ft (329 N⋅m). A Canadian version was announced for early 2012, but only as a four-door version with six-speed manual transmission.

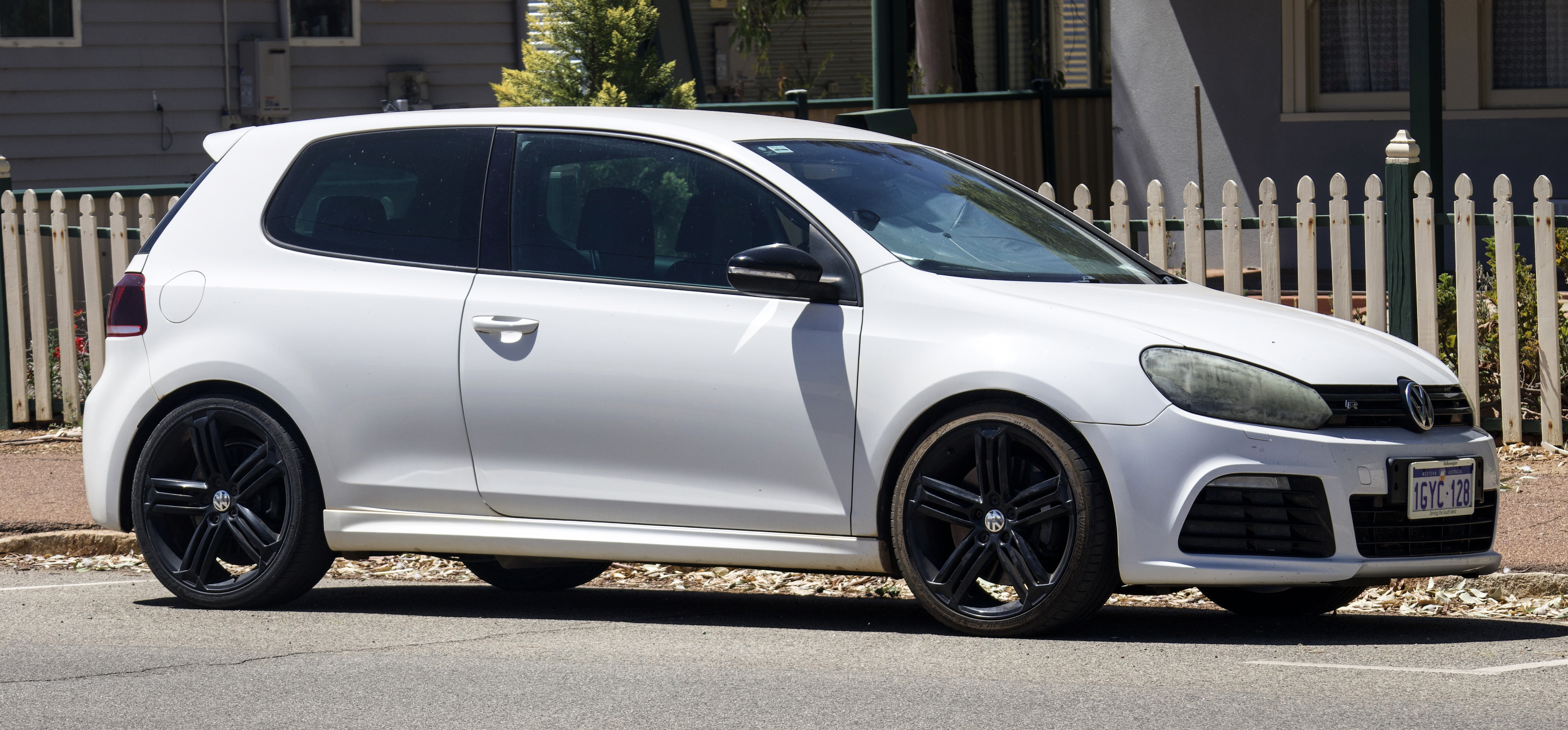
3-door version (front)

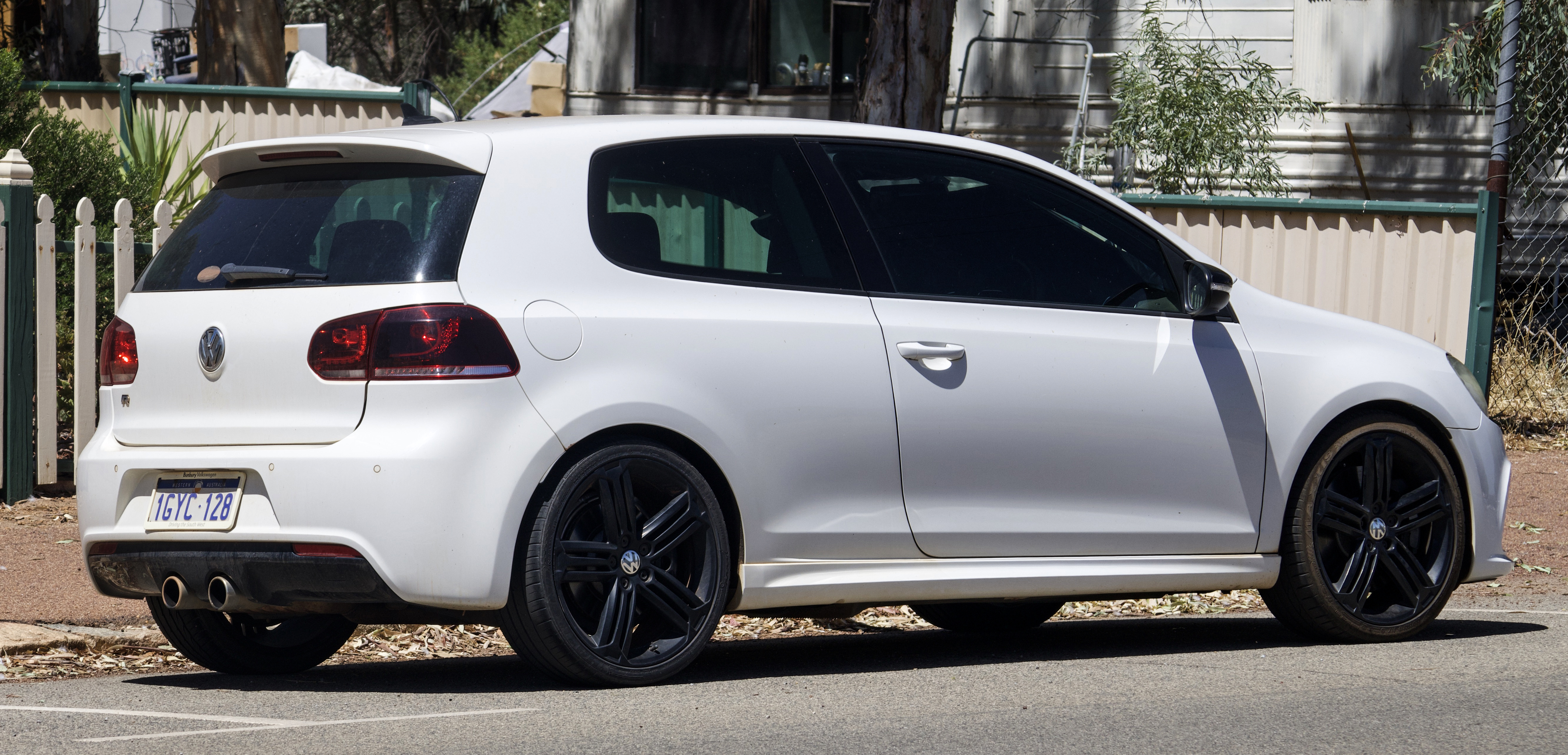
3-door version (rear)

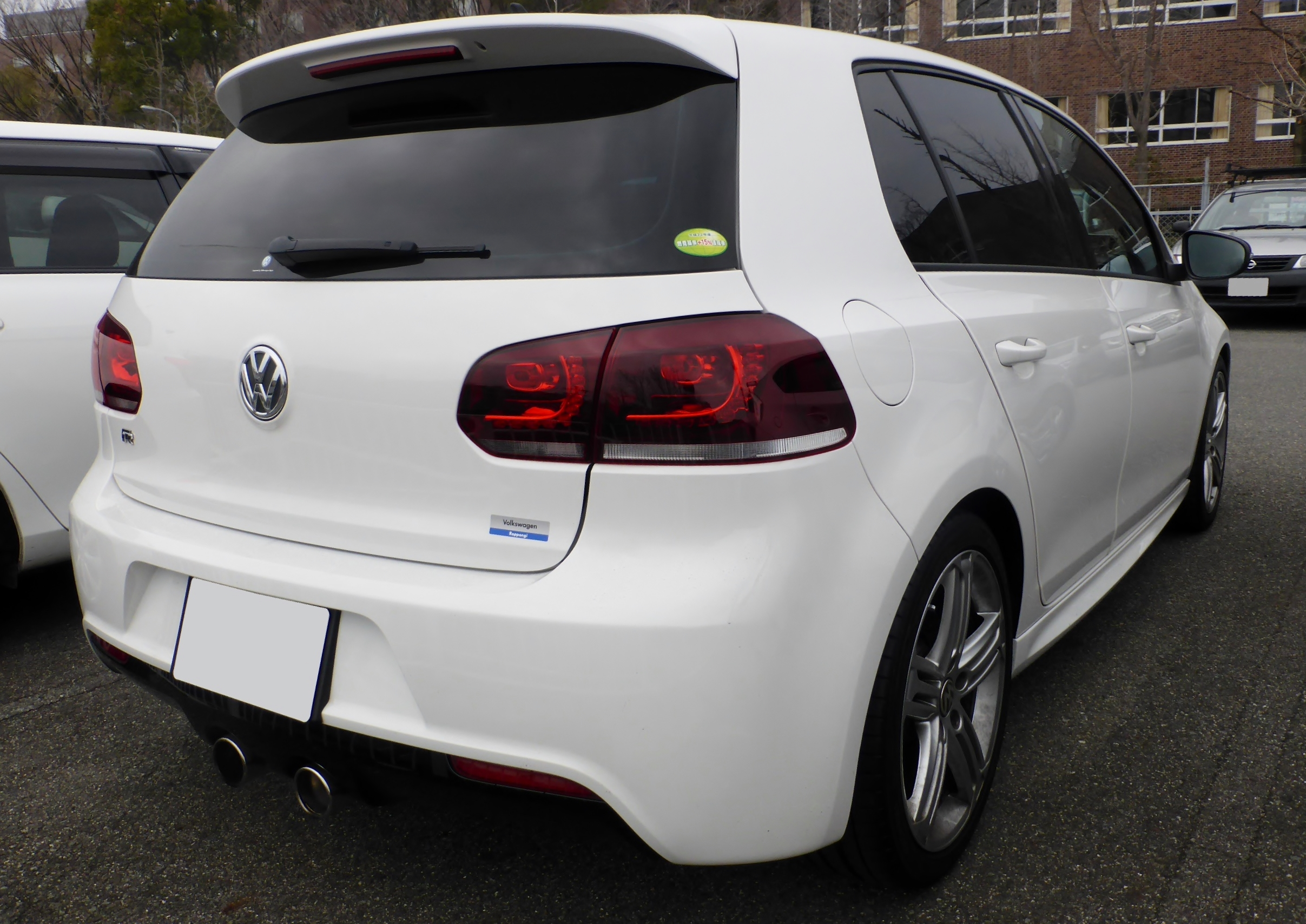
5-door version

== Special editions ==
=== GTI Edition 35 ===
Following Volkswagen's 30th anniversary edition GTI, the 35th anniversary was celebrated with the GTI Edition 35. Its engine was an updated version of the Mk5 GTI engine (also used in the Mk6 Golf R), with 232 bhp (compared to 266 for the R). Acceleration from 0-62 mph is in 6.6 seconds.

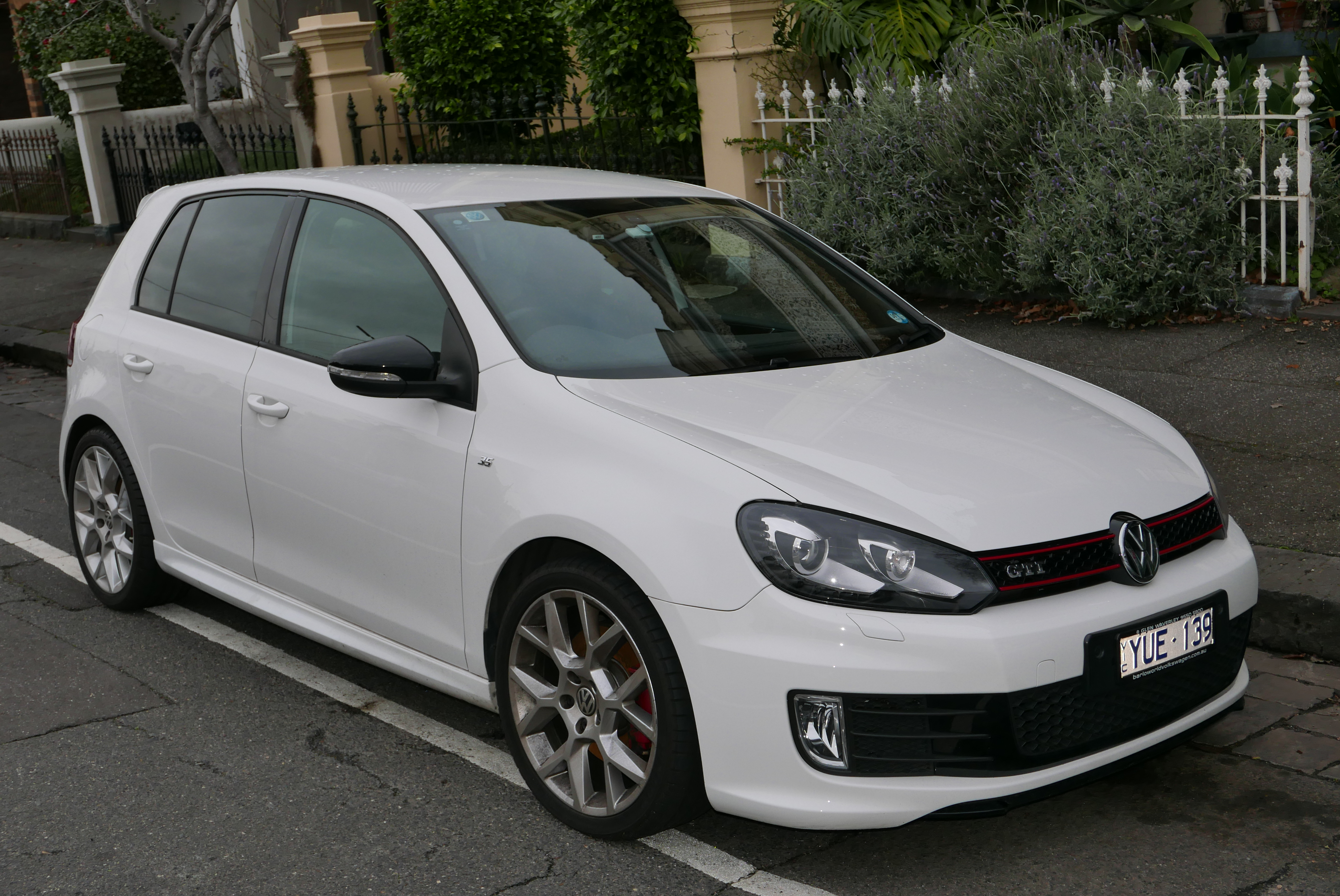
Golf VI GTI Edition 35

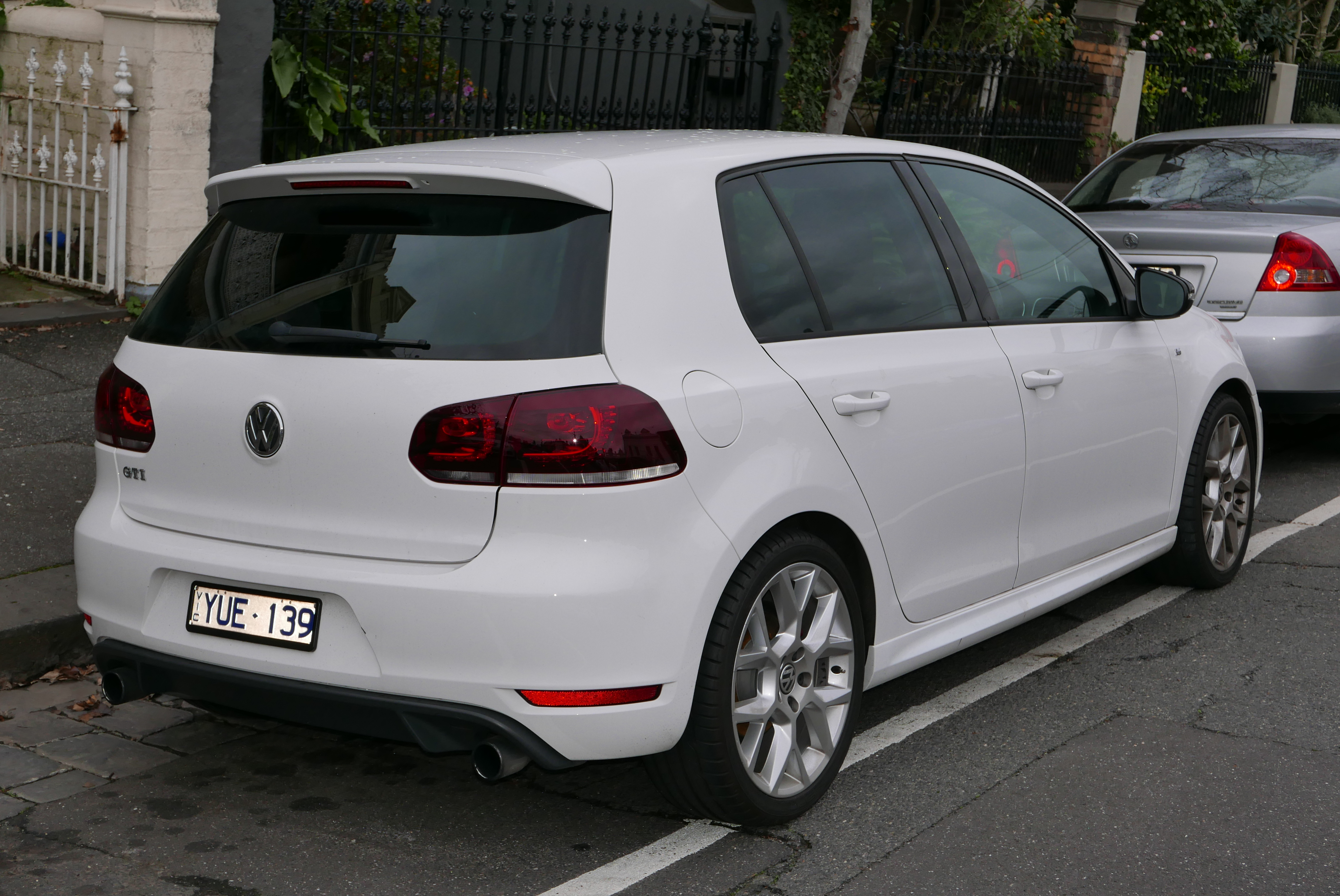
Golf VI GTI Edition 35

== Markets ==
=== North America ===
In the United States and Canada, the car was sold as the Volkswagen Golf when it arrived in showrooms in October 2009, dropping the "Rabbit" badge that was used for the Golf Mk5. The wagon, a restyled version of the Mk5 and the only Golf model made in Mexico, is sold in Canada as "Golf Wagon", but in the United States retains the "Jetta SportWagen" designation (while wearing Golf front sheetmetal). North American Golfs will carry over the same engines as the Mk5 (the same 2.5L five-cylinder from the Mk5, the 2.0TDI and the 2.0T) and, while the GTI and TDI continue to offer the six-speed manual transmission, the 2.5 L will re-use the five-speed manual (automatic will be a six-speed tiptronic). The new Golf is also available in Mexico but for the time being only in the wagon configuration that is marketed as Golf SportWagen that became available in early October replacing the Bora Sportwagen with the new Golf's front end.

=== Australia ===
The Australian public got their first taste of the new Mk6 at the Melbourne International Motor Show, which began on 27 February 2009. The new Golf was launched around the country at the same time. The Mk6 GTI went on sale from 30 October 2009. On 19 January 2010 the Golf was awarded the 2009 Wheels Car of the Year title, which is acknowledged as the country's most prestigious car award. It was the first time the Golf had been awarded the title since 1976. VW Australia launched the new base model golf with 1.2-litre engine same as the new Polo in September 2010 and went on sale in 2011.

=== South Africa ===
In South Africa the new Mk6 Golf went on sale in April 2009. The South African version of the GTI went on sale in July 2009.

=== Japan ===
In Japan the new Mk6 Golf went on sale in April 2009. The Japanese version of the GTI went on sale in August 2009.

=== China ===
In China, the Golf Mk6 was made by FAW-VW commencing production for the 2010 model year, succeeding the Mk4 Golf and China-exclusive Bora HS as the Mk5 variant was not produced in China. The sixth generation GTI began to be built locally for first time in March 2010 and used a different engine compared to Golf GTI model sold internationally, where a 2-litre TSI unit producing 149 kW (200 hp) was available as standard, 7.5 kW (10 hp) less than the original one. This engine is also used by the VW Magotan. Other engines include a 1.4 TSI and a 1.6 naturally aspirated engine producing 112 kW (150 hp) and 82 kW (110 hp), respectively. The 5 speed manual and 7 speed dual clutch gearbox was standard on TSI models while the 1.6 litre units were paired to a 5 speed manual and 6 speed automatic gearbox. Production for this generation ended in 2013, where it was replaced the Golf Mk7.

=== Mexico ===
In Mexico, the only two versions available until August 2011 were the German-imported 3-door GTI in both 6-speed manual and 6-speed DSG transmissions, and the Mexican-produced Golf SportWagen with a 170 bhp 2.5 L inline 5-cylinder with a 6-speed Tiptronic transmission. In September 2012, a 5-door version in Comfortline trim, with 1.4 L TSI engine with 177 hp and 6-speed manual gearbox imported from Germany was added. Since the end of production is imminent, it will be limited to 4,000 units.

=== Chile ===
In Chile, the Golf Mk6 was presented in October 2010 at the XI Salón del Automóvil de Santiago, starting sales immediately. Chile is the first country in South America to sell the Mk6, as a restyled version of the Mk4 is still in production in Brazil for Latin America. The Mk6 is available in Chile with the 1.6 L Petrol engine (101 hp) both in five-speed manual and seven-speed DSG transmissions.

=== India ===
In India, the Golf Mk6 was rumored to be introduced in 2011 but in a recent interview, Volkswagen Chief Executive Officer said that the plans for introducing a Golf have been suspended, to preserve the success of VW Vento in the Indian market. The Golf, if released, would be similarly priced as the Vento and VW does not want Vento sales to slip. He also stated they may bring in a more localized Golf with the same engine choices as the Vento when numbers stabilize in the near future.

== Safety ==
With safety features such as seven standard airbags (up to nine in Europe, up to eight in the US) and standard Electronic Stability Programme (ESP), the Golf Mk6 has scored 36 out of 37 possible points for occupant protection, giving it a five-star rating by the Euro NCAP crash test agency. It was one of the safest vehicles in its class at the time of its release.

ANCAP test results* Volkswagen Golf 5 door hatch (2009)
Test	Score
Overall	5 /5 stars
Frontal offset	15.73/16
Side impact	15.99/16
Pole	2/2
Seat belt reminders	2/3
Whiplash protection	Not Assessed
Pedestrian protection	Adequate
Electronic stability control	Standard

ANCAP test results* Volkswagen Golf Cabriolet 1.4L petrol engine (2011)
Test	Score
Overall	5 /5 stars
Frontal offset	15.16/16
Side impact	16/16
Pole	2/2
Seat belt reminders	2/3
Whiplash protection	Not Assessed
Pedestrian protection	Adequate
Electronic stability control	Standard

== Concept models ==
=== Twin Drive (2008) ===
Volkswagen CEO Martin Winterkorn announced Golf Twin Drive plug-in hybrid concept based on Mk5 Golf, which uses 2.0 L 91 kW (122 hp) I4 turbodiesel and 61 kW (82 hp) electric motor with lithium-ion batteries. The car can run about 50 kilometres on battery power. The combined power is 128 kW (174 PS).

Volkswagen developed the Twin Drive system with eight German partners, and is planning a trial fleet of 20 Golfs outfitted with the system in 2010.

The production version was expected to be based on new Mk6 Golf, featuring a 1.5 L turbodiesel engine and electric motor, with estimated arrival date of 2015.

=== Golf GTI "Wörthersee 09" (2009) ===
The Golf GTI "Wörthersee 09" is a concept car based on the Golf GTI. 2.0-litre TSI. Its engine is rated at 155 kW; 208 bhp (211 PS), with a 0–100 km/h (0-62 mph) acceleration time of 6.9 seconds and a top speed of 238 km/h (148 mph). It features a Firespark Metallic red body colour with GTI stripes, high-gloss black 19-inch alloy spoke wheels, smoked LED taillights, a lowered chassis and a new sport exhaust. Changes to the interior include aluminum tread plates, brushed aluminum trim and glossy black painted frames around the air vents, red bordered floor mats and black Nappa leather sport seats with red accents and "Berry White" leather piping.

The vehicle was unveiled at the Wörthersee GTi-Treffen meet in Wörthersee, Austria.

== Motorsport ==
In auto racing, APR Motorsport has led two MKVI VW GTIs to victory in the Grand-Am Continental Tire Sports Car Challenge Street Tuner (ST) class.

To commemorate the 35th Anniversary of the Golf GTI, Volkswagen Motorsport entered the 2011 24 Hours Nürburgring with the "Golf24". This Golf was equipped with a 2,500 cc five-cylinder turbo engine with 324 kW (441 PS; 434 hp) and 540 N⋅m (398 lbf⋅ft), permanent 4WD and a sequential six-speed gearbox. In the third VLN race of 2011, the Golf24 finished sixth overall, with its best lap only nine seconds slower than the fastest race lap, which was clocked by a Ferrari 458. For the 24 Hours, the team hoped for rain, and jokingly considered wetting the track by aerial firefighting. Eventually, though, neither of the three Golf24s finished the race, with one of them suffering a pit-entry accident and another blowing a gearbox. When the gearbox of the remaining Golf24 started overheating, VW decided to retire it to find out the cause of the gearbox trouble.

== Awards ==
- 2009 World Car of the Year
- 2009 Euro NCAP – Safest Car of the Year
- 2009 Best Performance Car under $60,000 (GTI) (Australia)
- 2009 Yellow Angel (Germany)
- 2009 Auto Motor and Sport Readers' Best Car (Germany)
- 2009 Wheels Car of the Year (Australia)
- 2009 What Car? – Best Small Family Car (Great Britain)
- 2009 International Engine of the Year (1.4 TSI)
- 2009 Green Engine of the Year (1.4 TSI)
- 2009–10 Japan's Import Car of the Year
- 2010 Continental Irish Car of the Year – Best Family Car.
- 2010 Automobile Magazine – Car of the Year (GTI)
- 2010 Canadian Car of the Year
- 2010 What Car? – Best Small Family Car (Great Britain)
- 2010 South African Car of the Year
- 2010 Fleet News – Company Car of the Year
- 2010 World Green Car (BlueMotion)
- Kelley Blue Book included the VW Golf TDI (clean diesel) among its Top 10 Green Cars for 2010.
- 2010 Top Gear Magazine – Hot Hatch of the year (Golf R)
- 2011 What Car? – Best Small Family Car (Great Britain)
- 2012 What Car? – Best Small Family Car (Great Britain)

Preceded by Volkswagen Golf Mk5	Volkswagen Golf Mk6; 2008–2016	Succeeded by Volkswagen Golf Mk7
