= Volkswagen Golf R32 =

Volkswagen Golf R32 may refer to two different Volkswagen Golf models:

- Volkswagen Golf Mk4 R32, a 2003 model
- Volkswagen Golf Mk5 R32, a 2005 model
